= Holy Qurbana (disambiguation) =

The Holy Qurbana is the Eucharist as celebrated in the Edessan Rite (East Syriac Rite).

Holy Qurbana may also refer to:

- Holy Qurobo, the Eucharist as celebrated in the Indian Churches that employ the Syro-Antiochene Rite (West Syriac Rite)
- Liturgy of Addai and Mari or Holy Qurbana of Mar Addai and Mar Mari, the eucharistic liturgy in the Edessan Rite

== See also ==
- Eucharist, a Christian rite that is considered a sacrament
- Divine Liturgy, the Eucharistic service of the Byzantine Rite
- Mass (liturgy), the Eucharistic service of the Roman Rite
