= Holy Leaven =

Ingredient used in ceremonies of several Christian denominations

Holy Leaven, also known as Malka (Classical Syriac: ܡܲܠܟܵܐ, pronounced [ˈmalkaː]), (Note: Also spelled Malkā, Malca, or Melka, literally 'king'. The name probably originates from the fact that most members of the Church of the East have not lived under the rule of a Christian monarch, thus elevating the sacramental bread as their "king".) is a powder added to the sacramental bread used in the Eucharist of both the Ancient Church of the East and the Assyrian Church of the East and historically in the Church of the East. Both churches hold the Holy Leaven to be one of their seven sacraments. The Syro-Malabar Church in India, which was historically a part of the Church of the East, also uses Holy Leaven to prepare sacramental bread in several churches whereas unleavened bread is also in use. There are two rituals associated with the Holy Leaven: its addition to sacramental bread before it is baked, and the annual renewal of the Holy Leaven itself.

The origin of the Holy Leaven supposedly goes back to the Last Supper. According to various traditions, John the Apostle kept a piece of bread given to him by Jesus and later mixed it with Jesus' blood after his death. This substance was divided between the apostles to be used in preparing sacramental bread ever since and successfully brought to the Christians of the East. The earliest historical mention of the Holy Leaven is from c. 900, and tradition that connects it with the Last Supper is fairly new, dating from the 13th and 14th centuries. It is likely that the Holy Leaven is a symbol instituted to unify congregations by the Patriarchate of Seleucia-Ctesiphon during vast missionary expansion of the Church of the East.

== Preparation and use ==
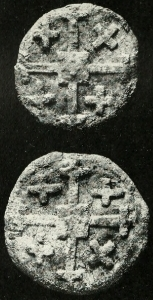
Sacramental bread of the Assyrian Church of the East prepared with Holy Leaven

The Assyrian Church of the East and the Ancient Church of the East use leavened bread for the Eucharist, like most churches of Eastern Christianity, but they are the only Churches to include the additional ingredient of Holy Leaven. Holy Leaven is a powder added to sacramental bread before it is baked. Despite the name, Holy Leaven does not actually contain a leavening agent. Instead, khmira, fermented dough from previously used sacramental bread, is added and acts as leaven. What the Holy Leaven does contain is remainder from the original Holy Leaven, renewed annually by mixing it with common ingredients. The original Holy Leaven is said to contain residue from the original bread used at the Last Supper, mixed with the blood of Jesus. The Church believes that this Holy Leaven was handed down to believers by Thomas the Apostle (Mar Thoma), Thaddeus of Edessa (Mar Addai) and Saint Mari (Mar Mari), traditionally regarded as its founders.

There are two rituals associated with the Holy Leaven: its addition to sacramental bread being baked for the day's Eucharist, and the annual renewal of the Holy Leaven itself. When sacramental bread is baked for the Eucharist, in the morning of a Holy Communion, the priest takes some of the Holy Leaven and says: "This dough is signed and hallowed with the old and holy leaven of our Lord Jesus Christ, which was given and handed down to us by our holy fathers Mar Addai and Mar Mari and Mar Thoma the Apostles, who made disciples of this eastern region: in the name of the Father and of the Son and of the Holy Ghost ... This broken portion is signed and hallowed with this Holy Leaven in the name of the Father and of the Son and of the Holy Ghost." Holy Leaven is added to the dough before it is baked.

The Holy Leaven is renewed annually on Passover Thursday by a bishop or parish priest by mixing some of the old Holy Leaven with a new mix. The mix consists of fine wheaten flour, salt, olive oil, and water. There are many prayers associated with the renewal of the Holy Leaven.

== History ==
Extent of Church of the East in the Middle Ages. Vast missionary activities of the church called for symbols of unity, and Holy Leaven might have emerged as one.

The historical origins of the Holy Leaven are unknown, as is the time the rituals were first performed. Nonetheless, different versions of tradition about its origins exist. In any case, the traditions are fairly young, dating to 13th and 14th centuries, the time of the Church of the East, the predecessor of the Ancient Church of the East and the modern Assyrian Church of the East.

One account is from the 13th century by Shlemon of Basra. According to it, John the Apostle had hidden a part of the portion of bread he had received from Jesus during the Last Supper. Then, after Jesus' resurrection during the Gospel account of Doubting Thomas, when Thomas the Apostle put his finger into one of the wounds of Jesus inflicted by the spear, blood dripped out. John then dipped the bread in the blood, and that mix became the Holy Leaven. According to this version, the Holy Leaven was taken to the Christians of the East by Thaddeus of Edessa and Saint Mari, but the other Seventy disciples of Jesus refused it, saying: "We will consecrate for ourselves whenever we wish."

Another account is from the 14th century and is written by Johannan Bar Zobi, based on an account supposedly originating from Peter the Apostle. According to it, John the Baptist collected some of the water that was dripping from Jesus after his baptism. Before John died, he passed the water on to John the Apostle. Then, during the Last Supper Jesus gave John two pieces of bread, asking him to eat one and keep the other. After Jesus had died and was taken down from the cross and pierced with the spear, the tradition holds that John witnessed both blood and water running from the wound unmixed. John then mixed the blood with the piece of bread he had kept and the water with the baptismal water he had preserved. After resurrection, Jesus told his disciples to use these two substances as "leaven": the water to be used in baptisms and the mix of blood and bread to be used in preparing Eucharistic bread, the Holy Leaven. The Holy Leaven was crushed into powder, mixed with flour and salt and divided among the apostles.

According to 14th century writer Abdisho bar Berika, the Holy Leaven was brought to the East by Apostles Thomas and Bartholomew as well as Thaddeus of Edessa and Saint Mari of the Seventy disciples. Abdisho bar Berika also posits a challenge to Western Christians who do not observe the sacrament of the Holy Leaven. According to him, it is necessarily either the case that the apostles disagreed in their view of the Eucharist, or that either the Church of the East or the Western Christians have abandoned the practice promoted by all of the apostles. The Church's position is that they have followed the example of the apostles and have changed nothing even in the face of persecution. The Church presents as evidence for their view the fact that Western Christians have not maintained a united tradition: some Western Churches celebrate the Eucharist with leavened bread while others use unleavened bread (azymites).

According to the Assyrian Church of the East, the Holy Leaven was taken to the Christians of the East by Thaddeus of Edessa. Apart from tradition that suggests continuity from the time of the ministry of Jesus, the earliest contemporary textual references to Holy Leaven are in two patriarchal canons of Yohanan bar Abgareh (died 905), one of which states: "A priest is obligated to prepare the Eucharistic bread for the Holy Qurbana and to mix the Holy Leaven with it, in addition to the simple leaven."

The missionary activities of the Church of the East, that reached as far as India, China, and Mongolia, provide a possible background. Such far and wide activities would have called for symbols that reminded them of the unity with the Church of the East. Thus it is possible that the Patriarchate of Seleucia-Ctesiphon instituted the rite of the Holy Leaven to serve as one.

According to a legend, Western Christianity (Pentarchy) antagonizes Nestorius because he took all the Holy Leaven with him upon leaving Constantinople, leaving them with none.

== Significance ==
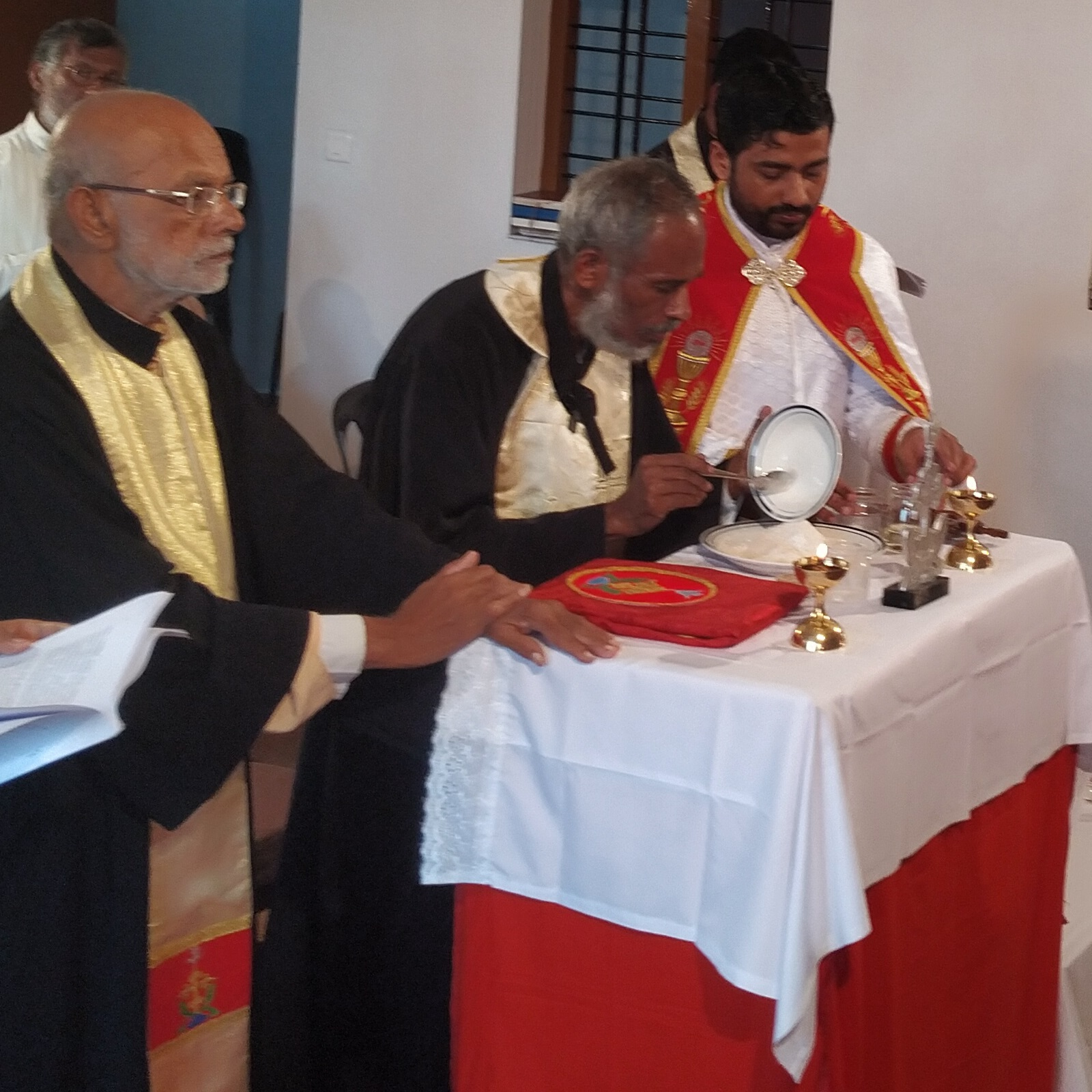
Rite of Renewal of Holy Leaven in the Syro-Malabar Church

The Holy Leaven is a sacrament in both the Ancient Church of the East and the Assyrian Church of the East and no other Church recognizes it as a sacrament. With the Holy Leaven and the sacrament of the Sign of the cross, also unique to the Ancient Church of the East and the Assyrian Church, its number of sacraments total seven. Canon law of the Church says that Holy Leaven must be added to sacramental bread for it to be consecrated. A Eucharist without the Holy Leaven is invalid.

The anaphora, or Eucharistic prayer, of the Assyrian Church of the East – included in its Liturgy of Addai and Mari – does not contain the Words of Institution that recount Jesus' words at the Last Supper. The Holy Leaven thus serves as a physical link with the Last Supper in lieu of a verbal one.

Historically, Holy Leaven could have functioned much the same way as the Catholic fermentum, a practice that may have persisted until the end of the 7th century. Although specifics about the fermentum are not known for certain, it was probably pieces of Eucharistic bread carried from one Latin diocese to another and added to the sacramental wine. This materially connected Eucharistic services in one area with the one presided over by the Pope, which was the only one where bread was consecrated. In a similar fashion, the addition of the Holy Leaven materially connects each Eucharist celebrated in the Assyrian Church of the East to the original Last Supper. Likewise, the Holy Leaven is similar to holy anointing oil, which is renewed from the oil of the horn, that the Church believes is inherited from John the Baptist.

In 2001, the Catholic Church decided that Chaldean Catholics–who are in full communion with Rome through the Chaldean Catholic Church–and Assyrian Church of the East Christians–who are independent of Rome–may, if necessary, celebrate the Eucharist together at either church. In arguing for the validity of the Eucharist in the Liturgy of Addai and Mari, the Catholic Church viewed the sacrament of Holy Leaven as a sign of continuity of tradition going back to the Last Supper.

== See also ==
- East Syriac Rite – liturgy of the Church of the East
- Eucharistic theology
- Holy Qurbana – Eucharist in East Syriac Christianity
- Malik – Semitic term for 'king'
- Origin of the Eucharist
- Parable of the Leaven – Parable taught by Jesus of Nazareth according to Christian gospels
