= Edessan Rite (disambiguation) =

Edessan Rite or East Syriac Rite is an Eastern Christian liturgical rite.

Edessan Rite may also refer to:

- Liturgy of Addai and Mari
- Anaphora of Sharar or Third Anaphora of Peter, employed in the Maronite Church of Antioch
