= Eucharist (disambiguation) =

The Eucharist is a Christian rite and sacrament.

Eucharist may also refer to:

- Eucharist (history), traditional and historical development
- Eucharist in the Catholic Church
- Eucharist (band), a Swedish death metal band
