= Orans =

Bodily position of prayer

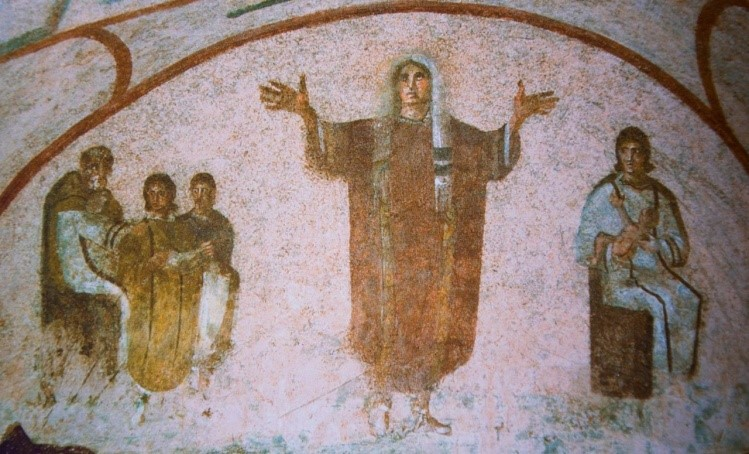
Fresco in the Catacomb of Priscilla showing a Christian woman wearing a headcovering and praying in the orant posture

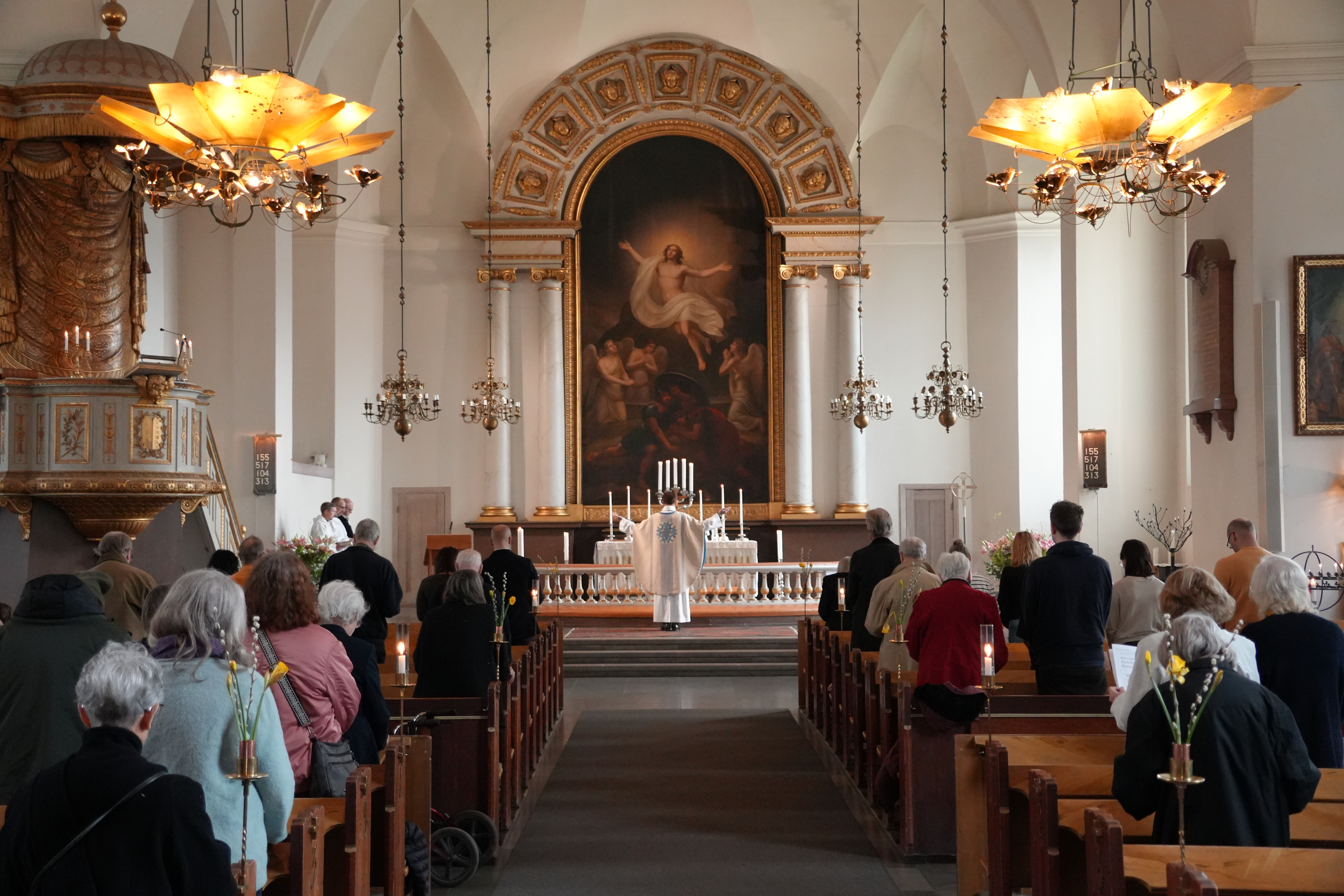
An Evangelical-Lutheran priest of the Church of Sweden praying in the Orans posture during the celebration of Mass on Easter Monday at Kungsholm Church, Stockholm (2026)

Orans, a loanword from Medieval Latin orans (Latin: [ˈoː.raːns]) translated as "one who is praying or pleading", also orant or orante, as well as lifting up holy hands, is a posture or bodily attitude of prayer, usually standing, with the elbows close to the sides of the body and with the hands outstretched sideways, palms up. The orans posture of prayer has a Scriptural basis in 1 Timothy 2 (1 Timothy 2:8): "I desire, then, that in every place the men should pray, lifting up holy hands without anger or argument" (NRSV).

It was common in early Christianity and can frequently be seen in early Christian art, being advised by several early Church Fathers, who saw it as "the outline of the cross". In modern times, the orans position is still preserved in Oriental Orthodoxy, as when Coptic Christian believers pray the seven canonical hours of the Agpeya at fixed prayer times. The orans also occurs within parts of the Catholic, Oriental Orthodox, Eastern Orthodox, Lutheran, and Anglican liturgies, Pentecostal and charismatic worship, and the ascetical practices of some religious groups.

== History ==
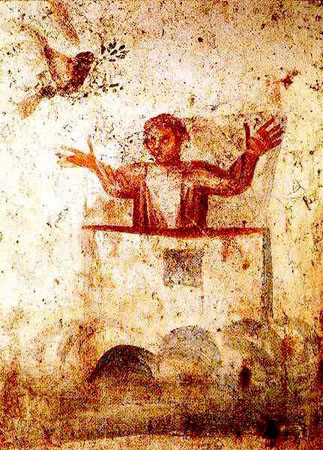
An early Christian painting of Noah praying in the gesture of orant

The orans posture is widespread in the art of the Ancient Near East, both in the Levant and in Egypt, from at least the Late Bronze Age. It was in origin a gesture of supplication or submission shown towards a deity (or the image of a deity) upon entering a temple.

The orans position is seen throughout the Old Testament, in Isaiah as well as in certain Psalms (such as Psalm 134:2–3, Psalm 28:2, Psalm 63:4–5, Psalm 141:2, Psalm 143:6). It has been argued that the gesture was adopted by Early Christianity from Second Temple Judaism. References in the New Testament are 1 Timothy 2:8, and Hebrews 12:12–13.

The biblical ordinance of lifting hands up in prayer was advised by many early Christian apologists, including Marcus Minucius Felix, Clement of Rome, Clement of Alexandria and Tertullian. Christians saw the position as representing the posture of Christ on the Cross; therefore, it was the favorite of early Christians. Some scholars also assert that the deference this pose exhibits—with the outstretched hands showing a sort of submission to a religious power—is intertwined with Roman ideas of pietas; this encapsulates notions of family values, civic honor and charitable behavior.

In Oriental Orthodoxy, Coptic Christian believers pray the seven canonical hours of the Agpeya at fixed prayer times in the orans position while standing. In Western Christianity, until at least the ninth century, the posture was used by entire congregations during celebrations of the Eucharist. By the twelfth century, however, the joining of hands began to replace the orans posture as the preferred position for prayer. The orans posture has continued to be used at certain points in the liturgies of the Roman Catholic and Eastern Orthodox Churches. In the Catholic Church, Masses in the Latin liturgical rites see the celebrating priest prays the orations, the Eucharistic Prayer, and the Lord's Prayer in the gesture of orans; in the Maronite Church's Holy Qurbana, the congregation together with the priest lift up their hands in the orans posture during various parts of the liturgy, such as the anaphora and Lord's Prayer. The orans gesture was preserved through the Reformation, in the liturgy of the Evangelical-Lutheran Churches and the Anglican Churches.

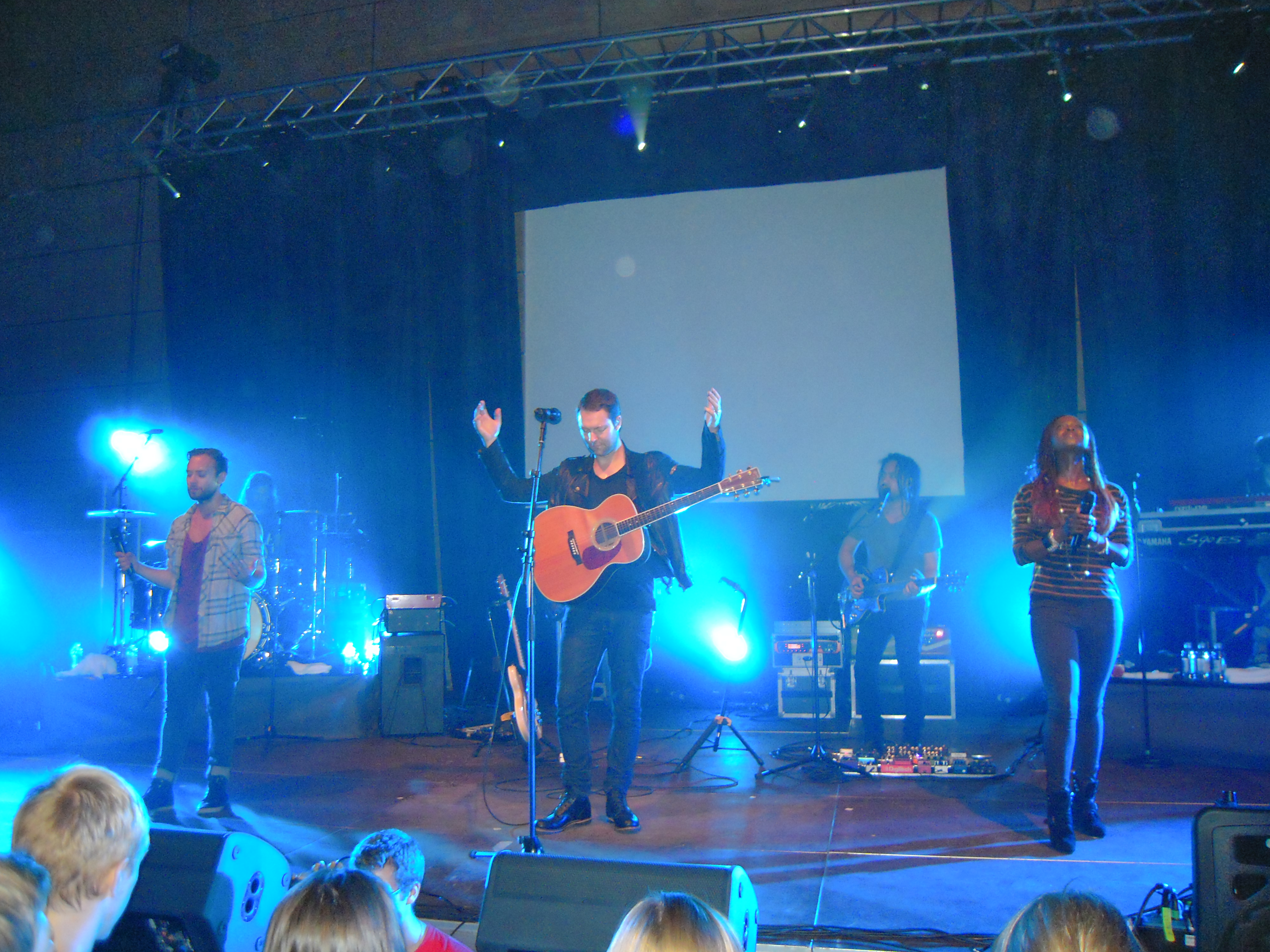
Reuben Morgan praying in the orans posture at an event in Zagreb, Croatia

The orans posture experienced a revival within Pentecostalism and Charismatic Christianity under the umbrella of the contemporary worship movement of the mid-20th century.

== Depictions in art ==
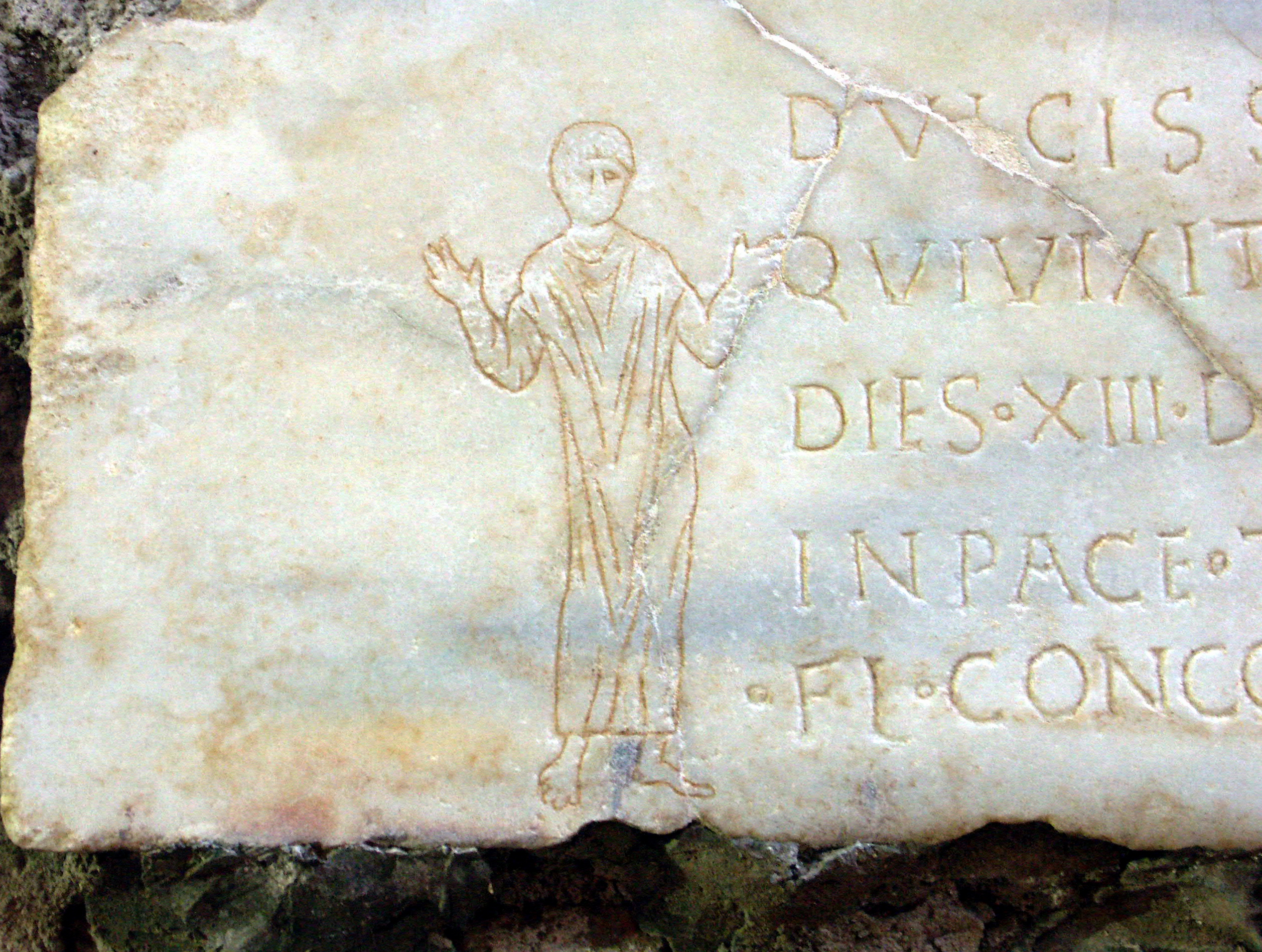
Christian man praying in the gesture of orant, Catacombs of Domitilla, Rome

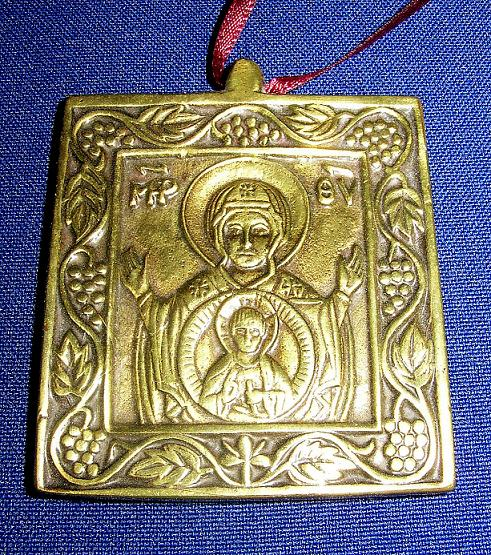
18th-century Byzantine-style bronze panagia from Jerusalem, showing the Virgin Mary in the Orans position

Orans was common in early Sumerian cultures: "...it appears that Sumerian people might have a statue carved to represent themselves and do their worshipping for them—in their place, as a stand in. An inscription on one such statue translates, 'It offers prayers.' Another inscription says, 'Statue, say unto my king (god)..." The custom of praying in antiquity with outstretched, raised arms was common to both Jews and Gentiles, and indeed the iconographic type of the Orans was itself strongly influenced by classic representations. But the meaning of the orans of Christian art is quite different from that of its prototypes. It is possible that medieval representations of a diminutive body, figure of the soul, issuing from the mouths of the dying were reminiscences of the orans as a symbol of the soul. Other theories imply a less metaphorical view, instead arguing that the heavily feminine iconography of orans sheds light on the state of female involvement in the early Church.

Numerous Biblical figures, for instance, depicted in the catacombs of Rome—Noah, Abraham, Isaac, Shadrach, Meshach and Abednego, and Daniel in the lion's den—are pictured asking the Lord to deliver the soul of the person on whose tombs they are depicted as he once delivered the particular personage represented. But besides these Biblical orans figures there exist in the catacombs many ideal figures (153 in all) in the ancient attitude of prayer, representing the deceased's soul in heaven, praying for their friends on earth. One of the most convincing proofs that the orans was regarded as a symbol of the soul is an ancient lead medal in the Vatican Museum showing the martyr St. Lawrence, under torture, while his soul, in the form of a female orans, is just leaving the body. An arcosolium in the Ostrianum cemetery represents an orans with a petition for her intercession: Victoriæ Virgini … Pete … The Acts of St. Cecilia speaks of souls leaving the body like virgins: Vidit egredientes animas eorum de corporibus, quasi virgines de thalamo ("He saw their souls coming out of their bodies, like virgins from the chamber"), and so also the Acts of Sts. Peter and Marcellinus. Other academic opinions, however, disagree with the metaphorical nature of the above theories; citing the large amount of female orans figures and their common characteristics, they argue that the prevalence of non-male figures indicates unacknowledged female leadership in the early church. While writings focusing female leaders is rare in early Christianity, scholars look to art to provide a more holistic picture; in particular, women appearing to supervise eucharist—in orans position—in catacomb iconography leads some to propose the existence of female leadership in the church. This represents a less metaphorical lens than that of the feminine orans representing the soul.

The earlier orantes were depicted in the simplest garb, and without any striking individual traits, but in the fourth century the figures become richly adorned, and of marked individuality, an indication of the approach of historic art. One of the most remarkable figures of the orans cycle, dating from the early fourth century, is interpreted by Wilpert as the Blessed Virgin interceding for the friends of the deceased. Directly in front of Mary is a boy, not in the orans attitude and supposed to be the Divine Child, while to the right and left are monograms of Christ.

The Platytéra, a hagiographic depiction on the Virgin Mary as Our Lady of the Sign which is standing in the orans gesture, usually placed on the half-dome above the altar of Byzantine-style churches, and facing down the nave.

== Gallery ==
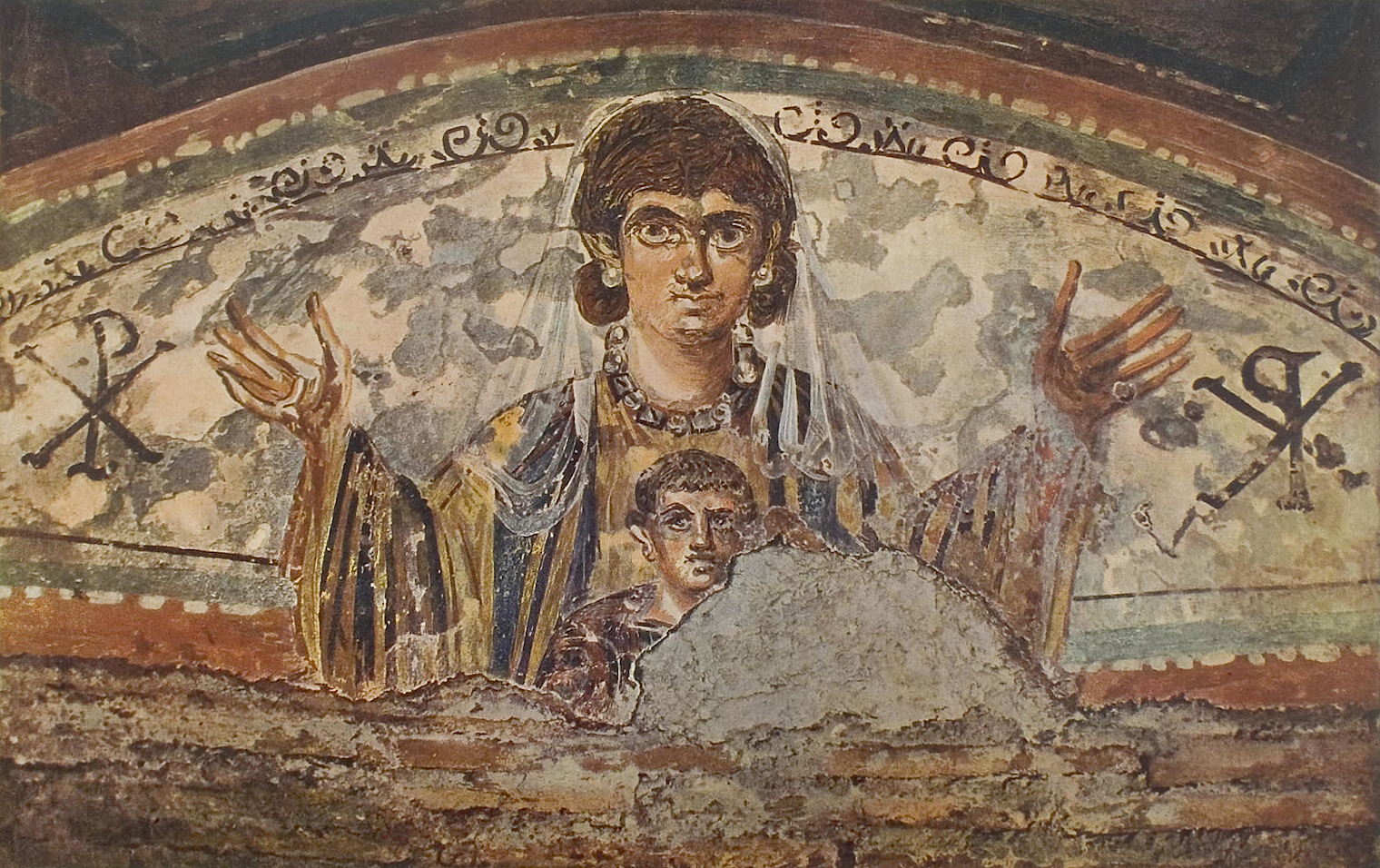
Orans (catacombs of Rome), first half of IV c.

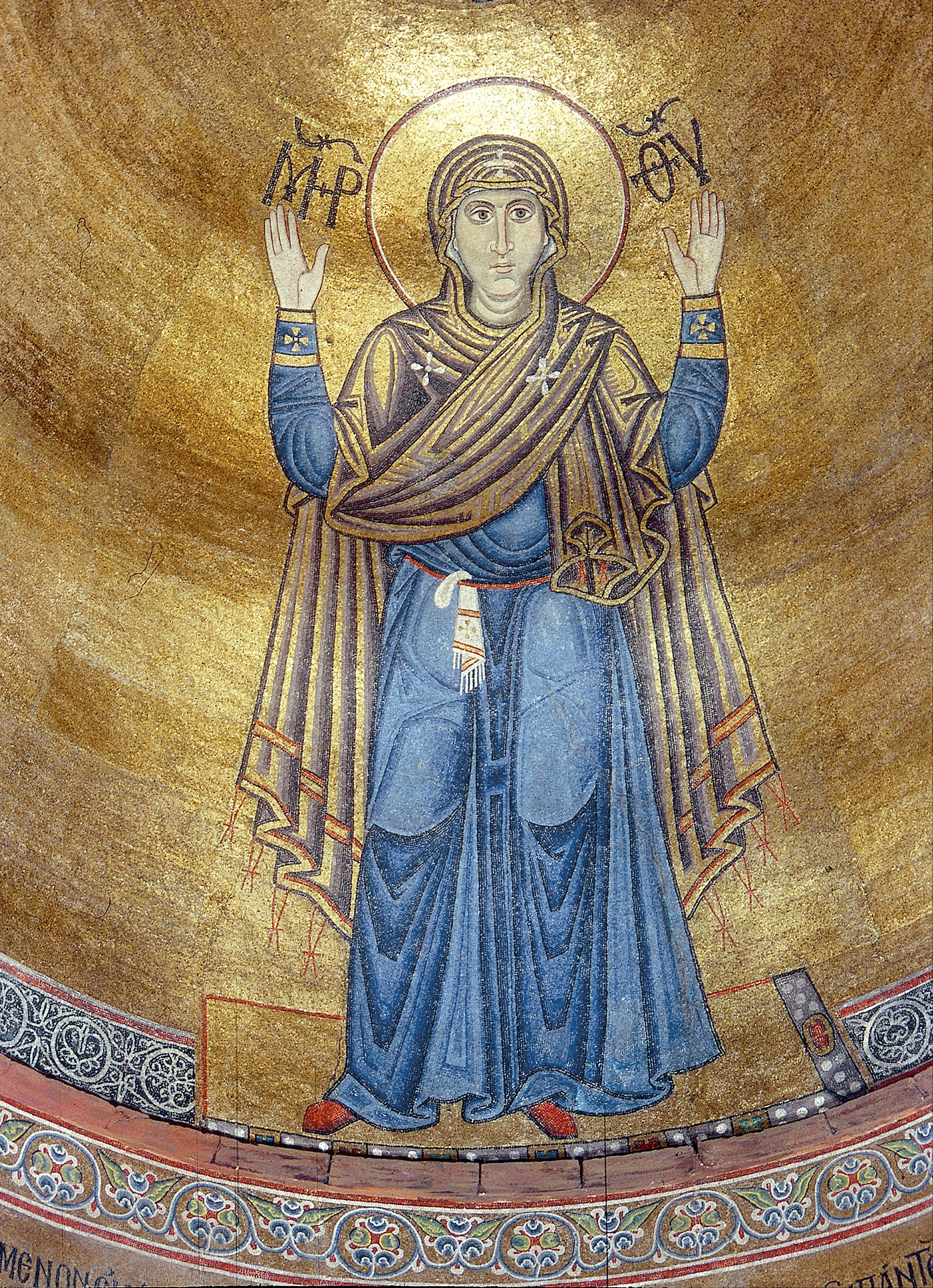
Orans of Kyiv. Mosaic. XI c.

Our Lady of the Sign icon. Veliky Novgorod. First half of XII c.

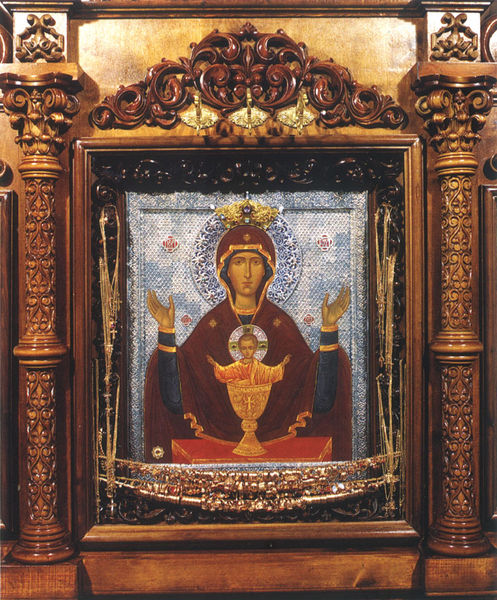
Inexhaustible Chalice icon. Serpukhov. XIX c.

== See also ==
- Panagia
- Worship
- Canonical digits
