= Sursum corda =

Latin phrase; Phrase from Christian liturgy

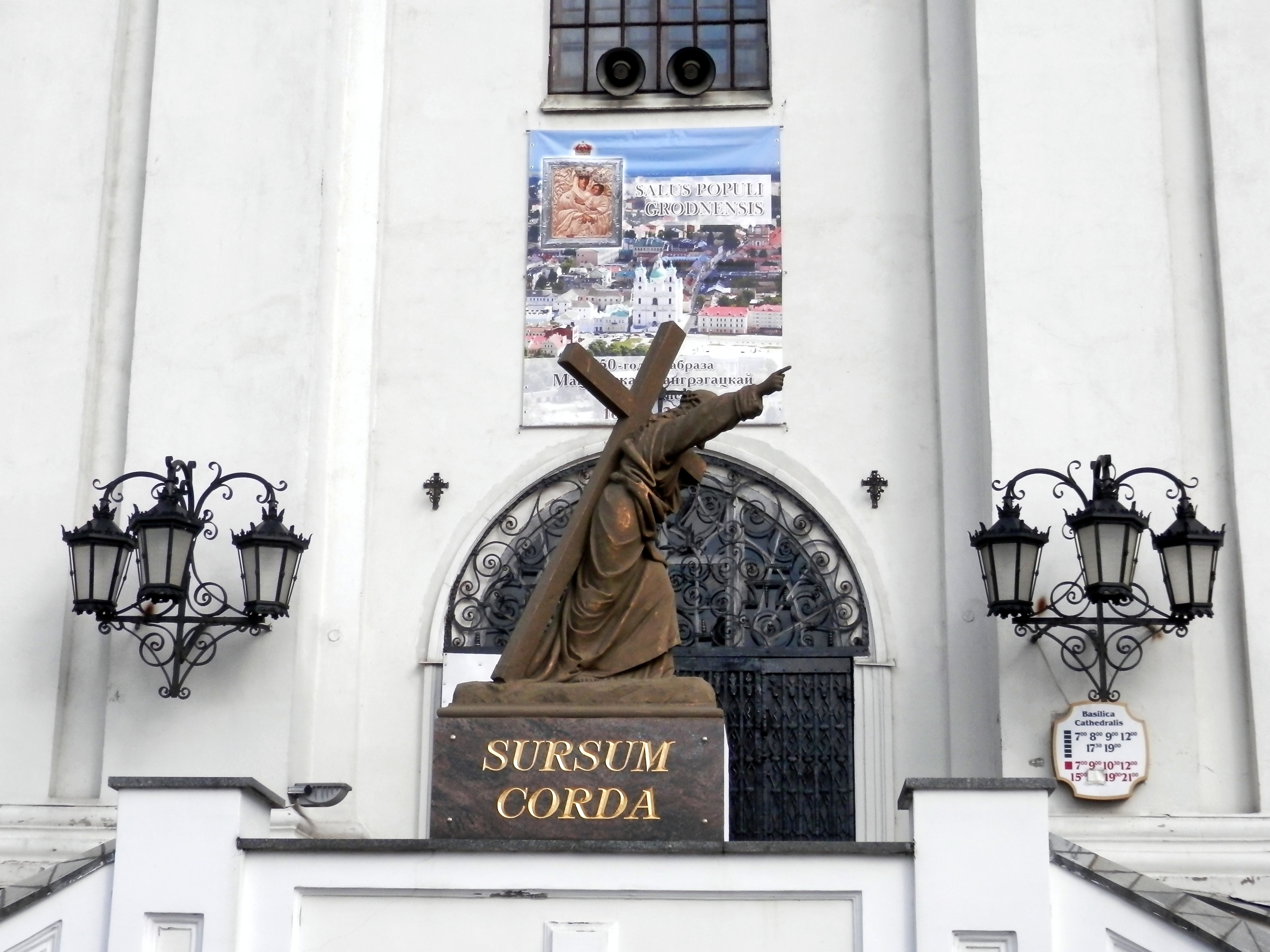
Statue directly references content.

The Sursum corda (Latin for "Lift up your hearts" or literally, "Upwards hearts") is the opening dialogue to the Preface of the Eucharistic Prayer or Anaphora in Christian liturgies, dating back at least to the third century and the Anaphora of the Apostolic Tradition. The dialogue is recorded in the earliest liturgies of the Catholic Church in the west and east, and is found in all ancient rites.

== Definition ==
The Sursum Corda (Latin: "Lift up your hearts" or literally, "Up hearts!", that is, "Hearts up!") is the opening dialogue to the Preface of the anaphora, also known as the "Eucharistic Prayer", in the Christian liturgy, dating back at least to the 3rd century and the Anaphora of the Apostolic Tradition. The dialogue is recorded in the earliest liturgies of the Christian Church, and is found in all ancient rites.

Though the detail varies slightly from rite to rite, the dialogue's structure is generally threefold, comprising an exchange of formal greeting between priest and people; an invitation to lift the heart to God, the people responding in agreement; and an invitation to give thanks, with the people answering that it is proper to do so. The third exchange indicates the people's assent to the priest continuing to offer the remainder of the Eucharistic Prayer on their behalf, and the need of such assent accounts for the universality of the dialogue.

In the Western Rites, the wording of the Sursum Corda is:

Speaker	Latin	English
Priest	Dominus vobiscum	The Lord be with you
People	Et cum spiritu tuo	And with your spirit
Priest	Sursum corda	Lift up your hearts / Hearts, upwards! (lit.)
People	Habemus ad Dominum	We lift them up to the Lord / We have [them] at the Lord (lit.)
Priest	Gratias agamus Domino Deo nostro	Let us give thanks to the Lord our God
People	Dignum et iustum est	It is right and just

== See also ==
- Canon of the Mass
- Divine Liturgy
- Holy Qurbana
