= Hallowing of Nestorius =

Anaphora in the East Syriac Rite

The Hallowing of Nestorius (Classical Syriac: ܩܘܼܕܵܫܵܐ ܕܡܵܪܝ ܢܸܣܛܘܿܪܝܼܣ, romanized: Qúdāšā d-Māri Nesṭoryus) is one of the Eucharistic liturgies used in the Church of the East. It is currently employed in the Holy Qurbana of the Chaldean Catholic Church, Assyrian Church of the East, Ancient Church of the East, and the Syro-Malabar Church, which are descendants of the Church of the East. It is a part of the East Syriac Rite, formally attributed to Nestorius, Patriarch of Constantinople and is traditionally celebrated for the Feast of the Epiphany, Commemoration of St. John the Baptist, Commemoration of the Greek Teachers: Mar Diodore, Mar Theodore the interpreter and Mar Nestorius, and also for the Wednesday liturgy of the Rogation of the Ninevites, and the Feast of the Passover (Holy Thursday).

The authorship is questioned and purportedly Pseudepigrapha.

== See also ==
- Liturgy of Addai and Mari (or the Hallowing of the Apostles)
- Hallowing of Theodore of Mopsuestia
