= Canonical digits =

Catholic bodily position of prayer

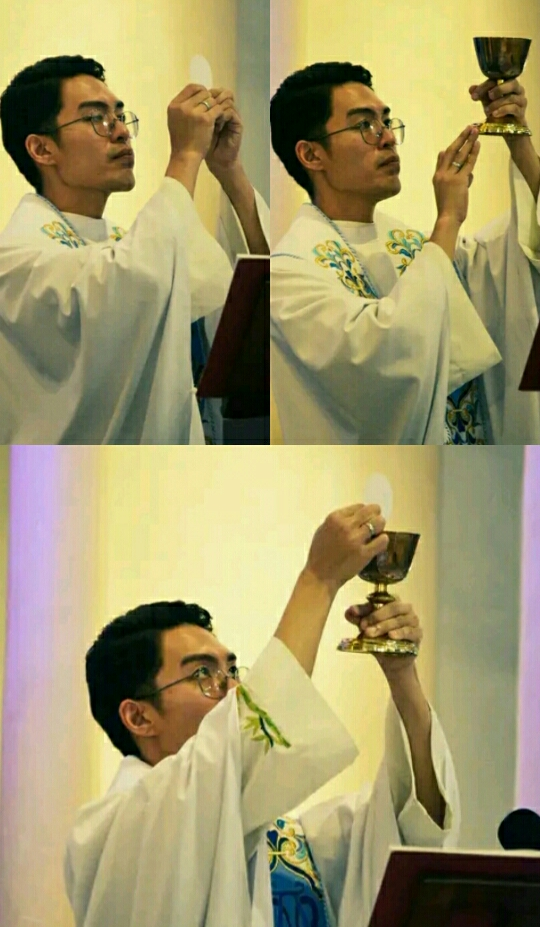
Priest in the gesture of keeping his thumb and index joined during the Consecration of the Holy Eucharist in Novus Ordo Mass

Canonical digits, also referred to as liturgical digits, are a posture or bodily attitude of prayer used during the celebration of the rite of the Holy Mass. This gesture is performed by any Catholic priest after consecration and before ablutions, standing and joining his thumb and index finger in a circle, and holding the other fingers straight away from the palm.

== Description ==
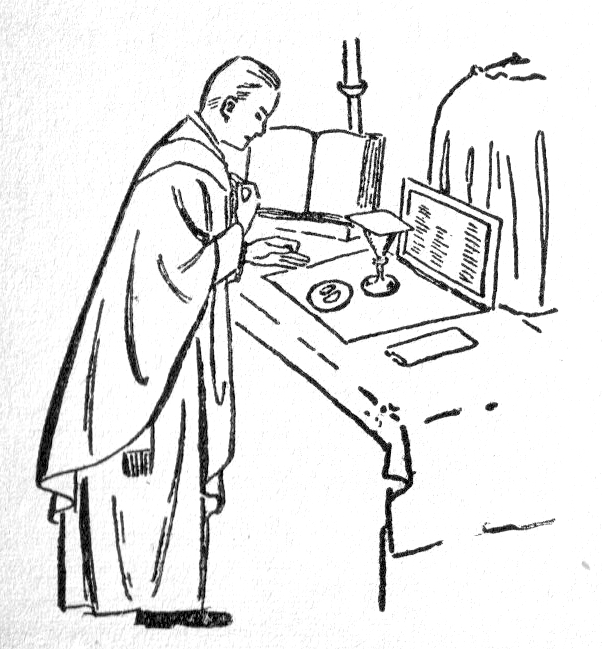
Even when the priest strikes his chest three times saying Domine, non sum dignus (Lord, I am not worthy to receive you) before communion, he holds on to the canonical digits at that time too.

Canonical digits are used during the rite of the Holy Mass by joining thumb and index in both hands separately while holding the remaining three fingers straight up.

During the lavabo, the priest washes the ends of the thumbs and index fingers, then wipes them with the manuterge. As he begins the rite of consecration, the priest wipes the thumb and index of each hand making a sign of the cross on the corporal saying "qui pridie quam pateretur" (at the time he was betrayed). From this moment of consecration to the ablution after communion, the priest does not separate the thumb and index finger in order to avoid any particles of the host from falling.

When the priest must hold the chalice with one hand, he takes it by the knot. When he holds it with both hands, he takes it, as a general rule, with the right hand by the knot, and with the left by the foot. Before the consecration and after the ablution, he places his thumb in front of the knot, and all the other fingers behind.

== History ==
=== A milenary practice of reverence in the West ===
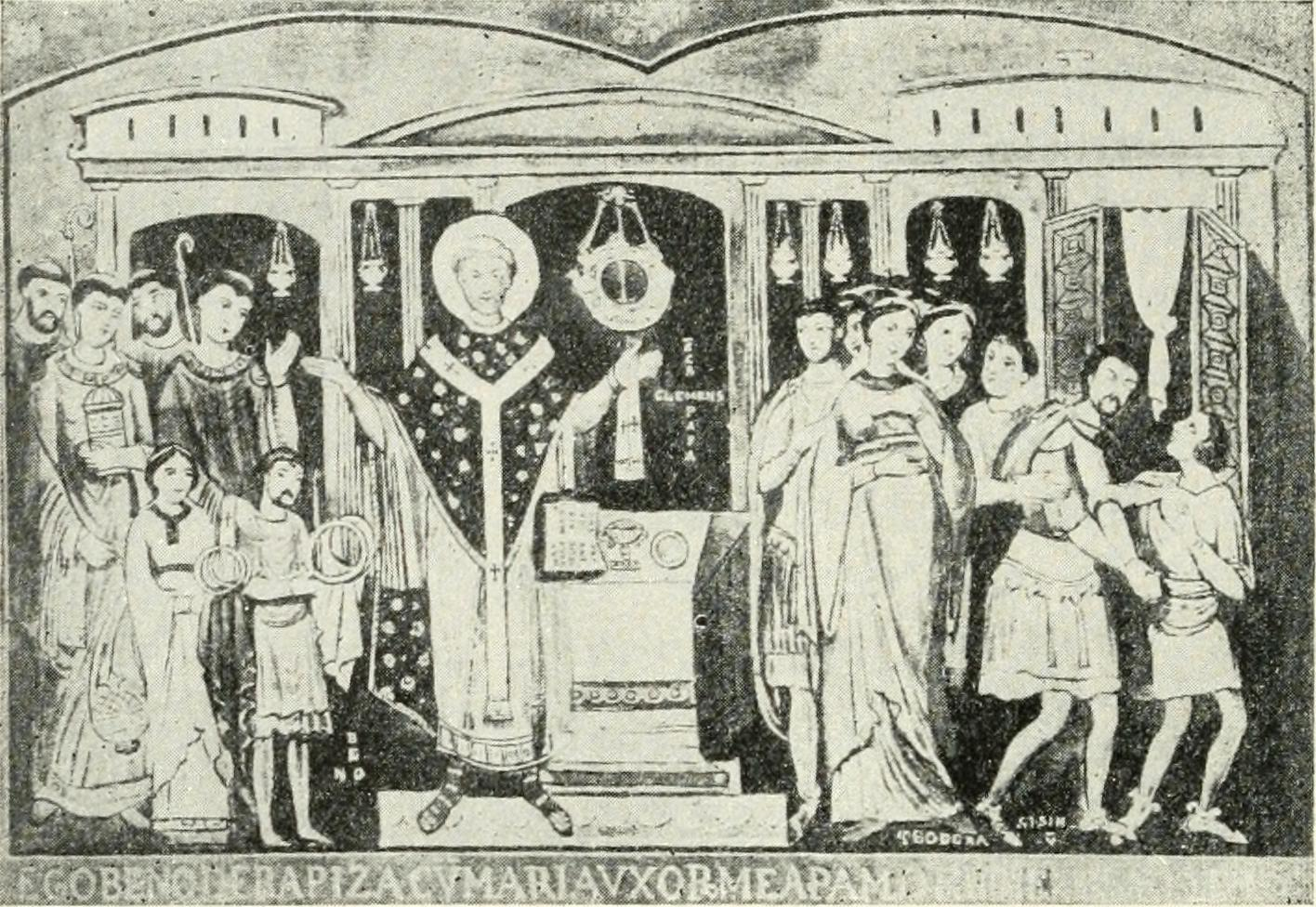
On this fresco in San Clemente al Laterano, the priest is seen extending his hands rather than keeping his thumb and index joined.

The practise of canonical digits is not found among the Eastern churches and little evidence is available to prove this practise before the East–West Schism in 1054. In fact, iconographic witnesses would suggest the practise was not universal even in the West during the first millennium. Thus for example, it can be observed on a fresco in the lower church of San Clemente al Laterano in Rome that a priest at the altar at the end of the canon does not hold his finger and index with this caution. A new practise evolved in the 11th century. According to the Cluniac Customary, written about 1068 by the monk Bernhard, the priest at the consecration should hold the host quattuor primis digitis ad hoc ipsum ablutis (with the four first fingers previously rinsed)." After the consecration, even when praying with outstretched arms, some priests began to hold those fingers which had "touched" the Lord's Body, pressed together, others even began this at the ablution of the fingers at the offertory. In one form or another the idea soon became a general rule. The practise was criticized c. 1085 by Bernold of Constance in his Micrologus de ecclesiasticis observationibus.

In the 13th century, for French liturgist Guillaume Durand, thumb and forefinger may be parted after the consecration only quando oportet hostiam tangi vel signa fieri, which means that the fingers can be disjoined when making the sign of the cross. Similar provisions were made in the Ordo of Giacomo Gaetani Stefaneschi in 1311, in the Liber ordinarius of Liege as well as in the Dominican sources of the same, dated about 1256, all insisting that the liturgical digits be kept after the Lavabo.

In the Supplementum of the Summa Theologica, the disciples of Thomas Aquinas explain the rationale for this "gesture of Franco-Roman piety signifying the dispositions of the religious soul" answering an objection against those who objected unnecessary "gesticulations": "the thumb and first finger, after the consecration, because, with them, he had touched the consecrated body of Christ; so that if any particle cling to the fingers, it may not be scattered: and this belongs to the reverence for this sacrament."

=== A practice universally recognized with the Tridentine Mass ===
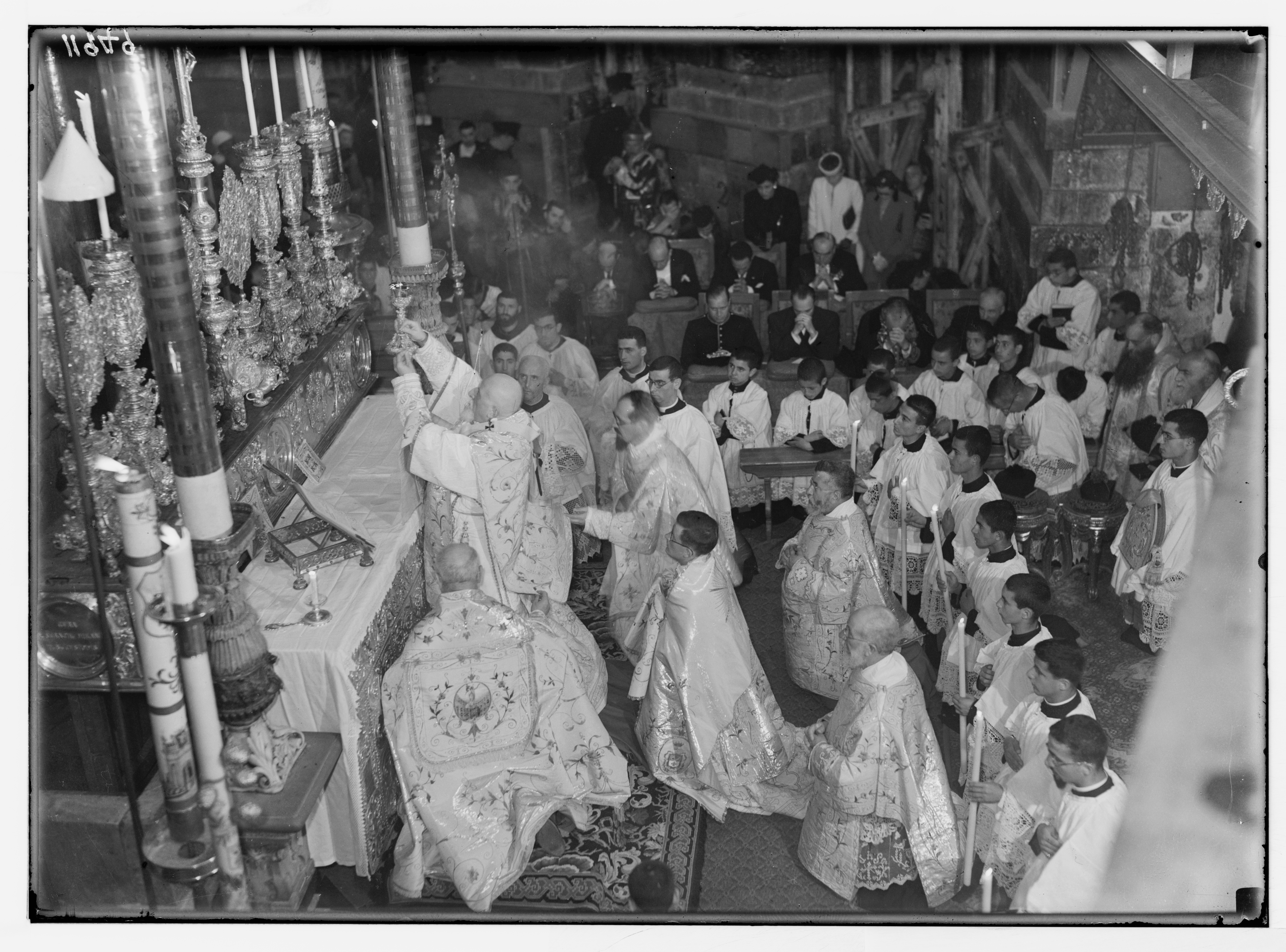
Canonical digits in Jerusalem during the Solemn High Mass on Easter Sunday, 1941

The practise was made into a universal rubric by the Roman Missal promulgated by the Council of Trent which ended in 1563 insisting on the belief in the real presence in every particle of the Eucharist, in reply to doubts spread by the Protestant Reformation: "If anyone deny that Jesus Christ is contained whole and entire under each species in the adorable sacrament of the Eucharist, and also under each particle of these species, after they are divided, let him be anathema". The Roman Missal made the practise of liturgical digits somewhat more strict: even the signa no longer formed an exception, the fingers simply remain closed: semper faciat si aliquod fragmentum digitis adhæreat, which was confirmed until the 1962 edition of the Roman Missal by Pope John XXIII.

Canon law made this practise so important that being unable to use their hand or thumb or index finger constituted an impediment to Sacred orders.

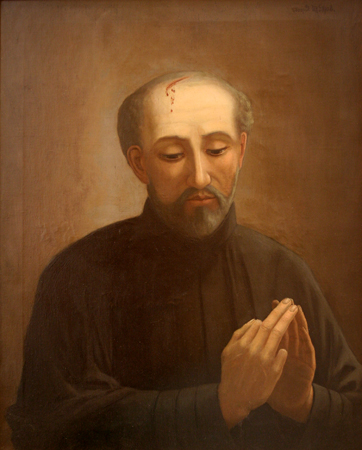
Father Isaac Jogues S.J., represented with the wounds of his martyrdom, and keeping his hands in prayer with canonical digits

The martyr of Isaac Jogues in 1646 comes as an exemplum for the use of canonical digits. Jogues was captured by the Mohawks who severed his thumb and finger nails and gnawed the ends of his fingers off, rendering him unable to celebrate Mass properly. As Church law required the Blessed Sacrament be touched with the thumb and forefinger, he returned to France to implore Pope Urban VIII for an indult. He then returned to convert his captors and was martyred, thus canonizing this practise in the blood of martyrs.

However, in 1700, French Carthusian Lazare André Bocquillot expressed a certain criticism of a "new practise" born of scrupulosity which did not imitate the gestures of Jesus Christ and for that reason, the Carthusians held on to the orans position with open hands. In any case, the practise taught described in manuals and taught in seminaries through to the 20th century.

=== Progressive abandonment of a nimia cautela ===
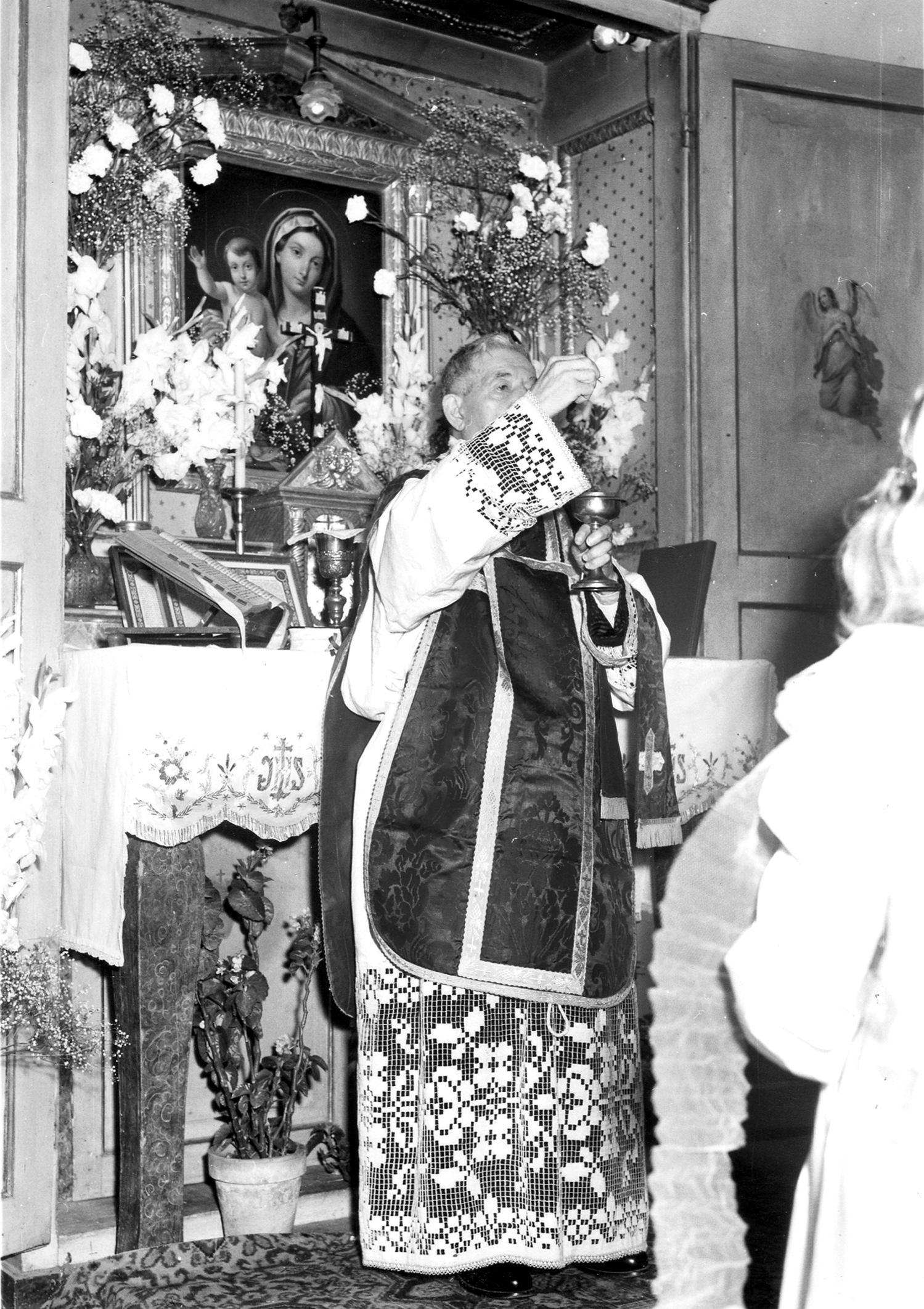
Canonical digits in Italy in 1965

The last time the canonical digits were insisted upon as mandatory by the Sacred Congregation for the Discipline of the Sacraments was in 1962 in an answer to a dubia regarding the use of modern chalices with a node, explaining that "it suffices that the priest can satisfactorily hold the chaild with his thumb and index finger joined". With the Roman Instruction Inter ecumenici, published by this Congregation on September 26, 1964, a series of adaptations intended to be introduced into the sacred rites were decided. As a premise of the liturgical reform provided for by the Conciliar Constitution on the Liturgy Sacrosanctum Concilium, these adaptations came into force on March 7, 1965. Further adaptations were added three years later in May 1967 with the instruction Tres abhinc annos, according to which, after the consecration, the celebrant was authorized not keep his thumb and index finger together. But if any fragment remains attached to the fingers, he should place them on the paten.

French author Jacques Perret lamented what he called "the liberation of the thumb and the index",

We had understood from childhood that these two fingers, as if sealed by the new alliance, no longer wanted to grasp anything, no longer touched anything that was of this world, at least until the ablutions. We saw in it the summary of an infinitely devout precaution, humbly limited in time because divine institutions must have their economy here below, but the time that these two privileged fingers remained joined was sufficient and necessary to bear witness to an ineffable contact. And from childhood we were sensitive to the light effort which slightly complicated the ritual manipulations to better convince us that transubstantiation was accomplished. And there again we would no longer have the right to be faithful to childhood.

In 2012, in the wake of the motu proprio Summorum Pontificum promulgated by Pope Benedict XVI, many priests, and bishops, such as Bishop Marc Aillet, recommended the return of this old practise, out of mutual enrichment between old and new rites of the Mass. Many priests celebrating the Roman rite therefore still use canonical digits by devotion alone for the real presence as it is no longer required by text and rubrics of the Roman Canon.

== Interpretation ==
=== A reverend discipline ===
First and foremost, the canonical digits are a sign of reverence imposed by the discipline of the Catholic Church. The gesture is performed to avoid any of the particles falling off from the paten, the corporal or even the altar, by using the necessary precautions. According to the Roman proverb, nimia cautela non nocet: excessive caution cannot hurt.

=== An attitude of prayer ===
According to Romano Guardini, the outward attitude of the body in Catholic liturgy is also presumed to be informed by an inward attitude of the soul. The canonical digits are also thefore often interpreted as a sign of the priest's focus on the real presence during the rite of consecration.

== See also ==
- Panagia
- Worship
