= Yoḥannan bar Zoʿbi =

Start of the memre of Bar Zoʿbi in a 1687 manuscript now in the Beinecke Rare Book and Manuscript Library

Yoḥannan bar Zoʿbi (fl. 1246), commonly Rabban Yoḥannan and sometimes anglicized John bar Zobi, was a monk, grammarian, philosopher, theologian and liturgist of the Church of the East who wrote in Syriac.

== Life ==
Bar Zoʿbi was born in the late 12th or early 13th century. His place of birth is unknown. He taught Yaʿqub bar Shakko, who died in 1241. There is a manuscript of his grammatical works now kept in the Vatican Library (Vat. sir. 194) that was copied in 1600 from an original manuscript of 1246. It contains a short contemporary biographical note about Bar Zoʿbi, which shows that he was alive at that date.

Bar Zoʿbi studied under Shemʿon Shanqlawi from the village of Shaqlawa in the province of Adiabene. Shemʿon wrote his Chronicon at Bar Zoʿbi's request, because his pupil did not have access to the Chronicon of Eusebius of Caesarea. Bar Zoʿbi later professed as a priest and monk in the East Syriac monastery of Beth Qoqa in the same region. The biographical notice in Vat. sir. 194 praises him for his eremitism, asceticism and spiritual direction. He was equally famous for his scholarship. According to Bar Hebraeus, he attracted even students from the Syrian Orthodox Church, such as Yaʿqub bar Shakko, to study grammar and logic in Beth Qoqa.

Bar Zoʿbi died after 1246 at a place unknown.

== Works ==
Bar Zoʿbi was "one of the most learned writers of his time" in the Church of the East. One of his most important works is his Great Grammar, a prose grammar of Syriac. He also wrote a Little Grammar, an epitome of his larger work in heptasyllabic verse for young students. The Great Grammar follows the traditional Syriac system and rejects that of Elias of Nisibis modelled on Arabic grammars. In his catalogue of Syriac writers, ʿAbdishoʿ bar Brikha, describes Bar Zoʿbi as having collected the works of others into a single volume. According to Bar Zoʿbi, the first Syriac grammar was written by Aḥudemeh. From Bar Zoʿbi's extract of this lost work, it can be seen to have been heavily influenced by Greek grammar. Bar Zoʿbi quotes an extract from the otherwise lost grammar of John the Stylite and also makes use of the grammars of Severus Sebokht, Eliya bar Shinaya, Eliya of Ṭirhan and Rabban Denḥa and various commentaries on Aristotle. Like most of his works, the Great Grammar, except for a part on punctuation, has never been published.

Besides his highly esteemed work on grammar, Bar Zoʿbi wrote on philosophy, theology and liturgy. His preferred metres were heptasyllabic (for theological and grammatical works) and dodecasyllabic (for homilies). He wrote philosophy in both prose and verse, including a heptasyllabic poem On the Four Problems of Philosophy and a dodecasyllabic one On Philosophy, which deals with causality. In theology, he advocated the Christology of the Church of the East, sometimes called Nestorianism, against the Miaphysitism of the Syrian Orthodox Church. In a short two-page treatise, Shuʾālē luqbal harrātīqē w-Ishmaʿlāyē ('Questions against the heretics and Ishmaelites'), he addresses five questions that might be posed by Muslims. In answer to the question "Why was our Lord born from a woman and not created in the way of Adam?", he answers that it corrects those who abhor women and balances the fact that sin entered the world through a woman. His theological magnum opus is the compendium Zqorā mlaḥḥmā ('well woven fabric'), which was widely copied and quoted in the Church of the East.

Bar Zoʿbi wrote several memre (verse homilies) on the subject of faith and on the liturgy, including commentaries on the fermentum, baptism and communion. A letter he wrote to Shemʿon Shanqlawi also survives. The latter has been translated into English. Bar Zoʿbi may be the anonymous author who completed the lexicographical Book of Similar Words of Ḥunayn ibn Isḥāq, according to a note in the Berlin manuscript Sachau 72.

Several short anonymous tracts have been tentatively attributed to Bar Zoʿbi: a list of conjunctions, a discussion of nouns and verbs, a glossary of philosophical and theological terms and a discussion of the structure of Aristotle's philosophy.

== Bibliography ==
- Assemani, Giuseppe Simone, ed. (1725). Bibliotheca Orientalis Clementino-Vaticana, Vol. III. Sacred Congregation for the Propagation of the Faith.
- Badger, G. P., ed. (1852). The Nestorians and Their Rituals. Vol. 2. Joseph Masters. ISBN 9780790544823.
- Barsoum, Ignatius Aphram (2003) [1956]. The Scattered Pearls: A History of Syriac Literature and Sciences. Translated by Matti Moosa (2nd rev. ed.). Gorgias Press.
- Baumstark, Anton (1922). Geschichte der Syrischen Literatur. Bonn: Weber.
- Brock, Sebastian P. (1997). A Brief Outline of Syriac Literature. St. Ephrem's Ecumenical Research Institute.
- Brock, Sebastian P. (2011). "Yoḥannan bar Zoʿbi". In Sebastian P. Brock; Aaron M. Butts; George A. Kiraz; Lucas Van Rompay (eds.). Gorgias Encyclopedic Dictionary of the Syriac Heritage: Electronic Edition. Gorgias Press. Published online by Beth Mardutho, 2018.
- Chabot, Jean-Baptiste (1934). Littérature syriaque. Librairie Bloud & Gay.
- Duval, Paul-Rubens (2013) [1900]. Holmey, Olivier (ed.). Syriac Literature. Gorgias Eastern Christian Studies. Translated by Olivier Holmey. Gorgias Press. doi:10.31826/9781463234102. ISBN 9781463234102.
- Farina, Margherita (2020). "Bar Zoʿbi's Grammar and the Syriac 'Texture of Knowledge' in the 13th Century". In Salam Rassi; Želijko Paša (eds.). Christianity, Islam, and the Syriac Renaissance: The Impact of ʿAbdīshōʿ bar Brīkhā. Papers Collected on His 700th Anniversary. Pontificio Istituto Orientale.
- Sākō, Louis (1984). "Bibliographie du dialogue islamo-chrétien". 10: 273–292.
- Seleznyov, Nikolai N. (ed.). Yōḥannān bar Zōʿbī and His "Explanation of the Mysteries": Critical Text, Russian Translation from Syriac, and Investigation (in Russian). Russian State University for the Humanities, Institute for Oriental and Classical Studies.
- Teule, Herman G. B. (2012). "Yoḥannān bar Zoʿbī". In David Thomas; Alex Mallett (eds.). Christian–Muslim Relations: A Bibliographical History. Vol. 4 (1200–1350). Brill. pp. 365–367. doi:10.1163/1877-8054_cmri_COM_25281.
- Van Rompay, Lucas (2011). "Shemʿon Shanqlawi". In Sebastian P. Brock; Aaron M. Butts; George A. Kiraz; Lucas Van Rompay (eds.). Gorgias Encyclopedic Dictionary of the Syriac Heritage: Electronic Edition. Gorgias Press. Published online by Beth Mardutho, 2018.
- Walters, James E.; et al. (2016). "John bar Zoʿbi — ܝܘܚܢܢ ܒܪ ܙܘܥܒܝ". In David A. Michelson; Nathan P. Gibson (eds.). The Syriac Biographical Dictionary, Volume II: A Guide to Syriac Authors. Syriaca.org.
- Webb, D. (1975). "The Mimra on the Interpretation of the Mysteries by Rabban Johannan Bar Zo'bi and Its Symbolism". Le Muséon. 88: 297–326.
- Wright, William (1894). A Short History of Syriac Literature (PDF). Adam and Charles Black. Archived from the original (PDF) on 2020-10-26.
