= Origin of the Eucharist =

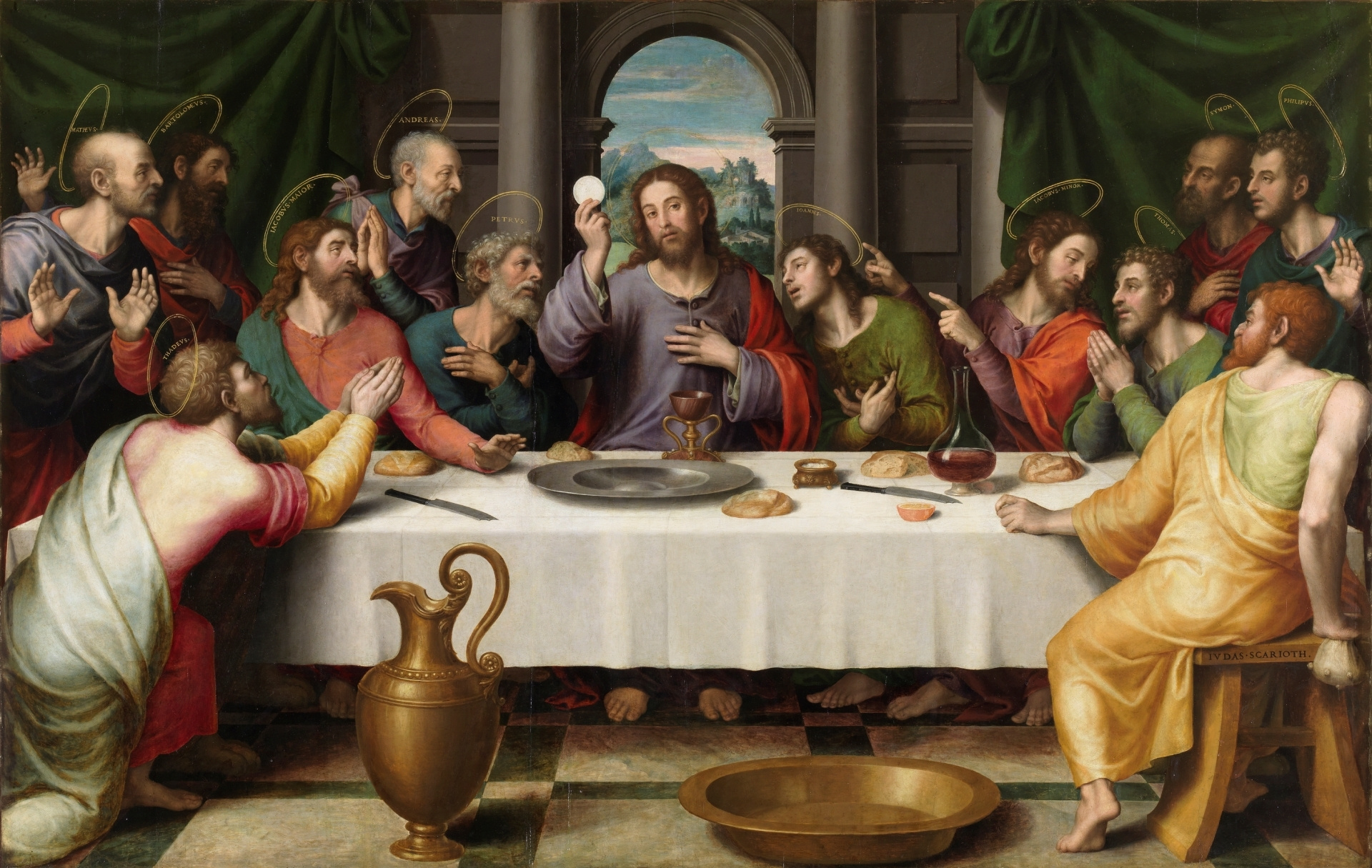
Jesus with the Eucharist at the Last Supper by Juan de Juanes, mid-late 16th century

Some Christian denominations place the origin of the Eucharist in the Last Supper of Jesus with his disciples, at which he is believed to have taken bread and given it to his disciples, telling them to eat of it, because it was his body, and to have taken a cup and given it to his disciples, telling them to drink of it because it was the cup of the covenant in his blood.

The earliest extant written account of a Christian eucharistia (Greek for 'thanksgiving') is that in the First Epistle to the Corinthians (around AD 55), in which Paul the Apostle relates "eating the bread and drinking the cup of the Lord" in the celebration of a "Supper of the Lord" to the Last Supper of Jesus some 25 years earlier. Paul considers that in celebrating the rite they were fulfilling a mandate to do so. The Acts of the Apostles presents the early Christians as meeting for "the breaking of bread" as some sort of ceremony.

Writing around the middle of the second century, Justin Martyr gives the oldest descriptions of something that can be recognised as the rite that is in use today, according to K.W. Noakes. Earlier sources, such as the Didache, 1 Clement and Ignatius of Antioch provide glimpses of what Christians were doing in their Eucharists. Later sources, Tertullian and the Apostolic Tradition, offer some details from around the year 200. Even before the Church "went public" after the conversion of Constantine the Great in the second decade of the fourth century, it was clear that the Eucharist was a central part of Christian life and worship.

Scholars seeking to understand Christian practice debate whether Jesus meant to institute a ritual at his Last Supper; whether the Last Supper was an actual historical event in any way related to the undisputed early "Lord's Supper" or "Eucharist" and have asked if the Eucharist had its origins in a pagan context, where dinners to memorialize the dead were common.

== Old Testament accounts ==
=== Book of Judges ===
The supper at Emmaus (Luke 24:28–35) is reminiscent of the Book of Judges: the vocation of Gideon and the prophecy made to Manoach and to the barren woman of the birth of Samson. In both cases, the angel of the Lord appears and is not recognized as such. He carries a message: deliverance for Israel for Gideon and birth of Samson for Manoach and his wife. Each time, those who are visited prepare a sacrifice at the request of the mysterious host: kid and unleavened bread for Gideon; kid and vegetable offering for Manoach. In both cases, it is the sacrifice that reveals the identity of the host:

- "And the angel of God said unto him, Take the flesh and the unleavened cakes, and lay them upon this rock, and pour out the broth. And he did so. Then the angel of Jehovah put forth the end of the staff that was in his hand, and touched the flesh and the unleavened cakes; and there went up fire out of the rock, and consumed the flesh and the unleavened cakes; and the angel of Jehovah departed out of his sight. And Gideon saw that he was the angel of Jehovah; and Gideon said, Alas, O Lord Jehovah! forasmuch as I have seen the angel of Jehovah face to face."
- "So Manoah took the kid with the meal-offering, and offered it upon the rock unto Jehovah: and the angel did wondrously, and Manoah and his wife looked on. For it came to pass, when the flame went up toward heaven from off the altar, that the angel of Jehovah ascended in the flame of the altar: and Manoah and his wife looked on; and they fell on their faces to the ground. But the angel of Jehovah did no more appear to Manoah or to his wife. Then Manoah knew that he was the angel of Jehovah."

These two events have parallel scenes in the New Testament: the same day that the empty tomb of Jesus is discovered, two disciples "were going to a village called Emmaus". A mysterious traveler joins them and questions them about the cause of their dejection. After listening to them, the traveller explains the events from the scriptures, then "when he had sat down with them to meat, he took the bread and blessed; and breaking it he gave to them. And their eyes were opened, and they knew him; and he vanished out of their sight".

These prefigurations and their realization shed light on the sacrificial nature of the Last Supper: on one hand, the Eucharist shows the paradoxical nature of this breaking of the bread which attests to a presence while keeping it invisible to the eyes of the two disciples; on the other hand, the sacrifice makes it possible to recognize the one who has manifested himself: it is at the moment when Jesus gives thanks, breaks the bread and gives it to the disciples of Emmaus that they recognize him.

=== Malachi ===
In the Old Testament, the prophet Malachi exposes God's plans concerning the sacrifices which were offered to him in the temple of Jerusalem and as for the offerings which offered to him in the future: "Oh that there were one among you that would shut the doors, that ye might not kindle fire on mine altar in vain! I have no pleasure in you, saith Jehovah of hosts, neither will I accept an offering at your hand. For from the rising of the sun even unto the going down of the same my name shall be great among the Gentiles; and in every place incense shall be offered unto my name, and a pure offering: for my name shall be great among the Gentiles, saith Jehovah of hosts." According to Irenaeus, God, "by these words, he shows in the plainest manner that the former people [the Jews] shall cease to make offering to God, but that in every place sacrifices shall be offered to God, one that is pure, and that God's name is glorified among nations." Malachi prophesied the celebration of the Lord's Supper, all over the world, as a sacrificial meal, in place of the vegetable offerings and thanksgiving sacrifices that were offered in the Temple.

== New Testament accounts ==
=== Institution narratives ===
In the New Testament there are four accounts of the institution of the Eucharist, the earliest by St Paul in his first letter to the Corinthians which links it back to the Last Supper and three in the Synoptic Gospels in the context of that same meal.

Paul and the Synoptic Gospels in parallel columns
1 Corinthians 11:23–26	Mark 14:22–25	Matthew 26:26–29	Luke 22:14–20
In verses 17–22 Paul criticizes abuses of the Lord's Supper prevalent in Corinth, he continues: "For I received from the Lord what I also handed on to you, that the Lord Jesus on the night when he was betrayed took a loaf of bread, and when he had given thanks, he broke it and said, 'This is my body that is broken for you. Do this in remembrance of me.' In the same way he took the cup also, after supper, saying, 'This cup is the new covenant in my blood. Do this, as often as you drink it, in remembrance of me.' For as often as you eat this bread and drink the cup, you proclaim the Lord's death until he comes."	In the preceding verses the author makes it clear that the setting is a Passover meal. "While they were eating, he took a loaf of bread, and after blessing it he broke it, gave it to them, and said, 'Take; this is my body.' Then he took a cup, and after giving thanks he gave it to them, and all of them drank from it. He said to them, 'This is my blood of the covenant, which is poured out for many. Truly I tell you, I will never again drink of the fruit of the vine until that day when I drink it new in the kingdom of God.'"	In the preceding verses the author makes it clear that the setting is a Passover meal. "While they were eating, Jesus took a loaf of bread, and after blessing it he broke it, gave it to the disciples, and said, 'Take, eat; this is my body.' Then he took a cup, and after giving thanks he gave it to them, saying, 'Drink from it, all of you; for this is my blood of the covenant, which is poured out for many for the forgiveness of sins. I tell you, I will never again drink of this fruit of the vine until that day when I drink it new with you in my Father's kingdom.'"	In the preceding verses the author makes it clear that the setting is a Passover meal. "When the hour came, he took his place at the table, and the apostles with him. He said to them, 'I have eagerly desired to eat this Passover with you before I suffer; for I tell you, I will not eat it until it is fulfilled in the kingdom of God.' Then he took a cup, and after giving thanks he said, 'Take this and divide it among yourselves; for I tell you that from now on I will not drink of the fruit of the vine until the kingdom of God comes.' Then he took a loaf of bread, and when he had given thanks, he broke it and gave it to them, saying, 'This is my body, which is given for you. Do this in remembrance of me.' And he did the same with the cup after supper, saying, 'This cup that is poured out for you is the new covenant in my blood.[']"

Matthew likely follows the account found in the Gospel of Mark. (Note: The question of which gospel came first, whether each gospel drew from the others, and if so how strongly, is known as the synoptic problem, and is a matter of contention for scholars. While no conclusive solution has been found yet, the longstanding majority view favors Marcan priority, in which the Gospel of Mark was written first, and served in at least some capacity as a source for the other synoptic gospels. Most scholars since the late 19th century have accepted the concept of Marcan priority, although a number of scholars support different forms of Marcan priority or reject it altogether. It forms the foundation for the widely accepted two-source theory.) Luke's version differs at so many points from the Markan that some scholars believe it stems from another source. John, which does not include an "Institution Narrative", includes an account of a supper on the night Jesus was betrayed, including a foot washing scene. Chapters 13–17 of the Gospel of John attribute to Jesus a series of teachings and prayers at his Last Supper, but does not mention any meal rituals. On the other hand, John 6, in particular verses such as 55–56 ("For my flesh is food indeed, and my blood is drink indeed. He who eats my flesh and drinks my blood abides in me, and I in him"), is widely interpreted as an allusion to the Eucharist. Perkins identifies reflections of the liturgical tradition of the Johannine community in the passage, though a growing number of scholars have challenged the idea of a Johannine community and cite the lack of evidence for such a community, and there is no consensus among scholars today. A passage found in Luke records a command, found also in Paul, to his disciples, to "do this as my memorial" without specifying whether it should be performed annually, like the Passover, or more frequently.

The text of the Lucan version is uncertain. A number of commentators conclude that the second half of 22:19 and all of 22:20 are later interpolations. In 1926 E.C. Ratcliff declared: "The textus receptus indeed includes the command, but the passage in which it occurs is an interpolation of the Pauline account; and whatever view be taken of the Lucan text, the command is no part of the original". However, C.P.M. Jones, writing in 1978, comments "Many scholars [...] have returned to the support of the longer text", and the same position was taken by the majority of editors of the United Bible Societies Greek New Testament. The attribution to Jesus of the words "This do in memory of Me" is therefore possible, but not certain. Jeremias says "Do this in remembrance of me" would better be translated "That God may remember me", but Richardson objects that the "presence of one particular meaning must not be taken to exclude other shades of meaning, nuances and overtones".

=== Acts, Corinthians and Jude ===
The New Testament recounts a number of practices of religious table fellowship that would later be considered Eucharistic. Paul the Apostle responded to abuses at a meal that the Corinthian Christians had at their meetings and that he did not deem worthy to be called "a Supper of the Lord" (κυριακὸν δεῖπνον, instead of τὸ κυριακὸν δεῖπνον, and so, in this context, "the Lord's supper" means "a supper of the Lord" rather than "the supper of the Lord"). He appeals to them to celebrate it worthily, since otherwise they would be answerable for the body and blood of the Lord, and elsewhere in the same letter, writes: "You cannot drink the cup of the Lord and the cup of demons. You cannot partake of the table of the Lord and the table of demons."

Paul had first evangelized the inhabitants of Corinth, in Greece, in 51/52 AD. Paul's nascent congregation there was made up of pagan, not Jewish, converts (1 Corinthians 12:2). All first-generation Christians were necessarily converts, either pagan or Jewish. They had written him regarding numerous matters of concern (1 Corinthians 7:1). Criticizing what he had heard of their meetings, at which they had communal meals, one paragraph in Paul's response reminded them about what he asserted he had "received from the Lord" and had "passed on" about Jesus' actions and directives at his Last Supper. The ambiguities some find in that wording has generated reams of books, articles and opinions about the Origins of Eucharist.

In his 1994 book, A Feast of Meanings: Eucharistic Theologies from Jesus through Johannine Circles, Bruce Chilton wrote that Paul "indeed 'received from the Lord' (1 Corinthians 11:23), through Cephas (Galatians 1:18), what he 'handed over' (1 Corinthians 11:23) to his hearers. [...] He reminds his hearers of what he already had taught as authoritative, a teaching 'from the Lord' and presumably warranted by the earliest 'pillars': in that sense, what he hands on is not his own, but derives from his highest authority, 'the Lord' (11:23)." Eugene LaVerdiere wrote: "That is how Paul introduced the tradition, presenting himself as a link in the chain of Eucharistic tradition. He received (paralambano) the tradition of Eucharist in the early 40s while in the community at Antioch. He handed it on (paradidomi) to the Corinthians in the year 51 when first proclaiming the gospel to them. Like Paul, the Corinthians also were to become a link in the chain of Eucharistic tradition, handing on to others what Paul handed on to them. Several years later, circa 54, Paul reminded them of this in 1 Corinthians."

There are three references in Acts to "the breaking of bread" by early Christians at Jerusalem and by St Paul on his visit to Troas. The letters of Paul and the Acts of the Apostles make it clear that early Christianity believed that this institution included a mandate to continue the celebration as an anticipation in this life of the joys of the banquet that was to come in the Kingdom of God. The term "Agape" or "Love-feast" appears in the Jude 12: "These are blemishes on your love feasts, as they boldly carouse together, looking after themselves".

== Early Christianity ==
In the three hundred years after Jesus' crucifixion, Christian practices and beliefs regarding the Eucharist took definitive shape as central to Christian worship. At first, they spread through word of mouth, but within a generation Christians had begun writing about Jesus and about Christian practice, the Eucharist included. The theology of the Eucharist and its role as a sacrament developed during this period.

Basing himself on the First Apology and the Dialogue with Trypho of Justin Martyr writing around 150 AD, K.W. Noakes deduces the following liturgical structure was in use at that time:

1. Scripture Readings and Homily
2. Intercessions and Kiss-of-Peace
3. Bread and Cup are brought to the Celebrant
4. Eucharistic Prayer (flexible) but following a fixed pattern with congregational "Amen"
5. Distribution of the elements by the deacons to those present and absent
6. Collection

This corresponds in general outline to the structure of the rite as used today and is the earliest known example. The theology is as follows: the bread and wine are transformed into the Flesh and Blood of Jesus; they are the pure sacrifice spoken of by Malachi (1:11) and the Eucharistic prayer itself is both a thanksgiving for creation and redemption and an anamnesis (Greek for 'memorial') of the passion (and possibly the incarnation).

Information from the intervening period is scant. Both the author of 1 Clement (about 96 AD) and Ignatius of Antioch (about 108 AD) are concerned that due order be maintained; "Give heed to keep one Eucharist. For there is one flesh of our Lord Jesus Christ, and one cup unto union with His blood. There is one altar, as there is one bishop, together with the presbytery and deacons, my fellow-servants; that whatsoever you do, you may do according unto God" (Letter to the Philadelphians, 4). The dating of the Didache is contentious, dates from the middle of the first century to the early second century have been suggested, but it may well be from the same period as 1 Clement and Ignatius. It states that the unbaptized left the assembly before the Eucharist proper began "Let none eat or drink of your Eucharist but such as have been baptized into the name of the Lord, for of a truth the Lord hath said concerning this, Give not that which is holy unto dogs." A composite of several documents, it includes ritual prayers and a mention of what it calls the εὐχαριστία (Thanksgiving or Eucharist). According to the overwhelming consensus among scholars, the section beginning at 10.1 is a reworking of the Birkat hamazon, the prayer that ends the Jewish ritual meal. There is also one possible pagan reference to an early morning celebration from about the year 112 in a letter of the younger Pliny to the emperor Trajan.

Evidence from a slightly later period comes from Irenaeus and from the Apostolic Tradition. In his debate with gnostics who favored an immaterial religion, the former affirms: "Whenever, then, the mixed cup and the bread that has been made receive the word of God, the Eucharist becomes the body of Christ, and by it the substance of our flesh is nourished and sustained". The Apostolic Tradition poses a number of critical problems including the question as to whether the liturgies were ever used. However, the editors of The Study of Liturgy conclude that "it is clearly safe [...] to use the document as evidence for early third-century Rome". It contain what must be considered a complete prayer of consecration including a version of the Institution narrative.

It is clear from the New Testament evidence that some primitive Christian ceremonies involved a full meal and the word "agape" (love-feast) is used. At some point these died out possibly as a result of increasing numbers and possibly due to abuses. Writing shortly after Justin, Tertullian describes "love feasts". Clement of Alexandria (c. 150–211/216) distinguished so-called "Agape" meals of luxurious character from the agape (love) "which the food that comes from Christ shows that we ought to partake of". Accusations of gross indecency were sometimes made against the form that these meals sometimes took. Clement of Alexandria also mentions abuses (Stromata III,29) and the editor comments: "The early disappearance of the Christian agapæ may probably be attributed to the terrible abuse of the word here referred to, by the licentious Carpocratians".

Augustine of Hippo also objected to the continuance in his native North Africa of the custom of such meals, in which some indulged to the point of drunkenness, and he distinguished them from proper celebration of the Eucharist: "Let us take the body of Christ in communion with those with whom we are forbidden to eat even the bread which sustains our bodies." He reports that even before the time of his stay in Milan, the custom had already been forbidden there. Canons 27 and 28 of the Council of Laodicea (364) restricted the abuses.

=== Early liturgies ===
The Didache gives in chapter 9 prayers for use in celebrating what it calls the Eucharist, involving a cup and broken bread, and in chapter 10 another prayer for use "after you are filled". Scholars disagree on whether these texts concern a Eucharist in the proper sense.

Between 150 and 155 AD, Justin Martyr describes the liturgy of his day in chapters 65 and 66 of his First Apology. The liturgy describes thanksgivings before the Anaphora. The consecration of the Eucharistic species is done with the words of 1 Corinthians 11: "For the apostles, in the memoirs composed by them, which are called Gospels, have thus delivered unto us what was enjoined upon them; that Jesus took bread, and when He had given thanks, said, 'This do ye in remembrance of Me, this is My body;' and that, after the same manner, having taken the cup and given thanks, He said, 'This is My blood;' and gave it to them alone."

No full liturgies are known before the 3rd century. The earliest extant texts of an anaphora (the central part of the Eucharistic liturgy, known also as the Eucharistic Prayer) include the Anaphora of Addai and Mari, the Anaphora of the Apostolic Tradition and the Egyptian form of the Liturgy of Saint Basil. The earliest text that is similar to the Roman Canon is that quoted in De Sacramentis of Ambrose (see History of the Roman Canon).

== Contemporary scholars and evolution of the Eucharist ==
The gap of some twenty years between the date of the Last Supper and the writing of 1 Corinthians, and the even longer period before the Gospels were written, have led to doubts as to their historical reliability and the suggestion that they reflect the concerns and situation of the early Christians at the time of writing rather than reporting objectively events which occurred decades before. However, more recently, according to John P. Meier and E. P. Sanders, Jesus having a final meal with his disciples is almost beyond dispute among scholars, and belongs to the framework of the narrative of Jesus' life. They therefore try to decide where the distinct components of the later rite originated by examining possible cultural elements, both Jewish and Hellenic, which already existed in the period under study. The underlying debate is over the relative contributions of Paul and Jesus and the possible intervention of other factors. One key consideration in this is the problem of the Jewish prohibition of drinking blood.

Professor Robert J. Daly, S.J., argues that Jesus did indeed institute the Eucharist, though it took generations and centuries of guidance from the Holy Spirit for the Eucharist to reach its current form. "What Jesus did at the Last Supper is obviously at least the generative moment of the institution of the Eucharist." However, he states that it was not the Eucharist as is known today. "The Eucharist that Christians now celebrate is what the Church, under the guidance of the Holy Spirit of the risen Jesus, and over the course of generations and centuries, learned to do as it celebrated table fellowship with its risen Lord."

On the other hand, Bruce Chilton suggests that six different ways of celebrating what Christians came to call the Eucharist can be found in the New Testament, and can locate each of these in its own specific socio-religio-political setting. This would seem to make irrelevant a number of time-honored scholarly approaches, fundamental to which were, first, the "literally true" vs. "literary fictions" debate, and, second, the assumption that there was a unified line of development from the established Eucharist of later centuries back close to the time of the historical Jesus.

The six Eucharists in the New Testament, according to Bruce Chilton
Jesus' Table Fellowship	The "Last Supper"	Petrine Christianity	The Circle of James	Paul and the Synoptics	John
Jesus joined with his followers in meals that were designed to anticipate the coming of God's kingdom. The meals were characterized by a readiness to accept the hospitality and the produce of Israel at large. A willingness to provide for the meals, to join in the fellowship, to forgive and to be forgiven, was seen by Jesus as a sufficient condition for eating in his company and for entry into the kingdom. Jesus' approach to purity qualification was distinctive in its inclusiveness. For Jesus, the primary markers of purity, the primary requirements for table fellowship in the kingdom were: Israel as forgiven and willing to provide of its own produce.	Jesus sought to influence or reform purity practices associated with the Temple. In his meals, as he shared wine, he started referring to it as the equivalent of the blood of an animal shed in sacrifice, and in sharing bread, claiming that its value was that of sacrificial flesh. "Here was a sacrifice of sharings which the authorities could not control, and which the nature of Jesus' movement made it impossible for them to ignore. Jesus' meals after his failed occupation of the Temple became a surrogate of sacrifice, the second type of Eucharist."	In this stage of Eucharistic development, the berakhah prayer of Judaism seems to have become a principal model of Eucharist. Bread took precedence over wine, and, as Acts 1:12–26, 2:46, and 3:14–37 clearly describe, a double domestication took place. Instead of seeking the hospitality of others, as the itinerant Jesus seemed to do, adherents of the movement, under the leadership of Peter and/or the Twelve, gathered in the homes of colleagues where they "broke bread at home and ate their food with glad and generous hearts, praising God and having the goodwill of all the people" (Acts 2:46–47). In addition, apparently they also acknowledged the validity of sacrifice in the Temple. In doing this they changed the nature of the meal and the memory of what Jesus had said at that meal. For example, there is no mention of wine, nor does there, in this account of the earliest Christian gatherings, seem to have been any sense of being in tension with the officials of Judaism or its religious practices.	The tendency to domestication is here pursued further, for the Eucharist is now seen as a Seder meal, open only to Jews in a state of purity, and to be celebrated only once a year, at Passover, in Jerusalem, as prescribed in Exodus 12:48. The effect of this Jacobean program—a possible antecedent to the later Quartodeciman practice—"was to integrate Jesus' movement fully within the liturgical institutions of Judaism, to insist upon the Judaic identity of the movement and upon Jerusalem as its governing center," but without actually replacing Israel's Seder.	Paul vehemently resisted Jacobean claims. He also emphasized the link between Jesus' death and the Eucharist, and he accepts what Chilton calls the Hellenistic refinement of the Petrine type that presented the Eucharist as a sacrifice for sin. This is also what we find in the Synoptic Gospels which use words to suggest that Jesus' blood is shed in the interests of the communities for which those Gospels were composed: for the "many" (possibly in Damascus) Matthew 26:28 and (possibly in Rome) Mark 14:24: on behalf of "you" (possibly in Antioch) Luke 22:20.	Jesus identifies himself in John 6 as the manna, now developed to construe the Eucharist as a mystery in which Jesus, not literally but sacramentally, offers/gives his own personal body and blood in Eucharist. This would probably not be a totally new idea to Hellenistic Christians who followed synoptic practice. But Johannine practice now makes this meaning explicit. It was, as is characteristic of the Fourth Gospel, an unambiguous, clear break with Judaism. For with this development, Eucharist has become a "sacrament" understandable only in Hellenistic terms, and involving "a knowing conflict with the ordinary understanding of what Judaism might and might not include."

=== Eucharist and its relation to the Last Supper ===
Paul F. Bradshaw argues in Eucharistic Origins that it is not until after the 1st century and much later in some areas that the Eucharist and the Last Supper became placed in a relation of dependence: many Eucharists did not relate to the Paschal mystery and/or the Last Supper. On the other hand, in the middle of the 1st century Paul the Apostle explicitly placed the celebration of the Lord's Supper in relation to what Jesus did on the night he was handed over, in giving his disciples bread with the words "This is my body" and, after the supper, giving them the cup with a similar declaration about his blood.

John Dominic Crossan suggests that there are two traditions "as old as we can trace them" of the eucharist, that of Paul, reflecting the Antioch Church's tradition, and that of the Didache, the first document to give explicit instruction regarding prayers to be said at a celebration that it called the Eucharist.

The cup/bread liturgy of the Didache, from the Jerusalem tradition, does not mention Passover, or Last Supper, or Death of Jesus/blood/body, and the sequence is meal + thanksgiving ritual. For Crossan, it is dispositive that

even late in the first century C.E., at least some (southern?) Syrian Christians could celebrate a Eucharist of bread and wine with absolutely no hint of Passover meal, Last Supper or passion symbolism built into its origins or development. I cannot believe that they knew about those elements and studiously avoided them. I can only presume that they were not there for everyone from the beginning, that is, from solemn formal and final institution by Jesus himself.

Paul's first letter to the Corinthians, in the context of correcting the habits of the Corinthians serves to reestablish "the Pre-Pauline tradition, ritual of bread/body + meal + ritual of cup/blood." Hellenized Jew Paul references a Greek weekly Lord's Supper, which is not an annual Jewish Passover meal, and does not have the participants giving thanks ("Eucharistia"), rather the purpose is to proclaim Jesus' death until he comes again, in the manner of Hellenic societies formed "to hold meals in remembrance of those who had died and to drink a cup in honor of some god." Some authors would consider Paul to be the "Founder" of the Eucharist in a pagan context appealing to the Jewish prohibition against drinking blood, the pervasive history of Greek memorial dining societies, and Paul's own hellenistic background." Paul, however, explicitly stated that he was rehearsing a Christian tradition, something that he himself had "received" and had already "handed on" to the Corinthians. Paul's references in this letter to unleavened bread, Christ as the "paschal lamb," and mention of the "cup of blessing," similar to the ancient Mishnah Pesahim instructions on celebrating the Passover meal, suggest Jewish influence (see 1 Corinthians 5:7; 10:16; 11:23).

Both sequences underline the primary importance of the Shared Meal to historical 1st century Christian ritual. Crossan maintains that table fellowship was central to Jesus' ministry in that was infamous for violating codes of honor to eat freely with outsiders, termed "sinners and tax collectors" in the Gospels. Jesus presumably taught at the table, as was customary. This emphasis on table fellowship is reflected in the large number of eating scenes in early Christian art. In the Jerusalem tradition, of James and Peter, the meal is of higher importance than blood and body since the Didache fails to mention them. Both traditions reflect the pitfalls of a shared meal among social unequals, namely freeloading. The Didache says in 12:3–4, "If (a traveler) wants to settle with you and is an artisan, he must work for his living. If, however, he has no trade, use your judgment in taking steps for him to live with you as a Christian without being idle." Paul, in 2 Thessalonians 3:10 says: "If anyone is not willing to work, let him not eat." In Crossan's view, "both stipulations must presume a communal share-meal or they make no sense."

==== Crossan's Preliminary Stages ====
Five Preliminary stages to "2000 years of eucharistic theology" and "Last Supper iconography", according to Crossan
1. Graeco-Roman formal meal	2. Jesus' practice	3a. Didache 10	3b. Didache 9	4. 1 Corinthians	5. Mark
deipnon (supper, main meal), then symposion	a meal that later and in retrospect was recognized as having been their last one together	Give thanks, no reference to Passover, Last Supper, or Death of Jesus	Eucharist, no reference to Passover, Last Supper, or Death of Jesus	Lord's Supper	Passover Meal
Bread course followed by ritual libation followed by wine course	Open Commensality – radical social egalitarianism in seating for meal	Common Meal followed by Thanks to the Father, no ritual with bread or cup	Common meal, ritual with Cup (thanks for the Holy Vine of David) and Bread (thanks for the life and knowledge of Jesus)	Bread/body, Thanks, Common Meal, Cup/blood	During meal, first Bread/body, then Cup/blood and Thanks
	No ritual	No mention of the death of Jesus	No mention of the death of Jesus	Passion Remembrance in both cup and bread	No command for repetition and remembrance

=== Problem of the historical Jewish prohibition against blood-drinking ===
In a 2002 analysis in the Biblical Theology Bulletin, Michael J. Cahill surveyed the state of scholarly literature from some seventy cited sources, dating from the 1950s to the present, on the question of the likelihood of a Jewish Jesus proposing the drinking of blood in the Eucharist. After examining the various theories that have been suggested, he concludes:

The survey of opinion, old and new, reveals wide disagreement with a fundamental divide between those who can accept that the notion of drinking blood could have a Jewish origin and those who insist that this is a later development to be located in the Hellenistic world. What both sides share is an inability to proffer a rationally convincing argument that can provide a historical explanation for the presence of this particular component of the Eucharistic rite. Those who hold for the literal institution by Jesus have not been able to explain plausibly how the drinking of blood could have arisen in a Jewish setting. In fact, this difficulty has been turned into an argument for authenticity. For example, Jeremiah [sic] quotes Dalman: "Exactly that which seems scandalous will be historical" (170–71). W. D. Davies draws attention to the fact that Dalman also argued that the Pauline version of the institution arose in a gentile environment to eliminate the difficulties presented by the more direct Markan form (246). It would appear to be obvious that the difficulties would have been greater in a Jewish environment. Davies' conclusion is apt: "When such divergent conclusons [sic] have been based upon the same evidence any dogmatism would be foolish" (246). On the other hand, I have earlier argued that previous suggestions supporting the non-Jewish source have been vitiated by vague generalities or by association with inappropriate pagan rituals.

In the account of the Last Supper in Luke chapter 22, the wine that is consumed at the passover meal is shown to not be literally blood, but represents the blood that Jesus will shed by his death on the cross. It was a deliberate act of tying the Passover story from the Book of Exodus to the Crucifixion, and the shed blood of the passover lamb being painted on the lintels of the Hebrews' doors, to Jesus "...the Lamb of God, who takes away the sin of the world!" and his sacrifice at the time of passover.

'And he took bread, gave thanks and broke it, and gave it to them, saying, “This is my body given for you; do this in remembrance of me.” In the same way, after the supper he took the cup, saying, “This cup is the new covenant in my blood, which is poured out for you."' (Luke 22:19-20)

== Possible cultural influences ==
=== Jewish ritual meal practice ===
Scholars have associated Jesus' Last Supper and the 1st-century Eucharist practices with three Second Temple Jewish meal practices: the kiddush blessing with wine, and the chaburah fellowship and the Passover Seder meal.

==== Kiddush ====
The Johannine Supper, Ratcliff has suggested, was the Jewish ordinance known as Kiddush, the details of which involved the leader of the mixed-sex ceremony taking a cup of wine, sanctifying it by reciting a thanksgiving blessing, and passing it around. There was a similar blessing and breaking of bread. Kiddush is the "Jewish benediction and prayer recited over a cup of wine immediately before the meal on the eve of the sabbath or of a festival. After reciting the kiddush the master of the house sips from the cup, and then passes it to his wife and to the others at the table; then all wash their hands, and the master of the house blesses the bread, cuts it, and passes a morsel to each person at the table.

Ratcliff wrote: "Though the kiddush accounts for the '[Johannine]' Last Supper, it affords no explanation on the origin of the eucharist ... the Last Supper and the Sabbath-Passover Kiddush was therefore no unusual occurrence. It represented consistent practice since Jesus had first formed the group. It is from this practice, rather than from any direct institution from Jesus, that the eucharist derives its origin. The practice was too firmly established for the group to abandon it, when its Master had been taken away; the primitive apostolic eucharist is no other than the continuation of Jesus's chaburah meal. This is the 'breaking of bread' of Acts ii. 42."

Joachim Jeremias disputed the view that the Last Supper was kiddush, because the Kiddush was always associated with the Sabbath, and even if there was a Passover kiddush, it would have taken place immediately before the seder, not the day before.

==== Chaburah ====
The chaburah (also 'haburah', pl 'chaburoth') is not the name of a rite, rather it was the name of a group of male friends who met at regular intervals (weekly for Dix) for conversation and a formal meal appurtenant to that meeting. Nothing is said about them in the Bible but scholars have been able to discover some things about them from other sources. The corporate meeting of a chaburah usually took the form of a supper, held at regular intervals, often on the eve of sabbaths or holy days. Each member of the society contributed towards the provision of this common meal.

The form of the supper was largely the same as the chief meal of the day in every pious Jewish household. Each kind of food was blessed when it was first brought to the table. At the end of the meal came the grace after meals – the Blessing or Benediction as it was called. This long prayer was said by the host or father of the family in the name of all who had eaten the meal. On important occasions, and at a chaburah supper, it was recited over a special cup of wine known quite naturally as "the cup of blessing." At the end of the Thanksgiving prayer this cup was sipped by the leader and then by each of those present. The chaburah supper was concluded by the singing of a psalm, after which the meeting broke up.

Jeremias also disputed that the Last Supper was a chaburah meal, interposing the objection that the chaburah was a "duty" meal, held appurtenant to a formal occasion such as a 'bris' or a betrothal.

==== Passover Seder ====
Passover commemorates God's saving of his chosen people, the Israelites, who, according to Exodus 12:1–29, were spared death through the blood of lambs. The Passover Seder involves four cups of wine.

Whether the Last Supper was a Passover Meal (as the chronology of the Synoptic Gospels would suggest) or not (as St John), it is clear that the Eucharist was instituted at Passover time, and Christian writers from Saint Paul (1 Corinthians 5:7) onwards have stressed that the death of Christ was the fulfilment of the sacrifice foreshadowed by the Passover."

Enrico Mazza has argued that the view that the Last Supper was a Passover meal "remains a theological interpretation. The historical fact is that the Last Supper was not a Passover celebration and, consequently, that its liturgy was not that of the Jewish Passover."

Joachim Jeremias, having rejected the previous two possible backgrounds for the Last Supper argues forcibly that it was a Passover Seder while recognising that there are difficulties. His case may be summed as follows.

Was the Last Supper a Passover Seder? according to Joachim Jeremias
Ten factors substantiating Passover	Nine factors in objection to Passover actions that would be in violation of ritual regulations	Two further objections
The Last Supper took place in Jerusalem; it extended into the night; it was a small gathering; they reclined instead of sitting at table; a dish preceded the breaking of bread; red wine was drunk; when Judas went out, the disciples thought he was going to distribute money to the poor, a Passover custom; the meal closed with a hymn – the Paschal Hallel; the interpretative words spoken over the bread and wine look like an extension of the Passover Haggadah; and the fact that, Jesus did not go to Bethany for the night, but stayed within the area of Greater Jerusalem and made His way to Gethsemane -	the walk to Gethsemane; the carrying of arms; the night session of the Sanhedrin and the condemnation; the rending of the High Priest's garments; the participation of the Jews in the Roman trial; the coming of Simon of Cyrene from the country; the execution itself; the purchase of linen; the preparation of spices and the burial	The absence of any reference to the lamb in the accounts of the Supper.; The problem of how the annual Passover of the Jews changed into the weekly Eucharist [Holy Communion] of the Christians

=== Greek and other ritual meal practice ===
The spread of Christianity outside the Jewish communities has led some scholars to investigate whether Hellenistic practices influenced the development of Eucharistic rites, especially in view of the Jewish prohibition of drinking blood (see above).

==== Deipnon, libation and symposion ====
During the Second Temple period, Hellenic practices were adopted by Jews after the conquests of Alexander the Great. By the 2nd century BC, Jesus Ben Sirach described Jewish feasting, with numerous parallels to Hellenic practice, without disapproval. Gentile and Jewish practice was that the all-male participants reclined at table on their left elbows, and after a benediction given by the host (in the case of a Jewish meal), would have a deipnon (late afternoon or evening meal) of bread with various vegetables, perhaps some fish or even meat if the meal was extravagant.

Among the Greeks, a ritual libation, or sacrificial pouring out of wine, followed, with another benediction or blessing, leading to the 'symposion' (as in Plato's Symposium) or wine-drinking course and entertainment. Thus was established an order of breaking bread and drinking wine. Cups of wine were even passed from diner to diner as a way to pass responsibility for speaking next. "Plutarch spoke in the highest terms of the bonds created by the shared wine bowl. His words are echoed by Paul who spoke of the sharing of bread and wine as the act that created the one body, that is to say, it was a community-creating ritual."

Dennis E. Smith says that the earliest Christians worshiped at table in their hosts' dining rooms. and that the earliest Christians shaped the traditions about Jesus to fit that setting. In his study Dining Posture in Ancient Rome: Bodies, Values, and Status concerning practice at the meals designated in Latin by the word "convivium", equivalent to "deipnon" and/or "symposion" in Greek, The number of participants at such meals in private houses, as opposed to other specially designated places, would be at most a dozen. The symposium after the meal was the time for teaching and conversation, for the singing of hymns, for the contributions of those who prophesied or spoke in tongues.

==== Mystery cults ====
Parallel to the religious duties to god and state, "the Hellenic world also fostered a number of 'underground' religions, which countless thousands of people found intellectually and emotionally satisfying." They were known as the "mysteries," because their adherents took oaths never to reveal their rites to the uninitiated. Several honored young male gods born of a divine father and human mother, resurrected after a heroic death. In some of these secret religions "celebrants shared a communal meal in which they symbolically ate the flesh and drank the blood of their god."

==== Dionysus cult ====
Early Christianity spread through a Hellenized populace. Jewish feast practices had taken on Hellenic forms as noted above. Dionysus was "god of 'the vine' - representing wine, the most universally popular beverage in the ancient world." Barry Powell suggests that Christian notions of eating and drinking the "flesh" and "blood" of Jesus were influenced by the cult of Dionysus. In contrast, the ancient Greek tragedy, The Bacchae, a ritual involving the wine of Dionysus is not drunk, but poured out as a libation. In the Greek novel, Leucippe and Clitophon by Achilles Tatius, Dionysus is said to have given a shepherd of Tyre his first wine. When Dionysus shows the grape cluster where he got the wine from, Tatius parodies the Christian eucharist rite.

==== Totem-sacrifices ====
In the chapter "Totem-Sacrifices and Eucharists" of his 1920 book Pagan and Christian Creeds, Edward Carpenter advanced the theory that the Christian Eucharist arose from an almost universal practice of a tribe occasionally eating the animal that it identified with, a practice that he saw as developing into ceremonial eatings of shared food by lamas in Nepal and Tibet, ancient Egyptians, Aztecs, Peruvians, Chinese and Tartars. He concluded: "These few instances are sufficient to show the extraordinarily wide diffusion of Totem-sacraments and Eucharistic rites all over the world."

=== Pre-Pauline confluence of Greek and Jewish traditions and agapē ===
By the time of the Roman conquest, Jews practiced festive dining in essentially the same form as the Greeks, with a dinner (deipnon) followed by the symposium proper, where guests drank wine and enjoyed entertainment or conversation. There were, to be sure, cultic differences, such as a berakhah over the wine cup instead of the Greeks' libation to Dionysus. But eating together was a central activity for Jewish religious groups such as Pharisees and Essenes.

"Thanksgiving" (in Greek, "εὐχαριστία" [eucharistia]) is probably to be regarded as the Greek equivalent of the Hebrew "ברכה" [berakhah, berakah], the Jewish "blessing" (in Greek, "εὐλογία" [eulogia]) "addressed to God at meals for and over the food and drink. It is in this sense that the term was originally used in connection with the common meal of the early Christian community, at which the 'blessing' or 'thanksgiving' had special reference to Jesus Christ."

One formulation had it that "(t)he eucharistia was the berakhah without the chaburah supper, and the agape is the chaburah meal without the berakhah.

Agape feast

The Eucharistic celebrations of the early Christians were embedded in, or simply took the form of, a meal. These were often called agape feasts, although terminology varied in the first few centuries along with other aspects of practice. Agape is one of the Greek words for love, and so "agape feasts" are also referred to in English as "love-feasts".

This Hellenic ritual was apparently a full meal, with each participant bringing a contribution to the meal according to their means. Perhaps predictably enough, it could at times deteriorate into merely an occasion for eating and drinking, or for ostentatious displays by the wealthier members of the community of the type criticised by Paul in 1 Corinthians 11:20–22.
