= Anaphora of the Apostolic Tradition =

Part of ancient Christian liturgy

The Anaphora of the Apostolic Tradition, also known as the Anaphora of Hippolytus, is an ancient Christian Anaphora (also known as a Eucharistic Prayer) which is found in chapter four of the Apostolic Tradition. It should not be confused with the Syriac Orthodox Anaphora of the Twelve Apostles, which is similar, and may be one of several liturgies derived from this Anaphora, yet is considerably longer and more ornate.

It was used extensively by Gregory Dix in his research for his book The Shape of the Liturgy published in 1945 and subsequently by theologians such as Dr. Charles (Ted) Hackett and Dr. Don Saliers among others in preparing reforms for the Book of Common Prayer and the United Methodist Liturgies found in the current United Methodist Hymnal. This anaphora is also the inspiration for the Roman Rite's Eucharistic Prayer II in the Mass of Paul VI.

== Date and origin ==
The dating of this anaphora is strictly related to the attribution of the Apostolic Tradition which includes it. In 1906 Eduard von der Goltz was the first to suggest that the anonymous manuscript discovered in the 19th century was the Apostolic Tradition historically attributed to Hippolytus of Rome, thus dating the anaphora to the mid 3rd century AD and using it in reconstructing the early worship in Rome. This understanding was subsequently accepted by the great majority of scholars of the 20th century, including Gregory Dix, and played a crucial role in the liturgical reforms of main mainstream Christian bodies.

Some scholarship questions the attribution to Hippolytus and the Apostolic Tradition is viewed as a composite work modified over the centuries. According to this view, the anaphora probably attained its final form around the middle of the 4th century and is not related to Rome but to West Syria or even to Egypt. Some scholars also suggest that the Apostolic Tradition portrays a liturgy that was never celebrated. However, in Eastern Orthodox ecclesiology, the attribution to Hippolytus remains generally accepted.

== Contents of the Anaphora ==
This anaphora is minimal compared with the longer and more ornate forms of the Roman Canon, and the Anaphorae of the Divine Liturgy of St. Basil the Great, and the Liturgy of St. James the Just; it is widely believed that these ancient liturgies are themselves either derived from, or closely related to, this liturgy. This liturgy, in its brevity, lacks a Sanctus or Trisagion; additionally, the Epiclesis does not unequivocally affirm a real change of the Eucharistic gifts of bread and wine into the body and blood of Jesus Christ. Finally, the text of the Anaphora assumes it is to be said by a bishop; in the Early Church each congregation was presided over by a bishop, whose duties included the normal celebration of the Eucharist; later, this function in most parishes was delegated to presbyters and special rubrics developed for services celebrated by a bishop, which came to be known in the East as Hierarchical Divine Liturgies, and in the Roman church, as the Pontifical High Mass. In modern liturgies based on this anaphora, such as Eucharistic Prayer II of the Roman Rite Mass, either a priest or a bishop might preside.

=== Sursum Corda ===
The Bishop begins:
The Lord be with you.
And all reply:
And with thy spirit.
The Bishop continues:
Lift up your hearts.
Congregation:
We lift them up unto the Lord.
Bishop:
Let us give thanks to the Lord.
Congregation:
It is right and just.

=== Thanksgiving ===
The Bishop continues:
We give thanks to you God,
through your beloved son Jesus Christ,
whom you sent to us in former times
as Savior, Redeemer, and Messenger of your Will,
who is your inseparable Word,
through whom you made all,
and in whom you were well-pleased,
whom you sent from heaven into the womb of a virgin,
who, being conceived within her, was made flesh,
and appeared as your Son,
born of the Holy Spirit and the virgin.
It is he who, fulfilling your will
and acquiring for you a holy people,
extended his hands in suffering,
in order to liberate from sufferings
those who believe in you.

=== Words of Institution ===
Who, when he was delivered to voluntary suffering,
in order to dissolve death,
and break the chains of the devil,
and tread down hell,
and bring the just to the light,
and set the limit,
and manifest the resurrection,
taking the bread, and giving thanks to you, said,
"Take, eat, for this is my body which is broken for you."
Likewise the chalice, saying,
This is my blood which is shed for you.
Whenever you do this, do this [in] memory of me.

=== Anamnesis and Oblation ===
Therefore, remembering his death and resurrection,
we offer to you the bread and the chalice,
giving thanks to you, who has made us worthy
to stand before you and to serve as your priests.

=== Epiclesis ===
And we pray that you would send your Holy Spirit
to the oblation of your Holy Church.
In their gathering together,
give to all those who partake of your holy mysteries the fullness of the Holy Spirit,
toward the strengthening of the faith in truth,

=== Doxology ===
that we may praise you and glorify you,
through your son Jesus Christ,
through whom to you be glory and honor,
Father and Son,
with the Holy Spirit,
in your Holy Church,
now and always, [Amen].
