= Hallowing of Theodore of Mopsuestia =

Anaphora in the East Syriac Rite

The Hallowing of Theodore of Mopsuestia (Classical Syriac: ܩܘܼܕܵܫܵܐ ܕܡܵܪܝ ܬܸܐܕܘܿܪܘܿܣ ܡܦܲܫܩܲܢܲܐ, romanized: Qúdāšāʾ d-Mār Teʾdoros Mpašqanaʾ, "Hallowing of Saint Theodore the Interpreter") is one of three Eucharistic liturgies used in the East Syriac Rite. It is currently employed by Assyrian Church of the East, Ancient Church of the East, the Syro-Malabar Church and the Chaldean Catholic Church, which are descendants of the erstwhile Church of the East. It is attributed to Theodore of Mopsuestia and is used from Annunciation until the Sunday of the Oshana.

Leontius of Byzantium intimates that Theodore wrote a portion of a liturgy; "not content with drafting a new creed, he sought to impose upon the church a new Anaphora". The proanaphoral and post-communion portions are supplied by the older liturgy of the Apostles, the anaphora only being peculiar. Internal evidence confirms the judgment of Dr. John Mason Neale, who regards it as a genuine work of Theodore.

== See also ==
- Liturgy of Addai and Mari (or Hallowing of the Apostles)
- Hallowing of Nestorius
