= Fermentum =

Christian practice affirming communion

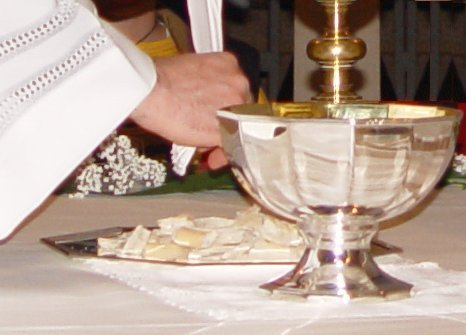

Fermentum is a practice of the Early Christian Church whereby bishops affirmed their communion with one another, or with their own local subordinate priests.

The custom of the fermentum was first practiced as early as 120 AD. A particle of the Eucharistic bread was carried by a minister of the Church from the bishop of one diocese to the bishop of another diocese. The receiving bishop would then consume the species at his next celebration of the Eucharist as a sign of the communion between the churches. The term fermentum was probably a reference to the Eucharist as the leaven of the Christian life, and as the instrument by which Christians spread throughout the world were united in the one Body of Christ as a leaven to the world.

In the 2nd century, popes sent the Eucharist to other bishops as a pledge of unity of faith, this being the origin of the expression to be in communion with each other, and such communion already considered essential to Christianity in the 2nd-century writings of St. Ignatius of Antioch and St. Irenaeus. On occasion, bishops also sent out fermenti to their priests.

John Zizioulas, the Metropolitan of Pergamon, in his 1964 doctoral thesis (at the University of Athens), takes the position that by the mid-3rd century the Bishops were exercising fermentum with the (local to the Metropolitan) parishes that did have a presiding Bishop in order to communicate/retain the unity of the Church under the Bishop. While this was due to the growth of the Christian church, it is also due to extensive persecution of the Church, especially aimed at the Bishops.

Another usage, often termed sancta or also (confused with) fermentum, was to use a previously (locally) consecrated host to signify temporal continuity. At papal masses around 700 AD Klausen states: "Saying the salutation 'Pax Domini sit semper vobiscum' — [the peace of the Lord be always with you] — the Pope immersed the particle which came from the previous day's mass in the chalice and at the same time broke off a piece of bread which he had consecrated, and which was to serve as a fermentum at the next service".

== See also ==
- Holy Leaven
