= Holy Qurbana =

Eucharist in East Syriac Christianity

The Holy Qurbana (Syriac: ܩܘܼܪܒܵܢܵܐ ܩܲܕܝܼܫܵܐ, Qurbānā Qaddišā in Eastern Syriac or Qurbānā Qandišā in the Indian variant of Eastern Syriac, the "Holy Offering" or "Holy Sacrifice" in English), or the Holy Raza, refers to the Eucharistic liturgy as celebrated in Syriac Christianity and the liturgical books containing the rubrics for its celebration. Churches that celebrate this liturgy include various descendants of the Church of the East. East Syriac Christianity consists of an Edessan liturgical rite called the East Syriac Rite (also known as the Edessan Rite, Assyrian Rite, Babylonian Rite, Chaldean Rite or Persian Rite). The major anaphora of the East Syriac tradition is the Holy Qurbana of Saints Addai and Mari; Addai being a disciple of Thomas the Apostle and Mari being Addai's disciple. These churches are primarily based in the Middle East and India, with diasporic communities settled in the western world.

The East Syriac Rite is employed by the Assyrian Church of the East based in Iraq (including its archdiocese the Chaldean Syrian Church of India) and the Ancient Church of the East based in Iraq. Additionally, the rite is employed by the Syro-Malabar Church based in India and the Chaldean Catholic Church based in Iraq, both of which are sui iuris Eastern Catholic Churches.

== Etymology ==
The East Syriac word Qurbana is derived from the Syriac word qurbānā (ܩܘܪܒܢܐ), which, along with its meaning of Eucharist, may also mean offering, sacrifice, or gift. It is from the root Q-R-B, related to approaching. It is a cognate with Hebrew itself a Syriac word קרבן qorbān and Arabic قربان qurbān.

When the Temple stood in Jerusalem, and sacrifices were offered, "qorban" was a technical Hebrew term for some of the offerings that were brought there. It comes from a Hebrew root, "qarab", meaning "to draw close or 'near'". A required korban was offered morning and evening daily and on holidays (at certain times, additional korbanot were offered), in addition to which individuals could bring an optional personal Korban.

The Holy Qurbana is referred to as "complete" worship, since it is performed for the benefit of all members of the Church. The other sacraments are celebrated for individual members. Thus, the Holy Qurbana is believed to be the sacrament that completes all the others. Hence it is called the "sacrament of perfection" or the "queen of sacraments".

== Usage ==
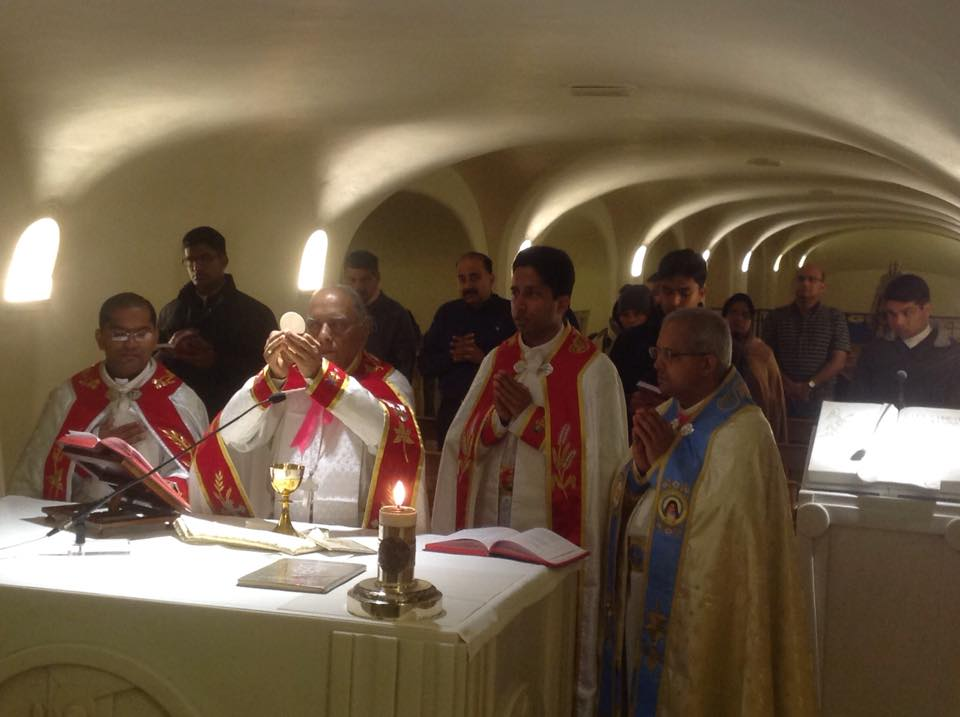
A Bishop of the Syro-Malabar Church celebrates Holy Qurbana at the tomb of St. Peter

The East Syriac or Chaldean rite was associated with the historical Church of the East, centered in the Persian capital of Seleucia-Ctesiphon. Today, the Liturgy of Mar Addai and Mari is used in the Ancient Church of the East, the Assyrian Church of the East, the Chaldean Catholic Church, as well as the Syro-Malabar Church and the Chaldean Syrian Church based in Kerala, India.

=== Edessan Liturgical Rite ===
The Liturgy of Saints Addai and Mari belongs to the Edessan Rite (East Syriac), the anaphora or Eucharistic Prayer that is part of this liturgy, possibly dating back to 3rd-century Edessa, and is the oldest in Christianity. This liturgy is traditionally attributed to Saint Addai (disciple of Saint Thomas the Apostle) and Saint Mari (a disciple of Saint Addai). In the form given in the oldest manuscripts, all of the High Middle Ages, this anaphora does not include the Words of Institution, a matter that raised ecumenical concerns.

== Qudasha of Saints Addai and Mari ==
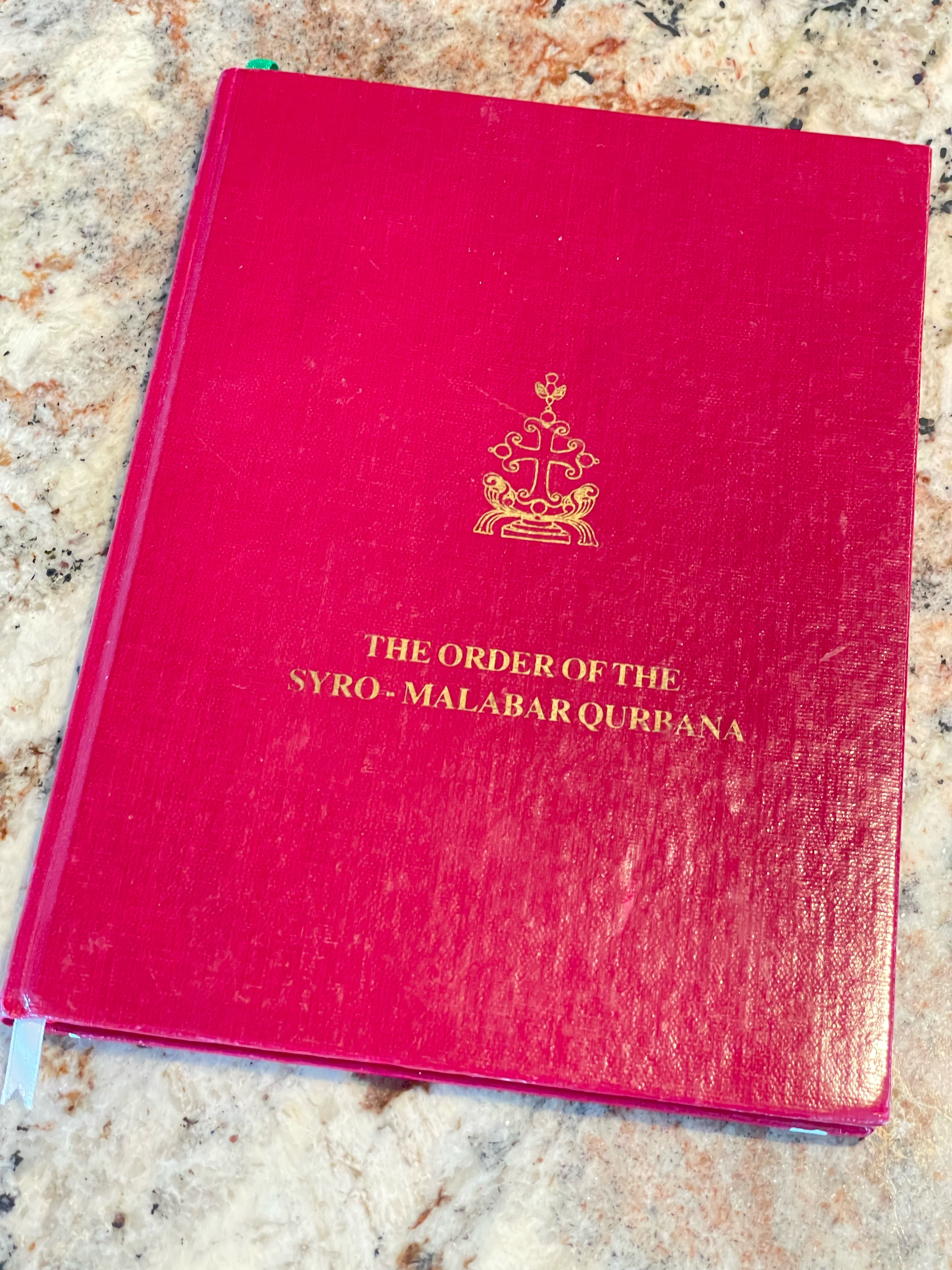
The taksa(text) of the Qurbana according to the Syro-Malabar Catholic Church in English

The Qudasha or Eucharistic Prayer that is part of the East Syriac Rite is of particular interest, being one of the oldest in Christianity, possibly dating back to 3rd-century Edessa, even if the outline of the current form can only be traced as far back as the time of the Patriarch Ishoyahb III in the 7th century. In the form given in the oldest manuscripts, this anaphora does not include the Words of Institution. The Eastern Catholic churches employing this liturgy have the Words of Institution included.

== Other Qudashe ==
=== Qudasha of Mar Theodore ===
The Qudasha of Theodore of Mopsuestia is one of three Eucharistic liturgies used in the East Syriac Rite. It is currently employed by Assyrian Church of the East, Ancient Church of the East, the Syro-Malabar Church and to a lesser extend in the Chaldean Catholic Church, which are descendants of the erstwhile Church of the East. It is attributed to Theodore of Mopsuestia and is considered to be his genuine work. It is used from Advent until the Sunday of the Hossanas.

=== Qudasha of Mar Nestorius ===
The Qudasha of Nestorius is one of the Eucharistic liturgies used by the erstwhile Church of the East. It is currently employed in the Holy Qurbana of the Chaldean Catholic Church, Assyrian Church of the East, Ancient Church of the East, and the Syro-Malabar Church, which are descendants of the Church of the East. It is a part of the East Syriac Rite, formally attributed to Nestorius, Patriarch of Constantinople and is traditionally celebrated for the Feast of the Epiphany, Commemoration of St. John the Baptist, Commemoration of the Greek Teachers: Mar Diodore, Mar Theodore the interpreter and Mar Nestorius, and also for the Wednesday liturgy of the Rogation of the Ninevites, and the Feast of the Passover (Holy Thursday).

== Holy Malka ==
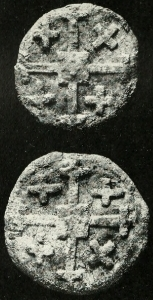
Sacramental bread in East Syriac tradition prepared with Holy Malka

Traditionally the East Syriac Churches use leavened bread for the Eucharist, like most churches of Eastern Christianity, but they are the only churches to include the additional ingredient of Holy Malka (or Holy Leaven). Holy Leaven is a powder added to sacramental bread before it is baked. Despite the name, Holy Leaven does not actually contain a leavening agent. Instead, hmira, fermented dough from previously used sacramental bread, is added and acts as leaven. What the Holy Leaven does contain is remainder from the original Holy Leaven, renewed annually by mixing it with common ingredients.

== See also ==
- Holy Qurobo
- Mass in the Catholic Church
- Divine Liturgy
- Holy Leaven
- Mystery of Crowning
