= Liturgy of Addai and Mari =

Eucharist liturgy in East Syriac Rite

The Liturgy of Addai and Mari (or the Holy Qurbana of Mar Addai and Mar Mari) is the Eucharistic liturgy belonging to the East Syriac Rite and was historically used in the Church of the East of the Sasanian (Persian) Empire. This liturgy is traditionally attributed to Saint Addai (disciple of Saint Thomas the Apostle) and Saint Mari (a disciple of Saint Addai). It is currently in regular use in the Assyrian Church of the East (including its archdiocese the Chaldean Syrian Church of India), the Ancient Church of the East, the Syro-Malabar Catholic Church of India, and the Chaldean Catholic Church. The latter two are Eastern Catholic churches in full communion with the Holy See of Rome.

== Overview ==
The Anaphora of Addai and Mari is similar to the ancient eucharistic rite of the Didache, belonging to "a primordial era" before the Words of Institution were made standard across other anaphoras. The Anaphora of Addai and Mari is perhaps the only anaphora in continuous use by an apostolic church since its establishment. The anaphora that is part of this liturgy is of particular interest, being one of the oldest in Christianity, possibly dating back to 3rd-century Edessa, even if the outline of the current form can only be traced as far back as the time of the Patriarch Ishoyahb III in the 7th century. In the form given in the oldest manuscripts, this anaphora does not include the Words of Institution, which has raised ecumenical concerns. The Eastern Catholic churches employing this liturgy have inserted the Words of Institution in accordance with their Eucharistic teaching.

Relations between Rome and the Assyrian Church have dramatically improved since the 1980s. The patriarch, Mar Dinkha IV, visited Pope John Paul II in Rome in 1984 and participated in a day of prayer for peace at Assisi in 1986. In 1994, Mar Dinkha and Pope John Paul II signed a common declaration in the Vatican. This common Christological declaration between the Catholic Church and the Assyrian Church of the East in 1994 established that both churches confessed the same doctrine concerning Christology (the divinity and humanity of Christ). This declaration went on to create a mixed committee for further theological dialogue between the two (now sister) churches. The text affirmed that Catholics and Assyrians are "united today in the confession of the same faith in the Son of God". In 2001 this committee drew up guidelines for mutual admission to the eucharist between the Chaldean Catholic Church and the Assyrian Church of the East, overcoming the issue of the lack of words of Institution in the Anaphora of Addai and Mari.

== Use ==
The Liturgy of Addai and Mari has been in continuous use in the Church of the East since at least the 7th century. Hymns by Saint Ephrem and others are often sung during the communion. A piece of dough from the eucharistic bread is saved from week to week, not as reserve sacrament but as leaven for the next week's bread. Authors from Theodore of Mopsuestia (c. 400) to Shimun XXI Eshai in the mid-20th century and Mar Aprem Mooken of India in the early 21st century have identified the Epiclesis, beginning with the words Netheh Mar Rookha d'Qudsha... (May the Holy Spirit come...) as the high point of the Holy Qurbana.

In the Syro-Malabar Church this liturgy has three forms: a simplified form, a standard form for Sundays use, and a highly solemn form, known as the Raza, used only on solemnities. A reform of the Raza in order to return to the unadulterated and original form was issued in 1985, followed in 1989 by a reform of the other two forms carried out with the same principles.

A slight reform of the liturgy of Addai and Mari celebrated by the Chaldean Catholic Church came into effect on 6 January 2007, making uniform the many different uses of each parish and removing additions introduced over the centuries in imitation of the Roman Rite. The main changes were: a return to the ancient arrangement of the interior of churches, restoration of the preparation of the bread and wine before the beginning of the service and removal of Filioque from the Creed.

The prayers of the liturgy of Addai and Mari are of three types, according as they are recited by the celebrating priest or bishop:

- cushapa: personal prayers of the celebrant
- gehanta or "inclinations": prayers said in low voice by the celebrant
- qanona: conclusions of the gehanta conducted aloud

== Absence of the Words of Institution ==
The Eucharistic Prayers (or Anaphoras) of all the present Christian Churches that believe in apostolic succession include the Words of Institution, and the relevant Institution narrative, with the sole exception of some versions of the Anaphora of Addai and Mari.

The oldest manuscript of this anaphora was published by W.F. Macomber in 1966 (known as Mar Eshaya text) and dates from about the 10th or 11th century. It does not include the Words of Institution, nor do other ancient manuscripts of later date. Mar Aprem Mooken of India indicates that many priests of the Assyrian Church of the East follow the old practice of not including the Words of Institution. The practitioners justify the absence of the Words of Institution by the practice of baking sacramental bread by Holy Leaven.

Some scholars believe that the medieval manuscript represents the 4th-century tradition (or even earlier), while others believe that the Words of Institution were originally present and were later dropped, probably due to the liturgical reform of Mar Isho-Yab III in about AD 650. The former include Macomber and Spinks, the latter H. Engerding and E. Mazza. B. Botte suggested that the Words of Institution were originally not written but recited from memory.

== Catholic Church's position ==
The Catholic Church has always recognized the validity of apostolic succession of the Church of the East, and thus the validity of its priesthood. Still some Catholics questioned the validity of the consecration in the absence of the Words of Institution because the Council of Florence had declared that the words (in Catholic theology, the "form") of the sacrament of the Eucharist are "the words of the Saviour with which he effected this sacrament", words that the same council indicated as "This is my body" and "This is the chalice of my blood".

Nevertheless, the Catholic Church never officially contested the validity of the Anaphora of Addai and Mari. In the closing decades of the 20th century, ecumenical rapprochement with the Assyrian Church of the East and the situation of the by then widely scattered Assyrian and Chaldean Christians who lacked a priest of their own Church made more acute the issue of the validity of the Eucharistic consecration of the form of the Anaphora of Addai and Mari that did not include the Words of Institution, as used by the Assyrian Christians, while the Eastern Catholic Churches that use the East Syriac Rite include in their versions of this liturgy the Institution narrative, with its Words of Institution. Accordingly, on 20 July 2001 the Holy See declared that the Anaphora of Addai and Mari can be considered valid. Three reasons were given for this judgment. First, the Anaphora of Addai and Mari dates back to the early Church. Secondly, the Church of the East has otherwise preserved the orthodox faith in regard to the Eucharist and Holy Orders. And finally, though the Words of Institution are not spoken expressly, their meaning is present: "The words of Eucharistic Institution are indeed present in the Anaphora of Addai and Mari, not in a coherent narrative way and ad litteram, but rather in a dispersed euchological way, that is, integrated in successive prayers of thanksgiving, praise and intercession".

=== Guidelines for admission to the Eucharist between the Chaldean Church and the Assyrian Church of the East ===
Catholic canon law excludes participation by Catholics in the Eucharistic services of Christian communities whose sacraments or priesthood it considers invalid, and permits participation by members of such communities in the Catholic Eucharist only in very exceptional circumstances and only if the individual members in question hold the same belief as the Catholic Church concerning the Eucharist; but in the case of Churches whose sacraments and priesthood it considers valid, it allows such participation much more easily. Accordingly, the 20 July 2001 document of the Holy See, titled Guidelines for admission to the Eucharist between the Chaldean Church and the Assyrian Church of the East, drew the following conclusions from the recognition of the validity of the Holy Qurbana of Addai and Mari as celebrated in the Assyrian Church of the East:

1. Assyrian faithful are permitted, when necessary, to participate and to receive Holy Communion in a Chaldean celebration of the Holy Eucharist.
2. Chaldean faithful unable to approach a Catholic minister are permitted to participate and to receive Holy Communion in an Assyrian celebration of the Holy Eucharist, even if celebrated using the Anaphora of Addai and Mari in its form without the Words of Institution.
3. Assyrian ministers are warmly invited (but not obliged) to insert the Words of Institution in the Anaphora of Addai and Mari when Chaldean faithful are present at the liturgy.

The provisions above are thus intended for occasions when it is not possible for Assyrian or Chaldean faithful to attend their own Church. They are not a declaration of full communion between the two Churches, although the document recognizes that the joint declaration signed by Pope John Paul II and Patriarch Dinkha IV of the Assyrian Church of the East has solved the main dogmatic problem between the two Churches and that on 29

November 1996 the Assyrian and Chaldean patriarchs had agreed to a list of common proposals aimed at re-establishing full communion.

Unlike the Catholic Church, the Assyrian Church of the East has an Open Communion practice, allowing any baptized Christian to receive its Eucharist.

Dialogue between the two Churches later slowed down and was suspended in 2002.

== Structure of the Anaphora ==
Taking into consideration only the more typical and ancient parts, the structure of the anaphora of this liturgy is the following:

- the Opening Dialogue,
- the preface (or first Gehanta):

Worthy of praise from every mouth and of confession from every tongue is the adorable and glorious name of the Father and Son and Holy Ghost, who didst create the world by thy grace and its inhabiters by thy mercifulness and didst save mankind by thy compassion and give great grace unto mortals.

- the Pre-Sanctus:

Thy majesty, o my Lord, thousand thousands of those on high bow down and worship and ten thousand times ten thousand holy angels and hosts of spiritual beings, ministers of fire and spirit, praise thy name with holy cherubin and seraphin shouting and praising without ceasing and crying one to another and saying:

- the Sanctus, without the Benedictus:

Holy holy holy Lord God of hosts heaven and earth are full of his praises

- the Post-Sanctus (or second Gehanta) centered on the Redemption by Christ. This prayer and all the following up to the end of the epiclesis are addressed directly to Christ.

And with these heavenly hosts we give thanks to thee, o my Lord, even we thy servants weak and frail and miserable, for that thou hast given us great grace past recompense in that thou didst put on our manhood that thou mightest quicken it by thy godhead, and hast exalted our low estate and restored our fall and raised our mortality and forgiven our trespasses and justified our sinfulness and enlightened our knowledge and, o our Lord and our God, hast condemned our enemies and granted victory to the weakness of our frail nature in the overflowing mercies of thy grace.

- the Oblation (or third Gehanta) which makes direct reference to the Body and Blood of Christ:

Do thou, o my Lord, in thy many and unspeakable mercies make a good and acceptable memorial for all the just and righteous fathers who have been wellpleasing in thy sight, in the commemoration of the body and blood of thy Christ which we offer unto thee on thy pure and holy altar as thou hast taught us, and grant us thy tranquillity and thy peace all the days of the world.

Yea, o our Lord and our God, grant us thy tranquillity and thy peace all the days of the world that all the inhabitants of the earth may know thee that thou art the only true God the Father and that thou hast sent our Lord Jesus Christ thy Son and thy beloved. And he our Lord and our God came and in his lifegiving gospel taught us all the purity and holiness of the prophets and the apostles and the martyrs and the confessors and the bishops and the doctors and the presbyters and the deacons and all the children of the holy catholic church, even them that have been signed with the living sign of holy baptism.

- the Anamnesis:

And we also, o my Lord, thy weak and frail and miserable servants who are gathered together in thy name, both stand before thee at this time and have received the example which is from thee delivered unto us, rejoicing and praising and exalting and commemorating and celebrating this great and fearful and holy and lifegiving and divine mystery of the passion and the death and the burial and the resurrection of our Lord our Saviour Jesus Christ.

- the Epiclesis:

And may there come, o my Lord, thine Holy Spirit and rest upon this offering of thy servants and bless it and hallow it that it be to us, o my Lord, for the pardon of offences and the remission of sins and for the great hope of resurrection from the dead and for new life in the kingdom of heaven with all those who have been wellpleasing in thy sight.

- the Doxology:

And for all this great and marvellous dispensation towards us we will give thee thanks and praise thee without ceasing in thy Church redeemed by the precious blood of thy Christ, with unclosed mouths and open faces lifting up praise and honour and confession and worship to thy living and holy and lifegiving name now and ever and world without end.

The Institution narrative, with its Words of Institution, is placed by Syro-Malabar Catholic Church in the middle of the Oblation, while the Chaldean Catholic Church places it just before the Epiclesis.

== See also ==
- Hallowing of Nestorius
- Hallowing of Theodore of Mopsuestia
- Holy Leaven
