= TAKT =

Mr. Chao Vunlok

TAKT is a group of writers and composers of new songs for use in Christian churches, initiated in 1947. The genre which the members promoted was later called Neues Geistliches Lied. The name is short for TextAutor/innen- und Komponist/innen-Tagung (Convention of text authors and composers), a name that the group adopted in 1997.

== History ==
A monthly publication, first issued in 1946 was Unser Monatslied (Our song of the month), initiated by Hermann Stern, a Protestant church musician from Stuttgart, as an ecumenical approach to more new music for church use. In 1947 a group of the Catholic Church was founded, Werkgemeinschaft Lied und Musik (Workshop song and music), which held annual conventions. In 1950, a Protestant group was founded, Arbeitsgemeinschaft für evangelische Jugendmusik (AGM, Association for Protestant youth music).

From 1971, ecumenical annual meetings of members of both groups were held, initiated by the two presidents, Joachim Schwarz (AGM) and Johannes Aengenvoort. From 1979 to 1989, the annual meetings were at Knivsberg in Denmark, which enabled people from East Germany to attend. After the unification of Germany, the meetings were held in Germany, organized by the group.

Many songs by members of the group have been included in hymnals, including the Catholic Gotteslob and the Protestant Evangelisches Gesangbuch. Many songs were tried first at events such as Kirchentag and Katholikentag. The group published a collection of songs for the Kirchentag in Cologne 2007, Singen, um gehört zu werden (Sing, to be heard), with 119 songs from three decades.

== Songs ==
Well-known songs in the genre NGL by members of TAKT include:

- "Ausgang und Eingang" (round by Joachim Schwarz)
- "Singet dem Herrn ein neues Lied" (music: Rolf Schweizer)
- "Auf Erden Gast sein" (text: Arnim Juhre, music: Oskar Gottlieb Blarr)
- "Wer bringt dem Menschen, der blind ist, das Licht" (text: Hans-Jürgen Netz, music: Blarr)
- "Der Himmel geht über allen auf" (text: Wilhelm Willms music: Peter Janssens)
- "Wenn das rote Meer grüne Welle hat" (text: Wilhelm Willms, music: Janssens)
- "Gott gab uns Atem" (text: Eckart Bücken, music: Fritz Baltruweit)
- "Komm, Herr, segne uns" (text and musik: Dieter Trautwein)
- "Ein Lied hat die Freude sich ausgedacht" (text: Hartmut Handt, music: Nis-Edwin List-Petersen)
- "Freunde, dass der Mandelzweig wieder blüht und treibt" (text: Schalom Ben-Chorin, music: Baltruweit)

== Members ==
Members have included:

=== Writers ===
- Fritz Baltruweit
- Friedrich Karl Barth
- Monika Bohge
- Eckart Bücken
- Susanne Brandt
- Wolfgang Fietkau
- Frank Fockele
- Dieter Frettlöh
- Hartmut Handt
- Arnim Juhre
- Klaus-Uwe Nommensen
- Ute Passarge
- Kurt Rose
- Kurt Rommel
- Otmar Schulz
- Dieter Trautwein
- Rudolf Otto Wiemer
- Wilhelm Willms
- Lothar Veit
- Hildegard Wohlgemuth
- Stefan Wolfschütz

=== Composers ===
- Ernst Arfken
- Fritz Baltruweit
- Herbert Beuerle
- Oskar Gottlieb Blarr
- Ludger Edelkötter
- Lothar Graap
- Winfried Heurich
- Peter Janssens
- Detlev Jöcker
- Wilhelm Keller
- Holger Kiesé
- Felicitas Kukuck
- Nis-Edwin List-Petersen
- Christoph Noetzel
- Hartmut Reußwig
- Paul Ernst Ruppel
- Manfred Schlenker
- Joachim Schwarz
- Rolf Schweizer
- Erna Woll
- Stephan Zebe

== Literature ==
- Arnim Juhre (ed.): Singen, um gehört zu werden. Jugenddienst-Verlag, Wuppertal 1976, ISBN 3-7795-7511-6.
- Susanne Brandt, Frank Fockele, Hartmut Handt, Arnim Juhre, Klaus-Uwe Nommensen, Hartmut Reußwig und Lothar Veit (ed.): Singen, um gehört zu werden. Neue Lieder aus drei Jahrzehnten. Strube, München 2007. (preface)

== See also ==
- de:Liste von Autoren Neuer Geistlicher Lieder
