= Liturgy of Saint Cyril =

Part of lithurgy in Coptic Churches

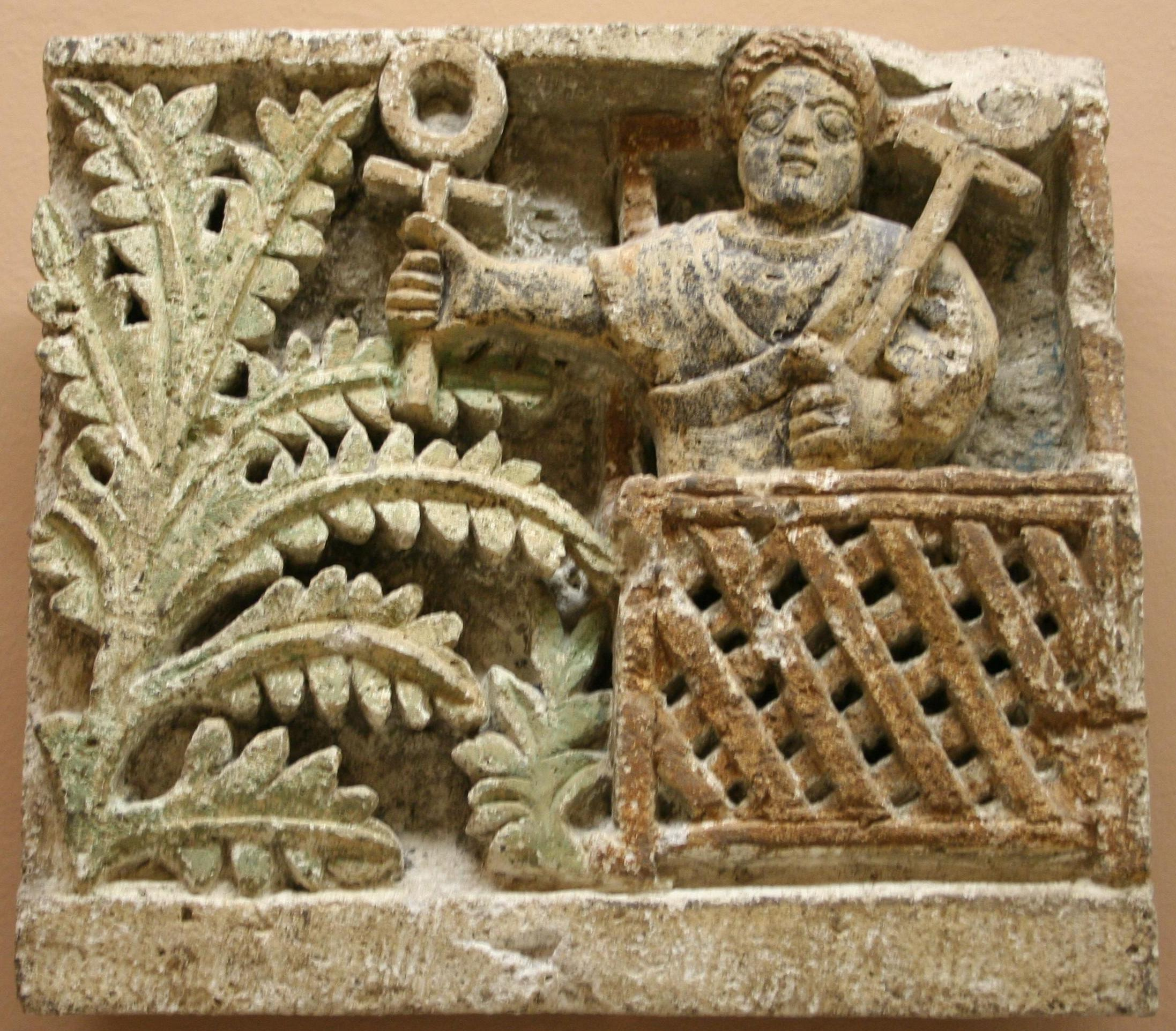
5th-century liturgical Coptic relief

The Liturgy of Saint Cyril (or Anaphora of Saint Cyril, Coptic: Ϯⲁ̀ⲛⲁⲫⲟⲣⲁ ⲛ̀ⲧⲉ ⲡⲓⲁ̀ⲅⲓⲟⲥ Ⲕⲩⲣⲓⲗⲗⲟⲥ, Ti-anaphora ente pi-agios Kyrillos) is one of the three Anaphoras used at present by the Coptic Orthodox Church and the Coptic Catholic Church and it retains the liturgical peculiarities which have originated in the early Christian Egypt, thus forming the core of the historical Alexandrian Rite. When reference is made to its Greek Byzantine Rite version, this text is usually known as Liturgy of Saint Mark (or Anaphora of Saint Mark).

== Present usage ==
This liturgy can be used at present by the Coptic Orthodox Church of Alexandria, as well as by the Coptic Catholic Church, during the Lent time or in the month of Koiak, but its prolongation and particular melodies makes its use uncommon today. This text does not cover the whole Divine Liturgy, extending only from the pre-anaphorical rites (the prayer of the veil) to the distribution of the Communion, thus including the anaphora in the strict sense of the word. The Coptic Liturgy of Saint Basil is used for the remaining part of the service.

In the Byzantine Rite, the Liturgy of Saint Mark, as transmitted by the Greek Orthodox Church of Alexandria, is used in a few places each year on the feast day of Saint Mark by the Russian Orthodox Church Outside Russia, which authorized it in 2007.

== History ==
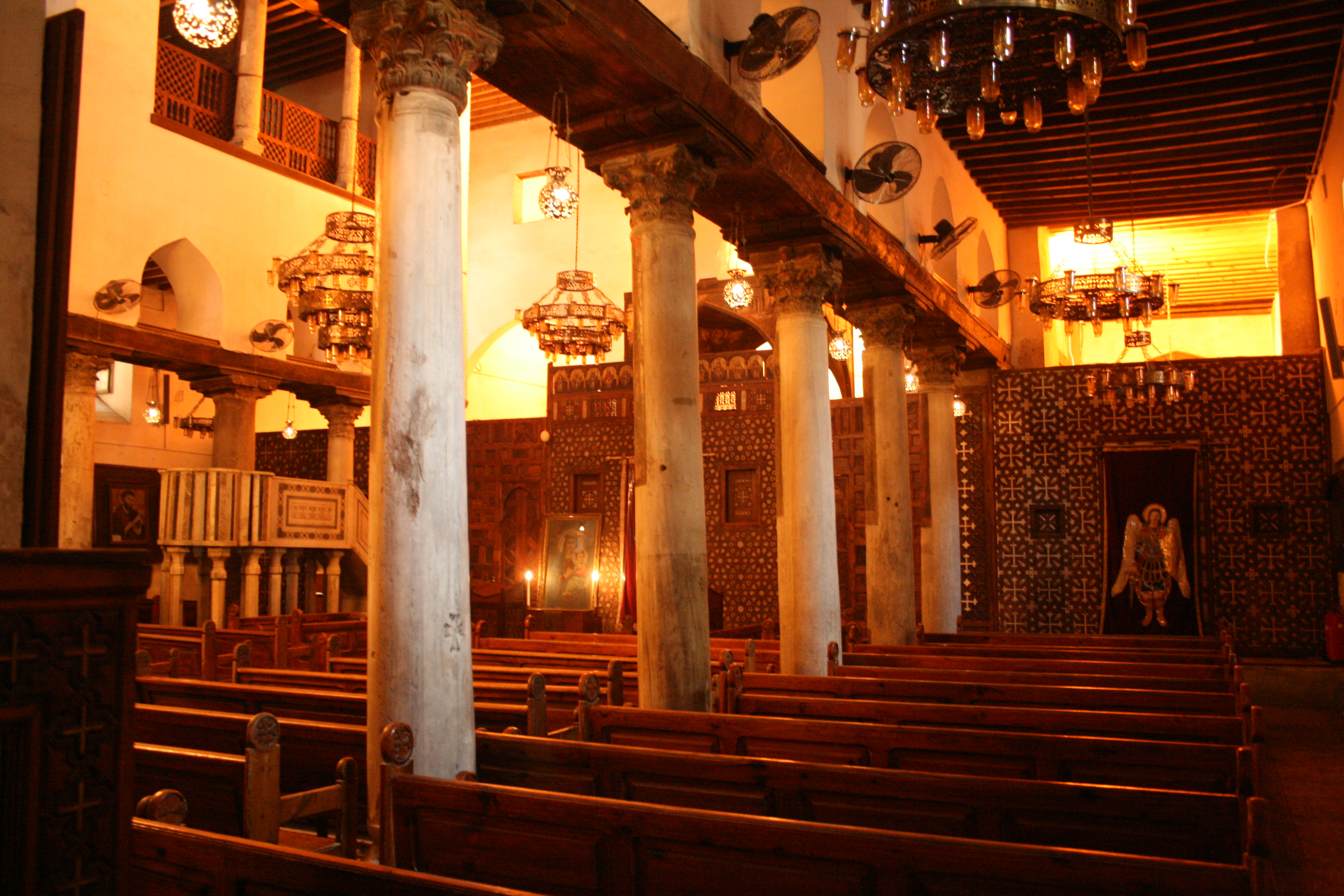
Medieval Coptic church of Saint Barbara

According to liturgical tradition, Christianity was brought to Alexandria in Egypt by Saint Mark. The town then acquired importance as a center of church government and Christian theology with its Catechetical School. The liturgical uses that developed locally are known as the Alexandrian Rite, and the texts used for the celebration of the Eucharist are known as the Liturgy of Saint Mark.

The lingua franca of the Western world in the early centuries of Christianity was the Koine Greek, and the Liturgy of Saint Mark was in such a language. The translation of this liturgy into Coptic, used by most of the Coptic population at that time, is attributed to Saint Cyril of Alexandria in the first half of the 5th century. Thus the Greek version of this liturgy is usually known as Liturgy of Saint Mark, while its Coptic version is regularly called Liturgy of Saint Cyril, even if the formal name of the latter is "the Anaphora of our holy father Mark the Apostle, which the thrice-blessed Saint Cyril the Archbishop established".

The oldest survived complete manuscripts of both the Liturgy of Saint Mark and of Saint Cyril date from the High Middle Ages. From the 5th century to the High Middle Ages both versions developed on parallel and mutually interconnected lines, with reciprocal translations and with most of the additions added to both of them. Both versions have some own peculiar material. The use of the Liturgy of Saint Mark by the Greek Orthodox Church of Alexandria was blamed by the Patriarch of Antioch and canonist Theodore Balsamon at the beginning of the 13th century.

== Manuscript Tradition ==
The first millennium witnesses of the early stages of this liturgy are the following fragments:

- The Strasbourg papyrus, written in the 4th or 5th century, includes the first part of the preface, with the paraphrase of Malachi 1:11 followed by some short intercessions and it ends with a doxology. Scholars disagree on whether this prayer in the 4th or 5th century is a part of the Liturgy of Mark or itself a complete prayer, however the majority leans towards seeing it as a complete Eucharist prayer separate from the Liturgy of Mark.
- The John Rylands parchment 465, written in Greek in the 6th century and badly conserved, includes the text from the first epiclesis up to the end of the anaphora.
- The British Museum Tablet, written in Coptic in the 8th century, includes the text from the first epiclesis up to the second epiclesis.
- some Sahidic Coptic fragments.

Other ancient texts which belong to the Alexandrian Rite are important in the study of the development of the Liturgy of Saint Mark: the Anaphora of Serapion is the earlier witness of some ancient material, the Anaphora of Barcelona and the Deir Balyzeh Papyrus are different developments based on the same material, the Cathecheses of Cyril of Jerusalem are useful to trace the relationship with the Liturgy of St. James.

The earlier manuscripts of the Liturgy of Saint Cyril date from the 12th century and are in Bohairic Coptic. It is not known whether they derive directly from the Greek or through lost Sahidic versions. These manuscripts include some additions not found in the Liturgy of Saint Mark in Greek, but in general their readings are closer to the first millennium fragments than those of the Greek version.

The earlier manuscripts of the Liturgy of Saint Mark are: the Codex Rossanensis, the Rotulus Vaticanus, the incomplete Rotulus Messanensis. Another witness is the lost manuscript of the library of the Greek Orthodox Church of Alexandria, copied in 1585–6 by Patriarch Meletius Pegas. The Rotulus Vaticanus, and even more the text copied by Pegas, show a progress in the process of assimilation to Byzantine usages.

== Structure of the anaphora ==
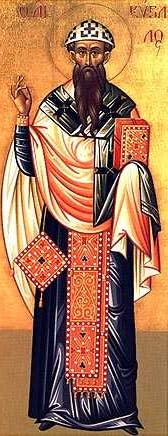
Saint Cyril of Alexandria

The anaphora of Saint Mark (or Saint Cyril) found in the High Middle Ages manuscripts shows all the typical peculiarities of the Alexandrine Rite, such as a long Preface which includes an offering and immediately followed by the intercessions, two epiclesis, the absence of the Benedictus in the Sanctus. The structure of the anaphora (in the strict sense of the word) can be so summarized:

- The Opening Dialogue,
- The preface, composed of:
  - praises to the Father for the creation of heaven and earth, the sea and all that is in them (quoting Psalm 146:6 as usually found in the Alexandrine anaphoras), followed by praises also to Christ,
  - A first Oblation, offering the reasonable sacrifice and the bloodless worship (ref. Romans12:1), followed by a paraphrase of Malachi 1:11,
- Intercessions section, composed of:
  - lengthy prayers for the Church, the living, the dead, commemorations of Saint Mark and of Mary, and followed by the diptychs,
  - a second Oblation, requesting that the offerings are received in the heavenly altar as were the sacrifices of Abel and Abraham (similar to the "Supra quae - Supplices te" of the Roman Canon),
  - additional intercessions for the living, including the names of the current Pope of Alexandria and bishop,
- A well developed Pre-Sanctus,
- The Sanctus, without the Benedictus as usual in early Egypt, followed by a short Post-Sanctus centered on Christ,
- A first epiclesis that simply asks God to fill the sacrifice with blessing through the descent of the Holy Spirit,
- The Institution narrative, in which are pronounced the Words of Institution,
- The Anamnesis of the Passion, Resurrection and Ascension of Christ,
- A third Oblation, offering the bread and the cup,
- A second epiclesis directed to the Holy Spirit, with an explicit request to change the bread and wine into the Body and Blood of Christ (this should not necessarily be understood as a single "moment" or consecration or transformation, as the liturgical theology is a little more nuanced in Alexandrian liturgy). This epiclesis uses the aorist tense, thus simply narrating a conversion without stating whether it occurs in the present, future or past.
- A final prayer for the fruits of the Communion.

In the present use of the Coptic Orthodox Church, the section containing the Intercessions and the second Oblation has been moved to the end of the anaphora, following the pattern used in the Coptic Liturgies of Saint Basil and Saint Gregory based an Antiochene structure.

== Published editions ==
=== Full text available online ===
- "The Divine Liturgy of the Holy Apostle and Evangelist Mark, The Disciple of the Holy Peter". Ante-Nicene Fathers. Christian Classics Ethereal Library. (from the Codex Rossanensis)
- Online text of the Liturgy of St. Cyril as used at present by the Coptic Church
- "Liturgy of St. Mark". Occidentalis: Your Informal, Omnibus Resource For Western Rite in the Orthodox Church. Translated by Shaw, John. Archived from the original on 2 March 2013. (as used at present by the Russian Orthodox Church Outside Russia)

=== Other editions ===
- 1583 edition in Greek and Latin of the Liturgy of St. Mark
