= Strasbourg papyrus =

The Strasbourg papyrus is a papyrus made of six fragments on a single leaf written in Greek and conserved at the National Academic Library in Strasbourg, cataloged Gr. 254. It was first edited in 1928. The Strasbourg papyrus contains an ancient Christian prayer, probably an Anaphora, similar to the first part of the Alexandrine Anaphora of Saint Mark (later known also as Anaphora of Saint Cyril). The Papyrus was probably written in the fourth or fifth century, but it may present an older text, resulting to be one of the older Eucharistic Prayer known.

Since the 1970s many scholars started to think that this prayer is in itself a complete anaphora, even if this assumption has been challenged after the publication of the Barcelona Papyrus. The structure of such a prayer is very different from the thanksgiving over the wine and bread as found in chapter 9 and 10 of the Didache. Actually there is not even a mention of any food; nor does it present the Sanctus, nor an anamnesis nor an epiclesis and not even the Words of Institution. This text is anyway considered to include the base structure that we can find later in many other famous anaphoras.

== Content ==
The Strasbourg Papyrus starts with a praise the Father for the creation of heaven and earth, the sea and all that is in them, quoting Psalm 146:6 as usual in the Alexandrine anaphoras. It continues with a reference to Jesus Christ the Saviour, followed by we offer the reasonable (λογικὴν) sacrifice and this bloodless worship (ref. Romans 12:1) and by the quotation of Malachi 1:11.

The second part starts with the simple sentence Sacrifice of incense and offering., and it is followed by an intercession prayer for many different subjects, as the Church, the army, the princes, the souls of those who have fallen asleep, the orthodox fathers and the bishops. Unlike the intercessions in the Didache, here the prayer is not only for those who participated the liturgy, but it intercedes more generally. The Papyrus leaf ends with a doxology.
