= Deir Balyzeh Papyrus =

6th-century papyrus of Christian texts

The Deir Balyzeh Papyrus (or Der Balyzeh Euchologion) is a 6th-century papyrus, coming from Egypt. It contains early fragmentary Christian texts: three prayers, a short creed and a portion of Anaphora (i.e. a Eucharistic Prayer).

== Manuscript tradition ==
The fragments of this papyrus, composed of three leaves written on both sides and now in the Bodleian Library, were found in 1907 in the ruins of the Deir Balyzeh monastery in the village of Al Balyzeh (or Balayzah, Bala'izah, Arabic: البلايزة) in the Asyut Governorate: this monastery, which had an estimated population of 1000 monks, was in use from about the 500 and was abandoned after the 750.

The fragments are in Greek written in uncial script, and are dated to the end of the 6th century. These fragments were published by P. de Puniet in 1909. Other fragments were later discovered and the texts were re-edited in 1949 by C.H. Roberts and B. Capelle.

== Anaphora ==
The anaphora included in the Deir Balyzeh Papyrus belongs to the Egyptian type, but it shows a different development from the Anaphora of Saint Mark, even if both are built on same ancient material. Similarities with the anaphora of Serapion suggests the second half of the 4th century as possible dating of the contents.

This anaphora has a definitely consecratory epiclesis placed before the Words of Institution, as in the Roman Canon, in the anaphora of Barcelona and in the Cathecheses of Cyril of Jerusalem, while other Egyptian texts such as the Anaphora of Saint Mark have here a less developed epiclesis that simply asks the Holy Spirit to fill the bread and cup. The content of this anaphora, which initial and final fragments are lost, is:

- ... (lacuna) ... Pre-Sanctus,
- Sanctus, without the Benedictus as usual in early Egypt,
- an Epiclesis directed to the Holy Spirit, with an explicit request to change the bread and wine into the Body and Blood of Christ,
- a text similar to that found in the Didache about the gathering of the Church as the becoming one of the scattered bread on hills,
- a short Institution narrative,
- the Anamnesis ... (lacuna) ...

The fragments ends with a final Doxology, which could belong also to a thanksgiving prayer after the Communion.

== Creed ==
The Deir Balyzeh Papyrus contains a short Christian creed which could have a baptismal use. It can be dated no later than the 4th century, even if it could be more ancient. The text is:

I believe in God the Father almighty
and in your only begotten Son our Lord,
our Lord Jesus Christ,
in the Holy Spirit,
in the resurrection of the flesh,
in the holy catholic Church.

== Three Prayers ==
Apart from the anaphora and the short creed, other three prayers are included in the Deir Balyzeh Papyrus, which are not directly linked to the celebration of sacraments, but can be considered as prayers for all times. The prayers begin as follow: "You, our help ...", "May he give us charity ..." and "We pray you, o Master ...".
