= Eva Lind =

Austrian opera singer

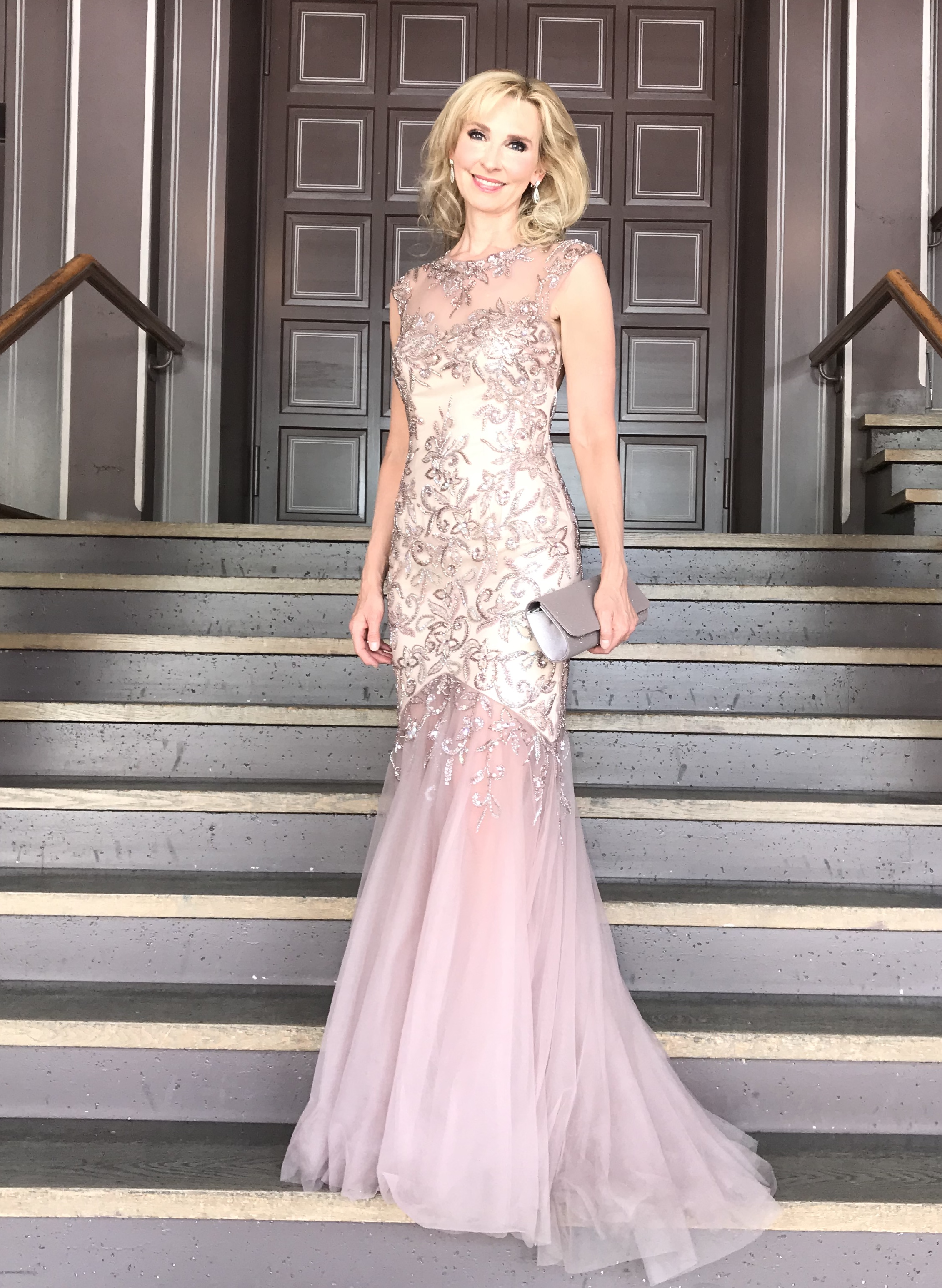
- Eva Lind at the Bayreuth Festival 2019
- Born: 14 June 1966 (age 60); Innsbruck, Austria
- Education: University of Vienna
- Occupation: Soprano singer
- Years active: 1985–present
- Website: www.eva-lind.at

Eva Lind (born 14 June 1966) is an Austrian soprano singer and TV presenter. She has specialised in coloratura soprano opera roles since 1985, and sings in concerts and recitals.

Lind has appeared on television as performer and presenter. She hosted several music programs, including ARD's Straße der Lieder from 2003 to 2008, alongside Gotthilf Fischer.

Andrew Lamb in Gramophone described her voice as "sheer delight, fresh, crisp, clear, beautifully agile and with superb trills."

== Life and career ==
=== Education ===
Lind was born in Innsbruck. She began her vocal training at the Tyrol State Conservatory in her native city, and won the Austrian competition Jugend musiziert in 1983. In the same year, she debuted as Flowermaiden in Wagner's Parsifal at the Tyrolean State Theatre. While studying philosophy, journalism and theatre studies at the University of Vienna she continued her professional training as a singer. Her teachers were Marta Lantieri, Ruthilde Boesch and Wilma Lipp.

=== Singing career ===
In 1985, at the age of 19, Lind appeared as the Queen of the Night in Mozart's The Magic Flute at the Vienna State Opera, where she was engaged as an ensemble member in the following years, singing roles including Lucia in Lucia di Lammermoor, Sophie in Der Rosenkavalier, Adele in Die Fledermaus, and Sophie in Massenet's Werther.

She sang in Donizetti's Lucia di Lammermoor in the 1985/86 season at the Theater Basel. In 1986, she debuted at the Salzburg Festival as Italian Singer in Capriccio. She also performed in Monte-Carlo (Lucia di Lammermoor), Stuttgart (Die Fledermaus), Zürich, Berlin, Munich (The Magic Flute). In 1987, she debuted at the Théâtre des Champs-Élysées in Jean-Pierre Ponnelle's new production of The Magic Flute conducted by Daniel Barenboim. In 1988, she appeared for the first time at the Royal Albert Hall and the Glyndebourne Festival as Nannetta in Verdi's Falstaff conducted by Bernard Haitink. In 1991, she debuted in the role of Gilda (Rigoletto) alongside Alfredo Kraus at the Teatro de la Maestranza, and in 1996, in Violetta (La traviata) at the Staatstheater Wiesbaden. In 1997, she performed the Woodbird in Wagner's Siegfried at La Scala in Milan, and in 1998, Oscar in Un ballo in maschera at the Arena di Verona Festival.

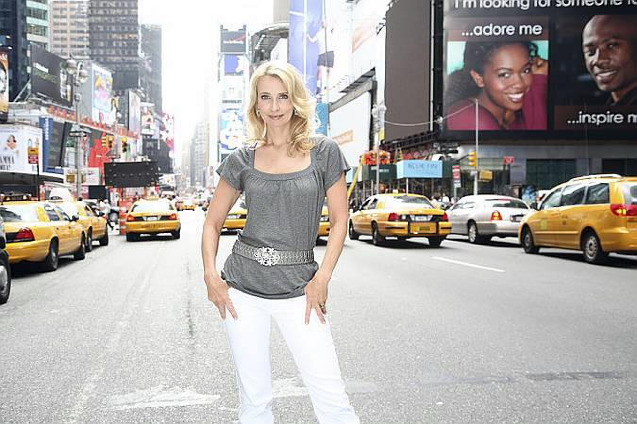
Eva Lind in New York for her concert at Carnegie Hall 2007

In 2002, she sang the lead role in the premiere of Mascagni's operetta Sì at the Vienna Volksoper.

She went on a concert tour through Japan with members of the Vienna Philharmonic in January 2010 and gave a solo recital at Milan's Teatro Dal Verme on 5 May 2010. In July 2010, she sang Gilda in Rigoletto (with Leo Nucci as Rigoletto) at the Opera Festival in Solothurn.

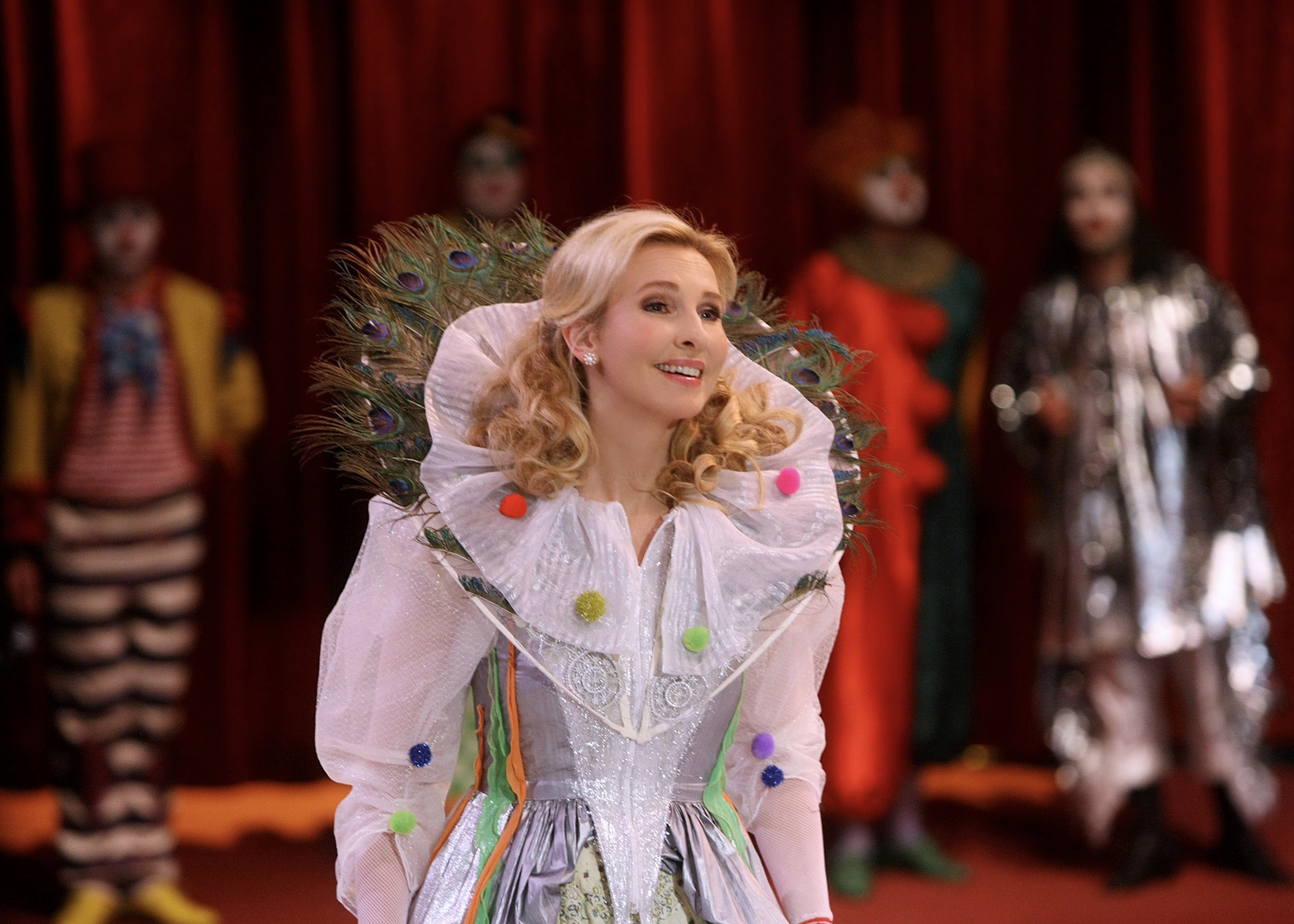
Eva Lind as Nedda in the opera I Pagliacci 2012

Lind sang her first Nedda in Leoncavallo's Pagliacci in July 2012 at the Schlossfestspiele Schwerin.

Lind made regular opera and concert appearances in China. In 2003, she sang Konstanze in Die Entführung aus dem Serail with the Staatstheater Stuttgart in Hong Kong. In 2005, she debuted in the role of Rosina in The Barber of Seville in a guest performance of the Teatro dell'Opera di Roma at the Shanghai Opera House. From 27 December 2010, until 6 January 2011, she toured Beijing, Shanghai, Qingdao, Dalian, Hangzhou, Changsha, Meizhou in New Year concerts with the Berliner Symphoniker. In March/April 2014 she went on a solo recital tour to Shanghai, Chongqing, Dalian, Xuzhou, Nanning and Nanchang together with Chinese pianist Xin Sui.

She also made guest appearances at venues in Berlin (Berlin State Opera, Deutsche Oper Berlin, Berliner Philharmonie), Munich (Bavarian State Opera, Philharmonie am Gasteig, Herkulessaal, Cuvilliés Theatre), London (Royal Festival Hall), Madrid (Teatro de la Zarzuela), Zurich (Tonhalle, Zürich Opera House), Amsterdam (Opera House), Stockholm (Royal Swedish Opera), Buenos Aires (Teatro Colón), Mexico City, Tokyo (Suntory Hall, Tokyo Opera City), Osaka (Symphony Hall).

=== Television career ===
Eva Lind made her first TV appearance in 1983 on the ORF talent show Die große Chance. Under the direction of Claudio Abbado she appeared in 1985 alongside Montserrat Caballé and Marilyn Horne in the TV production Rossini at Versailles. In 2002, she presented the Stars von morgen series on Arte. In 2003 and 2004 she hosted and sang in ZDF's program Adventliche Klänge aus Dresden at the Dresden Frauenkirche. From 2003 until the program's end in 2008 she was a host with Gotthilf Fischer in Straße der Lieder, Saturday evening Volkslieder program on ARD. In 2009 she hosted the Semperopernball on MDR Fernsehen with Gunther Emmerlich.

=== Academy of Music Tyrol ===
Lind founded the Academy of Music Tyrol (Musicakademie Tirol) in 2015, which offers masterclasses for classical singing and instruments.

== Awards ==
- European Sponsorship Prize for Young Artists (Europäischer Förderpreis für junge Künstler)
- Decoration of Honour of the State of Tyrol (Ehrenzeichen des Landes Tirol, 2016)

== Discography ==
=== Recitals and collaborations ===
- Frühlingsstimmen– Wiener Volksopernorchester, Franz Bauer-Theussl (Philips, 1986)
- Coloratura Arias – Münchner Rundfunkorchester, Heinz Wallberg (Philips, 1988)
- Operatic Duets (with Francisco Araiza), Tonhalle Orchester Zürich, Ralf Weikert (Philips, 1990)
- Ich bin verliebt – Accademia di Montegridolfo, Gustav Kuhn (BMG, 1996)
- My Romance (with José Carreras), The London Musicians Orchestra, David Giménez Carreras (Erato, 1997)
- Operetten-Gala der Weltstars (with Plácido Domingo, José Carreras, Thomas Hampson, Andrea Rost), Budapest Philharmonic Orchestra, Marcello Viotti [Live from Kaiservilla] (Deutsche Grammophon, 1999)
- Lieder, die zu Herzen geh'n – Deutsches Filmorchester Babelsberg, Erich Becht (Koch Classics, 2000)
- Sentimento – Philharmonic Orchestra München, Herrmann Weindorf (Koch Universal, 2001)
- Wunder gescheh'n – Philharmonic Orchestra München, Herrmann Weindorf (Koch Universal, 2003)
- Ich will leben – Kölner Symphonisches Orchester, Erich Becht (Hänssler Classic, 2005)
- Mozart rennt – Das Rennquintett (Bayer Records, 2006)
- Stille Nacht – Kölner Symphonisches Orchester, Erich Becht (Sony BMG, 2006)
- Magic Moments (with Tobey Wilson), Philharmonic Orchestra München, Herrmann Weindorf (Seven Days Music, 2008)
- Frühling im Herzen (with Gunther Emmerlich) accompanied by Johann Strauss Ensemble (MCP Sound & Media, 2011)
- Eva Lind - Bijoux (Solo Musica, 2014)
- Regenbogenfarben (ABAKUS Musik, 2015)
- Die Symphonie des Lebens (NAXOS, 2018)
- Weihnachtslieder Klassik (with Detlev Jöcker) (Sony, 2020)

=== Complete opera recordings ===
- Die Fledermaus (Adele) Münchner Rundfunkorchester, Plácido Domingo (EMI, 1986)
- La sonnambula (Amina) Orchestra of Eastern Netherlands, Gabriele Bellini (ARTS, 1999)
- Ariadne auf Naxos (Najade) Gewandhausorchester Leipzig, Kurt Masur (Philips, 1988)
- Hänsel und Gretel (Taumännchen) Bayerisches Rundfunk-Sinfonieorchester, Jeffrey Tate (EMI, 1990)
- Die Zauberflöte (Papagena) Academy of St Martin in the Fields, Sir Neville Marriner (Philips, 1990)
- Der Freischütz (Ännchen) Staatskapelle Dresden, Sir Colin Davis (Philips, 1991)
- La finta semplice (Ninetta) Kammerorchester Ch. P. E. Bach, Peter Schreier (Philips, 1991)
- Les contes d'Hoffmann (Olympia) Staatskapelle Dresden, Jeffrey Tate (Decca, 1992)
- Die Frau ohne Schatten (Hüter der Schwelle) Wiener Philharmoniker, Sir Georg Solti (Decca, 1992)

=== Symphonic works, oratorios ===
- Ein Sommernachtstraum (Mendelssohn Bartholdy) Wiener Philharmoniker, Sir André Previn (Philips, 1986)
- La cetra appesa (Azio Corghi) Orchestra Sinfonica Arturo Toscanini, Will Humburg (Dischi Ricordi, 1995)
- L'Apocalypse selon Saint Jean (Jean Françaix) Göttinger Symphonieorchester, Christian Simonis (Wergo, 1998)
- Missa est (Helmut Eder) Radio-Symphonieorchester Wien, Leopold Hager [rec. 1986 Salzburg] (Oehms Classics, 2005)
- Missa in Angustiis (Haydn) SWR Symphonieorchester, Michael Gielen (Glor Classics, 2009)

=== DVDs ===
- Salute to Vienna (1999) with Gregory Peck, Boys Choir of Harlem, Vienna Boys' Choir [released in 2001]
- Die große Operettengala (Sony Classical, 2007) [also on CD; re-release of Operetten-Gala der Weltstars]
- Eva Lind – Ihre grössten Erfolge aus 'Straße der Lieder' (Koch Universal, 2008) [also on CD]

== Bibliography ==
- "Eva Lind" in Großes Sängerlexikon, Karl J. Kutsch & Leo Riemens. Bern, Munich: Saur (ISBN 3-598-11419-2), 3rd edition, 1999, volume 3, p. 2075.
