= Ökumenische Arbeitsgruppe Homosexuelle und Kirche =

German LGBT Christian volunteer group

Ökumenische Arbeitsgruppe Homosexuelle und Kirche e. V.
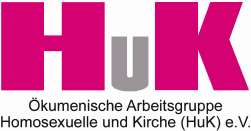
- Founded: 11 June 1977
- Type: LGBT rights
- Purpose: Lesbian, gay and transgender rights and anti-discrimination
- Location(s): Nuremberg and Aachen, Germany
- Region served: Germany
- Key people: Thomas Pöschl
- Website: www.huk.org

Ökumenische Arbeitsgruppe Homosexuelle und Kirche (HuK), German for Working Group Homosexuality and Church, is a German NGO organized by LGBTTIQ Christians of different denominations in concern of homosexual people in religion and churches. Although the claim of the association is cross-gender, the members are mostly gay men. Lesbians who are interested in this topic are also organized in women-specific associations in Germany.

== History ==
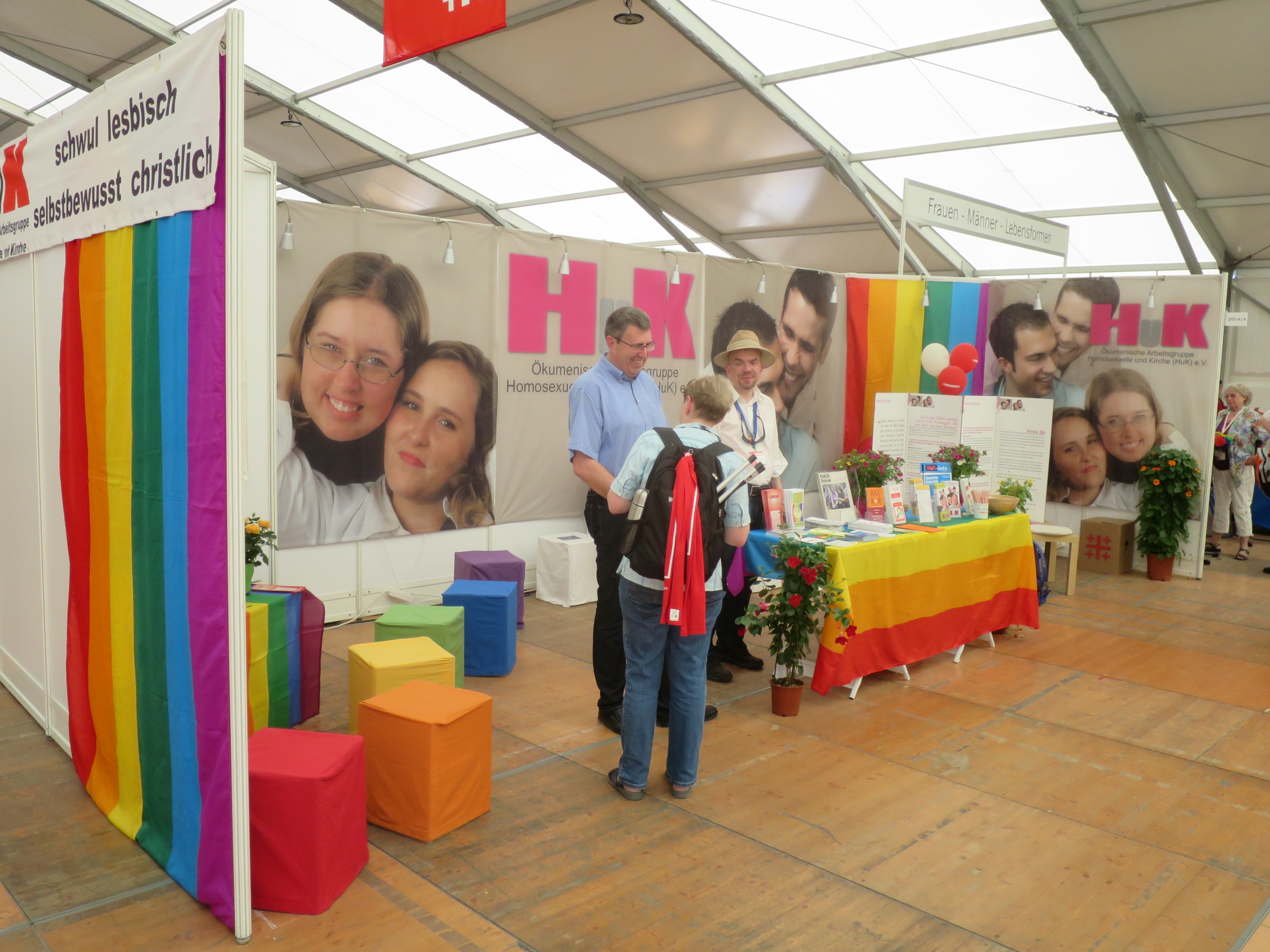
Booth of HuK during 35th German Protestant Church Fair, Stuttgart, in 2015

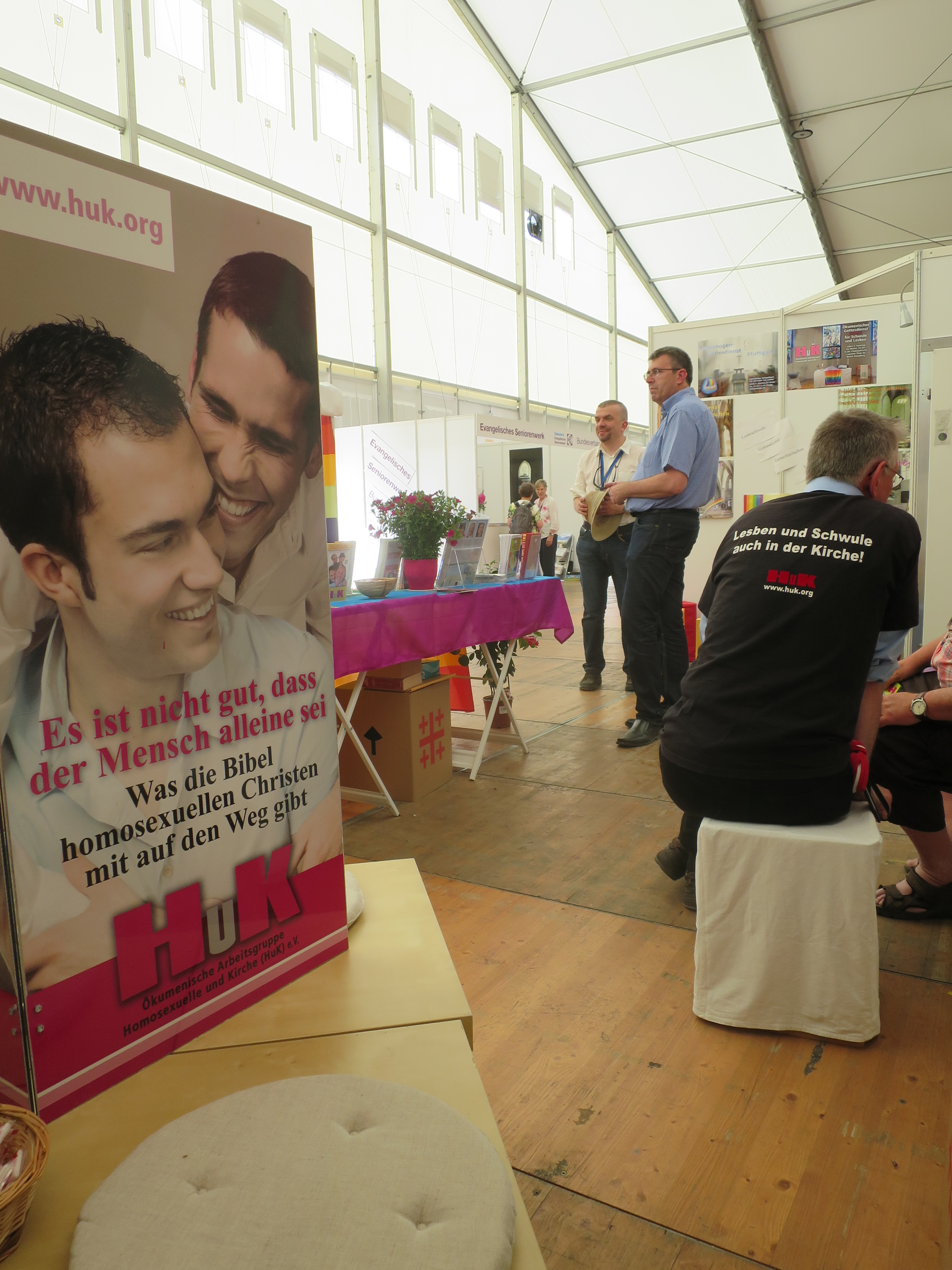
Booth of HuK during 35th German Protestant Church Fair in 2015

The founders of the group which eventually became HuK gathered at the Deutscher Evangelischer Kirchentag German Protestant Church Fair in 1977 and founded the group. That makes HuK one of the oldest lesbian-gay organisations in Germany. The members came from diverse backgrounds, the common factor being the discrimination experienced in the churches. At the same time, HuK was distrusted in the gay community because it did not distance itself from the discriminatory churches but wanted to achieve progress from within. In 1978 HuK had 71 members, in February 1979 it was 101 already. Regional groups were formed, for example in Berlin, Frankfurt and Tübingen. At the beginning, the main concern was to stop the churches from classifying homosexual people as "sick" and to put an end to discrimination against homosexuals within the churches.

In the early 1980s, the group strengthened its structures and consolidated itself. Initially, the organization was not even a registered association (Note: A registered association (eingetragener Verein – e. V.) is the most common form under German law for organized common activities of people.) and there have been heated discussions from 1981 on about whether the association should commit itself to such a fixed legal framework or whether that was more of a threat. From 1981 onwards, membership fees have been charged in order to be able to finance the activities at the church fairs. On 19 March 1983, an association statute was passed by a general meeting of the members and a member working as a lawyer in Marburg was commissioned to register it with the district court (Amtsgericht). The court in Marburg consulted the two main regional church organizations, the Evangelische Kirche von Kurhessen und Waldeck (Protestant Church of Hesse Electorate-Waldeck) and the Roman Catholic Diocese of Fulda. As expected, they had reservations. So, this first attempt to register HuK failed. The second attempt, which amended "ecumenical" to the name of HuK, ended successfully in 1985 – at the district court in Nuremberg.

Deutsche Evangelische Kirchentage have been HuK's primary field of activity from the 1970s onwards. Initially participation was difficult, heavily influenced by concerns on the part of the organizers and by obstacles to get access to the events. Attacks by right-wing evangelicals also occurred. At the Kirchentag in Nuremberg in 1979, HuK helped to organize a discussion panel on the topic of "Homosexuality and the Gospel". At this Kirchentag, HuK campaigned with a petition for Pastor Klaus Brinker, who had been refused as pastor in a parish by the Evangelisch-lutherische Landeskirche Hannovers. The petition received 4,709 supporting signatures, a number sufficient to make it an official statement of the Kirchentag. Since the Kirchentag in Frankfurt in 1987, HuK has been taking part in the Protestant Kirchentag as a regular participant.

Only one year after its foundation HuK was present at the Roman Catholic Church Fair in Freiburg in 1978 – albeit rather hidden: it found shelter with the Protestant student congregation, in the "Alternatives Zentrum" (Alternative Centre ). Efforts to include the group in the official programme of the following Katholikentag in 1980 failed due to the Roman Catholic Church's fear of the topic. The Roman Catholic Church initially remained incapable of dialogue. However, an appeal to the German Bishops' Conference and to the Central Committee of German Catholics, calling for an end to discrimination against homosexual people in the church and the initiation of a dialogue, found almost 3,000 supporting signatures at the Katholikentag. At the same time, HuK participated in the preparation of the "Katholikentag von unten", (Note: The "Katholikentag von unten" is an alternative format to the "Katholikentag" organized by lay people and opposition groups within the Roman Catholic Church.) which took place in 1980 parallel to the official Katholikentag. At that time this has been the only opportunity for HuK to be present on the event until 1994. Only after that it became possible for HuK to be present also at every Katholikentag ever since. In 2014, the Katholikentag extended an invitation to HuK for the first time, while the initiative had always come from HuK up to that point.

In 2020/21, HuK was honoured for its commitment to freedom and humanity within the Christian churches with the Herbert Haag Prize and became a member of the Ecumenical Church Fair in Frankfurt.

== Aims ==
The principal goal of HuK is a sexual ethic in which lesbian and gay relationships can be lived equally and do not represent an obstacle in church life or for holding an office within the church. Meanwhile, the aim is to help people who have problems with their church employers due to their being LGBTTIQ* and discriminated against.

The organization considers itself as a link between gay culture and that of the churches – cultures that are often alienated from another. It also defines itself as a "self-help group of lesbian and gay Christians" and as an emancipation movement. HuK expanded its commitment to the concerns of transgender and intersexual people within the churches. HuK works on a theological basis for the equality of gays, lesbians, transgender and intersexual people in church and society and to reduce discrimination along the way.

== Work ==
HuK provides information and tries to disclose prejudices and ignorance on the subject of homosexuality. This includes publicly commenting on undifferentiated and unqualified statements on homosexuality and on structures and current events that affect the relation between LGBT and churches. HuK continuously shows presence at the Protestant and Catholic Church Fairs. However, cooperation with church congregations, associations and committees within the church is also important for HuK to achieve its goals.

Outside the church, HuK is recognized as an expert organization in questions of homosexuality and the church. In several proceedings it has been asked by the Federal Constitutional Court to offer statements when the court checked laws for their constitutionality.

Thrice a year HuK issues a magazine for its members, HuK-Info.

== Accomplishments ==
Some successes have been achieved with the Protestant churches in Germany. Because they are organized on a regional basis and quite independent from one another the variation in attitude towards homosexuality is considerably broad. But in most of them recognition of gay and lesbian lifestyles could be achieved, also in a number of them marriage for same sex couples is possible as well as joint living of gay or lesbian partnerships in vicarages.

In the Roman Catholic Church, there have been only marginal successes on the official level, even so it can be quite different in some places on the level of individual parishes.

== Organization ==
HuK is a registered association supported by voluntary work only. Also, the executive board works on a voluntary basis. It consists of three to five members. Between the general meeting of the members – usually once a year – and the executive board operates a council of delegates, convening twice a year. There are 13 regional groups in a number of cities and regions. The group in Hanover is organized as a separate independent registered association. On the other hand, HuK is operating through thematic working groups. These include a working group on Protestant Church Policy and on Catholic Church Policy each. In addition, individual counselling is offered.

Furthermore, HuK works within international contexts as in the European Forum of LGBT Christian Groups and in the International Lesbian, Gay, Bisexual, Trans and Intersex Association. In the German-speaking area, it is networked with numerous other church- or Christian-oriented LGBT organizations and beyond.
