= Monika Bohge =

German writer

Monika Bohge (Lüdenscheid, 1947) is a German writer.

== Biography ==
She studied to become a teacher of mathematics and religion and worked in several centres for people with disabilities. She has authored many spiritual chants and was a member of the band TAKT.

== Works ==
- Ich frage mich. Strube-Verlag 1988 (Mus.: Herbert Beuerle)
- Die Geschichte von Zachäus. Strube-Verlag 1991 (Mus.: Joachim Schwarz)
- Rede nicht von deinem Glauben. 1995 (Mus.: Hartmut Reußwig)
- Du bist dabei. Strube-Verlag 2001 (Mus.: Rolf Schweizer)
- Begegnung mit dem Propheten. Strube-Verlag 2004 (Mus.: Rolf Schweizer)

== External links and references ==
- Werke von und über Monika Bohge in the German National Library catalogue
