= Fritz Baltruweit =

Fritz Baltruweit (born 28 July 1955) is a Lutheran pastor and a prolific writer of text and music of hymns of the genre Neues Geistliches Lied (NGL).

== Life and career ==
Born in Gifhorn on 28 July 1955, the son of a dean, Baltruweit studied Protestant theology. He was pastor of the Lutheran parish Stephanus in Berenbostel from 1984. In 1992 he became head of studies at the seminary in Loccum. He worked at the Christus-Pavillon of the Expo 2000 in Hanover from 1998 and 2001, where he was responsible for the programs. He worked from 2001 for publicity of the Landeskirche Hannovers. From 2004 he worked also at the Protestant centre for services and church music at St. Michael in Hildesheim of the Landeskirche Hannovers. He worked also in the ministry in vacation. He retired in November 2020.

=== Kirchentag and ecumenism ===
Baltruweit worked for the Deutscher Evangelischer Kirchentag. He worked also for the Lutheran World Federation and the World Council of Churches.

He founded a band for his music in 1977, the Studiogruppe Baltruweit. He was a member of the ecumenic authors' societies, later named TAKT.

In 2003 he played for 200,000 listeners at the final open-air service of the Ecumenic Kirchentag in Berlin. He retired from Kirchentag during the 2025 Kirchentag in Hanover with a concert at the Marktkirche, after taking part in 30 events as musician and as participant.

Baltruweit composed more than thousand new songs. Several of them were included in the Protestant Evangelisches Gesangbuch (EG) and the Catholic Gotteslob (GL) and other hymnals. He wrote also the texts for about half of his songs.

== Compositions ==
- "Wo ein Mensch Vertrauen gibt" (1977; text: Hans-Jürgen Netz [1975]; EG 604)
- "In der Mitte der Nacht" (1978; text: Sybille Fritsch; GL 827)
- "Fürchte dich nicht" (Kirchentag 1981; EG 630)
- "Freunde, dass der Mandelzweig" (1981; text: Schalom Ben-Chorin [1942] after Jeremiah 1:11; EG regional part)
- "Gott gab uns Atem" (1982; text: Eckart Bücken [1982]; EG 432; GL 468)
- "Lieber Gott, ich danke dir" (1982; text: Marianne Schmidt; EG 645)
- "Vertrauen wagen" (1983; EG 607)
- "Du bist heilig, du bringst Heil" (1991; melody: Per Harling; GL 859)
- "Ich sing dir mein Lied" (1994; melody from Brazil)
- "Ich sing für dich" (2011)
- "Jeder Mensch braucht einen Engel" (2008)
- "Mitten am Tag" (2008; text: Eugen Eckert)
