= Solang es Menschen gibt auf Erden =

1973 song

- Christian hymn
- Written: 1959, 1966, 1972
- Text: by Dieter Trautwein translating Huub Oosterhuis
- Language: German
- Based on: Matthew 6:26–30
- Meter: 9 8 9 8
- Melody: by Tera de Marez Oyens
- Composed: 1959
- Published: 1975

"Solang es Menschen gibt auf Erden" (As long as there are people on Earth) is a Christian hymn with German text by Dieter Trautwein, translating a 1959 Dutch hymn by Huub Oosterhuis, "Zolang er mensen zijn op aarde". The song, of the genre Neues Geistliches Lied (NGL), is part of German hymnals and songbooks.

== History ==
Oosterhuis wrote the text in Dutch, "Zolang er mensen zijn op aarde" in 1959, when he was a priest for students. The melody was composed by Tera de Marez Oyens the same year. Dieter Trautwein's translation from 1966, revised in 1972, was included in the German Catholic hymnal Gotteslob as GL 425, in the section "Leben in Gott - Vertrauen und Trost" (Life in God – trust and consolation). It was also printed in the Protestant hymnal of 1995 Evangelisches Gesangbuch, as EG 427. The song is part of many songbooks.

== Text, theme and music ==
The text is in five stanzas of four lines each which rhyme in Dutch, but not in the translation. It is based on Matthew 6:26–30, about God's care for creations as small as birds and flowers. It begins with thanks to God, who is addressed as a personal "du" (You), for having given life to people and fruits. It alludes to the promise from Genesis 8:22: "While the earth remaineth, seedtime and harvest, and cold and heat, and summer and winter, and day and night shall not cease." God has nourished birds and made flowers beautiful, as the third stanza says. The second stanza reminds of God's word calling for peace ("solang dein Wort zum Frieden ruft"). The fourth stanza addresses God as Light and giver of life, with his Son the bread uniting the believers. The final stanza calls all who owe their life to God to stay in communication.

The melody has been described as simple (schlicht), with a forward-moving steady rhythm. All four short lines are similar. Its irregular dancing beat has been compared to a tango.

The song has been used in the context of preservation of natural environment and peace movement, because the "solang" (as long), often repeated in the text, is a reminder that the state of both the environment and peace are fragile.
