= Du bist heilig, du bringst Heil =

- Christian hymn
- English: You are holy, you bring salvation
- Occasion: Sanctus
- Written: 1986
- Text: by Fritz Baltruweit
- Language: German
- Melody: by Per Harling
- Composed: 1985
- Published: 2013

"Du bist heilig, du bringst Heil" (You are holy, you bring salvation) is a Christian hymn in German about holiness. The lyrics were written in 1986 by Fritz Baltruweit as a translation of a Swedish hymn by Per Harling. The song, a canon for two parts, appeared in the 2013 Catholic hymnal Gotteslob and in many other hymnals and songbooks.

== History ==
The lyrics of "Du bist heilig, du bringst Heil" were written in 1986 by Fritz Baltruweit who translated a 1985 Swedish hymn by Per Harling, a Swedish pastor who had written text and music, departing from the Sanctus of the Christian liturgy. His text addresses God as holy, but concludes that humans are also holy, as parts of creation and history. It is sung as a canon for two parts. The song was included in several regional sections of the Catholic hymnal in German Gotteslob in 2013, such as in the Diocese of Mainz as GL 848, and in the Diocese of Münster as GL 853. It is also contained in many songbooks.
