= Evangelical Church Conference =

The Evangelical Church Conference (German: Deutscher Evangelischer Kirchentag) was a convention of delegates from the different Protestant denominations in Germany and Austria.

The conference originated in 1848, when the general desire for political unity made itself felt in the ecclesiastical sphere as well. A preliminary meeting was held at Sandhof near Frankfurt in June of that year, and on September 21 some five hundred delegates representing the Lutheran, the Reformed, the United Protestant regional and state churches and the Moravian church assembled at Wittenberg.

The gathering was known as Deutscher Evangelischer Kirchentag (German Protestant church diet), and, while leaving each denomination free in respect of constitution, ritual, doctrine and attitude towards the state, agreed to act unitedly in bearing witness against the non-evangelical churches and in defending the rights and liberties of the churches in the federation. The organization thus closely resembles that of the Free Church Federation in England.

The movement exercised considerable influence during the middle of the 19th century, convening fifteen times until 1871. Though no Kirchentag, in such a form, has been convened since then, its place has been taken by the Kongress für innere Mission, which held annual meetings in different towns. Since 1852 there was also a biennial conference of the executive boards of the evangelical churches held at Eisenach (German: Deutsche Evangelische Kirchenkonferenz der Kirchenregierungen; i.e. German Protestant Church Conference of the church governing bodies, more colloquially Eisenacher Konferenz) to discuss matters of general interest. Its decisions had no legislative force.

The Eisenach Conference was replaced by the German Evangelical Church Confederation, founded in 1922. The idea of the Evangelical Church Conferences, but based on a much broader foundation convening clergy and laymen, was revived in 1949 under the same German name, the present-day German Evangelical Church Assembly.
