= Dieter Trautwein =

German theologian

- Born: 30 July 1928; Holzhausen am Hünstein
- Died: 9 November 2002 (aged 74)
- Occupations: Theologian; Poet; Hymnwriter
- Organizations: Frankfurter Bibelgesellschaft; Deutscher Evangelischer Kirchentag
- Awards: Bartholomäus-Medaille; Bundesverdienstkreuz; Hedwig-Burgheim-Medaille

Dieter Trautwein (30 July 1928 – 9 November 2002) was a German Protestant theologian and writer of numerous Christian hymns of the genre Neues Geistliches Lied (NGL).

== Biography ==
Born in Holzhausen am Hünstein (today Dautphetal), Trautwein studied theology in Marburg, Mainz and Heidelberg. After several postings as a vicar in Königstein, Limburg and Bad Nauheim, he served from 1963 to 1970 in positions involving him with the training of new ministers in Frankfurt am Main. In 1969 the Synod of the Evangelical Church in Hesse and Nassau appointed him as provost for Frankfurt. He would continue in this position until 1988. He received his Doctorate of Theology in 1971 from the University of Tübingen with a dissertation dealing with the changing form of worship.

After the end of his term as provost, Trautwein became the chairman and manager of the Frankfurter Bibelgesellschaft. He played a leading role in the planning and construction of the Bibelmuseum which opened after his death in 2003 on the Museumsufer.

He was for a long time a member of the presidum of the Deutscher Evangelischer Kirchentag and chairman of the worship committee of the 6th Conference of the World Council of Churches in Vancouver in 1983. During his time as provost two Kirchentage took place in Frankfort (in 1975 and 1987), which he worked tirelessly to organize. He was known throughout the ecumenical movement as a vocal critic of apartheid in South Africa, accompanied by his wife Ursula.

Dieter Trautwein was also known to the public for his work in modernizing Christian music and worship in the Evangelical Church in Germany. As editor of hymn collections he brought to German liturgy works from churches around the world and networked with the ecumenical movement to bring German music to the world stage.

Trautwein received numerous rewards and distinctions for his work, most notably receiving honours from the civic government of Frankfort and being the first Protestant to receive Bartholomäus-Medaille bestowed by the Catholic Church in Frankfurt in 1988, receiving the Bundesverdienstkreuz in 1989 and in 1990 receiving the Hedwig-Burgheim-Medaille from the city of Gießen for his work in promoting service, tolerance and understanding between people.

== Works ==
Trautwein published 220 hymns of the genre Neues Geistliches Lied (NGL), half of which he had composed and written himself and the other half being translated by him into German from countries and churches around the world. Many of his hymns are present in the current German Protestant hymnal Evangelisches Gesangbuch.

=== Hymns ===
- "Weil Gott in tiefster Nacht erschienen", 1963
- "Solang es Menschen gibt auf Erden", 1966 (translation)
- "Komm, Herr, segne uns, dass wir uns nicht trennen", 1978

=== Other works ===
- Komm Herr segne uns. Lebenserinnerungen. Lembeck, Frankfurt am Main 2003, ISBN 3-87476-437-0
- Oskar Schindler – immer neue Geschichten. Societäts-Verlag, Frankfurt am Main 2002, ISBN 3-7973-0734-9

=== Works in editing ===
- Basler Mission, Evangelisches Missionswerk in Deutschland (ed.): Thuma Mina. Internationales Ökumenisches Liederbuch. by Dieter Trautwein, Beatrice Aebi, Johanna Linz and Dietrich Werner. Strube, Munich, and Basileia, Basel 1995, ISBN 3-921946-17-4 (Strube)/ISBN 3-85555-045-X (Basileia)
- World Council of Churches (ed.): Cantate Domino. Ein ökumenisches Gesangbuch. Kassel, Bärenreiter 1983, ISBN 3-7618-4994-X
