= Detlev Jöcker =

German composer, singer, and songwriter

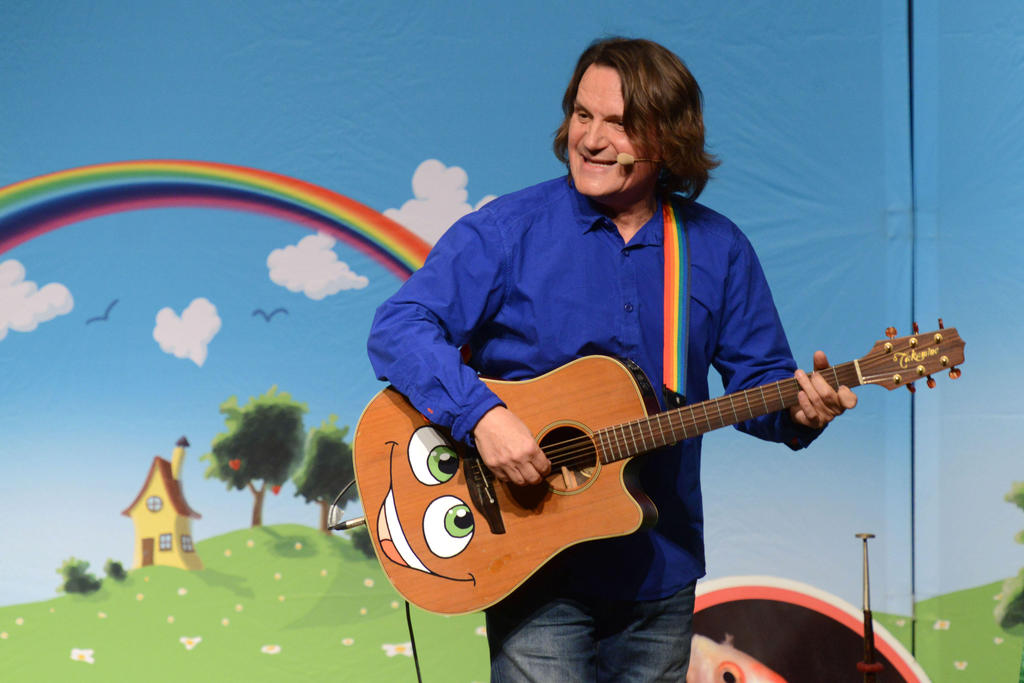
- Detlev Jöcker in 2017
- Born: 5 October 1951 (age 75); Münster, West Germany
- Education: University of Münster
- Occupations: Guitarist; Composer; Music publisher
- Organization: Menschenkinder Verlag
- Awards: Kind-Award; Hannelore Kohl Medal
- Website: www.detlevjoecker.de

Detlev Jöcker (born 5 October 1951) is a German composer, singer and songwriter, focused on songs with movement for small children. He has sold more than 13 million albums. He founded the publishing house Menschenkinder Verlag.

== Life and work ==
Born in Münster, Jöcker studied music in his home town from age 15, as a highly gifted young musician (hochbegabter Nachwuchsmusiker): classical guitar, flute and piano. He belonged to the Gesangsorchester of Peter Janssens from 1975 to 1979. During a tour of the musical Ave Eva, he converted to Christianity. He founded the group Menschenkinder in 1982. He worked in Münster from 1986 as composer and music publisher and was widely active giving concerts and seminars, performing often at Kirchentag events. He has conducted singing seminars for preschool and primary school educators and parents. He invented songs for his young son Daniel, called "Lern-, Spiel- und Bewegungslieder" (learning / playing / movement songs). Many of them became popular, such as "1,2,3 im Sauseschritt" (1979), "Dicke, rote Kerzen", "Sei gegrüßt, lieber Nikolaus" and "Das Flummilied", and he came to be regarded as a pioneer of early education in music with movement. After the death of his wife, he raised two children as a single parent.

Jöcker was awarded nine Gold records and seven Platinum records from the Bundesverband Musikindustrie for more than 13 million recordings sold. He has toured internationally as "Botschafter des deutschen Kinderliedes" (ambassador of German children's songs) by the Goethe Institute. He met Shimon Peres in 2005, and became ambassador of the Peres Foundation. He composed for broadcast for children and audio plays. Jöcker founded the publishing house Menschenkinder Verlag in 1987, which published from 1980 to 2017 around 500 recordings and songbooks for children and families. From 2015, marketing and distribution have been performed by SONY. Jöcker has been a member of the ecumenical group of authors and composers Werkgemeinschaft Musik, now Textautoren- und Komponistengruppe TAKT.

Jöcker was awarded the Kind-Award in 2006 from Kinderlachen. He and his work became part of a 2006 exhibition at the Haus der Geschichte in Bonn entitled "Melodien für Millionen: Das Jahrhundert des Schlagers" (melodies for millions: the century of Schlager), alongside Udo Jürgens and Caterina Valente among others.

== Works ==
- "Mache den Furchtsamen Mut" (Deutscher Evangelischer Kirchentag Hamburg 1981, text: Dieter Frettlöh)
- "Das wünsch ich sehr", text: Kurt Rose (1984)
- "Wo einer dem andern neu vertraut" (melody 1986, Evangelisches Gesangbuch Württemberg EG 551)
- "Ein Licht geht uns auf in der Dunkelheit" (melody 1986, EG Württemberg 555; EG Hessen 557)
- "Du hast uns deine Welt geschenkt" (text: Rolf Krenzer)
- "Gott, dein guter Segen" (melody 2009)
