= In der Mitte der Nacht =

Christian hymn

- Christian hymn
- English: In the middle of the night
- Written: 1978
- Text: Sybille Fritsch
- Language: German
- Melody: Fritz Baltruweit
- Composed: 1978

"In der Mitte der Nacht" (Where people forget themselves) is a Christian hymn in German, with text written in 1978 by Sybille Fritsch and with music by Fritz Baltruweit. The hymn of the genre Neues Geistliches Lied (NGL) appears in regional sections of the 2013 hymnal Gotteslob, and in other songbooks.

== History ==
Sybille Fritsch, a theologian, writer and poet, wrote the text of "In der Mitte der Nacht" in 1978. Fritz Baltruweit, a Protestant theologian and prolific writer of new hymns, composed the music. The hymn is part of regional sections of the German common Catholic hymnal Gotteslob, such as in Limburg as GL 831. The hymn is also contained in other songbooks. The song is part of a CD by the composer, Hellwache Herzen.

== Text and theme ==
The song begins with the refrain followed by three verses. The refrain expresses that the middle of the night is the beginning of a new day, and that hope is blossoming from its dark earth, using imagery from nature for situations in life. The three verses speak of light, each one beginning and ending with the same short line, first "Ich will Licht sehn", the singer in the first person wanting to see light even in darkness and loneliness, then "Ich will Licht sein", the person wanting to be light, finding the right words, finally "Lass uns Licht sehn", widening the view to a group.
