= Rolf Schweizer =

- Born: 14 March 1936; Mundingen
- Died: 6 June 2016 (aged 80); Selb
- Education: Evangelisches Kirchenmusikalisches Institut Heidelberg
- Occupations: Composer; Church music director
- Awards: Honorary citizen of Pforzheim

Rolf Schweizer (14 March 1936 – 6 June 2016) was a German composer, choirmaster and church music director, who was based primarily at Pforzheim. Schweizer was part of the movement Neues Geistliches Lied, and his compositions, several of which appear in the Protestant hymnal Evangelisches Gesangbuch (EG), were heavily influenced by contemporary secular music, especially jazz.

== Life ==
Schweizer was born in Mundingen (now a suburb of Emmendingen). His first musical instruction was as a member of the local brass band. He studied Protestant church music at the Evangelische Kirchenmusikalischen Institut in Heidelberg, with Wolfgang Fortner, Hermann Meinhard Poppen, Wolfgang Dallmann, Heinz Werner Zimmermann and others.

From 1956 to 1966 he was choirmaster of St John's in Mannheim. In 1966 he became district choirmaster of Pforzheim, a position he retained until his retirement. In 1969 he was promoted to Kirchenmusikdirektor (church music director), and in 1975 he became state choirmaster (Landeskantor) for Mittelbaden. In 1980 Schweizer turned down the role of Professor of church music at Erlangen, but he was granted the title of Professor by the Minister-President of Baden-Württemberg, Lothar Späth. He was well known for his pedagogical work well beyond his own region.

The city of Pforzheim granted Schweizer its honour ring in 1991 and honorary citizenship in 1998, for his more than 35 years of service in the field of church music. He retired in 2010 and lived in south Baden with his wife, Frohmut. The couple has three daughters. One of the daughters, Constanze Schweizer-Elser is currently the church choir director at Selb in north-eastern Bavaria. and the second daughter, Felicitas Schewizer-Kostner, a violin player, lives in Ortisei, north Italy, Ladin region. http://www.chor.it/eg/biography.htm

== Music ==
Schweizer composed religious music for songs, brass bands and especially for children's choirs as well as large choir, orchestra and organ pieces. He belonged to the contemporary worship music movement and was heavily influenced by 1960s pop music, especially jazz. Since 1961, his various musical settings of new sacred songs have been published in hymnals (including EG / EM), pamphlets, music books, choir and band arrangements by the publishers Strube-Verlag (Munich), Hänssler (Stuttgart), Verlag Dohr (Bergheim-Ahe), Verlag Neue Musik, the Deutscher Evangelischer Kirchentag (Fulda) and Carus-Verlag. Well-known songs include O Herr, mach mich zu einem Werkzeug deines Friedens (O Lord, make me a tool of Thy peace) Das ist ein köstlich ding, dem herren danken (It is good to praise the Lord), and Singet dem Herrn ein neues Lied (Sing a new song to the Lord, since he does wonders).

His recordings with the Motettenchor Pforzheim include works by Johann Sebastian Bach, such as choral movements from cantatas with the orchestra L'arpa festante, the motets, the Magnificat for Christmas Vespers, BWV 243a, the St Matthew Passion, Christmas Oratorio and Easter Oratorio.

Schweizer wrote extensively on church music, stressing its therapeutic value, especially with respect to youth. He also argued that church music should engage with contemporary trends in secular music, such as jazz, in order to maintain its vibrancy. A compilation of his writings, entitled Ritual und Aufbrach was published in 1997 in honour of his 60th birthday.

== Horntage ==
Since 2000, Rolf Schweizer has been employed as the leader of the Internationales Schwarzwälder Hornorchester (International Black Forest Horn Orchestra), which has performed several works composed by Schweizer himself at the Internationalen Schwarzwälder Horntage (International Black Forest Horn Days). Since 2006, these Horntage have served as masterclasses for brass players, organised by Schweizer. The event is held in the BDB Music Academy in Staufen under the professional leadership of Peter Arnold.

== Works ==
Hymns

- O Herr, mach mich zu einem Werkzeug deines Friedens (1962; text by Francis of Assisi) EG 416
- Singet dem Herrn ein neues Lied, denn Er tut Wunder (1963; text: Psalm 98.1) EG 287
- Das ist ein köstlich Ding, dem Herren danken (1966; text: Psalm 92.2-6) EG 285
- Siehe, das ist Gottes Lamm (Kanon) (1972; text: Joshua 1.29) EG 190,4/714
- In Euren Wänden seid ihr zuhause (1972; text: Wolfgang Fietkau, 1972)
- Bevor die Sonne sinkt (1974; text: Christa Weiss/Kurt Rommel, 1965) EG 491
- Einer trage des andren Last (1976; text and melody)
- Der Frieden Kind, der Frieden (1980; Text: Hildegard Wohlgemuth, 1980)
- Damit aus Fremden Freunde werden (1982; text and melody) EG 657
- Seht, das Brot, das wir hier teilen (1983; text: Lothar Zenetti, 1972) EG 226
- Lied von der verborgenen Stadt (1986; text: Arnim Juhre, 1986)
- Tischlied zum Sabbat (2001; text: Susanne Brandt, 2001)
- Gast sein auf Erden (2001; text: Arnim Juhre 2001)

Orchestra & choir pieces

- Einer trage des andern Last; Fidula-Verlag (1977)
- Die zwei Blinden; Hänssler-Verlag (1978)
- Lied der Sternsinger; Hänssler-Verlag (1978)
- Das Sorgen; Hänssler-Verlag (1979)
- Drei Kantaten für Männerchor; Verlag Singende Gemeinde (1982)
- Psalm in blue; Strube-Verlag (1987)
- Geistliche Spruchkanons; Fidula-Verlag (1989)
- Sinfonietta ’90; Strube-Verlag (1990)
- Sonata sacra; Pro Organo (1991)
- Ludi organi; Pro Organo (1992)
- Sechs geistliche Songs und neue Lieder; Strube-Verlag (1992)
- Sabbath der Schöpfung; Strube-Verlag (1993)
- Sonata da chiesa Nr. 2; Edition Walhall (1994)
- Psalmkantate „Lebendige Steine“, Edition Musica Rinata (1995)
- Musik zu Psalm 104; Strube-Verlag (1995)
- Drei Spiritual-Impressionen; Strube-Verlag (1995)
- Singendes Gottesvolk; Strube-Verlag (1996)
- Hymnus I–III; 1988/1989/2007, Dohr Verlag (1997)
- Ruf-Partita zu Jesaja 58; Strube-Verlag (1997)
- Sonata festivo; Strube-Verlag (1997)
- Psalm in Swing; Strube-Verlag (1997)
- Das vierfache Ackerfeld; Carus-Verlag (1998)
- Klang des Lebens; (Text: Hartmut Handt);'Strube-Verlag (1998)
- Salz der Erde, Licht der Welt; Strube-Verlag (1999)
- Europäische Weihnachtslieder-Suite; Strube-Verlag (1999)
- Klangbilder der Hoffnung Schweizer; Strube-Verlag (1999)
- Ihr seid die lebendigen Steine; Edition Musica Rinata (2000)
- Jona, geh’ nach Ninive; Strube-Verlag (2001)
- Ein Lied klingt durch die Welt; Möseler (2002)
- Psalmsprüche; Bärenreiter-Verlag 2003
- Präludium in swing; Strube-Verlag (2004)
- Sinfonietta concertante; Strube-Verlag (2004)
