= Tera de Marez Oyens =

Dutch composer

Tera de Marez Oyens (5 August 1932 – 29 August 1996) was a Dutch composer.

De Marez Oyens was born in Velsen as Woltera Gerharda Wansink. She studied at the Conservatorium van Amsterdam with a major in piano, studying the instrument with Jan Odé, and graduated in 1953 (Metzelaar n.d.). Here, her talent for composition was discovered as she wrote her first pieces. These included chamber music and song cycles. After that she came in contact with youth groups, for whom she also wrote individual pieces.

She then became the cantor of the Reformed church community of Hilversum. Because of this she was very busy with church music. She wrote 14 melodies for the church songbooks that appeared in 1973. The lyrics for these songs were supplied by, among others, Muus Jacobse, Willem Barnard and Ad den Besten, whom she knew personally. She wrote the melody for "Zolang er mensen zijn op aarde" by Huub Oosterhuis.

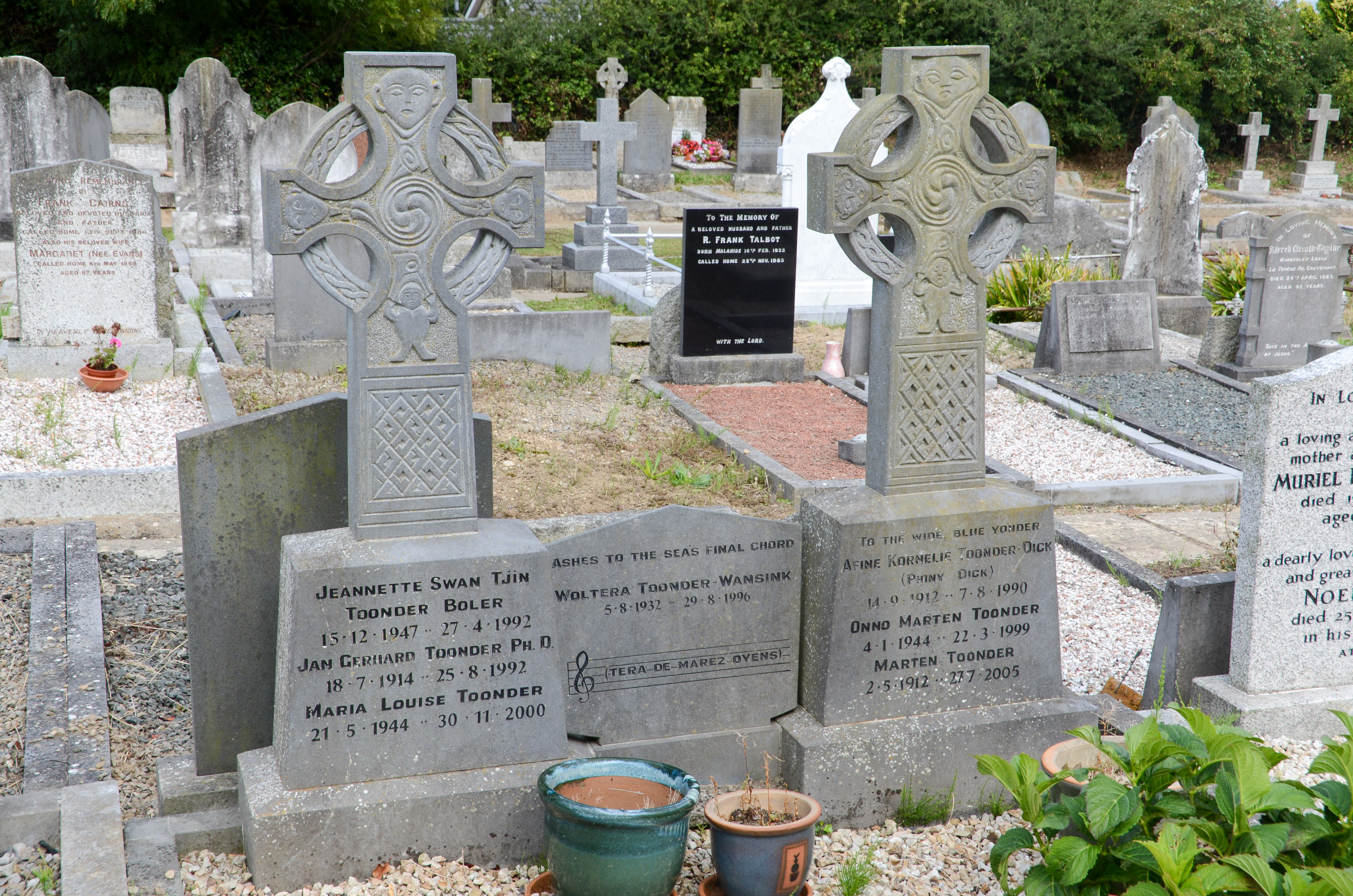
Grave of Tera de Marez Oyens (centre)

In the 1960s she became interested in electronic music, and studied with Gottfried Michael Koenig at the Institute of Sonology in Utrecht (Metzelaar n.d.). Sound and Silence (1971) and Mixed Feelings (1973) are pieces of electronic music she composed, and Pente Sjawoe is an example of a work in which the tone poem plays an important role.

In 1978 she became an instructor at the conservatory in Zwolle, where she taught until 1988 (Metzelaar n.d.). Her lessons focused especially on the development of the student's own style. But she wanted to continue to write her own pieces and after the death of her second husband she became a full-time composer. At that time she wrote The Odyssey of Mr. Good-Evil (1981). In 1988 she contributed pieces to the international cello competition in Scheveningen, and in 1989 she was composer in residence at the Georgia State University in Atlanta.

She wrote over 200 works of music, many commissioned by the Dutch Ministry of Culture and various broadcasting networks. In 1995 she was asked to write a piece (Unison) for the 50th anniversary of the United Nations (Metzelaar n.d.).

She had been married to Gerrit de Marez Oyens and Menachem Arnoni. Despite the fact that she had become seriously ill, in 1996 Tera de Marez Oyens married the renowned cartoonist Marten Toonder. She died on 29 August of that year in Hilversum (Metzelaar n.d.).

== Sources ==
- Metzelaar, Helen. n.d. "Marez Oyens, Tera de [née Wansink]". Grove Music Online, edited by Deane Root (accessed 17 September 2014) (subscription required).
