= M. S. Arnoni =

Political activist, journalist

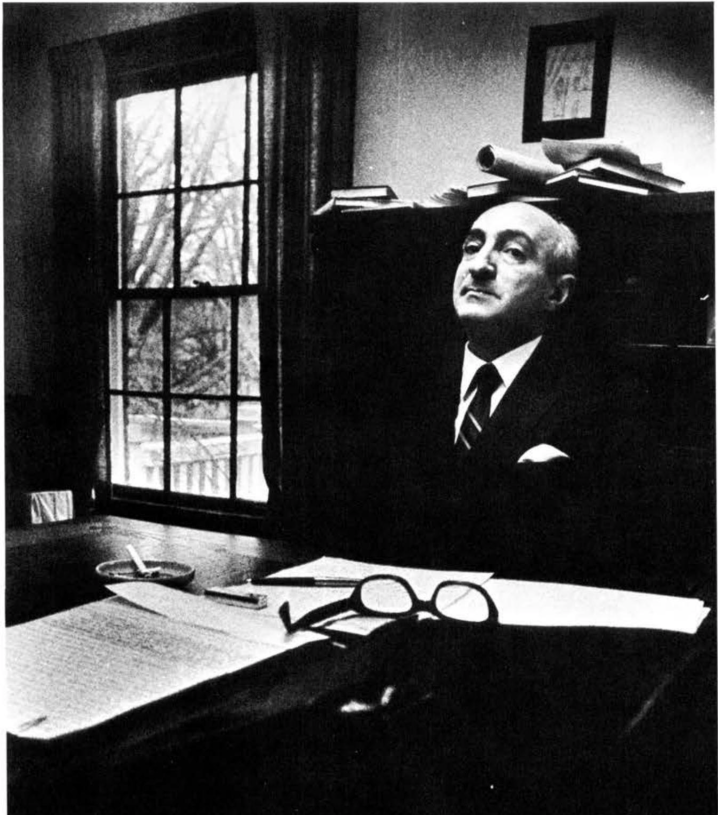
- M. S. Arnoni in 1971
- Born: Menachem Samuel Arnoni; February 1, 1922; Łódź, Poland
- Died: February 10, 1985 (aged 63); Los Angeles, California, U.S.
- Education: University of California, Los Angeles
- Occupations: Writer, philosopher, political activist

Menachem Samuel Arnoni (February 1, 1922 – February 10, 1985), known as M. S. Arnoni, was a political activist, journalist, and philosopher. He was best known for editing and creating the left-wing magazine The Minority of One.

== Early life ==
Arnoni was born in Łódź, Poland in 1922. He was born as Meniek Sztajer, the son of an engineer. In 1944, Arnoni and his family were held in the Łódź Ghetto. In August of that year, he was sent to Auschwitz before he was liberated in May 1945. He later wrote a memoir about his time in the Łódź Ghetto and Auschwitz, called Moeder was niet thuis voor haar begrafenis (Mother was Not at Home for Her Funeral).

== Political activism and journalism ==
Arnoni moved to the United States in 1954. In 1959, Arnoni founded the monthly magazine The Minority of One, which he described as an independent journal "dedicated to the eradication of all restrictions on thought." The magazine's Board of Sponsors included Bertrand Russell, Albert Schweitzer, and Linus Pauling. It was known for its articles on the peace movement, civil liberties, and criticism of both American and Soviet foreign policy. By 1967, the magazine had a circulation of 26,000. Oleg Kalugin alleged that Arnoni unknowingly accepted articles on foreign policy for publication that had been prepared by the KGB.

Arnoni was one of the first journalists to criticize the Vietnam War. In 1965 he called for the organization of a war crimes tribunal, modeled on the Nuremberg trials, to judge American war crimes in Vietnam. Arnoni proposed this idea to Bertrand Russell who initially rejected the idea but Russell later used it as inspiration for his International War Crimes Tribunal in 1966. In May 1965, Arnoni gave a speech at the 35-hour protest at University of California, Berkeley arranged by the Vietnam Day Committee, where he advocated for volunteers to join the North Vietnamese and fight against the American army. At another anti-war protest in October 1965, he wore his concentration camp uniform and told the crowd that the victims of the Holocaust would implore them "not to be silent in the face of the genocidal atrocities committed on the people of Vietnam". He engaged in a debate with Sidney Hook about the war, through a series of letters to the editor, published in the September 25 and October 23, 1967, editions of The New Leader.

The Minority of One was also critical of the Warren Commission and published articles by prominent critics of the government's investigation into the Kennedy assassination. In March 1964 Arnoni published an advertisement in The New York Times in the form of an open letter to Earl Warren, arguing that the assassination was the result of a conspiracy, since "whenever a head of state is assassinated there is a strong likelihood of a political plot behind the act".

Arnoni was critical of negative leftist attitudes towards Israel, arguing in support of the country in his article, later expanded into a book, Rights and Wrongs in the Arab-Israeli Conflict. In 1969, in response to his frustrations with these critics, as well as American involvement in the Vietnam War, Arnoni left the United States and moved to Israel. In 1971 he moved to the Netherlands, where he published the newsletter In Search of Facts, Ideas, and Challenges.

== Personal life ==
Arnoni married Dutch composer Tera de Marez Oyens in 1976. He was an Esperantist and a member of the Esperanto League for North America. He was the namesake of the M.S. Arnoni Award, presented by the magazine Jewish Currents.
