= Komm, Herr, segne uns =

1978 German Christian hymn

- Christian hymn
- Written: 1978
- Text: by Dieter Trautwein
- Language: German
- Melody: by Trautwein

"Komm, Herr, segne uns" (Come, Lord, bless us) is a Christian hymn in German in four stanzas with text and music by the Protestant pastor Dieter Trautwein, written in 1978. It is a hymn of the genre Neues Geistliches Lied (NGL), appearing in German hymnals of different denominations, including the Protestant Evangelisches Gesangbuch and the Catholic Gotteslob. It begins with the line "Komm Herr, segne uns, dass wir uns nicht trennen" (Come, Lord, bless us, that we do not separate).

== History ==
The Protestant pastor Dieter Trautwein wrote the German text and the music of "Komm, Herr, segne uns" in 1978. He had studied theology after World War II, including at Ökumenische Hochschule Bossey/Geneva, with an focus on ecumenism. He became pastor for young people (Jugendpfarrer) in Frankfurt in 1963, where his Catholic colleague was Lothar Zenetti.

"Komm, Herr, segne uns" is a hymn of the genre Neues Geistliches Lied (NGL) in four stanzas. It was included in German hymnals of different denominations. In the Protestant hymnal Evangelisches Gesangbuch, it is EG 170. In the Catholic hymnal Gotteslob, it appears as GL 451.

== Text and music ==
The song is in four stanzas, of eight lines each. It begins "Komm Herr, segne uns, dass wir uns nicht trennen", requesting blessing to counter separation. The second stanza deals with fair sharing in a community. The third stanza is focused on peace as a work in progress, to which the individual singer can contribute. Finally, the first stanza is repeated, ending "Lachen oder Weinen wird gesegnet sein" (Laughter and crying will be blessed).

Kurt Grahl composed a motet setting the hymn for four-part choir, congregational singing and organ. Trautwein published an autobiography in 2003, using the beginning of the hymn as the title, Komm Herr segne uns, subtitled Lebensfelder im 20. Jahrhundert (Fields of life in the 20th century).
