= Barcelona Papyrus =

4th century papyrus from Egypt

The Barcelona Papyrus is a 4th-century papyrus codex, coming from Egypt and cataloged as P.Monts.Roca inv.128-178. It is the oldest liturgical manuscript containing a complete anaphora.

This codex is for the main part conserved in the Abbey of Montserrat and it includes seven pages (154b-157b) of prayers in Greek with a complete anaphora, a related prayer to be said after receiving the Eucharist, two prayers for the sick and an acrostic hymn perhaps of baptismal type. The Codex also includes a few Latin texts and a long list of Greek words.

== Anaphora ==
The anaphora included in the Barcelona Papyrus was first published by Ramón Roca-Puig in 1994, and the critical edition was issued by M. Zheltov in 2008. This anaphora, which could be related to some Pachomian monastery, was a form well known in Egypt before about the 7th century: in fact other two fragments of it have been recovered: the so-called Louvain Coptic Papyrus, a Coptic version dating from the 6th century, and the Greek fragment PVindob. G 41043.

The anaphora of Barcelona includes all the typical elements of a developed anaphora, with the particularity that its epiclesis is placed before the Words of Institution, as in the Roman Canon and in the Anaphora of Deir Balyzeh. The content of this anaphora, which includes no Intercessions, is the following:

- Opening Dialogue,
- Preface which praises the Father for the creation of heaven and earth, the sea and all that is in them (quoting Psalm 146:6 as usual in the Alexandrine anaphoras), and which next praises also Christ,
- Sanctus, without the Benedictus as usual in early Egypt and introduced by a Pre-Sanctus,
- Post-Sanctus centered on Christ,
- Oblation, offering the bread and the cup,
- an Epiclesis directed to the Holy Spirit, with an explicit request to change the bread and wine into the Body and Blood of Christ,
- a short Institution narrative followed by the Anamnesis,
- a petition for worthy Communion which could be considered as a second or implicit epiclesis,
- final Doxology.

The liturgical scholar Paul F. Bradshaw suggests that this anaphora reached its final form in the 4th century, adding the Sanctus, as well as the Epiclesis and the Institution narrative, to a more ancient material, which could more likely derive from West Syria rather than from Egypt.

== Thanksgiving prayer ==
The thanksgiving prayer, also included in the Barcelona Papyrus, is a prayer to be said after having received the Eucharist and it is shaped on the basis of the last part of the anaphora. This simple pairing of the anaphora with the thanksgiving prayer reminds the same early structure found in chapters 9/10 of the Didache and in the chapters 25/26 of the 7th books of the Apostolic Constitutions.

== Prayers for the sick ==
Among the prayers found in the Barcelona Papyrus, there are two texts that probably refer to the sacrament of the Anointing of the Sick: a prayer associated to the laying on of hands in order that the "spirit of illness" leave the faithful, and on another prayer for the consecration of the oil for the sick, which alternatively could refer to the consecration of the oil of catechumens.
