= Gott gab uns Atem =

Christian hymn

- Christian hymn
- Written: 1982
- Text: by Eckart Bücken
- Language: German
- Melody: by Fritz Baltruweit
- Composed: 1982

"Gott gab uns Atem" (God gave us breath) is a 1982 Christian hymn in German, with text by Eckart Bücken and music by Fritz Baltruweit. It appears in major modern Protestant and Catholic hymnals in German.

== History ==
"Gott gab uns Atem" was written in 1982 with text by Eckart Bücken and music by the singer-songwriter Fritz Baltruweit. "Gott gab uns Atem" is contained in the German Catholic hymnal Gotteslob of 2013 as GL 468. The hymn is part of the Protestant hymnal Evangelisches Gesangbuch as EG 432. It is also contained in other hymnals and songbooks.

== Text and theme ==
"Gott gab uns Atem" is in three stanzas of four lines each. The first lines of all stanzas point at something that God gave: breath, ears, hands, and their purpose: to live, to understand, to act.
