= Mittelbaden =

Region

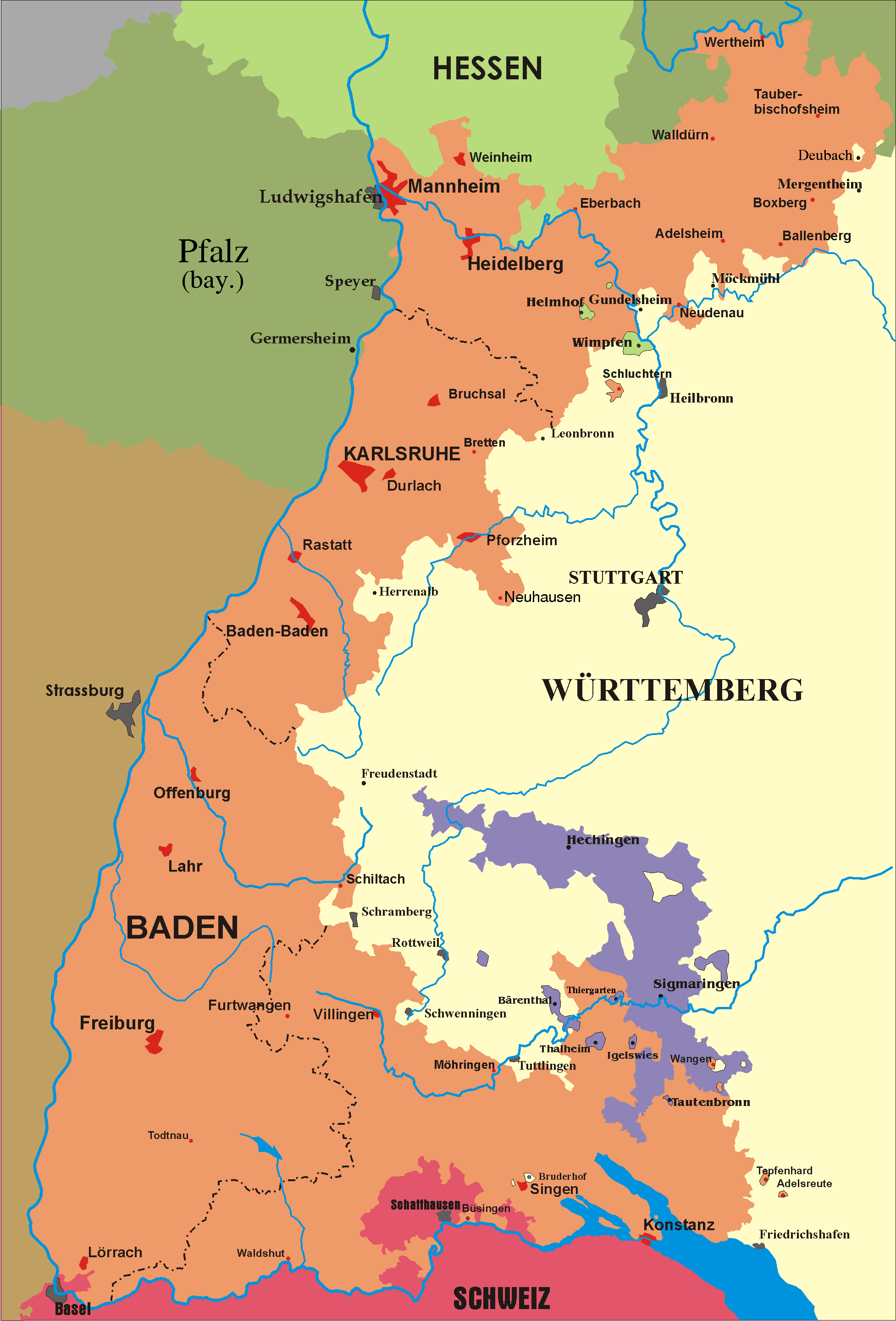
The former state of Baden. The term "Middle Baden" is common for the central part.

Mittelbaden (German: "Middle Baden") is a vaguely defined region in the Baden part of Baden-Württemberg. It is customarily used for the region containing the districts of Rastatt, Baden-Baden, and Ortenaukreis. Before the district reform of 1973 it contained the former districts of Baden-Baden, Bühl, Kehl, Rastatt, Offenburg and Wolfach. The region includes the historic counties (Gaue) of Ufgau and Ortenau.

In a wider sense, Mittelbaden is used to refer to the area between northern Baden (Mannheim and Rhein-Neckar) and southern Baden (Emmendingen, Freiburg, Lörrach and Konstanz). In this sense, the term can include the regions of Karlsruhe, Pforzheim and Enzkreis.

Unlike Südbaden and Nordbaden, Mittelbaden has never been an official term for a district or area.

== Examples of use ==
Some examples of the use of the term Mittelbaden:

- Baden-Baden is completely surrounded by Rastatt district and both districts are tightly linked to one another. From 1924 to 1939, Baden-Baden belonged to the Amtsbezirk of Rastatt; in the 1973 district reform, the city became an independent district - by far the smallest civic district in Baden-Württemberg. Both the city council of Baden-Baden and the district council of Rastatt use the term Mittelbaden for institutions which cross district boundaries.
  - The Klinikum Mittelbaden gGmbH is a collaborative healthcare service of Rastatt and Baden-Baden districts.
  - The Integrierte Leitstelle Mittelbaden is the Public-safety answering point for ambulance and fire services in the districts.
  - The Medienzentrum Mittelbaden supplies media and advice to all schools in Baden-Baden and Rastatt.
  - The city of Baden-Baden, the communities of Rastatt and local businesses, established the Interessengemeinschaft „Wirtschaftsregion Mittelbaden“ ("Mittelbaden Industrial Area" Interest group) to encourage regional business ties, in 2012.
- The VR-Bank in Mittelbaden eG which was formed from several co-operative banks in Rastatt, with its headquarters in Iffezheim and branches from Sinzheim in the south to Steinmauern in the north.
- E-Werk Mittelbaden, an electricity supply company in Ortenau, has included "Mittelbaden" in its name since it was formed by the merger of Lahrer E-Werk and Offenburger E-Werk in 1922.
- The Südwestdeutsche Verkehrs-Aktiengesellschaft (SW German Transport Organisation) based in Lahr has a Verkehrsbetrieb Mittelbaden-Schwarzach (Mittelbaden-Schwarzach Transport Company), which serves Rastatt and Ortenau.
- Newspapers in Ortenau are published by the Mittelbadische Presse.
- The business area of the building co-operative Familienheim Mittelbaden, based in Achern, includes Ortenau and the surrounding regions.
- The Obstgroßmarkt Mittelbaden (Mittelbaden Fruit Wholesale Market) in Oberkirch was created in 1996 by the merger of several local fruit wholesale co-operatives.
- The Baden Football Association has a Landesliga Mittelbaden (Mittelbaden State League), including Karlsruhe, Enzkreis and Pforzheim. Baden-Baden and Rastatt on the other hand belong to the South Baden Football Association.
- The Region Mittelbaden of the DGB includes Karlsruhe as well as Baden-Baden and Rastatt.
- The Historical Organisation for Mittelbaden produces an annual Die Ortenau. It has local groups in other parts of Baden. Rastatt is included in the northern part of its territory, but it stretches south to Ettenheim and Triberg.
