= Sacramentary of Serapion of Thmuis =

Early Christian prayer book

The Sacramentary of Serapion of Thmuis (fl. c. 330–360) is a prayer-book or sacramentary (euchologion) intended for the use of bishops.

The sacramentary includes the earliest recorded use of the Sanctus.

== Sacramentary ==
This sacramentary, contained in a collection of Egyptian documents in an 11th-century manuscript at the Great Lavra on Mount Athos, was published by A. Dmitrijewskij in 1894, but attracted little attention until independently discovered and published by G. Wobbermin in 1899. It is a celebrant's book, containing thirty prayers belonging to the Divine Liturgy or Mass (19-30, 1-6), baptism (7-11, 15, 16), ordination (12-14), benediction of oil, bread and water (17), and burial (18), omitting the fixed structural formulae of the rites, the parts of the other ministers, and almost all rubrication, except what is implied in the titles of the prayers.

The name of Serapion is prefixed to the anaphora of the Eucharistic celebration (I) and to the group 15-18: but whether this indicates authorship is doubtful; for whereas the whole collection is bound together by certain marks of vocabulary, style and thought, 15-18 have characteristics of their own not shared by the anaphora, while no part of the collection shows special affinities with the current works of Serapion. But his name is at least a symbol of probable date and provenance: the theology, which is orthodox so far as it goes, but conservative, and perhaps glancing at Arianism, shows no sign that the Macedonian question has arisen; the doxologies, of a type abandoned by the orthodox, and by ca. 370 treated by Didymus the Blind of Alexandria as heretical; the apparent presupposition that the population is mainly pagan (1, 20); the exclusive appropriation of the regular Eucharistic observance to Sunday (19; cp. Ath. ap. c. Ar. II), whereas the liturgical observance of Saturday prevailed in Egypt by ca. 380; the terms in which monasticism is referred to together point to ca. 350: the occurrence of official interpreters (25) points to a bilingual Church, i.e. Syria or Egypt; and certain theological phrases (ἀγέννητος, ἐπιδημία, μόνη καθολικὴ ἐκκλησία) characteristic of the old Egyptian creed, and the liturgical characteristics, indicate Egypt; while the petition for rains (23), without reference to the Nile-rising, points to the Delta as distinguished from Upper Egypt. The book is important, therefore, as the earliest liturgical collection on so large a scale, and as belonging to Egypt, where evidence for 4th-century ritual is scanty as compared with Syria.

The rites form a link between those of the Egyptian Church Order (a 3rd- or early 4th-century development of the Hippolytean Canons, which are perhaps Egyptian of ca. 260) and later Egyptian rites marking the stage of development reached in Egypt by ca. 350, while exhibiting characteristics of their own.

1. The Mass has the Egyptian notes—a prayer before the lections, elsewhere unknown in the East; an exceptionally weighty body of intercessions after the catechumens dismissal, followed by a penitential act, probably identical with the ἐξομολόγησις of Can. Hippol. 2, which disappeared in later rites; a setting of the Sanctus found in several Egyptian anaphoras; the close connection of the commemorations of the offerers and of the dead; and the form of the conclusion of the anaphora. The structure of the communion—with a prayer before and prayers of thanksgiving and blessing after—shows that Egypt had already developed the common type, otherwise first evidenced in Syria, ca. 375 (Ap. Const. viii. 13). Among the special characteristics of Serapion are the simplicity of the Sanctus, and of the Institution, which lacks the dramatic additions already found in Ap. Coust.; the interpolation of a passage containing a quotation from Didache 9 between the institutions of the bread and of the chalice; the form of the ἀνάμνησις and the invocation of the Word, not of the Holy Ghost, to effect consecration. That the Lord's Prayer before communion is not referred to may be only because it is a fixed formula belonging to the structure of the rite.
2. The Order of Baptism has a form for the consecration of the water, and a preliminary prayer for the candidates, perhaps alluding to their exorcism; a prayer for steadfastness following the renunciation and the confession of faith; the form of anointing with oil; appropriate prayers preceding and following the act of baptism; and the prayer of confirmation. with imposition of the hand, chrism and crossing. All this corresponds to and fills up the outline of the Church Order and allusions in 4th-century writers, and is in line with later Egyptian rites.
3. Forms of Ordination are provided only for deacons, presbyters and bishops, the orders of divine institution (12). They are concise, but of the normal type. That for deacons (12) commemorates St Stephen, invokes the Holy Ghost, and prays for the gifts qualifying for the diaconate. That for presbyters (13) recalls the Mosaic LXX, invokes the Holy Ghost, and asks for the gifts qualifying for administration, teaching, and the ministry of reconciliation. That for bishops (14) appeals to the mission of our Lord, the election of the apostles, and the apostolic succession, and asks for the Divine Spirit conferred on prophets and patriarchs, that the subject may feed the flock unblamably and without offence continue in his office. The minor orders, interpreters, readers and subdeacons (25) are evidently, as elsewhere in the middle of the 4th century, appointed without sacramental ordination.
4. The use of exorcised or blessed oil, water and bread is fully illustrated by the lives of the fathers of the desert (cp. the Gnostic use, Clem. Al. Excerpta 82). Serapion has a form of benediction of oil and water (5) offered in the mass (like Can. Hippol. and Ch. Ord. for oil), probably for the use of individual offerers. A longer form for all three matters (17) perhaps has in view the general needs of the Church in the visitation of the sick. The occurrence in both prayers of the Name and the commemoration of the Passion, Resurrection, etc., corresponds with early allusions, in Origen and elsewhere, to the usual form of exorcism.
5. For burial of the dead Serapion gives a prayer for the departed and the survivors (18). But the funeral procession is alluded to (ἐκκομιζομένου), and in the mass (I) the particular commemoration of departed persons is provided for. Hence we have the elements of the 4th-century funeral, as we know it in Egypt and elsewhere: a preliminary office (of readings and psalms) to which the prayer belongs, the procession (with psalmody) to the cemetery, the burial and the mass pro domitione.

== Sources and references ==
- Dmitrijewskij in Trudy (Journal of the Eccl. Acad. of Kiev, 1894), No. 2; separately (Kiev, 1894); reviewed by A. Favlov, Ancient Greek: Χρονικὰ Βυζαντινά, romanized: Chronikà Byzantiná, i. 207-213; cp. Byzant. Zeitschr. iv. I (1895), p. 193
- G. Wobbermin in Harnack-Gebhardt, Texte u. Untersuch., new series, ii. 3 b (1899)
- P. Drews, "Über Wobbermins Altchristliche liturgische Stücke aus d. Kirche Ägyptens" in Zeitschr. f. Kirchen-Geschichte, xx. 4 (Oct. 1899, Jan. 1900)
- F. E. Brightman, "The Sacramentary of Serapion of Thmuis" in Journal of Theological Studies, i. and ii. (Oct. 1899, Jan. 1900)
- John Wordsworth, Bishop Sarapion's Prayer-Book (London: SPCK, 1899)
- P. Batiffol in Bulletin de lit. ecclés. p. 69 sqq. (Toulouse, 1899).
