= Sanctus =

Hymn in Christian liturgy

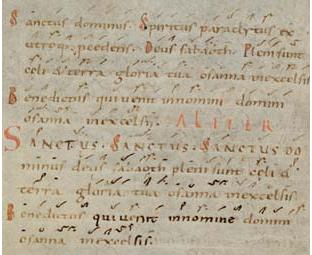
Text of the Sanctus in an 11th-century manuscript

The Sanctus (Latin: Sanctus, "Holy") is a hymn in Christian liturgy. It may also be called the epinikios hymnos (Greek: ἐπινίκιος ὕμνος, "Hymn of Victory") when referring to the Greek rendition and parts of it are sometimes called "Benedictus". Tersanctus (Latin: "Thrice Holy") is another, rarer name for the Sanctus. The same name is sometimes used for the Trisagion.

In Western Christianity, the Sanctus forms part of the Ordinary and is sung (or said) as the final words of the Preface of the Eucharistic Prayer of remembrance, consecration, and praise. The preface, which alters according to the season, usually concludes with words describing the praise of the worshippers joining with the angels, who are pictured as praising God with the words of the Sanctus. In the Byzantine Rite and general Eastern Orthodox Christianity, the Sanctus is offered as a response by the choir during the Holy Anaphora.

== Text ==
=== In Greek ===
Ἅγιος, ἅγιος, ἅγιος Κύριος Σαβαώθ· πλήρης ὁ οὐρανὸς καὶ ἡ γῆ τῆς δόξης σου, ὡσαννὰ ἐν τοῖς ὑψίστοις. Εὐλογημένος ὁ ἐρχόμενος ἐν ὀνόματι Κυρίου. Ὡσαννὰ (ὁ) ἐν τοῖς ὑψίστοις. (Note: This is the text of the two present forms (with or without the parenthesised article) of the hymn in Greek; for more details, see the Sources and the Hymn forms in Eastern liturgies sections.) (Note: A recorded example of the hymn chanted-sung in the form with the ὁ article, can be listened to here ( Page will play audio when loaded) (realmedia format). The cantor is the Archon Protopsaltes of the Great Church of Christ Leonidas Asteres, promoted to that position and title by Patriarch Demetrios.) (Note: A recorded example of the hymn chanted-sung in the form without the ὁ article, can be listened to here ( Page will play audio when loaded) (realmedia format). The cantor is the Archon Protopsaltes of the Great Church of Christ Thrasyboulos Stanitsas (1907 or 1910–1987), promoted to that position and title by Patriarch Athenagoras.)
Hágios, hágios, hágios, Kýrios Sabaṓth; plḗrēs ho ouranós kaí hē gê tês dóxēs sou, hōsanná en toîs hupsístois. Eulogēménos ho erkhómenos en onómati Kyríou. Hōsanná (ho) en toîs hupsístois.

In the Divine Liturgy of St. John Chrysostom and the Liturgy of St. Basil:

Ἅγιος, ἅγιος, ἅγιος Κύριος Σαβαώθ·
πλήρης ὁ οὐρανὸς καὶ ἡ γῆ τῆς δόξης σου,
ὡσαννὰ ἐν τοῖς ὑψίστοις.
Εὐλογημένος ὁ ἐρχόμενος ἐν ὀνόματι Κυρίου.
Ὡσαννὰ ὁ ἐν τοῖς ὑψίστοις.

Hágios, hágios, hágios, Kýrios Sabaṓth;
plḗrēs ho ouranós kaí hē gê tês dóxēs sou,
hōsanná en toîs hupsístois.
Eulogēménos ho erkhómenos en onómati Kyríou.
Hōsanná ho en toîs hupsístois.

In the Liturgy of St. James:

Ἅγιος, ἅγιος, ἅγιος Κύριος Σαβαώθ.
Πλήρης ὁ οὐρανὸς καὶ ἡ γῆ τῆς δόξης σου.
Ὡσαννὰ ἐν τοῖς ὑψίστοις.
Εὐλογημένος ὁ ἐρχόμενος ἐν ὀνόματι Κυρίου.
Ὡσαννὰ ἐν τοῖς ὑψίστοις.

Hágios, hágios, hágios, Kýrios Sabaṓth.
Plḗrēs ho ouranós kaí hē gê tês dóxēs sou.
Hōsanná en toîs hupsístois.
Eulogēménos ho erkhómenos en onómati Kyríou.
Hōsanná en toîs hupsístois.

=== In Latin ===
In the Roman Rite:

Sanctus, Sanctus, Sanctus
Dóminus Deus Sábaoth.
Pleni sunt cæli et terra glória tua.
Hosánna in excélsis.
Benedíctus qui venit in nómine Dómini.
Hosánna in excélsis.

In the Roman Rite, the Sanctus also forms part of the Te Deum, a solemn hymn of praise, but with an added reference to the "majesty" of the Lord's glory and without the Benedictus:

Sanctus, Sanctus, Sanctus, Dominus Deus Sabaoth.
Pleni sunt cæli et terra maiestatis gloriæ tuæ.

In the Mozarabic Rite, the hymn appears as at the Te Deum, but with the Benedictus added and ending with a version of the Greek Trisagion:

Sanctus, Sanctus, Sanctus,
Dominus Deus Sabaoth:
Pleni sunt cæli et terra gloria maiestatis tuæ,
Hosanna filio David.
Benedictus qui venit in nomine Domini.
Hosanna in excelsis.
Hagios, hagios, hagios Kyrie o Theos.

=== In English ===
In Anglicanism, the Sanctus appears thus in the 1549 Book of Common Prayer (and as set to music by John Merbecke in 1550):

Holy, holy, holy, Lord God of hosts.
Heaven and earth are full of thy glory
Hosanna in the highest.
Blessed is he that cometh in the name of the Lord:
Glory to thee O Lord in the highest.

In the 1552 Book of Common Prayer and 1559 BCP it appears without the Benedictus:

Holy, holy, holy, lord god of hostes,
heven and earth are ful of thy glory,
glory be to the, O Lord most hyghe.

The 1662 BCP has it thus:

Holy, Holy, Holy, Lord God of hoſts,

heaven and earth are full of thy glory;

Glory be to thee, O Lord Moſt High.

Later Anglican prayer books following the ritualist and liturgical movements of the twentieth century, restored the Benedictus to this form, yielding:

Holy, holy, holy, Lord God of hosts,
heaven and earth are full of thy glory.
Glory be to thee, O Lord most high.
Blessed is he that cometh in the name of the Lord.
Hosanna in the highest.

The following English version was used by most Lutherans in North America until 1978 when the ICET version was adopted in the Lutheran Book of Worship. This traditional version has continued to be used in the Divine Service of the Lutheran Church—Missouri Synod:

Holy, holy, holy, Lord God of Sabaoth;
heaven and earth are full of thy glory.
Hosanna in the highest.
Blessed is He that cometh in the name of the Lord
Hosanna in the highest.

In 1973 the International Consultation on English Texts (ICET) produced an ecumenical version that at that time was adopted by Catholics, Anglicans, Lutherans, Methodists and others:

Holy, holy, holy Lord, God of power and might,
heaven and earth are full of your glory.
Hosanna in the highest.
Blessed is he who comes in the name of the Lord.
Hosanna in the highest.

Since 2011 the Roman Missal in English has:

Holy, Holy, Holy Lord God of hosts.
Heaven and earth are full of your glory.
Hosanna in the highest.
Blessed is he who comes in the name of the Lord.
Hosanna in the highest.

=== In Coptic ===
As part of the Alexandrian rite, the Benedictus is not present in the Liturgy of Saint Cyril:

Αγιος, αγιος, αγιος.
Ⲭⲟⲩⲁⲃ `Ⲡϭⲟⲓⲥ ⲥⲁⲃⲁⲱⲑ:
`ⲧⲫⲉ ⲛⲉⲙ `ⲡⲕⲁϩⲓ ⲙⲉϩ ⲉⲃⲟⲗϧⲉⲛ ⲡⲉⲕⲱⲟⲩ
ⲉⲑⲟⲩⲁⲃ `Ⲡϭⲟⲓⲥ Ⲡⲉⲛⲛⲟⲩϯ.

== Sources ==
As Enrico Mazza writes:

The Sanctus became part of the Roman Eucharistic Prayer only in the first half of the fifth century; all in all, this was a fairly late period, inasmuch as by then the text of the Roman Canon had become fixed and was regarded as a text possessing great authority.

There exist two fundamental types of Sanctus: the Alexandrian and the Antiochene. The Sanctus of the Roman Eucharist derives from the Antiochene liturgy and has two parts: (a) the Sanctus true and proper, consisting of the acclamation from Isaiah 6:3; and (b) the Benedictus, a christological acclamation taken from Matthew 21:9. The Sanctus has been given a christological interpretation and a trinitarian interpretation, and this in both the East and the West. These differing interpretations may be due to the presence, in the text of the Sanctus, of a theological section, namely, the acclamation from Isaiah 6:3, and a christological part, namely the acclamation from Matthew 21:9.

The text of the Sanctus passed from Jewish use to Christian use at a very early time, since it is cited in the Apocalypse of John and in the letter of Clement to the Corinthians.

As can be read in the same source, in the Alexandrian tradition on the other hand,

the Sanctus consisted of only the first part, the citation of Isaiah 6:3, and lacked the Benedictus; this was the earliest form taken by the Sanctus in the Eucharist. This early state can be seen in the testimonies of Eusebius of Caesarea, the Mystagogical Catecheses of Cyril of Jerusalem, and, above all, the Ritual used in the Church of Theodore of Mopsuestia. In the latter, too, that is, in the archaic stage of the Syrian liturgy, the Benedictus was unknown, and the Sanctus consisted solely of the acclamation from Isaiah 6:3.

The first part of the Sanctus, the adaptation from Isaiah 6:3, describes the prophet Isaiah's vision of the throne of God surrounded by six-winged, ministering seraphim. A similar representation is found in Revelation 4:8. In Jewish liturgy, the verse from Isaiah is uttered by the congregation during Kedusha, a prayer said during the leader's repetition of the Amidah (18 Benedictions):

Kadosh Kadosh Kadosh Adonai Tz'vaot
Melo Kol Haaretz Kevodo.

The text of the second part, beginning with the word Benedictus (Latin for "Blessed") is taken from Matthew 21:9, describes Jesus' Entry into Jerusalem on Palm Sunday, which is in turn based on the first half of Psalm 118:26. In its present liturgical context "it points to the expected presence of the Lord in the eucharistic gifts". Within Anglicanism, the 1552 Book of Common Prayer omitted it and, though it is now permitted, "the choice whether or not to use the Benedictus is still for some a matter of Eucharistic theology and churchmanship".

The Sanctus appears in the Sacramentary of Serapion of Thmuis (the saint died in 360), but may go as far back to Christian liturgy in North Africa in the year 200.

== Hymn forms in Eastern liturgies ==
The present form of the Divine Liturgy of St. John Chrysostom, the primary liturgy of the Eastern Orthodox Church, reads (when in Greek) the following text:

Ἅγιος, ἅγιος, ἅγιος Κύριος Σαβαώθ· πλήρης ὁ οὐρανὸς καὶ ἡ γῆ τῆς δόξης σου, ὡσαννὰ ἐν τοῖς ὑψίστοις. Εὐλογημένος ὁ ἐρχόμενος ἐν ὀνόματι Κυρίου. Ὡσαννὰ ὁ ἐν τοῖς ὑψίστοις.

Hágios, hágios, hágios Kýrios Sabaṓth; plḗrēs ho ouranós kaí hē gê tês dóxēs sou, hōsanná en toîs hupsístois. Eulogēménos ho erkhómenos en onómati Kyríou. Hōsanná ho en toîs hupsístois.

The above differs from the Roman Rite Latin text

- in that the Latin adds to the word Dominus (Lord), which is the regular Latin translation of יהוה, the Deus (God), which is found in neither the Greek nor the Latin translations nor in the original text of Isaiah 6:3, but is found in Revelation 4:8: "Holy, holy, holy, is the Lord God Almighty, who was and is and is to come!"
- in that the Latin has the plural caeli, and the Greek the singular οὐρανός for the mention of "heaven", which appears in neither the Latin nor the Greek translation of Isaiah 6:3.
- in that the Greek gives two different forms of the phrase corresponding to Hosanna in excelsis, the second one including an ὁ article. The article is not found in Matthew 21:9. The form of the hymn without the article is also used in the Greek Liturgy of Saint James, and in modern settings, practises and contexts.

The Liturgy of Saint Basil of the Eastern Orthodox Church has the same form of the Sanctus as the Liturgy of Saint John Chrysostom, with its two variants of the Hosanna phrase.

In older Greek liturgical manuscripts, various forms of the hymn are attested; the ones that will follow below, belong to the ones edited by Swainson in his 1884 book The Greek liturgies. Among these forms, there are variations of the hymn being composed of practically only the Old testament part. Others include:
In the Liturgy of Saint John Chrysostom, one of them excludes not only the article ὁ, but also the article «τῆς»:

Ἅγιος, ἅγιος, ἅγιος, Κύριος Σαβαώθ· πλήρης ὁ οὐρανὸς καὶ ἡ γῆ δόξης σου. Ὡσαννὰ ἐν τοῖς ὑψίστοις· εὐλογημένος ὁ ἐρχόμενος ἐν ὀνόματι Κυρίου· ὡσαννὰ ἐν τοῖς ὑψίστοις.

Hágios, hágios, hágios, Kýrios Sabaṓth; plḗrēs ho ouranós kaí hē gê dóxēs sou. Hōsanná en toîs hupsístois; eulogēménos ho erkhómenos en onómati Kyríou; hōsanná en toîs hupsístois.

The Liturgy of Saint James as given in Swainson reads as follows:

Ἅγιος, ἅγιος, ἅγιος, Κύριε σαβαώθ· πλήρης ὁ οὐρανὸς καὶ ἡ γῆ τῆς δόξης σου· ὡσαννὰ ἐν τοῖς ὑψίστοις. Eὐλογημένος ὁ ἐρχόμενος ἐν ὀνόματι Κυρίου· ὡσαννὰ ἐν τοῖς ὑψίστοις.

Hágios, hágios, hágios, Kýrie sabaṓth. Plḗrēs ho ouranós kaí hē gê tês dóxēs sou; hōsanná en toîs hupsístois. Eulogēménos ho erkhómenos en onómati Kyríou; hōsanná en toîs hupsístois.

This text not only omits the article ὁ that is used in the Liturgy of Saint John Chrysostom, but also has Kyrie (vocative case) where the Liturgy of Saint John Chrysostom has Kyrios (nominative).

In current use, the Liturgy of Saint James may use the nominative rather than the vocative case of Κύριος; the article ὁ is also not present in this form at the concluding Hosanna.

Moreover, a different variant of the Liturgy of Saint James is found in the margin of a manuscript that gives only the three words Ἅγιος, ἅγιος, ἅγιος in the body: "In the margin, much abbreviated, may be discerned the following: Κύριος σαβαώθ, πλήρης ὁ οὐρανὸς καὶ ἡ γῆ τῆς δόξης σου. Ὡσαννὰ ἐν τοῖς ὑψίστοις· εὐλογημένος ὁ ἐλθὼν καὶ ἐρχόμενος ἐν ὀνόματι Κυρίου· ὡσαννὰ ἐν τοῖς ὑψίστοις. This produces the text:

Ἅγιος, ἅγιος, ἅγιος, Κύριος σαβαώθ, πλήρης ὁ οὐρανὸς καὶ ἡ γῆ τῆς δόξης σου· ὡσαννὰ ἐν τοῖς ὑψίστοις. Εὐλογημένος ὁ ἐλθὼν καὶ ἐρχόμενος ἐν ὀνόματι Κυρίου· ὡσαννὰ ἐν τοῖς ὑψίστοις.

Hágios, hágios, hágios, Kýrios Sabaṓth, plḗrēs ho ouranós kaí hē gê tês dóxēs sou; hōsanná en toîs hupsístois. Eulogēménos ho elthṓn kaí erkhómenos en onómati Kyríou; hōsanná en toîs hupsístois.

This version adds "he who came and" before "he who comes"; in this it resembles the Liturgy of Saint James in the tradition of the Syriac Orthodox Church:

Holy, holy, holy, Lord God Almighty; heaven and earth are full of His glories. Hosanna in the highest. Blessed is He Who came and will come in the Name of the Lord. Hosanna in the highest.

The Syriac Orthodox Church also has what it calls the Liturgy of Saint Dionysius, in which the Hosanna phrase appears only at the end:

Holy Holy Holy, Lord of Sabbaoth, Heaven and Earth are full of Thy Glory. Blessed is He that cometh in the Lord's Name; Hosanna in the highest.

The form used in the ancient Liturgy of Addai and Mari is much shorter:

ܩܲܕܝܫ: ܩܲܕܝܼܫ: ܩܲܕܝܼܫ: ܡܵܪܝܵܐ ܐܲܠܵܗܵܐ ܚܲܝܠܬ݂ܵܢܵܐ: ܕܲܡܠܹܝܢ ܫ̈ܡܲܝܵܐ ܘܐܲܪܥܵܐ ܡܸܢ ܬܸܫ̈ܒ݁ܚܵܬܹܗ: ܘܡܸܢ ܟܝܵܢ ܐܝܼܬ݂ܘܼܬܹܗ: ܘܡܸܢ ܗܸܕ݂ܪܵܐ ܕܙܝܼܘܹܗ ܡܫܲܒ݁ܚܵܐ܀ ܐܘܿܫܲܥܢܵܐ ܒܲܡܪ̈ܲܘܡܹܐ: ܐܘܿܫܲܥܢܵܐ ܠܲܒ݂ܪܹܗ ܕܕ݂ܵܘܝܼܕ݂: ܒܪܝܼܟ݂ ܕܐܸܬ݂ܵܐ ܘܐܵܬܹܐ ܒܲܫܡܹܗ ܕܡܵܪܝܵܐ: ܐܘܿܫܲܥܢܵܐ ܒܲܡܪ̈ܲܘܡܹܐ.

Holy, Holy, Holy Lord is the Lord God of hosts, for heaven and earth are full of his praises, and of the nature of his being, and for the excellency of his glorious splendor. Hosanna in the heights. Hosanna to the son of David. Blessed is he who came and will come in the name of the Lord. Hosanna in the heights.

The Coptic version of the Liturgy of Saint Basil also gives a short text of what it calls the Hymn of the Seraphim:

Holy, Holy, Holy, Lord of hosts; Heaven and earth are full of Your holy glory.

=== Alternative ancient names and ancient secrecy ===
The priest's introductions, following the rubrics that set what should be done by whom with each passage, uniformly call the hymn the ἐπινίκιος ὕμνος, i.e. "the hymn of victory". On the other hand, it used to be that, as Swainson notes about an attested variant form wherein only Ἅγιος, ἅγιος, ἅγιος is being quoted:

In the margin, much abbreviated, may be discerned the following: Κύριος σαβαώθ, πλήρης ὁ οὐρανὸς καὶ ἡ γῆ τῆς δόξης σου. Ὡσαννὰ ἐν τοῖς ὑψίστοις· εὐλογημένος ὁ ἐλθὼν καὶ ἐρχόμενος ἐν ὀνόματι Κυρίου· ὡσαννὰ ἐν τοῖς ὑψίστοις. Chrysostom frequently refers to this: sometimes as τὸ μυστικὸν μέλος; sometimes as ὁ πανάγιος ὕμνος; sometimes as the τρισάγιος ὕμνος. The knowledge of it as a whole was confined to the faithful. (Note: See μυστικόν, mystikon; μέλος, melos; πανάγιος, panagios.)

Sanctus, Sanctus, Sanctus Dominus Deus Sabaoth; pleni sunt coeli et terra gloria tua

Holy, Holy, Holy Lord God of Hosts; Heaven and earth are full of Your glory.

Hosanna in excelsis

Hosanna in the highest

Benedictus qui venit in nomine Domini.

Blessed is He who comes in the name of the Lord

Hosanna in excelsis

== Musical settings ==
The Sanctus has been set to numerous plainchant melodies, many of which are given in the Roman Missal, and many more composers have set it to polyphonic music, both in single settings and as part of cyclic mass settings.

Parts of the Hymn have also been used in modern music, notably "Prism of Life" by Enigma (album Le Roi Est Mort, Vive Le Roi!)

Modern versions of the content of Sanctus include the 1986 German hymn "Du bist heilig, du bringst Heil", derived from a Swedish model.

== Accompanying gestures ==
In the Tridentine Mass the priest joins his hands while saying the word "Sanctus" and then, bowing, continues to recite the whole of the Sanctus in a lower voice, while a small bell is rung; then, on reaching the words "Benedictus qui venit in nomine Domini", he stands erect again and makes the Sign of the Cross. He then continues immediately with the Canon of the Mass, while the choir, if there is one, sings the Sanctus. In the pre-1962 form, the choir pauses for the Consecration and continues with the Benedictus part afterwards. As a result of this division, the Sanctus has sometimes been spoken of as "Sanctus and Benedictus". However, in line with Pope John XXIII's revision of the rubrics of the liturgy, the "splitting" of the Sanctus was forbidden when sung to Gregorian chant (though not if sung polyphonically) and thus is not allowed in celebrations of the 1962 Tridentine Mass as authorized by Pope Benedict XVI's Summorum Pontificum.

In the Mass of Paul VI which resulted from the Second Vatican Council, the Sanctus is not split, since the whole of the Eucharistic Prayer is sung or spoken aloud, and the only ceremony prescribed for the priest during the Sanctus is to join his hands. He and the people sing or recite together the entire Sanctus, before the priest continues the Eucharistic Prayer.

== Use in architecture and art ==
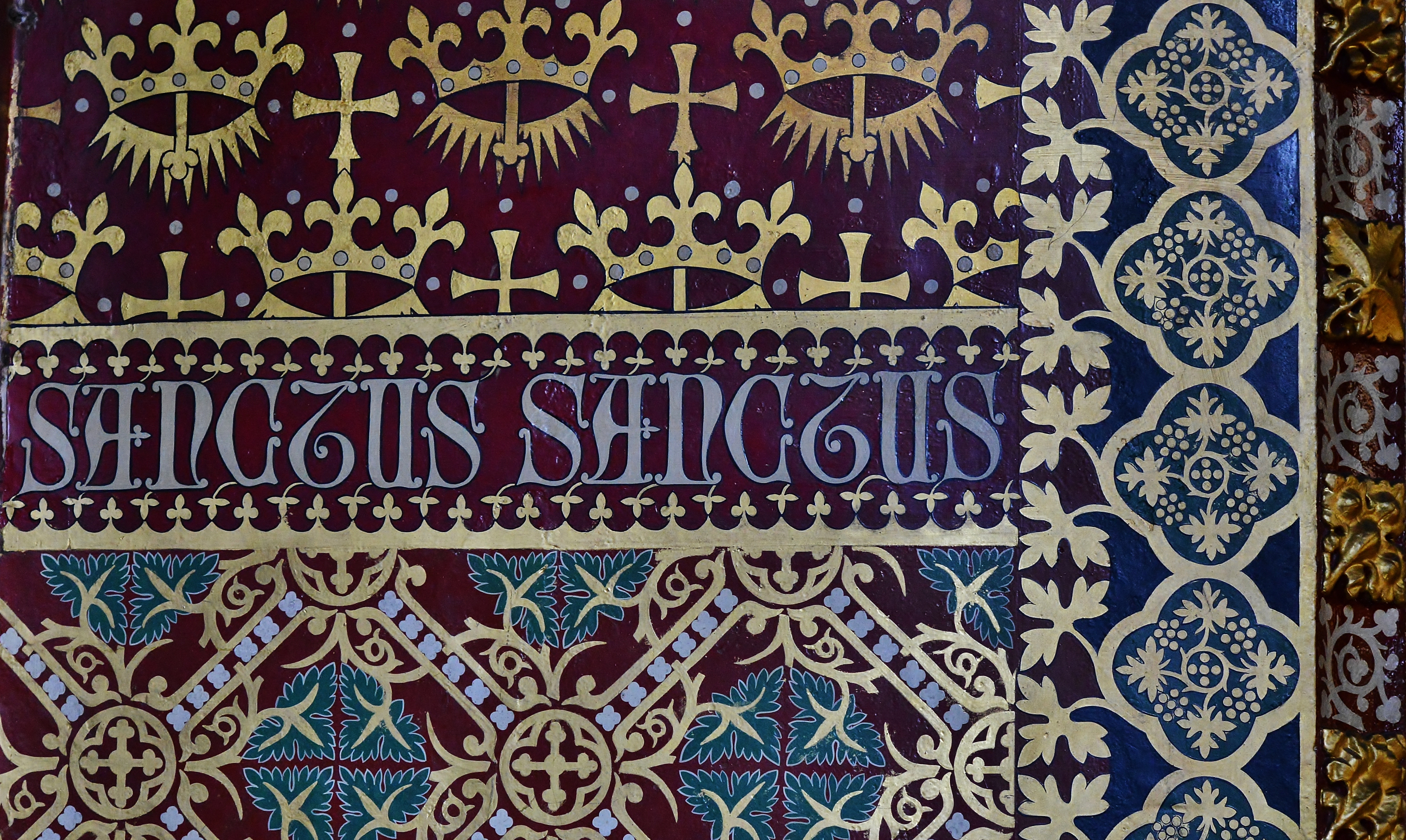
The word "Sanctus" as decoration in St Giles' Church at Cheadle in Staffordshire, England

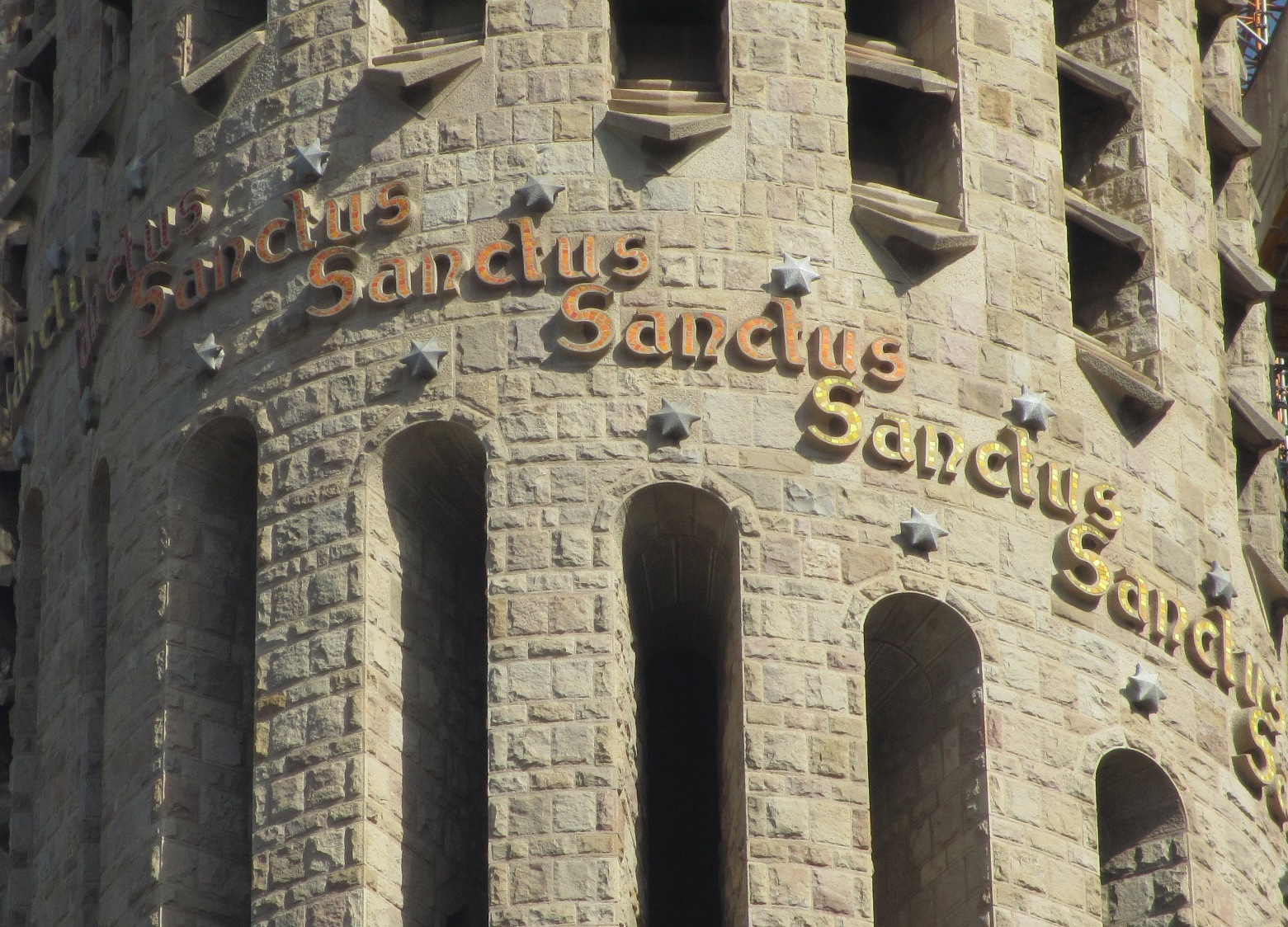
The towers of the Sagrada Família Basilica in Barcelona are decorated with the words "Sanctus", "Hosanna" and "Excelsis".

Words of the Sanctus are often used in church architecture and Christian art.
