= German Evangelical Church Assembly =

Protestant Church of Germany lay body

Jerusalem Cross is used as a logo of the German Protestant Church Assembly since 1950s.

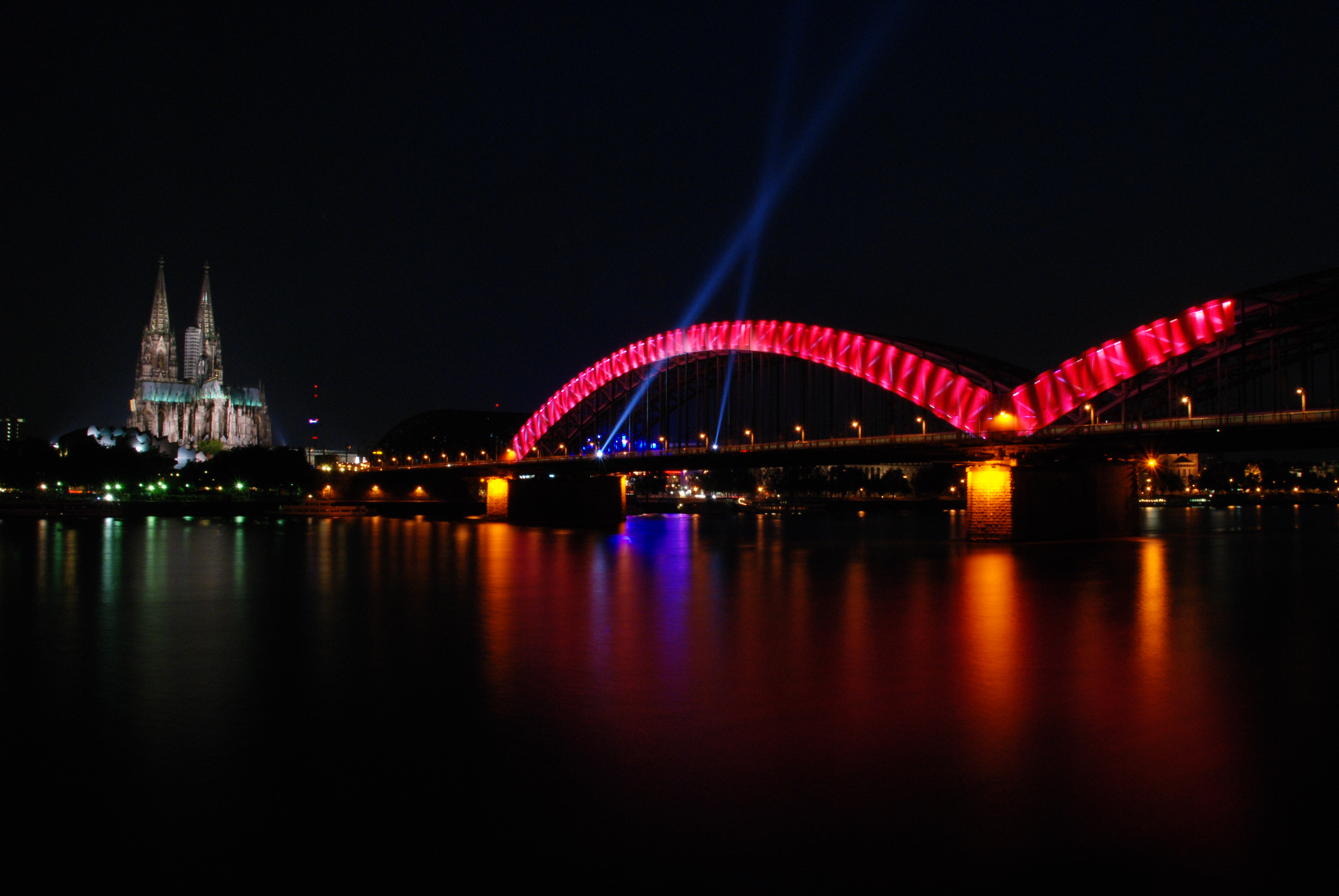
Illumination on the Hohenzollern Bridge for German Protestant Church Assembly 2007. Cologne Cathedral is in the background.

The German Evangelical Church Assembly (German Deutscher Evangelischer Kirchentag, DEKT) is an assembly of lay members of the Protestant Church in Germany, that organises biennial events of faith, culture and political discussion.

== History ==
The biennial five-day convention, the main mission of the organisation, was founded in 1949 by laypeople, with the intention of strengthening the democratic culture, following Nazi rule and the Second World War. Keypeople were Reinold von Thadden-Trieglaff and his circleof friends, which were inspired by Pietism and the idea of worldwide Ecumenism movement.

First Kirchentag in 1949 was in Hannover and hosted by the bishop Hanns Lilje. Präses of EKD-Synod and later president of Westgermany Gustav Heinemann announced the Founding declaration in Hannover.

During the 1970s and 1980s, the Church Assembly was strongly affected by the peace movement and became a key platform for Christian pacifism.

== Description ==
The German Protestant Church Assembly sees itself as a free movement of people brought together by their Christian faith and engagement in the future of the Protestant Church and wider society. The assembly partakes in bible study, lectures, and discussions, and also hosts concerts.

The five-day Church Assembly festival, or convention, takes place in a different German city every two years. This is the assembly's main mission. These events bring together around 100,000 visitors, who participate for the whole period. It has achieved a high importance, as can be seen by many attending politicians, including the chancellor and federal president; Angela Merkel has been a frequent guest to the assembly. The media impact, while the Church Assembly is held, is also considerable.

The last conventions were held in Dresden (2011), Hamburg (2013), Stuttgart (2015), Berlin (2017), Dortmund (2019), Franfurt (2021), Nürnberg (2023) and Hannover (2025).

== Scouting service ==
Christian Scouts have been helping since the very first German Protestant Church Congress in Hanover in 1949. They were among the cornerstones of duty from the very beginning. Since the Protestant scout associations immediately took over logistical support and public order services when the church conventions were restarted after the Second World War.

To this day, the VCP provides the largest contingent of support service personal. Since other groups are also helping, the Church Congress developed into the largest inter-group scouting meeting in Germany with about 4000 helping sevice man and womean.

== Namesake ==
Between 1848 and 1872 conventions of Protestant clergy were held under the same German name as they are nowadays: Deutscher Evangelischer Kirchentag. For a description, see the Evangelical Church Conference.
