= History of the Roman Canon =

Aspect of Catholic Church history

The Roman Canon is the oldest eucharistic prayer used in the Mass of the Roman Rite, and dates its arrangement to at least the 7th century; its core, however, is much older. Through the centuries, the Roman Canon has undergone minor alterations and modifications, but retains the same essential form it took in the seventh century under Pope Gregory I. Before 1970, it was the only eucharistic prayer used in the Roman Missal, but since then three other eucharistic prayers were newly composed for the Mass of Paul VI.

== Before St. Gregory I (to 590) ==
It is to Pope Gregory I (590-604), the organiser of the Roman Liturgy, that tradition ascribes the revision and arrangement of the Roman Canon. His reign thus provides a natural division in the discussion of the history of the Canon.

Gregory himself thought that the Canon had been composed by "a certain scholasticus", and Pope Benedict XIV discussed whether he meant some person so named or merely "a certain learned man". Gregory himself is credited with adding a phrase to the Canon. The Canon that he left represents in fact the last stage of a development that amounted to a "complete recasting", in which "the Eucharistic prayer was fundamentally changed and recast".

A distinction must be made between the prayers of the Roman Canon itself and the order in which they are now found. The prayers, or at least some of them, can be traced back to a very early date from occasional references in letters of the Church Fathers: the prayers beginning Te igitur, Memento Domine and Quam oblationem were already in use, even if not with quite the same wording as now, by the year 400; the Communicantes, the Hanc igitur, and the post-consecration Memento etiam and Nobis quoque were added in the 5th century.

=== Early period ===
In the 1st century the Church of Rome along with all other local churches (dioceses) celebrated the Eucharist by obeying Christ's direction and doing as he had done the night before he died, at the Last Supper. There were the bread and wine consecrated by the words of Institution and by an invocation of the Holy Spirit; the bread was broken and Communion was given to the faithful. Undoubtedly, too, before this part of the service lessons were read from the Bible, as explicitly stated by Saint Justin Martyr.

It is also known that this Mass was said in Greek. Koine Greek was the common tongue of Christians, at least outside Palestine, used throughout the empire since the conquests of Alexander the Great and then in the Roman Empire. This is shown by the facts that the inscriptions in the catacombs are in Greek and that Christian writers at Rome use Koine Greek.

Of the liturgical formulas of this first period little is known. The First Epistle of St. Clement contains a prayer that is generally considered liturgical (lix-lxi), though it contains no reference to the Eucharist. Also it states that "the Lord commanded offerings and holy offices to be made carefully, not rashly nor without order, but at fixed times and hours." From this it is evident that at Rome the liturgy was celebrated according to fixed rules and definite order. Chap. xxxiv tells us that the Romans "gathered together in concord, and as it were with one mouth" said the Sanctus from Is., vi, 3.

St. Justin Martyr (died c. 167) spent part of his life at Rome and died there. It is possible that his First Apology was written in that city, and that the liturgy he describes in it (lxv-lxvi) was that which he frequented at Rome. From this we learn that the Christians first prayed for themselves and for all manner of persons. Then follows the kiss of peace, and "he who presides over the brethren" is given bread and a cup of wine and water, having received which he gives thanks to God, celebrates the Eucharist, and all the people answer "Amen." The deacons then give out Holy Communion (loc. cit.).

Here is found the outline of the more recent Roman liturgy: the Preface (giving thanks), to which may be added from the First Epistle of Clement the Sanctus, a celebration of the Eucharist, not described, but which contains the words of Institution (c. lxvi, "by his prayer"), and the final Amen that remains at the end of the Eucharistic prayer.

One might deduce a likeness between the Roman use and those of the Eastern Churches in the fact that when St. Polycarp came to Rome in 155, Pope Anicetus allowed him to celebrate, just like one of his own bishops. The canons of Hippolytus of Rome (in the beginning of the 3rd century, if they are genuine) allude to a Eucharistic celebration that follows the order of St. Justin, and they add the universal introduction to the Preface, "Sursum corda", etc.

=== Exclusive use of Latin in Rome ===
The first great turning point in the history of the Roman Canon is the exclusive use of the Latin language. Latin first appears as a language used by Christian writers not in Rome, but in North Africa. Pope Victor I (190-202), an African, seems to have been the first Bishop of Rome who used it. After this time Latin would become the only language used by Popes in their writings; Cornelius (251-53) and Stephen (254-57) write in Latin.

Greek seems to have disappeared at Rome as a liturgical language in the second half of the 3rd century, though parts of the Liturgy were left in Greek. The Creed was sometimes said in Greek down to Byzantine times (Louis Duchesne, Origines, 290). The "Ordo Rom. I" says that certain psalms were still said in Greek; and of this liturgical use of Greek there are still remnants in the Kyrie Eleison and the Trisagion, etc., on Good Friday.

Innocent I (401-17) refers to the Roman Canon as being a matter he ought not to describe – an apparent survival of the idea of the Disciplina arcani – and says it is ended with the kiss of peace: "After all the things that I may not reveal the Peace is given, by which it is shown that the people have consented to all that was done in the holy mysteries and was celebrated in the church." He also says that at Rome the names of persons for whom the celebrant prays are read in the Canon: "first the offertory should be made, and after that the names of the givers read out, so that they should be named during the holy mysteries, not during the parts that precede" (ib.).

This is all that can be known for certain about the Roman Canon before Gregory I. The earliest books that contain its text were written after his time and show it as approved by him.

=== Relation to other anaphoras ===
A question that can only be answered by conjecture is that of the relation between the Roman Canon and any of the other ancient liturgical anaphoras. There are undoubtedly very striking parallels between it and both of the original Eastern rites, those of Alexandria and Antioch. Mgr. Duchesne is inclined to connect the Roman use with that of Alexandria, and the other great Western liturgy, the Gallican Rite, with that of Antioch (Origines, 54). But the Roman Canon shows perhaps more likeness to that of Antioch in its formulæ. These parallel passages have been collected and printed side by side by Dr. Drews in his "Entstehungsgeschichte des Kanons in der römischen Messe", in order to prove a thesis which will be referred to later. Meanwhile, whatever may be thought of Drew's theory, the likeness of the prayers cannot be denied. For instance, the Intercession in the Antiochene Liturgy of St. James begins with the prayer (Brightman, East. Lit., 89-90):

Wherefore we offer unto Thee, O Lord, this same fearful and unbloody sacrifice for the holy places ... and especially for holy Sion … and for thy holy church which is in all the world. …Remember also, O Lord, our pious bishops … especially the fathers, our Patriarch Mar N. and our Bishop [and all the bishops throughout the world who preach the word of thy truth in Orthodoxy (Greek Lit. of St James)].

The whole of this prayer suggests the "Imprimis quæ tibi offerimus," and certain words exactly correspond to "toto orbe terrarum" and "orthodoxis", as does "especially" to "imprimis", and so on.

Again the Syrian Anaphora continues:

Remember also, O Lord, those who have offered the offerings at thine holy altar and those for whom each has offered [cf. "pro quibus tibi offerimus vel qui tibi offerunt"]. …Remember, O Lord, all those whom we have mentioned and those whom we have not mentioned [ib., p. 92]. Again vouchsafe to remember those who stand with us and pray with us ["et omnium circumstantium", ib., 92]; Remembering … especially our all-holy, unspotted, most glorious lady, Mother of God and ever Virgin, Mary, St. John the illustrious prophet, forerunner and baptist, the holy Apostles Peter and Paul, Andrew … [the names of the Apostles follow] … and of all thy Saints for ever … that we may receive thy help ["ut in omnibus protectionis tuæ muniamur auxilio", Greek St. James, ib. 56-57].

The words of Institution occur in a form that is almost identical with the "Pridie quam pateretur" (ib., 86-87). The Anamnesis (p. 89) begins: "Commemorating therefore ["unde et memores"] O Lord, thy death and resurrection on the third day from the tomb and thy ascension into heaven ... we offer thee this dread and unbloody sacrifice ["offerimus … hostiam puram," etc.].

It is true that these general ideas occur in all the old liturgies; but in this case a remarkable identity is found even in the words. Some allusions to what were probably older forms in the Canon make the similarity still more striking. Thus Optatus of Mileve says that Mass is offered "pro ecclesiâ, quæ una est et toto orbe terrarum diffusa" (Adv. Parm., III, xii). This represents exactly a Latin version of the "holy Church which is in all the world" that we have seen in the Syrian Anaphora above. The Syrian use adds a prayer for "our religious kings and queens" after that for the patriarch and bishop. So the Roman Missal long contained the words "et pro rege nostro N." after "et Antistite nostro N." (see below). It has a prayer for the celebrant himself (Brightman, 90), where the Roman Missal once contained just such a prayer (below). The treatise "De Sacramentis" gives the words on Institution for the Chalice as "Hic est sanguis meus", just as does the Syrian Liturgy.

There are other striking resemblances that may be seen in Drews. But the other Eastern liturgy, the Alexandrine use, also shows very striking parallels. The prayer for the celebrant, of which the form was "Mihi quoque indignissimo famulo tuo propitius esse digneris, et ab omnibus me peccatorum offensionibus emundare" (Ebner, Miss. Rom., 401), is an exact translation of the corresponding Alexandrine text: "Remember me also, O Lord, thy humble and unworthy servant, and forgive my sins" (Brightman, 130). The author of "De Sacr." quotes the Roman Canon as saying "quod est figura corporis et sanguinis domini nostri Iesu Christi", and the Egyptian Prayer Book of Serapion of Thmuis uses exactly the same expression, "the figure of the body and blood" (Texte u. Unt., II, 3, p. 5). In the West the words "our God" are not often applied to Christ in liturgies. In the Gelasian Sacramentary they occur ("ut nobis corpus et sanguis fiat dilectissimi filii tui Domini Dei nostri Iesu Christi", ed. Wilson, 235), just where they come in the same context in St. Mark's Liturgy (Brightman, 126). The modern Mass refers to the oblation as "thy gifts and favours" (de tuis donis ac datis); so does St. Mark (ib., 133). But the most striking parallel between Rome and Alexandria is in the order of the Canon. The Antiochene Liturgy puts the whole of the Intercession after the words of Institution and the Epiklesis; in Alexandria it comes before. And in the Roman Canon the greater part of this intercession ("imprimis quæ tibi offerimus", "Commemoratio pro vivis", "Communicantes") also comes before the Consecration, leaving only as a curious anomaly the "Commemoratio pro defunctis" and the "Nobis quoque peccatoribus" to follow after the Anamnesis (Unde et memores).

Although, then, it is impossible to establish any sort of mutual dependence, it is evident that the Roman Canon contains likenesses to the two Eastern rites too exact to be accidental; in its forms it most resembles the Antiochene Anaphora, but in its arrangement it follows, or guides, Alexandria.

=== The order of the prayers ===
The division of the Intercession is unique among liturgies and is difficult to account for. Again, one little word, the second word in the Canon, has caused much questioning; and many not very successful attempts have been made to account for it.

The Canon begins "Te igitur". To what does that "igitur" refer? From the sense of the whole passage it should follow some reference to the sacrifice. One would expect some prayer that God may accept our offering, perhaps some reference such as is found in the Eastern liturgies to the sacrifices of Abraham, Melchizedek, etc. It should then be natural to continue: "And therefore we humbly pray thee, most merciful Father", etc. But there is no hint of such an allusion in what goes before. No preface has any word to which the "igitur" could naturally refer. At any rate there is no trace of it, either in our preface or in any of the other rites. Other difficulties are the reduplications between the ideas of the "Hanc igitur" and the "Nobis quoque peccatoribus". Various allusions to older forms of the Canon increase the number of these difficulties.

The Greek translation of the Roman Canon called the "Liturgy of St. Peter", edited by William de Linden, Bishop of Ghent, in 1589 from a Rossano manuscript contains some variations that point in this direction. For instance, it gives a version of the "Supplices te rogamus", and then goes on: "Aloud. First remember, O Lord, the Archbishop. He then commemorates the living. And to us sinners", etc. This puts the Intercession after the "Supplices" prayer, and exactly corresponds to the order suggested above.

Matthias Flacius published an "Ordo Missæ" in which there are still traces of the old order of the prayers. It begins with the "Unde et memores" and the Epiclesis; then come the "Te igitur", prayer for the pope, "Memento Domine famulorum famularumque tuarum", and eventually "Nobis quoque peccatoribus", in short, the whole Intercession after the Consecration.

The prayer "Hanc igitur" has some difficulties. The Greek version adds a rubric before it: "Here he names the dead". What can the "Hanc igitur" have to do with the dead? The Antiochene Liturgy, in which several parallel passages to the modern Canon have already been noticed, has a parallel to the second half of this prayer too, and that parallel occurs in its commemoration of the dead. There, following a prayer that the dead may rest "in the land of the living, in thy kingdom ... in the bosom of Abraham, Isaac and Jacob", etc., is found this continuation: "And keep for us in peace, O Lord, a Christian, well-pleasing and sinless end to our lives, gathering us under the feet of thy Elect, when Thou willest and as Thou willest, only without shame and offence; through thy only begotten Son our Lord and God and Saviour, Jesus Christ." We notice here the reference to the elect (in electorum tuorum grege), the prayer that we may be kept "in peace" (in tuâ pace disponas), the allusion to the "end of our lives" (diesque nostros) and the unusual "Per Christum Dominum nostrum", making a break in the middle of the Eucharistic prayer. The Syrian form with its plain reference to death ("the end of our lives") seems more clearly to be a continuation of a prayer for the faithful departed. But in the Roman form too is found such a reference in the words about hell (ab æterna damnatione) and heaven (in electorum tuorum grege).

Drews then proposes to divide the "Hanc igitur" into two separate parts. The second half, beginning at the words "diesque nostros", would have originally been the end of the Commemoration of the Dead and would form a reduplication of the "Nobis quoque peccatoribus", where the same idea occurs ("partem aliquam et societatem donare digneris cum tuis sanctis Apostolis er Martyribus" being an echo of "in electorum tuorum iubeas grege numerari"). This second half, then, would belong to the Intercession after the Consecration, and would originally fall together with the "Nobis quoque". In any case, even in the present arrangement of the Canon the "Nobis quoque" following the "Commemoratio pro defunctis" shows that at Rome as in other liturgies the idea of adding a prayer for ourselves, that we too may find a peaceful and blessed death followed by a share in the company of the saints, after our prayer for the faithful departed was accepted as natural.

The first half of the "Hanc igitur" must now be accounted for down to "placatus accipias". This first half is a reduplication of the prayer "Quam oblationem". Both contain exactly the same idea that God may graciously accept our offering. "Hanc oblationem" and "Quam oblationem" differ only in the relative construction of the second form. We know that the relative construction is not the original one. In the "De Sacramentis", to which reference has several times been made, the "Quam oblationem" occurs as an absolute sentence: "Fac nobis hanc oblationem adscriptam, rationabilem acceptabilemque, quod est figura corporis et sanguinis Domini nostri Iesu Christi" (IV, v). We also know that the "Igitur" in "Hanc igitur" is not original. The parallel passages in Serapion and St. Mark's Liturgy have simply tauter ten thysian (Drews, 16). Moreover, the place and object of this prayer have varied very much. It has been applied to all sorts of purposes, and it is significant that it occurs specially often in connection with the dead (Ebner, Miss. Rom., 412). This would be a natural result, if we suppose it to be a compilation of two separate parts, both of which have lost their natural place in the Canon. Drews then proposes to supply the first words of the "Quam oblationem" that we have put in the first place of his reconstructed Canon (see above), by the first half of the "Hanc igitur", so that (leaving out the igitur) the Canon would once have begun: "Hanc oblationem servitutis nostræ, sed et cunctæ familiæ tuæ, quæsumus Domine, ut placatus accipias ut in omnibus benedictam, adscriptam, ratam, rationabilemque facere digneris, ut nobis corpus et sanguis fiat dilectissimi filii tui Domini nostri Iesu Christi" (Drews, 30), and so on, according to the order suggested above. One word, "ut", has been added to this compilation, to connect the "Hanc igitur" with the continuation of "Quam oblationem". This word is vouched for by the Greek version, which has ina here (Swainson, 197). Drews further notes that such a change in the arrangement of the Canon is not inconceivable. Popes have modified its order on other occasions. Joannes Diaconus, the biographer of St. Gregory I, tells us that he re-arranged a few parts of the Canon ("pauca convertens", Vita Greg., II, xvii).

When then may this change be supposed to have been made? It was not made in the time of Innocent I (401-417); it had already occurred when the Gelasian Sacramentary was written (7th century); it may be taken for certain that in the time of St. Gregory I (590-604) the Canon already stood as it does now. The reason for believing that Innocent I still knew only the old arrangement is that in his letter to Decentius of Eugubium (Patrologia Latina, XX, 553-554) he implies that the Intercession comes after the Consecration. He says that the people for whom we pray "should be named in the middle of the holy mysteries, not during the things that go before, that by the very mysteries we should open the way for the prayers that follow". If the diptychs are read after the way has been opened by the holy mysteries, the Roman Canon must follow the same order as the Church of Antioch, and at any rate place the "Commemoratio vivorum" after the Consecration. Supposing, then, that this re-arrangement really did take place, it must have been made in the course of the 5th century.

However, Connolly disputes this translation of Innocent's letter. He demonstrates that the text should be translated as "So that they may be named in the course of the sacred Mysteries [the Canon] — not in the course of other those things we place before in order to open the way by (our) prayers for the mysteries themselves that follow." According to this interpretation, Innocent's reference to the prayers placed before is addressing the Secret in the Offertory, while the names are to be read during the Canon; he does not indicate where in the Canon the names are read out. Based on Innocent's usage of the word 'mysteries', Connolly rejects the interpretation that the names are read at the back of the Canon.

Drews thinks that we can go farther and ascribe the change to Pope Gelasius I (492-96). A very old tradition connects his name with at any rate, some important work about the Canon. The second oldest Roman sacramentary known, although it is really later than St. Gregory, has been called the "Sacramentarium Gelasianum" since the 9th century (Duchesne, Origines, 120). Gennadius I says that he composed a sacramentary (De. vir. ill., c. xciv). Moreover, the Liber Pontificalis refers to his liturgical work (Origines, 122) and the Stowe Missal (7th century) puts at the head of the Canon the title: "Canon dominicus Papæ Gelasi" (ed. Warren, 234). Baumer has collected all the evidences for Gelasius's authorship of some important sacramentary (Histor. Jahrb., 1893, 244 sqq.). It is known that Gelasius did not compose the text of the Canon. Its component parts have been traced back to a far earlier date. But would not so vital a change in its arrangement best explain the tradition that persistently connects the recent Canon with the name of Gelasius?

There is even a further suggestion that Drews has noticed. Why was the reversal of the order made? Evidently to bring the Intercession before the Consecration. This means to change from the same order as Antioch to that of Alexandria. Is it too much to suppose that we have here a case of Alexandrine influence at Rome? Now it is noticeable that Gelasius personally had a great reverence for the venerable "second See" founded by St. Mark, and that since 482 Bishop John Talaia of Alexandria, being expelled from his own Church by the Monophysites, sought and found refuge in Rome. He would have celebrated his own liturgy in the pope's city, and was certainly greatly honoured as a confessor and exile for the Faith. May we then even go so far as to suggest that we owe the present certainly unusual order of our Canon to Gelasius and the influence of John Talaia? So far Drews (p. 38).

Drews's theory has not been unopposed. An argument against it may be found in the very treatise "De Sacramentis" from which he gathers some of his arguments. For this treatise says: "In all other things that are said praise is given to God, prayers are said for the people, for kings, for others, but when he comes to consecrate the holy Sacrament the priest no longer uses his own words, but takes those of Christ" (IV, iv). According to this author, then, the Intercession comes before the Consecration. On the other hand, it will be noticed that the treatise is late. That it is not by St. Ambrose himself has long been admitted by every one. It is apparently an imitation of his work "De Mysteriis", and may have been composed in the 5th or 6th century (Bardenhewer, Patrologie, 407). German Morin thinks that Nicetas, Bishop of Romatiana in Dacia, wrote it (Rev. Benéd., 1890, 151-59). In any case it may be urged that whatever reasons there are for ascribing it to an early date, they show equally conclusively that, in spite of its claim to describe "the form of the Roman Church" (III, 1), it is Milanese. The very assurance is a proof that it was not composed at Rome, since in that case such a declaration would have been superfluous. An allusion occurring in a Milanese work is but a very doubtful guide for the Roman use. And its late date makes it worthless as a witness for our point. When it was written probably the change had already been made at Rome; so we are not much concerned by the question of how far it describes Roman or Milanese offices. So far the theory proposed by Drews, which seems in any case to deserve attention.

== From the time of St. Gregory I (590 to present) ==
Certainly, when St. Gregory became pope, the prayers of the Roman Canon were already fixed in their present order. There are scarcely any changes to note in its history since then. "No pope has added to or changed the Canon since St. Gregory" says Benedict XIV (De SS. Missæ Sacr., 162). We learn from Joannes Diaconus that St. Gregory "collected the Sacramentary of Gelasius in one book, leaving out much, changing little adding something for the exposition of the Gospels" (II, xvii).

These modifications seem to concern chiefly the parts of the Mass outside the Canon. We are told that Gregory added to the "Hanc igitur" the continuation "diesque nostros in tuâ pace disponas" etc. (ib.). We have already noticed that this second part was originally a fragment of a prayer for the dead. St. Gregory's addition may then very well mean, not that he composed it, but that he joined it to the "Hanc igitur", having removed it from its original place.

From the time of Gregory the most important event in the history of the Roman Canon is not any sort of change in it, but the rapid way in which it spread all over the West, displacing the Gallican Liturgy. Charlemagne (768-814) applied to Pope Adrian I (772-95) for a copy of the Roman Liturgy, that he might introduce it throughout the Frankish Kingdom. The text sent by the pope is the basis of what is called the "Sacramentarium Gregorianum", which therefore represents the Roman Rite at the end of the 8th century.

But it is practically unchanged since St. Gregory's time. The Gelasian Sacramentary, which is earlier than the so-called Gregorian one, is itself later than St. Gregory. It contains the same Canon (except that there are a few more saints' names in the "Communicantes") and has the continuation "diesque nostros in tuâ pace disponas", etc., joined to the "Hanc igitur", just as in the present Roman Missal. The Stowe Missal, now in Dublin (a sixth- or early 7th-century manuscript), is no longer a sacramentary, but contains already the complete text of a "Missa quotidiana", with collects for three other Masses, thus forming what we call a Missal. From this time convenience led more and more to writing out the whole text of the Mass in one book.

However, even during this period, there were still minor variants of the Roman canon in place. For instance, during the Synod of Rome held in 732, Pope Gregory III added a few words to the Canon of the Mass, but explicitly stated that this variant was only to be used in the Mass said in the oratory of Sancta Maria in Cancellis within St. Peter's Basilica. A comparison of seven manuscripts from the seventh to ninth centuries shows only quite minor textual variations to the Roman Canon: apart from orthography and word order, these include the use or not of the honorific sancti, explicitly stating the object God or Jesus Christ or not, using catholic or apostolic or both, and other indications of borrowing.

By the 10th century the Missal, containing whole Masses and including Epistles and Gospels, takes the place of the separate books ("Sacramentarium" for the celebrant, "Lectionarium" for the deacon and subdeacon, and "Antiphonarium Missæ" for the choir).

== Later variations ==
After the 9th century the Roman Mass, now quite fixed in all its essential parts (though the Proper Masses for various feasts constantly change), quickly became the universal use throughout the Western patriarchate. Except for three small exceptions, the Ambrosian Rite at Milan, the Mozarabic Rite at Toledo, and the Byzantine Rite among the Italo-Greeks in Calabria and Sicily, this has been the case ever since.

The local medieval rites of which we hear, such as those of Lyons, Paris, Rouen, Salisbury, York, etc., are in no sense different liturgies. They are all simply the Roman use with slight local variations – variations, moreover, that hardly ever affect the Canon. The Sarum Rite, for instance, which Anglicans have sometimes tried to set up as a sort of rival to the Roman Rite, does not contain in its Canon a single word that differs from the parent-rite as used by the Catholic Church, with the exception of a commemoration for the king. But some changes were made in medieval times, changes that have since been removed by the conservative tendency of Roman legislation.

From the 10th century people took all manner of liberties with the text of the Missal. It was the time of farced Kyries and Glorias, of dramatic and even theatrical ritual, of endlessly varying and lengthy prefaces, into which interminable accounts of stories from Bible history and lives of saints were introduced. This tendency did not even spare the Canon; although the specially sacred character of this part tended to prevent people from tampering with it as recklessly as they did with other parts of the Missal. However, additions were made to the Communicantes to introduce allusions to certain feasts; the two lists of saints, the Communicantes and the Nobis quoque peccatoribus, were enlarged to include various local people, and even the Hanc igitur and the "Qui pridie" were modified on certain days.

The Council of Trent (1545–63) restrained this tendency and ordered that "the holy Canon composed many centuries ago" should be kept pure and unchanged; it also condemned those who say that the "Canon of the Mass contains errors and should be abolished" (Sess. XXII., cap. iv. can. vi; Denzinger, 819, 830). In the official Roman Missal that Pope Pius V published in 1570, he made some changes such as removing from the Canon the mention of the emperor or king and shortening the "Communicantes" prayer by removing some saints' names and some clauses of the prayer. He accompanied the Missal with a bull forbidding anyone to add to or in any way change any part of it. It was to be the only one used in the West except for local uses that could be proved to have existed for at least 200 years. This exception allowed the Ambrosian Rite, the Mozarabic Rite, and variants of the Roman Rite developed by religious institutes such as the Dominicans, Carmelites, and Carthusians, to continue in use. The differences in the Missals of the religious institutes hardly affected the text of the Roman Canon, since they regarded rather some unimportant rubrics.

After Pope Pius V, Pope Clement VIII (1592–1605), Pope Urban VIII (1623–44), and Pope Leo XIII (1878–1903) published revised editions of the Roman Missal, which added a great number of Masses for new feasts or local calendars but, apart from very few retouches to the rubrics, did not affect the text of the Roman Canon until, in the 20th century, Pope John XXIII inserted the name of Saint Joseph. In the Institution narrative, Pope Paul VI a little later added the phrase "quod pro vobis tradetur" ("which will be given up for you") from Luke's account of the Last Supper to the words of Jesus previously in the Roman Canon, and removed from them the phrase "mysterium fidei" ("the mystery of faith"), which was not part of his words. The latter phrase was then used independently as an introduction to an acclamation such as is found at this point in Eastern anaphoras. He also replaced "Haec quotiescumque feceritis, in mei memoriam facietis" ("As often as you do these things, ye shall do them in remembrance of me") with "Hoc facite in meam commemorationem" ("Do this in memory of me"). The 1970 Roman Missal also made optional the recitation of the full lists of saints mentioned by name and the conclusion ("through Christ our Lord. Amen.") of many of the component prayers of the Roman Canon, which, with the exception of the words of consecration; a critic of the modern rite, Joseph A. Jungmann, said this makes the Canon appear "to be nothing more than a loosely arranged succession of oblations, prayers of intercession and a reverential citation of apostles and martyrs of early Christianity".

Since Pius V, the Canon does not change with the changes in the liturgical year, except that on a few feasts slight additions are made to the Communicantes and the Hanc igitur, and on one day to the Qui pridie.

== See also ==
- Canon of the Mass
- Text and rubrics of the Roman Canon
- Mass
- Pre-Tridentine Mass
- Tridentine Mass
- Mass of Paul VI
