= Anaphora of Saint Gregory =

Liturgy of the Coptic Church

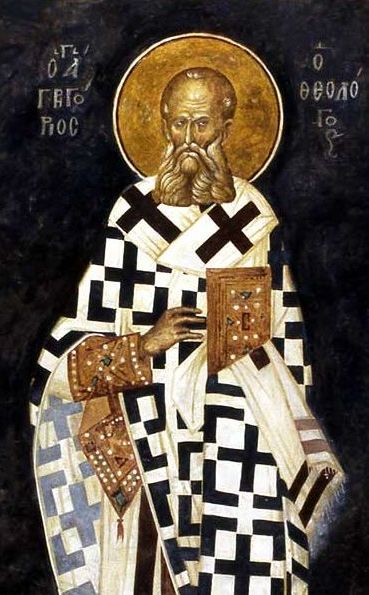
Icon of St. Gregory the Theologian; Fresco from the Chora Church

The Liturgy of Saint Gregory the Theologian (or Anaphora of Saint Gregory, Coptic: Ϯⲁ̀ⲛⲁⲫⲟⲣⲁ ⲛ̀ⲧⲉ ⲡⲓⲁ̀ⲅⲓⲟⲥ Ⲅⲣⲉⲅⲟⲣⲓⲟⲥ, romanized: Di-anaphora anda pi-ajios Jrejorios) is one of the three Anaphoras retained by the Coptic Church. The text is named after Saint Gregory of Nazianzus, one of the Cappadocian Fathers.

The anaphora or Eucharistic Prayer that is part of this liturgy is distinct as it is entirely addressed to Christ and not to the Father as anaphoras usually are.

== Use ==
This liturgy can be used at present by the Coptic Orthodox Church of Alexandria, as well as by the Coptic Catholic Church, in the solemnities of the Coptic calendar. This text doesn't cover the whole Divine Liturgy, but it extends only from the pre-anaphorical rites to the Fraction, so including the anaphora in the strict sense of the word. Along with this section the Liturgy of Saint Gregory includes also other additional prayers which can be used in place of the ones of the Coptic Liturgy of Saint Basil.

== History ==
This liturgical text derives from the West Syriac Rite, being imported in Egypt after the 6th century from Syriac monks who settled in Wadi El Natrun. The authorship of the core of this anaphora by Gregory of Nazianzus himself cannot be excluded. The text however was adapted to the Egyptian use, and it was one of the three anaphoras which use was permitted by the canons of Patriarch Gabriel II in the 12th century.

The oldest manuscripts of this liturgy date the High Middle Ages: the oldest is a 10th-century Sahidic incomplete manuscripts from the euchologion of the White Monastery, while the earlier Bohairic texts are 12th or 13th manuscripts from the Monastery of Saint Macarius. Also a Byzantine Greek recension exists.

== Structure of the anaphora ==
The Anaphora of Saint Gregory the Theologian follows the Antiochene (or "West Syriac") structure, which can be so summarized:

- Pre-anaphoric rites:
  - the Prayer of the Veil;
  - the Prayer of Reconciliation.
- Anaphora:
  - the Opening Dialogue
  - the Preface, glorifying Christ and giving thanks to him for the creation.
  - the Pre-Sanctus, introducing the Sanctus, first asking to unite with the heavenly Angelic liturgy, and later glorifying Christ with the choir of angels,
  - the Sanctus, conducted with the Benedictus,
  - the Post-Sanctus, recalling the whole history of Salvation, from the Original Sin to the Incarnation, Passion, Resurrection of Christ,
  - the Oblation, offering to the Lord the Eucharistic bread and wine,
  - Institution narrative,
  - the Anamnesis, referring to the Passion, Resurrection and Second Coming of Christ,
  - the Epiclesis, asking Christ to convert the Eucharistic bread and wine with his voice, and also to send the Holy Spirit on them in order to purify them and to make them the Body and Blood of Christ,
  - the Intercessions, praying for the Church and for the living (including the diptychs for current pope, bishop and other members of the Church),
- the Fraction,
  - introduction
  - the prayer of submission to the Son
  - the absolution of the Son
