= Antiochene Rite =

Family of liturgies originally used in the Patriarchate of Antioch

The Antiochene or Antiochian Rite refers to the family of liturgies originally used by the patriarch of Antioch. It includes the Liturgy of St James in Greek and Syriac, as well as other West Syriac Anaphoras.

== Liturgy of the Apostolic Constitutions ==
The major source for the history of the Antiochene Rite is the Apostolic Constitutions. This text contains two liturgical outlines, as well as the oldest known complete liturgy.

All Antiochene liturgies follow the same basic structure, including Syriac, Palestinian, and the related Byzantine liturgies. Key constants include:

- the Prothesis, a preparation of the oblation, developing in later liturgies into an elaborate service
- the Little Entrance, which becomes a solemn procession in later liturgies
- the Mass of the Catechumens, followed by their dismissal
- the Great Entrance, again a solemn procession in later liturgies
- the Ectenia
- the Anaphora, beginning with the words "Right and just" and interrupted by the Sanctus
- the words of Institution
- the Anamnesis
- the Epiclesis
- the supplication for all kinds of people at that place
- the Elevation with the words "Holy things to the holy"
- the Communion, distributed by the bishop and a deacon with the chalice
- the final prayer and dismissal

Two points in that of the Apostolic Constitutions should be noticed. No saints are mentioned by name and there is no Our Father. The mention of saints' names, especially of the "All-holy Mother of God", spread considerably among Catholics after the Council of Ephesus (431), and prayers invoking her under that title were then added to all the Catholic liturgies. The Apostolic Constitutions have preserved an older form unchanged by the development that modifies forms in actual use. The omission of the Lord's Prayer is curious and unique. It has at any rate nothing to do with relative antiquity. In the "Teaching of the Twelve Apostles" (VIII, ii, 3) people are told to pray three times a day "as the Lord commanded in his Gospel: Our Father", etc.

== Greek liturgy of St. James ==
Of the Antiochene liturgies drawn up for actual use, the oldest one and the original from which the others have been derived is the Greek Liturgy of St. James. The reference to it in Canon xxxii of the Quinisextum Council, which quotes it as being composed by St. James, the brother of Our Lord. The Council appeals to this liturgy in defending the mixed chalice against the Armenians. St. Jerome (died 420) seems to have known it. At any rate at Bethlehem he quotes as a liturgical form the words "who alone is sinless", which occur in this Liturgy (Adv. Pel., II, xxiii). The fact that the Syriac Orthodox Church uses the same liturgy in Syriac shows that it existed and was well established before the Chalcedonian schism. The oldest manuscript is one from the tenth century formerly belonging to the Greek monastery at Messina and is now kept in the University library of that city.

The Greek Liturgy of St. James follows in all its essential parts that of the Apostolic Constitutions. It has preparatory prayers to be said by the priest and deacon and a blessing of incense. Then begins the Mass of the Catechumens with the little Entrance. The deacon says a litany (’ekténeia), to each clause of which the people answer "Kyrie Eleison". The priest meanwhile silently recites a prayer, raising his voice only for the last words, when the litany has ended. The singers say the Trisagion, "Holy God, holy Strong One, holy Immortal One, have mercy on us." The practice of the priest saying one prayer silently while the people are occupied with something different is a later development. The Lessons follow, still in the older form, that is, long portions of both Testaments, then the prayers for the catechumens and their dismissal. Among the prayers for the catechumens occurs a reference to the cross (lift the horn of the Christians by the power of the venerable and life-giving cross) which must have been written after St. Helen found it (c. 326) and which is one of the many reasons for connecting this liturgy with Jerusalem. When the catechumens are dismissed, the deacon tells the faithful to "know each other", that is to observe whether any stranger is still present. The great Entrance which begins the Mass of the Faithful is already an imposing ceremony. The incense is blessed, and the oblation is brought from the Prothesis to the altar while the people sing the Cherubikon, ending with three Alleluias. (The text is different from the Byzantine Cherubikon.) Meanwhile, the priest says another prayer silently. The creed is then said; apparently, at first, it was a shorter form like the Apostles' Creed. The Offertory prayers and the litany are much longer than those in the Apostolic Constitutions. There is as yet no reference to an Iconostasis (screen dividing the choir or place of the clergy). The beginning of the "Anaphora" (Preface) is shorter. The words of Institution and Anamimnesis are followed immediately by the Epiklesis; then comes the Supplication for various people. The deacon reads the "Diptychs" of the names of the people for whom they pray; then follows a list of Saints beginning with "our all-holy, immaculate and highly praised Lady Mary, Mother of God and ever-virgin." Here are inserted two hymns to Our Lady directed against the Nestorian heresy. The Lord's Prayer follows with an introduction and Embolismos. The Host is shown to the people with the same words as in the Apostolic Constitutions, and then broken, and part of it is put into the chalice while the priest says: "The mixing of the all-holy Body and the precious Blood of Our Lord and God and Saviour Jesus Christ." Before Communion Psalm xxxiii is said. The priest says a prayer before his Communion. The deacon communicates with the people. There is no such form as: "The Body of Christ"; he says only: "Approach in the fear of the Lord", and they answer, "Blessed is He who comes in the name of the Lord." What is left of the Blessed Sacrament is taken by the deacon to the Prothesis; the prayers of thanksgiving are longer than those of the Apostolic Constitutions.

The Liturgy of St. James as it now exists is a more developed form of the same use as that of the Apostolic Constitutions. The prayers are longer, the ceremonies have become more elaborate, incense is used continually, and the preparation is already on the way to becoming complicated service of the Byzantine Prothesis. There are continual invocations of saints, but the essential outline of the Rite is the same. Besides the references to the Holy Cross, one allusion makes it clear that it was originally drawn up for the Church of Jerusalem. The first supplication after the Epiklesis is: "We offer to thee, O Lord, for Thy holy places which Thou hast glorified by the divine appearance of Thy Christ and by the coming of Thy holy Spirit, especially for the holy and illustrious Sion, mother of all churches and for Thy holy Catholic and apostolic Church throughout the world." This liturgy was used throughout Syria and Palestine, that is throughout the Antiochene Patriarchate (Jerusalem was not made a patriarchal see till the Council of Ephesus, 431) before the Nestorian and Monophysite schisms. It is possible to reconstruct a great part of the use of the city of Antioch while St. John Chrysostom was preaching there (370-397) from the allusions and quotations in his homilies (Probst, Liturgie des IV. Jahrh., II, i, v, 156, 198). It is then seen to be practically that of St. James: indeed, whole passages are quoted word for word as they stand in St. James or in the Apostolic Constitutions.

The Catechisms of St. Cyril of Jerusalem were held in 348; the first eighteen are addressed to the Competentes (photizómenoi) during Lent, the last six to the neophytes in Easter week. In these he explains, besides Baptism and Confirmation, the holy liturgy. The allusions to the liturgy are carefully veiled in the earlier ones because of the disciplina arcani; they became much plainer when he speaks to people just baptized, although even then he avoids quoting the baptism form or the words of consecration. From these Catechisms, we learn the order of the liturgy in Jerusalem in the middle of the fourth century. Except for one or two unimportant variations, it is that of St. James (Probst, op. cit., II, i, ii, 77-106). This liturgy appears to have been used in either language, Greek in Antioch, Jerusalem, and in the chief cities where Greek was commonly spoken, Syriac in the country. The oldest form of it now extant is the Greek version. Is it possible to find a relationship between it and other parent uses. There are a number of very remarkable parallel passages between the Anaphora of this liturgy and the Canon of the Roman Mass. The order of the prayers is different, but when the Greek or Syriac is translated into Latin there appear many phrases and clauses that are identical to ours. It has been suggested that Rome and Syria originally used the same liturgy and that the much-disputed question of the order of our Canon may be solved by reconstructing it according to the Syriac use (Drews, Zur Entstehungsgeschichte des Kanons). Duchesne and most authors, on the other hand, are disposed to connect the Gallican Liturgy with that of Syria and the Roman Mass with the Alexandrine use (Duchesne, Origines du culte chrétien, 54).

== Syriac liturgies ==
After the Miaphysite schism and the Council of Chalcedon (451), The Greek Orthodox Patriarchate of Antioch, the proto-Maronites and the Syriac Orthodox Church continued using the same rite. The Syriac Orthodox used only Syriac (their whole movement being a national revolt against the Emperor), originally, the Levantine and Egyptian Melkites used the Anaphora of St. James alongside their Jacobite counterpart, until the Crusades indirectly caused liturgical reform in the Antiochene Church due to Byzantine influence. From that point, the Greek Orthodox Church began to use the Byzantine Rite whereas the Syriac Orthodox Church continued using the Liturgy of St James.

The Syriac Liturgy of St. James now extant among Syriac Orthodox is not the original one used before the schism still used by the Maronites, but a modified form derived from it by the Syriac Orthodox for their use. The preparation of the oblation has become a still more elaborate rite. The kiss of peace comes at the beginning of the Anaphora and after it, this Syriac liturgy follows the Greek one almost word for word, including the reference to Sion, the mother of all churches. But the list of saints is modified; the deacon commemorates the saints "who have kept undefiled the faith of Nicæa, Constantinople, and Ephesus"; he names "James the brother of Our Lord" alone of the Apostles and "most chiefly Cyril who was a tower of the truth, who expounded the incarnation of the Word of God, and Mar James and Mar Ephraim, eloquent mouths and pillars of our holy Church." Mar James Baradaï, who helped preserve the church during the sixth century, and from which the name "Jacobite" (considered offensive by the Syriac Orthodox community, although used for purposes of identification by their associated churches in India) is derived (543). The list of saints, however, varies considerably; sometimes they introduce a long list of their patrons (Renaudot, Lit. Orient. Col., II, 101–103). This liturgy still contains a famous clause. Just before the lessons, the Trisagion is sung. That of the Greek rite is: "Holy God, holy Strong one holy Immortal One, have mercy on us." The Syriac rite adds after "holy Immortal one" the words: "who wast crucified for us." This is the addition made by Peter the Dyer (gnapheús, fullos) Syriac Patriarch of Antioch (458-471), which addition was rejected by the Eastern Orthodox and which was adopted by the Non-Chalcedonians as a kind of proclamation of their faith. In the Syriac use a number of Greek words have remained. The deacon says stômen kalôs in Greek and the people continually cry out "Kurillison", just as they say "Amen" and "Alleluia" in Hebrew. Short liturgical forms constantly become fossilized in one language and count almost as inarticulate exclamations. The Greek ones in the Syriac liturgy show that the Greek language is the original.

Besides the Syriac Liturgy of St. James, the Syriac Orthodox have many other Anaphoras, which they join to the common Preparation and Catechumen's Liturgy. The names of sixty-four of these Anaphoras are known. They are attributed to various saints and Syriac Orthodox bishops; thus, there are the Anaphoras of St. Basil, St. Cyril of Alexandria, St. Peter, St. Clement, Dioscurus the Alexandrian, John Maro, James of Edessa (died 708), Severus of Antioch (died 518), and so on. There is also a shortened Anaphora of St. James of Jerusalem. Renaudot prints the texts of forty-two of these liturgies in a Latin translation. They consist of different prayers, but the order is practically always that of the Syriac St. James Liturgy, and they are local modifications of it. A letter written by James of Edessa (c. 624) to a certain priest named Timothy describes and explains the Syriac Orthodox Liturgy of his time (Assemani, Bibl. Orient., I, 479–486). It is the Syriac St. James. The Liturgy of the Presanctified of St. James (used on the weekdays of Lent except for Saturdays) follows the other one very closely. There is the Liturgy of the Catechumens with the little Entrance, the Lessons, Liturgy of the Faithful and great Entrance, litanies, Our Father, breaking of the Host, Communion, thanksgiving, and dismissal. Of course, the whole Eucharistic prayer is left out–the oblations are already consecrated as they lie on the Prothesis before the great Entrance (Brightman, op. cit., 494–501).

== Recent times ==
The Oriental Orthodox in Syria and Palestine still use the Syriac Liturgy of St. James, as do also the Syriac Catholics. The Eastern Orthodox of the two Patriarchates, Antioch and Jerusalem, have used the Byzantine Rite for many centuries. Like most Christians in communion with Constantinople, they have adopted the Byzantine Rite (except for the small number in canonical jurisdictions who use reconstructed Western liturgies). It is not possible to say exactly when the older uses were forsaken for that of Byzantium. Theodore Balsamon says that by the end of the twelfth century the Church of Jerusalem followed the Byzantine Rite. By that time Antioch had also doubtless followed suit. There are, however, two small exceptions. On the island of Zakynthos and in Jerusalem itself the Greek Liturgy of St. James was used on one day each year, 23 October, on the feast of St. James the "brother of God". It is still so used at Zakynthos, and in 1886 Dionysios Latas, Metropolitan of Zakynthos published an edition of it for practical purposes. At Jerusalem even this remnant of the old use had disappeared. But in 1900 Patriarch Damianos revived it for one day in the year, not 23 October but 31 December. It was first celebrated again in 1900 (on 30 December as an exception) in the church of the Theological College of the Holy Cross. Archbishop Epiphanios of the River Jordan, celebrated, assisted by a number of concelebrating priests. The edition of Latas was used, but the Archimandrite Chrysostomos Papadopoulos has been commissioned to prepare another and more correct edition (Échos d'Orient, IV, 247, 248).

Note finally that the Maronites use the Syriac St. James with significant modifications, and that the Byzantine Rite as well as the Armenian Orthodox liturgies, are derived from that of Antioch. The so-called modifications are, however, primarily translation from the original Syriac to Lebanese Arabic. Given the near total isolation (the North Lebanon Mountain region) of Maronite Catholic adherents from the 6th to the 13th centuries, it is unquestionably the liturgy most closely resembling that used by the earliest Christian communities. The Roman Church recognized the importance of preserving this earliest form of the universals church by establishing the Maronite College of Rome in 1584.

== Sources ==
- Brock, Sebastian P. (1992). Studies in Syriac Christianity: History, Literature, and Theology. Aldershot: Variorum. ISBN 9780860783053.
- Brock, Sebastian P. (1996). Syriac Studies: A Classified Bibliography, 1960-1990. Kaslik: Parole de l'Orient.
- Brock, Sebastian P. (1997). A Brief Outline of Syriac Literature. Kottayam: St. Ephrem Ecumenical Research Institute.
- Brock, Sebastian P. (2006). Fire from Heaven: Studies in Syriac Theology and Liturgy. Aldershot: Ashgate. ISBN 9780754659082.
- Meyendorff, John (1989). Imperial unity and Christian divisions: The Church 450–680 A.D. The Church in history. Vol. 2. Crestwood, NY: St. Vladimir's Seminary Press. ISBN 9780881410563.
