= Text and rubrics of the Roman Canon =

Comparison of text and rubrics

The text and rubrics of the Roman Canon have undergone revisions over the centuries, while the canon itself has retained its essential form as arranged no later than the 7th century. However, there have been changes between the 1962 and 1970 versions outside of the preface and the Sanctus, specifically the 1902 English version of Nicholas Gihr's The Holy Sacrifice of the Mass (1902), and the version of the text from 1970. The rubrics, as is customary in similar liturgical books, indicate the manner in which to carry out the celebration.

== Audibility of recitation ==
The 1962 canon, according to the Ritus servandus in celebratione Missæ, IX, of the 1962 Roman Missal, is spoken in a tone described as silentio, a word that in the context of liturgy is officially translated into English as "quietly". The English version of Nicholas Gihr's book on the Mass translates secreto as "silently", but explains that it means that the canon is to be said not in absolute silence but "in a voice so subdued that the celebrant may hear himself, but not be heard by those around him". However, the rubrics of the canon indicate that, when saying the phrase "Nobis quoque peccatoribus", he raises his voice a little (elata aliquantulum voce), while the final "Per omnia saecula saeculorum" is to be spoken understandably (intelligibili voce).

Audible recitation of the whole 1962 Roman Canon was permitted in 1967.

The General Instruction of the Roman Missal, which covers the ground previously occupied by the Ritus servandus of pre-1970 editions, states: "The nature of the 'presidential' texts demands that they be spoken in a loud and clear voice and that everyone listen with attention." In addition, in a Mass with a congregation, "it is very appropriate that the priest sing those parts of the Eucharistic Prayer for which musical notation is provided".

The whole of the 1962 canon and of the preceding offertory prayers was recited aloud by newly ordained priest(s), along with the ordaining bishop, in the Mass of their ordination. The words of consecration in particular were to be said "slowly and rather loud". The canon was also recited jointly by the ordaining bishop and by the bishop he ordained in the rite of episcopal ordination. These were the only concelebrations admitted within the Latin Church at that time. That by newly ordained priests was limited in that they received communion only under the form of bread, reception from the chalice being reserved for the bishop.

Different reasons are proposed to explain why from the seventh century, beginning in Gaul, priests in the West came to pray the Roman Canon inaudibly for all but themselves. According to Elizabeth Harrington, "by the late 800s it came to be considered too holy to be heard by the people and was prayed in a low voice". The spread of the practice from East Syria, where it had originated, to the Greek-speaking Byzantine Empire is witnessed to by Emperor Justinian's legislation against it in 565, a time when it was still unknown in Rome. Uwe Michael Lang proposes another factor for its adoption in the West: the impossibility for the priest of making his voice heard in the vast Roman basilicas and other large churches.

== Te igitur ==
1962 and 1970 Latin text	1902 English translation
Te igitur, clementissime Pater, per Iesum Christum, Filium tuum, Dominum nostrum, supplices rogamus, ac petimus, uti accepta habeas, et benedicas hæc dona, hæc munera, hæc sancta sacrificia illibata, in primis, quae tibi offerimus pro Ecclesia tua sancta catholica: quam pacificare, custodire, adunare, et regere digneris toto orbe terrarum: una cum famulo tuo Papa nostro N. et Antistite nostro N. [et Rege nostro N.] et omnibus orthodoxis atque catholicæ et apostolicæ fidei cultoribus.	We, therefore, humbly pray and beseech Thee, most merciful Father, through Jesus Christ Thy Son, our Lord, that Thou wouldst accept and bless these gifts, these presents, these holy unspotted sacrifices, which, in the first place, we offer Thee for Thy holy Catholic Church, which Thou mayst vouchsafe to pacify, guard, unite and govern throughout the world: together with Thy Servant N., our Pope, N. our Bishop, as also all orthodox believers and promoters of the Catholic and Apostolic faith.

While the 1962 and 1970 texts are identical, the 1962 rubrics indicate that the priest, who has joined his hands at the Sanctus, extends them, raises them a little and again joins them. Then, bowing profoundly before the altar, he speaks the words of the prayer as far as "rogamus et petimus", at which point he kisses the altar and joins his hands in preparation for making the sign of the cross three times over host and chalice together at the words "hæc dona, hæc munera, hæc sancta sacrificia illibata". He says the rest of the prayer with hands extended within the limits then indicated for that posture: neither higher nor wider than the shoulders, with fingers joined and palms facing each other. According to the 1970 rubrics, the priest simply begins the prayer with hands extended in an unspecified way and at the word "benedicas" makes a single sign of the cross over host and chalice, the only time in the whole course of the Roman Canon that he makes the sign of the cross over either, in contrast to the 1962 rules, which have the priest do so 25 times within the Canon, 15 of them after the consecration.

The 1962 Ritus servandus in celebratione Missæ laid down that in praying for the Pope the priest should bow his head at the mention of the Pope's name, as at the name of Jesus (bowing towards the cross) or of the Blessed Virgin Mary or another saint (bowing toward their image, if present). The 1970 rules require such a bow only "when the three Divine Persons are named together and at the names of Jesus, of the Blessed Virgin Mary, and of the Saint in whose honour Mass is being celebrated" and do not specify the direction of the bow.

In the 1970 text a footnote after "et Antistite nostro N." indicates that at that point mention may be made of the coadjutor bishop or auxiliary bishops.

The oldest texts of the Roman Canon mention only the Pope. The addition of the local bishop and "all the worshippers of the orthodox, catholic, and apostolic faith" (not limited to clergy) is found in manuscripts from the mid-ninth century on, often with the mention of the civil ruler ("et rege nostro"). Because of the diversity of religious attitude of civil rulers in the 16th century, Pope Pius V omitted mention of the king in the Roman Missal that he issued in 1570 in response to the decrees of the Council of Trent. The omission of the king's name led to a probibition in France of Pius V's Missal, while Philip II of Spain (1556–1598) obtained authorization for mention of his name in his kingdom, as did Emperor Napoleon III of France in 1855. In English-speaking lands the practice was in evidence in the 19th century. Editions of the Roman Missal continued to be printed in various places with "et rege nostro N.", such as one in Naples in 1853, only a few years before the overthrow of the Kingdom of the Two Sicilies. The practice continued in Austria and Hungary until well into the 20th century. Neither the 1962 nor the 1970 editions of the Roman Canon show any trace of it.

== Memento, Domine ==
1962 and 1970 Latin text	1902 English translation
Memento, Domine, famulorum, famularumque tuarum N. et N. et omnium circumstantium, quorum tibi fides cognita est et nota devotio, pro quibus tibi offerimus: vel qui tibi offerunt hoc sacrificium laudis, pro se, suisque omnibus: pro redemptione animarum suarum, pro spe salutis et incolumitatis suæ: tibique reddunt vota sua æterno Deo, vivo et vero.	Remember, O Lord, Thy servants and handmaids, N. and N. and all here present, whose faith and devotion are known to Thee; for whom we offer, or who offer up to Thee this Sacrifice of praise for themselves and all pertaining to them, for the redemption of their souls, for the hope of their salvation and safety, and who pay their vows unto Thee, the eternal God, living and true.

At the indication "N. et N.", a rubric states that the priest joins his hands and prays briefly for those for whom he intends to pray.

Older manuscripts of the Roman Canon had "qui tibi offerunt" ("they offer it") without the preceding "pro quibus tibi offerimus vel" ("for them we offer you ... or"). Like Fortescue who also views the phrase as a later addition, Bradshaw and Johnson see as significant this addition of an originally alternative phrase that later became part of the fixed text: without it, the persons named were those who offered; with it, it was the priest who offered for them, a step towards considering irrelevant the actual presence of laypeople at the celebration of Mass.

"Sacrifice of praise" is a phrase taken from Psalm 49/50:23. The word "salus" can refer either to bodily health or to spiritual salvation.

In a concelebrated Mass, it is appropriate that this prayer and the following one (the Communicantes) be assigned to one or other concelebrant to pronounce alone with hands extended.

== Communicantes ==
1962 Latin text	1902 English translation	1970 Latin text	2011 English translation
Communicantes, et memoriam venerantes, in primis gloriosæ semper Virginis Mariæ, Genetricis Dei et Domini nostri Iesu Christi: sed et beati Ioseph, eiusdem Virginis Sponsi, et beatorum Apostolorum ac Martyrum tuorum, Petri et Pauli, Andreæ, Iacobi, Ioannis, Thomæ, Iacobi, Philippi, Bartholomæi, Matthæi, Simonis et Thaddæi: Lini, Cleti, Clementis, Xysti, Cornelii, Cypriani, Laurentii, Chrysogoni, Ioannis et Pauli, Cosmæ et Damiani et omnium Sanctorum tuorum; quorum meritis precibusque concedas, ut in omnibus protectionis tuæ muniamur auxilio. Per eundem Christum Dominum nostrum. Amen.	In communion with and honouring the memory, especially of the glorious ever Virgin Mary, Mother of God and our Lord Jesus Christ: and also of blessed Joseph, Spouse of the same Virgin, and Thy blessed Apostles and Martyrs, Peter and Paul, Andrew, James, John, Thomas, James, Philip, Bartholomew, Matthew, Simon and Thaddeus, Linus, Cletus, Clement, Xystus, Cornelius, Cyprian, Lawrence, Chrysogonus, John and Paul, Cosmas and Damian, and all Thy Saints; by whose merits and prayers grant that we may in all things be made secure by the aid of Thy protection. Through the same Christ our Lord. Amen.	Communicantes, et memoriam venerantes, in primis gloriosæ semper Virginis Mariæ, Genetricis Dei et Domini nostri Iesu Christi: sed et beati Ioseph, eiusdem Virginis Sponsi, et beatorum Apostolorum ac Martyrum tuorum, Petri et Pauli, Andreæ, (Iacobi, Ioannis, Thomæ, Iacobi, Philippi, Bartholomæi, Matthæi, Simonis et Thaddæi: Lini, Cleti, Clementis, Xysti, Cornelii, Cypriani, Laurentii, Chrysogoni, Ioannis et Pauli, Cosmæ et Damiani) et omnium Sanctorum tuorum; quorum meritis precibusque concedas, ut in omnibus protectionis tuæ muniamur auxilio. (Per Christum Dominum nostrum. Amen.)	In communion with those whose memory we venerate, especially the glorious ever-Virgin Mary, Mother of our God and Lord, Jesus Christ, † and blessed Joseph, her Spouse, your blessed Apostles and Martyrs, Peter and Paul, Andrew, (James, John, Thomas, James, Philip, Bartholomew, Matthew, Simon and Jude; Linus, Cletus, Clement, Sixtus, Cornelius, Cyprian, Lawrence, Chrysogonus, John and Paul, Cosmas and Damian) and all your Saints; we ask that through their merits and prayers, in all things we may be defended by your protecting help. (Through Christ our Lord. Amen.)

In the 1962 Canon, the priest joins his hands at the conclusion of this prayer, as with all prayers that conclude with "Per (eundem) Christum Dominum nostrum", and extends them again at the start of a following prayer. The words "et beati Ioseph, eiusdem Virginis Sponsi" ("blessed Joseph, Spouse of the same Virgin") were added by Pope John XXIII in 1962.

In the 1970 Canon, it is optional to say the bracketed parts: the names of saints from James (the brother of John) to Damian, and the conclusion "Per Christum Dominum nostrum. Amen."

Also to be noted with regard to such conclusions is that in the 1962 Canon whenever the Lord Jesus Christ has previously been mentioned, the word "eundem", meaning "the same" is added between the "Per" and "Christum" of the conclusion. In the 1970 Canon, "eundem" is eliminated regardless of whether or not Christ is previously mentioned.

In manuscripts and early editions of the Roman liturgy, the variations that on certain feasts replaced the normal Communicantes prayer were given immediately after the proper preface of the feast and were distinguished from the preface by the heading "Infra Actionem", which meant "within the canon". This custom was maintained in the original Tridentine edition of the Roman Missal and in later editions printed before 1962. In these editions the normal text of the prayer is also headed Infra Actionem. Adrian Fortescue explains the presence of this heading within the Canon by saying that the heading was by then looked on as the title of the prayer in any of its forms and was therefore added also to the normal text of the prayer. The 1962 edition no longer printed the by then reduced number of variants of the Communicantes prayer with the prefaces and placed them instead within the Canon after the standard form of the prayer. The surviving proper Communicantes were five: for Christmas and its octave; Epiphany; the period from the Easter Vigil to the following Saturday; the Ascension of the Lord; and from the Vigil of Pentecost to the following Saturday.

Those in the 1970 Roman Missal are the same five, but are designated for "the Nativity of the Lord and throughout the Octave"; "the Epiphany of the Lord"; "from the Mass of the Easter Vigil until the Second Sunday of Easter"; "the Ascension of the Lord"; and "Pentecost Sunday".

== Hanc igitur ==
1962 Latin text	1902 English translation	1970 Latin text
Hanc igitur oblationem servitutis nostræ, sed et cunctæ familiæ tuæ, quæsumus, Domine, ut placatus accipias: diesque nostros in tua pace disponas, atque ab æterna damnatione nos eripi, et in electorum tuorum iubeas grege numerari. Per Christum Dominum nostrum. Amen.	This oblation, therefore, of our service, and that of Thy whole family, we beseech Thee, O Lord, graciously to accept and to dispose our days in Thy peace, and to command us to be delivered from eternal damnation, and to be numbered in the flock of Thine elect. Through Christ Our Lord. Amen.	Hanc igitur oblationem servitutis nostræ, sed et cunctæ famíliæ tuæ, quæsumus, Domine, ut placatus accipias: diesque nostros in tua pace disponas, atque ab æterna damnatione nos eripi et in electorum tuorum iubeas grege numerari. (Per Christum Dóminum nostrum. Amen.)

The 1970 text differs from that of 1962 only in omitting a comma and in bracketing the conclusion, which the priest may either say or omit. In either case he joins his hands after the preceding words, grege numerari.

In the 1962 Canon, the priest holds his hands spread out over the offerings during this prayer, a gesture that Prosper Guéranger likened to that of the Old Testament priest who thereby consecrated to God and removed from profane use an animal for sacrifice or laid on the scapegoat the iniquities of the people. Others also linked the Hanc igitur prayer to the scapegoat ceremony. Michael Witczak sees the gesture rather as indicating the object of an epiclesis. The gesture, whatever meaning it may have had, was a late introduction into the Canon, appearing for the first time in the fifteenth century and limited to the Roman Rite, not being accepted in the Carmelite Rite and the Dominican Rite. Its use at the Hanc igitur prayer was not carried over into the 1970 Canon, in which the chief celebrating priest says the prayer with hands extended as usual, and in which a similar gesture by all the celebrating priests occurs during the following Quam oblationem prayer.

A special mention of the newly baptized is inserted in the Hanc igitur prayer at the Easter Vigil and throughout the Octave of Easter.

== Quam oblationem ==
1962 and 1970 Latin text	1902 English translation
Quam oblationem tu, Deus, in omnibus, quæsumus, benedictam, adscriptam, ratam, rationabilem, acceptabilemque facere digneris: ut nobis Corpus et Sanguis fiat dilectissimi Filii tui, Domini nostri Iesu Christi.	Which oblation do Thou, O God, we beseech Thee, vouchsafe to make in all things blessed, approved, ratified, reasonable, and acceptable: that it may become for us the Body and Blood of Thy most beloved Son, our Lord Jesus Christ.

In the 1962 Canon, the priest says the prayer with hands joined, except while making five signs of the cross to accompany the words "benedictam," "adscriptam," "ratam," "Corpus," and "Sanguis." In the 1970 Canon, the priest recites the prayer while extending his hands over the offerings while reciting it, as he does where the other three eucharistic prayers have an explicit pre-consecration epiclesis. That the Roman Canon has an epiclesis in this prayer is one of five existing opinions; the other opinions are: that the preceding Hanc igitur prayer, during which the 1962 canon has the priest extend his hands over the offerings, is the epiclesis; that the epiclesis is the Supplices te rogamus prayer after the words of institution; that the Roman Canon has no epiclesis; and that the mere gesture of the imposition of hands is a silent epiclesis.

From the Quam oblationem prayer to the Supplices te rogamus prayer, inclusive, two prayers that have been likened respectively to a pre-consecration and a post-consecration epiclesis, the words of the Canon are spoken or sung by all the concelebrants together.

== Qui pridie ==
1962 Latin text
Qui, pridie quam pateretur, accepit panem in sanctas ac venerabiles manus suas, et elevatis oculis in cælum ad te Deum Patrem suum omnipotentem, tibi gratias agens benedixit, fregit, deditque discipulis suis, dicens: Accipite, et manducate ex hoc omnes.

Hoc est enim Corpus meum.

1902 English translation
Who, the day before He suffered, took bread into His holy and venerable hands, and with eyes lifted up toward heaven, unto Thee, O God, His Almighty Father, giving thanks to Thee, did bless, break and give unto His disciples, saying: Take, and eat ye all of this:

For this is my Body.

1970 Latin text
Qui, pridie quam pateretur, accepit panem in sanctas ac venerabiles manus suas, et elevatis oculis in cælum ad te Deum Patrem suum omnipotentem, tibi gratias agens benedixit, fregit, deditque discipulis suis, dicens:

Accipite et manducate ex hoc omnes: hoc est enim Corpus meum, quod pro vobis tradetur.

2011 English translation
On the day before he was to suffer, he took bread in his holy and venerable hands, and with eyes raised to heaven to you, o God, his almighty Father, giving you thanks, he said the blessing, broke the bread and gave it to his disciples, saying:

Take this, all of you, and eat of it, for this is my Body, which will be given up for you.

Of the words that the 1962 text attributes to Jesus, it puts in large print only the five words "Hoc est enim Corpus meum" (which it calls "the words of consecration") and does not include in the words of Jesus the phrase "quod pro vobis tradetur"; the 1972 text includes this phrase and prints in large type all the words it attributes to Jesus, beginning with "Accipite et manducate ex hoc omnes".

The actions and words of Jesus in these accounts are not exactly those that any one of Gospels gives in speaking of the Last Supper. None of them mentions Jesus' raising his eyes to heaven, but Pope Benedict XIV states that it is a tradition that Christ did so, as He did at the miracle of the loaves and fishes as noted in the Synoptic Gospels' accounts of the feeding of the five thousand. The mention of Jesus' raising his eyes to God at the Last Supper is also found in the text of the ancient anaphora of the liturgy of the eighth book of the Apostolic Constitutions.

In recounting the Last Supper, Mark has "Take; this is my body"; Matthew has "Take, eat; this is my body"; Luke has "This is my body, which is given for you. Do this in remembrance of me".; and the First Epistle to the Corinthians has "This is my body, which is for you. Do this in remembrance of me". The word "enim" ("for") has been added, apparently by analogy with the words spoken at the consecration of the chalice.

As directed by the rubrics in all versions of the Roman Canon, the priest accompanies with similar actions the words about taking and looking up, but does not break or distribute the bread at this point. The 1962 Canon has him make the sign of the cross over the host at the word "benedixit". Except in the original 1570 edition of the Roman Missal, the rubrics of the Canon down to 1962 direct him to bow his head at the words "tibi gratias agens".

The 1970 rubrics direct the priest to bow slightly while reciting all the words of Jesus, and to pronounce them "clearly and distinctly, as the nature of these words requires". The 1962 Ritus servandus tells him instead to put his elbows on the altar as he recites, with head bowed, only the words "Hoc est enim Corpus meum", referred to as "the words of consecration", and to hold the host with his thumbs and index fingers alone, keeping the other fingers extended and joined together.

In the 1962 Canon, the priest, immediately after pronouncing "the words of consecration", genuflects in adoration of the consecrated host, rises and "shows it to the people" ("ostendit populo") − the action commonly called the elevation, since the Ritus servandus tells the priest to raise it as high as he comfortably can − after which he replaces it on the corporal, keeps his thumbs and index fingers joined, and then genuflects again. From this point, until his hands are ritually washed at the ablutions after communion, he keeps his thumbs and index fingers joined except when he touches the host. The reason is that lest any crumb of the consecrated host may have remained between his fingers.

In the 1970 Canon, the priest shows the host to the people immediately after the consecration, replaces it on the paten and genuflects in adoration, and has no obligation to keep thumbs and index fingers joined.

At Maundy Thursday, the Qui pridie prayer adds the phrases "pro nostra omniumque salute" ("for our salvation and the salvation of all") and "hoc est hodie" ("that is today") thus: "Qui pridie, quam pro nostra omniumque salute pateretur, hoc est, hodie, accepit panem ..."

The General Instruction of the Roman Missal, which applies to the 1970 Canon, states: "A little before the Consecration, if appropriate, a server rings a small bell as a signal to the faithful. The minister also rings the small bell at each elevation by the Priest, according to local custom." The bell signal preceding the Consecration is not mentioned ìn relation to the 1962 Canon, but its Ritus servandus directs that a server, while lifting the rear of the priest's chasuble during the elevations, should with his right hand ring a bell three times or continuously. This direction was not in the original Tridentine Roman Missal, being inserted only in 1604.

== Simili modo ==
1962 Latin text
Simili modo, postquam cenatum est, accipiens et hunc præclarum calicem in sanctas ac venerabiles manus suas, item tibi gratias agens benedixit, deditque discipulis suis, dicens: Accipite et bibite ex eo omnes:

Hic est enim Calix Sanguinis mei, novi et æterni testamenti: mysterium fidei: qui pro vobis et pro multis effundetur in remissionem peccatorum.
hæc quotiescumque feceritis, in mei memoriam facietis.

1902 English translation
In like manner, after supper, taking also this excellent chalice into His holy and venerable hands: and giving thanks to Thee, He blessed, and gave to His disciples, saying: Take, and drink ye all of it:

For this is the Chalice of My Blood, of the new and eternal testament: the mystery of faith: which shall be shed for you, and for many, unto the remission of sins.
As often as you do these things, ye shall do them in remembrance of me.

1970 Latin text
Simili modo, postquam cenatum est, accipiens et hunc præclarum calicem in sanctas ac venerabiles manus suas, item tibi gratias agens benedixit, deditque discipulis suis, dicens:

Accipite et bibite ex eo omnes: Hic est enim calix Sanguinis mei novi et æterni testamenti, qui pro vobis et pro multis effundetur in remissionem peccatorum. Hoc facite in meam commemorationem.

2011 English translation
In a similar way, when supper was ended, he took this precious chalice in his holy and venerable hands, and once more giving you thanks, he said the blessing and gave the chalice to his disciples, saying:

Take this, all of you, and drink from it, for this is the chalice of my Blood, the Blood of the new and eternal covenant, which will be poured out for you and for many for the forgiveness of sins. Do this in memory of me.

The words attributed to Jesus regarding the chalice are based on Matthew 26:27−28, "Drink of it, all of you, for this is my blood of the covenant, which is poured out for many for the forgiveness of sins"; Mark 24:24, "This is my blood of the covenant, which is poured out for many"; Luke 22:17−20, "Take this, and divide it among yourselves. [...] Do this in remembrance of me. [...] This cup that is poured out for you is the new covenant in my blood"; and 1 Corinthians 21:25, "This cup is the new covenant in my blood. Do this, as often as you drink it, in remembrance of me."

Adrian Fortescue remarks that two elements of what is attributed to Jesus, "et æterni" and "mysterium fidei", "are not in the New Testament at all". The Letter to the Hebrews does have the prayer, "May the God of peace who brought again from the dead our Lord Jesus, the great shepherd of the sheep, by the blood of the eternal covenant (Vulgate: in sanguine testamenti æterni) equip you with everything good" On "mysterium fidei", see the following section.

In the consecration of the chalice, as in the consecration of the bread, the 1962 Roman Canon prints in large letters only some of the words that it attributes to Jesus: it presents in the same type as the narrative account the initial phrase, "Accipite et bibite ex eo omnes", and the final phrase, "hæc quotiescumque feceritis, in mei memoriam facietis".

The 1962 Canon separates the latter phrase from the other words of Jesus by an action that excludes them from the act of consecration, instructing the priest to say it when already genuflecting before the chalice in adoration. The exclusion was still more obvious in the original 1570 edition of the Tridentine Roman Missal, which had the priest say the phrase after adoring the chalice and while displaying the chalice for the veneration of the people ("surgit et ostendit populo: dicens. hæc quotiescumque feceritis, in mei memoriam facietis").

The 1970 Canon treats all the words that it ascribes to Jesus as having equal dignity. It replaces the statement, "hæc quotiescumque feceritis, in mei memoriam facietis" ("As often as you do these things, ye shall do them in remembrance of me"), with the instruction, "Hoc facite in meam commemorationem" ("Do this in memory of me").

== Mysterium fidei ==
The 1962 and earlier forms of the Roman Canon included among the words attributed to Jesus in connection with the consecration of the chalice the phrase "mysterium fidei" (1 Tim. 3:9). It has been suggested that this was an anti-Manichaean addition by Pope Leo the Great (440-461), insisting on the goodness of material things: the material blood of Christ and the material elements used in the Eucharist. Another proposed explanation is that originally the phrase was not spoken by the priest but was a calling to attention by the deacon.

In the 1970 Roman Canon, the phrase "Mysterium fidei", removed from the context of the words of Jesus, is said or sung by the priest after consecrating the chalice, showing it to the people, and genuflecting in adoration. It serves as an introduction to the acclamation by the people.

The people respond by acclaiming:

Mortem tuam annuntiamus, Domine, et tuam resurrectionem confitemur, donec venias.
(We proclaim your Death, O Lord, and profess your Resurrection until you come again.)
Or:
Quotiescumque manducamus panem hunc et calicem bibimus, mortem tuam annuntiamus, Domine, donec venias.
(When we eat this Bread and drink this Cup, we proclaim your Death, O Lord, until you come again.)
Or:
Salvator mundi, salva nos, qui per crucem et resurrectionem tuam liberasti nos.
(Save us, Saviour of the world, for by your Cross and Resurrection you have set us free.)

Of these acclamations, the first two are closely based on Saint Paul's comment in 1 Corinthians 11:26, "As often as you eat this bread and drink the cup, you proclaim the Lord's death until he comes", making explicit the reference to the resurrection of Christ implicit in the comment. The third derives from the third antiphon which the Roman Missal prescribes that the choir chant while the Blessed Sacrament is brought to the altar after the Veneration of the Cross during the Good Friday Liturgy. The Good Friday antiphon is Salvator mundi, salva nos, qui per crucem et [sanguinem redemisti] nos [auxiliare nobis te deprecamur Deus noster].
(Save us, Saviour of the world, for by your Cross and [Blood you have redeemed] us; come to our aid, we beseech you, our God.)

== Unde et memores ==
1962 and 1970 Latin text	1902 English translation
Unde et memores, Domine, nos servi tui, sed et plebs tua sancta, eiusdem Christi, Filii tui, Domini nostri, tam beatæ passionis, necnon et ab inferis resurrectionis, sed et in cælos gloriosæ ascensionis: offerimus præclaræ maiestati tuæ de tuis donis ac datis hostiam puram, hostiam sanctam, hostiam immaculatam, Panem sanctum vitæ æternæ et Calicem salutis perpetuæ.	Wherefore, O Lord, we Thy servants, and likewise Thy holy people, calling to mind the blessed Passion of the same Christ Thy Son, our Lord, together with His Resurrection from the grave, and also His glorious Ascension into heaven, offer unto Thy excellent Majesty, of Thy gifts and presents, a pure Victim, a holy Victim, an immaculate Victim: the holy bread of eternal life, and the chalice of everlasting salvation.

This prayer is an anamnesis, a solemn recalling, immediately after the Words of Institution, of Christ's death and resurrection (cf. 1 Corinthians 11:26), to which the Roman Canon adds a mention of his ascension.

The 1962 rubrics, but not those of 1970, prescribe that, at the mentions of the words "hostiam", "Panem" and "Calicem", the priest make five signs of the cross over the consecrated bread and wine, the first of a total of fifteen to be made after the consecration.

== Supra quæ ==
1962 and 1970 Latin text	1902 English translation
Supra quæ propitio ac sereno vultu respicere digneris: et accepta habere, sicuti accepta habere dignatus es munera pueri tui iusti Abel, et sacrificium Patriarchæ nostri Abrahæ, et quod tibi obtulit summus sacerdos tuus Melchisedech, sanctum sacrificium, immaculatam hostiam.	Upon which do Thou vouchsafe to look with favorable and gracious countenance, and accept them, as Thou didst vouchsafe to accept the gifts of Thy just servant Abel, and the sacrifice of our Patriarch Abraham, and that which Thy Highpriest Melchisedech offered unto Thee, a holy Sacrifice, an unspotted Victim.

The earliest attestation of the Roman Canon is in the De sacramentis of Ambrose (c. 340 – 397). At that time the prayer Supra quæ came after what is now the following prayer, Supplices, and the two formed a single prayer, a structure corresponding exactly with that of the Anaphora of St Mark, which demonstrates that "the Roman canon, too, has had a history involving an evolution, development and reworkings".

== Supplices te rogamus ==
1962 Latin text	1902 English translation	1970 Latin text	2011 English translation
Supplices te rogamus, omnipotens Deus: iube hæc perferri per manus sancti Angeli tui in sublime altare tuum, in conspectu divinæ maiestatis tuæ: ut, quotquot ex hac altaris participatione sacrosanctum Filii tui Corpus et Sanguinem sumpserimus, omni benedictione cælesti et gratia repleamur. Per eundem Christum Dominum nostrum. Amen.	We humbly beseech Thee, Almighty God, command these to be carried by the hands of Thy holy Angel to Thine Altar on high, in the presence of Thy divine Majesty, that as many of us as shall, by partaking at this Altar, receive the most sacred Body and Blood of Thy Son, may be filled with all heavenly blessing and grace. Through the same Christ our Lord. Amen.	Supplices te rogamus, omnipotens Deus: iube hæc perferri per manus sancti Angeli tui in sublime altare tuum, in conspectu divinæ maiestatis tuæ: ut, quotquot ex hac altaris participatione sacrosanctum Filii tui Corpus et Sanguinem sumpserimus, omni benedictione cælesti et gratia repleamur. (Per Christum Dominum nostrum. Amen.)	In humble prayer we ask you, almighty God: command that these gifts be borne by the hands of your holy Angel to your altar on high in the sight of your divine majesty, so that all of us, who through this participation at the altar receive the most holy Body and Blood of your Son, may be filled with every grace and heavenly blessing. (Through Christ our Lord. Amen.)

The 1962 and 1970 texts differ only in the 1970 bracketing of the conclusion and the omission in it of the word "eundem".

In the 1962 rubrics, the priest, bowing profoundly, places his joined hands on the edge of the altar until the mention of the altar, at which point he kisses it, and then makes the sign of the cross over the consecrated host at the word "Corpus" ("Body"), over the chalice with the consecrated wine at the word "Sanguinem" ("Blood") and finally over himself.

In the 1970 rubrics, the priest says this prayer bowing with joined hands until the phrase "omni ... gratia repleamur" ("may be filled with every grace and heavenly blessing"), which he says standing erect and signing himself with the sign of the cross.

Scholars disagree on whether, in spite of the lack of explicit mention of the Holy Spirit, this prayer can be considered an epiclesis (cf. what is said above with regard to the Quam oblationem prayer) and who is the "Angel" mentioned in it.

== Commemoration of the dead ==
1962 Latin text	1902 English translation	1970 Latin text
Memento etiam, Domine, famulorum famularumque tuarum N. et N., qui nos præcesserunt cum signo fidei, et dormiunt in somno pacis. Ipsis, Domine, et omnibus in Christo quiescentibus, locum refrigerii, lucis et pacis, ut indulgeas, deprecamur. Per eundem Christum Dominum nostrum. Amen.	Remember also, O Lord, Thy servants and handmaids, N. and N., who have gone before us with the sign of faith, and sleep the sleep of peace. To these, O Lord, and to all who rest in Christ, grant, we beseech Thee, a place of refreshment, of light, and of peace. Through Christ our Lord. Amen.	Memento etiam, Domine, famulorum famularumque tuarum N. et N., qui nos præcesserunt cum signo fidei, et dormiunt in somno pacis. Ipsis, Domine, et omnibus in Christo quiescentibus, locum refrigerii, lucis et pacis, ut indulgeas, deprecamur. (Per Christum Dominum nostrum. Amen.)

The 1970 text differs from that of 1962 only in bracketing the prayer conclusion and in not including in the conclusion the word "eundem".

Both the 1962 and the 1970 rubrics direct that, after the words "dormiunt in somno pacis" ("rest in the sleep of peace"), the priest joins his hands and prays briefly for the dead for whom he wishes to pray.

In a concelebrated Mass, this prayer is said by an individual concelebrant.

Writing in 1908, Adrian Fortescue noted: "At the final clause "Per eumdem", etc., the priest not only folds his hands but bows the head — a unique case in the Roman Rite, for which there has not been found any satisfactory explanation. Benedict XIV quotes from Cavalieri a mystic reason — because Christ bowed His head when He died, and we here think of the dead. The rubric occurs in Pius V's Missal."

The peculiarity of this rubric was noted also by Prosper Guéranger: "The Priest terminates the Prayer, in the usual manner: Per eumdem Christum Dominum nostrum. Amen. Besides this, there is a special rubric which bids him bow his head whilst saying these concluding words, which is not prescribed in the case of closing other prayers."

The rubric of which they speak was still present in the 1920 typical edition of the Roman Missal, but was omitted in the 1962 edition and has not been included in the Vatican II editions.

== Nobis quoque peccatoribus ==
1962 Latin text	1902 English translation	1970 Latin text	2011 English translation
Nobis quoque peccatoribus, famulis tuis, de multitudine miserationum tuarum sperantibus, partem aliquam et societatem donare digneris, cum tuis sanctis Apostolis et Martyribus: cum Ioanne, Stephano, Matthia, Barnaba, Ignatio, Alexandro, Marcellino, Petro, Felicitate, Perpetua, Agatha, Lucia, Agnete, Cæcilia, Anastasia et omnibus Sanctis tuis: intra quorum nos consortium, non æstimator meriti, sed veniæ, quæsumus, largitor admitte. Per Christum Dominum nostrum.	To us also, Thy sinful servants, who hope in the multitude of Thy mercies, vouchsafe to grant some part and fellowship with Thy holy Apostles and Martyrs: with John, Stephen, Matthias, Barnaby, Ignatius, Alexander, Marcellinus, Peter, Felicitas, Perpetua, Agatha, Lucy, Agnes, Cecilia, Anastasia, and all Thy Saints: into whose company, not weighing our merits, but granting us pardon, we beseech Thee to admit us. Through Christ our Lord.	Nobis quoque peccatoribus famulis tuis, de multitudine miserationum tuarum sperantibus, partem aliquam et societatem donare digneris cum tuis sanctis Apostolis et Martyribus: cum Ioanne, Stephano, Matthia, Barnaba, (Ignatio, Alexandro, Marcellino, Petro, Felicitate, Perpetua, Agatha, Lucia, Agnete, Cæcilia, Anastasia) et omnibus Sanctis tuis: intra quorum nos consortium, non æstimator meriti, sed veniæ, quæsumus, largitor admítte. Per Christum Dominum nostrum.	To us, also, your servants, who, though sinners, hope in your abundant mercies, graciously grant some share and fellowship with your holy Apostles and Martyrs: with John the Baptist, Stephen, Matthias, Barnabas, (Ignatius, Alexander, Marcellinus, Peter, Felicity, Perpetua, Agatha, Lucy, Agnes, Cecilia, Anastasia) and all your Saints; admit us, we beseech you, into their company, not weighing our merits, but granting us your pardon, through Christ our Lord.

Apart from a minuscule matter of punctuation, the texts differ only in the bracketing of the saints not mentioned in the New Testament and whose names the priest may in the 1970 form choose either to include or to omit. The full list consists of John the Baptist, seven male and seven female saints.

The rubrics in all forms of the Roman Canon indicate that the priest who recites the prayer (a concelebrant in a concelebrated Mass) strikes his breast when saying the first three words, "Nobis quoque peccatoribus", and that he then continues with hands extended. Concelebrants also strike their breast at the same words.

These are the only words between the Sanctus and the closing "Per omnia sæcula sæculorum" that, in the 1962 Canon, the priest speaks audibly enough to be heard by anyone other than himself; even then he does so only "raising his voice a little", and only at Low Mass. In the 1970 Canon every word is to be spoken "in a loud and clear voice" and "it is very appropriate that the priest sing those parts for which musical notation is provided".

== Per quem hæc omnia ==
1962 and 1970 Latin text	1902 English translation
Per quem hæc omnia, Domine, semper bona creas, sanctificas, vivificas, benedicis, et præstas nobis.	By whom, O Lord, Thou dost always create, sanctify, vivify, bless, and bestow upon us all these good things.

This short prayer, spoken by the principal celebrant in a concelebrated Mass, grammatically continues the preceding prayer, whose final "Per Christum Dominum nostrum" is not followed by a concluding "Amen.".

The 1962 rubrics instruct the priest to make the sign of the cross over host and chalice together when saying each of the three verbs "sanctificas, vivificas, benedicis".

== Per ipsum ==
1962 and 1970 Latin text	1902 English translation
Per ipsum, et cum ipso, et in ipso, est tibi Deo Patri omnipotenti, in unitate Spiritus Sancti, omnis honor et gloria per omnia sæcula sæculorum.	Through Him, and with Him, and in Him is unto Thee, God the Father Almighty, in the unity of the Holy Ghost, all honor and glory: world without end.

The 1970 Canon indicates that the "Amen" response should be given by the people. The 1962 Canon does not specify.

According to the 1970 rubrics, the priest sings or recites the prayer while raising the chalice and the paten with the host. If a deacon participates, he raises the chalice while the priest raises the paten with the host.

The ceremonial of the 1962 rubrics is more complex: the priest uncovers the chalice, genuflects, takes the host between his right thumb and forefinger and, holding the chalice in his left hand, with the host makes the sign of the cross three times from lip to lip of the chalice, while saying inaudibly: "Per ipsum, et cum ipso, et in ipso"; he then with the host makes the sign of the cross twice in the space between him and the chalice, saying: "est tibi Deo Patri omnipotenti, in unitate Spiritus Sancti"; next he raises chalice and host slightly, while saying: "omnis honor et gloria"; finally he replaces the host on the corporal, covers the chalice with the pall, genuflects, stands up, and says in a voice that can be understood or sings: "Per omnia sæcula sæculorum."

== See also ==
- Canon of the Mass
- History of the Roman Canon
- Mass
- Pre-Tridentine Mass
- Tridentine Mass
- Mass of Paul VI
- English Missal
