= Memorial Acclamation =

Acclamation sung in the Eucharist

The Memorial Acclamation is an acclamation sung or recited by the people after the institution narrative of the Eucharist. They were common in ancient eastern liturgies and have more recently been introduced into Roman Catholic, Lutheran, Anglican and Methodist liturgies. The acclamation references the memorial aspect of the Eucharist, taught by Jesus at the Last Supper: "Do this, as often as you drink it, in remembrance of me" (1 Corinthians 11:25). It is additionally linked with the pattern of the anamnesis, which is "that of the Lord's death, resurrection and ascension", along with the Second Coming.

== Liturgy of St James ==
The Liturgy of St James is the principal liturgy of the Syriac Orthodox Church, Syriac Catholic Church, Syro-Malankara Catholic Church, Maronite Church, and Malankara Orthodox Church. It is also occasionally used in the Eastern Orthodox Church and Melkite Catholic Church and other Eastern Catholic Churches of Byzantine Rite.

In the Syriac form of this liturgy, after the Words of Institution, to which the people respond with "Amen" after the formula for the blessing of the bread and again after the formula for the blessing of the chalice, the priest celebrant says: "Do in remembrance of Me when you partake of this sacrament, commemorating My death and My resurrection until I come." The people then respond with the acclamation: "Your death, our Lord, we commemorate, Your resurrection we confess and Your second coming we wait for. May Your mercy be upon us all."

In the Byzantine form of the Liturgy of St James, the priest celebrant says: "This do in remembrance of me; for as often as ye eat this bread, and drink this cup, ye do show forth the Lord's death, and confess His resurrection, till He comes." The people respond: "We show forth Thy death, O Lord, and confess Thy resurrection."

== Alexandrian Rite ==
The Alexandrian Rite is the liturgical rite of the Coptic Orthodox Church. The Memorial Acclamation is present within the conclusion of the Institution Narrative of all three liturgies of the rite, which are the Liturgy of St. Cyril, the Liturgy of St. Basil, and the Liturgy of St. Gregory. The memorial acclamation is made up of a short prayer by the priest followed by a congregational response. These two parts are commonly referred to as the Anamnesis to distinguish them from the Epiclesis and the other segments of the Institution Narrative. As with many Alexandrian prayers the priest prays in Coptic while the congregation responds in Greek.

Ⲡⲓⲟⲩⲏⲃ:

Ⲥⲟⲡ ⲅⲁⲣ ⲛⲓⲃⲉⲛ ⲉ̀ⲧⲉⲧⲉⲛⲛⲁⲟⲩⲱⲙ ⲉ̀ⲃⲟⲗ ϧⲉⲛ ⲡⲁⲓⲱⲓⲕ ⲫⲁⲓ: ⲟⲩⲟϩ ⲛ̀ⲧⲉⲧⲉⲛⲥⲱ ⲉ̀ⲃⲟⲗ ϧⲉⲛ ⲡⲁⲓⲁ̀ⲫⲟⲧ ⲫⲁⲓ: ⲉ̀ⲣⲉ ⲧⲉⲛϩⲓⲱⲓϣ ⲙ̀ⲡⲁⲙⲟⲩ: ⲉ̀ⲣⲉ ⲧⲉⲛⲉⲣⲟ̀ⲙⲟⲗⲟⲅⲓⲛ ⲛ̀ⲧⲁⲁ̀ⲛⲁⲥⲧⲁⲥⲓⲥ: ⲉ̀ⲣⲉ ⲧⲉⲛⲓ̀ⲣⲓ ⲙ̀ⲡⲁⲙⲉⲩⲓ ϣⲁϯⲓ̀.

Translation:
Priest:

For every time you eat of this bread and drink of this cup, you proclaim My Death, confess My Resurrection, and remember Me till I come.

Ⲡⲓⲗⲁⲟⲥ:

Ⲁ̀ⲙⲏⲛ ⲁ̀ⲙⲏⲛ ⲁ̀ⲙⲏⲛ: ⲧⲟⲛ ⲑⲁⲛⲁⲧⲟⲛ ⲥⲟⲩ Ⲕⲩⲣⲓⲉ ⲕⲁⲧⲁⲅⲅⲉⲗⲗⲟⲙⲉⲛ: ⲕⲉ ⲧⲏⲛ ⲁ̀ⲅⲓⲁⲛ ⲥⲟⲩ ⲁ̀ⲛⲁⲥⲧⲁⲥⲓⲛ ⲕⲉ ⲧⲏⲛ ⲁ̀ⲛⲁⲗⲏⲯⲓⲛ ⲥⲟⲩ ⲛ̀ⲧⲏⲥ ⲟⲩⲣⲁⲛⲓⲥ ⲥⲉ ⲟ̀ⲙⲟⲗⲟⲅⲟⲩⲙⲉⲛ.
Ⲥⲉ ⲉ̀ⲛⲟⲩⲙⲉⲛ ⲥⲉ ⲉⲩⲗⲟⲅⲟⲩⲙⲉⲛ ⲥⲓ ⲉⲩⲭⲁⲣⲓⲥⲧⲟⲩⲙⲉⲛ Ⲕⲩⲣⲓⲉ: ⲕⲉ ⲇⲉⲟ̀ⲙⲉⲑⲁ ⲥⲟⲩ ⲟ̀ Ⲑⲉⲟⲥ ⲏ̀ⲙⲱⲛ.

Translation:
People:

Amen. Amen. Amen. Your Death, O Lord, we proclaim; Your holy Resurrection and Ascension into the heavens, we confess.
We praise You, we bless You, we thank You O Lord, and we entreat You, O our God.

== Roman Rite ==
The Memorial Acclamation was introduced into the Roman Rite of Mass in 1969 as part of the revision of the Roman Missal by Pope Paul VI. Previously the only acclamations by the people in the eucharistic prayer were the Sanctus and the Amen to the final doxology.

=== The three acclamations ===
The three acclamations given in the Roman Missal are, in the official English translation, as follows:

We proclaim your Death, O Lord,
and profess your Resurrection,
until you come again.

When we eat this Bread and drink this Cup,
we proclaim your Death, O Lord,
until you come again.

Save us, Saviour of the world,
for by your Cross and Resurrection
you have set us free.

The initial edition of the Roman Missal in English, which in part was a more dynamic rather than literal translation of the original, had instead the following four acclamations:

- Christ has died, Christ is risen, Christ will come again.
- Dying you destroyed our death, rising you restored our life. Lord Jesus, come in glory.
- When we eat this bread and drink this cup, we proclaim your death, Lord Jesus, until you come in glory.
- Lord, by your cross and resurrection, you have set us free. You are the Saviour of the world.

=== Mysterium fidei ===
As a lead to the Memorial Acclamation, the priest says or sings: "The mystery of faith".

This introductory phrase, mysterium fidei in the Latin original, was previously translated loosely into English as "Let us proclaim the mystery of faith", and in some places was sung or spoken by the deacon instead of the priest in spite of the clear instruction in the Missal itself and in the apostolic constitution Missale Romanum with which Pope Paul VI promulgated the revision of the Roman Missal. The English translation was corrected in 2011 and now reads simply: "The mystery of faith".

==== Mysterium fidei in the Tridentine Mass ====
Before the 1969 revision of the Roman Missal, the phrase mysterium fidei was included in the formula of consecration of the wine spoken inaudibly by the priest, appearing as follows (here accompanied by an unofficial English translation):

Text (in Latin)

Simili modo postquam cenatum est,
accipiens et hunc praeclarum calicem
in sanctas ac venerabiles manus suas:
item tibi gratias agens, benedixit,
deditque discipulis suis, dicens:
Accipite, et bibite ex eo omnes.
Hic est enim calix sanguinis mei,
novi et aeterni testamenti:
mysterium fidei:
qui pro vobis et pro multis effundetur
in remissionem peccatorum.
Haec quotiescumque feceritis,
in mei memoriam facietis.

Unofficial English translation

In like manner, after He had supped,
taking also into His holy and venerable hands
this goodly chalice,
again giving thanks to Thee, He blessed it,
and gave it to His disciples, saying:
Take and drink ye all of this:
For this is the chalice of My blood,
of the new and eternal testament:
the mystery of faith:
which will be shed for you and for many
unto the remission of sins.
As often as ye shall do these things,
ye shall do them in remembrance of me.

Some traditionalist Catholics have criticised the removal of the phrase mysterium fidei from the words of consecration.

=== Meaning of the phrase mysterium fidei in context ===
The phrase mysterium fidei was added to the words of consecration at some time before the 6th century, perhaps by Pope Leo I (440-461) and perhaps, in reaction to the denial by Manichaeism of the goodness of material things, as an expression of the Catholic Church's belief that salvation comes through Christ's material blood and through participation in the sacrament, which makes use of a material element.

The memorial acclamations that follow suggest that "the mystery of faith" refers, in its new context, to "the entire mystery of salvation through Christ's death, resurrection and ascension, which is made present in the celebration of the Eucharist". An alternative memorial acclamation permitted in Ireland, "My Lord and my God", was disapproved of by Pope Paul VI for seemingly concentrating on the real presence of Christ in the Eucharist rather than on Eucharistic sacrifice as a whole, but even this may be interpreted in the same sense, since it is a repetition of what in John 20:28 refers to Christ as risen and as still bearing the marks of his suffering.

== Lutheran Rite ==
Lutherans have the Memorial Acclamation:

For whenever you eat this bread and drink this cup, you proclaim the Lord’s death until He comes.

== Anglican Rite ==
In its 1979 version of the Book of Common Prayer, the Episcopal Church (United States) has in Prayer B the acclamation:

We remember his death
We proclaim his resurrection
We await his coming in glory

In three of its Rite 2 eucharistic prayers, the acclamation is made by celebrant and people together.

The Book of Alternative Services of the Anglican Church of Canada has a Memorial Acclamation, as have some United Methodist churches.

== See also ==
- Anamnesis (Christianity)
- Anaphora (liturgy)
- Divine Liturgy
- Divine Service (Lutheran)
- Mass (music)
- Text and rubrics of the Roman Canon
