= Mixed chalice =

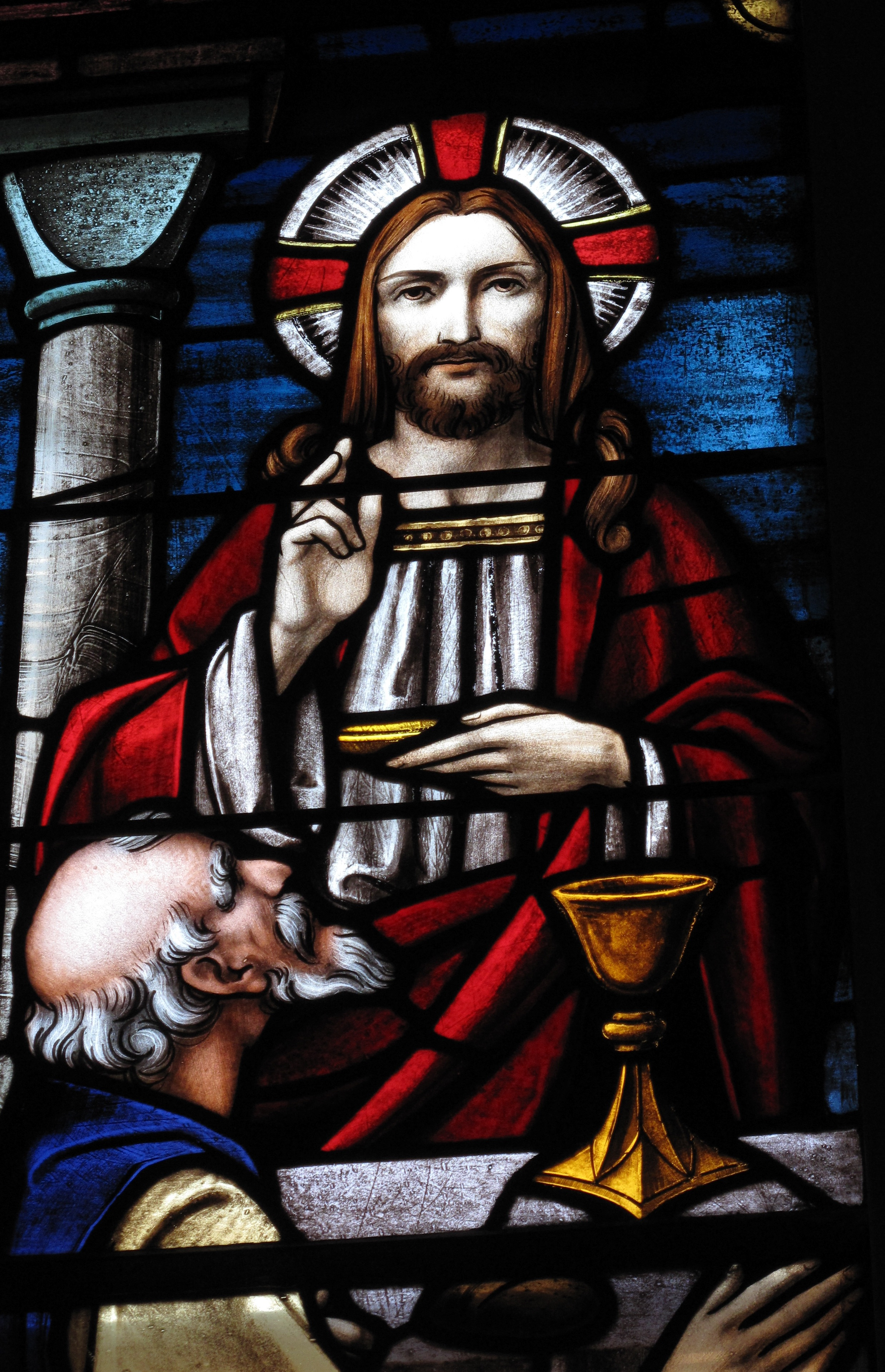
Christ with paten and chalice depicted in a stained-glass window at St. Matthew's German Evangelical Lutheran Church in South Carolina

In the Christian sacrament of the Eucharist, the mixed chalice denotes the mingling of water and wine in the cup.

In the modern Roman rite of the Catholic Church, the mingling happens during the offertory. The Deacon (or Priest if there is no Deacon present) pours wine and a little water into the chalice, saying quietly "By the mystery of this water and wine may we come to share in the divinity of Christ who humbled himself to share our humanity".

In the Byzantine rite, the chalice is mixed twice; one as in the Western rite, the other when hot water is added at the commixture. The reason for this is unknown, but is said to symbolise the fervency of faith and the descent of the Holy Spirit.

The practice likely originated from the ordinary practice in the ancient Middle East of watering down wine for consumption, which would have been the usual custom of Jesus and his disciples. However, as is the case for most liturgical developments, symbolism was attached to unelaborated action over time. Various symbolisms have been associated with the mixed chalice: the union of Christ with his people; the blood and water said to have flowed from Christ's side on the cross (John 19.34); or the union of the Divine and human natures of Christ.

== See also ==
- Eucharistic theology
- Mass (liturgy)
