= Anamnesis (Christianity) =

Liturgical statement in Christianity

Anamnesis (from the Attic Greek word ἀνάμνησις, lit. 'reminiscence' or 'memorial sacrifice') is a liturgical statement in Christianity in which the Church refers to the memorial character of the Eucharist or to the Passion, Resurrection and Ascension of Jesus. It has its origin in Jesus' words at the Last Supper, "Do this in memory of me" ("τοῦτο ποιεῖτε εἰς τὴν ἐμὴν ἀνάμνησιν"), (Luke 22:19, 1 Corinthians 11:24-25).

Anamnesis is also a key concept in the liturgical theology: in worship, Christians recall God's saving deeds. This memorial aspect is not simply a passive process but one by which the Christian can actually enter into the Paschal mystery.

== In Eucharistic prayers ==
Almost all Eucharistic prayers (or anaphoras) contain an anamnesis. This part of the anaphora is usually placed after the consecration, i.e. after the account of the Last Supper in which are pronounced the Words of Institution spoken by Jesus. The Words of Institution are usually ended by the sentence "Do this in memory of me", which meaning is thus prepared and immediately taken up by the following anamnesis.

For example, in the Divine Liturgy of Saint John Chrysostom, the anamnesis is:

Μεμνημένοι τοίνυν τῆς σωτηρίου ταύτης ἐντολῆς καὶ πάντων τῶν ὑπὲρ ἡμῶν γεγενημένων, τοῦ Σταυροῦ, τοῦ τάφου, τῆς τριημέρου ἀναστάσεως, τῆς εἰς οὐρανοὺς ἀναβάσεως, τῆς ἐκ δεξιῶν καθέδρας, τῆς δευτέρας καὶ ἐνδόξου πάλιν παρουσίας, Τὰ σὰ ἐκ τῶν σῶν σοὶ προσφέρομεν κατὰ πάντα καὶ διὰ πάντα.

Remembering, therefore, this command of the Saviour and all that came to pass for our sake, the cross, the tomb, the resurrection on the third day, the ascension into heaven, the enthronement at the right hand of the Father and the second, glorious coming, Thine own of Thine own we offer unto Thee, on behalf of all and for all.

In the Western Roman Canon, the wording of the anamnesis is:

Unde et memores, Domine, nos servi tui, sed et plebs tua sancta, eiusdem Christi Filii tui Domini nostri tam beatae passionis, necnon et ab inferis resurrectionis, sed et in coelos gloriosae ascensionis: offerimus praeclarae maiestati tuae de tuis donis, ac datis hostiam puram, hostiam sanctam, hostiam immaculatam, Panem sanctum vitae aeternae, et Calicem salutis perpetuae.

Wherefore, O Lord, we Thy servants, as also Thy holy people, calling to mind the blessed Passion of the same Christ, Thy Son, our Lord, and also His Resurrection from the dead and His glorious Ascension into heaven: do offer unto Thy most excellent Majesty of Thine own gifts, bestowed upon us, a pure Host, a holy Host, an unspotted Host, the holy Bread of eternal life, and the Chalice of everlasting salvation.

In the Byzantine Rite, other services besides the Divine Liturgy will have an anamnesis, such as the Great Sanctification of Waters at Theophany. An Episcopal Dictionary of the Church says of the anamnesis: "This memorial prayer of remembrance recalls for the worshiping community past events in their tradition of faith that are formative for their identity and self-understanding" and makes particular mention of its place in "the various eucharistic prayers".

== See also ==
- Memorial Acclamation
- Transubstantiation
