= Mass of the Catechumens =

"Mass (or Liturgy) of the Catechumens" is an ancient title for the first half of the Catholic Mass or Eastern Orthodox Divine Liturgy. In the Mass of Paul VI of the Catholic Church, it is referred to as the Liturgy of the Word. It was originally called the Mass of the Catechumens, because the Catechumens, or candidates for Baptism, were required to leave the ceremony before the beginning of the Liturgy of the Eucharist, or Mass, proper.

This exclusion was enforced on the grounds that, until Baptism, persons were not fully members of the Church and should not participate in the communal sacrifice that symbolizes and embodies the spiritual union of the Faithful, according to Catholic belief.

In the earliest liturgy, there was a service consisting of readings, a homily (explanation of the readings and how to apply them to one's life) and petitionary prayers based on the readings and homily (bidding prayers or prayers of the faithful).

== See also ==
- Tridentine Mass
