= Words of Institution =

Eucharist liturgies sometimes using the phase

The Words of Institution, also called the Words of Consecration, are words echoing those of Jesus himself at his Last Supper so that, when consecrating bread and wine, Christian eucharistic liturgies include in a narrative of that event. Eucharistic scholars sometimes refer to them simply as the verba (Latin for "words").

Almost all existing ancient Christian churches explicitly include the Words of Institution in their eucharistic celebrations and consider them necessary for the validity of the sacrament. This is the practice of the Catholic Church's Latin liturgical rites and Eastern Catholic liturgies, the Eastern Orthodox Church, and all the Oriental Orthodox Churches, including the Armenian, the Coptic, the Ethiopian and the Malankara, as well as the Anglican Communion, Lutheran churches, Methodist churches, and Reformed churches. The only ancient eucharistic ritual still in use that does not explicitly contain the Words of Institution is the Holy Qurbana of Addai and Mari, used for part of the year by the Church of the East denominations, namely Assyrian Church of the East, Ancient Church of the East, and the Chaldean Syrian Church, due to their tradition of using the Holy Leaven. The Chaldean Catholic Church and the Syro-Malabar Church, two of the Eastern Catholic Churches, use the same Anaphora, but insert in it the Words of Institution. However, groups authorized by the Catholic Church to review the Qurbana recognized the validity of this eucharistic celebration in its original form, without explicit mention of the Words of Institution, saying that "the words of Eucharistic Institution are indeed present in the Anaphora of Addai and Mari, not in a coherent narrative way and ad litteram, but rather in a dispersed euchological way, that is, integrated in successive prayers of thanksgiving, praise and intercession."

No formula of Words of Institution in any liturgy is claimed to be an exact reproduction of words that Jesus used, presumably in the Aramaic language, at his Last Supper. The formulas generally combine words from the Gospels of Mark, Matthew and Luke and the Pauline account in 1 Corinthians 11:24–25. They may even insert other words, such as the phrase "Mysterium fidei", which for many centuries was found within the Roman Rite's Words of Institution, until that phrase was placed after it in 1970, and has a counterpart in the Syrian liturgy's τὸ μυστήριον τῆς καινῆς διαθήκης ("the mystery of the new covenant").

== Early liturgies ==
There is no consensus among scholars whether the Words of Institution were used in the celebrations of the Eucharist during the first two or three centuries or if their use was only sporadic. In her study, The Function of the Words of Institution in the Celebration of the Lord's Supper, Ros Clarke refers to evidence that suggests that Words of Institution were not used in the celebration during the 2nd century. She says that the evidence from the early church suggests that the words of institution were not then used liturgically, but only catechetically, and so the narrative of the Last Supper was not used in celebrating the Eucharist. What was essential, she says, was the ritual, consisting of the four actions of taking bread, giving thanks, breaking it, and giving it to be eaten, accompanying the actions by saying some words identifying the bread with Jesus' body, and similarly with respect to the cup. Father Robert Taft concludes that, although there were not extant pre-Nicene (325 AD) Eucharistic prayers that contained the Words of Institution, "the eucharistic gifts were consecrated in the eucharistic prayer." Ludwig Ott points to the First Apology of Justin Martyr from c. 155 AD which states "we have been taught, the food over which thanksgiving (Eucharist) has been made by the prayer of the Word which came from Him [Christ] is both flesh and blood of that same incarnate Jesus" and "by words stemming from Him [Christ]". From a Catholic dogmatic viewpoint, Ott's thesis is supported, while Taft's conclusion seemingly contradicts the mid-16th-century Council of Trent, which declared the Words of Institution necessary for the confection of the Sacrament.

== Uses in present Christianity ==
=== Roman Rite of the Catholic Church ===
The Words of Institution of the Roman Rite Mass are here presented in the official English translation of the Roman Missal, firstly in the obsolete first and second editions of the Roman Missal, and secondly in as they are translated in the current third edition of the Roman Missal. The distinction here made by bolding is not found in the Missals.

1.
Take this, all of you, and eat of it:
this is my Body, which will be given up for you.

Take this, all of you, and drink from it:
this is the cup of my blood,
the blood of the new and everlasting covenant.
It will be shed for you and for all,
so that sins may be forgiven.
Do this in memory of me.

2.
Take this, all of you, and eat of it,
for this is my Body,
which will be given up for you.

Take this, all of you, and drink from it,
for this is the chalice of my Blood,
the Blood of the new and eternal covenant,
which will be poured out for you and for many
for the forgiveness of sins.
Do this in memory of me.

From the time of Peter Lombard on, the prevailing theology of the Catholic Church considered the eight words in bold above to be on their own the necessary and sufficient "sacramental form" of the Eucharist. Pope Eugene IV's Decree for the Armenians, issued after the Council of Florence, declared: "The words of the Savior, by which He instituted this sacrament, are the form of this sacrament; for the priest speaking in the person of Christ effects this sacrament. For by the power of the very words the substance of the bread is changed into the body of Christ, and the substance of the wine into the blood". The Decree did not limit the words to the eight in bold, but was popularly taken to mean that, on their own, they are all that is needed for effecting the sacrament.

The theological opinion about the necessity and sufficiency of pronouncing certain parts of the Words of Institution (the eight words bolded in the English translation given above) is not included in, for instance, the Catechism of the Catholic Church, published in definitive form in 1997. On 17 January 2001 the Congregation for the Doctrine of the Faith declared that the Holy Qurbana of Addai and Mari, a probably second-century anaphora in which the Words of Institution are not spoken, "can be considered valid." The Guidelines for Admission to the Eucharist between the Chaldean Church and the Assyrian Church of the East issued by the Pontifical Council for Promoting Christian Unity in agreement with the Congregation for the Doctrine of the Faith and the Congregation for the Oriental Churches on 20 July 2001 say that "the words of the institution of the Eucharist are in fact present in the anaphora of Addai and Mari, not in the form of a coherent narration and in a literal way but in a euchological and disseminated manner, that is to say they are integrated in the prayers of thanksgiving, praise and intercession which follow." These prayers in fact speak of "the commemoration of the Body and Blood of your Christ, which we offer to you on the pure and holy altar, as you have taught us in his life-giving Gospel."

It has therefore been argued that it is the prayer as a whole, not some isolated words within it, that is efficacious in the sacrament, and that the Words of Institution that Jesus himself spoke at his Last Supper are consecratory at every Eucharist, whether they are repeated or only implied, in accordance with the teaching of John Chrysostom: "That saying, 'This is my body', once uttered, from that time to the present day, and even until Christ's coming, makes the sacrifice complete at every table in the churches."

While thus accepting as valid the Anaphora of Addai and Mari even when the Words of Institution are not explicitly spoken, the document of the Pontifical Council for Promoting Christian Unity "warmly invites" an Assyrian priest celebrating the Eucharist when Chaldean Christians are participating to insert the Words of Institution in that circumstance, as permitted by the Assyrian Church itself.

=== Byzantine Rite Churches ===
In Eastern Orthodox and Eastern Catholic Churches, the Words of Institution are a prominent audible part of the Anaphora, much of which the priest prays silently. These words are:

For the bread: "Take, eat: this is My Body, which is broken for you for the remission of sins."

For the wine: "Drink of it, all of you: this is My Blood of the New Testament, which is shed for you and for many, for the remission of sins."

Eastern Christian theology does not isolate the Words of Institution as the sole moment the Eucharistic gifts (the bread and wine) are changed into the Body and Blood of Christ. Instead of defining a precise moment, the tradition views the entire Anaphora as a single, integrated consecratory prayer. This process finds its culmination in the Epiclesis, the invocation of the Holy Spirit upon the gifts. While some Church Fathers, such as Saint John Chrysostom, refer to the Words of Institution as effecting the sacrament, this is understood within the context of the whole liturgical action rather than as a standalone formula.

The Liturgy of the Presanctified Gifts does not contain the Words of Institution. This service is a solemn form of Vespers where the faithful receive communion from the Reserved Mysteries consecrated at a previous Divine Liturgy, typically on the preceding Sunday. The name "Pre-sanctified" indicates that the gifts were consecrated beforehand.

=== Oriental Rite Churches ===
In Oriental Orthodox Churches, liturgies generally have the Words of Institution in the Anaphora. The Egyptian liturgy of St. Basil, the most common liturgy among Coptic Christians in Egypt, has the Words of Institution right before the Epiclesis. Although, the Words of Institution were considered consecratory by some Coptic Patriarchs in the past, the general historic view (especially in Egypt) sees that the consecration spans the entirety of the liturgy, culminating in the Epiclesis.

=== Protestant denominations ===
Protestant denominations generally, with the exception of the Anglican Communion and Lutheranism, rely exclusively on the words of Paul as recorded in 1 Corinthians 11:23-26. (ESV):

For I received from the Lord what I also delivered to you, that the Lord Jesus on the night when he was betrayed took bread,
and when he had given thanks, he broke it, and said, 'This is my body which is for you. Do this in remembrance of me.
In the same way also he took the cup, after supper, saying, 'This cup is the new covenant in my blood. Do this, as often as you drink it, in remembrance of me.
For as often as you eat this bread and drink the cup, you proclaim the Lord's death until he comes.

Protestantism has typically utilized the words of institution as a central part of its Communion service, though precise traditions vary by denomination. The debate over the force and literalness of the words of institution underlies the arguments between a symbolic, memorialist view of the Lord's Supper as found in a variety of Protestant denominations, a sacramental union, as with the Lutheran Churches, and a pneumatic presence, as with the Reformed Churches. Most of the established churches in the Protestant tradition employ a mirroring of Paul's words surrounding the words of institution, while Congregationalist and Baptist churches use the words themselves without the full citation of Paul's wording.

==== Anglican Communion ====
The following version of the Words of Institution is found in the 1662 Book of Common Prayer commonly used in the Anglican Communion:

[Who], in the same night that he was betrayed, took bread; and when he had given thanks, he brake it, and gave it to his disciples, saying, Take, eat; this is my Body, which is given for you: Do this in remembrance of me. Likewise, after supper, he took the Cup; and, when he had given thanks, he gave it to them, saying, Drink ye all of this; for this is my Blood of the New Testament, which is shed for you and for many, for the remission of sins: Do this, as oft as ye shall drink it, in remembrance of me.

==== Lutheran Churches ====
The Lutheran liturgy differs from that of other Protestants by using a conflation of the four versions of the words of institution. Luther's Small Catechism shows this,

Our Lord Jesus Christ, on the night when he was betrayed, took the bread, and when he had given thanks, he broke it and gave it to his disciples and said: Take; eat; this is my body which is given for you. Do this in remembrance of me. In the same way he also took the cup after the supper, and when he had given thanks, he gave it to them saying, Drink of it, all of you. This cup is the New Testament in my blood, shed for you for the forgiveness of sins. Do this, as often as you drink it, in remembrance of me.

By doing so, they include the phrase "My blood, which is shed for you for the forgiveness of sins..." This reflects Lutheran sacramental theology in which the sacrament is a means of grace and actively forgives sins.

==== Presbyterian Churches ====
The following version of the Words of Institution is found in the Book of Common Worship and is used among those in the Presbyterian Church USA:

Breaking of the Bread

The Lord Jesus, on the night of his arrest, took bread,
and after giving thanks to God,
he broke it, and gave it to his disciples, saying:
Take, eat.
This is my body, given for you.
Do this in remembrance of me.
In the same way he took the cup, saying:
This cup is the new covenant sealed in my blood,
shed for you for the forgiveness of sins.
Whenever you drink it,
do this in remembrance of me.
Every time you eat this bread and drink this cup
you proclaim the saving death of the risen Lord,
until he comes.

==== Methodist Churches ====
Current trends in Methodist thought would require both the verba and an epiclesis for a Prayer of Thanksgiving, which bridges Western and Eastern thought.

== Bibliography ==
- Cross, F. L., ed. The Oxford Dictionary of the Christian Church. London: Oxford UP, 1974.
