= Marriage in the Eastern Orthodox Church =

Religious sacrament

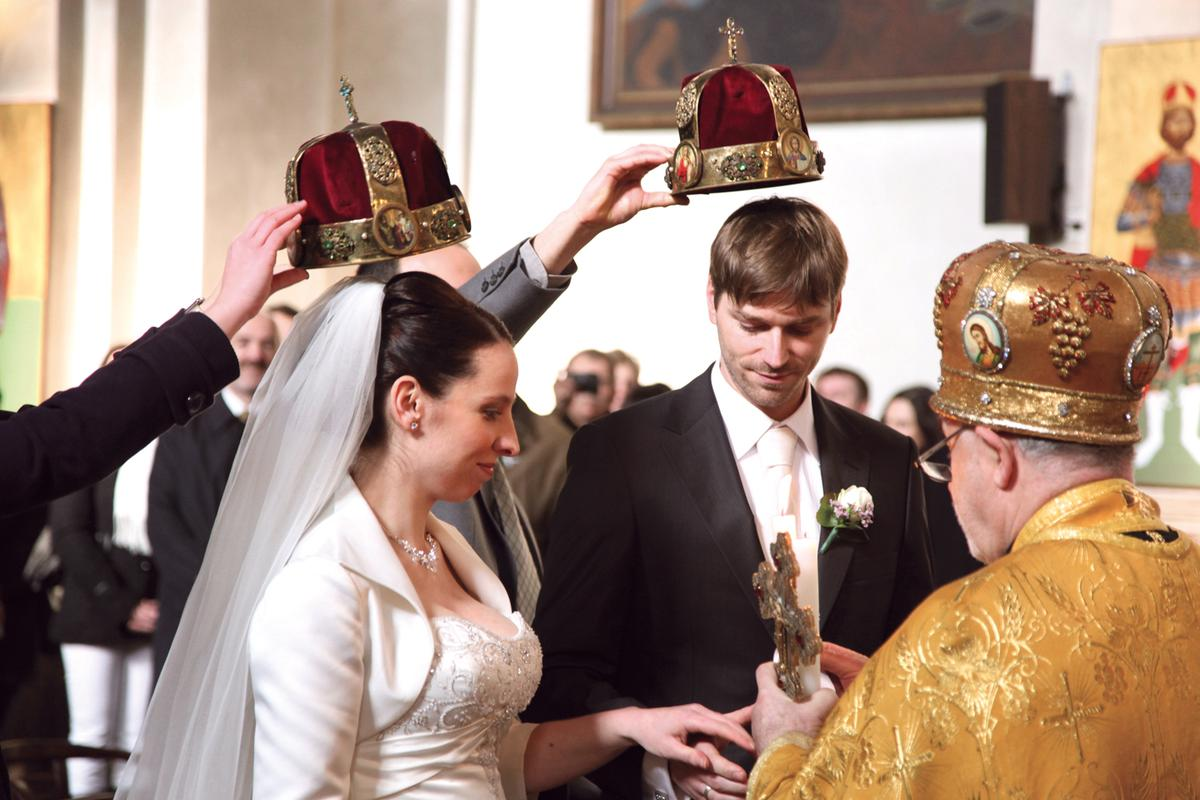
Mystery of Crowning during a wedding in the Church of Ss. Cyril and Methodius in Prague, Czechia

Marriage in the Eastern Orthodox Church is a holy mystery (sacrament) in the Eastern Orthodox Church performed by a priest to unite in marriage a man and a woman. In the Byzantine Rite liturgy for Matrimony, the couple is crowned.

== Main process ==
There are a handful of different steps that come into play for a marriage ceremony in the Eastern Orthodox denomination, although the main two pieces include the betrothal (engagement) and the crowning (marriage). Weddings in the Eastern Orthodox tradition have a sponsor present, known as a koumbaro (Greek: κουμπάρος).

=== The Rite of Betrothal ===
The couple will exchange rings first, as a voluntary pledge to enter into eventual marriage. The priest will bless the bride and groom three times each. The rings are placed on the ring finger of the right hand. The priest will mention the Prodigal Son in his prayer. The priest will recite Psalm 128.

=== The Rite of Crowning ===
The second stage, the Mystery of Crowning, is the more official part of the wedding. The liturgy of the Mystery of Crowning involves the placement of crowns on both heads of the couple in a lengthy ceremony, which is preceded by a betrothal ceremony. The bride and groom are both given candles. After some more prayers by the priest, the priest will join the right hands of both the bride and groom. He will recite "O' Sovereign Lord, stretch forth Your hand from Your holy dwelling place and join together Your servant (Groom) and Your handmaiden (Bride), for by You is a wife joined to her husband. Join them together in oneness of mind; crown them with wedlock into one flesh; grant to them the fruit of the womb and the gain of well-favored children."

After a blessing, the priest will crown the couple. He will say three times, the priest says, “The servant of God (GROOM) is crowned for the handmaiden of God (BRIDE) in the name of the Father, and of the Son, and of the Holy Spirit.” The brief hymn, “Lord our God, crown them with glory and honor” is sung. The couple will exchange the crowns three times. If the bride wears a veil, the crown is simply placed atop her veil. There are two readings from the New Testament. The first is from St. Paul’s Epistle to the Ephesians (5:20-33), where the priest exhorts married couples “to be subject to one another out of reverence for Christ.” The second reading is from the Gospel of John (2:1-11).

After a recitation of the Lord's Prayer, the couple will drink from a common cup, three times each. Traditional practice involves wine, although some may opt to replace it with grape juice. The priest, holding the Book of the Gospels, will lead the couple around the table three times, singing three hymns. The priest removes the crowns, saying “Accept their crowns in Your kingdom unsoiled and undefiled, and preserve them without offense to the ages of ages.” He tells them to “Go forth in peace”.

== See also ==
- Russian wedding traditions
