= East Syriac Rite =

Christian religious rite

East Syriac Cross

The East Syriac Rite, or East Syrian Rite (also called the Edessan Rite, Assyrian Rite, Persian Rite, Chaldean Rite, Nestorian Rite, Babylonian Rite or Syro-Oriental Rite), is an Eastern Christian liturgical rite that employs the Divine Liturgy of Saints Addai and Mari and utilizes the East Syriac dialect as its liturgical language. It is one of the two main liturgical rites of Syriac Christianity, along with the West Syriac Rite (Syro-Antiochene Rite).

The East Syriac Rite originated in Edessa, Mesopotamia, and was historically used in the Church of the East, the largest branch of Christianity operating primarily east of the Roman Empire: there are groups of adherents as far as South India, Central and Inner Asia, and a strong presence in the Sasanian (Persian) Empire. The Church of the East traces its origins to the 1st century, when Saint Thomas the Apostle and his disciples Saint Addai and Saint Mari brought the faith to ancient Mesopotamia (today's modern Iraq, eastern Syria, southeastern Turkey, and regions along the Turkish–Syrian and Iran–Iraq borders). According to traditional accounts, Thomas the Apostle is believed to have traveled as far as the Malabar coast of southwestern India. This account is not yet confirmed, as the earliest-record for an organised Christian presence in India is from the 6th century account of Alexandrian traveller Cosmas Indicopleustes.

The East Syriac rite remains in use within churches descended from the Church of the East, namely the Assyrian Church of the East of Iraq (including its archdiocese, the Chaldean Syrian Church of India) and the Ancient Church of the East, as well as in two Eastern Catholic churches, the Chaldean Catholic Church of Iraq and the Syro-Malabar Church of India, which are both now in full communion with the See of Rome. The words of Institution are missing in the original version of the Liturgy of Saints Addai and Mari. However, the Eastern Catholic churches have added-in the words of Institution in their version of the liturgy.

Although Nestorius was condemned in 431 AD through the Council of Ephesus (resulting in a schism with the Catholic Church), the Assyrian Church Patriarch Mar Dinkha IV and Pope John Paul II signed a common declaration at the Vatican in 1994; the Common Christological Declaration (1994) document asserted that the split that occurred due to the Council of Ephesus in 431 AD was "due in large part to misunderstandings," affirmed for both that "Christ is true God and true man," recognized "each other as sister Churches" and vowed to resolve remaining differences. In 2001, the committee, established from the 1994 dialogue, drew-up guidelines for mutual admission to the Eucharist between the Chaldean Catholic Church and the Assyrian Church of the East, overcoming all other issues.

== Usage ==
Versions of the East Syriac Rite are currently used by Churches descended from the erstwhile Church of the East:

- Assyrian/Chaldean Rite:
  - Holy Apostolic Catholic Assyrian Church of the East based in Iraq.
    - Chaldean Syrian Church of India based in India, an archbishopric of the Assyrian Church of the East.
  - Ancient Church of the East based in Iraq, an autocephalous Eastern church, that separated from the Assyrian Church of the East in 1964.
  - Chaldean Catholic Church an Eastern Catholic Church in full communion with Rome, based in Bagdad, Iraq
- Syro-Malabaric Rite
  - Syro-Malabar Catholic Church, an Eastern Catholic Church in full communion with Rome, based in India.

The variety of terms used as designations for the rite reflects its complex history and consequent denominational diversity. The common term East Syriac Rite is based on the liturgical use of East Syriac dialect, and other terms reflect particular historical and denominational characteristics.

The Syrian and Mesopotamian Eastern Catholics were commonly called Chaldeans (or Assyro-Chaldeans). The term Chaldean, which in Syriac generally meant magician or astrologer, denoted in Latin and other European languages (Greater) Syrian nationality, and the Syriac or Aramaic language. For Aramaic, the designation "Chaldean" especially refers to the form that is found in certain chapters of Daniel. The broader usage of the term continued until the Latin missionaries at Mosul in the 17th century adopted "Chaldean" to distinguish the Catholics of the East Syriac Rite from those of the West Syriac Rite, which they called "Syrians". It was also used to distinguish from the Assyrian Church of the East, some of whom called themselves Suraye or even only "Christians", not with repudiating the theological name "Nestorian". Modern members of the Assyrian Church of the East and the Ancient Church of the East distinguish themselves from the rest of Christendom as the "Church of the East" or "Easterns" as opposed to "Westerns" by which they denote Greek Orthodox, Syriac Orthodox or Latin Catholics.

In recent times they have been called, chiefly by the Anglicans, the "Assyrian Church", a name which can be defended on archaeological grounds. Brightman, in his "Liturgies Eastern and Western", includes Chaldean and Malabar Catholics and Assyrians under "Persian Rite".

The catalogue of liturgies in the British Museum has adopted the usual Roman Catholic nomenclature:

- Chaldean Rite : that of the Chaldean Catholic Church and the Assyrian Church of the East
- Malabar Rite (southern India) : Syro-Malabar Catholic Church
- Syriac Rite : Syriac Orthodox and Syriac Catholic Church

Most printed liturgies of those rites are Eastern Rite Catholic.

The language of all three forms of the East Syriac Rite is the Eastern dialect of Syriac, a modern form of which is still spoken by the Assyrian Church of the East, the Ancient Church of the East (which broke away from the Assyrian Church of the East in the 1960s due to a dispute involving changes to the liturgical calendar, but is now in the process of reunification), and the Chaldean Catholic Church.

== History ==
Lineages of the East Syriac Rite

The Chaldean rite originally grew out of the liturgy of the Church in Edessa. The tradition, resting on the legend of Abgar and of his correspondence with Christ, which has been shown to be apocryphal — is to the effect that St. Thomas the Apostle, on his way to India, established Christianity in Mesopotamia, Assyria, and Persia, and left Thaddeus of Edessa (or Addai), "one of the Seventy", and Saint Mari in charge there. The liturgy of the Church of the East is attributed to these two, but it is said to have been revised by the Patriarch Yeshuyab III in about 650. Some, however, consider this liturgy to be a development of the Antiochian.

After the First Council of Ephesus (431) - the third Ecumenical Council - the Church of Seleucia-Ctesiphon, which had hitherto been governed by a catholicos, refused to condemn Nestorius. Therefore, as part of the Nestorian Schism, the Church of Seleucia-Ctesiphon cut itself off from Western Christianity. In 498 the Catholicos assumed the title of "Patriarch of the East", and up until the 1400s the Church of the East spread throughout Persia, Tartary, Mongolia, China, and India due to the efforts of Missionaries.

However, at the end of the fourteenth century due to the conquests of Tamerlane and his destruction of Christian settlements across Asia, in addition to other factors such as anti-Christian and Buddhist oppression during the Ming Dynasty, the large Church of the East structure was all but destroyed- reducing it to a few small communities in Persia, their homeland in Mesopotamia, Cyprus, the Malabar Coast of India, and the Island of Socotra. These remaining communities were later whittled away at in other events. The Church of the East in Cyprus united themselves to Rome in 1445, there was a Schism in 1552 between the patriarchates of Eliya line and Shimun line which weakened the Church, and the Christians of Socotra were Islamized in the 16th century. The Church in India was divided and cut off from their hierarchy due to the Portuguese support for Synod of Diamper in 1599. Due to these events, the diaspora of the Church of the East diminished. The Elia line eventually developed into the Chaldean Catholic Church and the Assyrian Church of the East was turned into a small community of around 50,000 people in the Hakkari Mountains under the headship of the Shimun line. A small group of Indians eventually rejoined the Assyrian Church of the East, forming the Chaldean Syrian Church in the 1900s, although the main body of the Malabar Christians remained as the Syro-Malabar Church. A large group under the leadership of Mar Thoma joined the Oriental Orthodox West Syriac rite churches in their own set of schisms. Additionally, the secession of a large number to the Russian Church due to the Russian Ecclesiastical Mission in Urmia, a Kurdish massacre in 1843, and an attempt to form an Independent Catholic Chaldean Church on the model of the Old Catholics all resulted in more Eastern rite Assyrians separating.

== The Eucharistic service ==
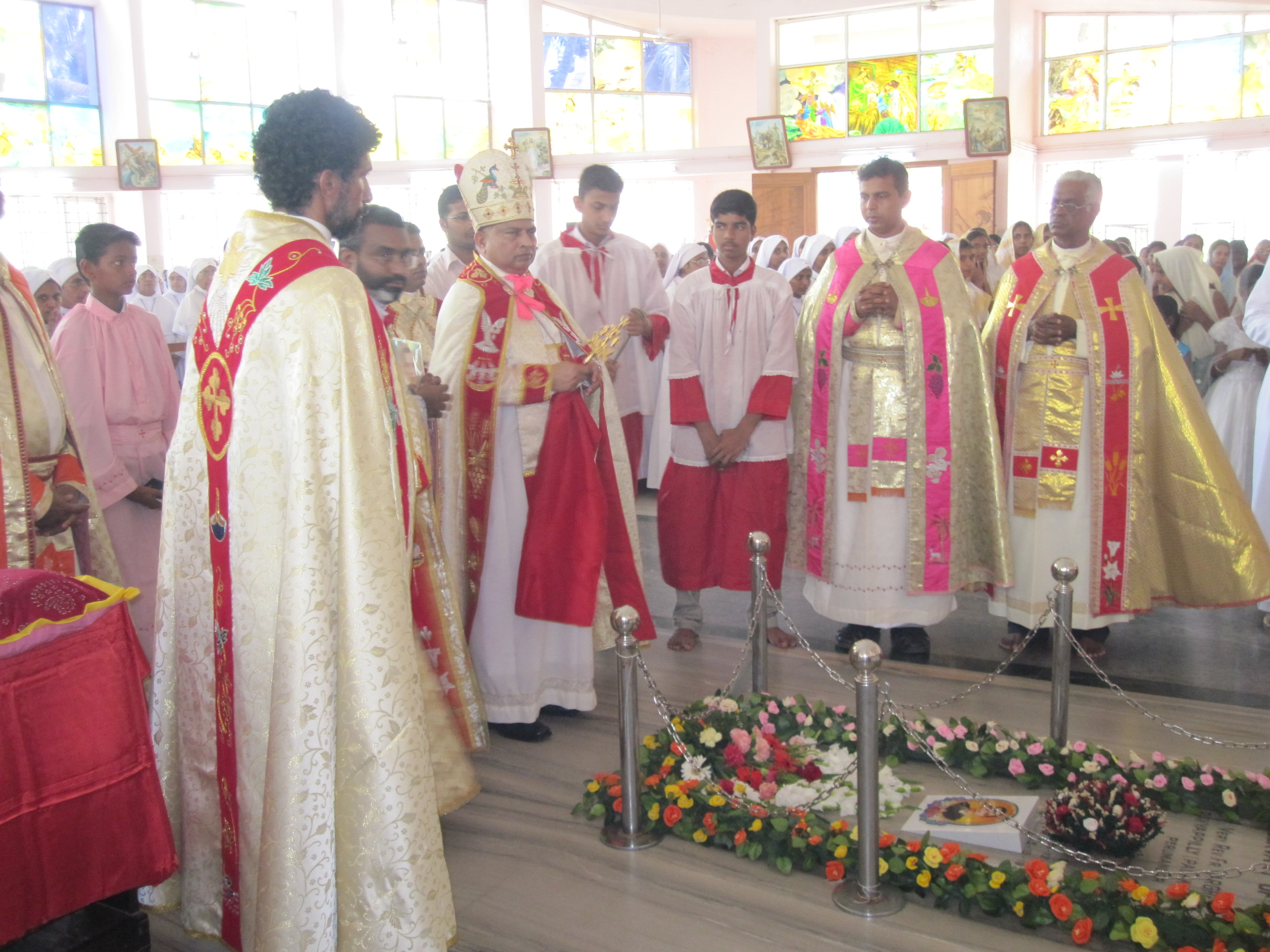
A Syro-Malabar Catholic bishop holding the Mar Thoma Christian Cross, which symbolizes the heritage and identity of the Syrian Church of Saint Thomas Christians of India

There are three Anaphorae; those of the Holy Apostles (Saints Addai and Mari), Mar Nestorius, and Mar Theodore the Interpreter. The first is the most popularly and extensively used. The second was traditionally used on the Epiphany and the feasts of St. John the Baptist and of the Greek Doctors, both of which occur in Epiphany-tide on the Wednesday of the Rogation of the Ninevites, and on Maundy Thursday. The third is used (except when the second is ordered) from Advent to Palm Sunday. The same pro-anaphoral part serves for all three.

The Eucharistic Liturgy is preceded by a preparation, or "Office of the Prothesis", which includes the solemn kneading and baking of the loaves. These were traditionally leavened, the flour being mixed with a little oil and the holy leaven (malka), which, according to tradition, "was given and handed down to us by our holy fathers Mar Addai and Mar Mari and Mar Toma", and of which and of the holy oil a very strange story is told. The real leavening, however, is done by means of fermented dough (khmira) from the preparation of the last Eucharistic Liturgy. The Chaldean and Syro-Malabar Catholics now use unleavened bread.

The Liturgy itself is introduced by the first verse of the Gloria in Excelsis and the Lord's prayer, with "farcings" (giyura), consisting of a form of the Sanctus. Then follow:

- The Introit Psalm (variable), called Marmitha, with a preliminary prayer, varying for Sundays and greater feasts and for "Memorials" and ferias. In the Malabar Rite, Pss. xiv, cl, and cxvi are said in alternate verses by priests and deacons.
- The "Antiphon of the Sanctuary" (Unitha d' qanki), variable, with a similarly varying prayer.
- The Lakhumara, an antiphon beginning "To Thee, Lord", which occurs in other services also preceded by a similarly varying prayer.
- The Trisagion. Incense is used before this. In the Eastern Rite at low Mass the elements are put on the altar before the incensing.

There are four or five Lections: (a) the Law and (b) the Prophecy, from the Old Testament, (c) the Lection from the Acts, (d) the Epistle, always from St. Paul, (e) the Gospel. Some days have all five lections, some four, some only three. All have an Epistle and a Gospel, but, generally, when there is a Lection from Law there is none from the Acts, and vice versa. Sometimes there is none from either Law or Acts. The first three are called Qiryani (Lections), the third Shlikha (Apostle). Before the Epistle and Gospel, hymns called Turgama (interpretation) are, or should be, said; that before the Epistle is invariable, that of the Gospel varies with the day. They answer to the Greek prokeimena. The Turgama of the Epistle is preceded by proper psalm verses called Shuraya (beginning), and that of the Gospel by other proper psalm verses called Zumara (song). The latter includes Alleluia between the verses.

The Deacon's Litany, or Eklene, called Karazutha (proclamation), resembles the "Great Synapte" of the Greeks. During it the proper "Antiphon [Unitha] of the Gospel" is sung by the people.

=== The Offertory ===
The deacons proclaim the expulsion of the unbaptized, and set the "hearers" to watch the doors. The priest places the bread and wine on the altar, with words (in the Church of the East, but not in the Chaldean Catholic Rite) which seem as if they were already consecrated. He sets aside a "memorial of the Virgin Mary, Mother of Christ" (Chaldean; usual Malabar Rite, "Mother of God"; but according to Raulin's Latin of the Malabar Rite, "Mother of God Himself and of the Lord Jesus Christ"), and of the patron of the Church (in the Malabar Rite, "of St.Thomas"). Then follows the proper "Antiphon of the Mysteries" (Unitha d' razi), answering to the offertory.

=== The Creed ===
This is a variant of the Nicene Creed. It is possible that the order or words "and was incarnate by the Holy Ghost and was made man, and was conceived and born of the Virgin Mary", may enshrine a Nestorian idea, but the Chaldean Catholics do not seem to have noticed it, their only alteration being the addition of the Filioque. The Malabar Book has an exact translation of Latin. In Neale's translation of the Malabar Rite the Karazutha, the Offertory, and the Expulsion of the Unbaptized come before the Lections and the Creed follows immediately on the Gospel, but in the Propaganda edition of 1774 the Offertory follows the Creed, which follows the Gospel.

The first Lavabo, followed by a Kushapa ("beseeching", i.e., prayer said in kneeling) and a form of the "Orate fratres", with its response. Then the variations of the three Anaphora begin.

The Kiss of Peace, preceded by a G'hantha, i.e., a prayer said with bowed head.

The prayer of Memorial (Dukhrana) of the Living and the Dead, and the Diptychs; the latter is now obsolete in the Church of the East.

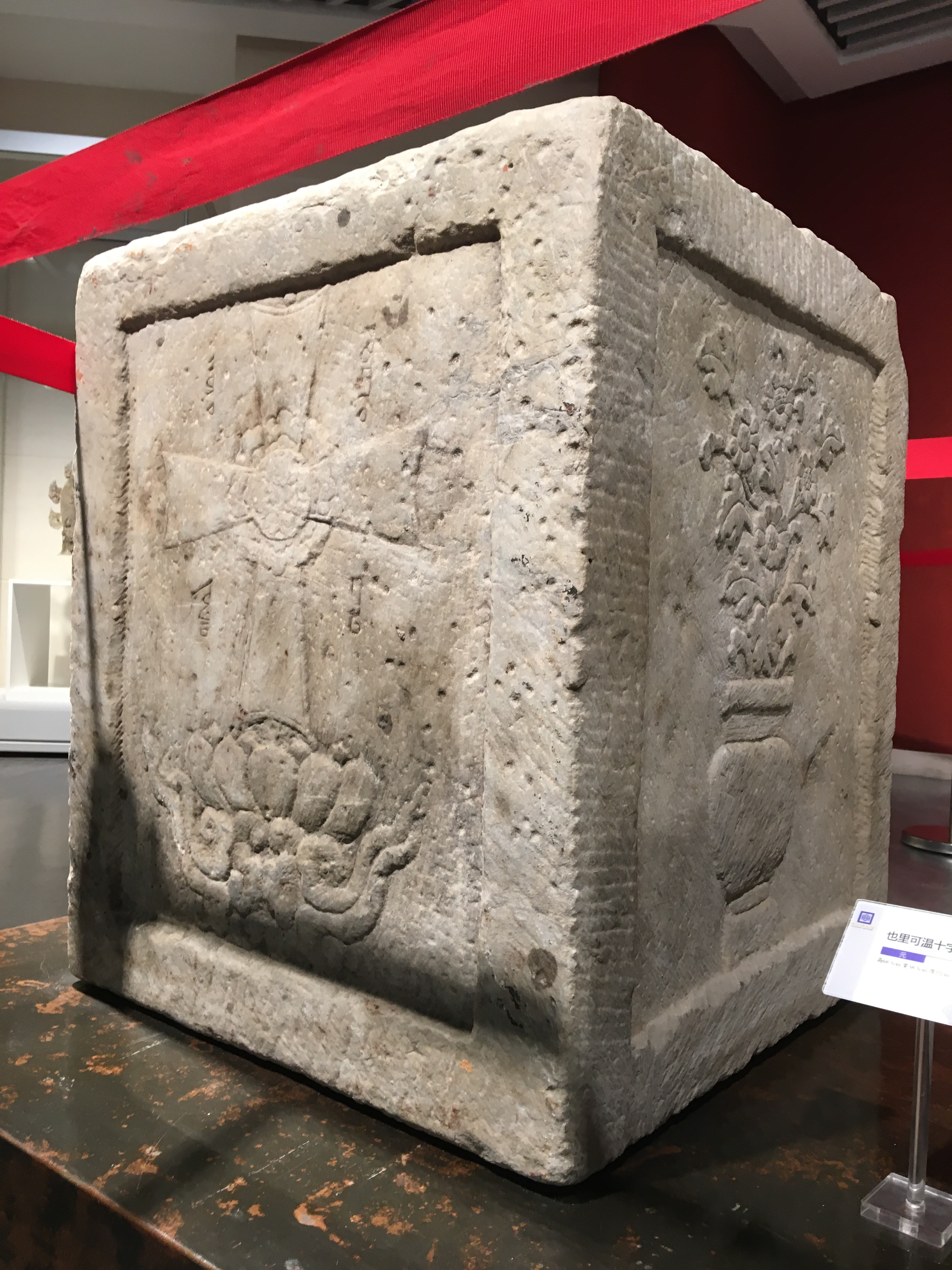
Chinese stone inscription of a Church of the East Christian Cross from a monastery of Fangshan District in Beijing (then called Dadu, or Khanbaliq), dated to the Yuan Dynasty (1271-1368 AD) of medieval China.

=== The Anaphora ===
As in all liturgies this begins with a form of a Sursum corda, but the East Syriac form is more elaborate than any other, especially in the Anaphora of Theodore. Then follows the Preface of the usual type ending with the Sanctus.

The Post-Sanctus (to use the Hispanico-Gallican term) is an amplification—similar in idea and often in phraseology to those in all liturgies except the Roman—of the idea of the Sanctus into a recital of the work of Redemption, extending to some length and ending, in the Anaphorae of Nestorius and Theodore, with the recital of the Institution. In the Anaphora of the Apostles the recital of the Institution is wanting, though it has been supplied in the Anglican edition of the Church of the East book. Hammond (Liturgies Eastern and Western, p. lix) and most other writers hold that the Words of Institution belong to this Liturgy and should be supplied somewhere; Hammond (loc.cit) suggests many arguments for their former presence. The reason of their absence is uncertain. While some hold that this essential passage dropped out in times of ignorance, others say it never was there at all, being unnecessary, since the consecration was held to be effected by the subsequent Epiklesis alone. Another theory, evidently of Western origin and not quite consistent with the general Eastern theory of consecration by an Epiklesis following Christ's words, is that, being the formula of consecration, it was held too sacred to be written down. It does not seem to be quite certain whether Church of the East priests did or did not insert the Words of Institution in old times, but it seems that many of them do not do so now.

The Prayer of the Great Oblation with a second memorial of the Living and the Dead, a Kushapa.

The G'hantha of the Epiklesis, or Invocation of Holy Spirit. The Epiklesis itself is called Nithi Mar (May He come, O Lord) from its opening words. The Liturgy of the Apostles is so vague as to the purpose of the Invocation that, when the words of Institution are not said, it would be difficult to imagine this formula to be sufficient on any hypothesis, Eastern or Western. The Anaphorae of Nestorius and Theodore, besides having the Words of Institution, have definite Invocations, evidently copied from Antiochean or Byzantine forms. The older Chaldean and the Malabar Catholic books have inserted the Words of Institution with an Elevation, after the Epiklesis. But the 1901 Mosul edition puts the Words of Institution first.

Here follow a Prayer for Peace, a second Lavabo and a censing.

=== The Fraction, Consignation, Conjunction, and Commixture ===
The Host is broken in two, and the sign of the Cross is made in the Chalice with one half, after which the other with the half that has been dipped in the chalice. The two halves are then reunited on the Paten. Then a cleft is made in the Host "qua parte intincta est in Sanguine" (Renaudot's tr.), and a particle is put in the chalice, after some intricate arranging on the paten.

=== Communion ===
The veil is thrown open, the deacon exhorts the communicants to draw near, the priests breaks up the Host for distribution. Then follows the Lord's Prayer, with Introduction and Embolism, and the Sancta Sanctis, and then the "Antiphon of the Bema" (Communion) is sung. The Communion is in both species separately, the priest giving the Host and the deacon the Chalice. Then follows a variable antiphon of thanksgiving, a post-communion, and a dismissal. Afterwards the Mkaprana, an unconsecrated portion of the holy loaf, is distributed to the communicants, but not, as in the case of the Greek antidoron, and as the name of the latter implies, to non-communicants. The Chaldean Catholics are communicated with the Host dipped in the Chalice. They reserve what is left of the Holy Gifts, while the Church of the East priests consume all before leaving the church.

Properly, and according to their own canons, the Church of the East ought to say Mass on every Sunday and Friday, on every festival, and daily during the first, middle, and last week of Lent and the octave of Easter. In practice it is only said on Sundays and greater festivals, at the best, and in many churches not so often, a sort of "dry Mass" being used instead. The Chaldean Catholic priests say Mass daily, and where there are many priests there will be many Masses in the same Church in one day, which is contrary to the Church of the East canons. The Anglican editions of the liturgies omit the names of the authors and call the Anaphorae of Nestorius and Theodore the "Second Hallowing" and "Third Hallowing". Otherwise there are no alterations except the addition of Words of Institution to the first Anaphorae. The recent Catholic edition has made the same alterations and substituted "Mother of God" for "Mother of Christ". In each edition the added Words of Institution follow the form of the rite of the edition. The prayers of the Mass, like those of the Orthodox Eastern Church, are generally long and diffuse. Frequently they end with a sort of doxology called Qanuna which is said aloud, the rest being recited in a low tone. The Qanuna in form and usage resembles the Greek ekphonesis.

The vestments used by the priest at Mass are the Sudhra, a girded alb with three crosses in red or black on the shoulder, the Urara (orarion) or stole worn crossed by priests, but not by bishops (as in the West), and the Ma'apra, a sort of linen cope. The deacon wears the sudhra, with a urara over the left shoulder.

== Divine Office ==
Martyrs Prayer - Tuesday Matins
Chaldean Rite hymn attributed to Maruthas of Martyropolis.

The nucleus of this is, as it is usual, the recitation of the Psalter. There are only three regular hours of service (Evening, Midnight, and Morning) with a rarely used compline. In practice only Morning and Evening are commonly used, but these are extremely well attended daily by laity as well as clergy. When the Church of the East had monasteries (which is no longer the case) seven hours of prayer were the custom in them, and three hulali of the Psalter were recited at each. This would mean a daily recitation of the whole Psalter. The present arrangement provides for seven hulali at each ferial night service, ten on Sundays, three on "Memorials", and the whole Psalter on feasts of Our Lord.

At the evening service there is a selection of from four to seven psalms, varying with the day of the week, and also a Shuraya, or short psalm, with generally a portion of Ps. cxviii, varying with the day of the fortnight.

At the morning service the invariable psalms are cix, xc, ciii (1–6), cxii, xcii, cxlviii, cl, cxvi. On ferias and "Memorials" Ps. cxlvi is said after Ps. cxlviii, and on ferias Ps. 1, 1–18, comes at the end of the psalms. The rest of the services consist of prayers, antiphons, litanies, and verses (giyura) inserted, like the Greek stichera, but more extensively, between verses of psalms. On Sundays the Gloria in Excelsis and Benedicte are said instead of Ps. cxlvi.

Both morning and evening services end with several prayers, a blessing, (Khuthama, "Sealing" ), the kiss of peace, and the Creed. The variables, besides the psalms, are those of the feast or day, which are very few, and those of the day of the fortnight. These fortnights consist of weeks called "Before" (Qdham) and "After" (Wathar), according to which of the two choirs begins the service. Hence the book of the Divine Office is called Qdham u wathar, or at full length Kthawa daqdham wadhwathar, the "Book of Before and After".

== Liturgical calendars ==
Amen in East Syriac Aramaic

The year is divided into periods of about seven weeks each, called Shawu'i; these are Advent (called Subara, "Annunciation"), Ephiphany, Lent, Easter, the Apostles, Summer, "Elias and the Cross", "Moses", and the "Dedication" (Qudash idta). "Moses" and the "Dedication" have only four weeks each. The Sundays are generally named after the Shawu'a in which they occur, "Fourth Sunday of Epiphany", "Second Sunday of the Annunciation ", etc., though sometimes the name changes in the middle of a Shawu'a. Most of the "Memorials" (dukhrani), or saints' days, which have special lections, occur on the Fridays between Christmas and Lent, and are therefore movable. Feasts, such as Christmas, Ephiphany, the Assumption, and about thirty smaller days without proper lections are on fixed days. There are four shorter fasting periods besides the Great Fast (Lent); these are:

- the Fast of Mar Zaya, the three days after the second Sunday of the Nativity;
- the Fast of the Virgins, after the first Sunday of the Epiphany;
- the Rogation of the Ninevites, seventy days before Easter;
- the Fast of Mart Mariam (Our Lady), from the first to the fourteenth of August.

The Fast of the Ninevites commemorates the repentance of Nineveh at the preaching of Jonas, and is carefully kept. Those of Mar Zaya and the Virgins are nearly obsolete. As compared with the Latin and Greek Calendars, that of the Chaldeans, whether Catholic or Assyrian, is very meagre. The Malabar Rite has largely adopted the Roman Calendar, and several Roman days have been added to that of the Chaldean Catholics. The Chaldean Easter coincides with that of the Roman Catholic Church.

== Other sacraments and occasional services ==
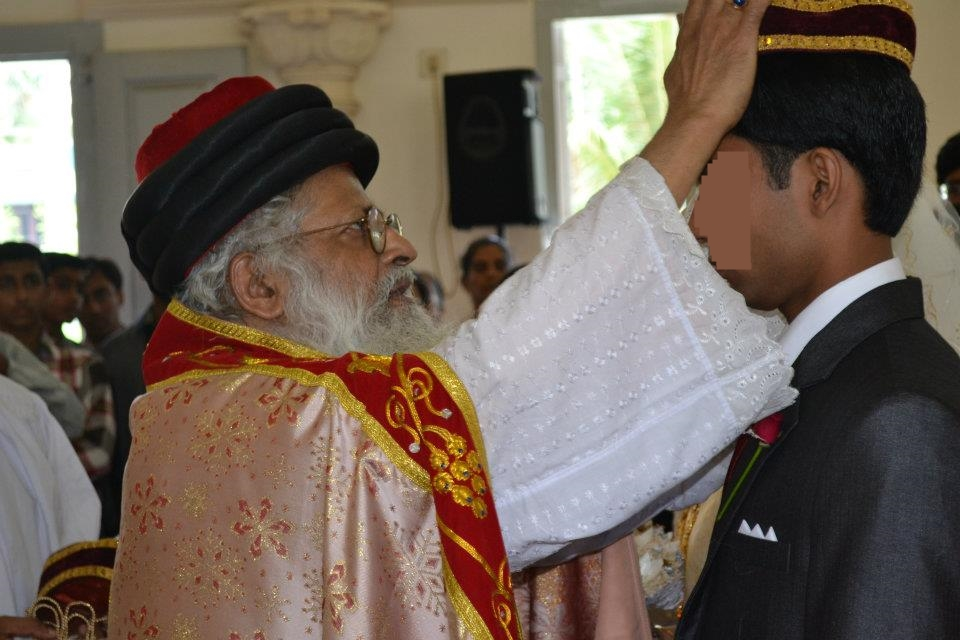
Mystery of Crowning at a wedding in the Chaldean Syrian Church

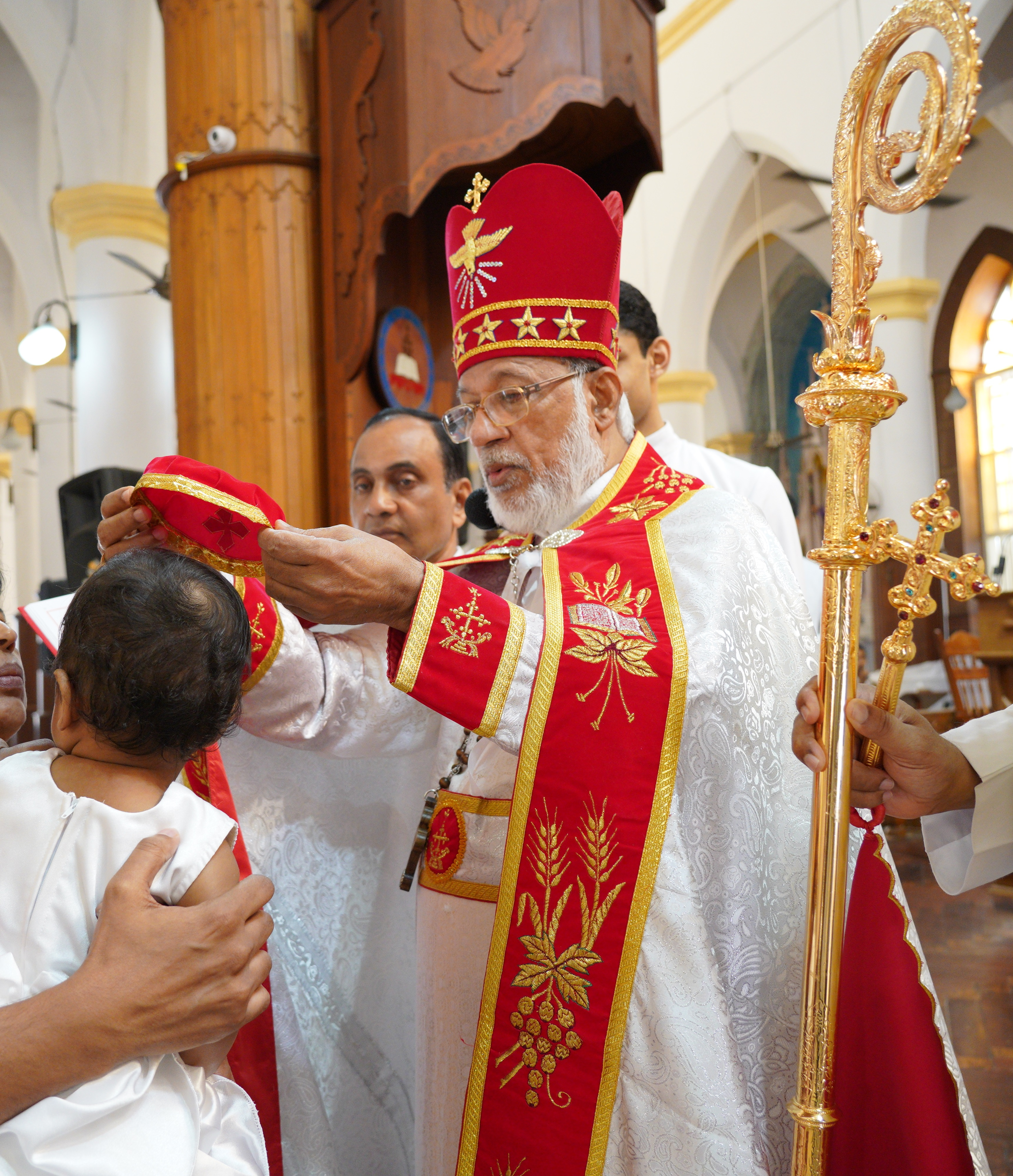
Syro-Malabar Major Archbishop Mar George Alencherry crowning a baby after baptism

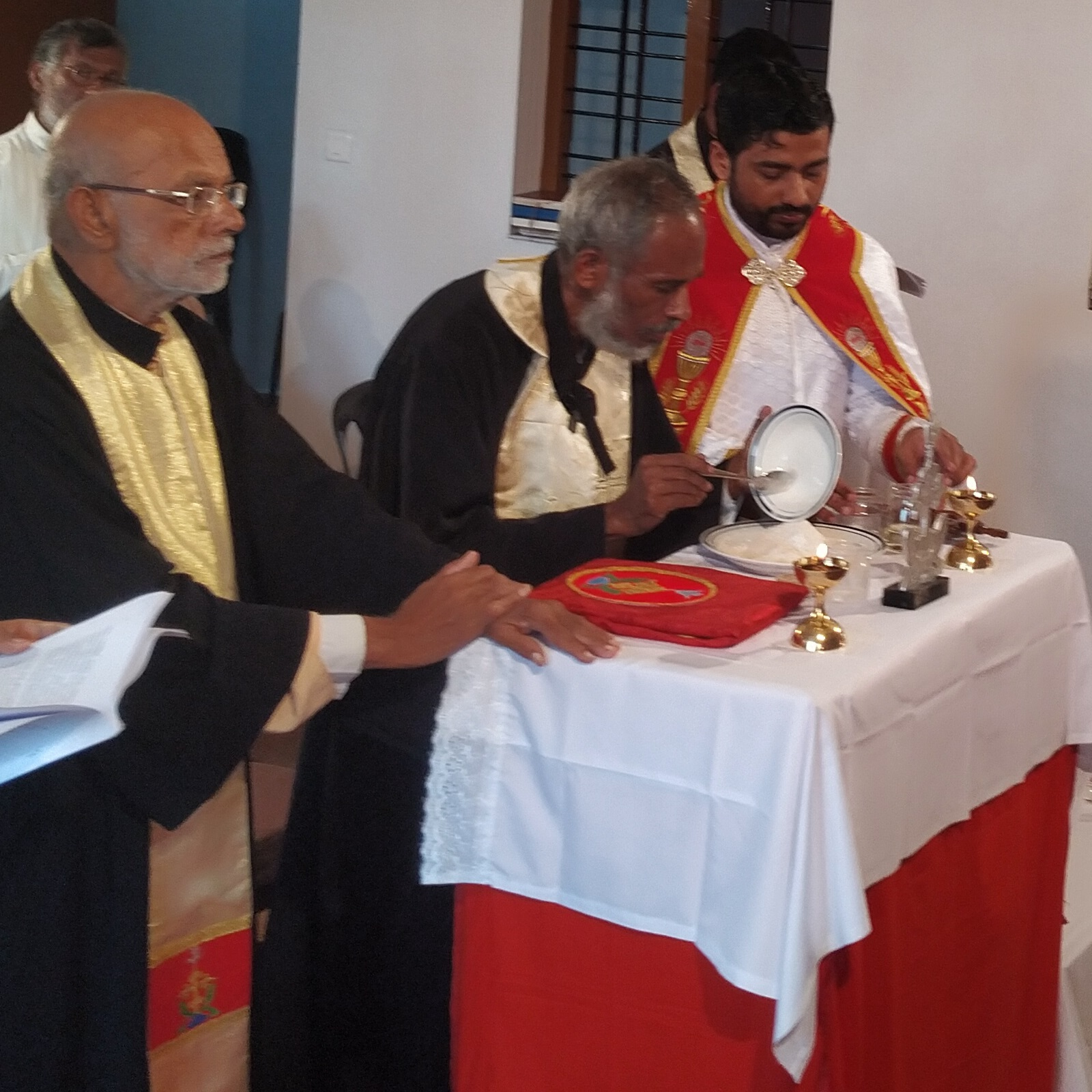
Rite of Renewal of Holy Leaven (Malka) in Syro Malabar Church

The other Sacraments in use in the Church of the East are Baptism, with which is always associated an anointing, which as in other eastern rites answers to Confirmation, Holy Order and Matrimony, but not Penance or Unction of the sick. The Chaldean Catholics now have a form not unlike the Byzantine and West Syriac. The nearest approach to Penance among the Nestorians is a form, counted as a sacrament, for the reconciliation of apostates and excommunicated persons, prayers from which are occasionally used in cases of other penitents. Assemani's arguments (ibid., cclxxxvi–viii) for a belief in Penance as a Sacrament among the ancient Nestorians or for the practice of auricular confession among the Malabar Nestorians are not conclusive. The Chaldeans have a similar form to that of the Roman Rite. The Assyrian Church of the East omits Matrimony from the list, and make up the number of the mysteries to seven by including the Holy Leaven and the Sign of the Cross, but they are now rather vague about the definition or numeration.

The only other rite of any interest is the consecration of churches. Oil, but not chrism, plays a considerable part in these rites, being used in Baptism, possibly in Confirmation, in the reconciliation of apostates, etc., in the consecration of churches, and the making of bread for the Eucharist. It is not used in ordination or for the sick. There are two sorts of oil; the one is ordinary olive oil, blessed or not blessed for the occasion, the other is the oil of the Holy Horn. The last, which, though really only plain oil, represents the chrism (or myron) of other rites, is believed to have been handed down from the Apostles with the Holy Leaven. The legend is that the Baptist caught the water which fell from the body of Christ at His baptism and preserved it. He gave it to St. John the Evangelist, who added to it some of the water which fell from the pierced side. At the Last Supper Jesus gave two loaves to St. John, bidding him keep one for the Holy Leaven. With this St. John mingled some of the Blood from the side of Christ. After Pentecost the Apostles mixed oil with the sacred water, and each took a horn of it, and the loaf they ground to pieces and mixed it with flour and salt to be the Holy Leaven. The Holy Horn is constantly renewed by the addition of oil blessed by a bishop on Maundy Thursday.

The baptismal service is modeled on the Eucharistic. The Mass of the Catechumens is almost identical, with of course appropriate Collects, psalms, Litanies, and Lections. After the introductory Gloria, Lord's Prayer, Marmitha (in this case Psalm 88) and its Collect, follow the imposition of hands and the signing with oil, after which follow an Antiphon of the Sanctuary and Ps. xliv, cix, cxxxi, with giyuri, Litanies, and Collects, then the lakhumara, Trisagion, and Lections (Epistle and Gospel ), and the Karazutha, after which the priest says the prayer of the imposition of hands, and the unbaptized are dismissed. An antiphon answering to that "of the mysteries" follows, and then the Creed is said. The bringing forward of the Holy Horn and the blessing of the oil take the place of the Offertory. The Anaphora is paralleled by Sursum corda, Preface, and Sanctus, a Nithi Mar, or Epiklesis, upon the oil, a commixture of the new oil with that of the Holy Horn, and the Lord's Prayer. Then the font is blessed and signed with the holy oil, and in the place of the Communion comes the Baptism itself. The children are signed with the oil on the breast and then anointed all over, and are dipped thrice in the font. The formula is: "N., be thou baptized in the name of the Father, in the name of the Son, in the name of the Holy Ghost. Amen." Then follows the post-baptismal thanksgiving. Confirmation follows immediately. There are two prayers of Confirmation and a signing between the eyes with the formula: "N., is baptized and perfected in the name, etc." It is not quite clear whether oil should be used with this signing or not. Then any oil that remains over is poured into the Holy Horn, held over the font, and the water in the font is loosed from its former consecration with rather curious ceremonies. The Chaldean Catholics have added the renunciations, profession of faith, and answers of the sponsors from the Roman Ritual, and anoint with chrism.

The marriage service (Burakha, 'Blessing") is very similar to that of the Byzantine Rite, and to some extent the Jewish rite. The Mystery of Crowning, while not viewed as a sacrament in much of East Syriac Christianity, features several rituals, including the crowning of the couple and, within the Assyrian Church of the East, the consumption of hanānā–a mixture made with the dust of a martyr's tomb–by the betrothed.

The orders of the Church of the East are those of reader (Qaruya), subdeacon (Hiupathiaqna), deacon (Mshamshana), presbyter (Qashisha), archdeacon (Arkidhyaquna) and bishop (Apisqupa). The degree of archdeacon, though has an ordination service of its own, is only counted as a degree of the presbyterate, and is by some held to be the same as that of chorepiscopus (Kurapisqupa), which never involved episcopal ordination in the Church of the East. When a priest is engaged in sacerdotal functions, he is called Kahna (i.e., lereus; sacerdos) and a bishop is similarly Rab kahni (Chief of the Priests, archiereus, pontifex). Quashisha and Apisqupa only denote the degree. Kahnutha, priesthood, is used of the three degrees of deacon, priest, and bishop. The ordination formula is: "N. has been set apart, consecrated, and perfected to the work of the diaconate [or of the presbyterate] to the Levitical and stephanite Office [or for the office of the Aaronic priesthood], in the Name, etc., In the case of a bishop it is : "to the great work of the episcopate of the city of ..." A similar formula is used for archdeacons and metropolitans.

The Consecration of churches (Siamidha or Qudash Madhbkha) consists largely of unctions. The altar is anointed all over, and there are four consecration crosses on the four interior walls of the sanctuary, and these and the lintel of the door and various other places are anointed. The oil is not that of the Holy Horn, but fresh olive oil consecrated by the bishop.

== Manuscripts and editions ==
Few of the manuscripts, except some lectionaries in the British Museum, were written before the 15th century, and most, whether Chaldean or Nestorian, are of the 17th and 18th. The books in use are:

- Ṭakhsā, a priest's book, containing the Eucharistic service (Qūrbānā or Qūdāšā) in its three forms, with the administration of other sacraments, and various occasional prayers and blessings. It is nearly the Euchologion of the Greeks (see Rite of Constantinople).
- Kṯāḇdā da-qḏam waḏ-wāṯar, "Book of the Before and After", contains the Ordinary of the Divine Office except the Psalter, arranged for two weeks.
- Mazmorē d-Dāwīḏ (David), the Psalter, divided into Hūlālē, which answer more or less to the kathismata of the Greeks. It includes the collects of the Hūlālē.
- Qiryānā, Šlīḥā w-Īwangālīyo, lections, epistles, and gospels, sometimes together, sometimes in separate books.
- Tūrgāmā, explanatory hymns sung before the Epistle and Gospel.
- Ḥūḏrā, containing the variables for Sundays, Lent and the Rogation of the Ninevites, and other holy days.
- Kaškūl, a selection from the Ḥūḏrā for weekdays.
- Gazzā, containing variables for festivals except Sundays.
- Abukhalima, a collectary, so called from its compiler, Elias III, Abu Khalim ibn alKhaditha, Metropolitan of Nisibis, and patriarch (1175–99).
- Bā'ūtha d-Nīnwāyē, rhythmical prayers attributed to Saint Ephraem, used during the Fast of the Ninevites.
- Takhsa d'amadha, the office of baptism.
- Burakha, the marriage service.
- Kathnita, the burial service for priests.
- Anidha, the burial service for lay people.
- Takhsa d'siamidha, the ordination services.
- Takhsa d'husaya, the "Office of Pardon", or reconciliation of penitents.

These last six are excerpts from the Takhsa.

Of the above the following have been printed in Syriac: For the Church of the East:

- The Takhsa, in two parts, by Archbishop of Canterbury's Assyrian Mission (Urmi, 1890–92) The Society for Promoting Christian Knowledge has published an English translation of the first part of the Takhsa, both parts "unmodified except by the omission of the heretical names" (Brightman);
- Dhaqdham wadhwathar, by the same (Urmi, 1894); Dawidha, by the same (Urmi, 1891).
- Khudra, in three volumes, by Mar Narsai Press (Trichur, 1960; reprint 1993).

For the Chaldean Catholics:

- Missale Chaldaicum, containing the Liturgy of the Apostles in Syriac and Epistles and Gospels in Syriac with an Arabic translation, in Garshuni (Propaganda Press fol., Rome, 1767). A new and revised edition, containing the three liturgies and the lections, epistles, and gospels was published by the Dominicans at Mosul in 1901. The Order of the Church Services of Common Days, etc., from Kthawa dhaqdham wadhwathar (octavo, Mosul, 1866).
- "Breviarium Chaldaicum in usum Nationis Chaldaicae a Josepho Guriel secundo editum" (16mo, Propaganda Press, Rome, 1865).
- "Breviarium Chaldaicum", etc., [8vo, Paris (printed at Leipzig, 1886]. Translation of ca. 70% in English available at: www.syriac-treasury.work

For the Syro-Malabar Catholics:

- "Ordo Chaldaicus Missae Beatorum Apostolorum, juxta ritum Ecclesiae Malabaricae" (fol., Propaganda Press, Rome, 1774).
- "Ordo Chaldaicus Rituum et Lectionum", etc., (fol., Rome, 1775).
- "Ordo Chaldaicus ministerii Sacramentorum Sanctorum", etc., (fol., Rome, 1775).

These three, which together form a Takhsa and Lectionary, are commonly found bound together. The Propaganda reprinted the third part in 1845.

- "Ordo Baptismi adultorum juxta ritum Ecclesiae Malabaricae Chaldaeorum" (octavo, Propaganda Press, Rome, 1859), a Syriac translation of the Roman Order.

The Malabar Rite was revised in a Roman direction by Aleixo de Menezes, Archbishop of Goa, and the revision was authorized by the controversial Synod of Diamper in 1599. So effectively was the original Malabar Rite abolished by the Synod in favour of this revision, and by the schismatics (when in 1649, being cut off from their own patriarch by the Spaniards and Portuguese, they put themselves under the Syriac Orthodox patriarch of Antioch) in favour of the West Syriac Liturgy, that no copy is known to exist, but it is evident from the revised form that it could not have differed materially from the existing East Syriac Rite.

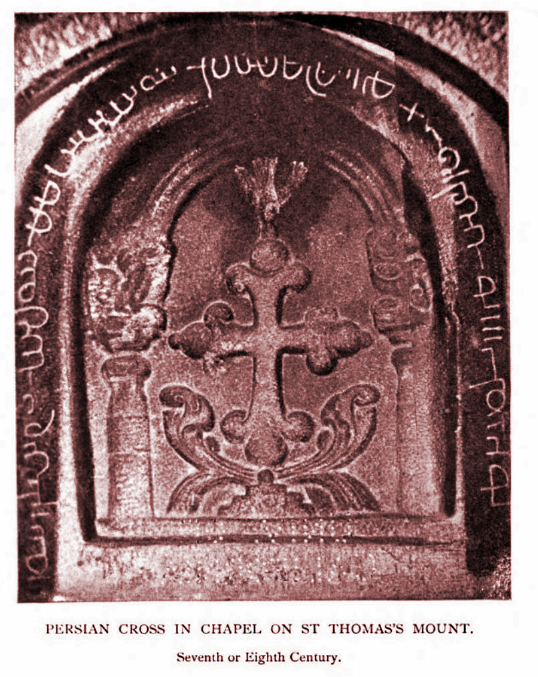
Persian cross at St Thomas Mount, Chennai, Tamil Nadu, India

== See also ==
- Syriac Christianity
- West Syriac Rite

== Sources ==
- Brock, Sebastian P. (1992). Studies in Syriac Christianity: History, Literature, and Theology. Aldershot: Variorum. ISBN 9780860783053.
- Brock, Sebastian P. (1996). Syriac Studies: A Classified Bibliography, 1960-1990. Kaslik: Parole de l'Orient.
- Brock, Sebastian P. (1997). A Brief Outline of Syriac Literature. Kottayam: St. Ephrem Ecumenical Research Institute. ISBN 978-1-61143-563-4.
- Brock, Sebastian P. (2006). Fire from Heaven: Studies in Syriac Theology and Liturgy. Aldershot: Ashgate. ISBN 9780754659082.
- Chabot, Jean-Baptiste (1902). Synodicon orientale ou recueil de synodes nestoriens (PDF). Paris: Imprimerie Nationale.
- Fahlbusch, Erwin; Bromiley, Geoffrey William; Lochman, Jan Milic; Mbiti, John; Pelikan, Jaroslav (2008). The Encyclodedia of Christianity. Vol. 5. Wm. B. Eerdmans. ISBN 978-0-8028-2417-2.
- Medlycott, Adolphus E. (1905). India and the Apostle Thomas: An Inquiry, with a Critical Analysis of the Acta Thomae. London: David Nutt.
- Meyendorff, John (1989). Imperial unity and Christian divisions: The Church 450–680 A.D. The Church in history. Vol. 2. Crestwood, NY: St. Vladimir's Seminary Press. ISBN 9780881410563.
- Puthiakunnel, Thomas (1973). "Jewish colonies of India paved the way for St. Thomas". In Menachery, George (ed.). The St. Thomas Christian Encyclopaedia of India. Vol. 2. Trichur. OCLC 1237836.
- Seleznyov, Nikolai N. (2010). "Nestorius of Constantinople: Condemnation, Suppression, Veneration: With special reference to the role of his name in East-Syriac Christianity". Journal of Eastern Christian Studies. 62 (3–4): 165–190.
- Slapak, Orpa, ed. (1995). The Jews of India: A Story of Three Communities. Muzeon Yisrael. ISBN 978-965-278-179-6 – via University Press of New England.
