= Crowning =

Crowning may refer to:

- Crowning, the second stage of childbirth
- Coronation
- Mystery of Crowning, a marriage rite and sacrament in Eastern Christianity
- During a wildfire, crown fires may spontaneously ignite in a process called crowning
