= Bowing in the Byzantine liturgy =

Different kinds of bows used in an Eastern Orthodox worship service

There are several different kinds of bows one could encounter in Byzantine Christian services. The First Council of Nicaea's decree "that prayer be made to God standing" from Pascha (Easter) through Pentecost, and on all Sundays throughout the year, in honour of the Resurrection is observed. The exception is prostrating before the Cross on the Third Sunday of Great Lent and on the Feast of the Exaltation of the Cross, if it falls on a Sunday, as well as for a few sacramental services, e.g., ordinations.

== See also ==
- ru:Земной поклон
- Great bows
- Prostration
- Metanoia (theology)
- Dogeza
- Genuflection
- Kowtow
- Podruchnik
- Ruku
- Sign of the cross
- Sujud
