= Catholic liturgy (disambiguation) =

Catholic liturgy can refer to the various Christian liturgies of the Catholic Church. It may also refer to various particular liturgies and liturgical rites:

== Liturgies ==
- Mass (liturgy), a form of Eucharistic liturgical practice
  - Mass in the Catholic Church
  - Tridentine Mass, a traditional form of the Catholic Mass
- Divine Liturgy, a form of Eucharistic liturgical practice, particularly among Eastern Catholics
- Liturgy of the Hours, Catholic forms of celebrating the canonical hours

== Liturgical families ==
- Catholic particular churches and liturgical rites, describing sui iuris Catholic churches and their liturgical groupings
- Latin liturgical rites, the liturgical practices of the Latin Church
  - Roman Rite, the predominant form of Catholic liturgy
- Eastern Catholic liturgy, describing the history and variety of liturgical practices in the Eastern Catholic Churches

== Other ==
- Sacraments of the Catholic Church, the major rites of the Catholic Church typically accompanied by a liturgical celebration
