= Hanānā =

Sacred dust used in Christian ritual

Hanānā or khnana (Classical Syriac: ܚܢܢܐ, lit. 'pity' or 'compassion'; Latin: pulvis, ex exuviis) is dust collected from the burial site of a Christian saint or martyr for veneration or consumption. In the East Syriac Rite liturgies of Nestorian Christianity and successor denominations such as the Assyrian Church of the East, hanānā is used in both the anointing of the sick and Mystery of Crowning. Among Assyrian, Ethiopian, and early Latin Christians, the dust of holy persons was associated with healing powers.

== East Syriac use ==
In East Syriac Rite Christian practice descending from Nestorian Christianity, hanānā is made by collecting dust from the tomb of a martyr, mixing it with water, oil, and the dust of the tomb of Thomas the Apostle. The hanānā would be applied to sick persons in an act referred to as the "mercy of St. Thomas". The hanānā is mixed with water and wine and drunk by a new couple before the Mystery of Crowning as both a blessing of forgiveness as a signifier of the couple becoming one body in a kind of union (shawtaputa) or communion akin to the Eucharist. Marco Polo and Giovanni de' Marignolli observed and documented the practice of using dust from Thomas's tomb during their travels. The practice has been compared to a documented Buddhist practice of curing headaches with dust from the gravesite of Mahākāśyapa.

== Elsewhere ==
Gregory of Tours, a 6th-century Bishop of Tours, would describe several bishops that died as martyrs in his Glory of the Martyrs and describe the pulvis ('dust') from their graves as granting healing to faithful who collected it. Gregory also declared that the dust of the Basilica of St. Martin was capable of healing. Ethiopian Orthodox faithful would mirror Nestorian practice, replacing dust associated with Thomas with that from a local saint, Tekle Haymanot.

Within the Catholic Church, classification of relics delineate several types of dust associated with saints. Among these are ex exuviis and de pulvere corporis, both the ash or dust left over from a body's decomposition, and ex ligneo pulvere, mixto pulveri corporis, quem residuum continebat prima capsa funeralis, dust from the first coffin which had been impregnated with the products of decomposition.

== See also ==
- Aër
- Holy Qurbono
- Insufflation
- Veneration of the dead
- Sthathicon
