= Byzantine Rite =

Eastern Christian liturgical rite

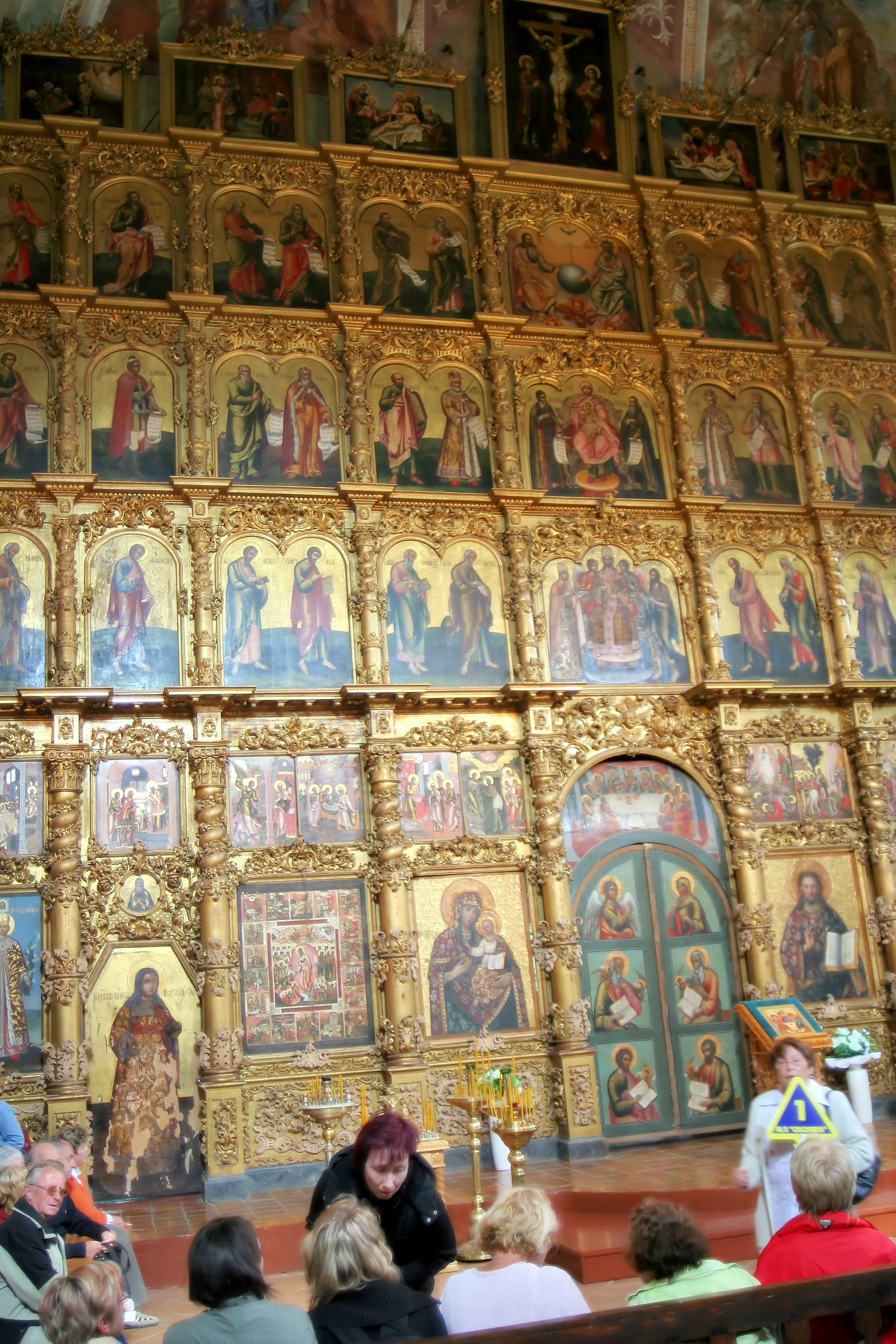
An iconostasis separates the sanctuary from the nave in Byzantine Rite churches. Shown here is part of a six-row iconostasis at Uglich Cathedral. North Deacon's Door (left) and Holy Doors (right).

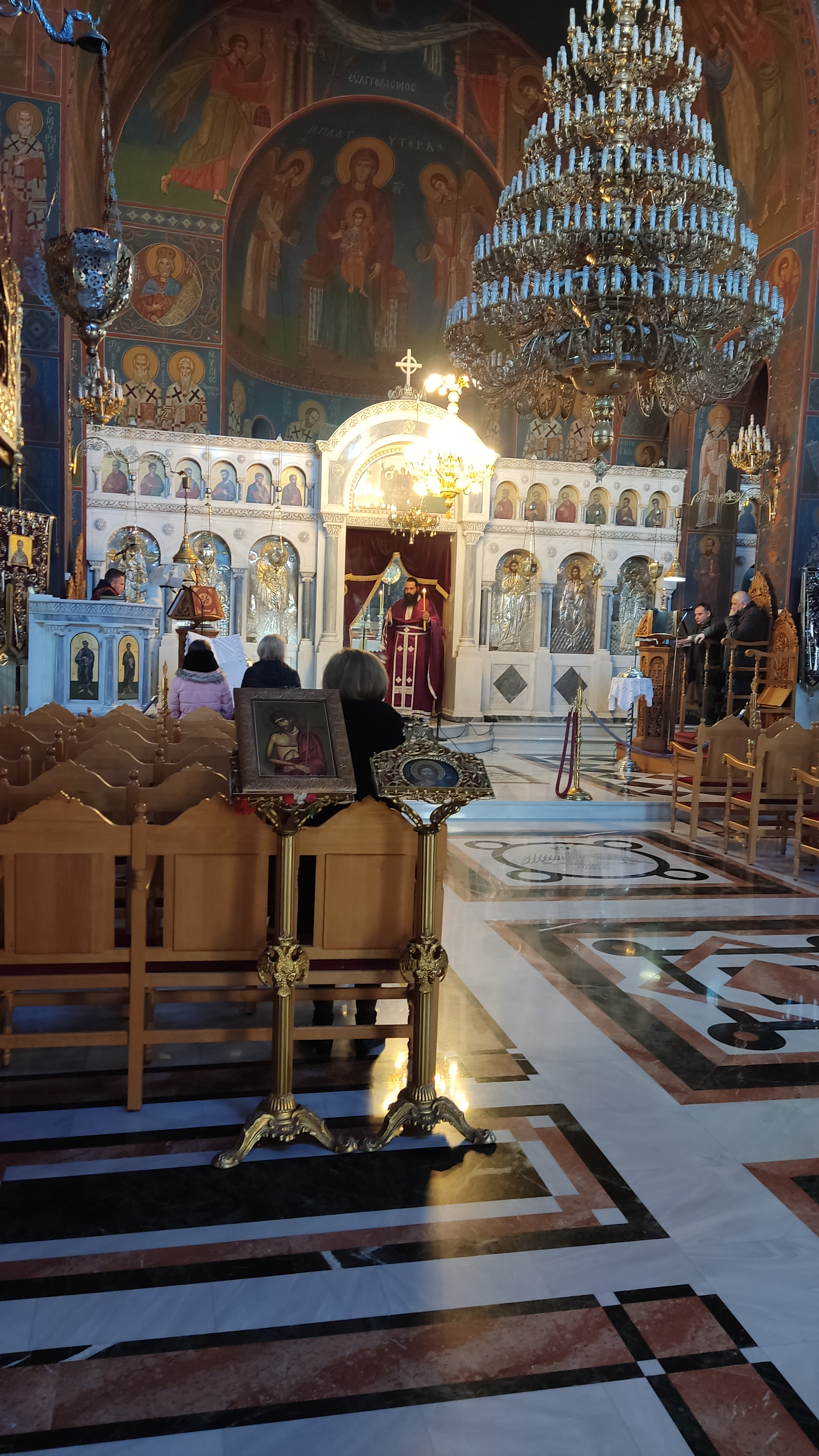
An Orthodox priest in Argos, Greece, conducts a morning liturgy. Liturgical book readers can be seen.

The Byzantine Rite, also known as the Rite of Constantinople, is a liturgical rite that is identified with the wide range of cultural, devotional, and canonical practices that developed in the Eastern Christian church of Constantinople.

The canonical hours are extended and complex, lasting about eight hours (longer during Great Lent) but are abridged outside of large monasteries. An iconostasis, a partition covered with icons, separates the area around the altar from the nave. The sign of the cross, accompanied by bowing, is made very frequently, e.g., more than a hundred times during the divine liturgy, and there is prominent veneration of icons, a general acceptance of the congregants freely moving within the church and interacting with each other, and distinctive traditions of liturgical chanting.

Some traditional practices are falling out of use in modern times in sundry churches and in the diaspora, e.g., the faithful standing during services, bowing and prostrating frequently, and priests, deacons, and monastics always wearing a cassock and other clerical garb even in everyday life (monastics also sleep wearing a cassock) and not shaving or trimming their hair or beards.

In addition to numerous psalms read every day, the entire psalter is read each week, and twice each week during Great Lent, and there are daily readings of other scriptures; also many hymns have quotes from, and references to, the scriptures woven into them. On the numerous fast days there is prescribed abstention from meat and dairy products, and on many fast days also from fish, wine, and the use of oil in cooking. Four fasting seasons are prescribed: Great Lent, Nativity Fast, Apostles' Fast and Dormition Fast. In addition, throughout the year most Wednesdays and Fridays, as well as Mondays in monasteries, are fast days.

== History ==
In its present form, the rite is the product of a long cultural synthesis that developed in the years after the 8th-9th century Iconoclasm, in which monasteries and their cultural contacts with the Holy Land played a decisive role. From the 9th to the 14th centuries, the influence of the Palestinian Rite (Note: Referring to the Greek Orthodox Church of Jerusalem, rather than the Coptic or Antiochene Churches, which were Miaphysite.) exerted a dominating influence and the rite has been called a "hybrid" between an earlier ceremonial rite which scholars have dubbed the cathedral rite of Constantinople, called the asmatiki akolouthia ("sung services") and the Palestinian Rite of Jerusalem, the Hagiopolitan (Gr. "of the Holy City") in Greek, chiefly through the monastic typikon of the Mar Saba monastery near Jerusalem. Later developments were usually connected to monasteries at Constantinople and Mount Athos patronized by the imperial court, such as Studion, whose Rule formed the nucleus of early monastic communities in Bulgaria and Kievan Rus'. In the early modern period, the traditions of the rite received further elaboration from the interface of Christian and Islamic mystical traditions fostered in the Ottoman court.

By the mid-17th century, the practices of the Russian Church differed to those of other Orthodox Christians, who followed contemporary Greek practices. Patriarch Nikon made efforts to correct the translations of texts and institute liturgical reforms so that they were aligned with Greek practices. Nikon's reforms were not accepted by all, and the resulting schism (Raskol) split Russian Christianity into the present Russian Orthodox Church and the historically persecuted Old Believers, who maintained many archaic practices of worship.

== Sacred Mysteries ==
The "Holy Mysteries", or "Sacred Mysteries", or similar, refer to the elements of Holy Communion, the real presence of Christ in the Eucharist, in the texts of the Divine Liturgy, the prayers before and after communion, and elsewhere, as, for example, in the first petition of the ectenia after communion, "Arise! Having partaken of the divine, holy, pure, immortal, heavenly, life-creating, and awesome Mysteries of Christ, let us worthily give thanks to the Lord."

Also termed the sacred mysteries is a broad theological category including the seven sacraments defined in the Western Church but differing slightly in emphasis—stressing their ineffable character and forgoing the intense theological definitions which emerged in the centuries following the Reformation. Although all modern Orthodox churches customarily observe the same seven sacraments as in Catholicism, the number has no dogmatic significance and, up to the 17th century, individual authors varied greatly in the number of rites considered "mysteries". Despite the historical differences, modern Orthodox and Catholic faithful are generally united in viewing the West's seven sacraments and Orthodoxy's looser number of sacred mysteries—seven only by convention—as effectively equivalent. The Catholics regard the two as identical.

Divine Liturgy

The divine liturgy may be celebrated on most days, the exceptions, known as aliturgical days, being in or near Great Lent. Typically, however, the liturgy is celebrated daily only in cathedrals and larger monasteries but elsewhere only on Sundays, major feast days, and some other days, especially during Great Lent.

These three forms of the eucharistic service are in use universal usage:

- The Liturgy of St. John Chrysostom is the one most commonly celebrated throughout the year.
- The Liturgy of St. Basil is celebrated ten times a year.
- The Liturgy of the Presanctified Gifts is celebrated on certain weekdays of Great Lent and of Holy Week.

== Daily office ==
The daily cycle begins with vespers and proceeds throughout the night and day according to the following table: (Note: In accordance with Old Testament or Jewish practice, the day is considered to begin in the evening (Genesis 1:5).)

Name of service in Greek	Name of service in English	Historical time of service	Theme
Hesperinós (Ἑσπερινός)	Vespers	At sunset	Glorification of God, the Creator of the world and its Providence.
Apódeipnon (Ἀπόδειπνον)	Compline	At bedtime	Sleep as the image of death, illumined by Christ's Harrowing of Hell after His death.
Mesonyktikón (Μεσονυκτικόν)	Midnight Office	At midnight	Christ's midnight prayer in Gethsemane; a reminder to be ready for the Bridegroom coming at midnight and the Last Judgment.
Órthros (Ὄρθρος)	Matins or Orthros	Morning watches, ending at dawn	The Lord having given us not only daylight but spiritual light, Christ the Savior.
Prō̂tē Hóra (Πρῶτη Ὥρα)	First Hour (Prime)	At ≈7 AM	Christ's being brought before Pilate.
Trítē Hóra (Τρίτη Ὥρα)	Third Hour (Terce)	At ≈9 AM	Pilate's judgement of Christ and the descent of the Holy Spirit at Pentecost, which occurred during this hour.
Héktē Hóra (Ἕκτη Ὥρα)	Sixth Hour (Sext)	At ≈12 PM	Christ's crucifixion, which occurred during this hour.
Ennátē Hóra (Ἐννάτη Ὥρα)	Ninth Hour (None)	At ≈3 PM	Christ's death, which occurred during this hour.
Typicá (τυπικά) or Pro-Liturgy	Typica	follows the sixth or ninth hour.	

The typica is used whenever the divine liturgy is not celebrated at its usual time, i.e., when there is a vesperal liturgy or no liturgy at all. On days when the liturgy may be celebrated at its usual hour, the typica follows the sixth hour (or matins, where the custom is to serve the Liturgy then) and the Epistle and Gospel readings for the day are read therein; (Note: The typica has a certain correspondence to the Missa Sicca of the Medieval West.) otherwise, on

or when the Liturgy is served at vespers, the typica has a much shorter form and is served between the ninth hour and vespers.

Also, there are Inter-Hours for the First, Third, Sixth and Ninth Hours. These are services of a similar structure to, but briefer than, the hours. Their usage varies with local custom, but generally they are used only during the Nativity Fast, Apostles Fast, and Dormition Fast on days when the Lenten alleluia replaces "God is the Lord" at matins, which may be done at the discretion of the ecclesiarch when the Divine Liturgy is not celebrated.

In addition to these public prayers, there are also private prayers prescribed for both monastics and laypersons; in some monasteries, however, these are read in church. These include Morning and Evening Prayers and prayers (and, in Russia, canons) to be prayed in preparation for receiving the Eucharist.

The full cycle of services are usually served only in monasteries, cathedrals, and other Katholika (sobors). In monasteries and parishes of the Russian tradition, the Third and Sixth Hours are read during the Prothesis ( Liturgy of Preparation); otherwise, the Prothesis is served during matins, the final portion of which is omitted, the Liturgy of the Catechumens beginning immediately after the troparion following the Great Doxology.

The Midnight Office is seldom served in parish churches, except at the Paschal Vigil as the essential office, wherein the burial shroud is removed from the tomb and carried to the altar.

=== Aggregates ===
The sundry Canonical Hours are, in practice, grouped together into aggregates so that there are three major times of prayer a day: Evening, Morning and Midday. (Note: This is to conform with Psalm 55:17, "Evening, morning, and noonday will I tell of it and will declare it, and He will hear my voice.")

The most common groupings are as follows:

==== Ordinary days ====
- Evening — Ninth Hour, Vespers, Compline (Note: In monasteries, when there is an evening meal, compline is often separated from vespers and read after the meal; in Greek (απόδειπνον/apodeipnon) and Slavonic (Повечерiе/Povecheriye), the name for Compline literally means, "After-supper.")
- Morning Watches — Midnight Office, (Note: Midnight Office is often omitted in parish churches.) Matins, First Hour
- Morning — Third Hour, Sixth Hour, and the Divine Liturgy or Typica (Note: Though the Liturgy and Typica are not, strictly speaking, a part of the daily cycle of services, their placement is fixed by the Typikon in relation to the daily cycle.)

==== Weekdays during Lent ====
- Evening — Great Compline
- Morning Watches — Midnight Office, Matins, First Hour
- Morning — Third Hour, Sixth Hour, Ninth Hour, Typica, Vespers (sometimes with the Liturgy of the Presanctified Gifts or, on the Annunciation, the Liturgy of Saint John Chrysostom)

==== When there is an all-night vigil ====
On the eves before Great Feasts and, in some traditions, on all Sundays, this grouping is used. However, the All-night vigil is usually abridged so as to not last literally "all-night" and may be as short as two hours; on the other hand, on Athos and in the very traditional monastic institutions, that service followed by the hours and Liturgy may last as long as 18 hours.

- Afternoon — Ninth Hour, Little Vespers, (Note: This is an abbreviated, redundant Vespers) Compline (where it is not read at the commencement of the Vigil)
- Early night — Compline (where it is not the custom for it to follow small vespers), Great Vespers, (Note: On great feast days proceeded by a strict fast (Christmas, Epiphany, and Annunciation on a weekday), the Vigil commences with Great Compline rather than Vespers) a reading, Matins, First Hour

==== When the royal hours are read ====
- Evening — Ninth Hour, Vespers, Compline
- Morning Watches — Midnight Office, Matins
- Morning — First, Third, Sixth, and Ninth Hours and the Typica

==== On the eves of Christmas, Theophany, and Annunciation ====
When the feast is a weekday (or, in the Russian tradition, on any day for Christmas, Theophany), Vespers (with the Liturgy in most instances) is served earlier in the day and so Great Compline functions much as Great vespers does on the vigils of other feast days.

- Evening — Great Compline (in some traditions) and, if there be an All-Night Vigil, the reading, matins, first hour.
- Morning Watches — (unless there be an all-night vigil) midnight office, matins, first hour.

== Sacraments and other services performed as needed ==
=== The Holy Mysteries (Sacraments) ===
==== Baptism ====
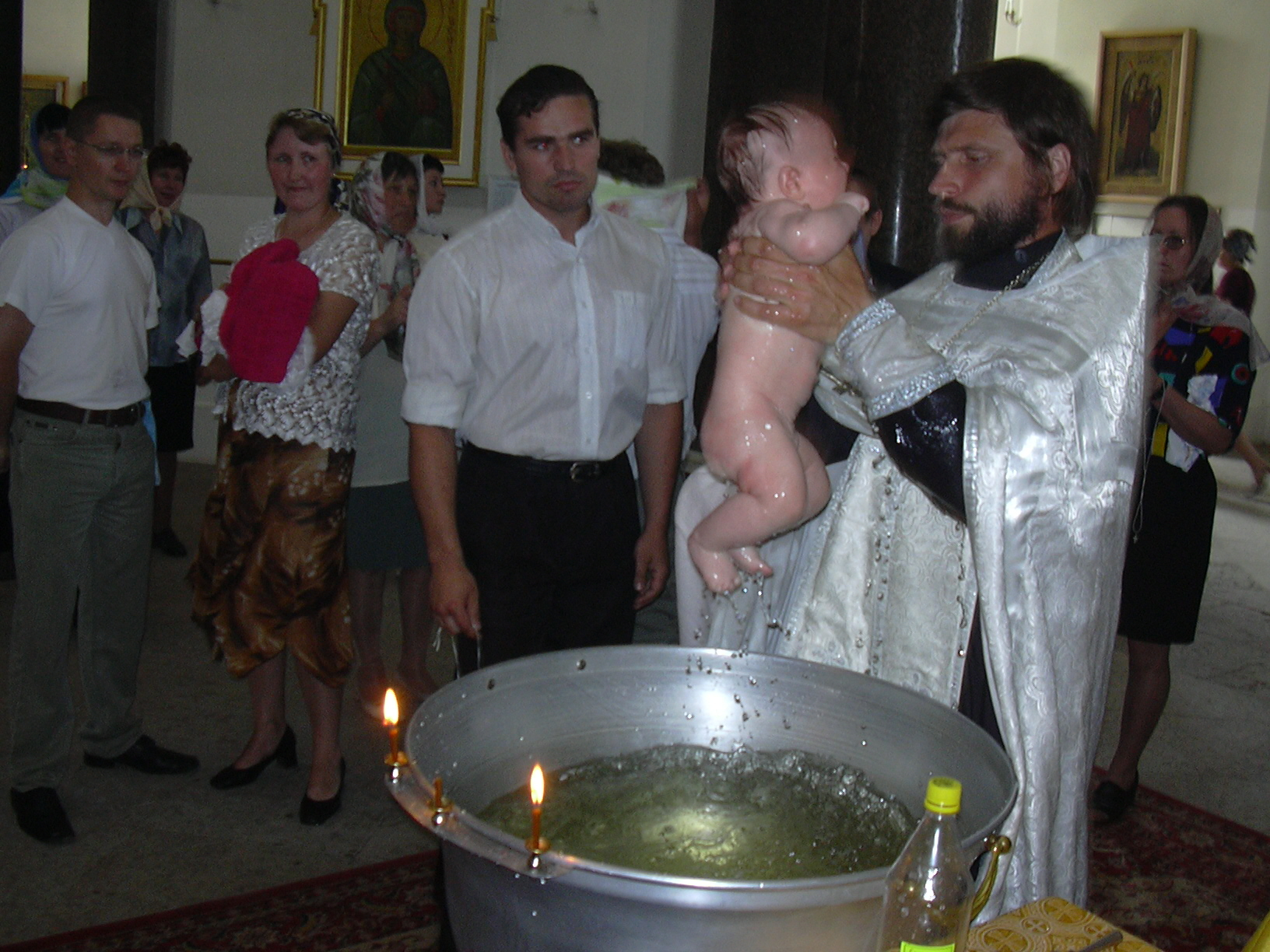
A baptism

Baptism transforms the old and sinful person into a new and pure one; the old life, the sins, any mistakes made are gone and a clean slate is given. Through Baptism a person is united to the Body of Christ by becoming a member of the Orthodox Church. During the service, water is blessed. The catechumen is fully immersed in the water three times, once in the name of each of the figures of the Holy Trinity. This is considered to be a death of the "old man" by participation in the crucifixion and burial of Christ, and a rebirth into new life in Christ by participation in his resurrection. Properly a new name is given, which becomes the person's name.

Children of Orthodox families are normally baptized shortly after birth. Converts to Orthodoxy are usually formally baptized into the Orthodox Church, though exceptions are sometimes made. Those who have left Orthodoxy and adopted a new religion, if they return to their Orthodox roots, are usually received back into the church through the mystery of Chrismation.

Properly, the mystery of Baptism is administered by bishops and priests; however, in emergencies any Orthodox Christian can baptize. In such cases, should the person survive the emergency, it is likely that the person will be properly baptized by a priest at some later date. This is not considered to be a second baptism, nor is it imagined that the person is not already Orthodox, but rather it is a fulfillment of the proper form.

The service of Baptism used in Orthodox churches has remained largely unchanged for more than 1,500 years. St. Cyril of Jerusalem (d. 386), in his Discourse on the Sacrament of Baptism, describes the service; it is largely consistent with the service currently in use in the early 21st century.

==== Chrismation ====
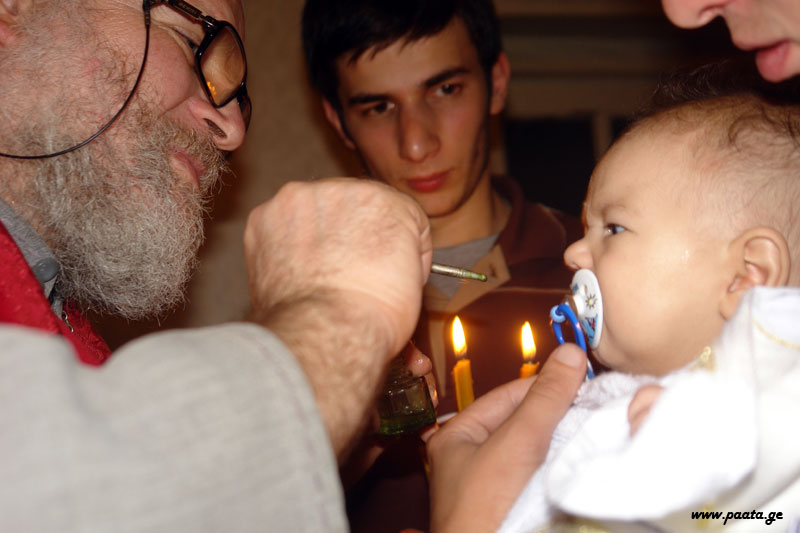
A chrismation

Chrismation grants the gift of the Holy Spirit through anointing with Holy Chrism. It is normally given immediately after baptism as part of the same service. It may also be used to formally receive again lapsed members of the Orthodox Church. As baptism is a person's participation in the death and resurrection of Christ, so chrismation is a person's participation in the coming of the Holy Spirit at Pentecost.

A baptized and chrismated Orthodox Christian is a full member of the Church and may receive the Eucharist regardless of age and/or sex and, indeed, does so beginning at the first liturgy attended after chrismation, infant communion being the universal norm.

The sanctification of chrism may, in theory, be performed by any bishop at any time, but in longstanding practice is performed no more than once a year by hierarchs of most of the autocephalous churches, although some autocephalous churches obtain their chrism from another church. Anointing with it substitutes for the laying-on of hands described in the New Testament, and according to the prayer of consecration of chrism, the apostles made the initial chrism, laying their hands on it, for priests to substitute for laying on of hands for sundry practices, where only the apostles could perform said laying on of hands.

==== Holy Communion (Eucharist) ====
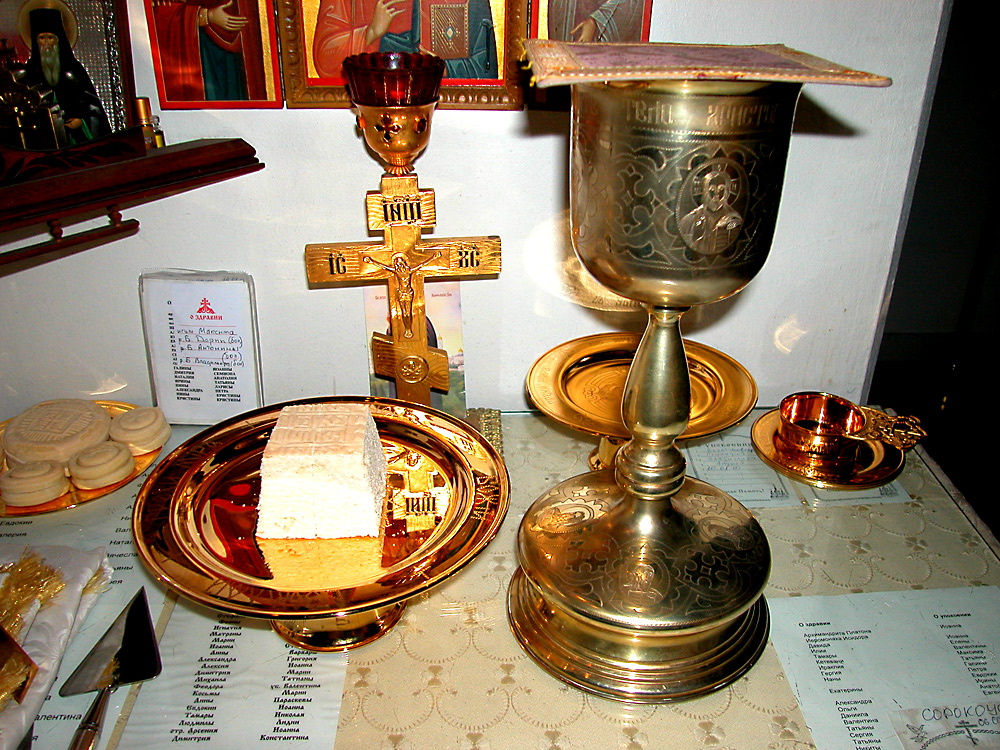
Eucharistic elements prepared for the Divine Liturgy

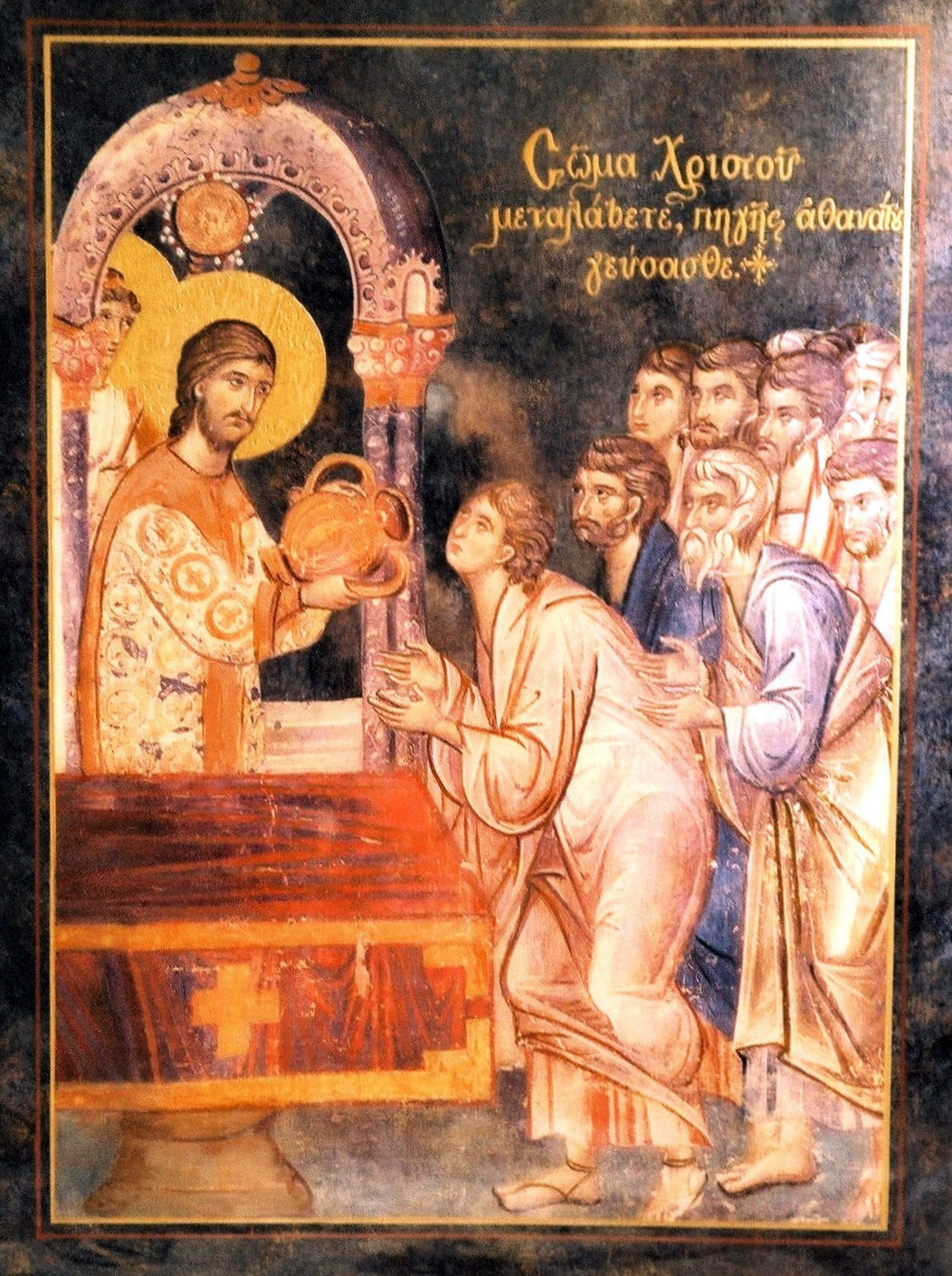
An icon of Holy Communion: "Receive the Body of Christ; taste the Fountain of Immortality."

The Eucharist is at the center of Orthodox Christianity. In practice, it is the partaking of the Body and Blood of Jesus Christ in the midst of the Divine Liturgy with the rest of the church. The bread and wine are believed to be transubstantiated as the genuine Body and Blood of the Christ Jesus through the operation of the Holy Spirit.

Communion is given only to baptized Orthodox Christians who have prepared by fasting, prayer and confession. The wine is administered with a spoon directly into the recipient's mouth from the chalice. From baptism young infants and children are carried to the chalice to receive holy communion.

Because of the Orthodox understanding of mankind's fallen nature in general, those who wish to commune prepare themselves in a way that reflects mankind in paradise. First, they prepare by having their confession heard and the prayer of repentance read over them by a priest. They are encouraged to increase their prayer rule, adding the prescribed prayers in preparation for communing. Finally, they fast completely from food, drink, and sexual activity from the evening before, a time interpreted variously in sundry locations as: from arising from sleep, or from midnight, or from sunset the previous evening.

==== Confession ====
When one who has committed sins repents of them, wishing to reconcile to God and renew the purity of original baptisms, they confess their sins to God before a spiritual guide who offers advice and direction to assist the individual in overcoming their sin. Parish priests commonly function as spiritual guides, but such guides can be any person, male or female, who has been given a blessing to hear confessions. Spiritual guides are chosen very carefully, as this is a mandate that once chosen must be obeyed. Having confessed, the priest lays his hands on the penitent's head while reciting the prayer of absolution.

Sin is a mistake made by the individual, but there is the opportunity for spiritual growth and development. An act of penance (epitemia), if the spiritual guide requires it, is never formulaic, but rather is directed toward the individual and their particular problem, as a means of establishing a deeper understanding of the mistake made, and how to effect its cure. Because full participatory membership is granted to infants, it is not unusual for even small children to confess. Though the scope of their culpability is far less than an older child, they also have an opportunity for spiritual growth.

==== Marriage ====
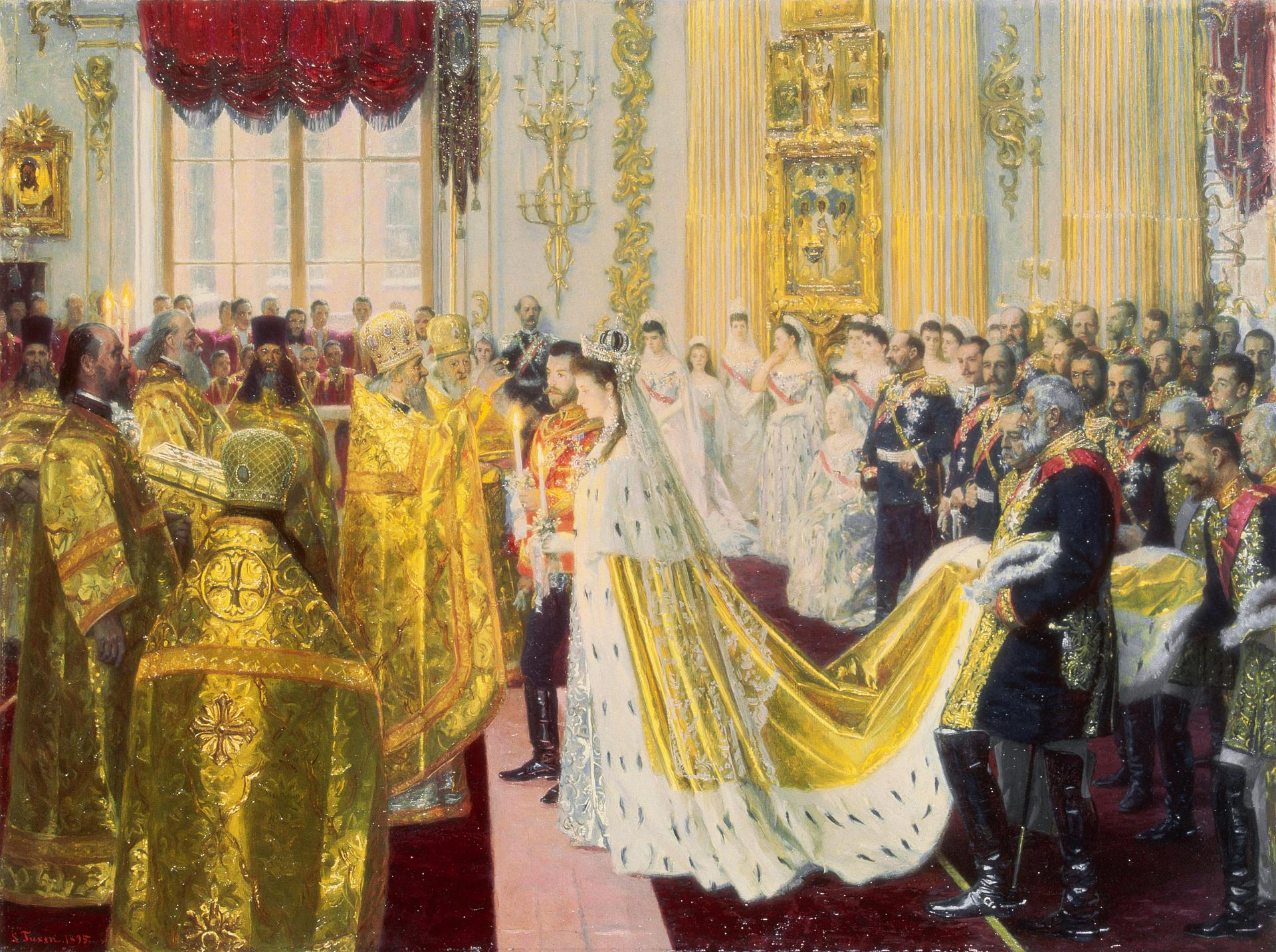
The wedding of Tsar Nicholas II of Russia

From the Eastern Orthodox understanding of marriage, it is one of the holy mysteries or sacraments. As well as in many other Christian traditions, for example in the Catholic Church, it serves to unite a woman and a man in eternal union and love before God, with the purpose of following Christ and His Gospel and raising up a faithful, holy family through their holy union. The church understands marriage to be the union of one man and one woman, and certain Orthodox leaders have spoken out strongly in opposition to the civil institution of same-sex marriage.

Jesus said that "when they rise from the dead, they neither marry nor are given in marriage, but are like angels in heaven" (Mk 12:25). For the Orthodox Christian this passage should not be understood to imply that Christian marriage will not remain a reality in the Kingdom, but points to the fact that relations will not be "fleshy", but "spiritual". Love between wife and husband, as an icon of relationship between Christ and Church, is eternal.

The Church does recognize that there are rare occasions when it is better that couples do separate, but there is no official recognition of civil divorces. For the Orthodox, to say that marriage is indissoluble means that it should not be broken, the violation of such a union, perceived as holy, being an offense resulting from either adultery or the prolonged absence of one of the partners. Thus, permitting remarriage is an act of compassion of the Church towards sinful man. Ecclesiastically divorced Orthodox (not civilly divorced only).

Should a married deacon or priest die, it is common for his wife to retire to a monastery once their children are out of the house. Widowed priests are not allowed to remarry (no priest may be married after his ordination) and also frequently enter monasteries.

The order of a first marriage consists of three distinct services: the Betrothal, the Mystery of Crowning, and the Taking off of the Crowns, but nowadays these are performed in immediate succession. There is no exchange of vows.

==== Holy Orders ====
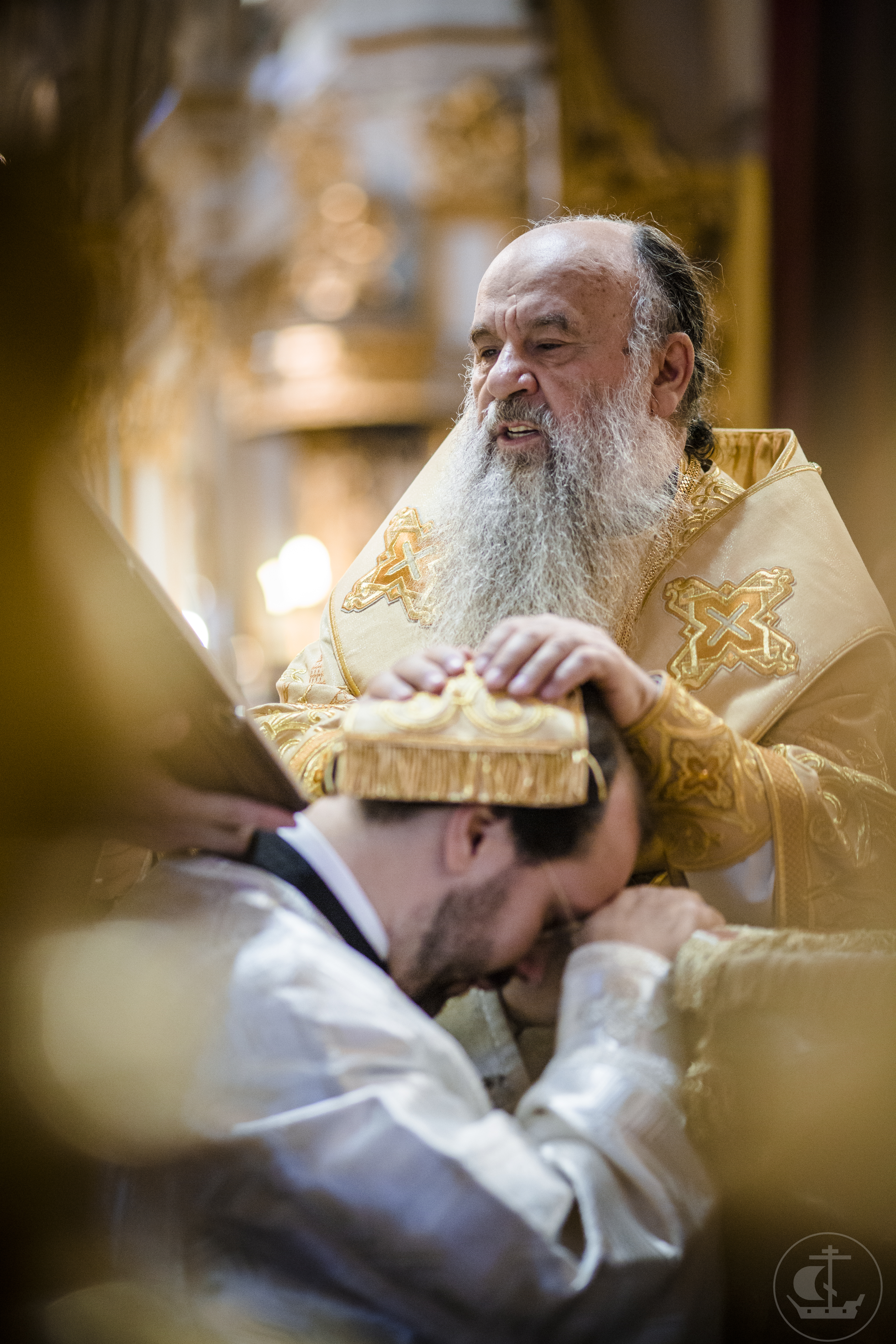
Metropolitan Barsanuphius Sudakov of Saint Petersburg ordains deacon Andrey Bondarev a priest at St. Nicholas Naval Cathedral

Since its founding, the Church spread to different places and its leaders in each region came to be known as episkopoi (overseers, plural of epískopos, overseer—Gr. ἐπίσκοπος), which became "bishop" in English. The other ordained roles are presbýteros (Gr. πρεσβύτερος, elder), which became "prester" and then "priest" in English, and diákonos (Gr. διάκονος, servant), which became "deacon" in English (see also subdeacon). There are numerous administrative positions among the clergy that carry additional titles.

Bishops are always monks. Although someone who is not a monk may be elected to be a bishop, which frequently happens with widowed priests, he must receive a monastic tonsure before consecration to the episcopate. Deacons and priests, however, are typically married, and it is customary that only monks or married men be ordained. It is considered preferable for parish priests to be married as they often act as counsel to married couples and thus can draw on their own experience. Unmarried priests usually are monks and live in monasteries, though when there is of a shortage of married priests, a monk-priest may be assigned to a parish.

A deacon or priest would have to abandon his orders, i.e. be liaised, to marry after ordination; it is common for widowed clergy to enter a monastery. Also, widowed wives of clergy, who are discouraged from remarrying, often become nuns when their children are grown.

Only men can take holy orders, although deaconesses had both liturgical and pastoral functions within the church. This has fallen out of practice, the last deaconess having been ordained in the 19th century; however, in 2016, the Greek Orthodox Church of Alexandria decided to reinstate the order of deaconesses and, in February 2017, Patriarch Theodoros II appointed six nuns to be subdeacons.

==== Unction ====
Anointing with oil, often called "unction", is one of the mysteries administered by the Orthodox Church and it is not reserved only for the dying or terminally ill, but for all in need of spiritual or bodily healing, and with reception of this sacrament comes forgiveness of sins. In Greece, during the Ottoman occupation, when parish priests were not allowed to hear confessions, it became the custom to administer this mystery annually on Great Wednesday to all believers so that all could commune the following days through Pascha. In recent decades, this custom has spread to many other locations.

== Local variations ==
Two main strata exist in the rite, those places that have inherited the traditions of the Russian Church which had been given only the monastic Sabbaite typicon which she uses to this day (Note: Тvпико́нъ сіесть уста́въ (the Typicon which is the Order), p 1) in parishes and cathedrals as well as in monasteries, and everywhere else where some remnant of the cathedral rite remained in use; therefore, the rite as practiced in monasteries everywhere resembles the Russian recension, while non-Russian non-monastic customs differs significantly. For example, in the Russian tradition, the "all-night vigil" is served in every church on Saturday nights and the eves of feast days (although it may be abridged to be as short as two hours) while elsewhere, it is usual to have matins on the morning of the feast; however, in the latter instance, vespers and matins are rather less abridged but the Divine Liturgy commences at the end of matins and the hours are not read, as was the case in the extinct cathedral rite of Constantinople.

Also, as the rite evolved in sundry places, different customs arose; an essay on some of these has been written by Archbishop Basil Krivoshein and is posted on the web.

== Liturgical books ==
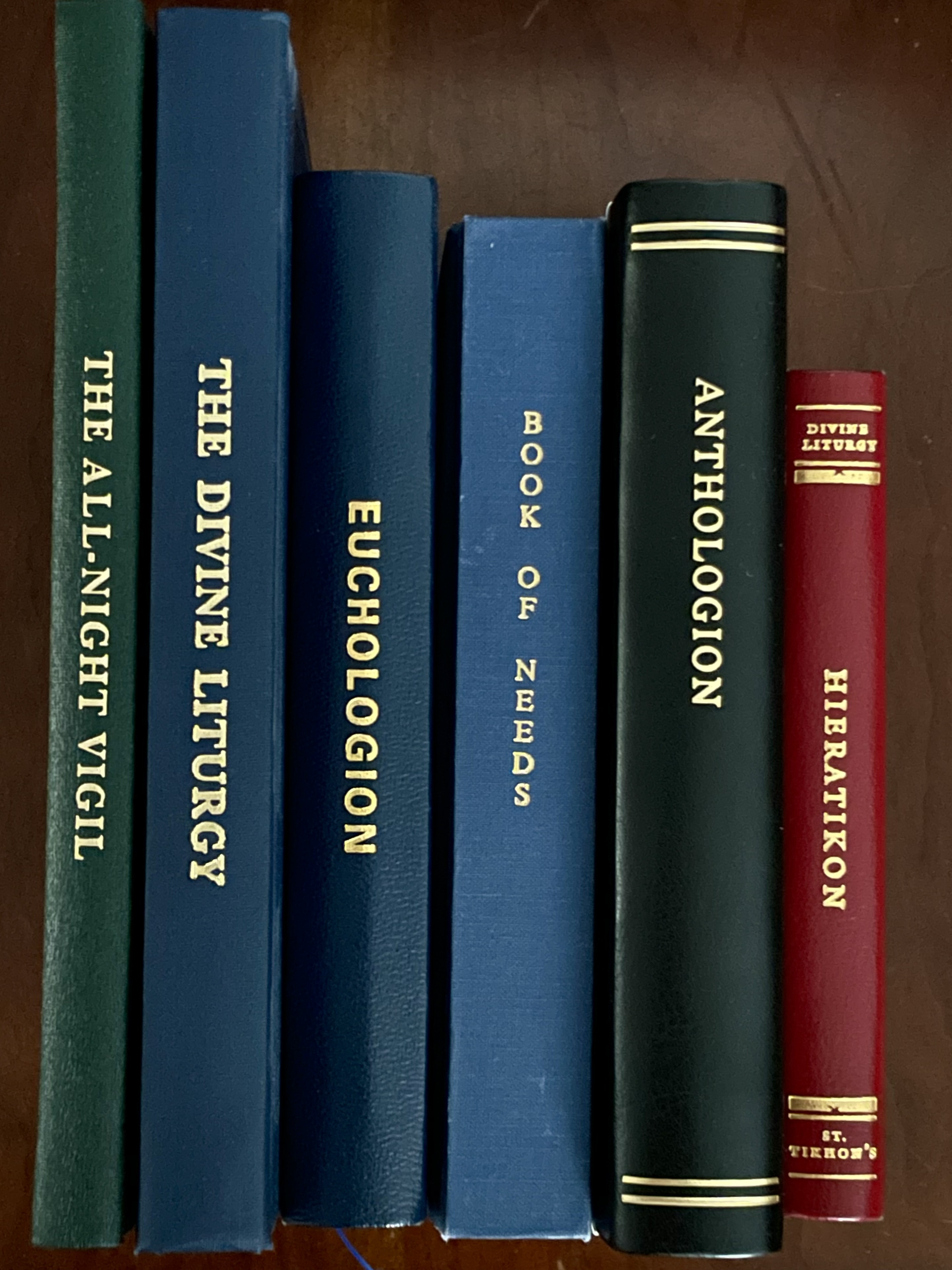
Several Eastern Orthodox and Eastern Catholic Byzantine Rite liturgical books

Horologion (Ὡρολόγιον; Church Slavonic: Часослов, romanized: Chasoslov), or Book of Hours, provides the fixed portions of the Daily Cycle of services (Ancient Greek: ἀκολουθίαι, romanized: akolouthiai) as used by the Eastern Orthodox and Eastern Catholic churches.

Numerous movable parts of the service are inserted into this fixed framework. These are taken from a variety of liturgical books:

- Psalter (Greek: Ψαλτήρ(ιον), Psalter(ion); Church Slavonic: Псалтирь, romanized: Psaltir’) A book containing the 150 Psalms (Note: There is also a Psalm 151 which is often included in the Psalter, though it is not actually chanted during the Divine Services.) divided into 20 sections called Kathismata together with the 9 Biblical canticles which are chanted at Matins; although these canticles had been chanted in their entirety, having over time come to be supplemented by interspersed hymns (analogously to stichera) to form the Canon, the canticles themselves are now only regularly used in a few large monasteries. (Note: Except in the Russian tradition where they are used on weekdays of Great Lent.) The Psalter also contains the various "selected psalms", each composed of verses from a variety of psalms, sung at matins on feast days, as well as tables for determining which Kathismata are to be read at each service; in addition to the Psalms read at the daily offices, all the Psalms are read each week and, during Great Lent, twice a week.
- Oktoechos (Greek: Ὀκτώηχος; Church Slavonic: Октоих, romanized: Oktoikh or Осмогласник, Osmoglasnik)—Literally, the Book of the "Eight Tones" or modes. This book contains a cycle of eight weeks, one for each of the eight echoi (church modes of the Byzantine musical system of eight modes), providing texts for each day of the week for Vespers, Matins, Compline, and (on Sundays) the Midnight Office. The origins of this book go back to compositions by St. John Damascene. The (Great) Oktoechos is also called Parakletike. Oktoechoi containing only Marianic hymns are called Theotokarion. Since the 17th century, different collections of the Octoechos had been separated as own books about certain Hesperinos psalms like the Anoixantarion an octoechos collection for the psalm 103, the Kekragarion for psalm 140, and the Pasapnoarion for the psalm verse 150:6 and also the Doxastarion.
- Menaion (Greek: Μηναῖον; Church Slavonic: Минея, romanized: Mineya)—A twelve-volume set which provides liturgical texts for each day of the calendar year, (Note: On non-leap years, the service for 29 February (St. John Cassian) is sung at compline on 28 February) printed as 12 volumes, one for each month of the year. (Note: The liturgical year begins in September, so the volumes are numbered from 1 for September to 12 for August.) Another volume, the General Menaion contains propers for each class of saints for use when the propers for a particular saint are not available. Additionally, locally venerated saints may have services in supplemental volumes, pamphlets, or manuscripts.
- Menologion (Greek: Μηνολόγιον; Church Slavonic: Месяцеслов, romanized: Mesyatseslov) A collection of the lives of the saints and commentaries on the meaning of feasts for each day of the calendar year, also printed as 12 volumes, appointed to be read at the meal in monasteries and, when there is an all-night vigil for a feast day, between vespers and matins.
- Triodion (Greek: Τριῴδιον; Church Slavonic: Триодь постная, romanized: Triod’ postnaya; Romanian: Triodul), also called the Lenten Triodion. The Lenten Triodion contains propers for:
  - the Pre-Lenten Season
  - the Forty Days of Great Lent itself
  - Lazarus Saturday and Palm Sunday
  - Holy Week
- Pentecostarion (Greek: Πεντηκοστάριον; Church Slavonic: Триодь цветная, romanized: Triod’ tsvetnaya, literally "Flowery Triodon"; Romanian: Penticostar) This volume contains the propers for the period from Pascha to the Sunday of All Saints. This period can be broken down into the following periods:
  - Bright Week (Easter Week) Commencing with matins on Pascha (Easter Sunday) through the following Saturday
  - Paschal Season—The period from Thomas Sunday until Ascension
  - Ascension and its Afterfeast
  - Pentecost and its Afterfeast
  - All Saints Sunday (the Sunday after Pentecost)
- Synaxarion (Greek: Συναξάριον; Georgian: სჳნაქსარი, swnak̕sari; Church Slavonic: Синаксарь, romanized: Sinaksar’; Romanian: Sinaxar)—The Synaxarion contains for each day of the year brief lives of the saints and meanings of celebrated feasts, appointed to be read after the Kontakion and Oikos at Matins.
- Irmologion (Greek: Εἱρμολόγιον, Heirmologion; Church Slavonic: Ирмологий, romanized: Irmology)—Contains the Irmoi chanted at the Canon of Matins and other services. The hymns of the books Heirmologion and Oktoechos had been collected earlier in a book called Troparologion or Tropologion.
- Priest's Service Book (Greek: Ἱερατικόν, Hieratikon; Church Slavonic: Служебник, romanized: Sluzhebnik) It contains the portions of the services which are said by the priest and deacon and is given to a deacon and to a priest with his vestments at ordination. (Note: Originally, the deacon's book and the priest's books were distinct, but upon the invention of printing, it was found more practical to combine them.) The Mega Euchologion contains the portions of the services for the whole year which are said by the priest (Hieratikon), the bishop (Archieratikon) or the deacon (Hierodiakonikon). The two largest parts are the Litourgikon with the liturgies for the whole year and the Hagiasmatarion with the blessings.
- Bishop's Service Book (Greek: Ἀρχιερατικόν Arkhieratikon, Church Slavonic: Чиновник, romanized: Chinovnik) the portions of the services which are said by the Bishop; for the Canonical Hours, this differs little from what is in the Priest's Service Book.
- Prophetologion (Greek: Προφητολόγιον, Georgian: საწინასწარმეტყველო, sacinascarmetqvelo; Church Slavonic: Паремийник, romanized: Paremiynik) It contains the Old Testament Lectionary readings appointed at Vespers and at other services during the Church year.
- Gospel Book (Greek: Εὐαγγέλιον, Evangelion or Εὐαγγελιστάριον, Evangelistarion: Church Slavonic: Евангелие, romanized: Evangelie) Book containing the 4 Gospels laid out as read at the divine services. (Note: In Greek editions the Evangélion or better Ευαγγελιστάριον is laid out in order of the cycle of readings as they occur in the ecclesiastical year, with a section in the back providing the Gospel readings for Matins, Feasts and special occasions. In the Slavic usage, the Evangélion contains the four gospels in canonical order (Matthew, Mark, Luke, John) with annotations in the margin to indicate the beginning and ending of each reading (and an index in the back). The Apostól is likewise edited, the Slavonic Apostól having all of the books of the New Testament (excluding the Gospels and Apocalypse) in their entirety, though not in the same order they are found in most English Bibles (Acts is placed first, followed by the Catholic Epistles, etc.).)
- Apostle Book (Greek: Ἀπόστολος or Πραξαπόστολος, Apostolos or Praxapostolos; Georgian: სამოციქულო, samoc̕ik̕ulo; Church Slavonic: Апостол, romanized: Apostol) Contains the readings for the Divine Liturgy from the Acts of the Apostles and the Epistles together with the Prokeimenon and Alleluia verses that are chanted with the readings.
- Patristic writings Many writings from the Church fathers are prescribed to be read at matins and, during great lent, at the hours; in practice, this is only done in some monasteries and frequently therein the abbot prescribes readings other than those in the written rubrics. Therefore, it is not customary to enumerate all the volumes required for this.
- Collections (Greek: Ἀνθολόγιον, Anthologion; Church Slavonic: Сборник, romanized: Sbornik) There are numerous smaller anthologies available (Note: For instance, the Festal Menaion contains only those portions of the Menaion that have to do with the Great Feasts; and the General Menaion, et cetera.) which were quite common before the invention of printing but still are in common use both because of the enormous volume of a full set of liturgical texts and because the full texts have not yet been translated into several languages currently in use. Some of the anthologies are called Hymnologion.
- Typicon (Greek: Τυπικόν, Typikon; Georgian: ტიპიკონი, tipikoni; Church Slavonic: Типикон, сиесть Устав, romanized: Tipikon, siest’ Ustav) Contains all of the rules for the performance of the Divine Services, giving directions for every possible combination of the materials from the books mentioned above into the Daily Cycle of Services.
- Anastasimatarion (Greek: Ἀναστασιματάριον) is a service book that contains the Anastasima (Resurrectional) hymns of vespers, Sunday matins and other hymns.
- Sticherarion (Greek: Στιχηράριον) it contains the stichera for the morning and evening services throughout the year. Chant compositions in the sticheraric melos can also be found in other liturgical books like the Oktoechos or the Anastasimatarion.
- Hebdomadarion (Greek: Ἑβδομαδάριον) is a liturgical book which contains the paracletic canons of the week.
- Homilies (Greek: Ὁμιλίαι) some homilies of the Church Fathers are recited regularly or on special occasions, such as the Paschal Homily of St. John Chrysostom.

Also some books for special occasions, such as the book for the great week- He Megale Ebdomas, the Dekapentaugoustarion for the 15. August, or the Eklogadion including certain excerpts. The Apostolike Diakonia of the Church of Greece and some Greek-orthodox bishops have also published certain old liturgies. Such as the Liturgy of St. James and others.

== Calendar ==
The fixed portion of the liturgical year begins on 1 September. There is also a movable Paschal cycle fixed according to the date of Pascha (Easter), which is by far the most important day of the entire year. The interplay of these two cycles, plus other lesser cycles influences the manner in which the services are celebrated on a day to day level throughout the entire year.

Traditionally, the Julian Calendar has been used to calculate feast days. Beginning in 1924, several autocephalous churches adopted, for fixed dates, the Revised Julian Calendar which is aligned with the Gregorian calendar; the Paschal cycle, however, continued to be calculated according to the Julian Calendar. Today, some churches and portions of some other churches continue to follow the Julian Calendar while others follow the Revised Julian (Eastern Orthodox) or Gregorian (usually the more Latinized Byzantine Catholic) Calendar. Among Eastern Orthodox, only the Orthodox Church of Finland has adopted the Western calculation of the date of Pascha (see computus); all other Orthodox Churches, and a number of Eastern Catholic Churches, as well as the Ukrainian Lutheran Church, celebrate Pascha according to the ancient rules.

=== Liturgical cycles ===
Various cycles of the liturgical year influence the manner in which the materials from the liturgical books (above) are inserted into the daily services:

==== Weekly cycle ====
Each day of the week has its own commemoration:

- Sunday – Resurrection of Christ
- Monday – The Holy Angels
- Tuesday – St. John the Forerunner
- Wednesday – The Cross and the Theotokos
- Thursday – The Holy Apostles and Saint Nicholas
- Friday – The Cross
- Saturday – All Saints (Note: Including, especially, the Theotokos and the Patron Saint of the local church or monastery.) and the departed

Most of the texts come from the Oktoechos, which has a large collections of hymns for each weekday for each of the eight tones; during great lent and, to a lesser degree, the pre-lenten season, the Lenten Triodion supplements this with hymns for each day of the week for each week of that season, as does the Pentekostarion during the pascal season. Also, there are fixed texts for each day of the week are in the Horologion and Priest's Service Book (e.g., dismissals) and the Kathismata (selections from the Psalter) are governed by the weekly cycle in conjunction with the season.

==== Fixed cycle ====
Commemorations on the Fixed Cycle depend upon the day of the calendar year, and also, occasionally, specific days of the week that fall near specific calendar dates, e.g., the Sunday before the Exaltation of the Cross. The texts for this cycle are found in the Menaion.

==== Paschal cycle ====
The commemorations on the Paschal Cycle ("Movable Cycle") depend upon the date of Pascha (Easter). The texts for this cycle are found in the Lenten Triodion, the Pentekostarion, and the Oktoechos, as well as the Gospel Book and Apostle Book because the daily Epistle and Gospel readings are determined by this cycle. The cycle of the Oktoechos continues through the following great lent, so the variable parts of the lenten services are determined by both the preceding year's and the current year's dates of Easter.

===== 8-week cycle of the octoechos =====
The cycle of the eight Tones is found in the Oktoechos, and is dependent on the date of Easter and commences with the Sunday after (eighth day of) Easter, that week using the first tone, the next week using the second tone, and so, repeating through the week preceding the subsequent Palm Sunday. (Note: Each day of Bright Week (Easter Week) uses propers in a different tone, Sunday: Tone One, Monday: Tone Two, skipping the grave tone (Tone Seven))

===== 11-week cycle of the matins gospels =====
The portions of each of the Gospels from the narration of the Resurrection through the end are divided into eleven readings which are read on successive Sundays at matins; there are hymns sung at Matins that correspond with that day's Matins Gospel.

== List of Churches of Byzantine liturgical tradition ==
=== Eastern Orthodox Churches ===
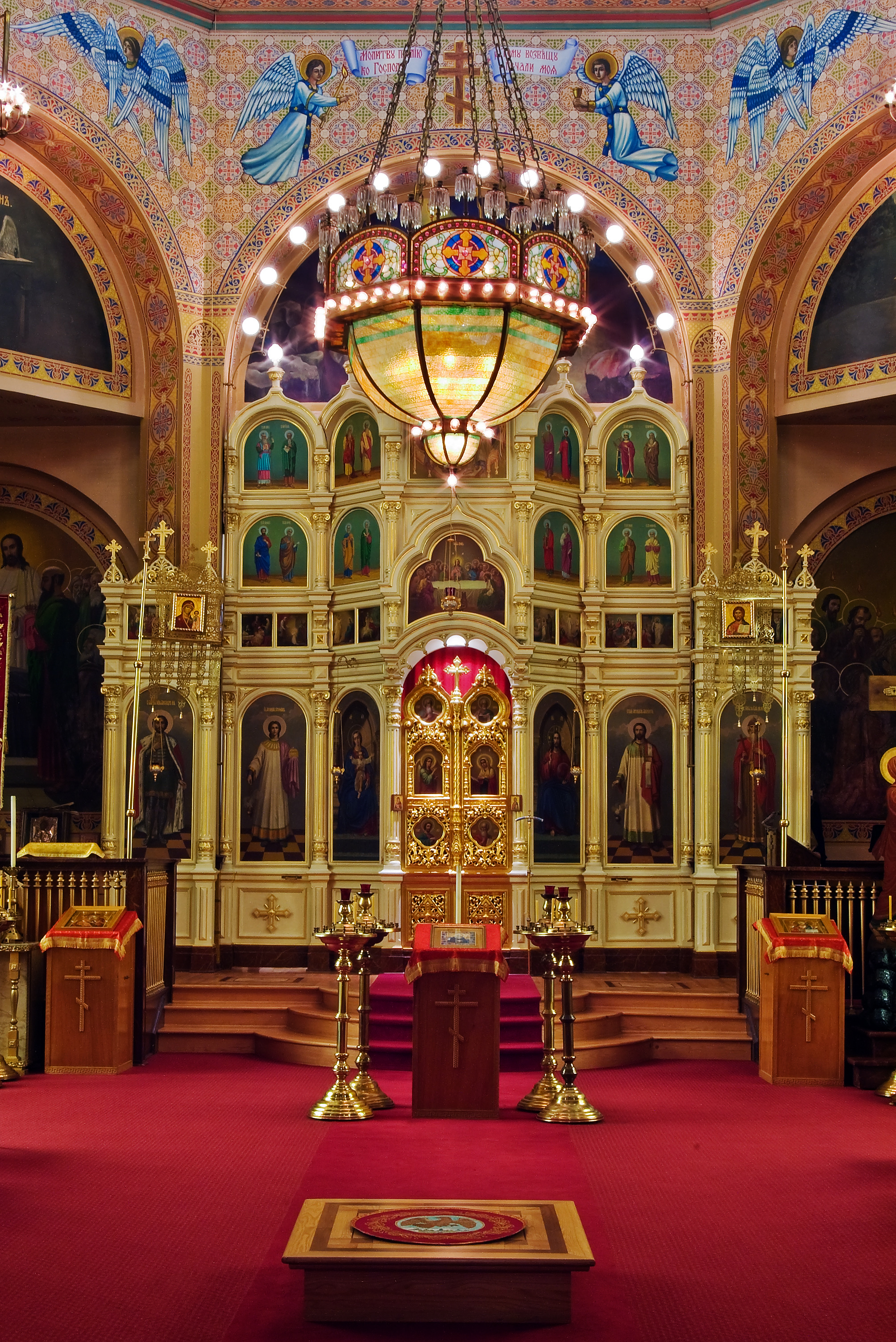
Holy Trinity Russian Orthodox Cathedral, Chicago

Only autocephalous (self-governed) churches are listed; autonomous churches are considered under their mother churches. Those churches which continue to follow the old Julian Calendar are marked with an asterisk (*), while those that follow the Revised Julian Calendar are unmarked.

- Ecumenical Patriarchate of Constantinople
- Greek Orthodox Church of Alexandria
- Greek Orthodox Church of Antioch
- Greek Orthodox Church of Jerusalem*
- Russian Orthodox Church*
- Serbian Orthodox Church*
- Romanian Orthodox Church
- Bulgarian Orthodox Church
- Georgian Orthodox Church*
- Church of Cyprus
- Church of Greece
- Albanian Orthodox Church
- Polish Orthodox Church*
- Orthodox Church of the Czech Lands and Slovakia
- Orthodox Church in America
- Macedonian Orthodox Church*
- Orthodox Church of Ukraine

=== Eastern Catholic Churches ===
Within Eastern Catholicism, several Eastern Catholic Churches are using Byzantine Rite, in its original Greek or some other form (Slavic, Romanian, Hungarian, Albanian, Arabic, Georgian).

==== History ====
During the Early Middle Ages, Byzantine liturgical practices were employed in some (mainly southern) regions of Byzantine Italy. Churches in those regions were returned to papal authority after the Norman conquest of southern Italy in the 11th century, thus creating the base for inclusion of local Byzantine-Rite communities into the Catholic Church. Most notable among those communities was the famous Monastery of Saint Mary of Grottaferrata.

Since the Union of Florence (1439), several efforts were made towards promotion of church union among Orthodox Slavs, who were employing Church Slavic variant of Byzantine Rite in their liturgy. In Latin terminology, Eastern Slavs were also known under an exonymic designation as Ruthenians, and thus an Eastern Slavic form of Byzantine Rite came to be known as the Ruthenian Rite.

Since the 14th century, several regions of the former Kievan Rus' came under the rule of the Grand Duchy of Lithuania, and the Kingdom of Poland, that later created the Polish–Lithuanian Commonwealth. By the end of the 16th century, many among Orthodox Slavs within the borders of the Commonwealth accepted union with the Catholic Church, but kept their Slavic variant of Byzantine Rite, commonly known as Ruthenian Rite in Latin terminology. What was historically called the Ruthenian Uniate Church was set up to accommodate the local Christians and their ecclesiastic leadership under the Catholic umbrella in a state known for its religious tolerance. At the time, the religious boundaries of the Schism were comparatively fluid, and the leadership of what is now western Ukraine had from the 13th to the 15th centuries repeatedly vacillated between eastern and western leadership. The Union of Brest in 1595 finalized the shift of the Orthodox leadership of the lands of White and Little Russia (modern Belarus and Ukraine) to Uniate status. The population of those countries became Greek Catholic without a break in administration. Later, when Muscovite Russia conquered the same, the ecclesiastical leadership largely switched its allegiance again. The modern Ukrainian, Ruthenian, and Hungarian (Note: The Hungarian Greek Catholic Church itself originated with a branch of the Slavonic-speaking Uniate Church) Greek Catholic Churches (approx. 5 million total) compose the great majority of Greek Catholics today, but are only a fraction of the early modern Greek Catholic or Uniate population.

The last Greek Catholic congregation of any size, the Arabic-speaking Melkite Greek Catholic Church (approx. 1.5 million), predominantly resident in Syria and with a large diaspora, is descended from a split within the far more numerous Eastern Orthodox Patriarchate of Antioch (approx. 4.3 million), when in 1729 a claimant to the Antiochene See, removed from his position by the Ottoman authorities, received recognition by the Papacy as the legitimate incumbent. The Melkite Patriarch is presently resident in Damascus, having fled the city of Antioch upon its annexation by Turkey in 1939, a move disputed by Syria.

The Byzantine Rite is distinct from other Eastern Catholic liturgies, themselves using the Aramaic-Syriac, Armenian, and Coptic liturgies of the Oriental Orthodox churches that separated them from both the Greek and Latin worlds before the Great Schism.

==== Particular Churches ====
These Particular Churches are considered sui iuris churches (autonomous) in full communion with the Holy See

- Albanian Greek Catholic Church
- Belarusian Greek Catholic Church
- Bulgarian Greek Catholic Church
- Greek Byzantine Catholic Church
- Greek Catholic Church in Croatia and Serbia
- Hungarian Greek Catholic Church
- Italo-Albanian Catholic Church
- Macedonian Greek Catholic Church
- Melkite Greek Catholic Church
- Romanian Greek Catholic Church
- Russian Greek Catholic Church
- Ruthenian Greek Catholic Church
- Slovak Greek Catholic Church
- Ukrainian Greek Catholic Church

Note: Georgian Byzantine-Rite Catholics are not recognized as a particular Church (cf. canon 27 of the Code of Canons of the Eastern Churches).

=== Byzantine Rite Lutheranism ===
- The Ukrainian Lutheran Church uses liturgical formulae from the Byzantine Rite to form the base text for the Order of Service in the Ukrainian Evangelical Service Book, as well as the Revised Julian Calendar.
- It has also been used by the German Eastern Rite Community (Ostkirchlicher Konvent), St. Valentine's Lutheran Fellowship of the Grand Canyon Synod (ELCA), and in the Evangelical Lutheran Church of the Augsburg Confession in Slovenia.
- Several other Lutheran communities also use the Byzantine Rite that has been adapted to Lutheran theology.

== See also ==
Other Eastern liturgical rites:

- Alexandrian Rite
- Antiochene Rite
- Armenian Rite
- East Syriac Rite
- West Syriac Rite

== Sources ==
- Casiday, Augustine (2012). The Orthodox Christian World. Routledge. pp. 18–19. ISBN 978-0-415-45516-9.
- Fortescue, Adrian (1908). "The Rite of Constantinople". The Catholic Encyclopedia. Vol. 4. New York: Robert Appleton Company. pp. 312–320.
- Harakas, Stanley S. (1987). The Orthodox Church: 455 Questions and Answers. Minneapolis, MN: Light & Life Publishing Company. ISBN 978-0-937032-56-5.
- Krajcar, Jan (1963). "A Report on the Ruthenians and their Errors, prepared for the Fifth Lateran Council". Orientalia Christiana Periodica. 29: 79–94.
- Schulz, Hans-Joachim (2000). Die byzantinische Liturgie: Glaubenszeugnis und Symbolgestalt (in German) (3rd ed.). Trier: Paulinus. ISBN 3-7902-1405-1.
- Shipman, Andrew J. (1912). "Ruthenian Rite". The Catholic Encyclopedia. Vol. 13. New York: Robert Appleton Company. pp. 276–277.
- Sokolof, Archpriest Dimitrii (2001). Manual of the Orthodox Church's Divine Services. Jordanville, New York: Holy Trinity Monastery. ISBN 0-88465-067-7.
- Taft, Robert F. (1992). The Byzantine Rite: A Short History. Collegeville, Minnesota: Liturgical Press. ISBN 0-8146-2163-5.
- Taft, Robert A. (2008) [1978]. A History of the Liturgy of St John Chrysostom (6 volumes). Rome: Pontificio Istituto Orientale.
- Ware, Timothy (1987). The Orthodox Church (2nd ed.). London, UK: Penguin Books. p. 368. ISBN 9780140146561.
- Ware, Timothy (2015). The Orthodox Church (3rd ed.). London, UK: Penguin Books. p. 368. ISBN 9780141980638.Pontifical Oriental Institute
- Wybrew, Hugh (1989). The Orthodox Liturgy: The Development of the Eucharistic Liturgy in the Byzantine Rite. London: SPCK. ISBN 0-281-04416-3.
- The Great Book of Needs: Expanded and Supplemented (Volume 1): The Holy Mysteries. Translated by Saint Tikhon's Monastery. South Canaan, Pennsylvania: Saint Tikhon's Seminary Press. 2000. ISBN 9781878997562.
