= Malabar Rite (disambiguation) =

Malabar Rite may refer to:

- Syro-Malabaric Rite, the liturgical rite of the Syro-Malabar Catholic Church
- the South Indian customs, conventionally called Malabar rites, that 17th-century Jesuit missionaries allowed their converts to maintain
