= Great bows =

Type of bows in Eastern orthodoxy

In Eastern Orthodox service, great bows are bows that consist of three full prostrations of the body to the ground, making the sign of the cross, and reciting the Prayer of Ephrem the Syrian. They begin on Wednesday and Friday of Cheesefare Week and are performed at every service during Great Lent, except Saturdays, Sundays, and Orthodox holidays.
