= Mystery of Crowning =

Eastern Christian wedding ritual

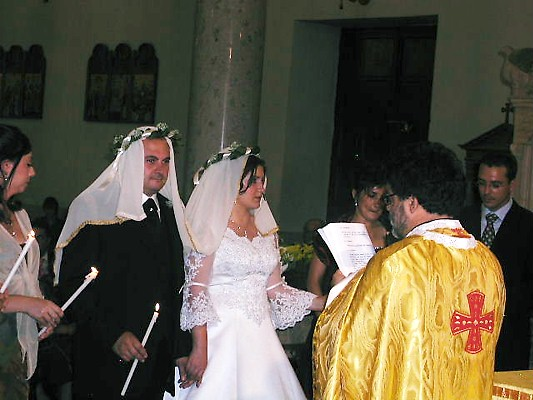
A couple marrying according to the Mystery of Crowning at a Byzantine Rite Catholic wedding

The Mystery of Crowning is a ritual component of the sacrament of marriage in Eastern Christianity. Variations of the crowning ceremony exist in multiple liturgical rites, including the Byzantine, Coptic, West Syriac, and East Syriac Rites of the Eastern Orthodox, Oriental Orthodox, and Eastern Catholic Churches. The crowning ceremony typically features a crown being placed upon the head of both the bride and bridegroom, crowning them as the queen and king of a new family.

== Early history ==
Among early Christians, the pagan origins of crowning during marriage resulted in opposition, including from Tertullian. However, the practice gained acceptance as it was associated with Biblical and Christianized conceptions of victory; Paul the Apostle had in his Second Epistle to Timothy referred to a "Crown of Righteousness" as the eternal reward for righteous persons and John Chrysostom viewed the crown as a symbol of victory over "unregulated sexuality."

== Ritual families ==
=== Byzantine Rite ===
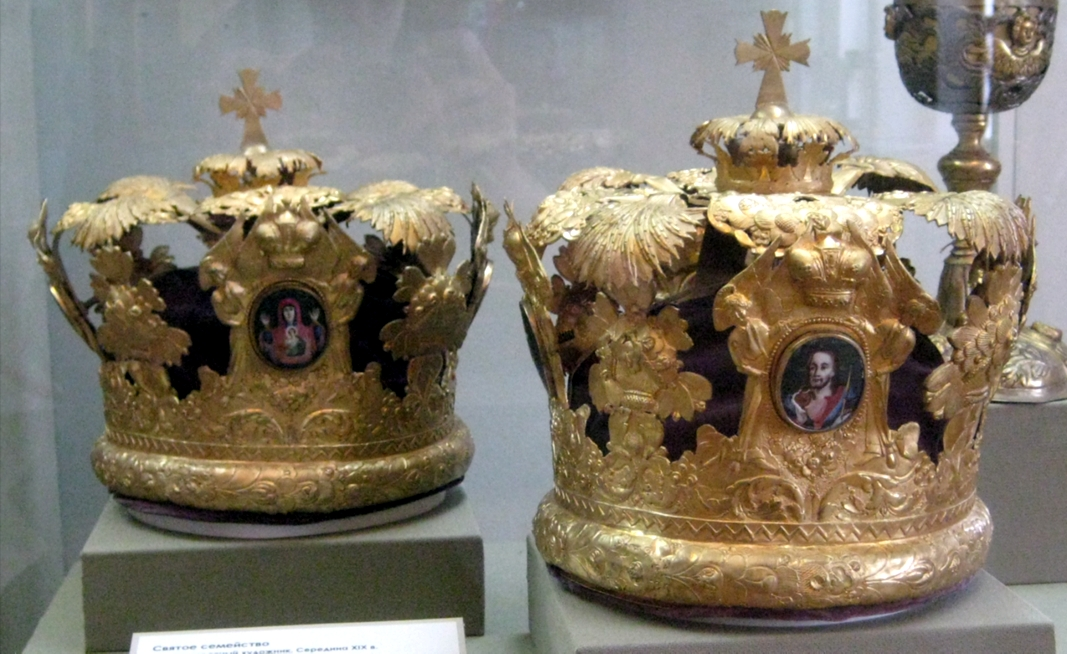
Russian Orthodox wedding crowns

The Mystery of Crowning according to the Byzantine Rite is a lengthy ceremony, the second rite of marriage after a betrothal ceremony. The celebrating priest places the crowns upon first the bridegroom then the bride. After this, it is traditional for the couple to sip from a glass of previously blessed wine and exchange a single kiss. The glass can then be broken in what has been described as a symbol of indissoluble union and compared to a similar Jewish wedding ritual. The Byzantine crowning is considered the basis of crowning rituals in the Coptic Rite and other liturgical families. In the Eastern Orthodox Church, it has been traditionally prohibited from occurring during Lent.

Within the Byzantine Rite, the crowns are considered symbols of authority for the new "domestic church" formed by the creation of a new family. The Byzantine Rite Eastern Catholic Churches, such as the Ruthenian Greek Catholic Church, continue the practice with translations of the ceremony authorized in Church Slavonic and English.

=== West Syriac Rite ===
The Maronite Church, a West Syriac Rite Eastern Catholic church, celebrates the two marriage services of betrothal and crowning. In Maronite practice, the Mystery of Crowning is also called "The Rite of Legal Crowning". The liturgy of the crowning is accompanied by multiple prayers, Psalms, and hymns that intend to emphasize the solemnity of the service; Ephrem the Syrian's "Christ the Heavenly Bridegroom" is recited. Authorized translations of the liturgy exist in Syriac, Arabic, and English.

In the Syriac Orthodox Church, a West Syriac Oriental Orthodox Church, the two typical matrimonial services are celebrated. At the crowning liturgy, the crown is held over the head of the bridegroom by the celebrant, who waves the crown in the shape of a cross. After reciting a prayer, the same is done over the bride. In the United States and Canada, the phrase "and pronounce you husband and wife" is added to the ceremony.

=== East Syriac Rite ===
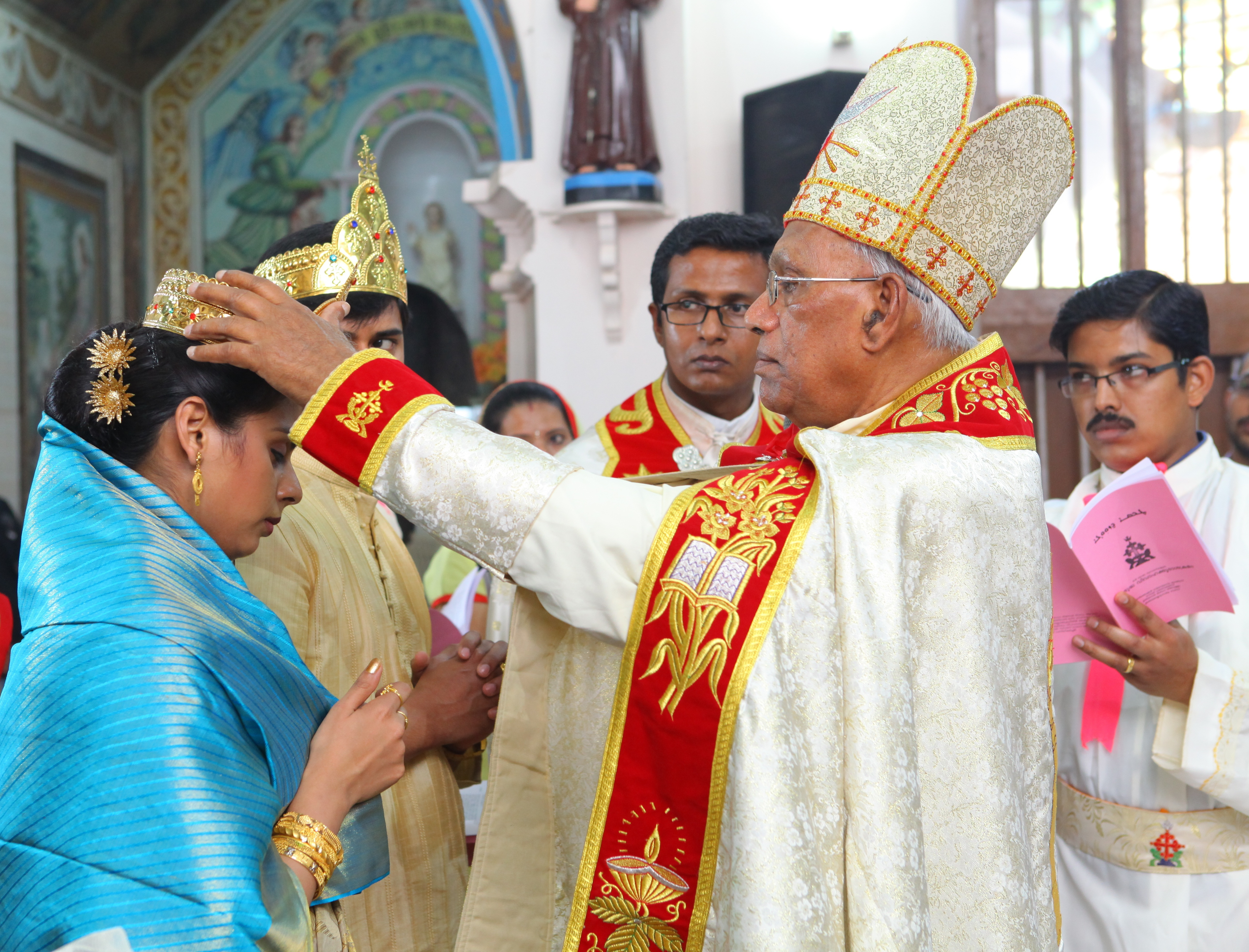
Syro-Malabar Catholic crowning

Within traditional East Syriac Rite practice, the crowning ceremony is celebrated separately from the Holy Qurbana and not considered a sacrament. The ceremony is preceded by the sharing of a cup of mixed water, hanānā (dust from the tomb of a martyr), and wine, which mirrors the presence of Jesus Christ in Communion and is symbolic of the couple becoming one body. This practice is retained by the Assyrian Church of the East in its marriage liturgies. The crowning (kulala) is also practiced within the Chaldean Catholic Church and other members of the Chaldean Iraqi diaspora in the United States.

Crowning was formally a standard practice of the Saint Thomas Christians, and served as a publicly celebrated foil to the betrothal, which was typically held among the family. The local variations of the service sometimes originate from pre-Christian ritual and emphasize the permanence of marriage.

== See also ==
- Bridal crown
- Eastern Catholic liturgy
- Liturgy of Addai and Mari
- Marriage in the Catholic Church
- Syriac Christianity
