= List of compositions by Marc-Antoine Charpentier =

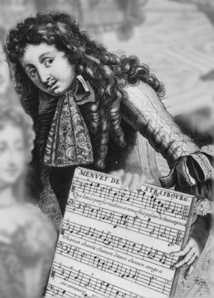
An 1682 engraving though to be of Charpentier

This is a list of compositions by Marc-Antoine Charpentier. His works were catalogued by Hugh Wiley Hitchcock in his Les œuvres de Marc-Antoine Charpentier: Catalogue Raisonné, (Paris: Picard, 1982); references to works are often accompanied by their H (for Hitchcock) number. The following lists (554 H) show the entire production in each genre.

== Sacred vocal works ==
=== Masses (12) ===
- Messe, H.1 (? 1670)
- Messe pour les Trépassés à 8, H.2 (? 1670)
- Messe à 8 voix et 8 violons et flûtes, H.3 (? 1670)
- Messe à quatre chœurs, H.4 (? 1670)
- Messe pour le Port Royal, H.5 (? 1680)
- Messe à 4 voix, 4 violons, 2 flûtes et 2 hautbois pour Mr Mauroy, H.6 (? 1690)
- Messe des morts à quatre voix, H.7, H.7 a (? 1690)
- Messe pour le samedi de Pâques à 4 voix H.8 (? 1690)
- Messe de minuit pour Noël à 4 voix, flûtes, et violons, H.9 (?1690 )
- Messe des morts à 4 voix et symphonie, H.10 (? 1690)
- Assumpta est Maria: Missa sex vocibus cum simphonia, H.11, H.11a (1702)
- Messe pour plusieurs instruments au lieu des orgues, (see instrumental music)

== Other liturgical works ==
=== Séquences ===
- Prose des morts, H.12
- Prose pour le jour de Pâques, H.13
- Prose du Saint Sacrement, H.14
- Stabat Mater pour des religieuses, H.15

=== Antiphons (37) ===
- Antienne, "Regina caeli" H.16
- Autre antienne, "Veni sponsa Christi" H.17
- Salve Regina, H.18
- Ave Regina coelorum, H.19
- Sub tuum praesidium, H.20
- Alma Redemptoris mater, H.21
- Ave Regina, H.22
- Salve Regina à 3 voix pareilles, H.23
- Prélude pour Salve Regina à 3, H.23 a
- Salve Regina à 3 choeurs, H.24
- Antiphona in honorem Beatae Virginis, "Beata es Maria" H.25
- Antienne, H.26
- Salve Regina des Jésuites, H.27
- Antiphona sine organo ad Virginem, H.28
- Antiphona in honorem beate Genovefae / voce sola, H.29
- Antienne, H.30
- Regina coeli voce sola cum (? flauti), H.31
- Antienne à la vierge à 2 dessus, "Regina caeli" H.32
- Regina coeli par Charpentier, H.32 a
- Troisième Regina coeli à 2 dessus, H.32 b
- 33–35 cycle d'Antiennes pour les vêpres d'un confesseur non pontife:
  - Première antienne pour les vêpres d'un confesseur non pontife, H.33
  - Troisième antienne pour les vêpres d'un confesseur non pontife, H.34
  - Cinquième antienne pour les vêpres d'un confesseur non pontife, H.35
- 36–43 Salut de la veille des Ô et les sept Ô suivant le romain:
  - Salut pour la veille des Ö, H.36
  - Premier Ô, H.37
  - Second Ô, H.38
  - Troisième Ô, H.39
  - Quatrième Ô, H.40
  - Cinquième Ô, H.41
  - Sixième Ô, H.42
  - Septième Ô, H.43
- 44–47 cycle d'Antiennes à la Vierge Marie pour l'année liturgique:
  - Antienne à la Vierge depuis les vêpres du samedi de devant le premier dimanche de l'Avant jusqu'aux complies du jour de la Purification inclusivement / Alma Redemptoris à Quatre voix et deux violons, H.44
  - Antienne à la Vierge depuis le lendemain de la purification jusqu'aux vêpres du Jeudi saint exclusivement / Ave regina coelorum à quatre voix et deux dessus de violon, H.45
  - Antienne à la Vierge depuis les complies du samedi saint jusqu'à none inclusivement du premier samedi d'après la Pentecôte / Regina coeli à quatre voix et deux dessus de violon, H.46
  - Antienne à la Vierge depuis les vêpres de la veille de la Trinité jusqu'à none du samedi devant le premier dimanche de l'Avant/ Salve regina à quatre voix et deux violons, H.47
- Antienne à la Vierge pour toutes les saisons de l'année / Inviolata reformé, H.48
- Antienne à 3 voix pareilles pour la veille des Ô, H.49
- 50–52 Antienne pour les vêpres de l'Assomption de la Vierge:
  - Après Dixit Dominus, H.50
  - Pour les mêmes vêpres / Antienne après Laetatus sum, H.51
  - Antienne pour les mêmes vêpres après Lauda Jerusalem Dominum, H.52

=== Hymnes (19) ===
- Jesu corona Virginum: hymne au commun des vierges à deux dessus et une flûte, H.53
- Hymne du Saint Esprit à trois voix pareilles avec symphonie et choeur si l'on veut, H.54
- 55–57 In Sanctum Nicasium Rothomagensem Archie piscopum et Martyrem:
  - Hymnus ad Vesperas, H.55
  - Hymnus in eundem at matutinem, H.56
  - In eundem ad laudes, H.57
- Pange lingua, H.58
- Gaudia Virginis Mariae, H.59
- Hymne pour toutes les fêtes de la Vierge, H.60
- Pour un reposoir / Pange flingua, H.61
- Pange flingua pour des religieuses / Pour le Port Royal, H.62
- Hymne à la Vierge, "Ave maris stella" H.63
- Hymne du Saint Sacrement, H.64
- Ave maris stella, H.65
- Hymne du Saint Esprit / Veni Creator, H.66
- Ave maris stella, H.67
- Pange lingua à 4 voix pour le Jeudi saint, H.68
- Veni Creator pour un dessus seul au catéchisme, H.69
- Veni Creator Spiritus pour un dessus seul pour le catéchisme, H.70
- Iste Confessor, H.71

=== Magnificat settings (10) ===
- Magnificat, H.72
- Magnificat, H.73
- Magnificat à 8 voix et 8 instruments, H.74
- Magnificat à 3 dessus, H.75
- Canticum B.V.M. H.76
- Prélude pour le premier Magnificat à 4 voix sans instruments, H.76 a
- Magnificat, H.77
- Magnificat, H.78
- Troisième Magnificat à 4 voix avec instruments, H.79
- Magnificat, H.80
- Magnificat pour le Port Royal, H.81

=== Litany of Loreto settings (9) ===
- Litanies de la Vierge à 3 voix pareilles, H.82
- Litanies de la Vierge à 6 voix et deux dessus de viole, H.83
- Litanies de la Vierge à 3 voix pareilles avec instruments, H.84
- Litanies de la Vierge, H.85
- Litanies de la Vierge à deux dessus et une basse chantante, H.86
- Litanies de la vierge à 4 voix, H.87
- Litanies de la Vierge à 4 voix, H.88
- Litanies de la Vierge, H.89
- Courtes Litanies de la Vierge à 4 voix, H.90

=== Tenebrae lessons and responsories (54) ===
- Leçon de ténèbres, H.91
- Autre leçon de ténèbres / Troisième du Mercredi saint, H.92
- Autre leçon de ténèbres / 3ème du Jeudi saint, H.93
- Autre Jerusalem pour les leçons de ténèbres à 2 voix / pour la la seconde du Jeudi saint, H.94
- Troisième leçon du Vendredi Saint, H.95
- 96–110 Les neuf leçons de ténèbres:
  - Première leçon du Mercredi saint, H.96
  - Seconde leçon du Mercredi saint, H.97
  - Troisième leçon de Mercredi saint, H.98
  - Lettres hébraïques de la première leçon de ténèbres du Vendredi saint, H.99
    - Première lettre, H.99 a
    - Seconde lettre, H.99 b
    - Troisième lettre, H.99 c
  - Ritournelles pour la première leçon de ténèbres du Vendredi saint, H.100 :
    - Prélude devant De lamentatione pour le Jeudi et le Vendredi saint, H.100 a
    - Misericordiae Domini tacet / Ritournelles après miserationes jus, H.100 b
    - Les violes / Novi dilucolo tacet / Ritournelles après fides tua, H.100 c
    - Ritournelles pour la première leçon du vendredi, H.100 d
    - Ritournelles pour la première leçon du vendredi, H.100 e
    - Ritournelles pour la première leçon du vendredi, H.100 f
    - Ritournelles pour la première leçon du vendredi, H.100 g
  - Prélude pour la première leçon de ténèbres du Mercredi saint, H.101
  - Première leçon de ténèbres du Jeudi saint, H.102
  - Seconde leçon du Jeudi Saint, H.103
  - Troisième leçon du Jeudi saint, H.104
  - Première leçon du Vendredi saint, H.105
  - Première leçon du Vendredi saint (transposée en Sol Majeur), H.105
  - Seconde leçon du Vendredi saint, H.106
  - Seconde leçon du Jeudi saint à voix seule, H.107
  - Troisième leçon du Mercredi à trois parties, H.108
  - Troisième leçon du Jeudi saint à 3 voix, H.109
  - Troisième leçon du Vendredi saint, H.110
- 111–119 Les neuf répons de chaque jour / Les neuf répons du Mercredi saint:
  - Premier répons après la première leçon du premier nocturne, H.111
  - Second répons après le seconde leçon du premier nocturne, H.112
  - Troisième répons après la troisième leçon du premier nocturne, H.113
  - Quatrième répons après la première leçon du second nocturne, H.114
  - Cinquième répons après la seconde leçon du second nocturne, H.115
  - Sixième répons après la troisième leçon du second nocturne, H.116
  - Septième répons après la première leçon du troisième nocturne, H.117
  - Huitième répons après la seconde leçon du troisième nocturne, H.118
  - Neuvième répons après la troisième leçon du troisième nocturne du Mercredi saint, H.119
- 120–122 Leçons de ténèbres:
  - Première leçon de ténèbres du Mercredi saint pour une basse, H.120
  - Première leçon de ténèbres du Jeudi saint pour une basse, H.121
  - Première leçon de ténèbres du Vendredi saint pour une basse, H.122
- 123–125 Leçons de ténèbres:
  - Troisième leçon de ténèbres du Mercredi saint pour une basse taille avec 2 flûtes et deux violons, H.123
  - Troisième leçon de ténèbres du Jeudi saint pour une basse taille avec 2 flûtes et 2 violons, H.124
  - Troisième leçon de ténèbres du Vendredi saint pour une basse taille avec 2 flûtes et deux violons, H.125
- Second répons après la seconde leçon du premier nocturne du Mercredi saint, H.126
- Premier répons après la première leçon du second nocturne du Jeudi saint, H.127
- Second répons après la seconde leçon du premier nocturne du Jeudi saint, H.128
- Second répons après la seconde leçon du second nocturne du Jeudi Saint, H.129
- Second répons après la seconde leçon du premier nocturne de Vendredi saint, H.130
- Troisième répons après la 3ème leçon du second nocturne du Vendredi saint, H.131
- Troisième répons après la troisième leçon du second nocturne du Mercredi saint, H.132
- Premier répons après la première leçon du second nocturne du Jeudi saint, H.133
- Second répons après la seconde leçon du second nocturne du Vendredi saint, H.134
- 135–137 Leçons de ténèbres:
  - Troisième leçon de ténèbres du Mercredi saint, H.135
  - Troisième leçon de ténèbres du Jeudi saint, H.136
  - Troisième leçon de ténèbres du Vendredi saint, H.137
- 138–140 Leçons de ténèbres:
  - Seconde leçon de ténèbres du Mercredi saint, H.138
  - Seconde leçon de ténèbres du Jeudi saint, H.139
  - Seconde leçon de ténèbres du Vendredi saint, H.140
- 141–143 Leçons de ténèbres:
  - Troisième leçon de ténèbres du Mercredi saint pour une basse, H.141
  - Troisième leçon de ténèbres du Jeudi saint pour une basse, H.142
  - Troisième leçon de ténèbres du Vendredi saint pour une basse, H.143
- Répons après la première leçon de ténèbres du Jeudi saint pour une haute taille et 2 flûtes, H.144

=== Te Deum settings (6) ===
- Te Deum à 8 voix H.145 (1670)
- Te Deum, H.146 (1690)
- Te Deum à 4 voix, H.147 (1690)
- Te Deum à 4 voix, H.148 (1698–99)
- Te Deum (lost)
- Te Deum (lost)

== Psalms (84) ==
- Psaume 112, H.149
- Paume 126, H.150
- Confitebor à 4 voix et 2 violons, H.151
- Psaume 116, H.152
- Psaume 109, H.153
- Psaume 111, H.154
- Psaume 131, H.155
- De profundis, H.156
- Miserere à 2 dessus, 2 flûtes, et basse continue, H.157
- Psalmus David, H.158
- Psaume 116, H.159
- Psalmus 2 us 6 us supra centisium à 4 voix "Nisi Dominus", H.160
- Prélude pour Nisi Dominum à 4 voix sans instruments, H.160 a
- Psalmus David vigesimus primus post centesimum, H.161
- Exaudiat à 8 voix, flûtes et violons, H.162
- Psalmus David VIII, H.163
- Prière pour le Roi, H.164
- Precacio pro Rege, H.165
- Precacio pro Filio Regis, H.166
- Quam dilecta: Psalmus David octogésimus tertius, H.167
- Psalmus David 5 us (recte 2 us) in tempore belli pro Rege, H.168
- Prélude pour quatre fremuerunt ventes à 8 voix, H.168 a
- Psalmus David 125 us, H.169
- Psalmus David centesimus trigesimus sextus: Super flumina Babylonis, H.170
- Super flumina / Psalmus 136 octo vocibus cum instrumentis, H.171
- Prélude pour Super flumina, H.171 a
- Psalmus 3 us, H.172
- Miserere à deux voix, une haute-contre et basse continue, H.173
- Psaume 41, H.174
- Psaume 1, H.175
- Psaume 97, H.176
- Psaume 148, H.177
- Psalmus Davidis centisemus vigesimus septimus, H.178
- Psalmus David septuagesimus quints, H.179
- Exaudiat pour le Roi à 4, H.180
- Premier prélude pour l'Exaudiat à 4 voix sans instruments D la re sol à 2 violons, H.180 a
- Second prélude à 4 violons pour le même Exaudiat, H.180 b
- Psalmus David octogesimus quartus, H.181
- Psalmus David centesimus sexdecimus sine organo, H.182
- Psalmus David 107, H.183
- Psalmus David, 5 us (recte 2 dus), H.184
- Psalmus David nonagesimus primus, H.185
- Psalmus David octogesimus tertius, H.186
- Psalmus 86, H.187
- Psalmus 62, H.188
- De profundis, H.189
- Psalmus 109 us: Dixit Dominus à 8 vocibus et todidem instrumentis, H.190
- Psalmus 147, H.191
- Psaume 46, H.192
- Psalmus David 50 mus / Miserere des Jésuites, H.193
- Prélude pour le Miserere à 6 voix et instruments, H.193 a
- Psalmus David nonagesimus 9 nus, H.194
- Bonum est confiteri Domino / Psalmus David 91 us, H.195
- Psalmus David 12 us, H.196
- Psalmus David 109 us, H.197
- Prélude pour le premier Dixit Dominus en petit en G re sol bémol, H.197 a
- Psalmus David 4 us, H.198
- Psalmus David Centesimus Undecimus, "Beatus vir" H.199
- Prélude pour le premier Beatus vir à 4 voix, H.199 a
- Psaume 110 e: "Confitebor tibi", H.200
- Prélude pour le premier Confitebor à 4 voix sans instruments, H.200 a
- Psalmus David 34 us, H.201
- Dixit Dominus: Psalmus David 109 us, H.202
- Dixit Dominus: Psalmus David 109 / Prélude, H.202 a
- Psalmus supra centesimum duodecimus, "Laudate pueri" H.203
- Prélude pour Laudate pueri Dominum à 4 voix sans instruments en G re sol naturel, H.203 a
- Psaume 109, H.204
- Gloria Patri pour le De profundis en C sol ut bémol à quatre voix, 4 violons et flûtes, H.205
- Psalmus David 5 us post septuagesimum, H.206
- Psalmus Davidis post octogesimum septimus, H.207
- Psalmus undecimus Davidis post centesimum: Beatus vir qui timet Dominum 4 vocibus cum symphonia, H.208
- Psalmus David 115 us, "Credidi propter" H.209
- Prélude pour Credidi à 4 voix sans instruments en sol ut, H.209 a
- Lauda Jerusalem: Psalmus David 147 us, H.210
- Psalmus Davidis vigesimus nonus super centesimum / De profundis à quatre voix, H.211
- Psalmus David 120 us quatuor vocibus, H.212
- De profundis, H.213
- De profundis, H.213 a
- Psalmus Davidis decimus sextus post centesimum, H.214
- Psalmus David 67 us, H.215
- Psalmus Davidis CXXI us, H.216
- Psalmus 123 us, H.217
- Psalmus David 45 us, H.218
- Miserere Psalmus 50 à 4 voix et 4 instruments, H.219
- Psalmus David 110 us à 4 voix, "Confitebor tibi Domine" H.220
- Psalmus David 111 à 4 voix, "Beatus vir" H.221
- Court De profundis à 4 voix, H.222
- Laudate Dominum omnes gentes octo vocibus et totidem instrumentis, H.223
- Beatus vir qui timet Dominum 8 vocibus et totidem instrumentis, H.224
- Confitebor à 4 voix et instruments, H.225
- Dixit Dominus pour le Port Royal, H.226
- Laudate Dominum omnes gentes pour le Port Royal, H.227
- Psalmus David LXX: 3e psaume (sic) du 1er nocturne du Mercredi saint, H.228
- Psalmus David 26 tus: 3e psaume (sic) du 1er nocturne du Jeudi saint, H.229
- Psalmus David 15 us: 3e psaume (sic) du 1er nocturne du Vendredi saint, H.230
- Psaume 126, H.231
- De profundis, H.232

== Motets ==
=== Elevation motets (48) ===
- Elévation, "Ave verum corpus" H.233 (? 1670)
- Elévation,.H.234 (? 1670)
- O sacrum convivium à 3 dessus: Elevatio, H.235 (? 1670)
- Elévation, H.236 (? 1670)
- Elévation pour la paix, H.237 (?1670)
- Prélude en A pour O Bone Jesu à 3 voix pareilles pour la paix, H.237 a
- Elévation, H.238 (? 1670)
- O sacrum à trois, H.239
- O sacrum convivium de Charpentier pars, H.239 a (1670)
- O sacrum pour trois religieuses, H.240
- Elévation, H.241
- Ecce panis voce sola / Elévation, H.242
- Panis angelicus voce sola / Elévation, H.243
- Elévation à 2 dessus et une basse chantante, H.244
- Elévation, H.245
- Elévation, H.246
- Elévation, H.247
- Elévation, H 248
- Elévation, H.249
- Elévation, H.250
- Elévation à 5 sans dessus de violon, "Transfige dulcissime Jesu" H.251
- Elévation, H.252
- O amor: Elévation à 2 dessus et une basse chantante ou pour une haute contre, taille et basse chantante en le transposant un ton plus haut, H.253
- Prélude pour O amor à 3 violons, H.253 a
- Elévation, "O pretiosum et admirabile convivium" H.254
- Elévation, H.255
- Elévation à 3 dessus, H.256
- Elevation, "Gustate et videte" H.257
- Elevation, "Nonne Deo subjecta erit" H.258
- Elévation, H.259
- Elevation. H.260
- O salutaris à 3 dessus, H.261
- O salutaris, H.262
- Elévation, H.263
- Elévation au Saint Sacrement, H.264
- Elévation à 3 voix pareilles, H.264 a
- Elévation, H.265
- Elévation, H.266
- Elévation, H.267
- Elévation à voix seule pour une taille, H.268
- A l'elévation de la sainte hostie, H.269
- Pour le Saint Sacrement à 3 voix pareilles, H.270
- Pour le Saint Sacrement à 3 voix pareilles, H.271
- Elévation à 2 dessus et une basse, H.272
- Elévation, H.273
- Elévation, H.274
- Elévation, H.275
- Elévation, H.276
- Elévation, "Cantemus Domino" H.277
- Motet du Saint Sacrement à 4 / Charpentier, H.278
- Motet à voix seule pour une Elévation, H.279
- Motet du Saint Sacrement, H.280

=== "Domine salvum" motets (25) ===
- Domine salvum, H.281
- Domine salvum, H.282
- ...Domine salvum de la messe à 8, H.283
- Domine salvum à 3 voix pareilles avec orgue, H.284
- Domine salvum, H.285
- Domine Salvum, H.286
- Domine salvum, H.287
- Domine salvum pour trois religieuses, H.288
- Domine salvum, H.289
- Domine salvum sine organo en C sol ut, H.290
- Domine salvum, H.291
- Domine salvum, H.292
- Domine salvum, H.293
- Domine salvum, H.294
- Domine salvum, H.295
- Domine salvum, H.296
- Domine salvum pour un haut et un bas dessus, H.297
- Domine salvum, H.298
- Domine salvum, H.299
- Domine salvum à 3 dessus, H.300
- Domine salvum à 3 voix pareilles, H.301
- Domine salvum à 3 voix pareilles, H.302
- Domine salvum, H.303
- Domine salvum, H.304
- Motet, "Domine salvum fac regem" H.305

=== Occasional motets (85) ===
- Pour St Bernard, "Gaudete fideles" H.306
- Pour St Augustin, "O doctor optime" H.307
- Pour Pâques, "Haec dies quam fecit" H.308
- Nativité de la Vierge, "Sicut spina rosam" H.309
- St François, "Jubilate Deo fideles" H.310
- Motet pour les trépassés à 8 / Plainte des âmes du purgatoire, H.311
- O filii à 3 voix pareilles, H.312
- Pour la conception de la Vierge, "Conceptio tua Dei genitrix" H.313
- In nativitatem Domini canticum, H.314
- Pour Ste Anne, "Gaude felix Anna" H.315
- In circumcisione Domini, H.316
- Pour le jour de Ste Geneviève, H.317
- In festo purificationis, H.318
- Motet pour la Trinité, H.319
- Motet de St Louis, H.320
- Motet de St Laurent, H.321
- Motet de la Vierge pour toutes ses fêtes, H.322
- In honorem santi Ludovici Regis Galliae canticum tribus vocibus cum symphonia, H.323
- In nomine Jesu, H.324
- Canticum Annae, H.325
- Graciarum actiones ex sacris codicibus excerptae pro restituta serenissimi Galliarum Delphini salute, H.326
- Motet pour toutes les fêtes de la Vierge, H.327
- Supplicacio pro defunctis ad beatam Virginem, H.328
- Pour un reposoir, H.329
- Gaudia beatae Virginis Mariae, H.330
- Luctus de morte augustissimae Mariae Theresiae reginae Galliae, H.331
- In honorem Sancti Ludovici regis Galliae, H.332
- Pro omnibus festis B.V.M. H.333
- Motet pour la Vierge, "Alma Dei creatoris" H.334
- 335–338 Quatuor Anni Tempestates:
  - Ver, H.335
  - Aestas, H.336
  - Prélude pour l'été 3 flûtes, H.336 a
  - Autumnus, H.337
  - Hyems, H.338
- Chant joyeux de Pâques, H.339
- Ad beatam Virginem canticum, H.340
- Gratiarum actiones pro restituta Regis christianissimi sanitate anno 1686, H.341
- Ste Thérèse, H.342
- Magdalena lugens voce sola cum symphonia, H.343
- Magdalena Lugens, H.343 a
- In festo corporis Christi canticum, H.344
- Canticum Zachariae, H.345
- Pour le Saint Sacrement au reposoir, H.346
- In honorem Sti Benediti, "Exultet omnium" H.347
- Motet du Saint Sacrement pour un reposoir, H.348
- 349–351 Pour la Passion de Notre Seigneur:
  - Première pause, "O crux ave" H.349
  - Seconde pause, "Popule meus" H.350
  - Pour le jour de la Passion de Notre Seigneur, H.351
- Second motet pour le catéchisme à la pause du milieu / à la Vierge, H.352
- In Assumptione Beatae Mariae Virginis, H.353
- Motet pour St François de Borgia, H.354
- In honorem Sancti Xaverij canticum, H.355
- Canticum de Sto Xaverio, H.355 a
- O filii pour les voix, violons, flûtes et orgue, H.356
- In purificationem B. V. M canticum, "Psallite caelites" H.357
- In festo corporis Christi canticum, H.358
- Motet pour la Vierge à 2 voix, "Omni die hic Mariae" H.359
- Pour la Vierge, "Felix namque es" H.360
- Pour plusieurs martyrs / motet à voix seule sans accompagnement, H.361
- Pour le Saint Esprit, H.362
- Motet pendant la guerre, H.363
- Pour le Saint Esprit, H.364
- Pour Le Saint Esprit, H.364 a
- In honorem Sancti Ludovici regis Galliae canticum, H.365
- In honorem Sancti Ludovici regis Galliae canticum, H.365 a
- Pour le Saint Esprit, H.366
- La prière à la vierge du père Bernard, H.367
- Motet de St Joseph, H.368
- Pro virginie non martyre, H.369
- Pour le catéchisme, "Gloria in excelsis Deo" H.370
- A la Vierge à 4 voix pareilles, H.371
- Pour la seconde fois que le Saint Sacrement vient au même reposoir, H.372
- Pour Marie Madeleine, "Sola vivebat in antris" H.373
- Pour Ste Thérèse, "Flores o Gallia" H.374
- Pour un confesseur non pontife, "Euge serve bone" H.375
- Pour un confesseur, H.376
- Pour tous les saints, H.377
- Pour le Carême, H.378
- Pour plusieurs fêtes, H.379
- 380–389 Méditations pour le Carême:
  - Première méditation, H.380
  - Deuxième méditation, H.381
  - Troisième méditation, H.382
  - Quatrième méditation, H.383
  - Cinquième méditation, H.384
  - Sixième méditation, H.385
  - Septième méditation, H.386
  - Huitième méditation, H.387
  - Neuvième méditation: Magdalena lugens, H.388
  - Dixième méditation, H.389
- Motet de la Vierge à 4, H.390

=== Dramatic motets (oratorios) (34) ===
- Judith sive Bethulia liberata, H.391 (1675)
- Canticum pro pace, H.392 (1675–76)
- Canticum in nativitatem, H.393 (1675–76)
- In honorem Caelia, Valeriani et Tiburtij canticum, H.394 (1676)
- Pour la fête de l'Epiphanie, H.395 (1677)
- Historia Esther, H.396 (1677)
- Caecilia virgo et martyr octo vocibus, H.397 (1683–85)
- Pestis Mediolanensis, H.398 (1679)
- Prélude pour Horrenda pestis, H.398 a (1680–83)
- Filius prodigus, H.399 (1680)
- Prélude pour l'Enfant prodigue, H.399 a (1680–83)
- Canticum in honorem Beatae Virginis Mariae inter homines et angelos... H.400 (1680)
- Extremum Dei judicium, H.401 (Jugement dernier) (1680)
- Sacrificium Abrahae, H.402 (1681–83/92)
- Symphonies ajustées au sacrifice d'Abraham, H.402 a (1680–83)
- Mors Saülis et Jonathae, H.403 (1681–82)
- Josue, H.404 (1681–82)
- Prélude, H.404 a (fin 1680–83)
- In resurrectione Domini Nostri Jesu Christi, H.405 (1682)
- In circumcisione Domini / Dialogus inter angelum et pastores, H.406 (fin 1683)
- Dialogus inter esurientem et Christum, H.407 (1682–83)
- Elévation, H.408 (fin 1683)
- In obitum augustissimae nec non piissimae Gallorum regina lamentum, H.409 (1683)
- Praelium Michaelis Archangeli factum in coelo cum dracone, H.410 (fin 1683)
- Caedes sanctorum innocentium, H.411 (1683–84)
- Nuptiae sacrae, H.412 (1684)
- Caecilia virgo et martyr, H.413 (1684)
- In nativitatem Domini Nostri Jesu Christi canticum, H.414 (1684)
- Caecilia virgo et martyr, H.415 (1685)
- Prologue de la Ste Cécile, H.415 a (1686)
- In nativitatem Domini canticum, H.416 (1690)
- Dialogus inter Christum et homines, H.417 (1692)
- In honorem Sancti Ludovici regis Galliae, H.418 (1692–93)
- Pour St Augustin mourant, H.419 (1687)
- Dialogus inter angelos et pastores Judeae, H.420 (1687)
- In nativitatem Domini Nostri Jesu Christi canticum, H.421 (1698)
- Judicium Salomonis, H.422 (1702)
- Dialogus inter Magdalena et Jesum 2 vocibus Canto et Alto cum organo, H.423 (?)
- Le Reniement de St Pierre, H.424 (?)
- Dialogus inter Christum et peccatores, H.425 (?)
- Prélude pour Mementote peccatores, H.425 a (1685–86)

=== Miscellaneous motets (14) ===
- "Quae est ista", H.426
- Pie Jesu, H.427
- (no name), H.428, H.429, H.430
- Gratitudinis erga Deum canticum, H.431
- Offertoire pour le sacre d'un évêque à 4 parties de voix et d'instruments, H 432
- Domine non secundum pour une basse taille avec 2 violons, H.433
- Motet pour une longue offrande / Motet pour l'offertoire de la Messe Rouge, H.434
- (no name), H.435, H.436, H.437, H.438
- Bone Pastor, H.439

=== Secular vocal works ===
==== Airs sérieux et à boire ====
- "A ta haute valeur", H.440
- "Ah! laissez moi rêver", H.441
- "Ah! qu'ils sont courts les beaux jours", H.442
- "Ah! qu'on est malheureux d'avoir eu des désirs", H.443
- "Au bord d'une fontaine", H.443 bis
- "Allons sous ce vert feuillage", H.444
- "Amour vous avez beau redoubler mes alarmes", H.445
- "Auprès du feu l'on fait l'amour", H.446
- "Ayant bu du vin clairet", H.447
- "Beaux petits yeux d'écarlate", H.448
- "Brillantes fleurs naissez", H.449 (Jean de La Fontaine)
- "Feuillages verts naissez", H.449 a
- "Charmantes fleurs naissez", H.449 b
- "Printemps, vous renaissez", H.449 c
- "Aimables fleurs naissez", H.449 d
- "Climène sur ses bords", H.449 e
- "Celle qui fait tout mon tourment", H.450
- "Consolez vous, chers enfants de Bacchus", H.451
- "En vain rivaux assidus", H.452
- "Faites trêve à vos chansonnettes", H.453
- "Fenchon, la gentille Fenchon", H.454
- "Il faut aimer, c'est un mal nécessaire", H.454 bis
- "Non, non je ne l'aime plus", H.455
- "Oiseaux de ces bocages", H.456
- 457–459 Airs sur les stances du Cid, (Pierre Corneille):
  - "Percé jusqu'au fond du coeur", H.457
  - "Père, maitresse, honneur, amour", H.458
  - "Que je sens de rudes combats", H.459
- "Que Louis par sa vaillance", H.459 bis
- "Qu'il est doux, charmante Climène", H.460
- "Deux beaux yeux un teint de jaunisse", H.460 a
- "Le beau jour dit une bergère", H.460 b
- "Un flambeau, Jeannette, Isabelle", H.460 c (Emile Blamont)
- "Quoi je ne verrai plus", H.461
- "Quoi rien ne peut vous arrêter?", H.462
- "Rendez moi mes plaisirs", H.463
- "Rentrez, trop indiscrets soupirs", H.464
- "Retirons nous, fuyons", H.465
- "Ruisseau qui nourrit dans ce bois", H.466
- "Sans frayeur dans ce bois", H.467
- "Tout renait, tout fleurit", H.468
- "Tristes déserts, sombre retraite", H.469
- "Veux tu, compère Grégoire", H.470
- "Si Claudine ma voisine", H.499 b
- Airs italiens et français, (lost)

==== Cantatas (Italian, French and Latin) ====
- Orphée descendant aux enfers, H.471
- Serenata a tre voci e sinfonia, H.472
- Epithalamio in lode dell'Altezza serenissima Elettorale di Massimiliano Emanuel Duca di Baviera concento a cinque voci con stromenti, H.473
- Epitaphium Carpentarii, H.474
- Beate mie pene / Duo à doi canti del Signor Charpentier, H.475
- "Superbo amore", H.476
- "Il mondo cosi va", H.477
- Cantate française de M. Charpentier, H.478
- Le roi d'Assyrie mourant, (lost)

== Theatrical works ==
=== Pastorales, divertissements and operas ===
- Petite pastorale, H.479 (= Jugement de Pan)
- Les Plaisirs de Versailles, H.480
- Actéon, Pastorale en musique, H.481
- Actéon changé en biche, H.481 a
- Sur la naissance de Notre Seigneur Jésus Christ: Pastorale, H.482
- Pastorale sur la naissance de notre Seigneur Jésus Christ, H.483
- Seconde partie du noël français qui commence par "que nos soupirs", H.483 a
- Seconde partie du noël français qui commence par "que nos soupirs, Seigneur", H.483 b
- Il faut rire et chanter: dispute de bergers, H.484
- La Fête de Rueil, H.485
- La Fête de Rueil, H.485 a
- La Couronne de fleurs, Pastorale, H.486 (1685)
- Les Arts florissants, Opéra, H.487
- Les Arts florissants, H.487 a
- La Descente d'Orphée aux enfers, H.488
- Idyle sur le retour de la santé du Roi, H.489
- Celse Martyr, tragédie en musique ( P. Bretonneau), (lost)
- David et Jonathas, H.490 (P. Bretonneau)
- Ouverture de Mr Charpentier, H.490 a
- Médée, H.491 (Thomas Corneille)
  - Parodie de deux airs de Médée, H.491 a
  - Parodie de deux airs de Médée, H.491 b
  - Parodie de deux airs de Médée, H.491 c
- 492–493 Pastorelette del Sgr M. Ant. Charpentier
  - Amor vince ogni cosa / Pastoraletta 1a del Sigr Charpentier, H.492
  - Pastoraletta italiana IIa del Sigr Charpentier, H.493
- Philomèle, (lost, composed in collaboration with Monseigneur le Duc d'Orléans, Duc de Chartres)
- Jugement de Pan, (= Petite pastorale H.479)
- Le Retour du Printemps, (lost)
- Artaxerse, (lost)
- La Dori e Orente, (lost)
- Les Amours d'Acis et Galatée (lost) (Jean de La Fontaine)

=== Intermèdes and incidental music ===
- Psyché, (Pierre Corneille, Molière, Quinault) 1684 (lost)
- Le médecin malgré lui, (Molière) (→ H.460, 460 a, 460 b, 460 c)
- Les fâcheux, (Molière) (lost)
- Le Dépit amoureux, Ouverture (Molière) 1679 (lost)
- La Contesse d'Escarbagnas (Molière) H.494i
- Le Mariage forcé, H.494 (Molière) H.494ii
- Le malade imaginaire, première version, H.495 (Molière)
- Le malade imaginaire, seconde version, H.495 a
- Le malade imaginaire, troisième version, H.495 b
- Profitez du printemps, H.495 c
- Circé, H.496 (Thomas Corneille & Donneau de Visé) (1675)
  - Parodie de 2 airs de Circé, H.496 a
  - Parodie de 8 airs de Circé, H.496 b
  - Parodie de 8 airs de Circé, H.496 c
- L'inconnu (Donneau de Visé & Thomas Corneille), (lost) (1675)
- Le triomphe des dames (Thomas Corneille), (lost) (1676)
- Sérénade pour le sicilien, H.497 (Molière)
- Ouverture du prologue de Polieucte (Pierre Corneille) = Le Dépit amoureux H.498 (Molière)
- L'Inconnu, H.499 (Donneau de Visé)
- Acis et Galatée, (H.499) (Jean de La Fontaine) (incomplete) (lost)
- Le Bavolet, H.499 a
- Les Fous divertissants, H.500 (Raymond Poisson)
- La Pierre philosophale, H.501 (Thomas Corneille & Donneau de Visé) (1681)
- Endimion, H.502
- Air pour des paysans dans la Noce de village au lieu de l'air du marié, H.503 (Brécourt)
- Andromède, H.504 (Pierre Corneille) (1682)
- Le rendez vous des Tuileries, H.505 (Baron)
- Dialogue d'Angélique et de Médor, H.506 (Dancourt)
- Vénus et Adonis, H.507 (Donneau de Visé)
- Apothéose de Laodamus à la mémoire de M. le Maréchal duc de Luxembourg, (P. de Longuemare) (lost)

== Instrumental works ==
=== Sacred (32) ===
- Symphonies pour un reposoir, H.508
- Symphonie devant Regina coeli, H.509
- (untitled) (préludes ?), H.510, H.512
- Prélude pour O filii et filiae, H.511
- Messe pour plusieurs instruments au lieu des orgues, H.513
- Offerte pour l'orgue et pour les violons, flûtes et hautbois, H.514
- Symphonies pour un reposoir, H.515
- Après Confitebor: antienne en D la re sol bécarre, H.516
- Après Beati omnes: antienne en G re sol bécarre, H.517
- Pour le sacre d'un évêque, H.518
- Symphonies pour le Jugement de Salomon, H.519
- Prélude, menuet et passe-pied pour les flûtes et hautbois devant l'ouverture, H.520
- Prélude pour ce que l'on voudra non encore employé, H.521
- Offerte non encore exécutée, H.522
- Pour un reposoir: Ouverture dès que la procession parait, H.523
- Ouverture pour l'église, H.524
- Antienne, H.525
- Antienne, H.526
- Prélude pour Sub tuum praesidium à trois violons, H.527
- Prélude en G re sol bemol à 4 pour les violons et flûtes, H.528
- Symphonie en G re sol bemol à 3 flûtes ou violons, H.529
- Prélude en C sol ut bécarre à quatre parties de violons avec flûtes, H.530
- Noël pour les instruments, H.531
- Antienne pour les violons, flûtes et hautbois à quatre parties, H.532
- Prélude pour le second Magnificat à 4 voix sans instruments en D la re bécarre, H.533
- Noël sur les instruments, H.534
- Prélude pour le Domine salvum en F ut fa à 4 voix, H.535
- Ouverture pour le sacre d'un évêque, H.536
- Ouverture pour le sacre d'un évêque pour les violons, flûtes et hautbois, H.537
- Prélude pour..., H.538
- Prélude pour le second Dixit Dominus à 4 voix sans instruments en F ut fa, H.539

=== Secular ===
- Ouverture pour quelque belle entreprise à cinq, H.540
- Deux menuets, H.541
- Caprice pour trois violons, H.542
- Pièces de viole, H.543
- (untitled) H.544
- Concert pour quatre parties de violes, H.545
- Commencement d'ouverture pour ce que l'on voudra, en la rectifiant un peu, H.546
- Deux airs de trompette, H.547
- Sonate pour 2 flûtes allemandes, 2 dessus de violon, une basse de viole, une basse de violon à 5 cordes, un clavecin et un théorbe, H.548
- Trio de Mr Charpentier, H.548 bis
- Menuet de Mr Charpentier & Menuet en suite, H.548 ter
- Menuet de Strasbourg, H.549 bis
- Symphonies... de Charpentier... (Collection Philidor vol. XXV), (lost)
