= Veneration of Mary in the Catholic Church =

Blessed Ever-Virgin Mary
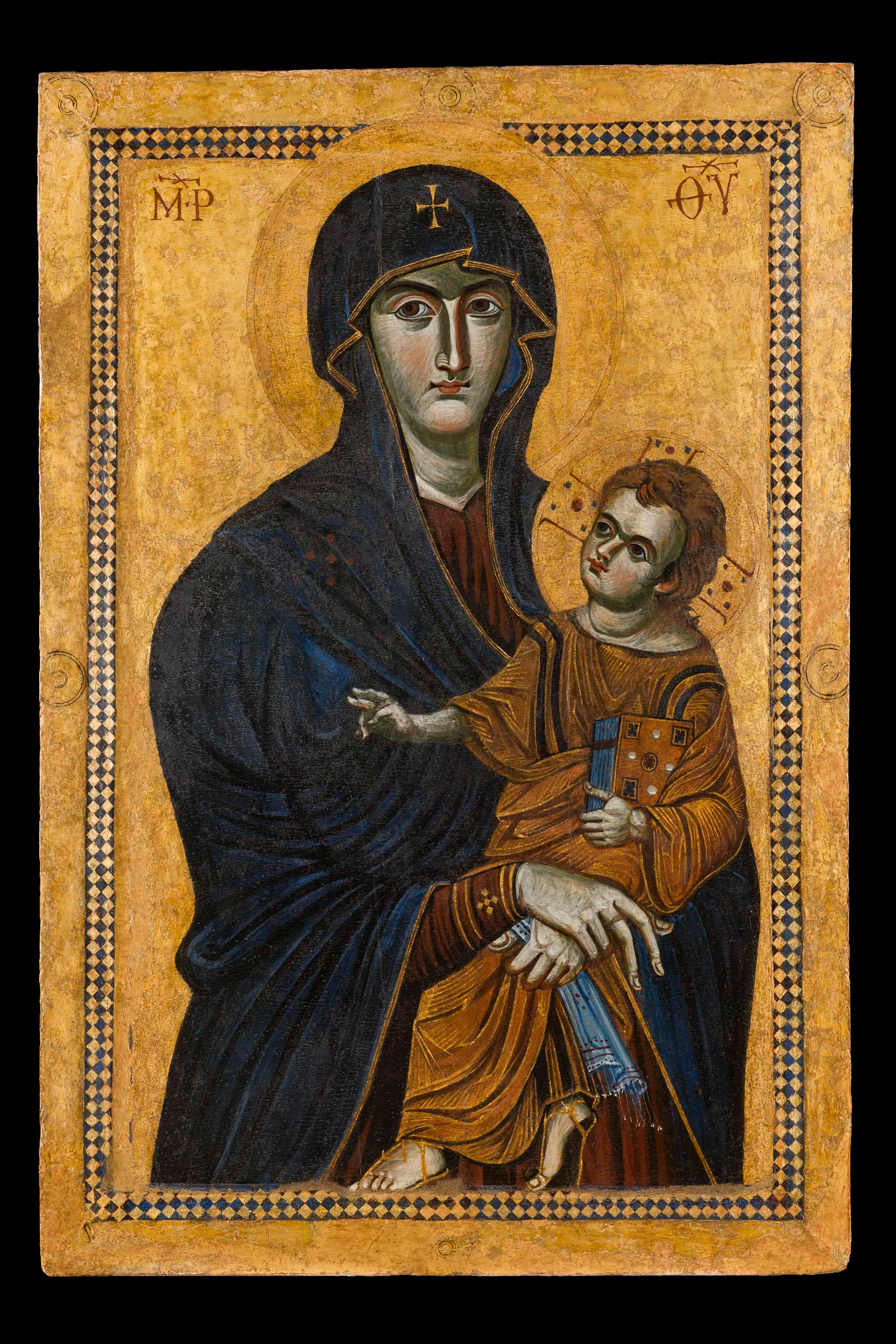
- A restored icon of Salus Populi Romani

Mother of God Queen of Heaven Mother of the Church Our Lady
- Born: September 8 (Nativity of Mary)
- Died: The Catholic Church teaches that, at the end of her natural life, she was assumed into heaven, body and soul (Assumption of Mary)
- Venerated in: Catholic Church
- Canonized: Pre-Congregation
- Major shrine: Santa Maria Maggiore, others (see Shrines to the Virgin Mary)
- Feast: See Marian feast days
- Attributes: Blue mantle, white veil, Immaculate heart, crown of 12 stars, pregnant woman, halo with 12 stars, roses, woman with child
- Patronage: See Patronage of the Blessed Virgin Mary

The veneration of Mary in the Catholic Church encompasses various devotions which include prayer, pious acts, visual arts, poetry, and music devoted to her. Popes have encouraged it, while also taking steps to reform some manifestations of it. (Note: For example, on March 12, 1969, Pope Paul VI reduced and rearranged the number of Marian feast days in Sanctitas clarior. Several of his predecessors did similarly.) The Holy See has insisted on the importance of distinguishing "true from false devotion, and authentic doctrine from its deformations by excess or defect". There are significantly more titles, feasts, and venerative Marian practices among Catholics than in other Western Christian traditions. The term hyperdulia indicates the special veneration due to Mary, greater than the ordinary dulia for other saints, but utterly unlike the latria due only to God.

Belief in the incarnation of God the Son through Mary is the basis for calling her the Mother of God, which was declared a dogma at the Council of Ephesus in 431. At the Second Vatican Council and in Pope John Paul II's encyclical Redemptoris mater, she is spoken of also as Mother of the Church.

Growth of Catholic veneration of Mary and Mariology has often come not from official declarations, but from Marian writings of the saints, popular devotion, and at times reported Marian apparitions. The Holy See approves only a select few as worthy of belief, the most recent being the 2008 approval of certain apparitions from 1665.

Further pious veneration of Mary encouraged by Popes are exhibited in the canonical coronations granted to popular Marian images venerated in a particular locality all over the world, while Marian movements and societies with millions of members have arisen from belief in events such as Guadalupe, Lourdes, Fátima, Akita, and other reasons.

== From Christ to Mary in the Catholic tradition ==
In Catholic teachings, the veneration of Mary is a natural consequence of Christology: Jesus and Mary are son and mother, redeemer and redeemed. This sentiment was expressed by Pope John Paul II in his encyclical Redemptoris mater: "At the centre of this mystery, in the midst of this wonderment of faith, stands Mary. As the loving Mother of the Redeemer, she was the first to experience it: 'To the wonderment of nature you bore your Creator'!"

In the Catholic tradition Mariology is seen as Christology developed to its full potential. Mary is seen as contributing to a fuller understanding of the life of Jesus. In this view, a Christology without Mary is not based on the total revelation of the Bible. Traces of this parallel interpretation go back to the early days of Christianity and numerous saints have since focused on it.

The development of this approach continued into the 20th century. In his 1946 publication Compendium Mariologiae, Gabriel Roschini, a Mariologist, explained that Mary not only participated in the birth of the physical Jesus, but, with conception, she entered with him into a spiritual union. The divine salvation plan, being not only material, includes a permanent spiritual unity with Christ. Joseph Cardinal Ratzinger (later Pope Benedict XVI) wrote: "It is necessary to go back to Mary if we want to return to that 'truth about Jesus Christ,' 'truth about the Church' and 'truth about man' that John Paul II proposed as a program to all of Christianity," in order to ensure an authentic approach to Christology via a return to the "whole truth about Mary".

== From veneration to theology ==
It is possible that the practice of invoking the aid of the Mother of Christ had become more familiar to the faithful some time before any expression of it in the writings of the Early Church Fathers. Christians' love for Mary intuited, frequently in anticipation, certain aspects of the mystery of the Blessed Virgin, calling the attention of theologians and pastors to them. Venerative and devotional practices have often preceded formal theological declarations by the Magisterium.

The veneration of the Blessed Virgin takes place in various ways. Marian prayers and hymns usually begin with veneration (honor) of her, followed by petitions. The number of Marian titles continued to grow as of the 3rd century, and many titles existed by the 5th century, growing especially during the Middle Ages.

=== Theological basis for the veneration of Mary ===
Veneration for Mary is based on the reference in the Gospel of Luke to Mary as the selected handmaid of the Lord who is greeted and praised by both Elizabeth and the angel Gabriel. God's work is further illuminated in the Marian dogmas of the Catholic Church such as the Immaculate Conception and the Assumption, and are, in the Catholic view, part of the apostolic tradition and divine revelation. Catholics distinguish veneration from worship.

=== Mary's role in salvation and redemption ===
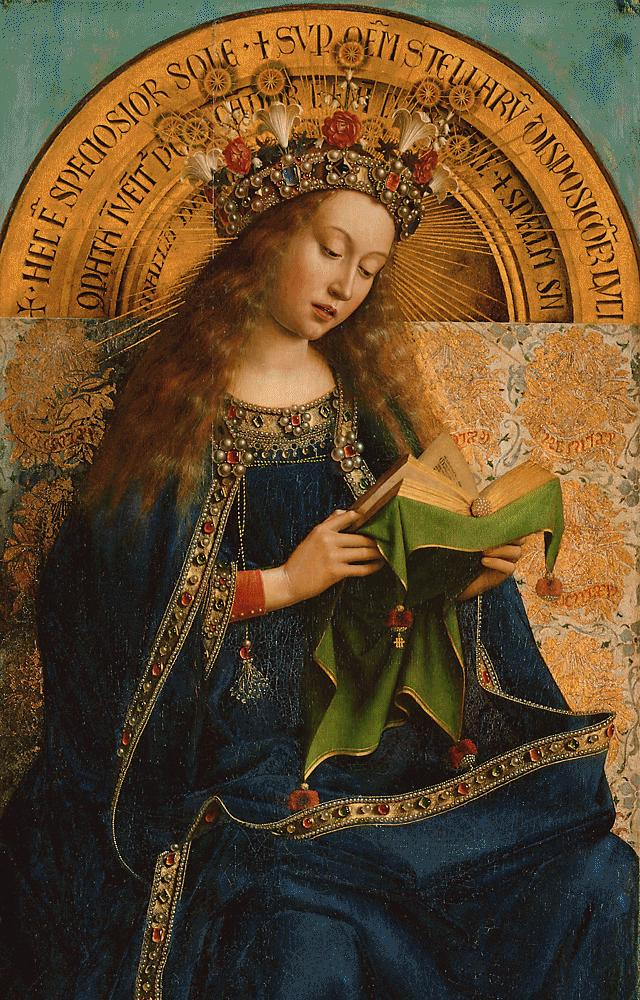
The Virgin Mary from the Ghent Altarpiece, 1432

One of the components of the Catholic veneration of Mary is the focus on her participation in the processes of salvation and redemption. This has been explored by such writers as Edward Schillebeeckx and Adrienne von Speyr.

John's Gospel records her presence at the beginning and end of Jesus' public life. Particularly significant is Mary's presence at the Cross, when she received from her dying Son the charge to be mother to the beloved disciple. Catholics interpret that through the disciple, Christ is giving care of Mary to all Christians. The Acts of the Apostles expressly numbers the Mother of Jesus among the women of the first community awaiting Pentecost. John Eudes wrote that: "The Virgin Mary began to cooperate in the plan of salvation, from the moment she gave her consent to the Incarnation of the Son of God".

Lumen gentium, the 1964 Dogmatic Constitution of the Church recognized, "all the salvific influence of the Blessed Virgin on men originates, not from some inner necessity, but from the divine pleasure. It flows forth from the superabundance of the merits of Christ, rests on His mediation, depends entirely on it and draws all its power from it." In a singular way she cooperated by her obedience, faith, hope, and burning charity in the work of the Savior in giving back supernatural life to souls. "Wherefore she is our mother in the order of grace."

One of the first scholars to offer theological foundations on the subject of the Immaculate Conception was the Franciscan Duns Scotus who developed the concept that Mary was preserved from sin by the redemptive virtue of Jesus. Devotions to and the veneration of the Virgin Mary continued to spread, as she came to be seen as the helpful mother of Christians, and by the 15th century these practices had oriented many Catholic devotions.

Veronica Giuliani expressed how Mary's suffering in Calvary united her heart with that of Jesus as she suffered each torment along with him. The joint devotion to the hearts was formalized by Jean Eudes who organized the scriptural and theological foundations and developed its liturgical themes. The venerative aspects of the united nature of the two hearts continued through the centuries and in 1985 Pope John Paul II coined the term Alliance of the Hearts of Jesus and Mary, and in 1986 addressed the international conference on that topic held at Fátima, Portugal.

By the 18th century, the continued growth of Marian veneration had emphasized the role of the Virgin Mary in salvation. The Catholic focus on the role of Mary in salvation and redemption continued with Pope John Paul II's 1987 encyclical Redemptoris mater.

=== Mary as the masterwork of God ===
The Catechism of the Catholic Church, in paragraphs 721–726, claims that Mary is the first dwelling-place of God in salvation history. As such, she is the masterwork of God and the start of God bringing mankind into communion with Jesus. In Mary's womb, Jesus is the manifestation of God's wonders, the fulfillment of God's plan of loving goodness, and the definitive theophany. As such, Mary is typified by the Burning Bush in the Book of Exodus and by wisdom in the Book of Proverbs.

=== Mary as protectress and intercessor ===
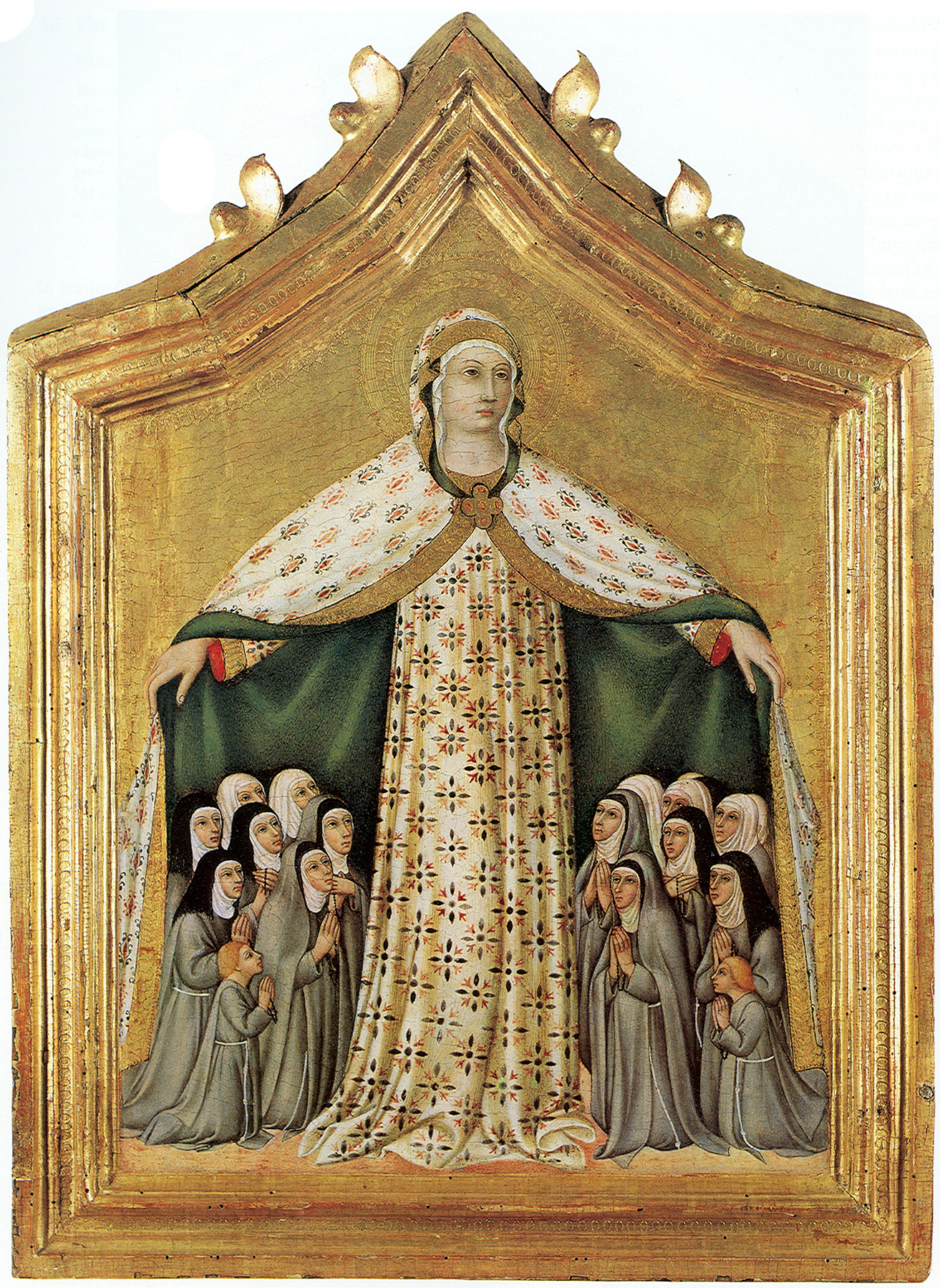
The Virgin of Mercy protecting a group of nuns under her mantle. Sano di Pietro, 15th century.

It was through Mary's intercession, through compassion for the hosts, at the marriage feast of Cana, that Jesus worked his first miracle.

The Catechism of the Catholic Church states: "From the most ancient times the Blessed Virgin has been honored with the title of 'Mother of God,' to whose protection the faithful fly in all their dangers and needs." The Eastern Catholic Churches observe the feast of the Intercession of the Theotokos in October.

Catholic views of the Virgin Mary as refuge and advocate of sinners, protector from dangers and powerful intercessor with her Son, Jesus are expressed in prayers, artistic depictions, theology, and popular and devotional writings, as well as in the use of religious articles and images. The earliest known prayer to Mary, the Sub tuum praesidium, ("Under your protection") dates from about the 3rd century, with more recent scholarship dating it from the 6th to 9th century C.E. The artistic depictions of the Virgin of Mercy portray the role of Mary as the protector of Christians, as she shelters them under her mantle. The Virgin of Mercy depictions sometimes include arrows raining from above, with the Virgin's cloak protecting the people.

Catholics have continued to seek the protection of Mary as the Mother of Sorrows and relied on her intercession as the Queen of Heaven since the Middle Ages. Building on that sentiment, popes have entrusted specific causes to the protection of the Virgin Mary. Pope Benedict XV entrusted the protection of the world through the intercession of Mary Queen of Peace during the First World War.

The Order of the Blessed Virgin Mary of Mercy, also known as the order of Our Lady of Ransom or Order of Captives began in the 13th century in the Kingdom of Aragon (Spain) to ransom captive Christians (slaves) held in Muslim hands. The order now focuses on the role of the Virgin Mary as the protector of captives and prisoners.

The depictions of Our Lady of Navigators arose from the prayers and devotions of Portuguese navigators, who saw the Virgin Mary as their protector during storms and other hazards. Prayers to Our Lady of Navigators are well known in South America, specially Brazil, where its February 2 feast is an official holiday. The Virgin of the Navigators, depicting ships under her mantle, is the earliest known painting whose subject is the discovery of the Americas.

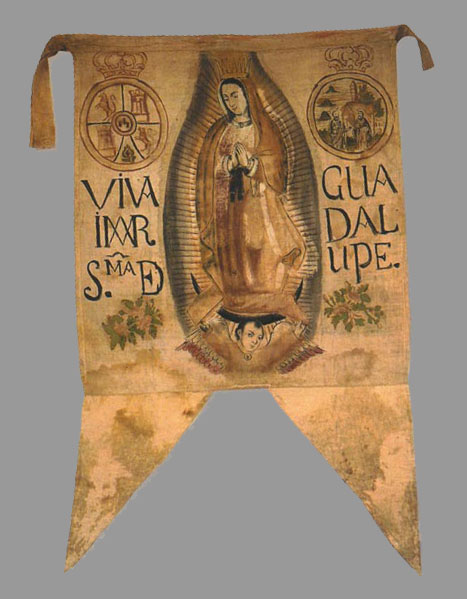
Miguel Hidalgo's 1810 Guadalupan flag

Both Miguel Hidalgo and Emiliano Zapata flew flags of Our Lady of Guadalupe as their protector, and Zapata's men wore the Guadalupan image around their necks and on their sombreros. In 1979 ceremony Pope John Paul II placed Mexico under the protection of the Virgin of Guadalupe.

The prayer, the Memorare begins: "Remember O most gracious Virgin Mary, that never was it known that anyone who fled to Thy protection, implored Thy help or sought Thy intercession, was left unaided."

Louis de Montfort taught that God appointed Mary as "the dispenser of grace", and to receive grace from God, one can receive it through the hands of the Blessed Virgin, as a child receives from a mother. Lumen gentium states: "This, however, is to be so understood that it neither takes away from nor adds anything to the dignity and efficaciousness of Christ the one Mediator."

Pope Francis has said that her "entire life was contained in her song of praise" of the greatness of the Lord. Francis goes on to confide that at Marian shrines he likes to

spend time looking at the Blessed Mother and letting her look at me. I pray for a childlike trust, the trust of the poor and simple who know that their mother is there, and that they have a place in her heart. And in looking at her, to hear once more, like the Indian Juan Diego: "My youngest son, what is the matter? Do not let it disturb your heart. Am I not here, I who have the honour to be your mother?"

=== Development of Marian doctrines ===
The theological development of devotion to Mary begins with Justin Martyr (100–165) who articulated Mary's role in salvation history as the Second Eve. This was followed up by Irenæus, whom Herbert Thurston calls "the first theologian of the Virgin Mother".

The Catholic Church's magisterium has identified four teachings about Mary as dogmas of faith. These include belief in her virginal conception of Jesus, taught by the First Council of Nicaea in 325. The Council of Ephesus in 431 applied to her the description "Mother of God", (Theotokos). The perpetual virginity of Mary was taught by the ecumenical Second Council of Constantinople in 553, which described her as "ever virgin", and was expressed also, by the Lateran synod of October 649, The doctrine of the Immaculate Conception states that from the first moment of her existence Mary was without original sin. This doctrine was proclaimed a dogma ex cathedra by Pope Pius IX in 1854. The dogma of the Assumption of Mary, defined by Pope Pius XII in 1950, states that, at the end of her earthly life, her body did not suffer corruption but was assumed into heaven and became a heavenly body.

=== Liturgical aspects ===
In the first three centuries the emphasis was on the veneration of martyrs, as a continuation of the yearly celebrations of their death, e.g. as noted in the early Christian text on the Martyrdom of Polycarp.

In the Eastern traditions Mariology developed through liturgical veneration within the framework of the feasts relative to the Incarnation. In the early part of the 3rd century, Hippolytus of Rome recorded the first liturgical reference to the Virgin Mary, as part of the ordination rite of a bishop. Marian feasts appeared in the 4th century, and the feast of the "Memory of Mary, Mother of God" was celebrated on August 15 in Jerusalem by the year 350.

Catholic liturgy is one of the most important elements of Marian devotions. Many Marian feasts are superior to the feast days of the other saints. The liturgical texts of the Marian feast days all link Mary to Jesus Christ.

== History ==
=== Early veneration ===
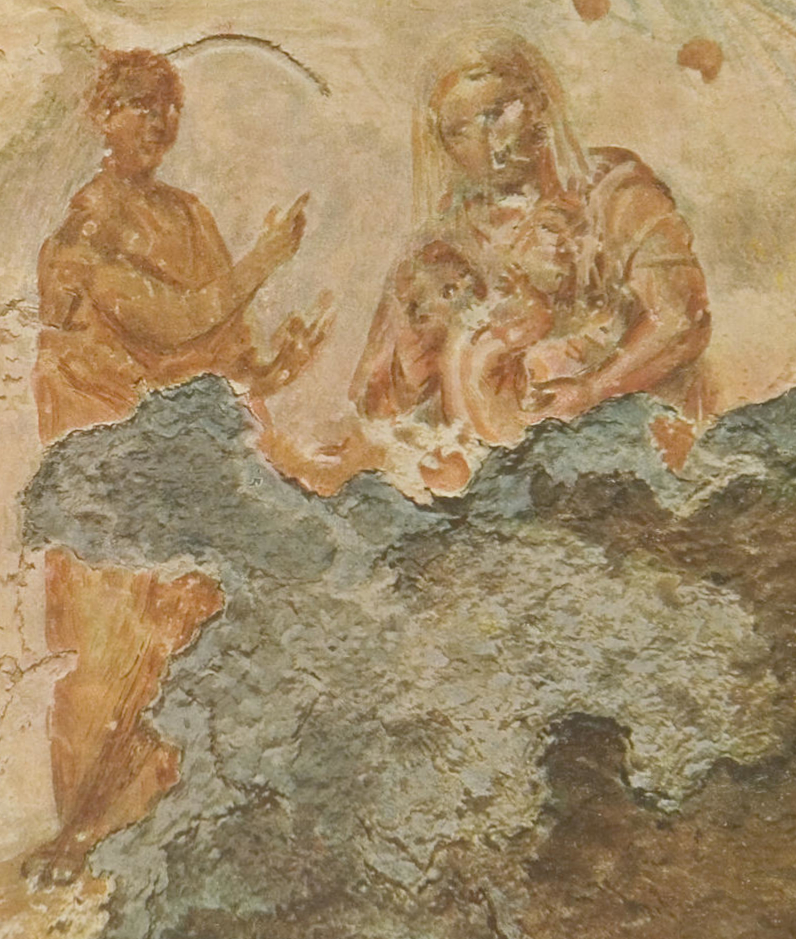
Earliest fresco of the Virgin Mary, Catacomb of Priscilla, 2nd century

Mary, as the mother of Jesus, is documented in Roman catacombs: paintings from the first half of the 2nd century show her holding the Christ Child. Excavations in the crypt of St Peter's Basilica uncovered a very early fresco of Mary together with Saint Peter. The Roman Priscilla catacombs depict the oldest Marian paintings from the middle of the 2nd century: Mary is shown with Jesus on her lap; they are next to a man in a tunic, his left hand holding a book and his right hand pointing to a star over his head, the latter being an Old Testament symbol of messiahs and/or the Messiah. These catacombs also have a depiction of the Annunciation. The Edict of Milan (AD 313) allowed Christians to worship openly. This new freedom also permitted literary development of the veneration of Mary, Hippolytus of Rome being an early example. Ambrose, who lived in Rome before going to Milan as its bishop, venerated Mary as an example of Christian life and is credited with starting a Marian cult of virginity in the 4th century.

Marian veneration was theologically sanctioned with the adoption of the title Theotokos (Mother of God) at the Council of Ephesus in 431. The earliest known churches dedicated to Mary were built shortly after that date, among these the Church of the Seat of Mary (Kathisma) near Mar Elias Monastery, between Jerusalem and Bethlehem. The first Marian churches in Rome date from the 5th and 6th centuries: Santa Maria in Trastevere, Santa Maria Antiqua and Santa Maria Maggiore. However, the very earliest church dedicated to the Virgin Mary still dates to the late 4th century in Syria, where an inscription dedicating it to the Theotokos was found among the ruins.

=== Growth of Marian culture ===
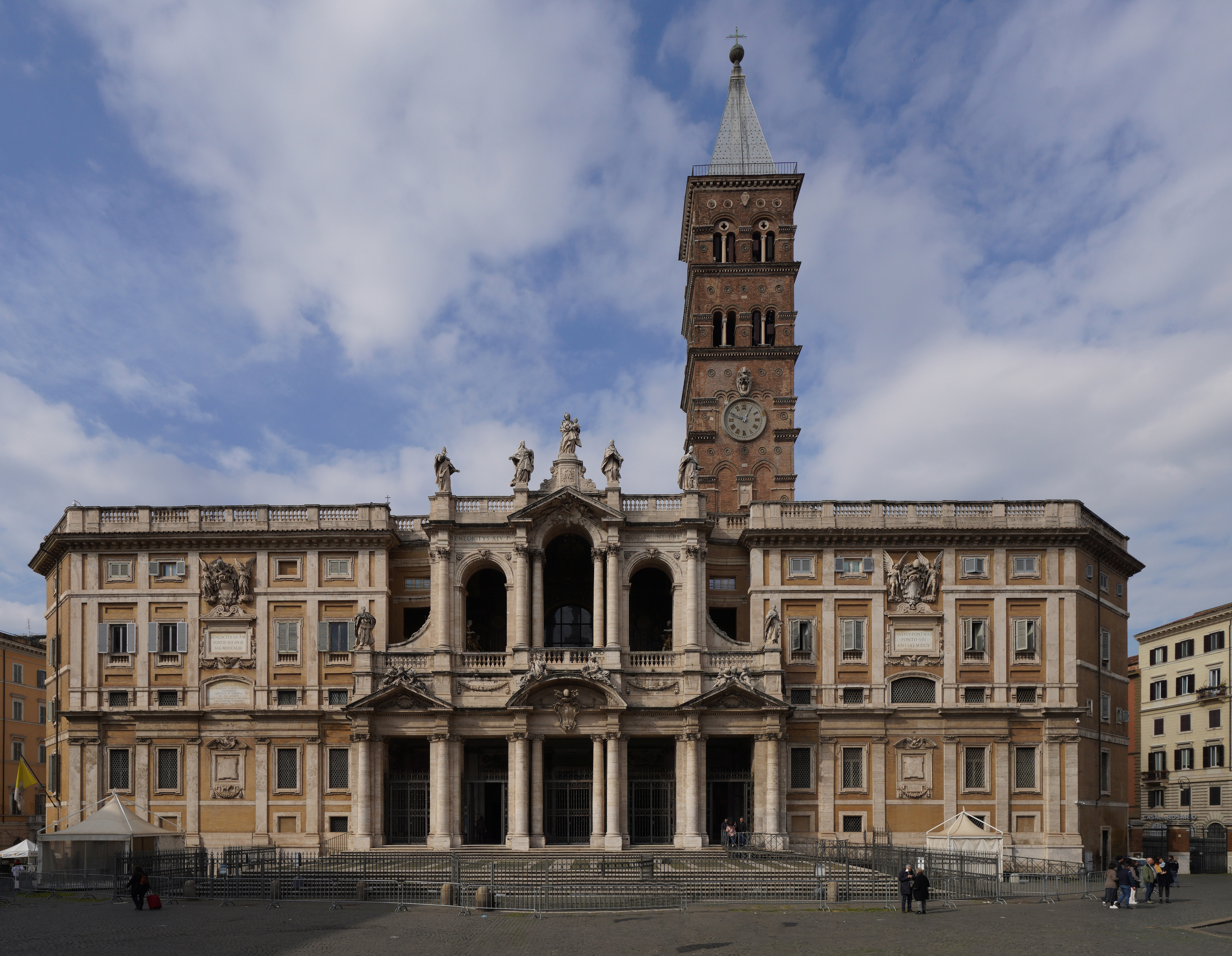
Santa Maria Maggiore, the first Marian church in Rome, originally built between 430 and 440

In the early Middle Ages, veneration of Mary was particularly expressed in monasteries, especially those of the Benedictines. Chants such as Ave Maris Stella and the Salve Regina emerged and became staples of monastic plainsong. In the 8th century, The Little Office of the Blessed Virgin Mary developed from the monks' practice of praying the canonical hours. The Carolingians encouraged Marian piety by the celebration of Marian feast days and the dedication of churches in her honor. Devotional practices grew in number.

The Romanesque period saw the construction of major Marian churches, such as Speyer Cathedral (also known as the Mariendom) in Speyer, Germany, and Our Lady of Flanders Cathedral in Tournai, Belgium. From the year 1000 onward more and more churches, including many of Europe's greatest cathedrals were dedicated to Mary. Gothic cathedrals, such as Notre Dame de Paris as well as Our Lady of Chartres near Paris, were major masterworks of the time. Construction of Santa Maria Assunta Cathedral in Siena, Italy and Notre-Dame Cathedral, Luxembourg increased the number of churches devoted to the Virgin Mary.

The 12th and 13th centuries saw an extraordinary growth of the cult of the Virgin in Western Europe, inspired in part by the writings of theologians such as Bernard of Clairvaux. The movement found its grandest expression in the French cathedrals, often dedicated to "Our Lady", such as Notre-Dame de Paris and Notre-Dame de Bayeux among others. Walsingham and other places of Marian pilgrimage developed large popular followings. At the height of the pilgrimage movement in the 11th and 12th centuries, hundreds of people were traveling almost constantly from one Marian shrine to the next.

By the 14th century, Mary had become greatly popular as a compassionate intercessor and protector of humanity, and during the great plagues (such as the Black Death) her help was sought against the just judgment of God. The Renaissance witnessed a dramatic growth in venerative Marian art.

By the 16th century, the Protestant Reformation had introduced a tide against Marian venerations in Europe. However, at the same time new Marian devotions were starting in Latin America based on Juan Diego's 1531 reported vision of Our Lady of Guadalupe. The ensuing Marian pilgrimages have continued to date and the Marian Basilica on Tepeyac Hill remains the most visited Catholic shrine in the world. In the 17th and 18th centuries writings by the saints, coupled with papal encouragements, increased the growth of Marian devotions, and gave rise to the definition and declaration of new Marian doctrines.

Marian culture continues to develop within the Catholic Church. Developments put forward during the Second Vatican Council followed on from a century of increased emphasis on devotion to Mary: the Council's document Sacrosanctum Concilium (1963) sought to give guidance on the place of such devotions in Christian piety, asserting that "Devotions should be so drawn up that they harmonize with the liturgical seasons, accord with the sacred liturgy, are in some fashion derived from it, and lead the people to it, since, in fact, the liturgy by its very nature far surpasses any of them" (SC, 13), while the Decree on the Apostolate of the Laity in 1965 added that the blessed virgin Mary is a "perfect example" of the "type of spiritual and apostolic life" which was envisaged for lay people in the post-conciliar church. It was the view of the Council that all the faithful "should devoutly venerate her and commend their life and apostolate to her maternal care".

In 1974, after four years of preparation, Pope Paul VI issued an Apostolic Letter entitled Marialis Cultus. In this document, (which was subtitled For the Right Ordering and Development of Devotion to the Blessed Virgin Mary) Paul VI not only discussed the history of Marian devotions but also overviewed their rationale and provided suggestions for their future direction, their theological and pastoral value. He called for "preventing any tendency (as has happened at times in certain forms of popular piety) to separate devotion to the Blessed Virgin from its necessary point of reference", i.e. Jesus Christ.

== Catholic saints and veneration of Mary ==
Catholic devotions have relied on the writings of numerous saints throughout history who have attested to the central role of Mary in God's plan of salvation.

Early saints included Irenaeus of Lyons in the 2nd century who was perhaps the earliest of the Church Fathers to write systematically about the Virgin Mary, and he set out a forthright account of her role in the economy of salvation. Ambrose of Milan (339–397) based the veneration of Mary not only on her virginity but also on her extraordinary courage.

In the Middle Ages, Bernhard of Clairvaux highlighted her virginity and humility as the basis for her veneration. A particularly significant contribution to Mariology came from John Duns Scotus who in the 13th century defended the doctrine of the Immaculate Conception. Scotus identified the key theological foundations which led to the declaration of the dogma of Immaculate Conception centuries later.

In the 16th century, Ignatius of Loyola instructed the Jesuits to preserve Madonna della Strada, which was later enshrined in the Church of the Gesu in Rome. Filippo Neri, a contemporary of Ignatius, is credited with the innovation of daily Marian devotions during the month of May.

In his book The Glories of Mary, Alphonsus Liguori explained how God gave Mary to mankind as the "Gate of Heaven", quoting Bonaventure, "No one can enter Heaven unless by Mary, as though through a door." Louis de Montfort's book True Devotion to Mary synthesized many of the writings of earlier saints. His approach of "total consecration to Jesus Christ through Mary" had a strong impact on Marian devotion both in popular piety and in the spirituality of religious institutes.

== Feast days ==
The earliest Christian feasts that relate to Mary grew out of the cycle of feasts that celebrated the Nativity of Jesus. By the 7th century a feast dedicated to Mary was celebrated just before Christmas in the churches of Milan and Ravenna in Italy. Over time, the number of feasts (and the associated titles of Mary) and the venerative practices that accompany them increased and today the Catholic Church has more Marian feasts, titles, and venerative practices than any other Christian body. Marian feasts have continued to be developed in the Catholic Church, e.g. the feast of the Queenship of Mary was declared in the 1954 in the papal encyclical Ad Caeli Reginam by pope Pius XII.

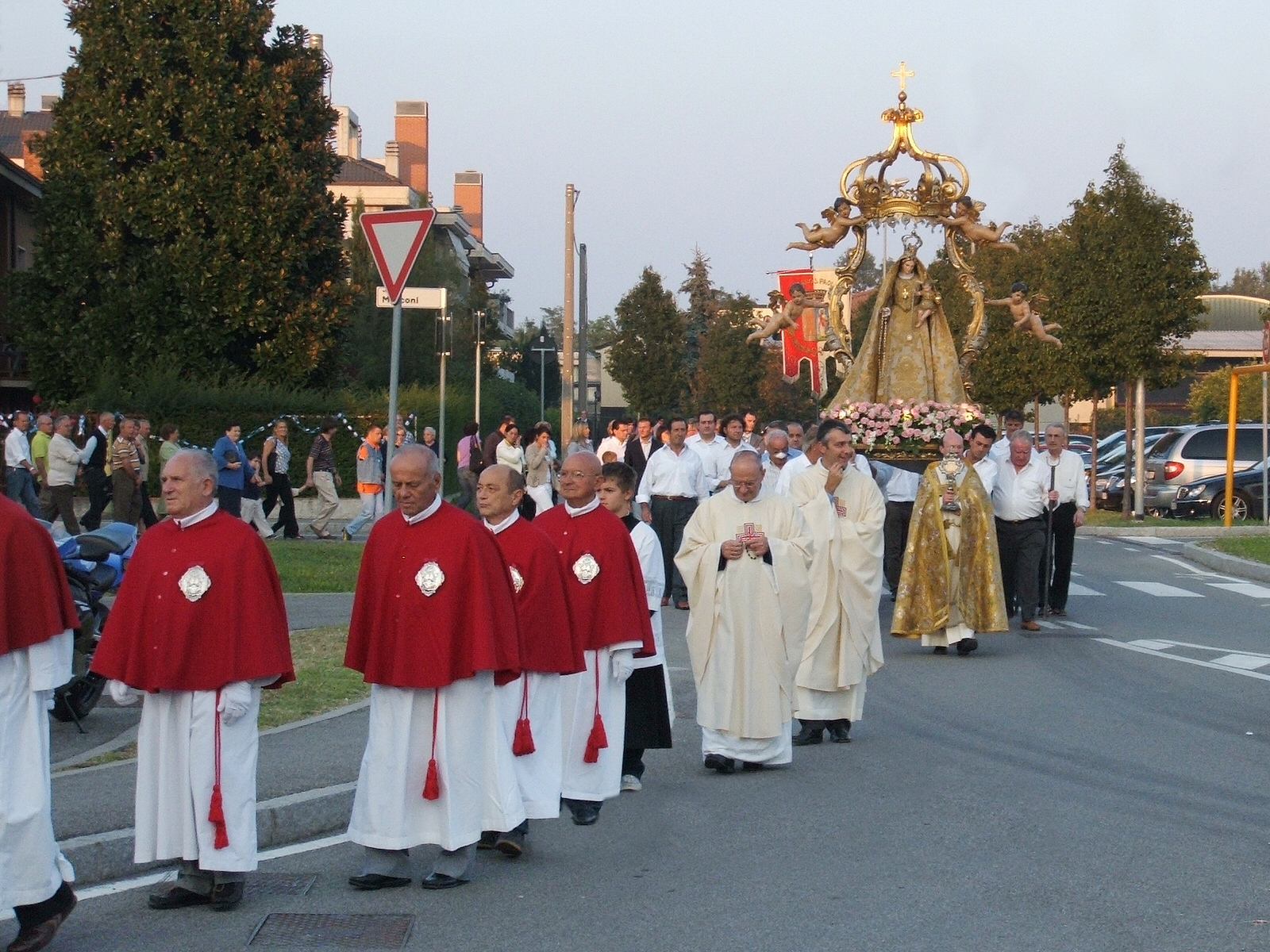
A Feast of Our Lady of the Rosary procession during October in Bergamo, Italy

Catherine of Siena, adopted the custom of dedicating Saturday to Mary. The month of October was established as the "month of the Rosary" by Pope Leo XIII, who recommended daily Rosary devotions in October.

During the month of May, May devotions to the Blessed Virgin Mary take place in many Catholic regions. These may include the singing of Marian anthems, crowning of statues of Mary with floral wreaths, readings from scriptures, a sermon, and or presentation by local choirs. The month is also associated with reflection on the Virgin Mary's role as the ideal disciple who sheds light on the Christian way of life, and theologian Karl Rahner stated: "When we are involved in our May Devotions, we are engaged in a Christian understanding of the human situation."

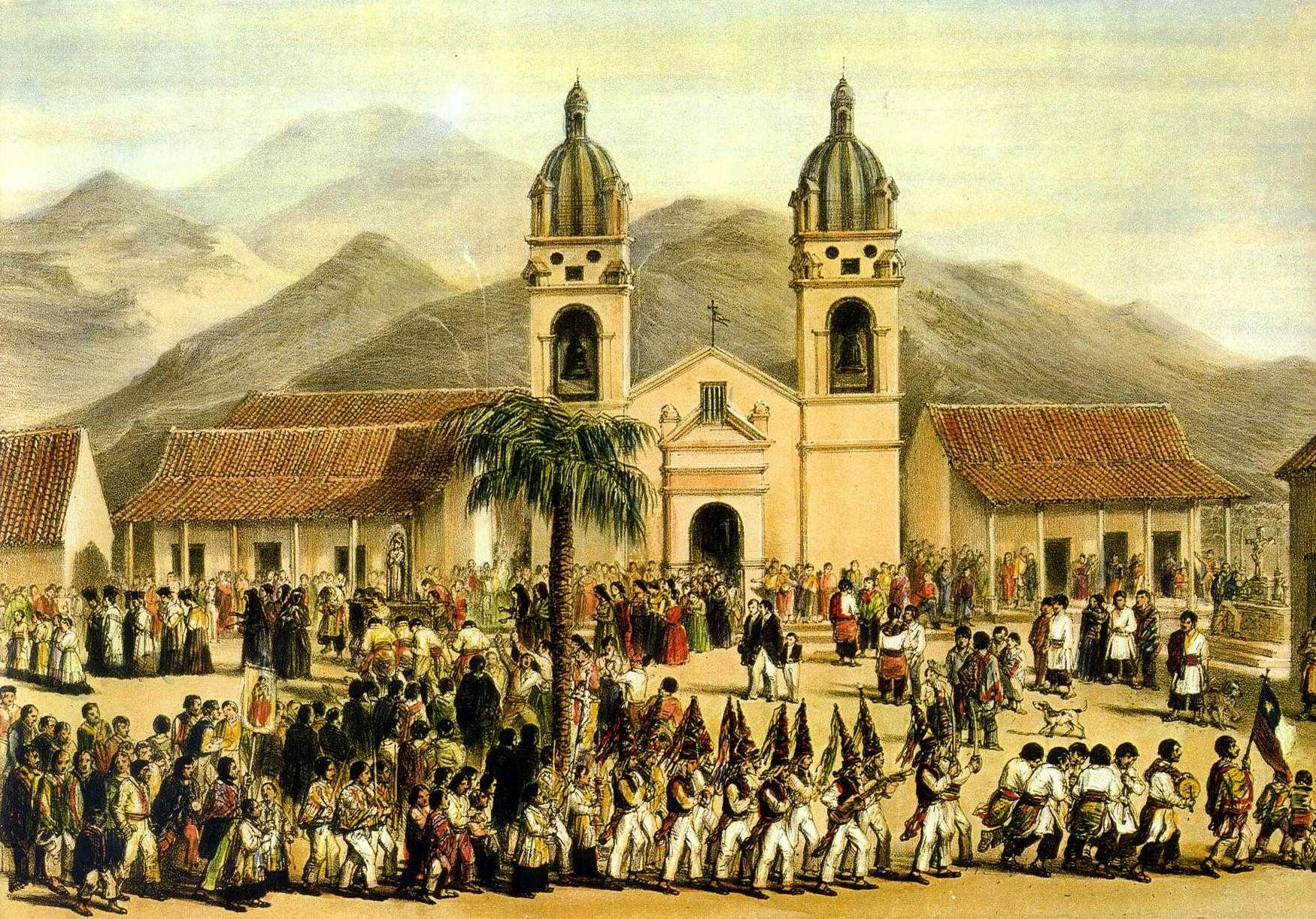
A Feast of Our Lady of Andacollo procession in Chile, 1838

The Catholic Church celebrates three Marian solemnities which are also holy days of obligation in many countries during the liturgical year (in liturgical order):

- December 8 Feast of the Immaculate Conception
- January 1 Mary, Mother of God
- August 15 The Assumption of the Blessed Virgin Mary

Among the other prominent Marian feast days and memorials in the General Roman Calendar of the Catholic Church are:

- December 10 Our Lady of Loreto
- December 12 Our Lady of Guadalupe
- February 11 Our Lady of Lourdes
- May 13 Our Lady of Fátima
- May 31 Visitation of the Blessed Virgin Mary
- Blessed Virgin Mary, Mother of the Church (Monday after Pentecost)
- Immaculate Heart of Mary (Saturday after Sacred Heart of Jesus)
- July 16 Our Lady of Mount Carmel
- August 5 Dedication of the Basilica of Saint Mary Major
- August 22 Queenship of Mary
- September 8 Nativity of the Blessed Virgin Mary
- September 12 Most Holy Name of Mary
- September 15 Our Lady of Sorrows
- October 7 Our Lady of the Rosary
- November 21 Presentation of the Blessed Virgin Mary

== Titles ==
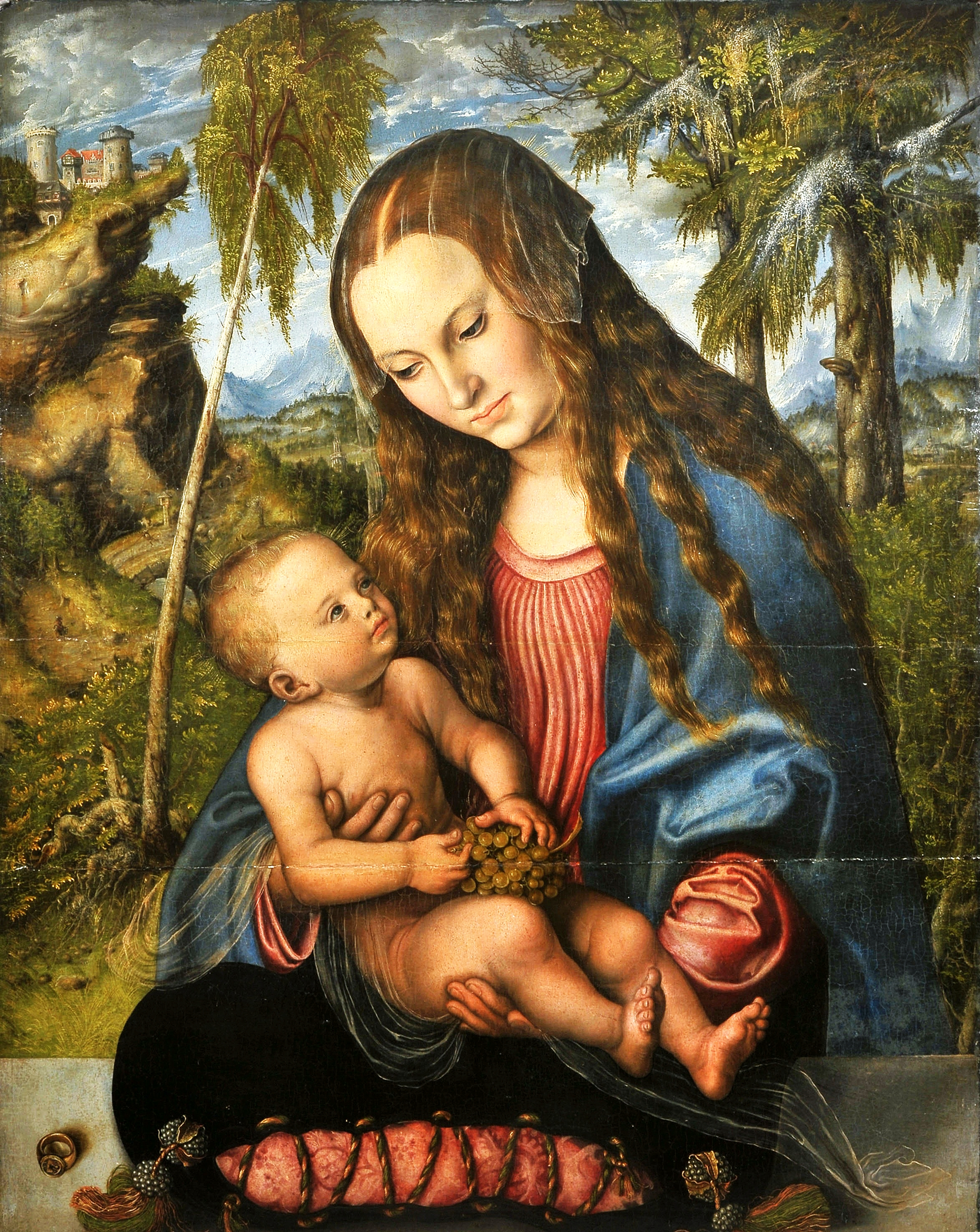
The Blessed Virgin Mary depicted as mother, holding the Child Jesus. Archdiocesan Museum, Wrocław.

A large number of titles to honor Mary or ask for her intercession are used by Catholics. While Mater Dei (i.e. "Mother of God" as confirmed by the First Council of Ephesus, 431) is common in Latin, a large number of other titles have been used by Catholics – far more than any other Christians.

Titles used to refer to the Virgin Mary throughout history, at times reflect the changing attitudes towards her. Domina (lady), Regina (queen) and Stella Maris (star of the sea) are some of the early titles of Mary, of which Regina is the earliest. Domina and Sella Maris are found in Jerome who perhaps originated the etymology of Mary as Stella Maris in the 5th century. While the early emphasis in Stella Maris was on Mary as the Star that bore Christ, by the 9th century, the attention had focused on Mary herself, as indicated in the hymn Ave Maris Stella. By the 11th century, Mary herself had emerged as the star that acted as a guiding light. By the 13th century, as Mariology was growing, Anthony of Padua had composed Mary Our Queen. Titles continue to be interpreted, e.g. Queen of Heaven was further elaborated in 1954 in the papal encyclical Ad Caeli Reginam by pope Pius XII.

Among the most prominent Catholic Marian titles are:

- Mary, Mother of God
- Mary, the Immaculate Conception
- Mary, Queen of Heaven
- Queen of the Angels
- Queen of Peace
- Star of the Sea (Stella Maris)
- Mother of All Sorrows

== Music ==
Alma Redemptoris Mater
Marian antiphon sung at Compline and Lauds between the First Sunday of Advent and Candlemas

=== Antiphons ===
The Liturgy of the Hours includes several offices to be sung, including Compline. At the close of this office, one of four Marian antiphons is sung. These songs, Alma redemptoris mater, Ave Regina caelorum, Regina caeli, and Salve Regina, have been described as "among the most beautiful creations of the late Middle Ages".

One of the earliest Marian compositions is the popular Salve Regina in Latin from a Benedictine monk, which exists in several Gregorian versions. Hermann of Reichenau (July 18, 1013 – September 24, 1054), composed the Alma redemptoris mater and hymns to Mary became part of daily life at monasteries such as the Benedictine Abbey of Cluny in France.

While the date of the composition of Ave Regina caelorum is uncertain, conjecture that it antedates the fourth century seems to be without any warrant of external or internal evidence. It is found in the St. Alban's Book of the twelfth century. The Regina Caeli has been traced back to the twelfth century.

It is difficult to trace the beginning of non-Gregorian Marian liturgical music. In 1277 Pope Nicholas III prescribed rules for liturgy in Roman churches. In the Graduale Romanum, Kyriale IX and X are both for Marian feasts. Over the centuries, Marian master pieces have continued to appear, e.g. Mozart's Coronation Mass. The list of compositions by Giovanni Pierluigi da Palestrina includes numerous Marian masses: Salve Regina, Alma Redemptoris, Assumpta est Maria, Regina caeli, de beata Virgine, Ave Regina caelorum, Descendit Angelus Domini, and O Virgo simul et Mater. Joseph Haydn wrote several Marian compositions including two famous Marian Masses.

Marian hymns include O Mary, we Crown Thee With Blossoms Today, Hail Queen of Heaven, the Regina Caeli, and the Ave Maria.

== Prayers ==
Author Emily Shapcote lists 150 Marian poems and hymns in her book Mary the Perfect Woman. Such prayers and poems go as far back as the 3rd century, but enjoyed a rapid growth during the 11th and 12th centuries. Some of the best poetry written in honor of the Blessed virgin comes from this period of the Middle Ages.

"Because of Mary's singular cooperation with the action of the Holy Spirit, the Church loves to pray in communion with the Virgin Mary, to magnify with her the great things the Lord has done for her, and to entrust supplications and praises to her.

The earliest known Marian prayer is the Sub tuum praesidium, or Beneath Thy Protection, a text for which was rediscovered in 1917 on a papyrus in Egypt dated often to c. 250, but by others to the 5–6th century. The papyrus contains the prayer in Greek and is the earliest known reference to the title Theotokos (confirmed by the Council of Ephesus in 431):

Beneath your compassion, We take refuge, O Mother of God: do not despise our petitions in time of trouble: but rescue us from dangers, only pure, only blessed one.

The Little Office of the Blessed Virgin Mary probably originated as a monastic devotion around the middle of the eighth century. It is a variation of the Common of the Blessed Virgin Mary in the Liturgy of the Hours (Divine Office). It may have originally been put together to be prayed in connection with the Votive Masses of Our Lady on Saturday, which were written by Alcuin, the liturgical master of Charlemagne's court. The Little Office did not come into general use before the tenth century.

During the 11th century, as the number of monasteries grew, so did Marian prayers. There is little or no trace of the Hail Mary as an accepted devotional formula before about 1050. All the evidence suggests that it took its rise from certain versicles and responsories occurring in the Little Office or Cursus of the Blessed Virgin which just at that time was coming into favour among the monastic orders. Two Anglo-Saxon manuscripts at the British Museum, one of which may be as old as the year 1030, show that the words "Ave Maria" etc. and "benedicta tu in mulieribus et benedictus fructus ventris tui" occurred in almost every part of the Cursus, and though it is not clear that these clauses were at first joined together so as to make one prayer, there is conclusive evidence that this had come to pass only a very little later. As regards the addition of the word "Jesus," it is commonly said that this was due to the initiative of Pope Urban IV (1261) although the evidence does not seem sufficiently clear to warrant positive statement on the point. This was the prayer as known to Thomas Aquinas when he gave a Lenten sermon on the "Salutation of the Blessed Virgin" in 1273. By the fourteenth century it was not uncommon to conclude with an appeal for sinners and especially for help at the hour of death. Official recognition of the Ave Maria in its complete form was finally given in the Roman Breviary of 1568.

The Angelus, 1857–1859, Jean-François Millet

Three Hail Marys is a traditional Latin Catholic devotional practice of reciting three Hail Marys as a petition for purity and other virtues. The practice of saying three Hail Marys in the evening somewhere about sunset had become general throughout Europe in the first half of the fourteenth century and it was recommended by Pope John XXII in 1318. The practice was observed by Franciscans and eventually developed into the Angelus prayer.

The Angelus is a prayer commemorating the Incarnation. It originated with the 11th-century monastic custom of reciting three Hail Marys during the evening, or Compline bell. It was traditionally recited in Western Catholic churches, convents, and monasteries three times daily: 6:00 am, noon, and 6:00 pm and is usually accompanied by the ringing of the Angelus bell, which is a call to prayer.

In the 12th century Bernard of Clairvaux gave sermons (De duodecim stellis), from which an extract has been taken by the Catholic Church and used in the Offices of the Compassion and of the Seven Dolours. Saint Bernard wrote: "Take away Mary, this star of the sea, the sea truly great and wide: what is left but enveloping darkness and the shadow of death and the densest blackness?" There are pious meditations on the Ave Maria and the Salve Regina, usually attributed either to St. Anselm of Lucca (d. 1080) or St. Bernard; and also in the large book "De laudibus B. Mariae Virginis" (Douai, 1625) by Richard de Saint-Laurent.

Other famous Marian prayers include the Magnificat, and the Litany of the Blessed Virgin Mary.

The mostly anonymous Middle English Lyrics of the Later Middle Ages show passionate forms of personal worship, known as affective devotion. The lyrics, reflecting the theology, depict Mary as not just the woman but also the ideal that all humanity should strive for.

Mary's humility is one of the qualities highlighted by in the Middle English Lyrics. The lyric "Gabriel, from hevenë king/ sent to the maidë swetë" is an excellent example of Mary's humility. The lyric's author builds upon this theme throughout the lyric. The second stanza "Mildëliche him gan answere/ The midlë maiden thannë." The theme of humility is fully developed in the third stanza:

When the maiden understood/ And th'angles wordës herdë,/ Mildëliche with mildë mod/ To th'angel she answerdë:/ 'Our Lordës thew-maiden i-wis/ Ich am, that her-aboven is./ Anentës me/ Fulforthëd be/ Thy, sawë;/ That Ich, sithe His wil is,/ Maiden, withouten lawë,/ Of moder have the blis.

== Devotions ==
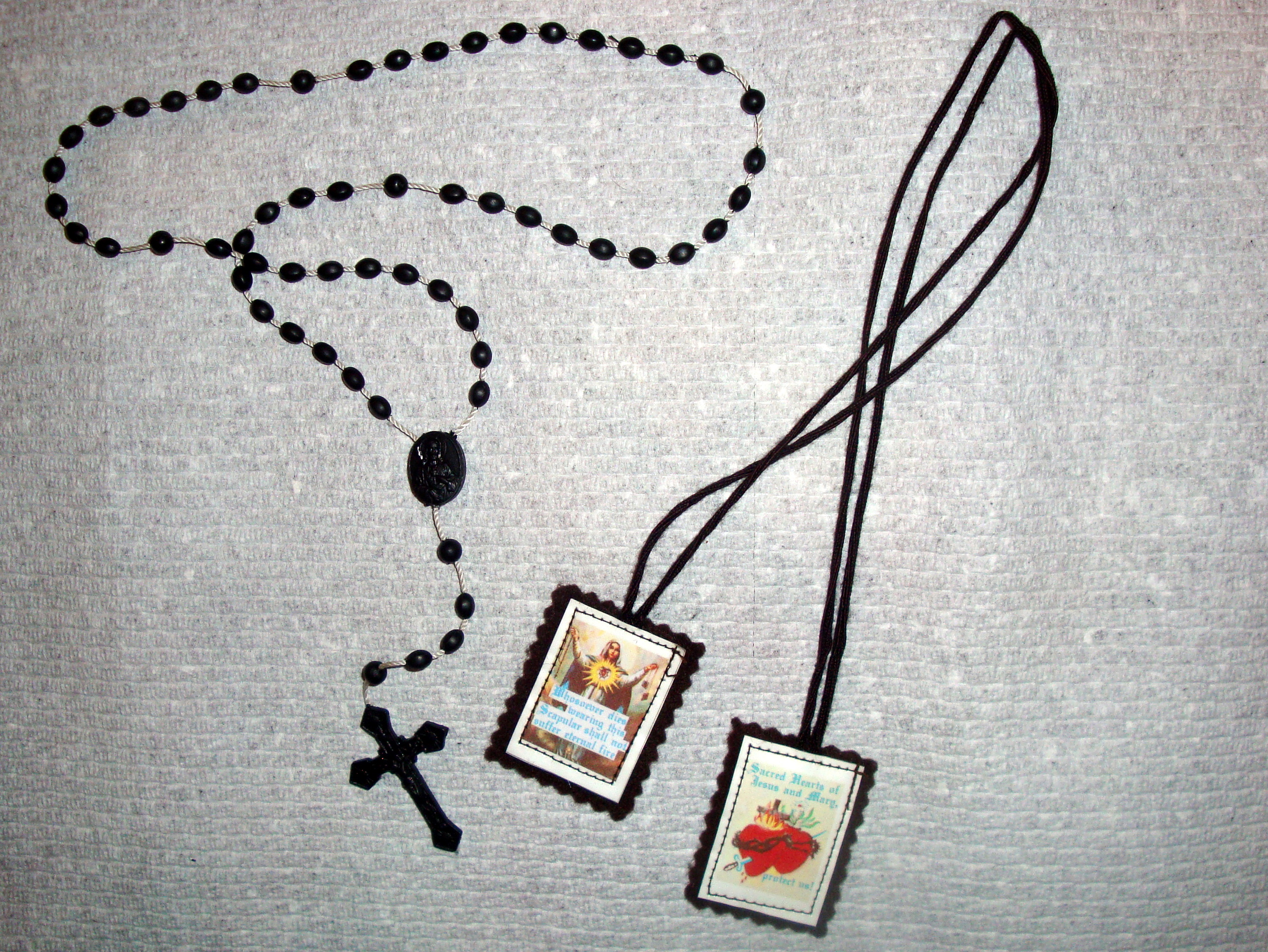
Rosary and scapular of Our Lady of Mount Carmel

The term "devotions" is commonly understood to refer to those external practices of piety by which the faith of an individual finds expression. Such prayers or acts may be accompanied by specific requests for Mary's intercession with God. Devotion to the Virgin Mary does not, however, amount to worship – which is reserved for God.

A wide range of Marian devotions are followed by Catholics ranging from simple Rosary recitations to formalized Novenas to activities which do not involve any prayers, such the wearing of scapulars or maintaining a Mary garden. Two well known Marian devotions are the Rosary recitation and the wearing of the Brown Scapular. Following their joint growth in the 18th and 19th centuries, by the early 20th century the Rosary and the devotional Scapular had gained such a strong following among Catholics worldwide that the Catholic Encyclopedia of 1914 stated: "Like the Rosary, the Brown Scapular has become the badge of the devout Catholic." In his encyclical Rosarium Virginis Mariae Pope John Paul II emphasized the importance of the Rosary. The Mariological basis of the Scapular devotion is effectively the same as Marian consecration, as discussed in the dogmatic constitution Lumen gentium of the Second Vatican Council, namely the role of the Virgin Mary as "the mother to us in the order of grace" which allows her to intercede for "the gift of eternal salvation". The same Council decree clarified that the many ways in which Mary can encourage and assist us "neither takes away from nor adds anything to the dignity and efficaciousness of Christ the one Mediator."

Catholic tradition includes specific prayers and devotions as Acts of Reparation to the Virgin Mary for insults that she suffers. The Raccolta Catholic prayer book (approved by a Decree of 1854, and published by the Holy See in 1898) includes a number of such prayers. These prayers do not involve a petition for a living or deceased beneficiary, but aim to repair the sins of others against the Virgin Mary.

=== Consecration and entrustment to Mary ===
For centuries, Marian devotions among Catholics have included many examples of personal or collective acts of consecration and entrustment to the Virgin Mary; the Latin terms oblatio, servitus, commendatio, and dedicatio were used in this context.

The Catholic Church makes it clear that "the faithful should be carefully instructed about the practice of consecration to the Blessed Virgin Mary ... it is, in reality, only analogously a 'consecration to God,' and should be expressed in a correct liturgical manner: to the Father, through Christ in the Holy Spirit, imploring the intercession of the Blessed Virgin Mary, to whom we entrust ourselves completely, so as to keep our baptismal commitments and live as her children."

Individuals declaring their "entrustment" to Mary seek her intercession before God through her son Jesus Christ, for she herself has no divine power. In Catholic teachings, consecration to Mary does not diminish or substitute the love of God, but enhances it, for all consecration is ultimately made to God.

In modern times, Pope John Paul II clarified consecration to Mary in his 1987 encyclical, Redemptoris mater, in which he stated, "Mary's motherhood ... is a gift which Christ himself makes personally to every individual."

== Catholic view of Marian apparitions ==
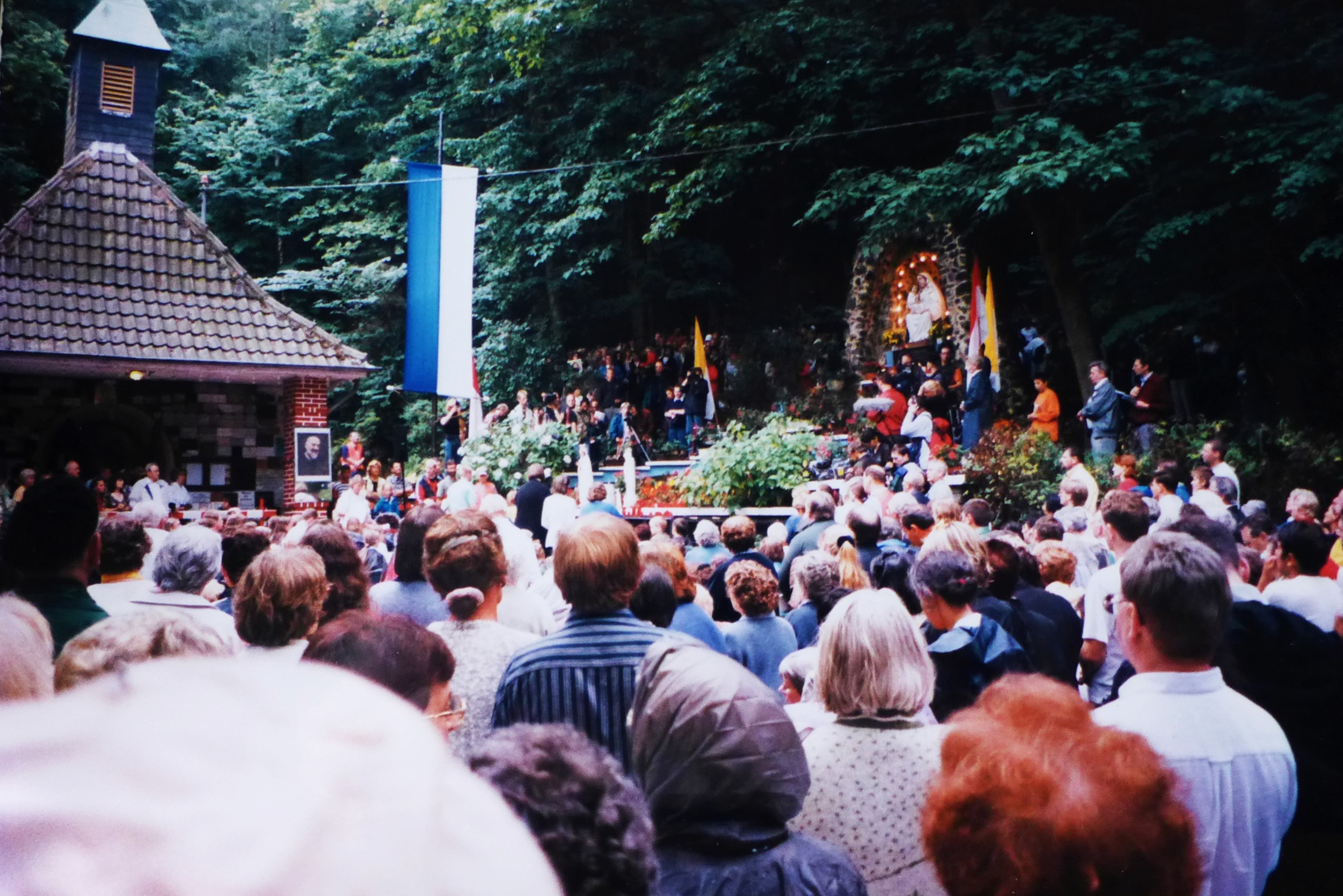
In Marpingen, Germany, Our Lady is said to have appeared several times to three groups of visionaries: in 1876–1877, then in 1934–1936, and finally in 1999. The investigation conducted by the Bishop of Trier after the last apparition concluded in 2005 that "the events in Marpingen cannot be confirmed as being of supernatural origin".

Many Marian apparitions have been reported by believers, including Our Lady of Lourdes, Our Lady of Guadalupe, and Our Lady of Fátima. In some cases (e.g. Alexandrina of Balazar, Padre Pio or Maria Pierina De Micheli) these have involved visions of Jesus and Mary and sometimes include a spoken element.

The official position of the Holy See is that while the Holy Office has approved a few apparitions of the Virgin Mary, Catholics at large are not required to believe them. However, many Catholics express belief in Marian apparitions. This has included popes, e.g. four popes, i.e. Pope Pius XII, Pope John XXIII, Pope Paul VI, Pope John Paul II, Pope Benedict XVI and Pope Francis have supported the Our Lady of Fátima apparitions as supernatural. Pope John Paul II was particularly attached to Fátima and credited the Blessed Virgin of Fátima with saving his life after he was shot in Rome on the Feast Day of Our Lady of Fátima in May 1981. He donated the bullet that wounded him on that day to the Catholic sanctuary at Fátima, Portugal.

As a historical pattern, Vatican approval seems to have followed general acceptance of a vision by well over a century in most cases. According to Salvatore M. Perrella of the Mariunum Pontifical Institute in Rome, of the 295 reported apparitions studied by the Holy See through the centuries only 12 have been approved, the latest being in May 2008.

== Veneration through Marian art ==
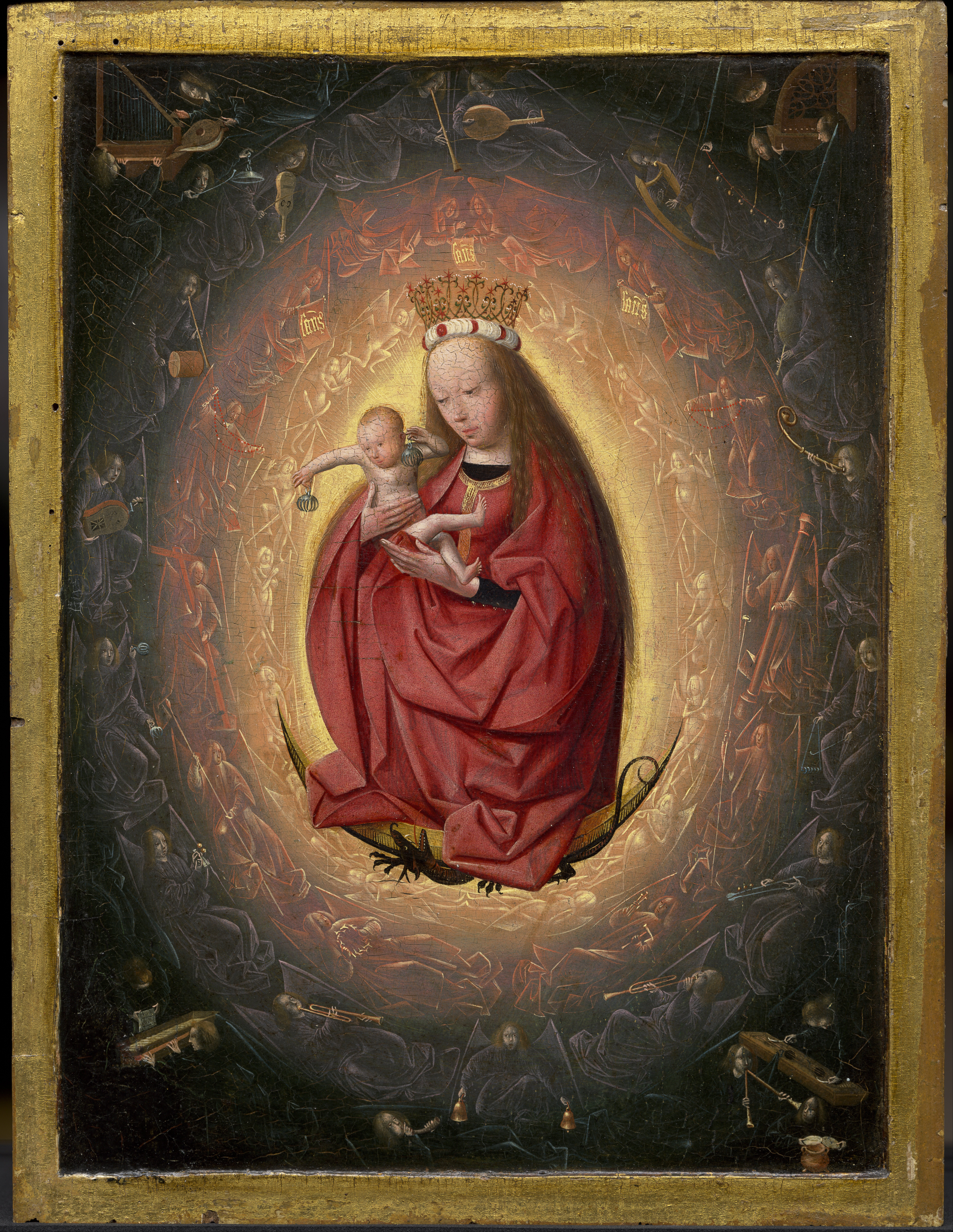
The Glorification of the Virgin (c. 1490–1495) by Geertgen tot Sint Jans

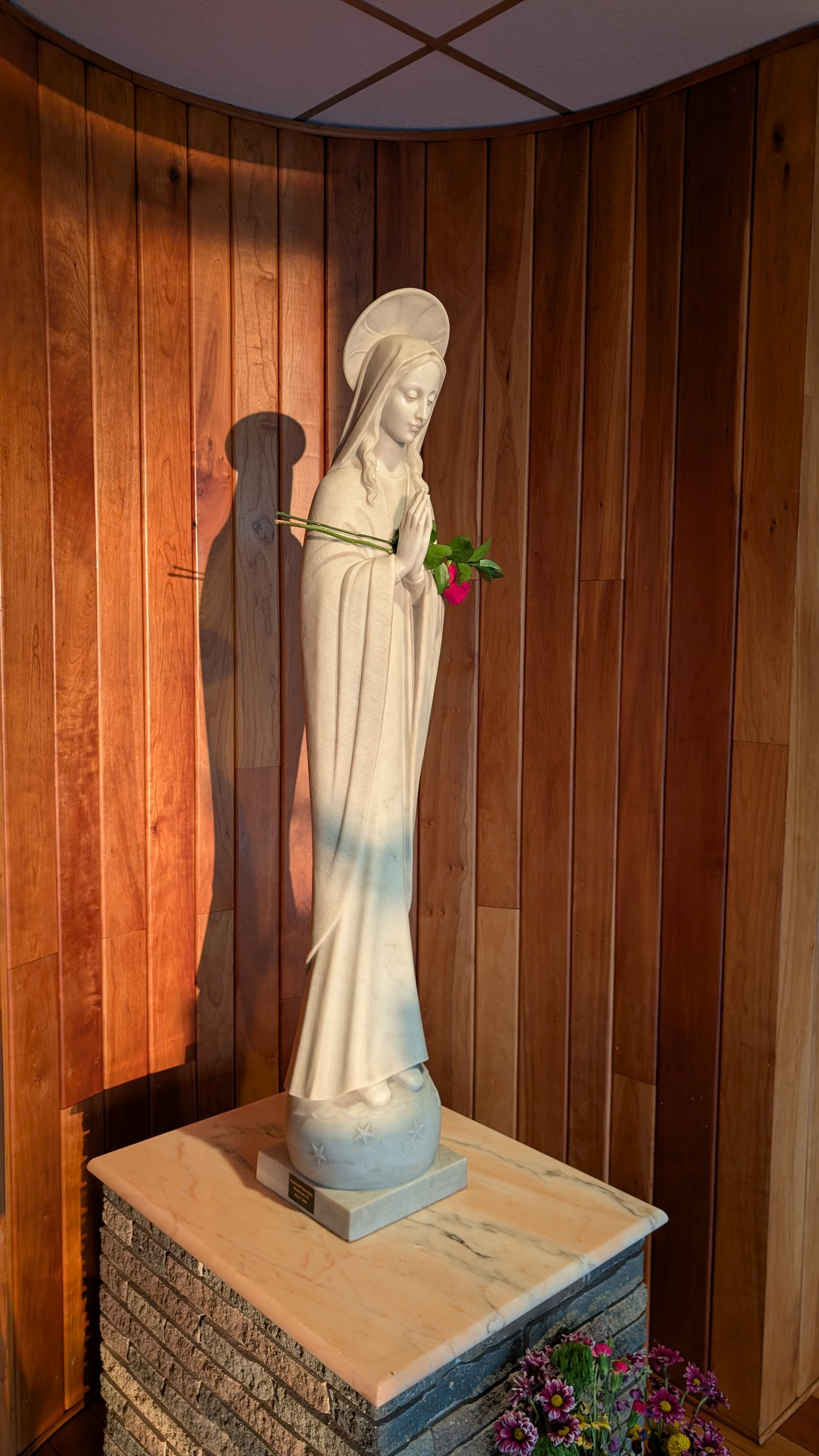
A rose left on a statue of mary to honor her at the Novitiate and College of Humanities of the Legionaries of Christ

The tradition of honoring Mary by venerating images of her goes back to 3rd-century Christianity. Following the period of iconoclasm, the position of the church with respect to the veneration of images was formalized at the Second Council of Nicaea in 787. A summary of the doctrine is included in the current Catechism of the Catholic Church.

The Christian veneration of images is not contrary to the first commandment which proscribes idols. Indeed, "the honour rendered to an image passes to its prototype," and "whoever venerates an image venerates the person portrayed in it." The honour paid to sacred images is a "respectful veneration," not the adoration due to God alone: Religious worship is not directed to images in themselves, considered as mere things, but under their distinctive aspect as images leading us on to God Incarnate. The movement toward the image does not terminate in it as image, but tends towards that whose image it is.

No other image (in either the Western or the Eastern Church) permeates Christian art as much as the image of Madonna and Child. The images of the Virgin Mary have become central icons of Catholicism and Eastern Orthodox Christianity where Mary remains a central artistic topic. Byzantine images of the Theotokos were adopted in the West, where Byzantine models became widely distributed in by the 7th century. The Virgin Mary has been one of the major subjects of Christian art, Catholic Art and Western Art since Early Christian art and she has been very widely portrayed in iconic "portraits", often known as Madonnas, with the infant Jesus in the Madonna and Child, and in a number of narrative scenes from her life known as the Life of the Virgin, as well as scenes illustrating particular doctrines or beliefs: from masters such as Michelangelo, Raphael, Murillo and Botticelli to folk art.

Some Marian art subjects include the:

- Annunciation
- Adoration of the Magi
- Adoration of the shepherds
- Assumption of the Virgin Mary in Art
- Coronation of the Virgin
- Christ taking leave of his mother
- Immaculate Conception
- Pietà

Marian art enjoys a significant level of diversity, e.g. with distinct styles of statues of the Virgin Mary present on different continents (as depicted in the galleries in Catholic Marian art). These depictions are not restricted to European art, and also appear in South American paintings. The South American tradition of Marian veneration through art dates back to the 16th century, with the Virgin of Copacabana gaining fame in 1582.

== Marian movements and societies ==
Throughout the centuries the devotion to and the veneration of the Virgin Mary by Catholics has both led to, and been influenced by a number of Catholic Marian movements and societies. These societies form part of the fabric of Catholic Mariology. As early as the 16th century, the Holy See endorsed the Sodality of Our Lady and Gregory XIII issued a papal bull commending it and granting it indulgences and establishing it as the mother sodality, and other sodalities were formed thereafter.

The 18th and 19th centuries saw a number of missionary Marian organizations such as Company of Mary, the Marianists, the Marist Fathers, and the Marist Brothers. Some of these missionaries, e.g. Peter Chanel, were martyred as they travelled to new lands. The 20th century witnessed the formation of Marian organizations with millions of members, e.g. the Legion of Mary and Blue Army of Our Lady of Fatima.

== Marian shrines and patronages ==
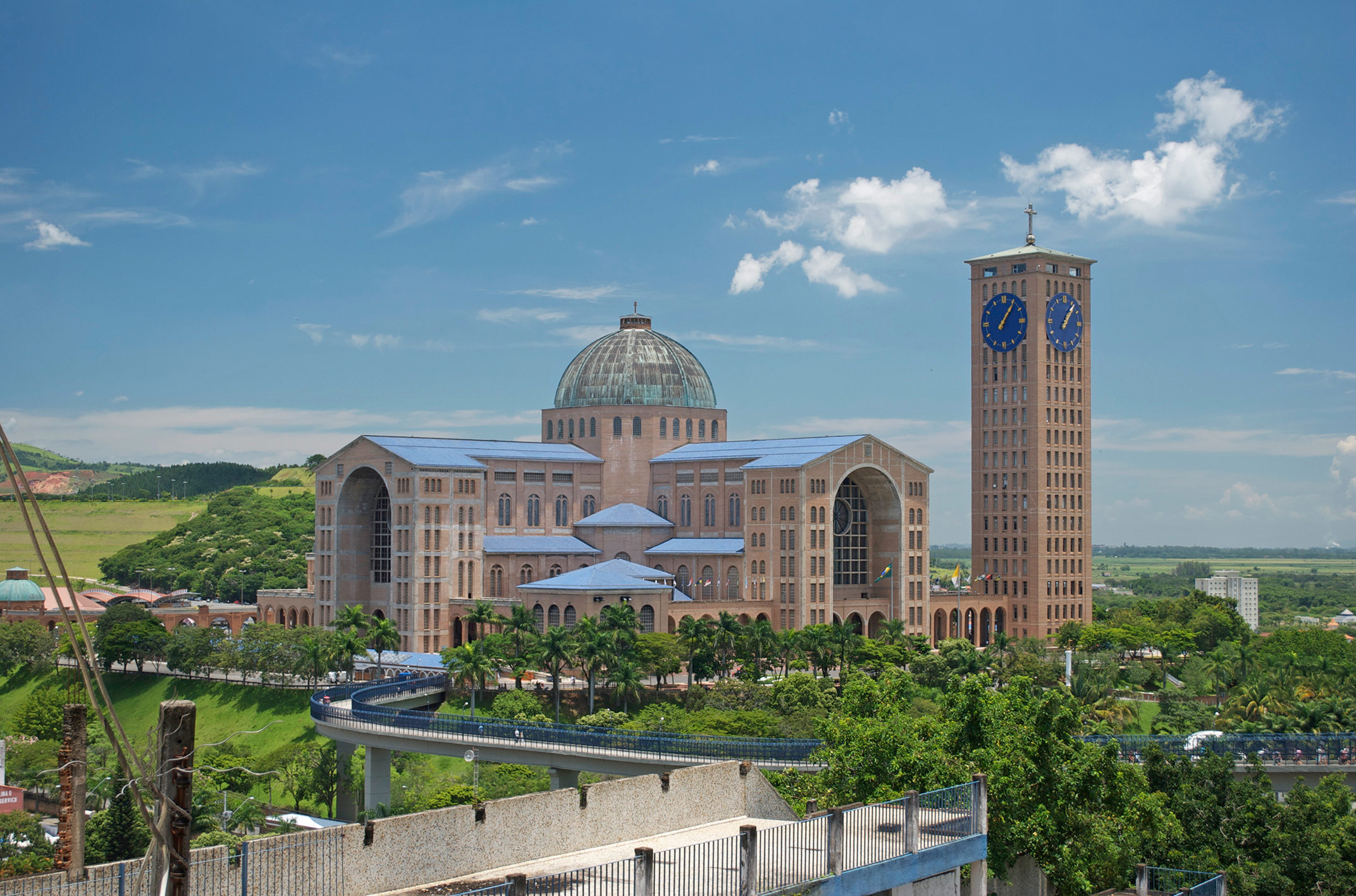
The Marian Basilica of Our Lady of Aparecida, Brazil, the largest church in the Americas

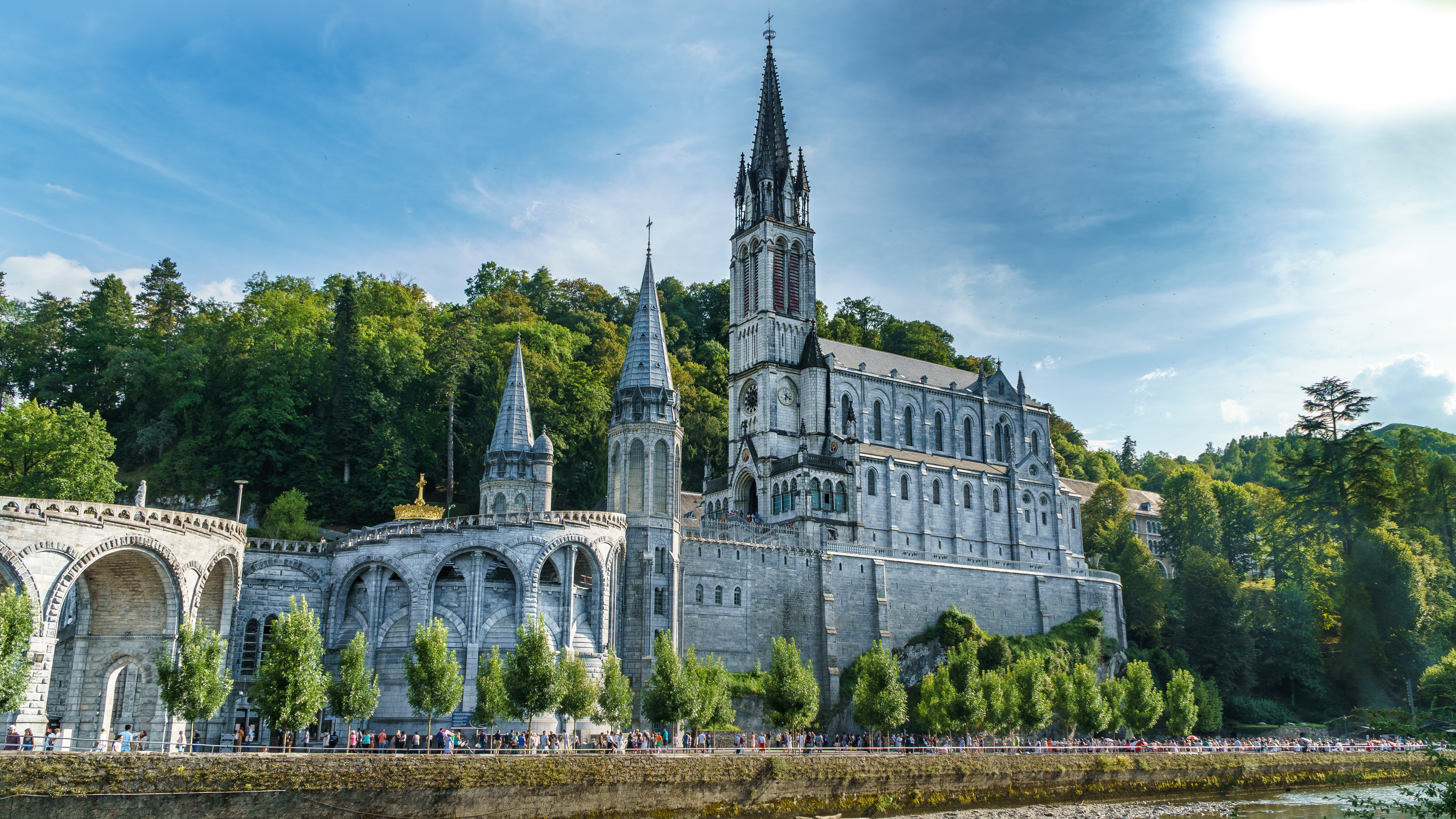
The Basilica of the Immaculate Conception in Lourdes, France

The Basilica of Our Lady of the Rosary in Fátima, Portugal

In the Catholic Church, a shrine is a church or sacred place which receives many faithful pilgrims for a specific pious reason. The local ordinary must approve the shrine.

Marian shrines account for major veneration centers and pilgrimage sites for Catholics. According to Bishop Francesco Giogia, at the end of the 20th century, the most visited Catholic shrine in the world was that of the Virgin of Guadalupe in Mexico City. In third place was Our Lady of Aparecida in Brazil, with the non-Marian shrine of San Giovanni Rotondo in second place. The visual effect of Marian pilgrimages can be dramatic, e.g. on May 13 and October 13 of each year close to one million Catholic pilgrims walk the country road that leads to the Sanctuary of Our Lady of Fátima. Around 2 million pilgrims journey up Tepeyac hill on December 12 each year to visit the Basilica of Our Lady of Guadalupe. While in 1968 Aparecida had about four million pilgrims, the number has since reached eight million pilgrims per year.

Major Marian shrines include:

- The Sanctuary of Our Lady of Lourdes in Lourdes, France
- The Basilica of Our Lady of Guadalupe in Mexico City, Mexico
- The Sanctuary of Our Lady of Fátima in Fátima, Portugal
- The Basilica of Our Lady of Good Health in Vailankanni, India
- The Basilica of the Our Lady of Peñafrancia in Naga City, Philippines
- The Basilica of the Holy House in Loreto, Italy
- The Shrine of Black Madonna of Częstochowa in Częstochowa, Poland
- The Basilica of Our Lady, Queen of Ireland in Knock, Ireland
- The Basilica of Our Lady of Ta' Pinu in Gozo, Malta.

There are other Marian pilgrimage sites such as Medjugorje, which is not considered a shrine by the Holy See, but yet receives a large number of pilgrims every year. The number of pilgrims who visit some of the approved shrines every year can be significant. E.g. Lourdes with a population of around 15,000 people, receives about 5,000,000 pilgrims every year. In 1881 a French priest, Julien Gouyet, led by the visions of Jesus and Mary of Anne Catherine Emmerich (Klemens Brentano, 1852) discovered the House of the Virgin Mary near Ephesus in Turkey.

A number of countries, cities, and professions consider the Blessed Virgin their patron saint. For a list, see Patronage of the Blessed Virgin Mary.

== Cultural adaptations ==
Echoing the Byzantine depiction of Christ Pantocrator, the Eastern Church portrayed Mary as the regal Queen of Heaven. As this theme spread to the West, prayers such as the Regina caeli, Ave Regina caelorum, and Salve Regina were composed.

An example of the cultural adaptation of perspective includes the view of the Virgin Mary as a mother with humility (rather than a heavenly queen) as the Franciscans began to preach in China, and its similarity to the local Chinese motherly and merciful figure of Kuanyin, which was much admired in south China. Another example is the Juan Diego's account of the appearance of the Virgin of Guadalupe in 1531 as a tanned Aztec princess who spoke in his local Nahuatl language. The clothing of the Virgin of Guadalupe image has been identified as that of an Aztec princess.

Other views, such as the Virgin Mary as a "miracle worker" have existed for centuries and are still held by many Catholics as of 2015. Instances include the Black Madonna of Częstochowa which continues to be venerated today as the Patron of Poland, and Our Lady of Lourdes – Lourdes receives millions of pilgrims per year. However, the Vatican has generally been reluctant to approve of modern miracles, unless they have been subject to extensive analysis and scrutiny.

== See also ==
- Ecumenical views of Mary

== Sources ==
- Ball, Ann (2003). Encyclopedia of Catholic Devotions and Practices. Our Sunday Visitor. ISBN 0-87973-910-X.
- Bäumer, Remigius; Scheffczyk, Leo (1994). Marienlexikon Gesamtausgabe (in German). Institutum Marianum Regensburg. ISBN 3-88096-891-8. (cited as Bäumer)
- McNally, Terrence (2009). What Every Catholic Should Know about Mary. Xlibris Corporation. ISBN 978-1-4415-1051-8.
- Pope Paul VI. (November 21, 1964), Lumen gentium §60
