= Regina caeli =

Medieval hymn to Mary, mother of Jesus

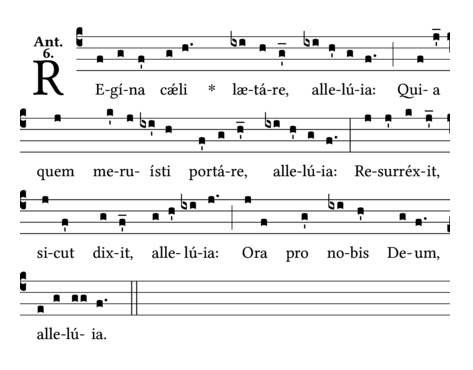
Chant notation of the "Regina caeli" antiphon in simple tone

"Regina caeli" (Ecclesiastical Latin: [reˈdʒina ˈtʃeli]; Queen of Heaven) is a musical antiphon addressed to the Blessed Virgin Mary that is used in the liturgy of the Roman Rite of the Catholic Church during the Easter season, from Easter Sunday until Pentecost. During this season, it is the Marian antiphon that ends Compline (Night Prayer) and it takes the place of the traditional thrice-daily Angelus prayer.

In medieval sources, the text is spelled "Regina celi," as in the manuscript below. In the past, the spelling Regina coeli was sometimes used, but this spelling is no longer found in official liturgical books.

== Text ==
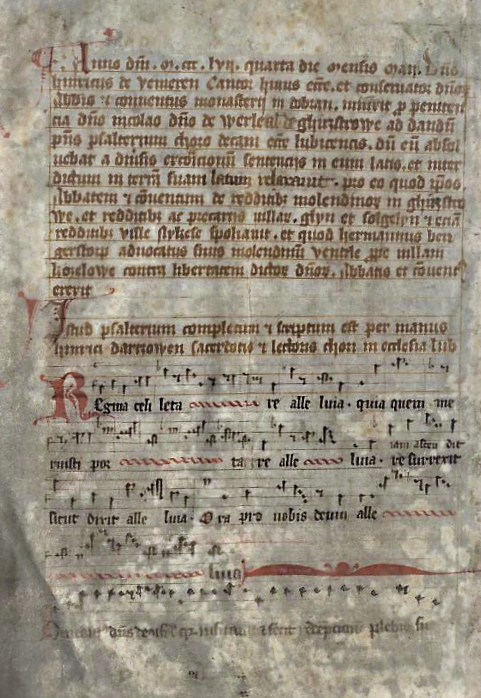
A 1359 manuscript with the text and plainchant melody

The antiphon itself consists of four lines:

Regina cæli, lætare, alleluia;
Quia quem meruisti portare, alleluia,
Resurrexit, sicut dixit, alleluia:
Ora pro nobis Deum, alleluia.

Translation:

Queen of heaven, rejoice, alleluia.
The Son you merited to bear, alleluia,
Has risen as he said, alleluia.
Pray to God for us, alleluia.

Compline, as revised in 1969 after the Second Vatican Council, ends with the antiphon alone. In the earlier Roman Breviary and in recitation at Angelus time during Eastertide, the following versicle and the following prayer are added to the antiphon:

℣. Gaude et lætare, Virgo Maria, alleluia.
℟. Quia surrexit Dominus vere, alleluia.
Oremus.
Deus, qui per resurrectionem Filii tui Domini nostri Iesu Christi, mundum lætificare dignatus es: præsta, quæsumus, ut, per eius Genetricem Virginem Mariam, perpetuæ capiamus gaudia vitæ. Per Christum, Dominum nostrum.
℟. Amen.

Translation:

℣. Rejoice and be glad, O Virgin Mary, alleluia.
℟. For the Lord has truly risen, alleluia.
Let us pray.
O God, who have been pleased to gladden the world by the Resurrection of your Son our Lord Jesus Christ, grant, we pray, that through his Mother, the Virgin Mary, we may receive the joys of everlasting life. Through Christ our Lord.
℟. Amen.

A verse translation in 7.7.7.7 metre used in some Anglican churches is usually sung to the hymn tune known as the Easter Hymn "Christ the Lord is Risen Today" (Jesus Christ is risen today) or the hymn tune "Ave Virgo Virginum" (Hail Virgin of virgins):

℣. Joy to thee, O Queen of Heaven. Alleluia!
℟. He whom Thou wast meet to bear, Alleluia!
℣. As He promised hath arisen, Alleluia!
℟. Pour for us to God thy prayer. Alleluia!

℣. Rejoice and be glad, O Virgin Mary, alleluia.
℟. For the Lord is risen indeed, alleluia.
Let us pray:
O God, who through the resurrection of Thy Son, our Lord Jesus Christ, didst vouchsafe to give joy to the whole world: grant, we beseech thee, that through His Mother, the Virgin Mary, we may obtain the joys of everlasting life. Through the same Christ our Lord. ℟. Amen.

== History ==
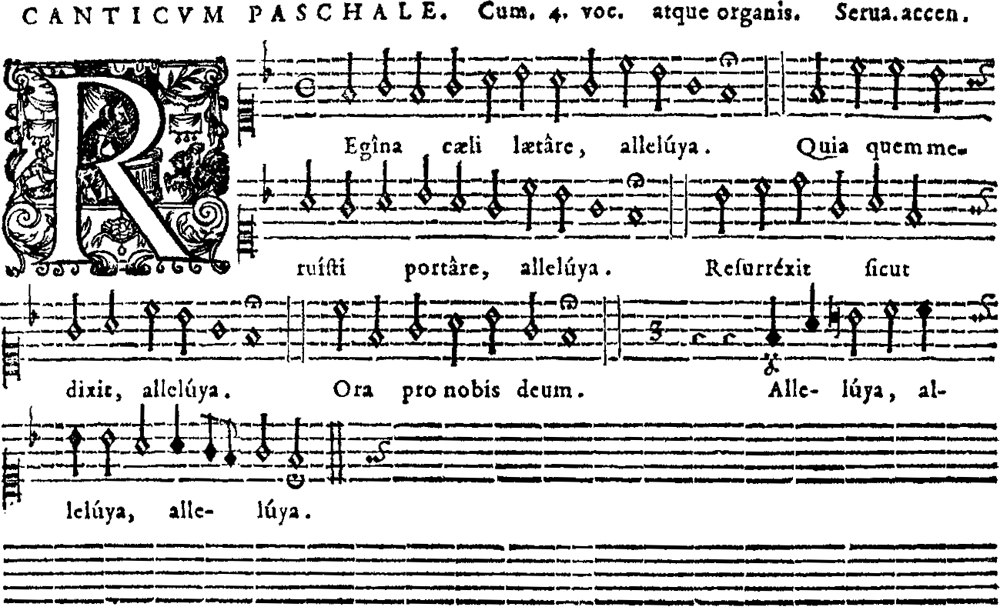
Part of the setting by Charles de Courbe

The authorship of "Regina caeli" is unknown. It has been traced back to the 12th century and is found in an antiphonary of c. 1200 now in St Peter's Basilica in Rome. In the first half of the 13th century it was in Franciscan use, after compline.

Jacobus de Voragine's thirteenth-century Golden Legend includes a story that, during a procession with an image of the Blessed Virgin that was held to pray for the ending of a pestilence in Rome, angels were heard singing the first three lines of the "Regina caeli" antiphon, to which Pope Gregory the Great (590−604) thereupon added the fourth, after which he saw, atop what would consequently become known as the Castel Sant'Angelo, a vision of an angel sheathing his sword, thus signifying the cessation of the plague.

== Polyphonic settings ==
As well as the plainsong melodies (a simple and an ornate form) associated with it, the "Regina caeli" has, since the 16th century, often been provided with polyphonic settings. Pierre de Manchicourt's setting was published in 1539. Tomás Luis de Victoria composed a setting for five voices in 1572 and another for eight voices in 1576. Giovanni Pierluigi da Palestrina also composed at least two settings of the antiphon. A setting for four voices by Charles de Courbe dates from 1622, and Lully's motet Regina coeli, laetare dates from 1684. 7 Regina caeli, H.16, H.30, H.31, H.32, H.32 a, H.32 b, H.46, (1670–1680) have been composed by Marc-Antoine Charpentier. There are two settings by François Giroust, three settings by the young Mozart (K. 108, K. 127, and K. 276), and one by Brahms (Op. 37 #3).

== Indulgence ==
Benedict XIV established the same indulgences as the Angelus, i.e. those granted by Benedict XIII with the indult of 14 September 1724: plenary indulgence once a month, on a day of one’s choice, to those who, having confessed, contrited and communicated, had devoutly recited the prayer in the morning, at noon and in the evening, at the ringing of the bell, and 100 days of indulgence in the same way to those who had recited it in the other days, with the faculty not to lose the indulgence for those who recited the Angelus without knowing the Regina Caeli and subsequent faculty granted on 5 December 1727 to the religious busy at the ringing of the bell to recite the prayer at another time.

Leo XIII (1878–1903) modified the conditions for obtaining the indulgence, making them easier. Until the reform of indulgences implemented by Pope Paul VI in 1967 the same indulgence was still granted.

The Enchiridion Indulgentiarum currently includes a partial indulgence for the faithful who recite the Regina Caeli at the three prescribed times of day during the Easter season. Obtaining the indulgence does not require the recitation of the Gloria Patri and what follows. This concession is given for texts approved by the Holy See, therefore it is necessary that the texts in the vernacular are approved by the Episcopal Conferences and subsequently confirmed by the Congregation for Divine Worship and the Discipline of the Sacraments. Therefore, differing translations are not indulged and can possibly be used for private performance. As with all indulgences, it is necessary to be in a state of grace; furthermore, the indulgence is applicable to oneself or the Poor Souls in Purgatory, but not to other living people on earth.

== See also ==
- Queen of Heaven
- Angelus
- "Alma Redemptoris Mater"
- "Ave Regina caelorum"
- "Salve Regina"
- Veni Sancte Spiritus
