= Alma Redemptoris Mater =

Medieval hymn to Mary, mother of Jesus

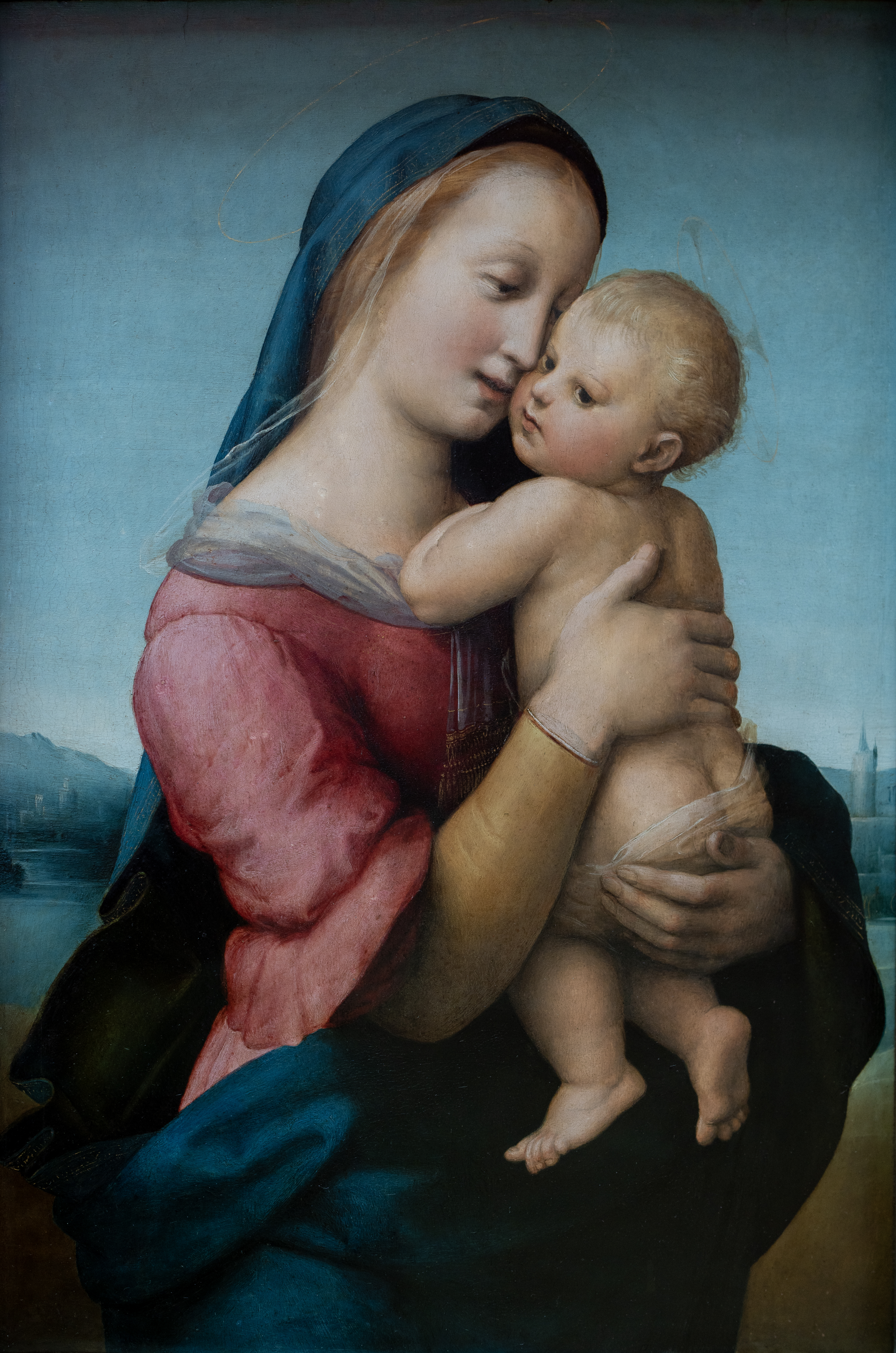
Madonna by Raphael, an example of Marian art

"Alma Redemptoris Mater" (Ecclesiastical Latin: [ˈalma redempˈtoris ˈmater]; "Loving Mother of our Redeemer") is a Marian hymn, written in Latin hexameter, and one of four seasonal liturgical Marian antiphons sung at the end of the office of Compline (the other three being Ave Regina Caelorum, Regina Caeli and Salve Regina).

== History ==
Hermannus Contractus (also called Herman the Cripple; 1013–1054) is said to have authored the hymn based on the writings of Saints Fulgentius, Epiphanius, and Irenaeus of Lyon. It is mentioned in The Prioress's Tale, one of Geoffrey Chaucer's Canterbury Tales.

At one time, Alma Redemptoris Mater was briefly used as an antiphon for the hour of Sext for the Feast of the Assumption, but since the 13th century it has been a part of Compline. Formerly, it was recited at the end of the canonical hours only from the first Sunday in Advent until the Feast of the Purification (2 February). It was translated into English by, amongst others, John Henry Newman in "Tracts for the Times", No. 75 (Kindly Mother of the Redeemer).

== Text ==
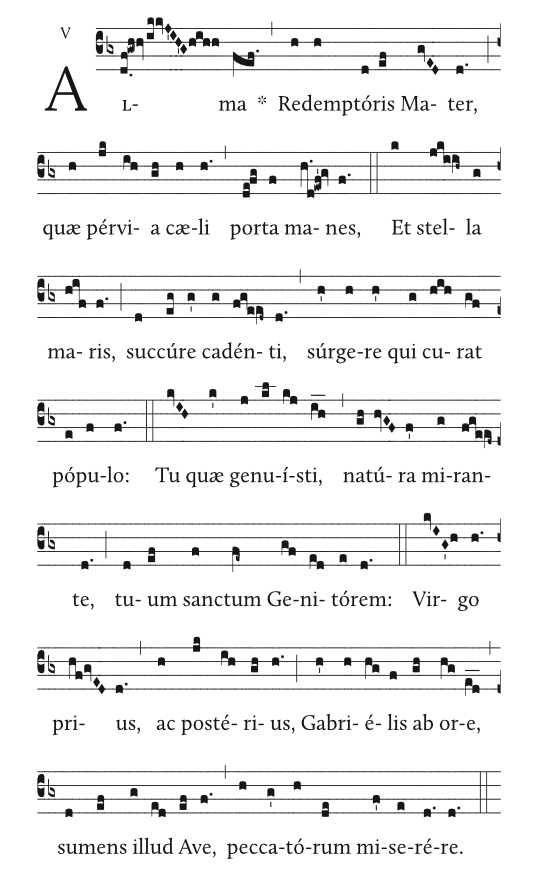
Solemn form of Alma Redemptoris Mater

=== Latin ===
Alma Redemptóris Mater, quæ pérvia cæli
Porta manes, et stella maris, succúrre cadénti,
Súrgere qui curat pópulo: tu quæ genuísti,
Natúra miránte, tuum sanctum Genitórem
Virgo prius ac postérius, Gabriélis ab ore
Sumens illud Ave, peccatórum miserére.

Depending on the period, the following combinations of a versicle, response, and collect are added. From the first Sunday of Advent until Christmas Eve, the collect from the Fourth Sunday of Advent is used, and thereafter until the Feast of the Presentation, the collect from Solemnity of Mary, Mother of God, is used.

The first collect (“Grátiam tuam quáesumus...”) is notably also used in Masses during Advent, and is exactly the same prayer that concludes the Angelus (another Marian devotion focused on the Incarnation).

==== From the first Sunday of Advent until Christmas Eve ====
℣. Ángelus Dómini nuntiávit Maríæ
℟. Et concépit de Spíritu Sancto.

Oremus
Grátiam tuam quáesumus, Dómine, méntibus nostris infúnde; ut qui, ángelo nuntiánte, Christi Fílii tui Incarnatiónem cognóvimus, per passiónem ejus et crucem, ad resurrectiónis glóriam perducámur. Per eúmdem Christum Dóminum nostrum.
℟. Amen.

==== From First Vespers of Christmas until the Presentation ====
℣. Post Partum Virgo invioláta permansísti.
℟. Dei Génitrix, intercéde pro nobis.

Orémus
Deus, qui salútis ætérnæ beátæ Maríæ virginitáte fecúnda humáno géneri práemia præstitísti: tríbue, quáesumus, ut ipsam pro nobis intercédere sentiámus, per quam merúimus, Auctórem vitæ suscípere Dóminum nostrum Jesum Christum Fílium tuum.
℟. Amen.

=== English translation ===
Loving Mother of the Redeemer,
who remains the accessible Gateway of Heaven,
and Star of the Sea,
Give aid to a falling people
that strives to rise;
O Thou who begot thy holy Creator,
while all nature marvelled,
Virgin before and after
receiving that "Ave" from the mouth of Gabriel,
have mercy on sinners.

==== From the first Sunday of Advent until Christmas Eve ====
℣. The Angel of the LORD brought tidings unto Mary
℟. And she conceived by the Holy Ghost.

Let us pray.
Pour forth we beseech Thee, O LORD, Thy grace into our hearts, that we to whom the Incarnation of Christ, Thy Son, was made known by the message of an Angel, may, by His Passion and Cross, be brought to the glory of His Resurrection. Through the same Christ, our Lord.
℟. Amen.

==== From First Vespers of Christmas until the Presentation ====
℣. After childbirth, O Virgin, thou didst remain inviolate.
℟. Intercede for us, O Mother of God.

Let us pray.
O God, Who by the fruitful virginity of blessed Mary, hast given to mankind the rewards of eternal salvation: grant, we beseech Thee, that we may experience her intercession for us, through whom we deserved to receive the Author of life, our Lord Jesus Christ, thy Son.
℟. Amen.

=== American Liturgy of the Hours translation ===
Loving mother of the Redeemer,
gate of heaven, star of the sea,
assist your people who have fallen yet strive to rise again,
To the wonderment of nature you bore your Creator,
yet remained a virgin after as before,
You who received Gabriel's joyful greeting,
have pity on us poor sinners.

=== Church Music Association of America translation ===
Kind mother of the Redeemer,
who remain the open gate of heaven and the star of the sea:
help your falling people who want to rise,
you who bore your holy Parent, while nature marveled:
a Virgin before and after,
receiving that Ave from Gabriel's mouth,
have mercy on [us] sinners.

=== Translation of Edward Caswall (1814-1878) ===
Mother of Christ! hear thou thy people’s cry,
Star of the deep, and portal of the sky!
Mother of him who thee from nothing made,
Sinking we strive, and call to thee for aid:
Oh, by that joy which Gabriel brought to thee,
Thou Virgin first and last, let us thy mercy see.

In The Divine Office (1974) this is hymn number 118 and it recommends singing it to the tune SONG I, by Orlando Gibbons (1583-1625). This tune has a metre 10.10.10.10.10.10. Since the last line of the text has 12 syllables the tune will need to be modified.

== Musical settings ==
Marc-Antoine Charpentier, 2 settings, Alma Redemptoris Mater H.21 (1675), for 2 voices and bc, Alma Redemptoris Mater H.44 (16 ?), for soloists, chorus, 2 violins and bc.
