= Ave Regina caelorum =

Marian antiphon

"Ave Regina caelorum" is one of the Marian antiphons said or sung in the Liturgy of the Hours at the close of compline. In the Roman Breviary as revised by Pope Pius V in 1569 it was assigned for this use from compline of 2 February until compline of Wednesday of Holy Week. Since the revision of the Liturgy of the Hours in 1969, the only Marian antiphon for whose use a fixed period is laid down is the Easter season antiphon Regina caeli.

Like the other Marian antiphons, Ave Regina caelorum has been set to polyphonic music by composers such as Leonel Power (d. 1445), Guillaume Du Fay (d. 1474), Tomás Luis de Victoria (1548-1611), Marc-Antoine Charpentier, 3 settings, H.22, H.19, H. 45, Manuel de Sumaya (1678-1755), and Joseph Haydn (1732-1809).

The prayer, whose author is unknown, is found in manuscripts from the twelfth century onward.

== Text ==
The antiphon itself consists of two stanzas, each of four lines:

Latin

Ave, Regina cælorum,
Ave, Domina Angelorum:
Salve, radix, salve, porta
Ex qua mundo lux est orta:

Gaude, Virgo gloriosa,
Super omnes speciosa,
Vale, o valde decora,
Et pro nobis Christum exora.

English 1

Hail, O Queen of Heaven.
Hail, O Lady of Angels
Hail! thou root, hail! thou gate
From whom unto the world a light has arisen:

Rejoice, O glorious Virgin,
Lovely beyond all others,
Farewell, most beautiful maiden,
And pray for us to Christ.

Compline, as revised in 1969 after the Second Vatican Council, ends with the antiphon alone. In the earlier Roman Breviary the following versicle and the following prayer are added to the antiphon:

Latin

℣. Dignare me laudare te, Virgo sacrata.
℟. Da mihi virtutem contra hostes tuos.
Oremus.

Concede, misericors Deus, fragilitati nostrae præsidium: ut, qui sanctæ Dei Genetricis memoriam agimus; intercessionis eius auxilio, a nostris iniquitatibus resurgamus. Per Christum Dominum nostrum. ℟. Amen.

English 1

℣. Vouchsafe that I may praise thee, O sacred Virgin.
℟. Give me strength against thine enemies.
Let us pray

We beseech thee, O Lord, mercifully to assist our infirmity: that like as we do now commemorate Blessed Mary Ever-Virgin, Mother of God; so by the help of her intercession we may die to our former sins and rise again to newness of life. Through Christ our Lord. ℟. Amen.

English 2

℣. Allow me to praise thee, O sacred Virgin.
℟. Against thy enemies give me strength.
Let us pray.

Grant unto us, O merciful God, a defense against our weakness, that we who remember the holy Mother of God, by the help of her intercession, may rise from our iniquities, through Christ our Lord. ℟. Amen.

== Musical settings ==
Marc-Antoine Charpentier has composed one Ave Regina coelorum H.19, for 3 voices and bc (1670) and one Ave Regina coelorum H.45 (1690) for soloists, chorus, 2 violins and bc.

Manuel de Sumaya also composed an Ave Regina Caelorum, but instead written for 4 voices (SATB).

== See also ==
- Alma Redemptoris Mater
- Regina caeli
- Queen of Heaven
- Salve Regina
- The Glories of Mary
