= Litany of the Blessed Virgin Mary =

Catholic prayer

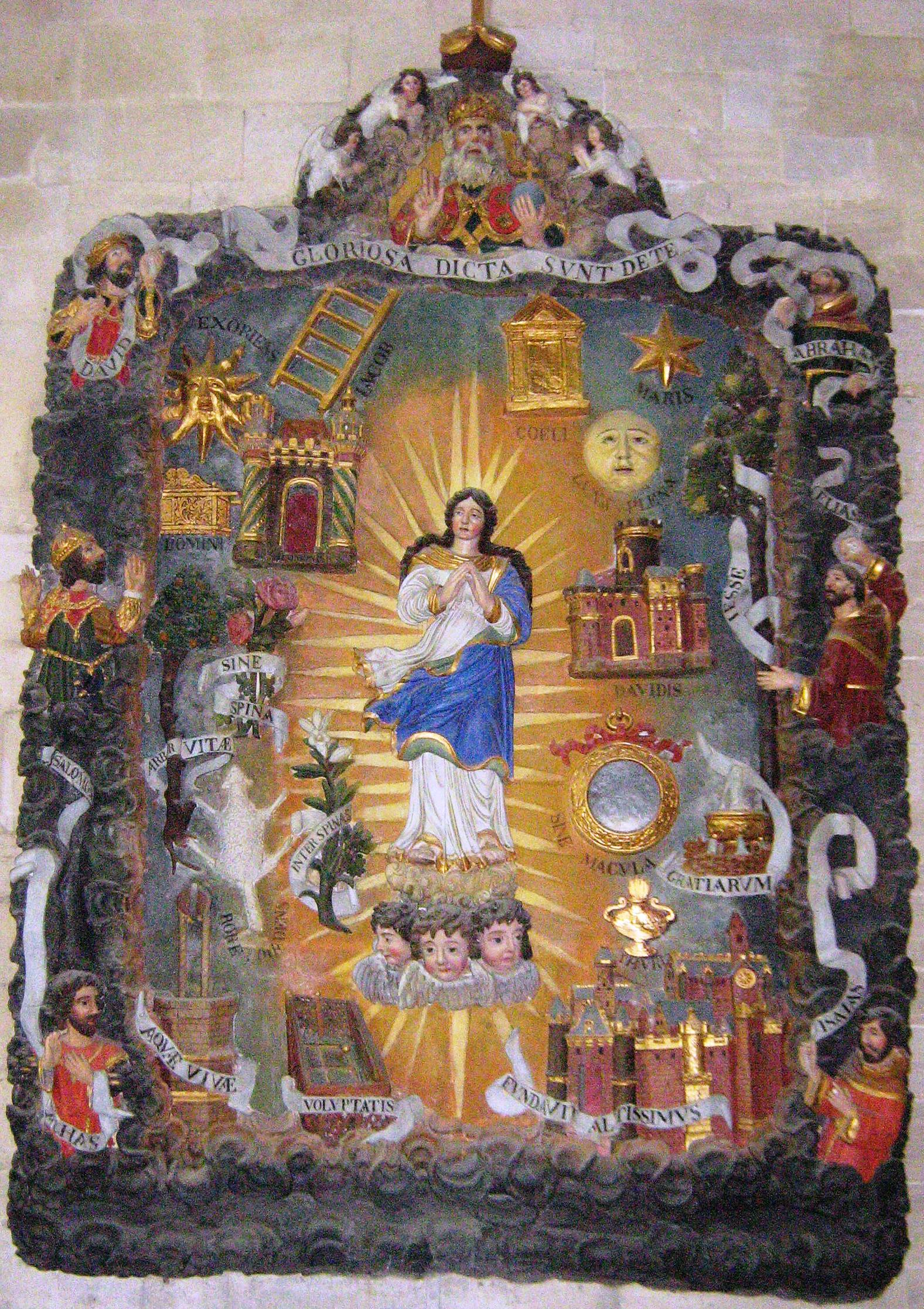
Fresco of Mary with symbols of the Litany of Loreto in Bayeux Cathedral

The Litany of the Blessed Virgin Mary is a Marian litany originally approved in 1587 by Pope Sixtus V. It is also known as the Litany of Loreto (Latin: Litaniae lauretanae), after its first-known place of origin, the Shrine of Our Lady of Loreto in Italy, where its usage was recorded as early as 1558.

The litany contains many of the titles used formally and informally for the Virgin Mary, and would often be recited as a call and response chant in a group setting. They are used to recite or sing at the end of the Rosary, and as a separate act of Marian devotion. In the latter case, for example, they can form the main element of a celebration of prayer to the Virgin Mary, be a processional song, or form part of a celebration of the Word of God.

A partial indulgence is granted to those who recite this litany.

== Background ==
According to Directory on Popular Piety:

Litanies are to be found among the prayers to the Blessed Virgin recommended by the Magisterium. These consist in a long series of invocations of Our Lady, which follow in a uniform rhythm, thereby creating a stream of prayer characterized by insistent praise and supplication. The invocations, generally very short, have two parts: the first of praise (Virgo clemens), the other of supplication (Ora pro nobis). The liturgical books contain two Marian litanies: The Litany of Loreto, repeatedly recommended by the Roman Pontiffs; and the Litany for the Coronation of Images of the Blessed Virgin Mary, which can be an appropriate substitute for the other litany on certain occasions. ...The Litanies are independent acts of worship. They are important acts of homage to the Blessed Virgin Mary, or as processional elements, or form part of a celebration of the Word of God or of other acts of worship.

== Form ==
In form, the Litany of Loreto is based on a fixed plan common to several Marian litanies already in existence during the second half of the 15th century, which in turn are connected to a notable series of Marian litanies that began to appear in the 12th century that multiplied in the 13th and 14th. The Loreto text was adopted in the shrine, and thus become known more than any other, to the many pilgrims who flocked there during the 16th century. The text was spread across Christendom, and eventually received ecclesiastical sanction.

Twelve invocations refer to Mary as Mother; six extol her as Virgin. Thirteen titles are derived from the Old Testament, followed by four calling on her as helper and advocate. The last thirteen name Mary as Queen. In June 2020, Pope Francis added three new invocations to the litany: "Mother of Mercy" (after Mother of the Church), "Mother of hope" (after Mother of Divine Grace), and "Solace of Migrants" (after Refuge of Sinners). This makes fourteen invocations referring to Mary as mother and five as advocate.

A litany is prayed like this: first an invocation is said by the prayer leader followed by the response, "Pray for us".

== The Litany ==
The Litany of the Blessed Virgin Mary was translated in the English form as:

Latin text	Literal English translation
Kyrie, eleison. ℟. Kyrie, eleison. Christe, eleison. ℟. Christe, eleison. Kyrie, eleison. ℟. Kyrie, eleison. Christe, audi nos. ℟. Christe, audi nos. Christe, exaudi nos. ℟. Christe, exaudi nos. Pater de caelis, Deus, ℟. miserere nobis. Fili, Redemptor mundi, Deus, ℟. miserere nobis. Spiritus Sancte, Deus, ℟. miserere nobis. Sancta Trinitas, unus Deus, ℟. miserere nobis. Sancta Maria, ℟, ora pro nobis. Sancta Dei Genitrix, ℟ ora pro nobis. Sancta Virgo virginum, ℟ ora pro nobis. Mater Christi, ℟ ora pro nobis. Mater Ecclesiae, ℟ ora pro nobis Mater misericordiae, ℟ ora pro nobis. Mater divinae gratiae, ℟ ora pro nobis. Mater spei, ℟ ora pro nobis. Mater purissima, ℟ ora pro nobis. Mater castissima, ℟ ora pro nobis. Mater inviolata, ℟ ora pro nobis. Mater intemerata, ℟ ora pro nobis. Mater amabilis, ℟ ora pro nobis Mater admirabilis, ℟ ora pro nobis. Mater boni consilii, ℟ ora pro nobis. Mater Creatoris, ℟ ora pro nobis. Mater Salvatoris, ℟ ora pro nobis. Virgo prudentissima, ℟ ora pro nobis. Virgo veneranda, ℟ ora pro nobis. Virgo praedicanda, ℟ ora pro nobis. Virgo potens, ℟ ora pro nobis. Virgo clemens, ℟ ora pro nobis. Virgo fidelis, ℟ ora pro nobis. Speculum iustitiae, ℟ ora pro nobis. Sedes sapientiae, ℟ ora pro nobis. Causa nostrae laetitiae, ℟ ora pro nobis. Vas spirituale, ℟ ora pro nobis. Vas honorabile, ℟ ora pro nobis. Vas insigne devotionis, ℟ ora pro nobis. Rosa mystica, ℟ ora pro nobis. Turris Davidica, ℟ ora pro nobis. Turris eburnea, ℟ ora pro nobis. Domus aurea, ℟ ora pro nobis. Foederis arca, ℟ ora pro nobis. Ianua coeli, ℟ ora pro nobis. Stella matutina, ℟ ora pro nobis. Salus infirmorum, ℟ ora pro nobis. Refugium peccatorum, ℟ ora pro nobis. Solacium migrantium, ℟ ora pro nobis. Consolatrix afflictorum, ℟ ora pro nobis. Auxilium Christianorum, ℟ ora pro nobis. Regina Angelorum, ℟ ora pro nobis. Regina Patriarcharum, ℟ ora pro nobis. Regina Prophetarum, ℟ ora pro nobis. Regina Apostolorum, ℟ ora pro nobis. Regina Martyrum, ℟ ora pro nobis. Regina Confessorum, ℟ ora pro nobis. Regina Virginum, ℟ ora pro nobis. Regina Sanctorum omnium, ℟ ora pro nobis. Regina sine labe originali concepta, ℟ ora pro nobis. Regina in caelum assumpta, ℟ ora pro nobis. Regina sacratissimi Rosarii, ℟ ora pro nobis. Regina familiae, ℟ ora pro nobis. Regina pacis, ℟ ora pro nobis. Agnus Dei, qui tollis peccata mundi, ℟ parce nobis, Domine. Agnus Dei, qui tollis peccata mundi, ℟ exaudi nos, Domine. Agnus Dei, qui tollis peccata mundi, ℟ miserere nobis.	Lord, have mercy on us. ℟ Lord, have mercy on us. Christ, have mercy on us. ℟ Christ, have mercy on us. Lord, have mercy on us. ℟ Lord, have mercy on us. Christ, hear us. ℟ Christ, hear us. Christ, graciously hear us. ℟ Christ, graciously hear us. God the Father of Heaven, ℟ Have mercy on us. God the Son, Redeemer of the world, ℟ Have mercy on us. God the Holy Ghost, ℟ Have mercy on us. Holy Trinity, one God, ℟ Have mercy on us. Holy Mary, ℟ pray for us. Holy Mother of God, ℟ pray for us. Holy Virgin of virgins, ℟ pray for us. Mother of Christ, ℟ pray for us. Mother of the Church, ℟ pray for us. Mother of Mercy, ℟ pray for us. Mother of divine grace, ℟ pray for us. Mother of Hope, ℟ pray for us. Mother most pure, ℟ pray for us. Mother most chaste, ℟ pray for us. Mother inviolate, ℟ pray for us. Mother undefiled, ℟ pray for us. Mother most amiable, ℟ pray for us. Mother most admirable, ℟ pray for us. Mother of good counsel, ℟ pray for us. Mother of our Creator, ℟ pray for us. Mother of our Savior, ℟ pray for us. Virgin most prudent, ℟ pray for us. Virgin most venerable, ℟ pray for us. Virgin most renowned, ℟ pray for us. Virgin most powerful, ℟ pray for us. Virgin most merciful, ℟ pray for us. Virgin most faithful, ℟ pray for us. Mirror of justice, ℟ pray for us. Seat of wisdom, ℟ pray for us. Cause of our joy, ℟ pray for us. Spiritual vessel, ℟ pray for us. Vessel of honor, ℟ pray for us. Singular vessel of devotion, ℟ pray for us. Mystical rose, ℟ pray for us. Tower of David, ℟ pray for us. Tower of ivory, ℟ pray for us. House of gold, ℟ pray for us. Ark of the Covenant, ℟ pray for us. Gate of Heaven, ℟ pray for us. Morning star, ℟ pray for us. Health of the sick, ℟ pray for us. Refuge of sinners, ℟ pray for us. Solace of Migrants, ℟ pray for us. Comforter of the afflicted, ℟ pray for us. Help of Christians, ℟ pray for us. Queen of angels, ℟ pray for us. Queen of patriarchs, ℟ pray for us. Queen of prophets, ℟ pray for us. Queen of apostles, ℟ pray for us. Queen of martyrs, ℟ pray for us. Queen of confessors, ℟ pray for us. Queen of virgins, ℟ pray for us. Queen of all saints, ℟ pray for us. Queen conceived without Original Sin, ℟ pray for us. Queen assumed into Heaven, ℟ pray for us. Queen of the most holy Rosary, ℟ pray for us. Queen of families, ℟ pray for us. Queen of peace, ℟ pray for us. Lamb of God, who takes away the sins of the world, ℟ Spare us, O Lord. Lamb of God, who takes away the sins of the world, ℟ Graciously hear us, O Lord. Lamb of God, who takes away the sins of the world, ℟ Have mercy on us.

The subsequent oration is:

Pray for us, O Holy Mother of God, ℟ That we may be made worthy of the promises of Christ.
Grant, we beseech Thee, O Lord God, that we Thy Servants may enjoy perpetual health of mind and body and by the glorious intercession of the Blessed Mary, ever Virgin, be delivered from present sorrow and enjoy eternal happiness. Through Christ Our Lord. Amen.

== History ==
=== Origins ===
There is a great lack of documentary evidence concerning the origin of the Litany of Loreto, the growth and development of the litany into the forms under which it is known, and as it was for the first time definitely approved by the Catholic Church in 1587. Some writers declare that they know nothing of its origin and history; others trace it back to the translation of the Holy House (1294); others, to Pope Sergius I (687); others, again, to Gregory the Great or to the 5th century; while others go as far back as the Early Church, and even the Apostolic Age. Historical criticism posits it to have been composed during the early 16th century or the end of the 15th. Before that time, there were litanies of Mary - one in Gaelic, probably of the eighth century, and others of later date, in which the invocations were much longer than those in the Litany of Loreto. For others, the first formularies of Marian litanies are documented from the second half of the 12th century and derive from the development of the Marian core of the Litany of the saints, which originated in the early 3rd century.

The oldest formulary from which the litanies that took the name Lauretane from the Shrine of the Holy House of Loreto, where they were sung at the beginning of the 16th century, derive is a manuscript codex in the National Library of France that contains 73 invocations, including Flos virginitatis (“Flower of virginity”), Forma sanctitatis (“Model of sanctity”), Hymnus cælorum (“Hymn of Heaven”), Luctus infernorum (“Mourning of Hell”), in addition to the invocations currently in use.

The 66 Marian invocations in the Parisian text cited above already have the structure of the Loreto litanies, and are arranged similarly. It begins with three invocations taken from the Litany of the Saints (Sancta Maria, Sancta Dei Genitrix, Sancta Virgo Virginum), followed by eleven invocations in which Mary is called “Mother” (Latin: Mater), then four invocations of her as “Teacher” (Magistra) which have since disappeared, eight invocations addressing Mary as “Virgin” (Virgo), then twenty-six symbolic titles of basically Biblical origin, and finally thirteen invocations to Mary as “Queen” (Regina). The various titles under which Mary was invoked derive from liturgical texts, contemporary authors, and homilies from the time of Charlemagne, with links to older texts: John Geometres (10th century), Venantius Fortunatus (c. 530-660), the hymn Akathist, Ephrem the Syrian (c. 306-372).

The oldest printed copy hitherto discovered is that of Dillingen in Germany, dating to 1558, entitled Letania Loretana. Ordnung der Letaney von unser lieben Frawen wie sie zu Loreto alle Samstag gehalten ("Order of the Litany of Our Lady as said every Saturday at Loreto"). It is fairly certain to be a copy of an earlier document, but thus far, the oldest known Italian copy dates from 1576. This version of the Litany was probably published and circulated in Germany by Saint Petrus Canisius. The text is just the same as the present one, except for having Mater piissima and Mater mirabilis, where now are Mater purissima and Mater admirabilis. The invocations Mater creatoris and Mater salvatoris are wanting, though this must be due to some editorial oversight since they are found in every manuscript of this group; on the other hand, the Auxilium christianorum is introduced though it does not occur in the other texts. Pope Pius V could not have introduced the invocation Auxilium christianorum in 1571 after the Battle of Lepanto, as stated in the sixth lesson of the Roman Breviary for the Feast of Mary, Help of Christians (24 May), and to this conclusion the Dillingen text adds indisputable evidence.

== Development ==
Pope Pius V by Motu Proprio of 20 March 1571, published 5 April, had suppressed all existing offices of the Virgin Mary, disapproving in general all the prayers therein, and substituting a new Officium B. Virginis without those prayers and consequently without any litany. It would seem that this action on the part of the pope led the clergy of Loreto to fear that the text of their litany was likewise prohibited. At all events, in order to keep the old custom of singing the litany every Saturday in honor of the Virgin, a new text was written containing praises drawn directly from Scriptures and usually applied to the Virgin in liturgies. This new litany was set to music by the choirmaster of the Basilica of Loreto, Costanzo Porta, and printed at Venice in 1575. It is the earliest setting to music of a Marian litany that we know of. In the following year (1576) these Scriptural litanies were printed for the use of pilgrims.

On 5 February 1578, the archdeacon of Loreto, Giulio Candiotti, sent to Pope Gregory XIII the "New praises or litanies of the most holy Virgin, drawn from Sacred Scripture", with Porta's music, expressing the wish that the pope would cause it to be sung in Saint Peter's Basilica and in other churches as was the custom at Loreto. The pope's reply is unknown, but we have the opinion of the theologian to whom the matter was referred, in which the composition of the new litany is praised, but which does not judge it opportune to introduce it into Rome or into church use on the authority of the pope, all the more because Pius V "in reforming the Little Office of the Blessed Virgin completely abolished, among other things, some similar litanies of the Blessed Virgin which existed in the old office. The judgment concluded that the litany might be sung at Loreto as a devotion proper to this shrine, and if others wanted to adopt it they might do so by way of private devotion.

This attempt having failed, the Scriptural litany straightway began to lose favor, and the Loreto text was revived. In another manual for pilgrims, published in 1578, the Scriptural litany is omitted, and the old Loreto text appears. The Loreto text was introduced elsewhere, and even reached Rome, when Pope Sixtus V, who had entertained a singular devotion for Loreto, by the Bull Reddituri of 11 July 1587, gave formal approval to it, as to the Litany of the Holy Name of Jesus, and recommended preachers everywhere to propagate its use among the faithful.

On the strength of this impulse given to the Litany of Loreto, certain ascetical writers began to publish a great number of litanies in honour of the Saviour, the Virgin, and the saints, often ill-advised and containing expressions theologically heterodox, so Pope Clement VIII had promulgated (6 Sept., 1601) a severe decree of the Holy Office, which, while upholding the litanies contained in the liturgical books as well as the Litany of Loreto, banned the publication of new litanies, or use of those already published in public worship, without the approbation of the Congregation of Rites.

In Rome, the Litany of Loreto was introduced into the Basilica di Santa Maria Maggiore by Cardinal Francesco Toledo in 1597; and in 1613, Pope Paul V ordered it to be sung in that church, morning and evening, on Saturdays and on vigils and feasts of the Madonna. As a result of this example, the Loreto Litany began to be used, and is still largely used, in all the churches of Rome. The Dominicans, in their general chapter held at Bologna in 1615, ordered its recitation in all the convents of their Order after the Office on Saturdays at the end of the customary "Salve Regina". The Litany of Loreto was first included in the Rituale Romanum in 1874, as an appendix.

== Additions ==
- The Dominicans caused the invocation Regina sacratissimi rosarii ("Queen of the Most Holy Rosary") to be inserted in the litany, and it appears in print for the first time in a Dominican Breviary dated 1614, as has been pointed out by Father Walsh, O.P., in The Tablet, 24 October 1908. Although by decree of 1631, and by Bull of Pope Alexander VII (1664), it was strictly forbidden to make any additions to the litanies, another decree of the Congregation of Rites, dated 1675, permitted the Confraternity of the Rosary to add the invocation Regina sacratissimi rosarii, and this was prescribed for the whole Church by Pope Leo XIII on 24 December 1883.
- The invocation Queen of All saints was added by Pope Pius VII when he returned to Rome after his long imprisonment by order of Napoleon.
- In 1766 Clement XIII granted Spain the privilege of adding after "Mater intemerata" the invocation Mater immaculata, which is still customary in Spain, notwithstanding the addition of Regina sine labe originali concepta. This last invocation was originally granted by Pope Pius IX to the Bishop of Mechelen in 1846, and, after the definition of the Immaculate Conception (1854), the Congregation by various rescripts authorized many dioceses to make a like addition, so that in a short time it became the universal practice. The title Queen conceived without original sin was granted by Pope Gregory XVI (1831-1846) from 1839 to certain dioceses; Pius IX (1846-1878) granted it in 1846 to the archdiocese of Malines and, after the definition of the dogma of the Immaculate Conception (8 December 1854), the Sacred Congregation of Rites with various rescripts authorised many dioceses to make the addition, so that in a short time it became universal practice (the addition did not become obligatory during the pontificate of Pope Pius IX, so much so that it is indicated as optional for dioceses that obtained an apostolic indult in the Rituale Romanum of 1881
- By decree of 22 April 1903, Pope Leo XIII added the invocation "Mater boni consilii" (Mother of Good Counsel), which, under the form of Mater veri consilii, was contained in the Marian litany used for centuries in St Mark's Basilica, Venice.
- The addition Queen of peace was ordered by Pope Benedict XV in 1916.
- In 1950, Pope Pius XII added Queen assumed into heaven.
- In 1980, Pope John Paul II added Mother of the church. The invocation Queen of families was added on 31 December 1995, also by Pope John Paul II.
- On 20 June 2020, during the Feast of the Immaculate Heart of Mary, Pope Francis added three invocations: Mother of mercy, Mother of hope, and Solace of migrants.

== Indulgence ==
The 2004 Enchiridion Indulgentiarum grants a partial indulgence to the faithful who piously pray the litanies.

== Musical settings ==
- Tomás Luis de Victoria, Litanies de la Vierge for two Chorus.
- Palestrina, 11 Litanies de la Vierge for 3,, 4, 5, and 8 voices.
- Thomas Tallis, Laetania, for 5 voices
- William Byrd, Laetania, for 4 voices
- Alessandro Grandi, Litaniae Beatae Mariae Virginis, for 5 voices (1614)
- Paul Damance, Les Litanies de la Saint Vierge. (1707).
- Jan Dismas Zelenka, 10 Litanies ZWV 147–157.
- Johann Stamitz (1717-1757), Litaniae Lauretanae en do majeur pour voix seule, chœur et orchestre.
- Michel-Richard de Lalande, Litanies de la Saint Vierge à quatre parties, (music lost).
- Marc-Antoine Charpentier : 9 Litanies de La Vierge Marie :
  - H.82, for 3 voices and continuo;
  - H.83, for 6 voices and 2 treble viols;
  - H.84, for 3 voices, 2 treble instruments, and continuo;
  - H.85, for soloists, chorus, flutes, strings, and continuo;
  - H.86, for 3 voices and continuo;
  - H.87, for soloists, chorus and continuo;
  - H.88, for soloists, chorus, and continuo;
  - H.89, for soloists, chorus, and continuo;
  - H.90, for soloists, chorus, and continuo. ( 1680 - 1690).
- Henry Du Mont, Les Litanies de la Vierge for 5 voices and continuo (1657), livre second.
- Paolo Lorenzani, Les Litanies à la Vierge, for 4 voices and continuo (after 1694)
- František Tůma, 20 Litanies de la Vierge Marie
- Charles d'Ambleville, Litanies de la Vierge.
- Jean-Baptiste Geoffroy, 4 Litanies de la Sainte Vierge.
- Wolfgang Amadeus Mozart : Litaniae Lauretanae KV 109 and KV 195.
- Joseph Haydn, 12 Litanies; (7 en do, Hob. XXIIIc2, 3, 4, 16, 17, 18, and 20; 2 en ré. Hob. XXIIId 6 & 7; 2 en fa. Hob. XXIIIf3 & 4; 1 en sol. Hob.XIIIg2).
- Luigi Cherubini, Litanies de la Vierge, for chorus (4 voices) and orchestra (1820)
- Charles Gounod, Litanies de la Sainte Vierge, for mixed chorus and organ. (1888)
- César Franck, Litanies de la Sainte Vierge, for 4 voices and organ (1888)
- Jules Massenet, Litanies de la Sainte Vierge, for chorus, organ or harmonium (1888)
- Ernest Reyer, Litanies de la Sainte Vierge, for 3 or 4 voices (1888)
- Ambroise Thomas, Litanies de la sainte Vierge , for 3 or 4 voices (1888)
- Alexandre Guilmant, 5 litanies en l'honneur de le Bienheureuse Vierge Marie, for 1, 2, 3 or 4 voices and organ or harmonium (1877)
- Léo Delibes, Litanies de la Sainte Vierge, pour choeur à 4 voix mixtes et orgue ou harmonium (1867)
- Simon Mayr, Litaniae Lauretanae in A major.
- Francis Poulenc, Litanies à la Vierge Noire (1936).
- Camille Saint-Saëns, Litanies à la Sainte Vierge pour soliste et orgue (1917).
- Joseph Auer, Lauretanische Litanei (1890).
- Johannes Habert, Lauretanische Litanei in A dur, N°2" (1877).
- Jehan Alain, Litanies for organ, opus 119A (1939)
- Sergio Antonio del Rio, Litanei zur Muttergottes (1998).
- Gilbert Amy, Litanies pour Ronchamp (2005)
- Thierry Escaich, Litanies pour un jubilé (2015)

Croats have several different folk musical settings (tunes) of litanies (in Herzegovina, Solin etc.).

== See also ==
- Marian devotions
- Marian litany
- Titles of Mary
