= Hymns to Mary =

Christian hymns focused on Mary, mother of Jesus

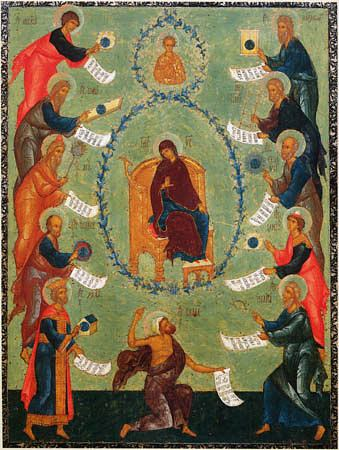
Eastern Orthodox icon of the Praises of the Theotokos, before which the Akathist hymn to Mary may be chanted

Marian hymns are Christian songs focused on Mary, mother of Jesus. They are used in devotional and liturgical services, particularly by the Catholic, Eastern Orthodox, Oriental Orthodox, and Anglican churches.

Some have been adopted as Christmas hymns. Marian hymns are not popular among the majority of low-church Protestant denominations, as a large portion of adherents to said churches see Marian devotion as idolatry.

The Eastern Orthodox yearly cycle of liturgy has more hymns to Mary than does the liturgy of Roman Catholicism, which often uses them in month-of-May devotions.

These liturgies include the Magnificat hymn, which is one of the eight most ancient Christian hymns—perhaps the earliest, according to historian Marjorie Reeves. It is named after its first word in the 4th-century Vulgate Bible, based on Luke 1:46–55, and is widely used by Roman Catholics, Anglicans, and the Eastern Orthodox.

Some Marian hymns are shared by different groups of Christians, or are influenced by other hymns. For instance, the second stanza of the Anglican hymn Ye Watchers and Ye Holy Ones is derived from the Eastern Orthodox hymn to the Theotokos.

Some Marian hymns—e.g., the Akathist to the Theotokos—reflect the Mariological approach of their historical period.

== Eastern Church ==
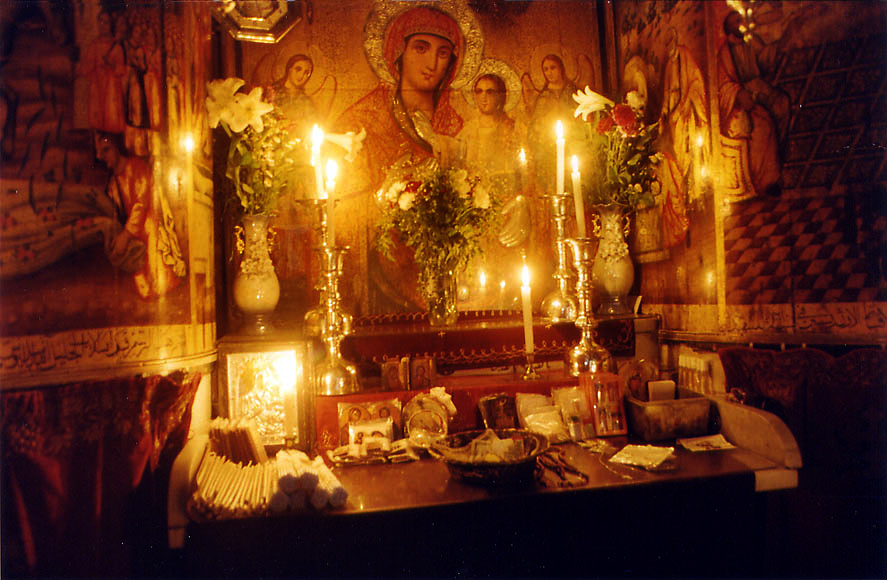
Coptic Marian altar at the Church of the Holy Sepulchre, Jerusalem

In the Eastern Church, the Theotokia (i.e. hymns to the Theotokos) are an essential part of the Divine Liturgy. The positioning of Marian hymns in the Orthodox liturgical services effectively places the Theotokos in the most prominent place after Christ, in that the Theotokia immediately follow the hymns that praise Christ. In the Theotokia people repeat the name Mary many times as a sign of their close friendship with her, and as an expression of the desire to call her by her name. Parts of the Axion Estin hymn date back to 8th-century (Cosmas of Maiuma).

In the Eastern Church, the Theotokia often include biblical references that emphasize the mystery of the Incarnation. These Marian hymns have been used in daily prayers since early Christianity (they became part of liturgy later) as a way to teach people the Orthodox beliefs, and to prepare them against ideas considered heresies. Marian hymns remain a key element in the liturgy of the Coptic Church and are included in every canonical hour, day and night.

The widely used Akathist Hymn (meaning the unseated hymn) to the Theotokos (Mother of God) is attributed to Saint Romanos the Melodist who composed many (perhaps several hundred) hymns to saints during the 6th century. The attribution is not supported by recent scholarship, but Romanos did make a vital contribution to the Marian poetry in Constantinople. In the Orthodox weekly liturgical cycle, Wednesday is dedicated to the Theotokos, and all daily services include numerous Marian hymns. These take precedence over the veneration of other saints and angels.

While the formations of the Divine Liturgy in the 6th and 7th centuries preceded the beginnings of the period of Byzantine Iconoclasm, it was perhaps during the 11th century that the Theotokia became part of the liturgical books of the Eastern Church. As of the 12th century an increasing number of diataxeis, giving the order of the liturgy included Marian hymns.

On Wednesdays and Fridays, the regular Theotokia are replaced with Stavrotheotokia, hymns in which the focus is less on the incarnation (although this imagery is still present) and more on the image of the Virgin Mary standing before the Cross.

By the 13th century, Triodion liturgical books were combining references to icon veneration within hymns, e.g. "...to those who honor your holy image, O reverend one, and with one accord proclaim you as the true Mother of God and faithfully venerate you". Centuries later, the Sunday of Orthodoxy continues to combine Marian hymns and the veneration of icons in a manner that confirms the identity of Mary as the Theotokos.

Hymns, feasts and miraculous Marian icons are now combined within Eastern church practices, e.g. the Akathistos to the "wonder working" Theotokos Iverskaya (which has a feast day as well). Marian hymns, litanies and the veneration or Benediction of the icons of Mary are combined in the Maronite Church's, Benediction of the icon of the Virgin Mary. Here a hymn litany includes the repetition of the phrase: "We petition you...". This Marionite hymn litany has two parts: first the giving of praise to Mary, then the petitions.

== Western Church ==
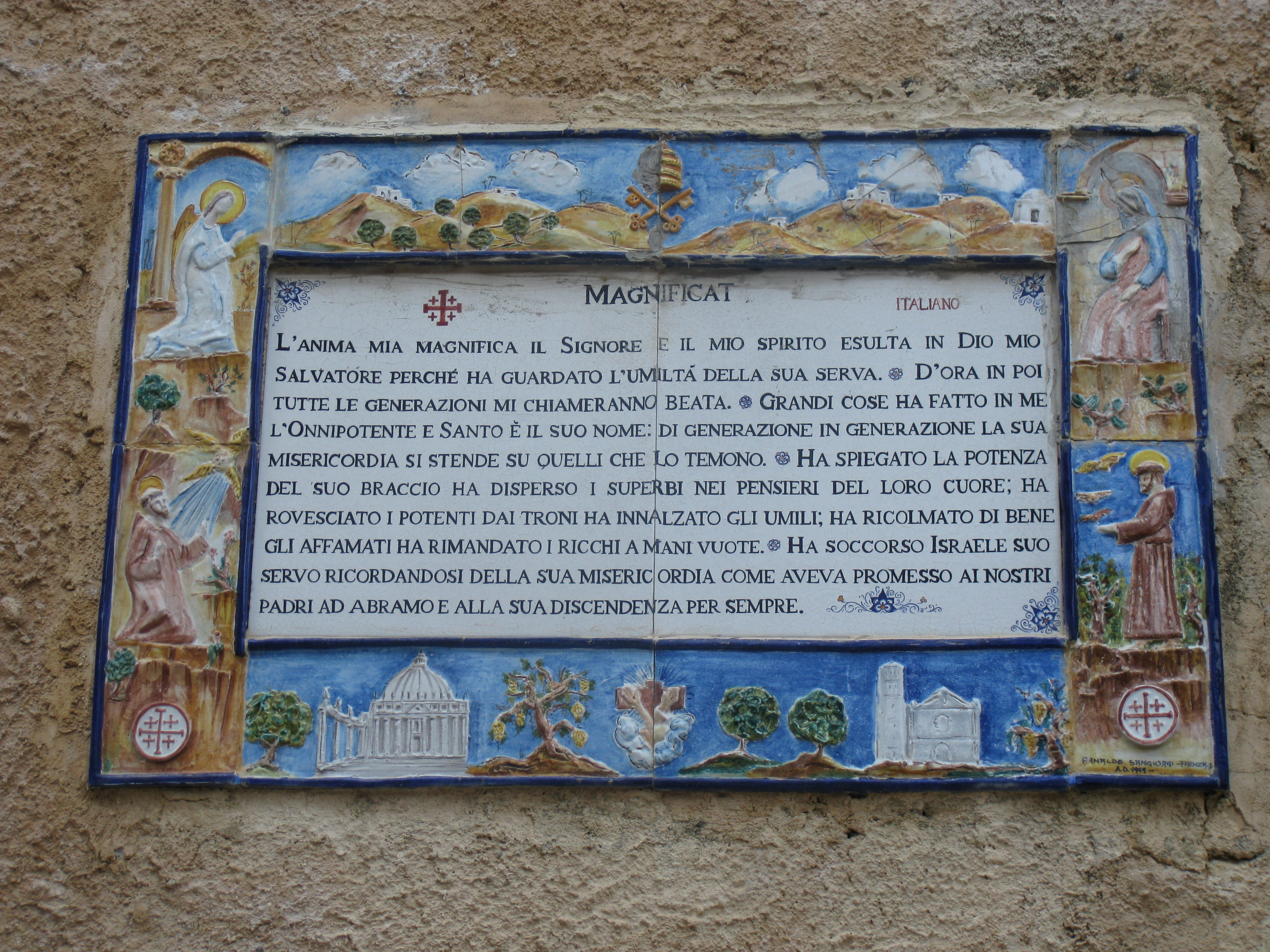
The Magnificat on the wall of the Church of the Visitation

According to Saint Augustine, it was Saint Ambrose who, in the 4th century, introduced the use of hymns outside the liturgy of the Western Church. By the 8th century, popular hymns such as Ave Maris Stella had appeared as plainsong in Vespers and many other hymns were later based on them. Hymns to Mary began to flourish with the growing veneration of the Virgin Mary in the 11th and 12th centuries, and the Ave Maria became well established.

Marian hymns in the Western Church grew even faster during the 13th century as the Franciscans began to compose a number of lasting hymns. Saint Francis began to improvise hymns of praise as he wandered the hills behind Assisi, begging for stones to restore the church of San Damiano. These developed into full hymns later. His Salutation to the Blessed Virgin Mary is a collection of greetings that form a litany of greetings to the Virgin Mary. Some of the most recognized hymns to Mary were composed by the followers of Francis of Assisi. Towards the end of the 13th century, the Franciscan Giacopone dei Todi, the author of Stabat Mater dolorosa, composed Stabat Mater Speciosa about the joy of the Virgin Mary. Based on the Gospel accounts of the Nativity of Jesus, this was one of the tenderest hymns and is often considered one of the seven greatest Latin hymns.

The 13th century growth of Marian devotions was also witnessed in France, with the construction of Marian churches such as Notre Dame de Paris and the introduction of liturgical material such as offices. In this time frame poets and trouvères such as Jaque de Cambrai introduced a new range of Marian poems which were not simply devotional texts that affirmed a religious point of view, but had specific melodic components that allowed them to be sung with ease. By the end of the 13th century, Marian hymns constituted the greatest number of texts in the Montpellier Codex, the largest and most comprehensive extant manuscript of 13th century music.

By the 14th century, the Llibre Vermell de Montserrat from the Spanish monastery of Santa Maria de Montserrat included hymns in Latin such as O Virgo Splendens ("O Splendid Virgin") and Laudemus Virginem ("Let us praise the Virgin").

While a number of well known hymns to Mary exist, many local and regional Marian devotions have also inspired hymns that continue to be used along with specific festivals around the world. For instance, Reina de Cavite (i.e. Queen of Cavite) was composed by the Jesuits in Cavite City Philippines around 1689, and continues to be performed to date in local festivals for Our Lady of Solitude of Porta Vaga.

Some hymns to Mary are also included in the Evangelical Lutheran Worship hymnal, e.g. hymn number 251 is "My Soul Proclaims Your Greatness", which is based on the Magnificat and hymn 419 is "For All the Faithful Women" in which the first stanza includes: "We honor faithful Mary, fair maiden, full of grace".

The Cantigas de Santa Maria are 420 poems with musical notation, written in the medieval Galician-Portuguese language during the reign of Alfonso X of Castile El Sabio (1221–1284).

=== Marian antiphons ===
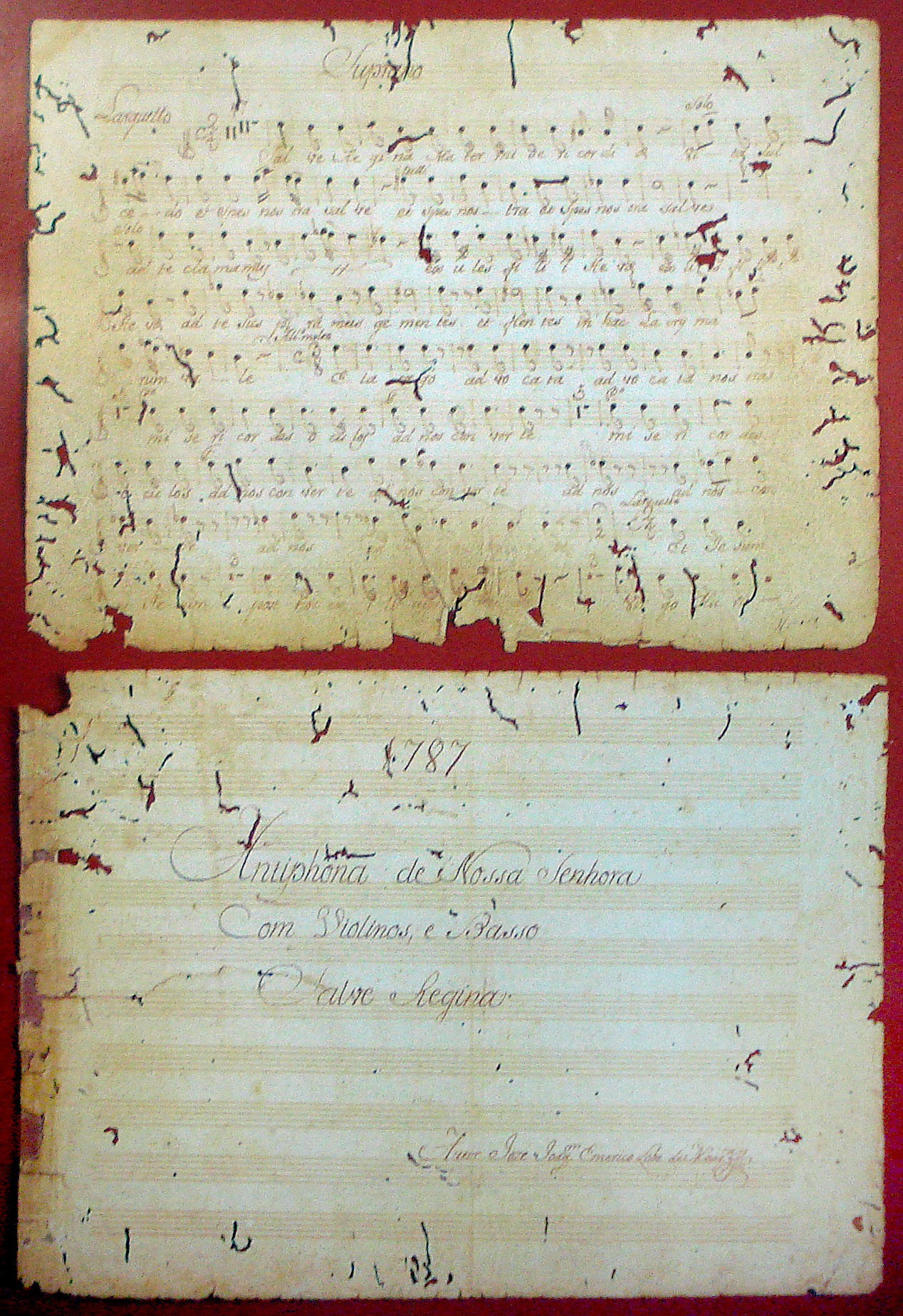
Salve Regina manuscript, 1787

Marian antiphons are a group of hymns in the Gregorian chant repertory of the Catholic Church, sung in honor of the Virgin Mary. Votive antiphons are not true antiphons in that they are not associated and chanted with a Psalm verse; they may be thought of, therefore, as "independent Latin songs". Votive antiphons were traditionally attached to the end of services to honor or appeal to local saints. Marian antiphons, which began to appear in the written record during the early eleventh century, are dedicated specifically to the Virgin Mary.

Modern Marian antiphons are sung primarily by Roman Catholics, particularly in religious communities after Compline. They are also used in Anglican communities where the traditional divine office is observed. Traditionally, they were also said after Lauds, and after each Canonical Hour when sung in choir, if the choir was then to disperse. These four antiphons were originally only performed in connection with psalms, but have been used as detached chants since 1239.

Although there were once a number of Marian antiphons, some of great antiquity, the majority of written examples in the English polyphonic style were destroyed during King Edward VI's reign following Henry VIII’s dissolution of the monasteries during the English Reformation. Edward and the Archbishop of Canterbury Thomas Cranmer pursued policies that purged churches, chapels, and monasteries of pre-Reformation liturgical music. The scholar Richard Taruskin notes "[it] was at Cranmer's instigation...that the notorious search-and-destroy missions against books of "Popish ditties"--particularly Marian votive antiphons--took place, thanks to which so little early English polyphony survives."

The repression included the destruction of many church organs due to their association with votive antiphons and other polyphonic music; English organ-building did not recover until the 17th century. Marian votive antiphons were barred from public performance in the established Church of England, and Cranmer worked with anti-Catholic composer John Merbecke to compose a new liturgy for the Church of England, which placed "strict limits...on the style of the music".

In the modern liturgy, only four Marian antiphons are used, and they are sung according to a seasonal calendar. The four hymns, which are usually referred to simply as "The Marian Antiphons" or "The Marian Anthems", have been used as detached chants since 1239:

- Alma Redemptoris Mater (Advent through Candlemas)
- Ave Regina caelorum (After Candlemas through Holy Saturday)
- Regina Caeli (Eastertide)
- Salve Regina (After Eastertide through None of the Saturday before Advent)

There have been exceptions to this schedule in different monastic traditions over the years, e.g. the Benedictine monasteries were using them in the 14th century. In current usage the liturgical year is divided into four periods, with each period associated with one of the four Marian antiphons, which is sung at the end of Compline or Vespers during that period. For example, Alma Redemptoris Mater is sung from the first Sunday in Advent until Candlemas (2 February).

The four Marian antiphons (with occasional variations in the text) are often set to polyphonic music for choir or as solo arias. The Gregorian melodies exist both in elaborate solemn forms and simple versions.

=== Other languages ===
While a number of Marian hymns are written in Latin and English, there are nine Marian hymns with German lyrics included in the 2013 Gotteslob:

- "Den Herren will ich loben" (I want to praise the Lord), 1954 text by Maria Luise Thurmair based on the Magnificat, to a 1613 melody by Melchior Teschner
- "Freu dich, du Himmelskönigin" (Be glad, you Queen of Heaven), for Eastertide, a paraphrase of the Latin Regina caeli, first published in 1600
- Gegrüßet seist du, Königin", a paraphrase of Salve Regina, first published in 1687
- "Lasst uns erfreuen herzlich sehr" (Let us rejoice most heartily), 1623 hymn tune, during the Easter season
- "Glauben können wie du" (Being able to believe like you), 2009 text by Helmut Schlegel, melody by Joachim Raabe
- "Maria, breit den Mantel aus" (Mary, spread out your cloak), first printed in 1640
- "Maria, dich lieben ist allzeit mein Sinn" (Mary, to love you is always on my mind), 18th century, rewritten by Friedrich Dürr in 1972
- "Maria durch ein Dornwald ging" (Maria walks amid the thorns), traditional Advent song
- "Segne du, Maria" (Bless, you, Mary), 1870 text by Cordula Wöhler, a melody by Karl Kindsmüller, published in 1916

== See also ==
- Gregorian Chant
- Marian devotions
- Marian litanies
- Mariology
- Roman Catholic hymns (list)
