= Salve Regina (Liszt) =

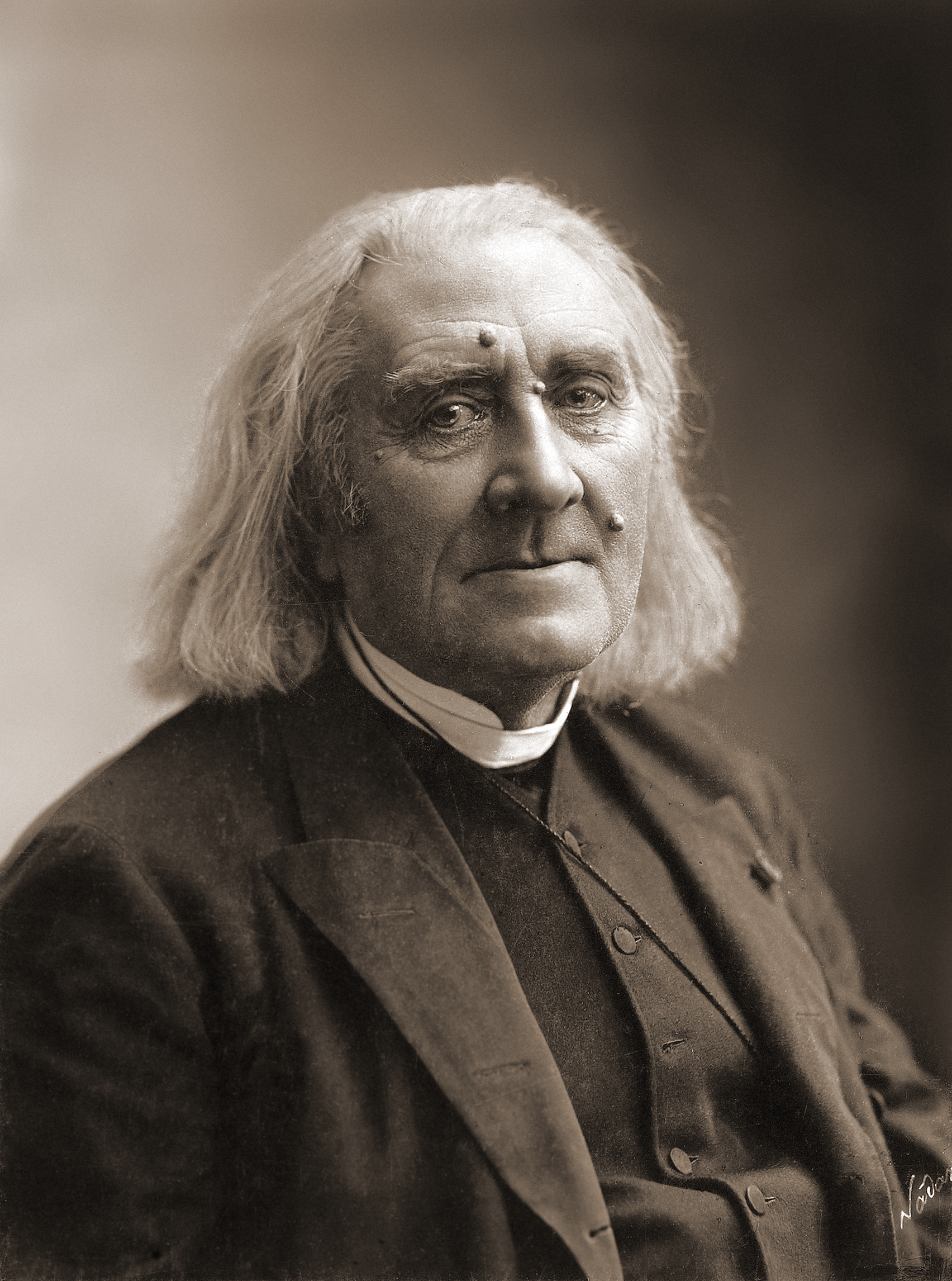
Franz Liszt in March 1886, four months before his death, photographed by Nadar

Salve Regina, S. 66, is a musical setting of the Salve Regina hymn composed by Franz Liszt in 1885. It is written for an a cappella SATB choir.

This is the only example of unaccompanied church music in Liszt's hand. It is also Liszt's last religious composition. Liszt had previously composed an organ version of the hymn in Zwei Kirchenhymnen, S. 669, in 1877.

Set in F major and common time, it is marked lento (slow) and is mostly marked piano (soft), with contrasts within this dynamic spectrum. The text contains the first line of the hymn, Salve, Regina, mater misericordiae, with repetitions.
