= Our Lady, Star of the Sea =

Invocation of Mary, Mother of Jesus, among other names and titles

Our Lady Star of the Sea
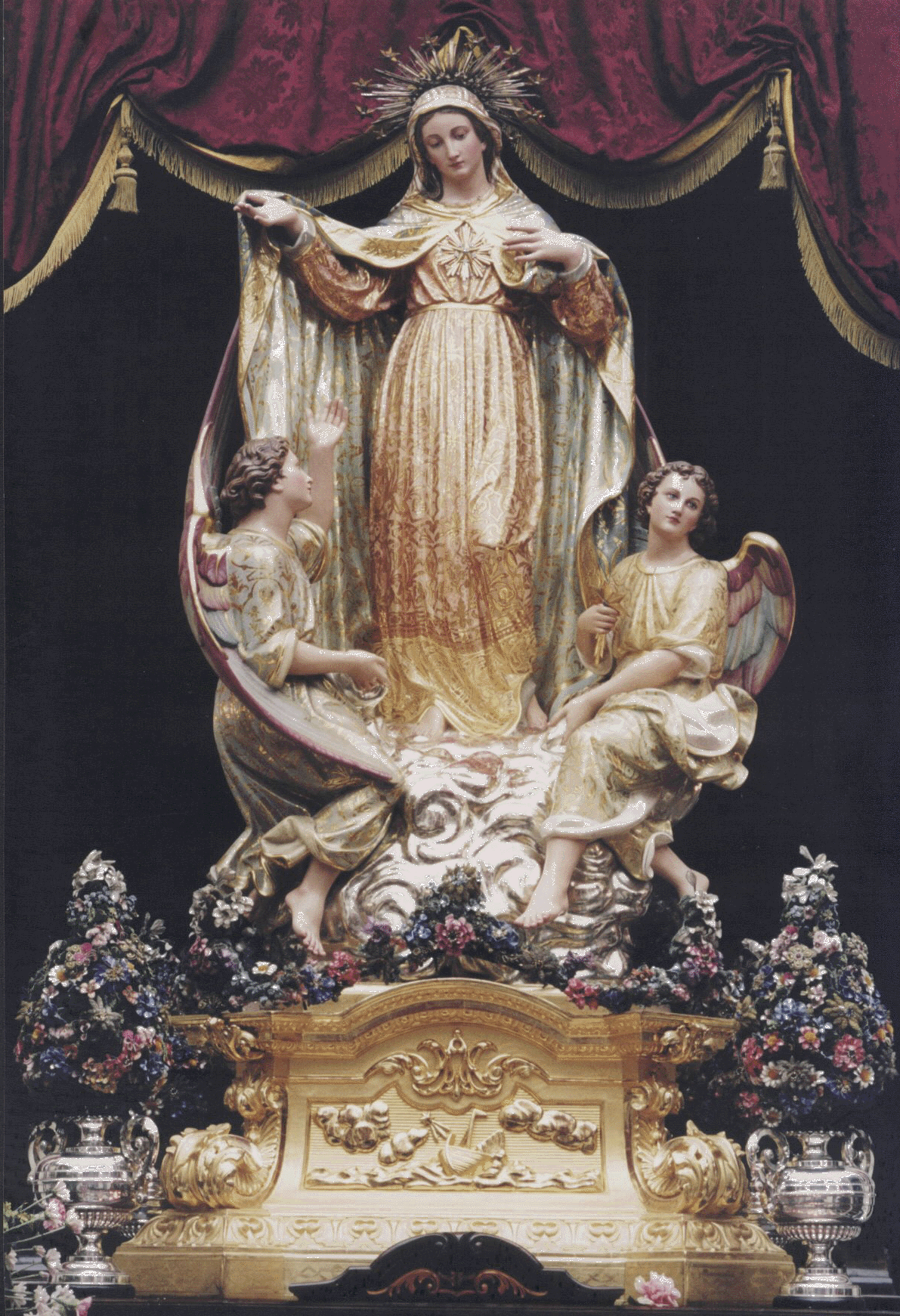
- A statue of Our Lady, Star of the Sea in Sliema, Malta
- Venerated in: Catholic Church; Anglican Communion
- Feast: 27 September (Apostleship of the Sea)
- Attributes: Mary with a star, standing over the ocean, holding a ship or an anchor
- Patronage: Seafarers, sailors, fishermen, the Apostleship of the Sea, travelers, Falkland Islands
- Symbolism & Origins

Etymology & History
- Latin Name: Stella Maris
- Earliest Source: St. Jerome (5th Century)
- Hymn: Ave Maris Stella
- Significance: Guide and protector of those at sea
- Major Shrine: Stella Maris Monastery, Haifa, Israel

Our Lady, Star of the Sea is an ancient title for Mary, the mother of Jesus. The words Star of the Sea are a translation of the Latin title Stella Maris.

The title has been in use since at least the early medieval period. Purportedly arising from a scribal error in a supposed etymology of the name Mary, it came to be seen as allegorical of Mary's role as "guiding star" on the way to Christ. Under this name, the Virgin Mary is believed to intercede as a guide and protector of seafarers in particular. Many coastal churches are named Stella Maris or Star of the Sea.

== Etymology and history ==
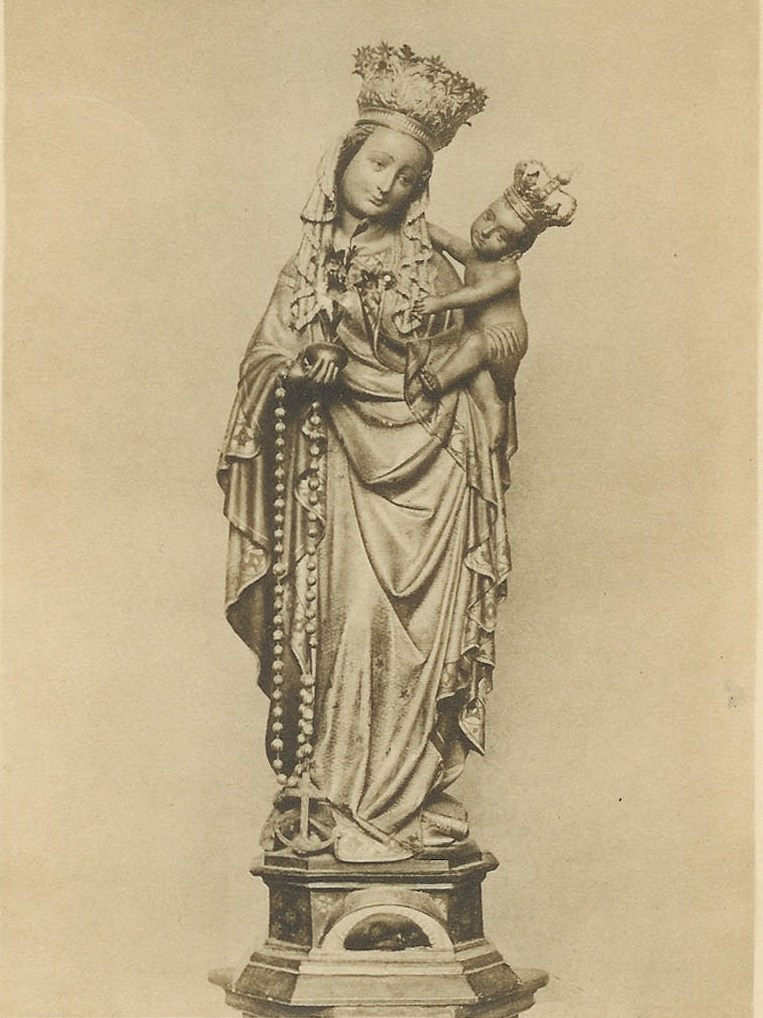
The miraculous statue of Our Lady, Star of the Sea in Basilica of Our Lady (Maastricht), the most important Marian shrine of the Netherlands

The name Stella Maris is first applied to the Virgin Mary in the Liber de Nominibus Hebraicis, a translation by Saint Jerome of a work by Philo, but this is apparently a misnomer based on a transcription error. The Hebrew name מרים (originally pronounced "Maryam") was rendered in Greek as Mariam (Μαριάμ). In most manuscripts of Jerome's work, one of the interpretations offered is as "stella maris", star of the sea. But this was probably originally stilla maris, meaning "drop of the sea" (as written in one manuscript), based on מר mar, a rare biblical word for "drop", (Note: Isaiah 40:15 is the only instance in the Hebrew Bible where it takes this meaning; Strong's Concordance H4752, from the root מרר "trickle" (H4843).) and ים yam "sea". It seems that at some later stage a copyist transcribed this as stella maris, "star of the sea", and this transcription error became widespread.

Another opinion states that Jerome himself interpreted the name as meaning "star of the sea" or Stella Maris, by relating it to a Hebrew word for star, מאור (ma'or), from the verb אור ('or), to be light or shine.

The etymologization of the name of Mary as "star of the sea" was widespread by the early medieval period. It is referenced in Isidore's Etymologiae (7th century). The plainsong hymn Ave Maris Stella ("Hail, Star of the Sea") dates from about the 8th century. Paschasius Radbertus in the 9th century has an allegorical explanation of the name, writing that Mary is the "Star of the Sea" to be followed on the way to Christ, "lest we capsize amid the storm-tossed waves of the sea."

In the medieval period, stella maris came to be used as a name of Polaris in its role as lodestar (guiding star, north star); it may have been used as such since Late Antiquity, as it is referred to as ἀειφανής "always visible" by Stobaeus in the 5th century, even though it was still some eight degrees removed from the celestial pole at that time.

In the twelfth century, Saint Bernard of Clairvaux wrote: "If the winds of temptation arise; if you are driven upon the rocks of tribulation look to the star, call on Mary. If you are tossed upon the waves of pride, of ambition, of envy, of rivalry, look to the star, call on Mary. Should anger, or avarice, or fleshly desire violently assail the frail vessel of your soul, look at the star, call upon Mary." Pope Pius XII, in his encyclical Doctor Mellifluus, also quoted Bernard of Clairvaux in saying: "Mary... is interpreted to mean 'Star of the Sea'. This admirably befits the Virgin Mother... (for) as the ray does not diminish the brightness of the star, so neither did the Child born of her tarnish the beauty of Mary's virginity."

Anthony of Padua also wrote of Mary as Star of the Sea.

Stella maris was occasionally also used in reference to Christ. Robert Bellarmine (writing c. 1600) deprecated this use of the title, preferring the allegory of Christ as the morning star as the "brightest star of all", classing the less-bright polar star as "paltry" (exigua).

== Devotional application ==
The idea of Mary as a guiding star for seafarers has led to devotion to Our Lady, Star of the Sea in many Catholic coastal and fishing communities. Numerous churches, schools and colleges are dedicated to "Stella Maris, Our Lady Star of the Sea", or "Mary, Star of the Sea".

Stella Maris Monastery, the foundation house of the Carmelite order, was established on Mount Carmel in Haifa in the early thirteenth century. The abbey was destroyed several times, but a refounded Stella Maris monastery is still considered the headquarters of the order.

Devotions to this title of Mary are found in the popular Catholic hymn, Hail Queen of Heaven, the Ocean Star and the ancient prayer Ave Maris Stella. The widely sung "Sicilian Mariners Hymn", O Sanctissima, also reflects this devotion, as do Tamil hymns.

=== Patronage ===
Our Lady, Star of the Sea is the patroness of the Netherlands, as well as the American state of Hawaii. The Catholic Church commemorates Our Lady, Star of the Sea on 27 September.

== Seafarers ==
The Apostleship of the Sea (AOS) is often known locally as Stella Maris, whom seafarers recognise for providing pastoral, practical and spiritual support via their port chaplains and ship visitors in ports around the world. Our Lady Star of the Sea is the patron of the AOS.

The Apostleship of the Sea has for many years now, been commemorating the Feast of Stella Maris, Our Lady, Star of the Sea, with Mass each year in September for seafarers. It is a day to pray for all seafarers and give thanks for their contribution to global trade. At a gathering during the Stella Maris Mass in Westminster Cathedral in 2016, Archbishop of Westminster Cardinal Vincent Nichols said, "Caring for seafarers is a profoundly Christian thing to do."

In the Philippines' historic Battles of La Naval de Manila, many believed that Mary's intercession caused the victory.

== Gallery ==
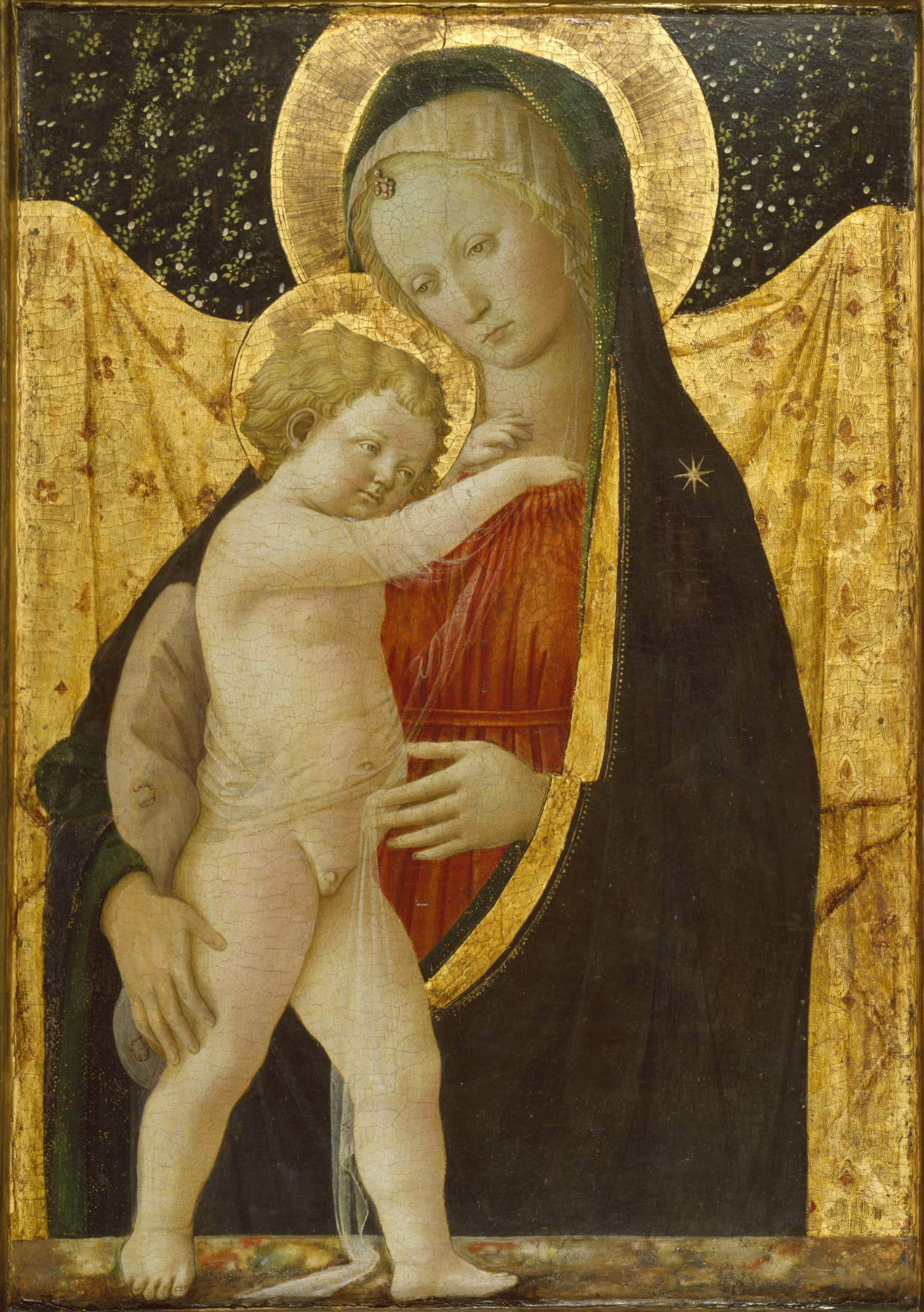
The star on Mary's robe alludes to her epithet of Stella Maris.

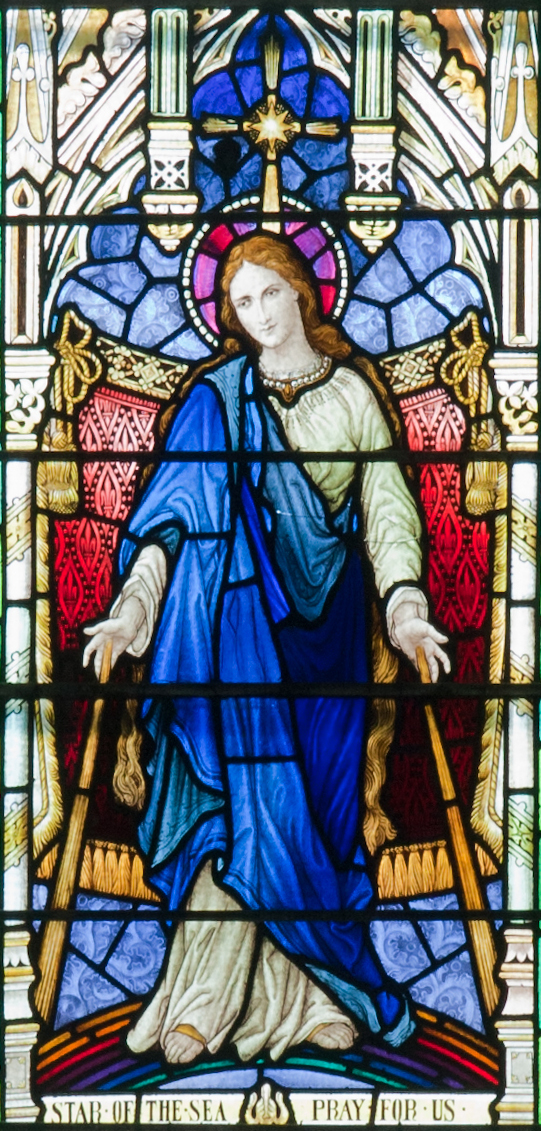
Our Lady, Star of the Sea, Goleen Church of Our Lady, Ireland

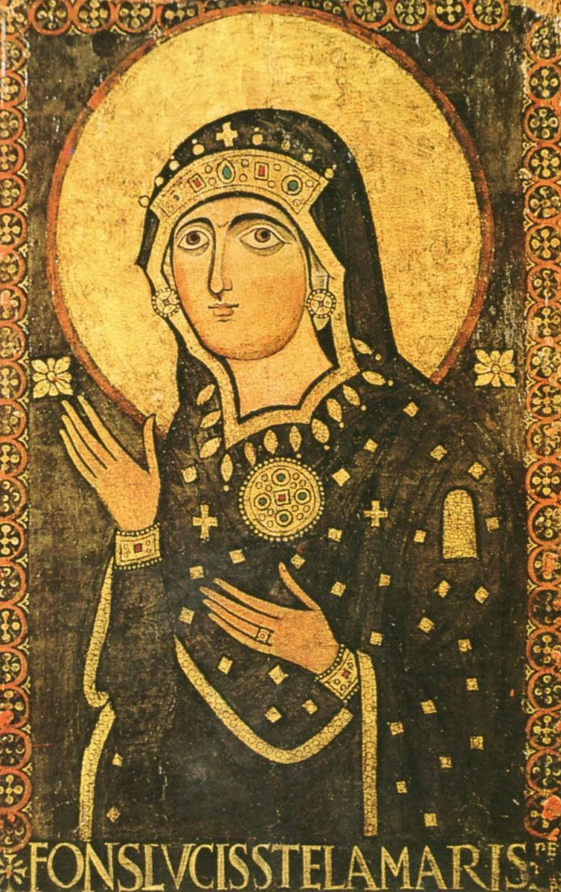
Early Medieval Stella Maris icon at the Santa Maria in Via Lata basilica, Rome

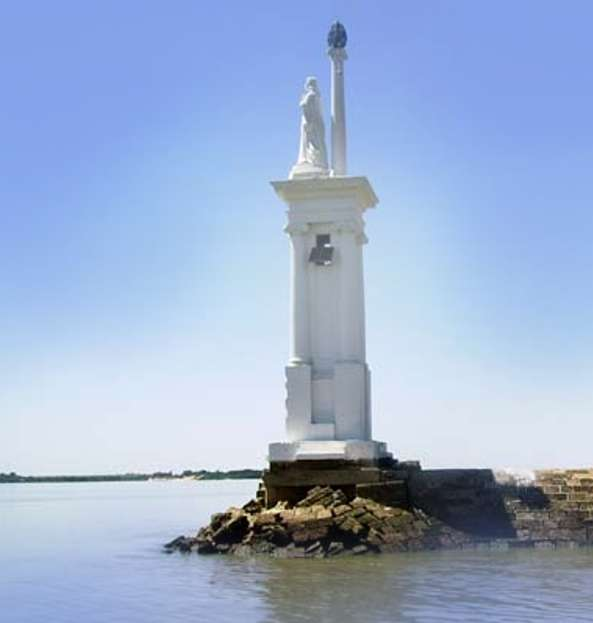
Stella Maris Lighthouse on the Uruguay River near the town of Concepción del Uruguay in Argentina

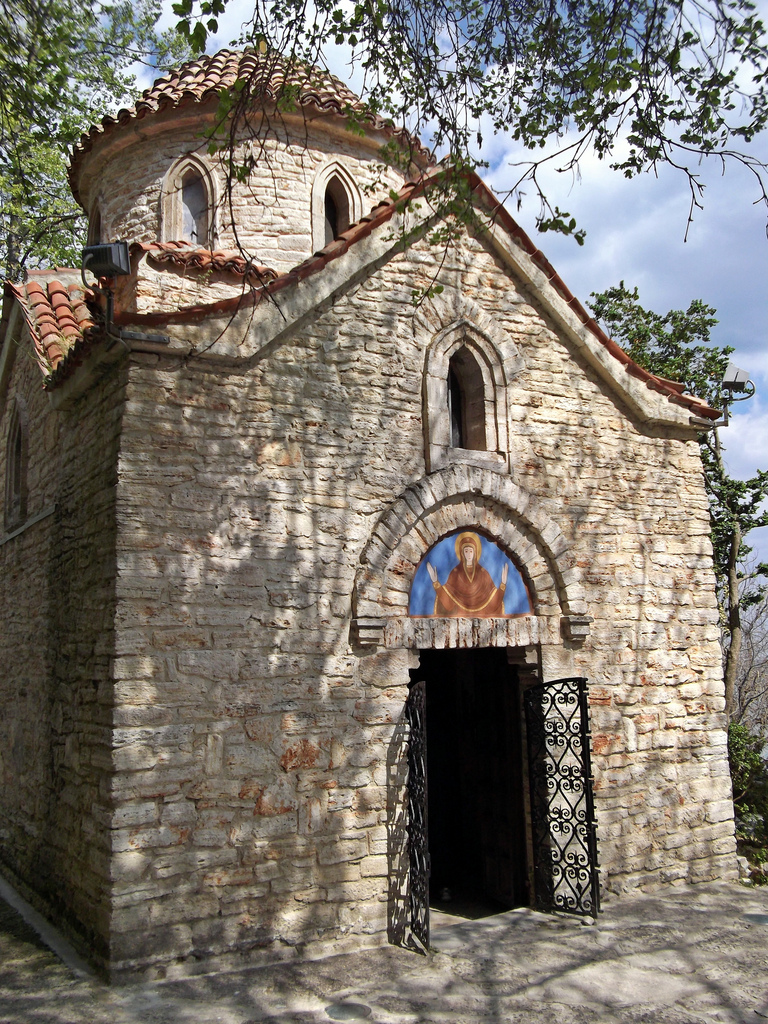
Traditional depiction of Our Lady, Star of the Sea

== See also ==
- Apostleship of the Sea
- Star of the Sea Church (disambiguation)
- Miriam (given name)
