= Segne du, Maria =

Hymn in German

- Christian hymn to Mary
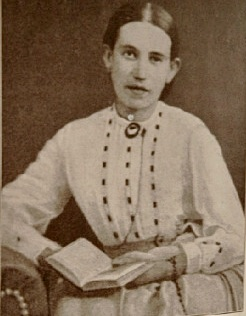
- Cordula Wöhler in 1885
- Written: 1870
- Text: by Cordula Wöhler
- Language: German
- Melody: by Karl Kindsmüller
- Composed: 1916

"Segne du, Maria" (Bless you, Mary) is a Christian Marian hymn in German with text by Cordula Wöhler in 1870, and a melody composed by Karl Kindsmüller and published in 1916, after the author's death. On popular demand, it is contained in the Gotteslob of 2013, and other hymnals and songbooks.

== History ==
Cordula Wöhler wrote the text of "Segne du, Maria" on 31 May 1870. She was raised in a Lutheran pastor's household, but planned to convert to Catholicism that year and was expelled from her home. She possibly expressed her feelings in the hymn.

Karl Kindsmüller, a priest, teacher, and lecturer at Regensburg's school of church music, composed a melody in 1916 or earlier. It was first published after Wöhler's death on a devotional leaflet, whose imprimatur is dated 2 June 1916. The hymn became part of collections and hymnals such as in Regensburg in 1919, in Munich in 1926 and in Altötting in 1938.

In the common German Catholic hymnal Gotteslob in 1975, it appeared only in six regional sections. The preferred styles of the 1970s were Neues Geistliches Lied and texts inspired by the Second Vatican Council. In a survey in parishes in Germany and Austria, to find missing songs for the second edition, it was the song missed most. It was included in the common section of the 2013 edition as GL 535. It is also part of other hymnals and songbooks.

== Text and theme ==
The text that Wöhler wrote for "Segne du, Maria" had nine stanzas of eight short lines each. The version in Gotteslob has three stanzas, and other prints usually also shorten the poetry. In the first stanza, Mary is addressed intimately as "du, Maria" (you, Mary), and is repeatedly requested to bless the singer, who identifies as "dein Kind" (your child). Lines 3 and 4 ask for blessing to find peace here (meaning: on earth), and heaven there. The last lines say: "Lass in deinem Segen / Tag und Nacht mich ruhn" (Let me rest in your blessing day and night).

The second stanza widens the view, requesting blessing for "alle, die mir lieb" (all dear to me). The final lines read: "Segne alle Herzen, / segne jedes Haus" (Bless all hearts, bless each house).

The final stanza reflects the hour of death which is also prominently mentioned in the Ave Maria. The text ends: "Bleib in Tod und Leben / unser Segen du" (Remain in death and life our blessing, you"), picking up the "du" from the very beginning at the end.

== Melody and usage ==
The melody for "Segne du, Maria" was composed by Karl Kindsmüller. He repeated the last two lines with increased intensity. The song is popular for May devotion and funerals. It has been described as "naiver Schlager", with a sweet yearning, but hidden depth. Several people, such as Joachim Meisner, have declared it their favourite hymn. He was a sceptic as a young man, but came to respect the song when more and more severely ill people asked him to sing it for them, and to repeat it when they died.
