= Leonine Prayers =

Set of prayers in Catholicism

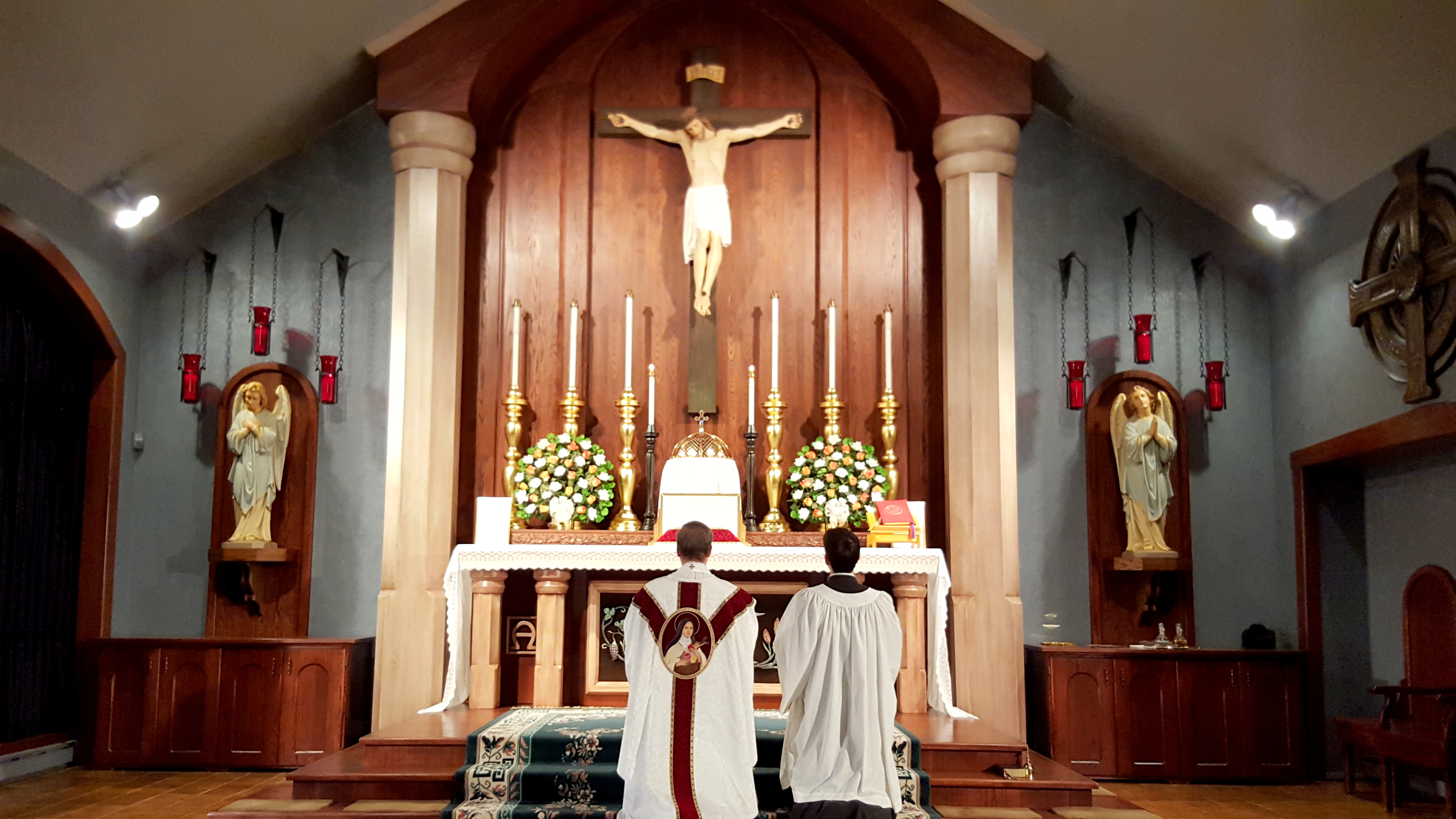
A priest and altar server kneel to recite the Leonine Prayers.

The Leonine Prayers, also known as Prayers after Mass, are a prescribed set of Catholic prayers for recitation by the priest and people after Low Mass required within the Roman Rite of the Latin Church from 1884 to 1965. The name derives from their introduction by Pope Leo XIII. They were slightly modified by Pope Pius X.

Originally, they were offered for the defence of the temporal sovereignty of the Holy See. After the problem was settled with the Lateran Treaty of 1929, Pope Pius XI ordered the intention shifted to the restoration in Soviet Russia of freedom to profess the Catholic faith. This gave rise to the unofficial name, “Prayers for the Conversion of Russia”.

The Leonine Prayers consist of three Ave Marias, a Salve Regina, a versicle and response, a prayer for the conversion of sinners and the liberty and exaltation of the Catholic Church, and a prayer to Saint Michael the Archangel. Pope Pius X permitted appending the invocation “Most Sacred Heart of Jesus, have mercy on us”, repeated three times.

== History ==
In 1859, Pope Pius IX, facing rebellion against his temporal sovereignty in the course of the Risorgimento, ordered that Masses celebrated in the Papal States be followed by three Ave Marias, a Salve Regina, a versicle and response, and a collect. He did not make these prayers obligatory in other countries, but did ask Catholics everywhere to pray for the defeat of those bent on destroying the Holy See’s temporal sovereignty.

On 6 January 1884, in the context of anti-clerical political and social developments in the new Kingdom of Italy, Pope Leo XIII ordered the prayers be recited throughout the world. In 1886, the text following the Salve Regina was modified to make it a prayer for the conversion of sinners and “the freedom and exaltation of Holy Mother Church”. The Prayer to Saint Michael was added at the same time.

Two slight changes were made later to the prayer after the Salve Regina, and in 1904, Pope Pius X granted permission to add at the conclusion of the Leonine Prayers a threefold invocation, “Most Sacred Heart of Jesus, have mercy on us”, a permission that was universally availed of.

In 1929, the Vatican City State was created, resolving the troubled relationship between the Holy See and the Italian state, which had been the object of the Leonine Prayers, and thus removing their raison d'être. But the following year, Pope Pius XI ordered that the Leonine Prayers should be offered “to permit tranquillity and freedom to profess the faith to be restored to the afflicted people of Russia”.

The 26 September 1964 Instruction Inter Oecumenici, which came into force on 7 March 1965, on implementing the Constitution on Sacred Liturgy of the Second Vatican Council decreed: “The Leonine Prayers are suppressed”.

== Rubrics ==
According to the original decree of 6 January 1884 that imposed the Leonine Prayers, they were to be said after every Low Mass, or as they were also called at the time, “private Masses”. According to one influential rubricist, the Leonine Prayers could be omitted after a Low Mass that was celebrated with special solemnity, such as an ordination or funeral Mass, a First Friday Votive Mass of the Sacred Heart, a Nuptial Mass, or the Mass after distribution of the ashes on Ash Wednesday, or if the Mass was followed immediately by some other liturgical function such as Benediction of the Blessed Sacrament or a Novena.

They were customarily said kneeling.

Of similar content is the prayer to the Virgin Mary revealed to Blessed Louis-Édouard Cestac.
