= Cordula Wöhler =

German writer (1845–1916)

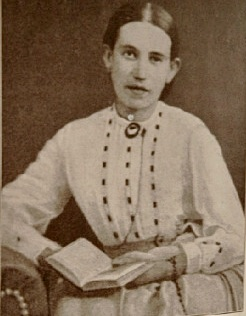
- Wöhler, c. 1885
- Born: 17 June 1845; Malchin, Mecklenburg, Kingdom of Prussia
- Died: 6 February 1916 (aged 70); Schwaz, Tyrol, Austria-Hungary
- Other names: Cordula Schmid; Cordula Peregrina
- Occupations: Author; Hymnwriter
- Awards: Pro Ecclesia et Pontifice

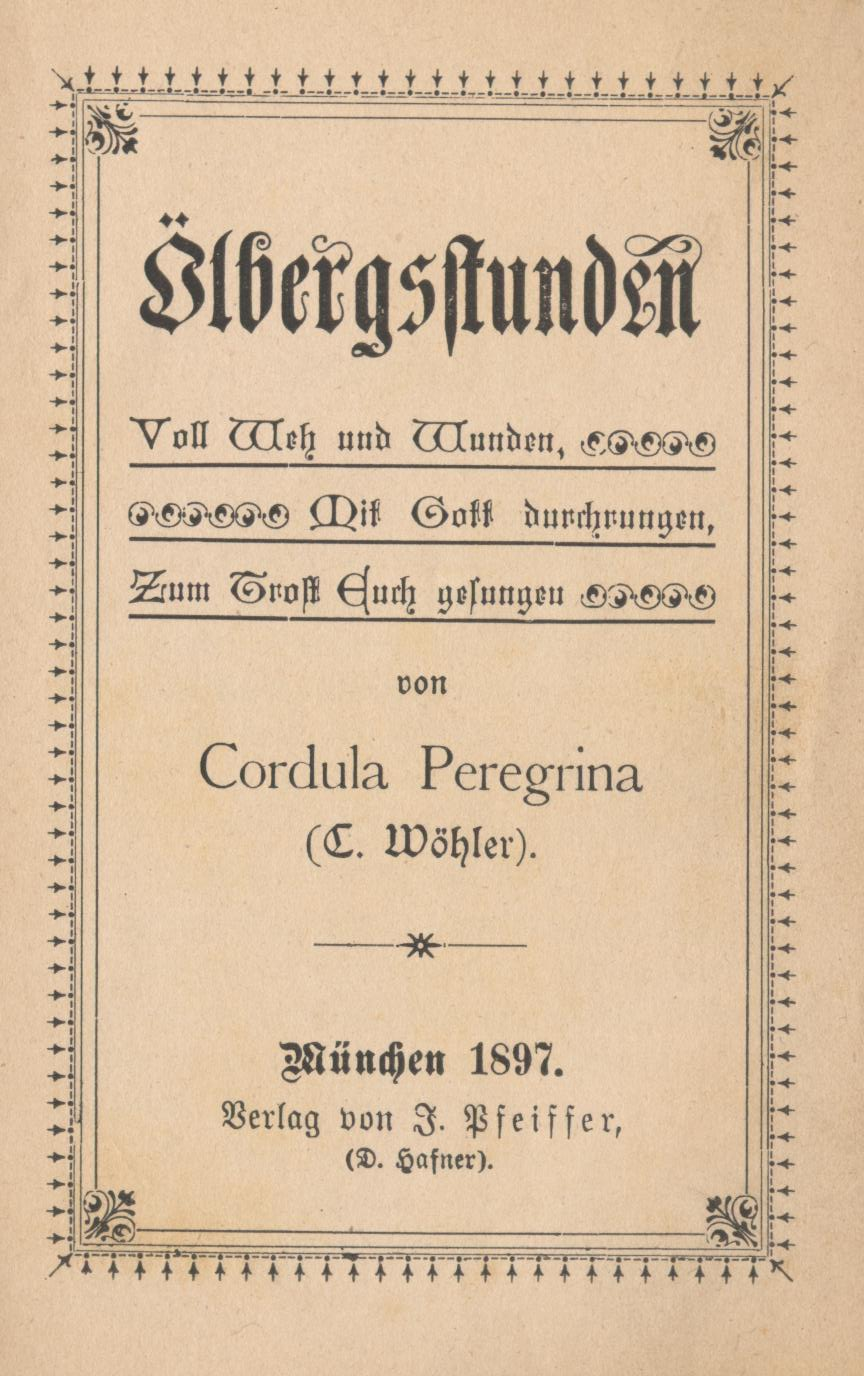
Book cover with pseudonym and real name

Cordula Wöhler, later Cordula Schmid, pseudonym Cordula Peregrina (17 June 1845 – 6 February 1916) was a German author of Christian poetry and hymns, whose "Segne du, Maria" is among the most popular Marian hymns in the Germanosphere. Wöhler wrote the poem after she, the daughter of a Lutheran pastor in Lichtenhagen, announced that she was converting to Catholicism, only to be expelled from her parental home and disowned by her family. Wöhler then moved to Austria-Hungary and became a recognised poet and author of Christian literature.

== Life ==
Born in Malchin, Mecklenburg, Cordula Wöhler was the oldest daughter of Wilhelm Wöhler (1814–1884) and his wife Cordula née Banck (1822–1900). When she was born, her father, a Lutheran theologian, was head of a school in Malchin. Her mother was the daughter of a merchant from Stralsund. When her father took office as pastor in Lichtenhagen near Rostock in 1856, she found a 15th-century Pietà in the village church. Impressed by the sculpture, she developed Marian devotions. She began a correspondence with priests and religious authors Christoph von Schmid and Alban Stolz. In August 1864, she travelled with her family in Thuringia, Bavaria, Tyrol and Switzerland. In Thuringia, she first attended the Tridentine Mass, which impressed her deeply. After intense correspondence with Fr. Stolz, and another vacation with her parents in traditionally Catholic southern Germany in 1868, she decided to convert to the Catholic Church. When her parents became aware of it in March 1869, they objected and forbade it. In 1870, Wöhler declared that she was, aged 25, independent and determined to convert. In response, her parents disowned her and expelled her from the family home.

Coping with this painful personal experience, she wrote a prayer hymn to Mary on 31 May 1870, "Segne du, Maria, segne mich, dein Kind" ("You, Mary, bless me, your child"). In 1916, Karl Kindsmüller (1876–1955), a teacher, church musician and composer of several sacred songs from Lower Bavaria, wrote a melody for it. (Note: 1916–1926, according to Michael Fischer in Freiburger Anthologie, 1916 according to Gotteslob (2013))

On 10 July 1870, Wöhler became a member of the Catholic Church in Freiburg im Breisgau. She made a confession of faith to the bishop Lothar von Kübel, and received confirmation three days later, and her first communion on 16 July 1870. She lived in Tyrol from March 1871 where Lukas Tolpeit, the Pfarrkurat of Eben am Achensee, had offered her a job. She wrote poems and religious essays. She then moved to Schwaz, where she worked in a pastry shop. After five months, she moved to live with a young couple on the nearby Freundsberg, where she wrote the poetry collection, Was das Ewige Licht erzählt. Gedichte über das allerheiligste Altarsakrament ("What the Eternal Light Relates. Poems about the most holy sacrament of the altar"). It appeared in 25 editions and established her recognition. She published more religious prose and poetry, some under the pseudonym Cordula Peregrina.

In 1876, Josef Anton Schmid from Oberstaufen requested a "pious poem" ("frommes Gedicht") from her for a memorial plaque for the Jesuit Jakob Rem. Schmid and Wöhler entered an intense correspondence, resulting in an engagement before they had met in person. They married in Riezlern, Kleinwalsertal, and moved to Bregenz. She kept publishing under her maiden name. The couple moved to Schwaz in 1881, where they bought a house and adopted two orphan girls. She kept writing, and was active in the local parish together with her husband. The relationship with her birth family improved, with letters and occasional visits of her parents and her sister in Schwaz, but she never returned home.

She died in Schwaz, and was buried next to her husband, who died a few months later, in the cemetery beside their parish church. According to the epitaph, she was a recipient of the Pro Ecclesia et Pontifice cross.
