= Hail Queen of Heaven, the Ocean Star =

Marian hymn

"Hail, Queen of Heaven, the Ocean Star" is a Marian hymn written by Father John Lingard (1771–1851), a Catholic priest and historian who, through the works of William Cobbett, helped to smooth the passage of the Catholic Emancipation Act in England.

== History ==
Loosely based on the medieval Latin plainchant Ave maris stella, the hymn is generally sung to the modified traditional English melody Stella. This melody was published in 1851 by Henri Frederick Hemy in his "Easy Hymn Tunes for Catholic Schools". The name Stella comes from the village of that name near Newcastle-upon-Tyne where Hemy was the organist in a local church. According to one account, after playing the organ for evening benediction on Sunday at Stella, he called into the (old) Board Inn at the foot of Stella Lane with some companions and seated at the piano first played his rendition of the tune.

J. Vincent Higginson described it as "one of the oldest English vernacular hymns commonly found in Catholic hymnals."

== Nautical imagery ==
A ship was an early Christian symbol. The word "nave", used to describe the main body of a church, is from the medieval Latin word navis, meaning "ship", possibly with some reference to the "Ship of St Peter" or the Ark of Noah. Catherine of Siena described the Church as a ship. The image was transferred to the individual travelling on life's stormy or tempestuous seas. This motif of a ship can also be found in the first stanza of Mother Dear, O Pray For Me, as well as in Matthew 8:22-34, where Christ calmed the storm for his apostles who were travelling by boat, and walked on the water with St Peter. Moreover, in Matthew 4:18-22, it says that many of the apostles were fishermen and that Christ made St Peter and St Andrew fishers of men.

== Tolkien ==
Much has been written of the influence of Tolkien's Catholicism on the imagery he employs. In his legendarium, Varda, also known as Elbereth, is one of the Valar and the highest of the "guardians". Peter Kreeft sees her as one of the clearest reflections of Roman Catholic Marian devotion in Tolkien's work. Both Marjorie Burns and Stratford Caldecott see in the Elvish hymn A Elbereth Gilthoniel an echo of the Marian hymn, Hail Queen of Heaven. According to Caldecott, "Tolkien would have been familiar with one of the most popular Catholic hymns from his childhood, the tone and mood of which are markedly close to those of Tolkien’s song to Elbereth."

O Elbereth! Gilthoniel!
We still remember, we who dwell
In this far land beneath the trees,
Thy Starlight on the Western seas.
