= Ave maris stella =

Medieval Marian hymn

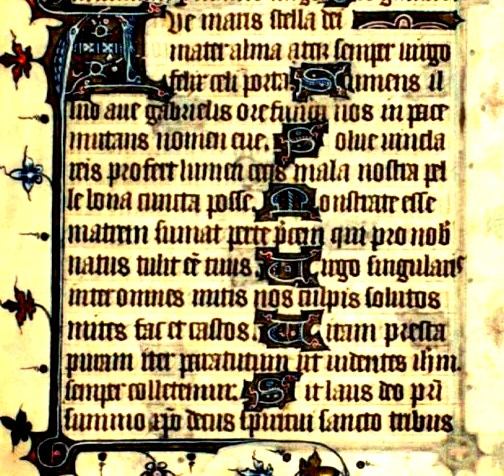
Ave maris stella in a 14th-century antiphonary

"Ave maris stella" (Latin for 'Hail, star of the sea') is a medieval Marian hymn, usually sung at Vespers. It was especially popular in the Middle Ages and has been used by many composers, as the basis of other compositions.

== Background ==
Authorship of the original hymn has been attributed to several people, including Bernard of Clairvaux (12th century), Venantius Fortunatus (6th century) and Hermannus Contractus (11th century). Probably originating in the 9th century, it appears as a 10th century addition in two 9th-century manuscripts, one from Salzburg (now in Vienna) and the other still at the Abbey of Saint Gall. Its frequent occurrence in the Divine Office made it popular in the Middle Ages, other hymns being founded upon it. "Ave maris stella" was highly influential in presenting the Blessed Virgin Mary as a merciful and loving Mother. "Much of its charm is due to its simplicity". The title "Star of the Sea" is one of the oldest and most widespread titles applied to Mary. This hymn is frequently used as a prayer for the safe conduct of travelers.

The melody is found in the Irish plainsong "Gabhaim Molta Bríde", a piece in praise of Saint Brigid of Kildaire. The popular modern hymn Hail Queen of Heaven, the Ocean Star, is loosely based on this plainsong original.

== Latin lyrics ==
Beginning of "Ave maris stella" in the 1912 Antiphonale Romanum

The Latin text of the hymn as authorized for use in the Liturgy of the Hours of the Roman Rite (Ordinary Form) is as follows:

Ave, maris stella,
Dei mater alma,
atque semper virgo,
Felix cæli porta.

Sumens illud Ave
Gabrielis ore,
funda nos in pace,
mutans Evæ nomen.

Solve vincla reis,
profer lumen cæcis,
mala nostra pelle,
bona cuncta posce.

Monstra te esse matrem,
sumat per te precem
qui pro nobis natus
tulit esse tuus.

Virgo singularis,
inter omnes mitis,
nos culpis solutos
mites fac et castos.

Vitam præsta puram,
iter para tutum,
ut videntes Jesum
semper collætemur.

Sit laus Deo Patri,
summo Christo decus,
Spiritui Sancto
tribus honor unus. Amen.

Translation:

Hail, star of the sea,
Nurturing Mother of God,
And ever Virgin
Happy gate of Heaven

Receiving that "Ave" (hail)
From the mouth of Gabriel,
Establish us in peace,
Transforming the name of "Eva" (Eve).

Loosen the chains of the guilty,
Send forth light to the blind,
Our evil do thou dispel,
Entreat (for us) all good things.

Show thyself to be a Mother:
Through thee may he receive prayer
Who, being born for us,
Undertook to be thine own.

O unique Virgin,
Meek above all others,
Make us, set free from (our) sins,
Meek and chaste.

Bestow a pure life,
Prepare a safe way:
That seeing Jesus,
We may ever rejoice.

Praise be to God the Father,
To the Most High Christ (be) glory,
To the Holy Spirit
(Be) honour, to the Three equally. Amen.

== Musical settings ==
The plainchant hymn has been developed by many composers from pre-Baroque to the present day. The Roman Rite employs four different plainchant tunes for "Ave maris stella"; the first three are designated for solemnities, feasts, and memorials of the Blessed Virgin Mary; a fourth is given in the Little Office of the Blessed Virgin Mary as an alternative to the memorial tone. The tunes have been used as the cantus firmus for some polyphonic settings of the Mass, including those by Josquin and Victoria.

Renaissance settings include those by Hans Leo Hassler, Felice Anerio, Giovanni Pierluigi da Palestrina, Guillaume Dufay, John Sheppard, and William Byrd. Baroque settings include Monteverdi's Vespro della Beata Vergine 1610, one by Emperor Leopold I, one by Louis Couperin in 1658, four settings by Marc-Antoine Charpentier (H.60, H.63, H.65, H.67 1670–1680s), and Sébastien de Brossard. Romantic settings include those by Dvorak, Grieg, Liszt, and Elgar. Modern composers who have either set the text or used the hymn as an inspiration include Marcel Dupré, Flor Peeters, Abel Decaux, Peter Maxwell Davies, Grace Williams, James MacMillan, Jean Langlais, Cecilia McDowall and others.

== Acadian National Anthem ==
In 1884, the second Acadian National Convention at Miscouche, Prince Edward Island, adopted "Ave maris stella" as the anthem of Acadia.

== See also ==
- Our Lady, Star of the Sea
- Our Lady Star of the Sea Church (disambiguation)
