= Stabat Mater speciosa =

Catholic hymn to Mary about the Nativity of Jesus

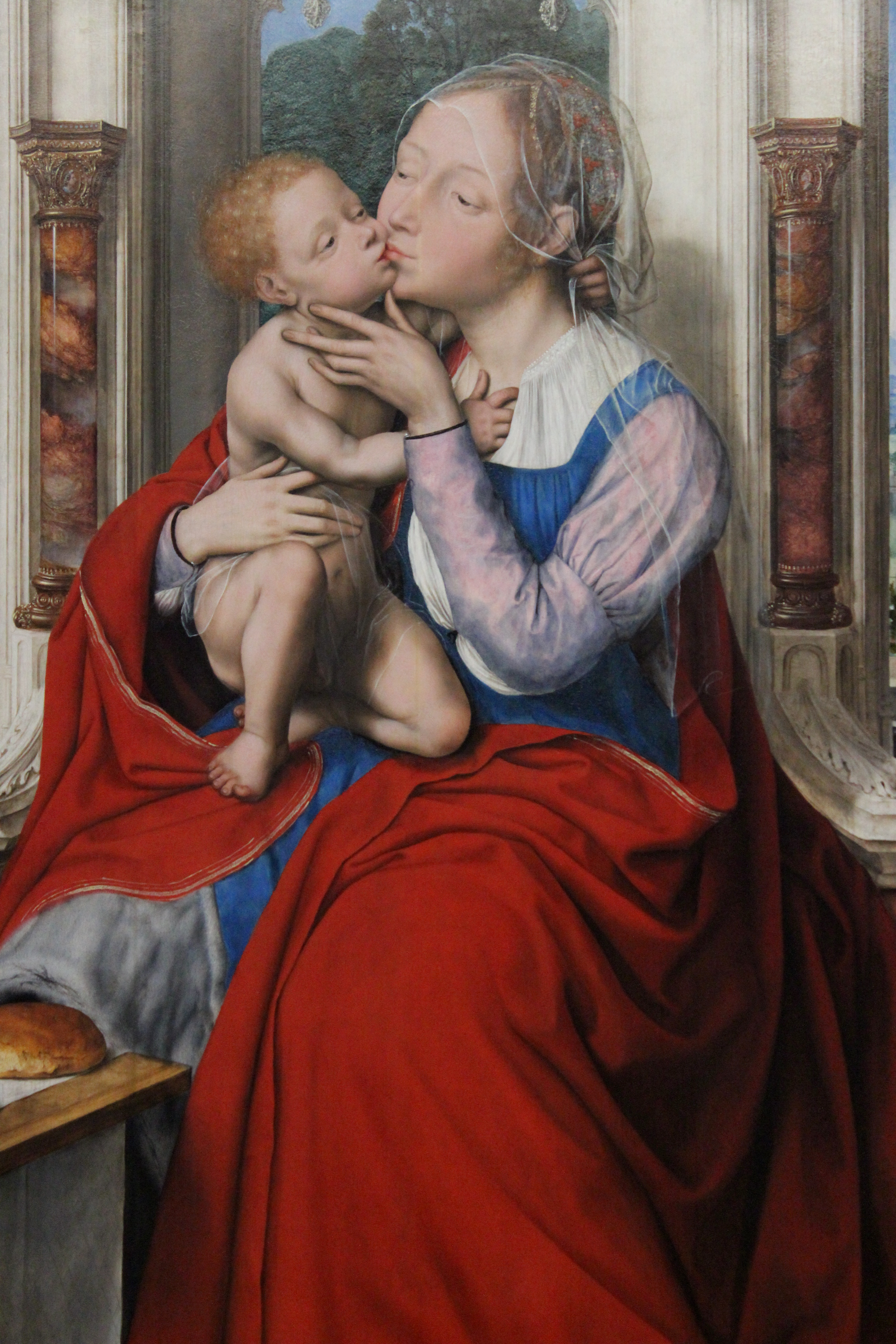

"Stabat Mater speciosa" ("The beautiful mother stood") is a Catholic hymn to Mary about the Nativity of Jesus.

It first appeared in a 1495 edition of the Italian poems of Jacopone da Todi, along with "Stabat Mater dolorosa", but "Stabat Mater speciosa" was almost forgotten until it was re-transcribed in 1852 in the Poètes Franciscains en Italie au Treizième siècle in Paris. It has since been viewed as one of the tenderest Marian hymns and one of the seven greatest Latin hymns. It has become part of standard oratorios (e.g. Franz Liszt's Christus), and has given rise to various Christmas carols.
