= Marian litany =

Prayer to Mary, mother of Jesus

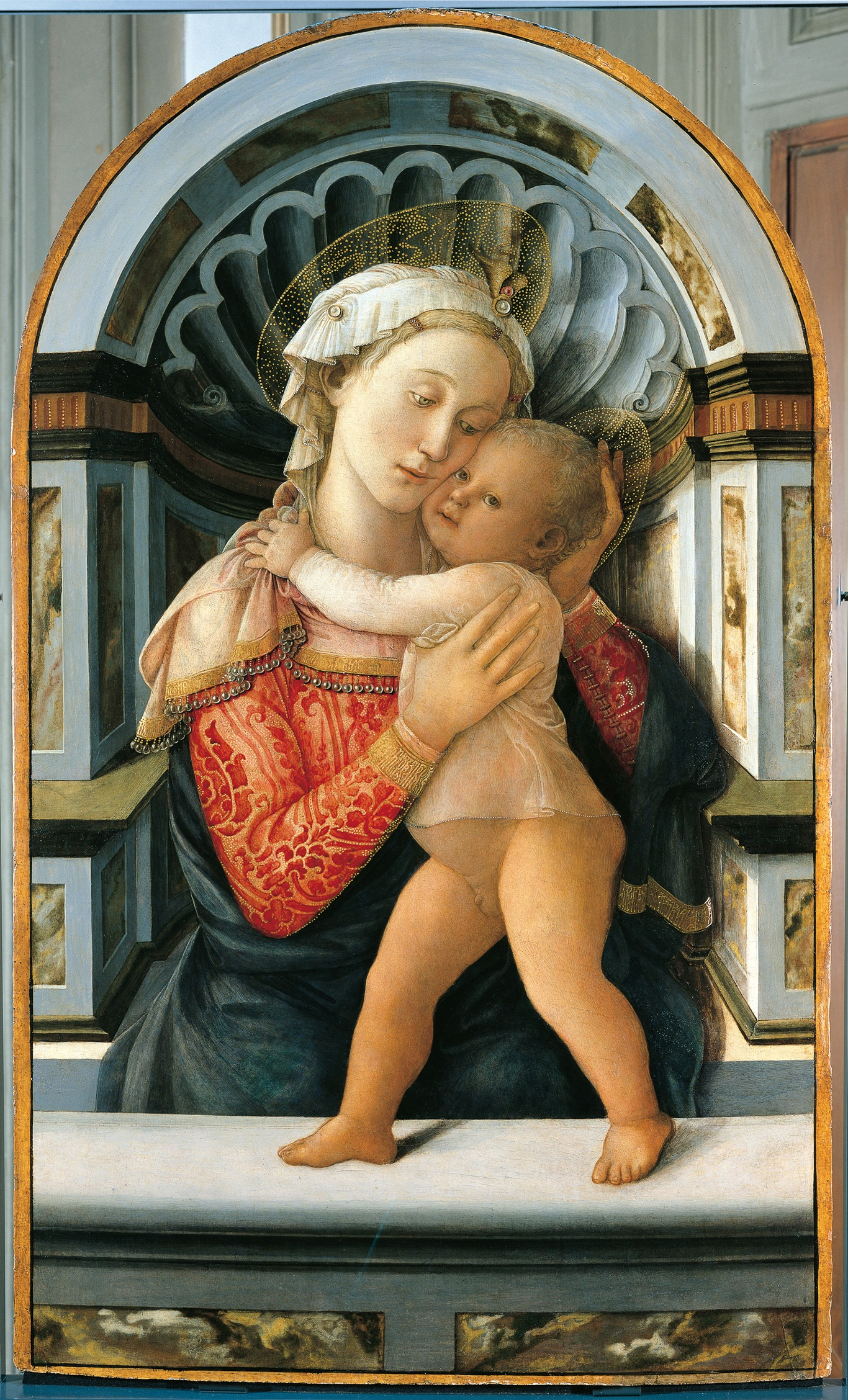
Madonna by Filippo Lippi

In Christian worship, Marian litany is a form of prayer to Mary, mother of Jesus used in church services and processions, and consisting of a number of petitions.

In the Eastern Church litanies are always a part of the official liturgy, and they have at least three different forms: Synaptae (Collect), Ektenie ("intense" prayer of intercession and pardon based in part on Psalm 50) and Aitaesis (intercessory prayer for peace, pardon and protection). Marian litanies are numerous in the Eastern church and may cover a multitude of themes, some dogmatic, others of moral and patriotic character.

In the liturgy of the Western Church the word litany is derived from the Latin litania, meaning prayer of invocation or intercession. It also meant, up to the twelfth century, a procession with intercessory character, also known under the designation of rogation. There are two approved Marian litanies in the Western Church: the Litany of Loreto, and the Litany for the Coronation of Images of the Blessed Virgin Mary, which can be an appropriate substitute for the other litany on certain occasions.

== History ==
=== Private devotion ===
The first Marian litanies must have been composed to foster private devotion, as it is not at all probable that they were written for use in public, by reason of their drawn-out and heavy style. Lengthy and involved litanies of this type do not seem to have won popularity, though it is possible to find other examples of a like kind, but the tendency is always towards brevity and simplicity. To each invocation of "Sancta Maria" it becomes customary to add only one praise, and these praises show in general a better choice or a better arrangement.

The earliest known genuine text of a Marian litany is in a 12th-century codex in the Mainz Library, with the title Letania de domina nostra Dei genitrice virgine Maria: oratio valde bona. It opens with the usual Kyrie Eleison; then follow the invocations of the Trinity, followed by invocations of the Virgin Mary in a long series of praises. This goes on for more than fifty times, always repeating the invocation "Sancta Maria", but varying the laudatory titles given. Then, after this manner of the litanies of the saints, a series of petitions occur. The litany concludes with the Agnus Dei.

=== Public use ===
Once the custom grew up of reciting Marian litanies privately, and of gradually shortening the text, it was not long until the idea occurred of employing them for public devotion, especially in cases of epidemic, as had been the practice of the Church with the litanies of the Saints, which were sung in penitential processions and during public calamities.

The earliest certain mention of a public recital of Marian Litanies is actually related to a time of pestilence, particularly in the 15th century. At Venice, in fact, these same litanies were finally adopted for liturgical use in processions for plague and mortality and asking for rain or for fair weather. Probably they began to be sung in this connection during the calamities of the 15th century; but in the following century they are prescribed, as being an ancient custom, in the ceremonials of St. Mark's.

A litany of this new form is that of a codex in the Library of St. Mark's, Venice, dating from the end of the 13th or the beginning of the 14th century. It is found, though with occasional variants, in many manuscripts. It omits the petitions, and consists of seventy-five praises joined to the usual invocation, "Sancta Maria". For example:

Holy Mary, Mother and Spouse of Christ
pray for me;
Holy Mary, Mother inviolate
pray for me;
Holy Mary, Temple of the Holy Ghost
pray for me;
Holy Mary, Queen of Heaven
pray for me;

Holy Mary, Mistress of the Angels
pray for me;
Holy Mary, Star of Heaven
pray for me;
Holy Mary, Gate of Paradise
pray for me;
Holy Mary, Mother of True Counsel
pray for me

With regard to their content, which consists mainly of praises of the Blessed Virgin, it would seem to have been taken not so much from the Scriptures and the Church Fathers, at least directly, as from popular medieval Latin poetry. In the earlier and longer litanies whole rhythmic strophes are to be found, taken bodily from such poetry, and employed as praises of the Blessed Virgin. With regard to their form, it is certain that those who first composed the Marian litanies aimed at imitating the litanies of the Saints which had been in use in the Church since the 8th century. The basic principle of the Marian litanies is the constant repetition of the invocation, "Sancta Maria, ora pro nobis." And in order that this repetition might not prove monotonous in the Middle Ages recourse was had to an expedient since then universally used, not only in private devotions but even in liturgical prayer, that of amplifying by means of what are called tropes. It was an easy matter to improvise between the "Sancta Maria" and the "Ora pro nobis", repeated over and over, a series of tropes consisting of different praises, with an occasional added petition, imitated however broadly from the litanies of the saints. Thus, the Marian litany was evolved.

=== Later evolution ===
Another type of litany, appearing in the second half of the fifteenth century, was to be publicly chanted tempore pestis sive epydimic. The invocations are very simple and all begin, not with the words "Sancta Maria", but with "Sancta mater", e.g.: Sancta mater Creatoris; Sancta mater Salvatoris; Sancta mater munditie, etc. At the end, however, are a few short petitions such as those found in the litanies of the saints.

Gradually the praises became simpler; at times the petitions were omitted, and, from the second half of the 15th century, the repetition of the "Sancta Maria" began to be avoided, so that the praises alone remained, with the accompaniment "Ora pro nobis". The connecting link between the older litanies and this new group may have been a litany found in a manuscript of prayers, copied in 1524 by Fra Giovanni da Falerona. It consists of fifty-seven praises, and the "Sancta Maria" is repeated, but only at intervals of six or seven praises, perhaps because the shape or size of the parchment was so small that it held only six or seven lines to the page, and the copyist contented himself with writing the "Sancta Maria" once at the head of each page. But, because of its archaic form, this litany must be considerably anterior to 1524, and may have been copied from some 15th-century manuscript. The praises are chosen in part from previous litanies, and in part they are original. The arrangement is better and more varied. The first place is given to praises bestowed on the name of "Mater"; then come those expressing the Blessed Virgin's tender love for mankind; then the titles given her in the creeds; then those beginning with "Regina", which are identical with those we now have in the Litany of Loreto. Two new titles are introduced: "Causa nostræ lætitiæ" and "Vas spirituale", which are not found in earlier litanies. It also includes three invocations, "Advocata christianorum", "Refugium desperatorum", "Auxilium peccatorum", which passed by an easy change into the "Refugium peccatorum" and "Auxilium christianorum" of the Litany of Loreto. There are many similar examples in which the litany consists of praises alone without the repetition of the "Sancta Maria", and in which arrangement and form come nearer and nearer to the Litany of Loreto.

This form of litany was widely circulated, both in script and in print, during the 16th century. A comparison of the texts will show that they contain the praises in the Loreto Litany, with two exceptions: the "Virgo prudentissima" of the Loreto Litany is found as "Virgo prudens", and the "Auxilium christianorum", though it appears in no text before this time, is, as remarked above, an easy variant of the litany of 1524. It is probable that the Loreto text became customary in the Holy House towards the close of the 15th century, at a time when in other places similar litanies were being adapted for public use to obtain deliverance from some calamity.

== Eastern Church ==
In the Eastern Church litanies are always a part of the official liturgy, and they have at least three different forms: Synaptae (Collect), Ektenie ("intense" prayer of intercession and pardon based in part on Psalm 50) and Aitaesis (intercessory prayer for peace, pardon and protection). Among these are the "Epitaphian Threnos" recalling Mary's suffering on Good Friday. The 6th century Akathist to the Theotokos, a sixth century hymn, includes a number of litanies.

== See also ==
- Ectenia -litany in the Easter Churches
- Litany of Loreto
- Marian devotions
