= Freu dich, du Himmelskönigin =

German Marian hymn

- Marian hymn
- English: Be glad, you Queen of Heaven
- Occasion: Eastertide
- Written: 16th century
- Language: German
- Based on: Regina caeli
- Published: 2001

"Freu dich, du Himmelskönigin" (Be glad, you Queen of Heaven) is a Marian hymn for Eastertide, a paraphrase of the Latin Regina caeli, first published in 1600. It has appeared in German hymnals and songbooks.

== History ==
It is unknown who created the text of "Freu dich, du Himmelskönigin" as a paraphrase of the Latin Regina caeli. It was published in Konstanz in 1600. Like its Latin model, it is a hymn for Eastertide, expressing joy about the resurrection of Jesus. The song was included in the 2013 German Catholic hymnal Gotteslob as GL 525, in the section Maria. The song was also printed in other songbooks including ecumenical collections.

== Text and theme ==
The text of "Freu dich, du Himmelskönigin" is in four stanzas of five lines each. Lines 2, 4 und 5 are the same for all stanzas, the second line being "Freu dich, Maria" (Be glad, Mary), the fourth "Bitt Gott für uns, Maria!" (Pray God for us, Mary!) in intercession, followed by a twofold Halleluja. Lines 1 and 3 expand in two lines one thought from the lines of the original hymn: greeting Mary saying that she should be glad ("Regina coeli laetare"), saying that she was worthy to carry Jesus ("Quia quem meruisti portare"), saying that he is living as he had predicted ("Resurrexit, sicut dixit"), and a request for intercession ("Ora pro nobis Deum").
