= Peter of Compostela =

Peter of Compostela (Latin: Petrus Compostellanus) is the name given to the author of De consolatione rationis (The Consolation of Reason). This was a prosimetrum based on Boethius's Consolation of Philosophy. He is now thought to have been a grammar teacher in Santiago de Compostela between 1317 and 1330, but was previously conjectured to have been a bishop in the twelfth century.
