= Karl Kindsmüller =

German priest and composer

Karl Kindsmüller (9 April 1876 in Poikam (now part of Bad Abbach) – 26 August 1955 in Regensburg) was a German priest and composer. Kindsmüller attended the Regensburg School of Church Music (Katholische Kirchenmusikschule) in Regensburg. He was ordained priest in 1900. He was teacher at several gymnasiums in Regensburg, lecturer at the School of Church Music, and part-time composer. His most famous work was composing the melody for Cordula Wöhler's hymn "Segne du, Maria" after the author's death.
