= Paul Damance =

Paul Damance [D’Amance] (c. 1650 – after 1718) was a French religious of the ordre de la sainte Trinité et rédemption des captifs, who had several masses in "musical plainsong" published between 1687 and 1707.

== Biography ==
In addition to his membership of the Trinitarian Order (a charitable order, also dedicated to the redemption of Europeans who had become slaves of the Moors), he claimed to be an organist of his convent in Lisieux. We have some documents that testify to his presence in the convent of Lisieux. His dedications reveal that he was in contact with several women's convents where plainsong was sung at the services.

The masses and additional pieces he published from 1687 onwards were composed in a style of musical plainsong in the taste of Henry Du Mont, that is to say a rather melodic plainsong, with indicated values (long and brief) and with some ornaments. It is mainly composed for women's convents.

== Works ==
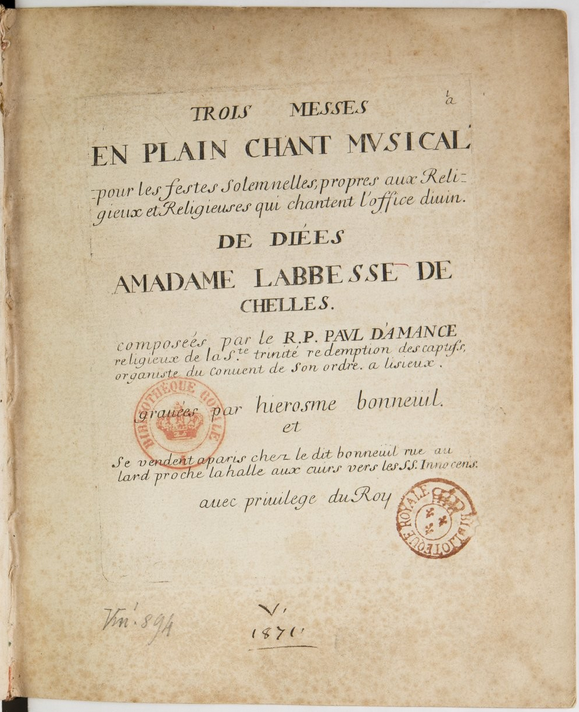
Title page of the Messes en plain-chant musical (Paris, 1687). Paris BNF.

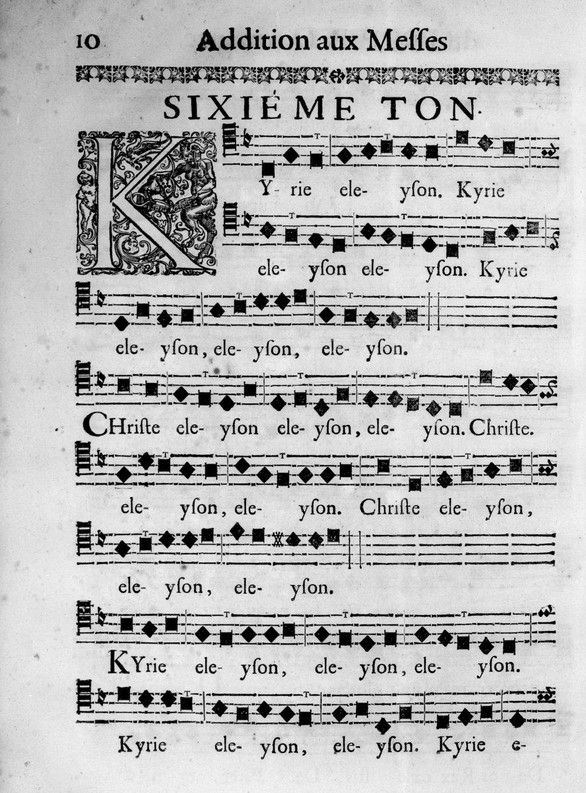
One page of the Additions aux messes... dated 1707 (Paris BNF).

=== Plainchant ===
All the works below are available at the BnF, in original or in reproduction.

- Messes en plain chant musical pour les festes solennelles propres aux religieuses qui chantent l'office divin... Paris: Jérôme Bonneuil, 1687. 4°, 20 p., engraved, noted plainchant. The privilege is dated 14 August 1657. Digitized on Gallica.

Dédicace à Mmes de Fonteine, religieuses de l'ordre de Fontevrauld. Includes a Messe de la Sainte vierge and a Messe de St Paul.

- Trois messes en plain chant musical pour les festes solennelles, propres aux religieux et religieuses qui chantent l'office divin... Paris: Jérôme Bonneuil, 1687. 4°, 31 p., engraved, noted plainsong. Same privilege as above.

Dedication to Madame Catherine de Scorailles de Roussille, abbess of the Royal Abbey of Notre-Dame de Chelles. includes a Messe de sainte Catherine, a Messe de saint Benoît and a Messe de sainte Cécile.

- Six messes en plein chant musical propres pour toutes les personnes qui chantent l'office divin... Paris: Christophe Ballard, 1701. 2°, 46 p., noted plainsong.

Contains six masses, of the 1st, 2nd, 3rd, 5th natural tones, 5th transposed tone, 6th tone. The author's opinion states that the masses have been composed for organ, and asks that the sharps and the flats marked be respected. This edition is published in the same year as the fourth edition of Henry Du Mont's "Five Masses in Musical Plain Song", published by the same printer, to promote them simultaneously. The incipitates of this volume are detailed in the Neuma database.

- Addition aux messes en plein-chant musical composées par le R.P. P. D'Amance... Contenant deux messes, avec les élévations, de tons différents; le Magnificat, de quatre manières & tons différents; les Litanies de la Sainte Vierge; les élévations O Salutaris, & Panis angelicus, différentes de celles qui sont dans les messes; et le Domine salvum fac Regem, de trois manières et de tons différents. Paris : Christophe Ballard, 1707. 2°, II-46 p., noted plainsong. Digitized on Gallica Read online.

Contains at the beginning an epistle to the prioress and the nuns bénédictines de l'Adoration perpétuelle du Très Saint Sacrement, signed by the printer. Contains two masses (1st and 6th tones), four masses (1st, 2nd, 5th and 6th tones), the Litanies of the Blessed Virgin, two elevations (2nd and 6th tones), and three Domine salvum fac regem (6th, 2nd and 5th tones).

In addition to these four editions, some of Damance's works can be found in liturgical manuscripts, for example:

- Tournai, Bibliothèque de l'archevêché, MS 329. This stencil manuscript, signed by Mons, Typis Palumbinis, 1774 and which also contains masses of Henry Du Mont and François de La Feillée, includes the following pieces by Damance: 4 masses (1st, 5th, 5th transposed and 6th tones), 4 elevations and 2 magnificats.

=== Pieces for organ ===
- Duo du 8eton. This piece for organ appears with the mention du Perre Paul Damance in the manuscript Paris BNF (Mus.): Vm 7 1823.

Published at page 281 of Archives des Maîtres de l'orgue, ed. Alexandre Guilmant, vol. 9 (Organ pieces attributed to Nicolas Lebègue: published for the first time according to the manuscript Vm7 1823 of the Bibliothèque nationale, 1909).

== Discography ==
- André Raison, Messes d’orgue des 3rd andt 8th tons: plain-chant alterné d’Henry Du Mont. Jean-Patrice Brosse, organ, ensemble Vox Cantoris, dir. Jean-Christophe Candau. 1 CD Psalmus, 2010. The mass for organ of the 8th ton of Reason is alternated with the 6th ton mass by Paul Damance.

== See also ==
- Henry Du Mont
- Trinitarian Order
- Christophe Ballard

== Sources ==
- Armand Bénet et Jules Renard. Inventaire sommaire des archives départementales antérieures à 1790. Calvados. Archives ecclésiastiques : série H supplément, articles 1-1320. Tome premier. Caen : H. Delesques, 1891. XLVII-398 p.
- Laurence Decobert. Henry Du Mont (1610–1684) : maistre et compositeur de la Musique de la Chapelle du Roy et de la Reyne. Versailles : CMBV; Liège : Mardaga, 2011. 4°, 478 p.
- Jean Fournée. Les Trinitaires en Normandie : couvents et confréries, in Société Historique et Archéologique de l'Orne, Bulletin principal 102/4 (1983) (pp. 107–121).
- Yannick Leroy. La musique à Lisieux au XVIIe siècle, in Le Pays d'Auge 4 (1996) p. 9-17 et 5 (1996) (pp. 20–28).
- Léopold Ferdinand Désiré Piel. Inventaire historique des actes transcrits aux insinuations ecclésiastiques de l'ancien Diocèse de Lisieux, ou documents officiels analysés pour servir à l'histoire du personnel de l'évêché, de la cathédrale, des collégiales, des abbayes et prieurés, des paroisses et chapelles, ainsi que de toutes les familles notables de ce diocèse... : 1692-1790… Lisieux: printer E. Lerebour, 1891–1895. 5 vol. 8°.
