= Salve Regina =

Medieval Catholic hymn to Mary, mother of Jesus

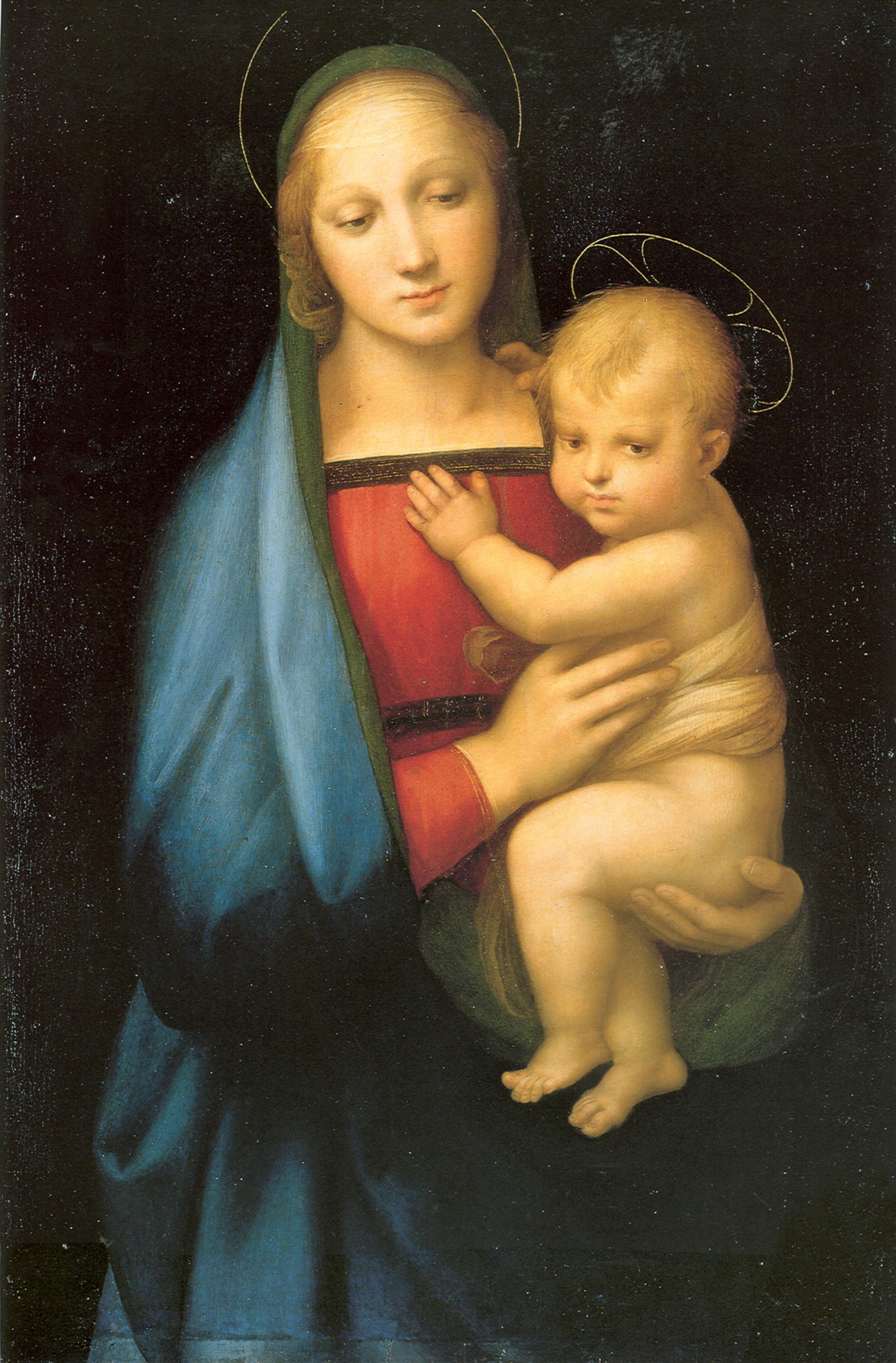
Madonna by Raphael, an example of Marian art

Salve Regina attributed to Hermann von Reichenau (1013–1054), sung by Les Petits Chanteurs de Passy. (Gregorian notation below.)

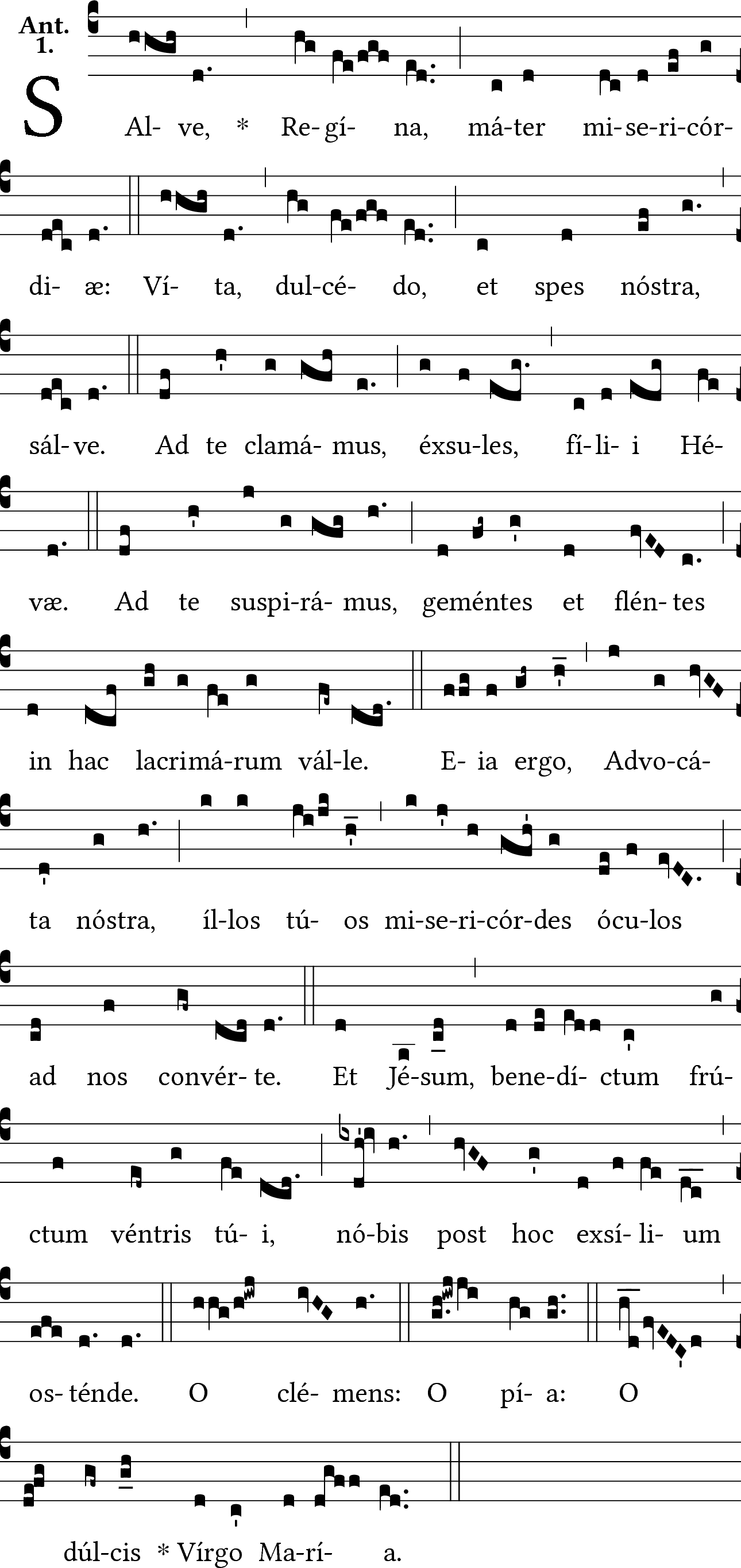
The Salve Regina in solemn tone, neume notation, used in Gregorian chant

The "Salve Regina" (/ˌsælveɪ rəˈdʒiːnə/ SAL-vay rə-JEE-nə, Ecclesiastical Latin: [ˈsalve reˈdʒiːna]; meaning "Hail Queen"), also known as the "Hail Holy Queen", is a Marian hymn and one of four Marian antiphons sung at different seasons within the Christian liturgical calendar of the Catholic Church. The Salve Regina is traditionally sung at Compline in the time from the Saturday before Trinity Sunday until the Friday before the first Sunday of Advent. The Hail Holy Queen is also the final prayer of the Rosary.

The work was composed during the Middle Ages and originally appeared in Latin, the prevalent language of Western Christianity until modern times. Though traditionally ascribed to the eleventh-century German monk Hermann of Reichenau, as well as to Bernard of Clairvaux, Peter of Compostela and Adhemar of Le Puy, among others, it is regarded as anonymous by most musicologists. Traditionally it has been sung in Latin, though many translations exist. These are often used as spoken prayers.

== Background and history ==
Marian antiphons have been sung, since the thirteenth century, at the close of Compline, the last Office of the day. Peter Canisius (d. 1597) noted that one praises God in Mary when one turns to her in song. Liturgically, the Salve Regina is the best known of four prescribed Marian Anthems recited after Compline, and, in some uses, after Lauds or other Hours. Its use after Compline is likely traceable to the monastic practice of intoning it in chapel and chanting it on the way to sleeping quarters.

It was set down in largely its current form at the Abbey of Cluny in the 12th century, where it was used as a processional hymn on Marian feasts. The Cistercians chanted the Salve Regina daily from 1218. It was popular at medieval universities as an evening song, and according to Juniper Carol, it came to be part of the ritual for the blessing of a ship. While the anthem figured largely in liturgical and in general popular Catholic devotion, it was especially dear to sailors.

In the 13th century, in either the 1220s or 1230s, the Dominican friars in Bologna adopted the nightly Salve procession at Compline, and this practice soon spread throughout their entire order. Because the Dominicans were so diffuse in Europe even in their early years, the popularity of the singing and procession is largely attributed to them. Pope Gregory IX, on the advice of the Dominican St. Raymond of Penyafort, instituted the practice for the diocese of Rome on Fridays at Compline, and many dioceses and religious orders throughout Europe are recorded as adopting the practice in some form or another throughout the 13th century.

In the 18th century, the Salve Regina served as the outline for the classic Roman Catholic Mariology book The Glories of Mary by Alphonsus Liguori. In the first part of the book Alphonsus, a Doctor of the Church, discusses the Salve Regina and explains how God gave Mary to mankind as the "Gate of Heaven".

It was added to the series of prayers said at the end of Low Mass by Pope Leo XIII.

The Salve Regina is traditionally sung at the end of a priest's funeral Mass. It is typically sung immediately after the Dismissal.

As a prayer, it is commonly said at the end of the rosary.

== Latin text ==
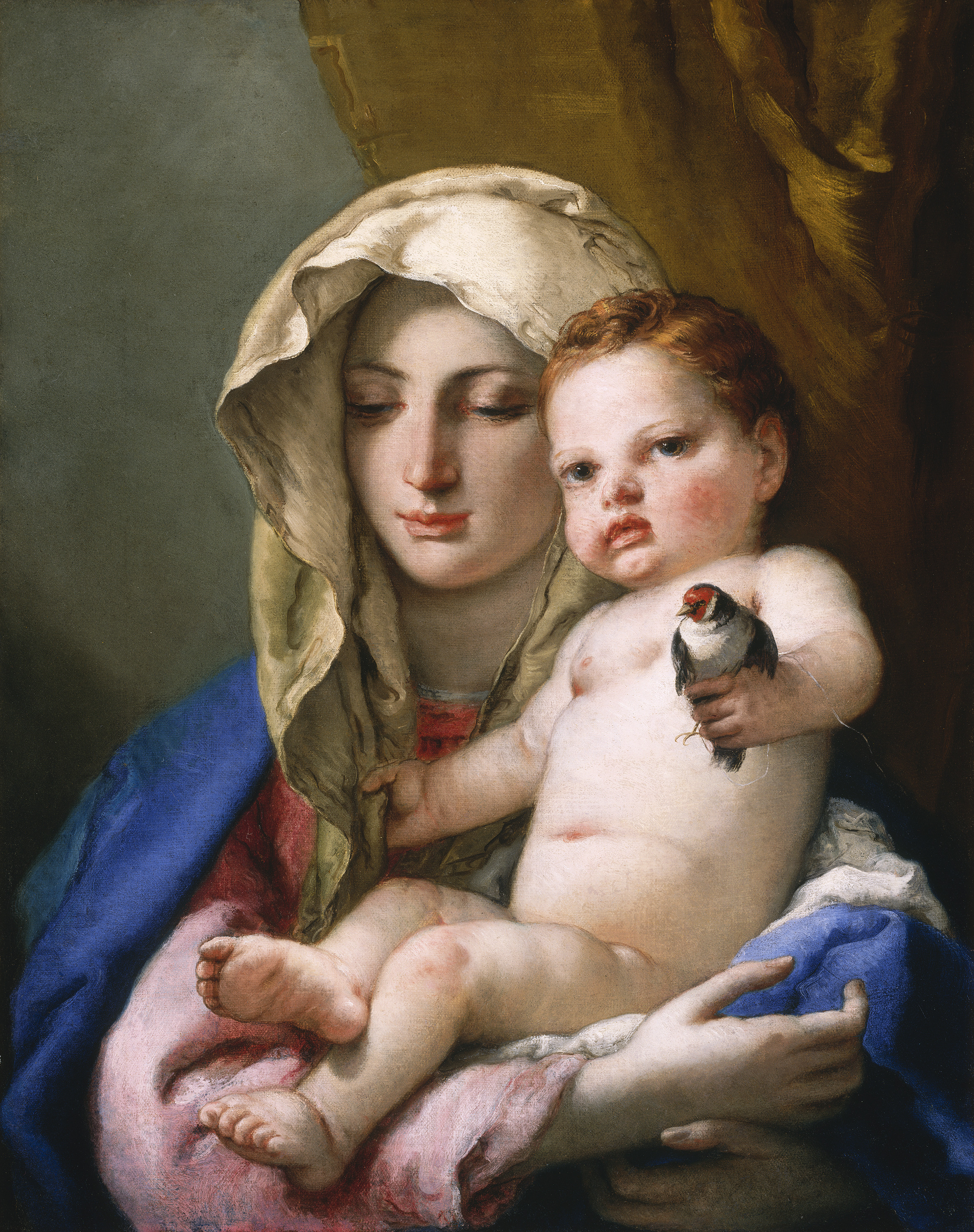
Madonna by Tiepolo, 1760

Salve, Regina, Mater misericordiæ,
vita, dulcedo, et spes nostra, salve
Ad te clamamus exsules filii Hevæ
Ad te suspiramus, gementes et flentes
in hac lacrimarum valle.

Eia, ergo, advocata nostra, illos tuos
misericordes oculos ad nos converte;
Et Iesum, benedictum fructum ventris tui,
nobis post hoc exsilium ostende.
O clemens, O pia, O dulcis Virgo Maria.

In some cases, the following versicle and collect are added:

℣ Ora pro nobis, sancta Dei Genitrix,
℟ Ut digni efficiamur promissionibus Christi.
Oremus.
Omnipotens sempiterne Deus, qui gloriosæ Virginis Matris Mariæ corpus et animam, ut dignum Filii tui habitaculum effici mereretur, Spiritu Sancto cooperante præparasti: da, ut cuius commemoratione lætamur; eius pia intercessione, ab instantibus malis, et a morte perpetua liberemur. Per eundem Christum Dominum nostrum.
℟ Amen.

The current text is almost exactly that of the original; however, the word "Mater" in the first line seems to have been added in the 16th century, and "Virgo" in the final line in the 13th.

== Translations ==
Variations exist among most translations.

=== Traditional English translation ===
Hail, holy Queen, Mother of Mercy,
Hail our life, our sweetness and our hope.
To thee do we cry,
Poor banished children of Eve;
To thee do we send up our sighs,
Mourning and weeping in this valley (or vale) (Note: Valley is more common in North America, while Catholics in the United Kingdom and in the Anglo-Catholic tradition use vale.) of tears.

Turn then, most gracious advocate,
Thine eyes of mercy toward us;
And after this our exile,
Show unto us the blessed fruit of thy womb, Jesus.
O clement, O loving,
O sweet Virgin Mary.

℣ Pray for us, O holy Mother of God,
℟ that we may be made worthy of the promises of Christ.

Let us pray:
Almighty, everlasting God, who by the co-operation of the Holy Spirit didst prepare the body and soul of the glorious Virgin-Mother Mary to become a dwelling-place meet for thy Son: grant that as we rejoice in her commemoration; so by her fervent intercession we may be delivered from present evils and from everlasting death. Through the same Christ our Lord. Amen.

=== Leonine version ===
The Salve Regina was one of the Leonine Prayers, in which context the collect at the end was replaced by different text:

Oremus. Deus, refugium nostrum et virtus, populum ad te clamantem propitius respice; et intercedente gloriosa, et immaculata Virgine Dei Genitrice Maria, cum beato Joseph, ejus Sponso, ac beatis Apostolis tuis Petro et Paulo, et omnibus Sanctis, quas pro conversione peccatorum, pro libertate et exaltatione sanctae Matris Ecclesiae, preces effundimus, misericors et benignus exaudi. Per eundem Christum Dominum nostrum. Amen.

Let us pray. O God, our refuge and our strength, look down with mercy upon the people who cry to Thee; and by the intercession of the glorious and immaculate Virgin Mary, Mother of God, of Saint Joseph her spouse, of the blessed Apostles Peter and Paul, and of all the saints, in Thy mercy and goodness hear our prayers for the conversion of sinners, and for the liberty and exaltation of our Holy Mother the Church. Through the same Christ Our Lord. Amen.

=== Modernized USCCB translation ===
The United States Conference of Catholic Bishops has a more modern translation which is used in the ICEL's translation of the Liturgy of the Hours and is used in the United States and Canada:

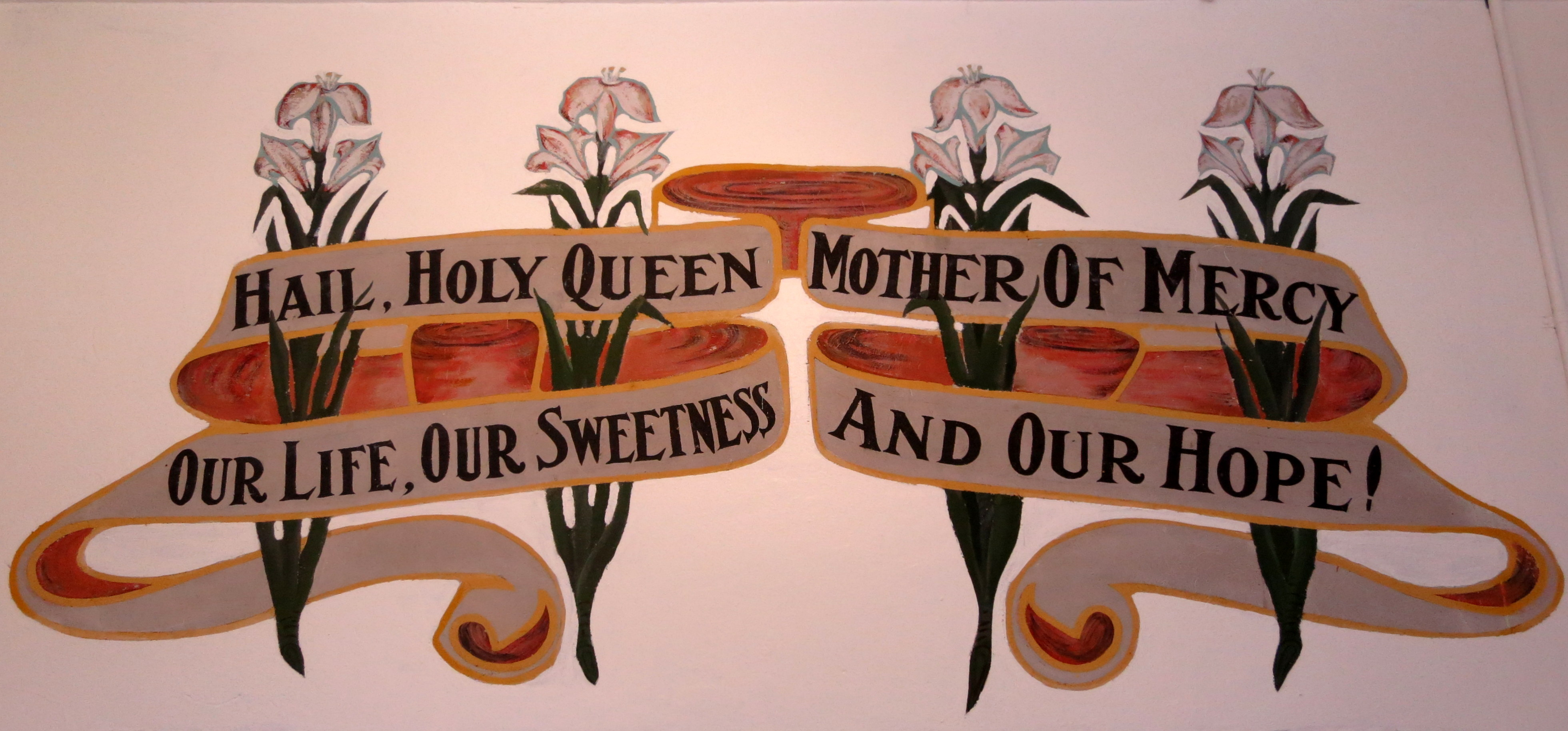
A painting of the prayer inside Sorrowful Mother Shrine Chapel (Bellevue, Ohio)

Hail, holy Queen, mother of mercy,
Hail our life, our sweetness, and our hope.
To you we cry, poor banished children of Eve;
to you we send up our sighs,
mourning and weeping in this valley of tears.

Turn, then, most gracious advocate,
your eyes of mercy toward us;
and after this, our exile,
show unto us the blessed fruit of your womb, Jesus.
O clement, O loving, O sweet Virgin Mary.

℣ Pray for us, O holy Mother of God.
℟ That we may be made worthy of the promises of Christ.

A 1969 translation by James Quinn, beginning "Hail, our Queen and Mother blest," is offered as an alternative to the Latin in the non-ICEL translation of the Liturgy of the Hours (Divine Office) and is used in Australia, England and Wales, Ireland and Scotland.

== Indulgence ==
Pope Pius VI in the decree of 5 April 1786 granted the indulgence of one hundred days and, on Sundays, of 7 years and as many as forty years to anyone with a contrite heart who recited the antiphon Salve Regina in the morning and the evening the Sub tuum praesidium.

This type of indulgences expressed in days or years was suppressed by the Indulgentiarum Doctrina of 1967.

The Enchiridion Indulgentiarum of 2004 provides for partial indulgence.

== Hail, Holy Queen enthroned above ==
Modern version of the 1736 melody.

German priest Johann Georg Seidenbusch published a hymn entitled "Gegrüßet seist du, Königin" in his 1687 devotional book Marianischer Schnee-Berg. This hymn was inspired by the pilgrimage devotions at Aufhausen Priory, and contains various salutations taken predominantly from the Salve Regina.

This hymn was soon to be found in various forms in many Catholic devotional books, and a Latin translation, "Salve Regina coelitum", was soon created. The modern melody first appeared in the 1736 hymnal Geistliche Spiel- und Weckuhr, and Melchior Ludwig Herold's 1808 hymnal Choralmelodien zum Heiligen Gesänge contained the version that is standard today.

The English translation "Hail, Holy Queen enthroned above" first appeared in The Roman Missal in 1884.

Gegrüßet seist du, Königin (1687)	Salve Regina coelitum (1728)	Hail, Holy Queen enthroned above (1884)
Gegrüst seyst du O Königin Salve Regina. Himmels und Erden Kayserin / Salve Maria. Erfreuet euch ihr Cherubin Seraphin / Grüsset eiver Königin / grüsset Mariam. O Mutter der Barmherßigkeit / Salve Regina. Aus allen du gebenedeyt / Salve Maria. Erfreuet euch ihr Cherubin Seraphin / Lobet eiver Königin lobet Mariam. O Leben / und O Süssigkeit Salve Regina. O groß der Mensch - und Engel Fremd Salve Maria. Erfreuet euch ihr Cherubin / Seraphin / Ehret euer Königin / ehret Mariam.	Salve, Regina coelitum, o Maria! Sors unica terrigenum, o Maria! Jubilate, Cherubim, Exsultate, Seraphim! Consonate perpetim: Salve, salve, salve, Regina. Mater misericordiae, o Maria! Dulcis parens clementiae, o Maria! Jubilate, Cherubim, Exsultate, Seraphim! Consonate perpetim: Salve, salve, salve, Regina.	Hail, Holy Queen enthroned above, O Maria! Hail, Mother of mercy and of love, O Maria! Triumph all ye cherubim! Sing with us ye seraphim! Heaven and earth resound the hymn! Salve, salve, salve, Regina! Our life, our sweetness here below, O Maria! Our hope in sorrow and in woe, O Maria! Triumph all ye cherubim! Sing with us ye seraphim! Heaven and earth resound the hymn! Salve, salve, salve, Regina! And when our last breath leaves us, O Maria! Show us thy son Christ Jesus, O Maria! Triumph all ye cherubim! Sing with us ye seraphim! Heaven and earth resound the hymn! Salve, salve, salve, Regina!

== Musical settings ==
As an essential component of the Compline service, the hymn has been set to music by various composers, including Victoria, Palestrina, Josquin and Lassus. Charpentier, (5 settings, H.18, H.47, H.23, H.24, H.27), Louis-Nicolas Clérambault, (C.114), Giovanni Battista Pergolesi (3 settings), Nicola Porpora (3 settings), Alessandro Scarlatti, Vivaldi, Jan Dismas Zelenka, (7 settings, ZWV 135-141, and ZWV 204), Johann Adolph Hasse (3 settings), Handel, and Liszt composed their own settings in later years. Schubert composed no fewer than seven versions. Francis Poulenc composed his setting of the text in 1941. Arvo Pärt composed a setting first performed in the Essen Cathedral in 2002. Olivier Latry premiered in 2007 an organ work Salve Regina which reflects in seven movements the lines of the hymn in Gregorian chant.

== In popular culture ==
In 1976 the words of the first verse of the Salve Regina were used as a repeating theme in the song "Oh What a Circus" in the musical Evita, with music by Andrew Lloyd Webber and lyrics by Tim Rice.

Salve Regina University, a U.S. university established by the Sisters of Mercy in 1934, was named in honor of the Salve Regina hymn and motto.

The hymn is sung (using the English translation "Hail, Holy Queen enthroned above") by a choir of nuns in the 1992 comedy film Sister Act, starring Whoopi Goldberg. In the film, the hymn is initially sung in the traditional style, before shifting into an uptempo, soul and gospel music–influenced arrangement. This arrangement has a bridge that intersperses lines from another Marian hymn, O sanctissima, as well as the first lines of the Sanctus (a prayer recited at Mass).

== See also ==
- Dialogues of the Carmelites
- Lumen gentium
- Marian devotions
- Queen of Heaven
- Salve Regina University
