= List of Catholic hymns =

This is a list of original Roman Catholic hymns. The list does not contain hymns originating from other Christian traditions despite occasional usage in Roman Catholic churches. The list has hymns in Latin and English.

== A ==
- A Message Came to A Maiden Young
- Accept Almighty Father
- Adeste Fideles
- Adoramus te
- Adoro te devote
- Agnus Dei
- All Glory, Laud and Honour
- All of seeing, all of hearing
- Alleluia! Alleluia! Praise the Lord
- Alleluia! Alleluia! Sing a New Song to the Lord
- Alleluia! Sing to Jesus
- Alma Redemptoris Mater
- Angels We Have Heard on High
- Anima Christi (Soul of my Saviour)
- Asperges me
- As a Deer
- As I Kneel Before You (also known as Maria Parkinson's Ave Maria)
- At That First Eucharist
- At the Lamb's High Feast We Sing
- At the Name of Jesus
- Attende Domine
- Aurora lucis rutilat
- Ave Maria
- Ave maris stella
- Ave Sanctissima
- Ave verum corpus

== B ==
- Be Joyful Mary
- Be Forgiven
- Be Thou My Vision
- Behold a simple tender Babe
- Before the Sun Burned Bright
- Blessed Are They
- Break Forth, O Beauteous Heav'nly Light
- Bring Flowers of the Fairest (Queen of the May)

== C ==
- Canticle of Simeon (Nunc dimittis)
- Canticle of the Blessed Virgin (Magnificat)
- Canticle of the Turning
- Canticle of the Three Children
- Careworn Mother Stood Attending
- Come, Creator Spirit
- Come Down, O Love Divine
- Come, Holy Ghost
- Come, Lord, and Tarry Not
- Come My Way, My Truth, My Life
- Come, rejoice Before Your Maker
- Come, Thou Holy Spirit, Come
- Come To Me
- Come To My Mercy
- Come, Ye Faithful, Raise the Strain
- Comfort, Comfort Ye My People
- Conditor alme siderum
- Creator of the Earth and Skies
- Creator Spirit, By Whose Aid
- Crown Him With Many Crowns
- Cry Out With Joy
- Come Lord, Maranatha

== D ==
- Daughter of a Mighty Father
- Dies irae
- Dio vi salvi Regina

== E ==
- Emmanuel
- Evviva Maria

== F ==
- Faith Of Our Fathers
- Father, We Thank Thee
- For All The Saints

== G ==
- Gaude Maria Virgo
- Gift of Finest Wheat
- Gloria in excelsis Deo
- Glory to God in the Highest
- God of Mercy and Compassion
- Guardian Angel, from heaven so bright

== H ==
- Heart of Jesus
- Help of Christians, guard this land
- Holy God, We Praise Thy Name
- Hail Queen of Heaven, the Ocean Star

== I ==
- I Am the Bread of Life
- In dulci jubilo
- Immaculate Mary
- L-Innu Malti
- In Splendoribus Sanctorum
- Iste confessor

== J ==
- Jesu dulcis memoria
- Jesu, Jesu
- Jesus, in your Heart we find

== L ==
- Lauda Sion
- Laudate Dominum
- Laudate omnes gentes
- Let All Mortal Flesh Keep Silence
- Little Hymn to Saint Joseph
- Lo, How a Rose E'er Blooming
- Lucis creator optime
- Lumen Christi

== M ==
- Magnificat
- Mary Immaculate, Star of the Morning
- May Flights of Angels Lead You on Your Way
- Mō Maria
- Mother Dear
- Mother Dearest, Mother Fairest
- Mountains May Fall

== N ==
- Nunc dimittis

== O ==
- O bread of heaven
- O Come, All Ye Faithful
- O Deus ego amo te
- O filii et filiæ
- O Lord I am Not Worthy
- O Mother of perpetual help
- On Eagle's Wings
- O salutaris hostia
- O sanctissima
- O sodales
- O Antiphons

== P ==
- Pange lingua gloriosi corporis mysterium
- Pange lingua gloriosi proelium certaminis
- Panis angelicus
- Parce Domine
- Piae Cantiones
- Pontifical Anthem

== R ==
- Regina caeli
- Requiem aeternam
- Rerum Creator Optime
- Rex Sempiterne Cælitum
- Rorate caeli

== S ==
- Sacra jam splendent
- Salve Regina
- Sancti venite
- Sanctorum Meritis
- Sanctus, Sanctus, Sanctus
- Stabat Mater
- Sing Praise To Our Creator
- Sing, sing, ye angel bands
- Soul of My Savior
- Surrexit Christus hodie
- Sweet Sacrament Divine

== T ==
- Tantum ergo
- Te Deum
- Te lucis ante terminum
- There's a Wideness in God's Mercy
- They'll Know We Are Christians
- This day he gave to me
- Thou Lady bright

== U ==
- Ubi caritas

== V ==
- Veni Creator Spiritus
- Veni redemptor gentium
- Veni Sancte Spiritus
- Vexilla Regis
- Victimae paschali laudes
- Vidi aquam
- Vox clara ecce intonat

== W ==
- Water of Life
- We Praise You, Father For Your Gifts
- Where Charity and Love Prevail

== See also ==
- Category:German-language Catholic hymns
