= Scholtes =

Scholtes is a surname. Notable people with the surname include:

- Brigitte Scholtes (born 1958), German radio journalist
- Peter Scholtes (1938–2009), American Roman Catholic priest and writer
- Richard Scholtes, United States Army general
- Tessy Scholtes (born 1981), Luxembourgian karateka and politician

== See also ==
- Scholtès, a former French company, now a brand of Indesit Company
