= Bread of Life Discourse =

Parable in the Gospel according to John

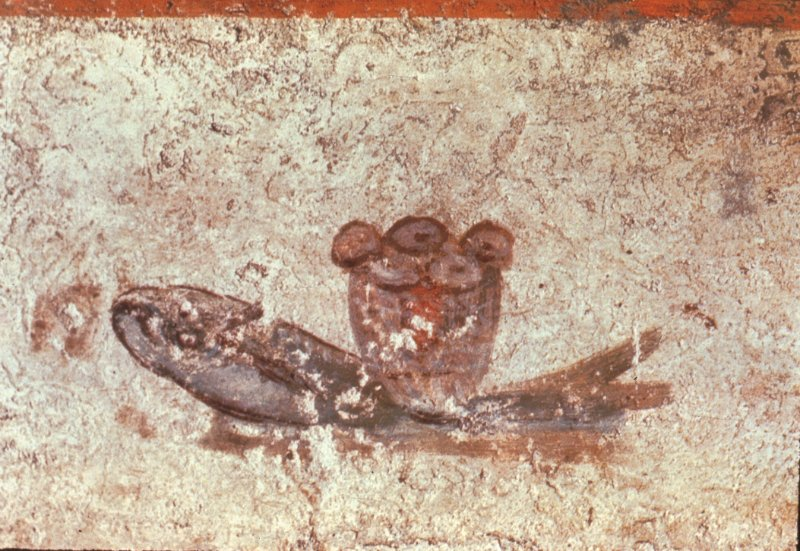
Early third century depiction of eucharistic bread and fish, Catacomb of San Callisto, Rome

The Bread of Life Discourse is a portion of the teaching of Jesus which appears in chapter 6 of John's Gospel (verses 22–59) and was delivered in the synagogue at Capernaum.

The title "Bread of Life" (Ancient Greek: ἄρτος τῆς ζωῆς, artos tēs zōēs) given to Jesus is based on this biblical passage, which is set in the gospel shortly after the feeding the multitude episode (in which Jesus feeds a crowd of 5,000 people with five loaves of bread and two fish), after which he walks on the water to the western side of Sea of Galilee and the crowd follow by boat in search of him.

John's Gospel does not include an account of the blessing of the bread during the Last Supper as in the synoptic gospels e.g. Luke 22:19. Nonetheless, this discourse has often been interpreted as communicating teachings regarding the Eucharist which have been very influential in the Christian tradition.

== Biblical account ==
In the central part of this discourse:

Jesus said to them, "Very truly, I tell you, it was not Moses who gave you the bread from heaven, but it is my Father who gives you the true bread from heaven. For the bread of God is that which comes down from heaven and gives life to the world." They said to him, "Sir, give us this bread always." Jesus said to them, "I am the bread of life. Whoever comes to me will never be hungry, and whoever believes in me will never be thirsty."

— John 6:32–35, New Revised Standard Version.

The reference to the bread given by Moses concerns the manna given to the people of Israel in the desert, recorded in Exodus 16. Psalm 78 asserts that He (i.e. God) had "rained down manna upon them to eat". Albert Barnes reflects that "this was regarded as a miraculous interference in their behalf, and an attestation of the divine mission of Moses, and hence they said familiarly that Moses gave it to them".

== Church Fathers ==
The Liturgy of the Eucharist, from the earliest days, was performed behind closed doors out of fear of persecution. One of the earliest explanations of the Eucharist given on behalf of a Christian to the larger contemporary community is given by Justin Martyr in his First Apology to the Roman Emperor Antoninus Pius:

"We call this food Eucharist, and no one else is permitted to partake of it, except one who believes our teaching to be true and who has been washed in the washing which is for the remission of sins and for regeneration [i.e., has received baptism] and is thereby living as Christ enjoined. For not as common bread nor common drink do we receive these; but since Jesus Christ our Savior was made incarnate by the word of God and had both flesh and blood for our salvation, so too, as we have been taught, the food which has been made into the Eucharist by the Eucharistic prayer set down by him, and by the change of which our blood and flesh is nurtured, is both the flesh and the blood of that incarnated Jesus." —(First Apology 66 [A.D. 151]).

Ignatius of Antioch, a disciple of John the Apostle (the author of the gospel of John), first-century Christian writer and Patriarch of Antioch, explains the common understanding of the Eucharist as truly the body and blood of Jesus Christ in a letter written c. 110 AD:

Take note of those who hold heterodox opinions on the grace of Jesus Christ which has come to us, and see how contrary their opinions are to the mind of God…They abstain from the Eucharist and from prayer because they do not confess that the Eucharist is the flesh of our Savior Jesus Christ, flesh which suffered for our sins and which that Father, in his goodness, raised up again. They who deny the gift of God are perishing in their disputes.

— Ignatius of Antioch, Letter to the Smyrnaeans 6:2-7:1

This orthodox understanding is further affirmed by Irenaeus of Lyon in his famous work "Against Heresies" where he asks rhetorically "If the Lord were from other than the Father, how could he rightly take bread, which is of the same creation as our own, and confess it to be his body and affirm that the mixture in the cup is his blood?" (Against Heresies 4:32-33).

Cyril of Jerusalem, a fourth-century Christian writer and bishop of Jerusalem during the Arian controversy, explains that "the bread and the wine of the Eucharist before the holy invocation of the adorable Trinity were simple bread and wine, but the invocation having been made, the bread becomes the body of Christ and the wine the blood of Christ" (Catechetical Lectures 19:7).

Augustine of Hippo in his Tractate on John 6 teaches that Jesus was speaking mystically and not carnally (that is, not solely physically): by eating his flesh and drinking his blood the Church not merely be consuming Jesus' body and blood, but would be ritually united with Christ. Augustine elsewhere teaches that the bread and wine is the same body that Jesus gave up and the same blood that he shed on the cross.

"I promised you [new Christians], who have now been baptized, a sermon in which I would explain the sacrament of the Lord’s Table….That bread which you see on the altar, having been sanctified by the word of God, is the body of Christ. That chalice, or rather, what is in that chalice, having been sanctified by the word of God, is the blood of Christ"

— Augustine of Hippo, Sermons 227

John Chrysostom, in his Homily 47 on the Gospel of John, teaches that Jesus' words are not an enigma or a parable, but are to be taken literally.

== Writings in the modern era ==
An expanded form of wording, "I am the bread that gives life", appears in several modern translations of John 6:35.

Cornelius a Lapide comments on the words "comes down", writing: "not in the past, but the present tense. The Greek is καταβαίνων, the present participle. The expression therefore signifies the perpetual descent of Christ upon the Eucharistic altar even to the end of the world. For whensoever the priest consecrates the Eucharist, Christ, who after His death ascended into heaven, comes down from thence to the consecrated species of bread, and in them declares His presence."

Friedrich Justus Knecht gives the typical Roman Catholic interpretation of the promises of Jesus in these passages, writing: "He promised to give us a food, the effects of which would not be passing, but would endure for ever. This Food is Himself: He is the living and life-giving Food which came down from heaven. He promised to give His Flesh for the life of the world, and to offer this His Flesh to be our Food. When the Jews were scandalized at the idea of His giving His Flesh to be eaten, He did not say to them: "You have misunderstood Me." On the contrary, He reaffirmed the very thing which had scandalized them, and asserted repeatedly that His Flesh was meat indeed and His Blood drink indeed, and that those only will have life who eat His Flesh and drink His Blood; though, at the same time, He signified that the Flesh which He would give to be our Food was His glorified Body. When many of His disciples were still offended at the idea of His giving His Flesh to eat, and refused to believe His words, our Lord preferred to let them go, rather than retract or explain away one syllable of the words He had spoken. It is therefore undeniably true that our Lord promised to give His Body, His Flesh and Blood, to be the Food of His servants... Our Lord fulfilled it a year later at the Last Supper."

Meredith J. C. Warren and Jan Heilmann have challenged the Eucharistic interpretation of this passage. Warren argues that it reflects ancient Mediterranean traditions of sacrificial meals that identify a hero with a divinity. Heilmann argues that the imagery of eating the flesh of Jesus and drinking his blood is to be understood against the background of the conceptual metaphor.

In the Christological context, the use of the Bread of Life title is similar to the Light of the World title in John 8:12, where Jesus states: "I am the light of the world: he who follows me shall not walk in darkness, but shall have the light of life." These assertions build on the Christological theme of John 5:26, where Jesus claims to possess life just as the Father does and provides it to those who follow him. The alternative wording, "bread of God", appears in John 6:33, but not elsewhere in the New Testament.

== See also ==
- Farewell Discourse
- I am (biblical term)
- "I Am the Bread of Life"
- Last Supper
- Life of Jesus in the New Testament
- Light of the World
- Water of Life Discourse
