= Proclamation of the Birth of Christ =

Chant sung in the Catholic church

The Proclamation of the Birth of Christ, Kalenda Proclamation, or Christmas Proclamation, is a chant sung before the Midnight Mass for Christmas in the Roman Rite of the Catholic Church, as well as some Anglican churches. The long text is a timeline, in which each verse represents the years from an historical event, either secular or religious, until birth of Jesus Christ, and the number of years – expressed in centuries or years – decreases until the day of the first Christmas.

== Ceremonial ==
Originating from the Roman Martyrology, traditionally read during the hour of Prime, the proclamation places the birth of Christ "within the context of salvation history." Prime was suppressed as part of the liturgical reforms following Vatican II, but Pope John Paul II restored the usage of the Proclamation during the 1980 Papal Christmas Midnight Mass. Since then, many parishes re-instituted the Proclamation as well.

In the Ordinary Form of the Roman Rite, the Christmas Proclamation is chanted during Midnight Mass.

== Translations ==
As the official Latin text of the Roman Martyrology has been updated, the English translation of the Proclamation has changed as well.

=== 1584 text ===
Latin text	English translation
Octavo Kalendas Januarii. Luna ...	The twenty-fifth of December. The ... day of the Moon.
Anno a creatione mundi, quando in principio Deus creavit cælum et terram, quinquies millesimo centesimo nonagesimo nono;	In the year, from the creation of the world, when in the beginning God created Heaven and earth, five thousand one hundred and ninety-nine;
a diluvio autem, anno bis millesimo nongentesimo quinquagesimo septimo;	from the flood, two thousand nine hundred and fifty-seven;
a nativitate Abrahæ, anno bis millesimo quintodecimo;	from the birth of Abraham, two thousand and fifteen;
a Moyse et egressu populi Israël de Ægypto, anno millesimo quingentesimo decimo;	from Moses and the coming of the Israelites out of Egypt, one thousand five hundred and ten;
ab unctione David in Regem, anno millesimo trigesimo secundo;	from the anointing of King David, one thousand and thirty-two;
Hebdomada sexagesima quinta, juxta Danielis prophetiam;	in the sixty-fifth week, according to the prophecy of Daniel;
Olympiade centesima nonagesima quarta;	in the one hundred and ninety-fourth Olympiad;
ab urbe Roma condita, anno septingentesimo quinquagesimo secundo;	in the year seven hundred and fifty-two from the founding of the city of Rome;
anno Imperii Octaviani Augusti quadragesimo secundo;	in the forty-second year of the empire of Octavian Augustus,
toto orbe in pace composito, sexta mundi ætate, Jesus Christus, æternus Deus æternique Patris Filius, mundum volens adventu suo piissimo consecrare, de Spiritu Sancto conceptus, novemque post conceptionem decursis mensibus, in Bethlehem Judæ nascitur ex Maria Virgine factus Homo.	when the whole world was at peace, in the sixth age of the world, Jesus Christ, eternal God, and Son of the eternal Father, desirous to sanctify the world by His most merciful coming, having been conceived of the Holy Ghost, and nine months having elapsed since His conception, is born in Bethlehem of Juda, having become Man of the Virgin Mary.
Nativitas Domini nostri Jesu Christi secundum carnem.	The Nativity of Our Lord Jesus Christ according to the flesh.

=== Current text ===
Latin text	United States Conference of Catholic Bishops English text
Octavo Kalendas Januarii Luna N.	The Twenty-fifth Day of December,
Innumeris transactis saeculis a creatione mundi, quando in principio Deus creavit caelum et terram et hominem formavit ad imaginem suam;	when ages beyond number had run their course from the creation of the world, when God in the beginning created heaven and earth, and formed man in his own likeness;
permultis etiam saeculis, ex quo post diluvium Altissimus in nubibus arcum posuerat, signum fœderis et pacis;	when century upon century had passed since the Almighty set his bow in the clouds after the Great Flood, as a sign of covenant and peace;
a migratione Abrahæ, patris nostri in fide, de Ur Chaldæorum saeculo vigesimo primo;	in the twenty-first century since Abraham, our father in faith, came out of Ur of the Chaldees;
ab egressu populi Israël de Ægypto, Moyse duce, saeculo decimo tertio;	in the thirteenth century since the People of Israel were led by Moses in the Exodus from Egypt;
ab unctione David in regem, anno circiter millesimo;	around the thousandth year since David was anointed King;
hebdomada sexagesima quinta, juxta Danielis prophetiam;	in the sixty-fifth week of the prophecy of Daniel;
Olympiade centesima nonagesima quarta;	in the one hundred and ninety-fourth Olympiad;
ab Urbe condita anno septingentesimo quinquagesimo secundo;	in the year seven hundred and fifty-two since the foundation of the City of Rome;
anno imperii Cæsaris Octaviani Augusti quadragesimo secundo;	in the forty-second year of the reign of Caesar Octavian Augustus,
toto orbe in pace composito, Jesus Christus, æternus Deus æternique Patris Filius, mundum volens adventu suo piissimo consecrare, de Spiritu Sancto conceptus, novemque post conceptionem decursis mensibus, in Bethlehem Judæ nascitur ex Maria Virgine factus homo:	the whole world being at peace, Jesus Christ, eternal God and Son of the eternal Father, desiring to consecrate the world by his most loving presence, was conceived by the Holy Spirit, and when nine months had passed since his conception, was born of the Virgin Mary in Bethlehem of Judah, and was made man:
Nativitas Domini nostri Jesu Christi secundum carnem.	The Nativity of Our Lord Jesus Christ according to the flesh.

== See also ==
- Exsultet
- Catholic liturgy
- Koliada
