= List of Old Covenant saints in the Roman Martyrology =

The Roman Martyrology, which is a non-exhaustive list of saints venerated by the Catholic Church, includes the following feast days for saints who died before Pentecost, and therefore are considered saints of the Old Covenant. Unlike modern saints, these Biblical figures did not go through any formal process of canonization.

== Old Testament ==
Saint	Feast Day	Notes
Jeremiah	May 01	
Isaiah	May 09	
Job	May 10	
Elisha	June 14	
Amos	June 15	
Aaron	July 01	
Ezra	July 13	
Elijah	July 20	
Ezekiel	July 23	
Seven Holy Brothers	August 01	
Eleazar	August 01	
Samuel	August 20	
Melchizedek	August 26	
Joshua	September 01	
Moses	September 04	
Zechariah	September 06	
Jonah	September 21	
Gideon	September 26	
Abraham	October 09	
Hosea	October 17	
Joel	October 19	
Obadiah	November 19	
Nahum	December 01	
Habakkuk	December 02	
Zephaniah	December 03	
Haggai	December 16	
Micah	December 21	
All Holy Ancestors of Christ	December 24	
David	December 29	

== New Testament ==
Although these saints are from the New Testament, they are nevertheless considered "Old Covenant" saints, because they died before the inauguration of the Catholic Church at Pentecost.

Saint	Feast Day	Notes
Simeon	February 03	
Anna	February 03	
Saint Dismas	March 25	
Saint John the Baptist	June 24	Nativity
Joachim	July 26	
Anne	July 26	
Saint John the Baptist	August 29	Beheading
Zechariah	September 23	
Elizabeth	September 23	
Holy Innocents	December 28	

== See also ==
- Roman Martyrology
- Martyrology
- List of Catholic saints
- List of early Christian saints
- Calendar of saints
