= Midnight Mass =

First liturgy of Christmastide that is celebrated on the night of Christmas Eve

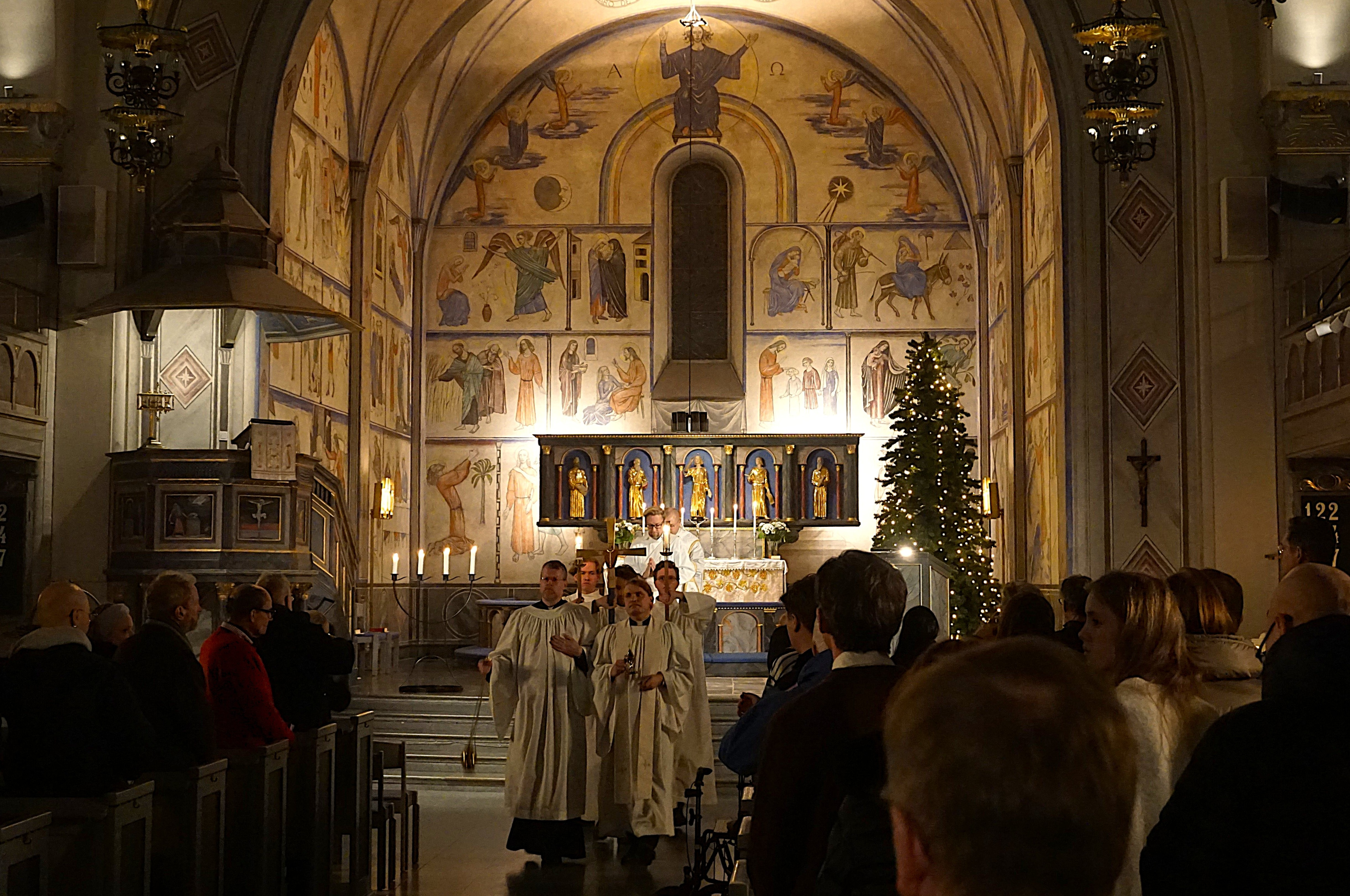
Midnight Mass being celebrated at St. Matthew's Evangelical-Lutheran Church in Stockholm, Sweden

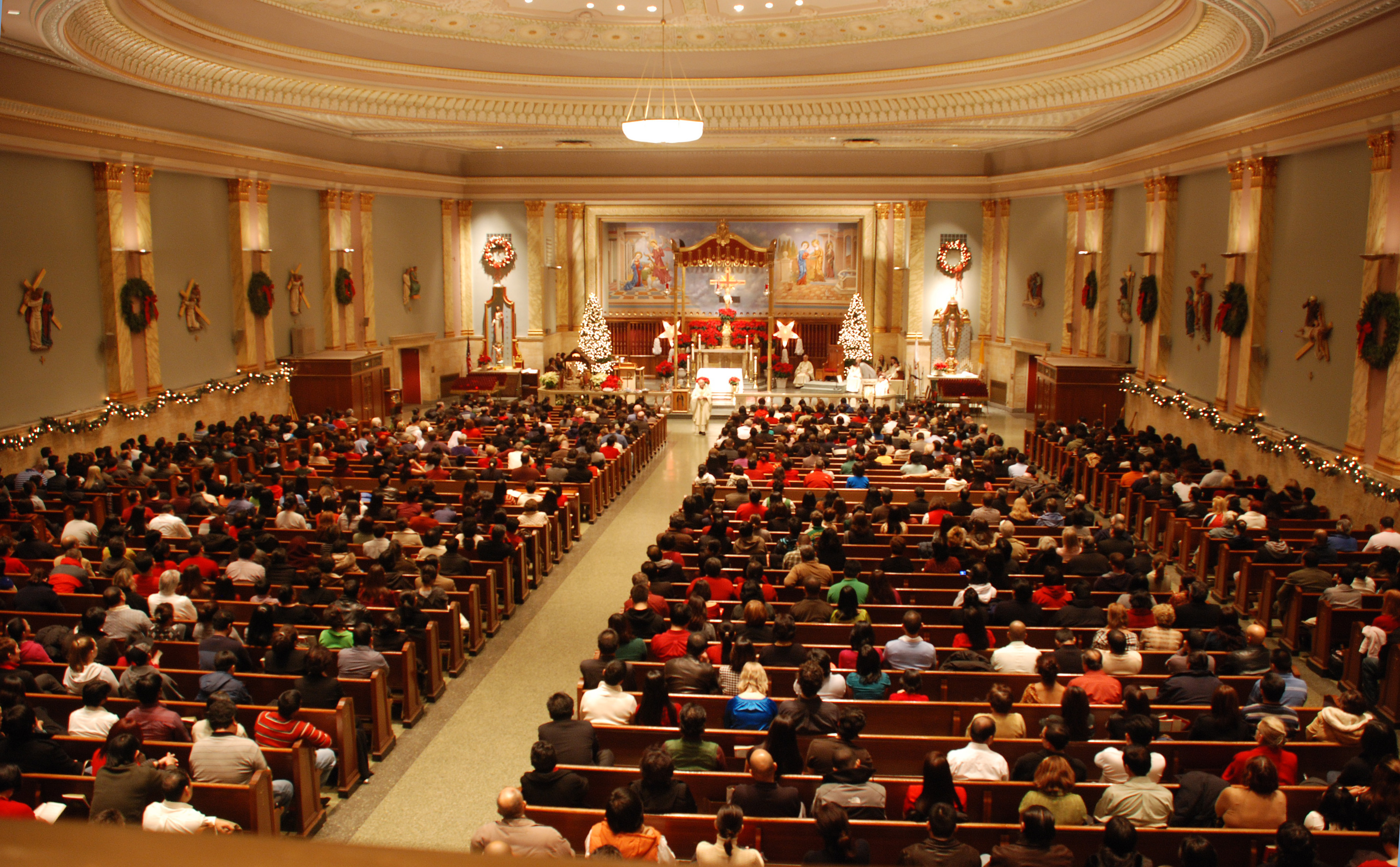
Midnight Mass at St. Sebastian Roman Catholic Church, New York City

In many Western Christian traditions, Midnight Mass is the first liturgy of Christmastide that is celebrated on the night of Christmas Eve, traditionally beginning at midnight when Christmas Eve gives way to Christmas Day. This popular Christmas custom is a jubilant celebration of the Mass or service of worship in honour of the Nativity of Jesus; even many of those Christian denominations that do not regularly employ the word Mass uniquely use the term "Midnight Mass" for their Christmas Eve liturgy as it includes the celebration of Holy Communion.

== History ==
The tradition of midnight Mass on Christmas Eve was first chronicled by Egeria, a Galician woman who went on a pilgrimage to the Holy Land around 381. She witnessed how the early Catholics of Jerusalem honored the Christmas mystery with a midnight vigil at Bethlehem. This was followed by a torchlight procession to Jerusalem, arriving at the Church of the Resurrection at dawn. The tradition reached the Western world in 430 under Pope Sixtus III in the Basilica of St Mary Major. He instituted the practice of a midnight Mass after the cockcrow in the grotto-like oratory of the famed Basilica of Santa Maria Maggiore. There are discrepancies, however, as to the exact time of the cockcrow due to the fact that the ancient Romans set it at the start of the day.

By the twelfth century, the practice of midnight Mass had become more widespread as all priests had been granted the faculty of celebrating three Masses on Christmas Day (previously reserved to the Pope), provided the three different propers were celebrated at their appropriate times of midnight, dawn and day.

In 1587, the head priest of the Church of San Agustin de Acolman in Mexico, Diego de Soria, petitioned Pope Sixtus V to allow the Mass to be held outdoors because the church could not accommodate the large number of attendees at the evening celebration.

== Traditions ==
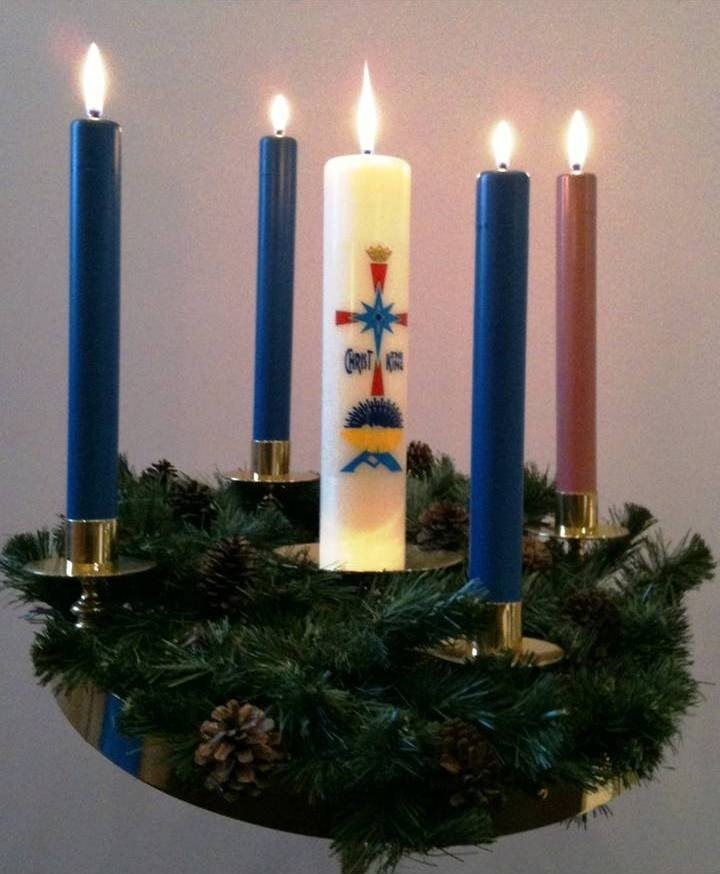
On Christmas Eve, the Advent wreath is traditionally completed with the lighting of the Christ Candle in many church services.

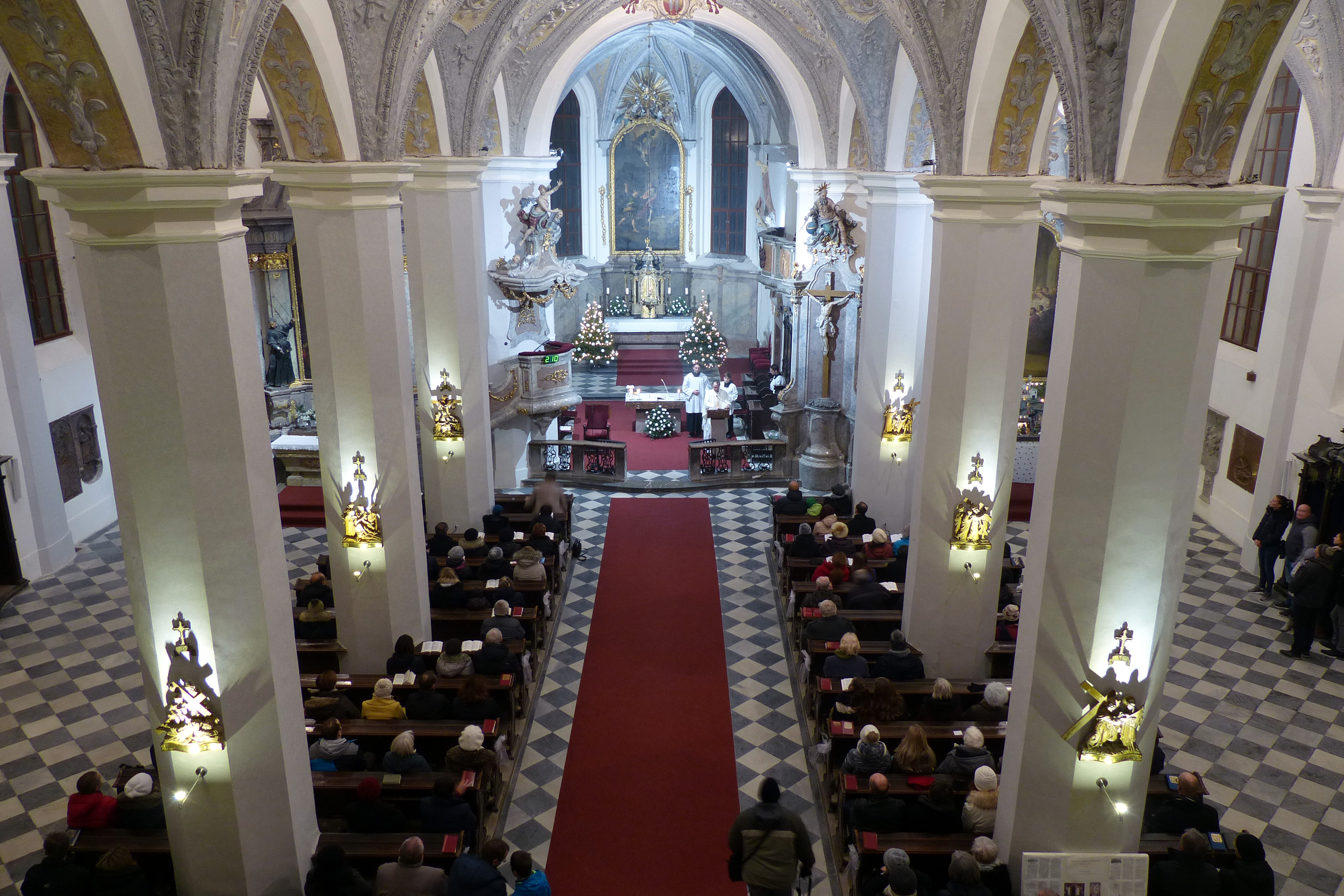
Midnight Mass at Church of St. Wenceslaus in Mikulov, Czech Republic

=== Roman Catholicism ===
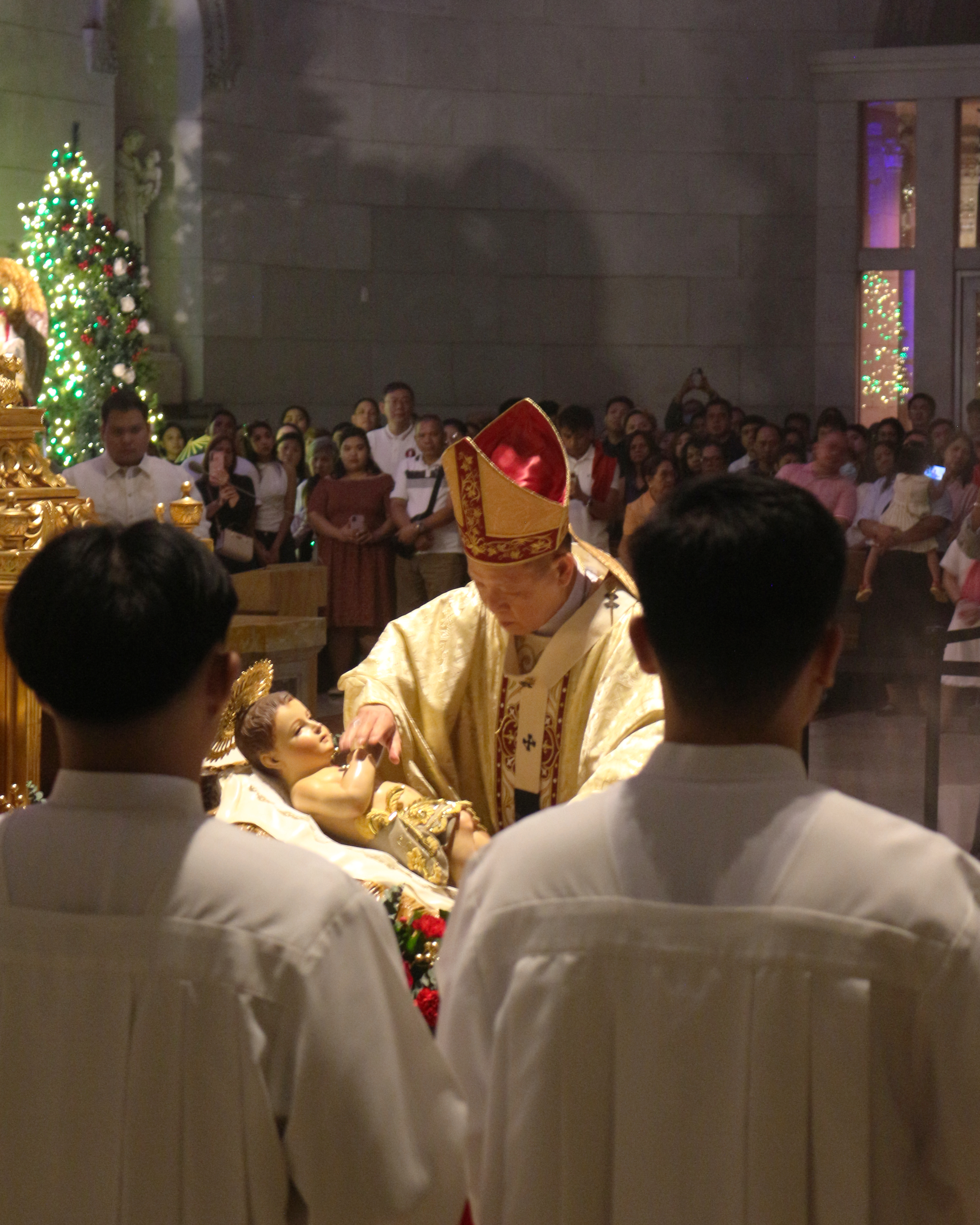
Cardinal Jose Advincula enthrones the Infant Jesus at the Manila Cathedral sanctuary at the beginning of a Roman Catholic midnight Mass.

The Roman liturgy for the Midnight Mass starts with an overview of salvation history, the Proclamation of the Birth of Christ.

Roman Catholics have traditionally celebrated Midnight Mass with church services beginning at midnight, although the Mass itself is officially called Missa in nocte (Ad Missam in nocte) or Mass during the Night in English and need not start at midnight, as has been the case in the Vatican since 2009, first at 10:00 pm, then subsequently earlier in the evening.

In Splendoribus Sanctorum is used for the Communion chant during traditional Catholic midnight mass.

=== Lutheranism ===
Lutherans often observe Midnight Mass in addition to Christmas Vespers and Matins. In his famous work, Cérémonies et coutumes religieuses de tous les peuples du monde, Bernard Picart describes the Lutheran Midnight Mass:

In some Lutheran Countries, the People go to Church on the Night of the Nativity of our Blessed Saviour with lighted Candles, or Wax-Tapers in their Hands. The Faithful who are met together in the Church, spend the whole Night there in singing, and saying their Prayers by the Light of them. Sometimes they burn such a large Quantity of Incense, that the Smoke thereof ascends in the Form of a Whirlwind, and their Devotees may properly enough be said to be wrapt up in it.

=== Anglicanism ===
Churches of the Anglican Communion also traditionally celebrate Midnight Communion for Christmas at 11 or 11:30 pm.

=== Methodism ===
Methodist observations vary as many hold services at 11 p.m. which involve the ringing of church bells when the stroke of midnight is reached.

=== Presbyterianism ===
The Church of Scotland observes a service just before midnight which involves the singing of carols, although it does not include Mass and is called a watchnight service (held elsewhere on New Year's Eve).

=== Eastern Christian traditions ===
While Midnight Mass is not observed in Eastern traditions, All-Night Vigil is common on Christmas Eve and involves the celebration of Matins, the hour which is traditionally observed at midnight.

== Misa de Gallo ==
Misa de Gallo
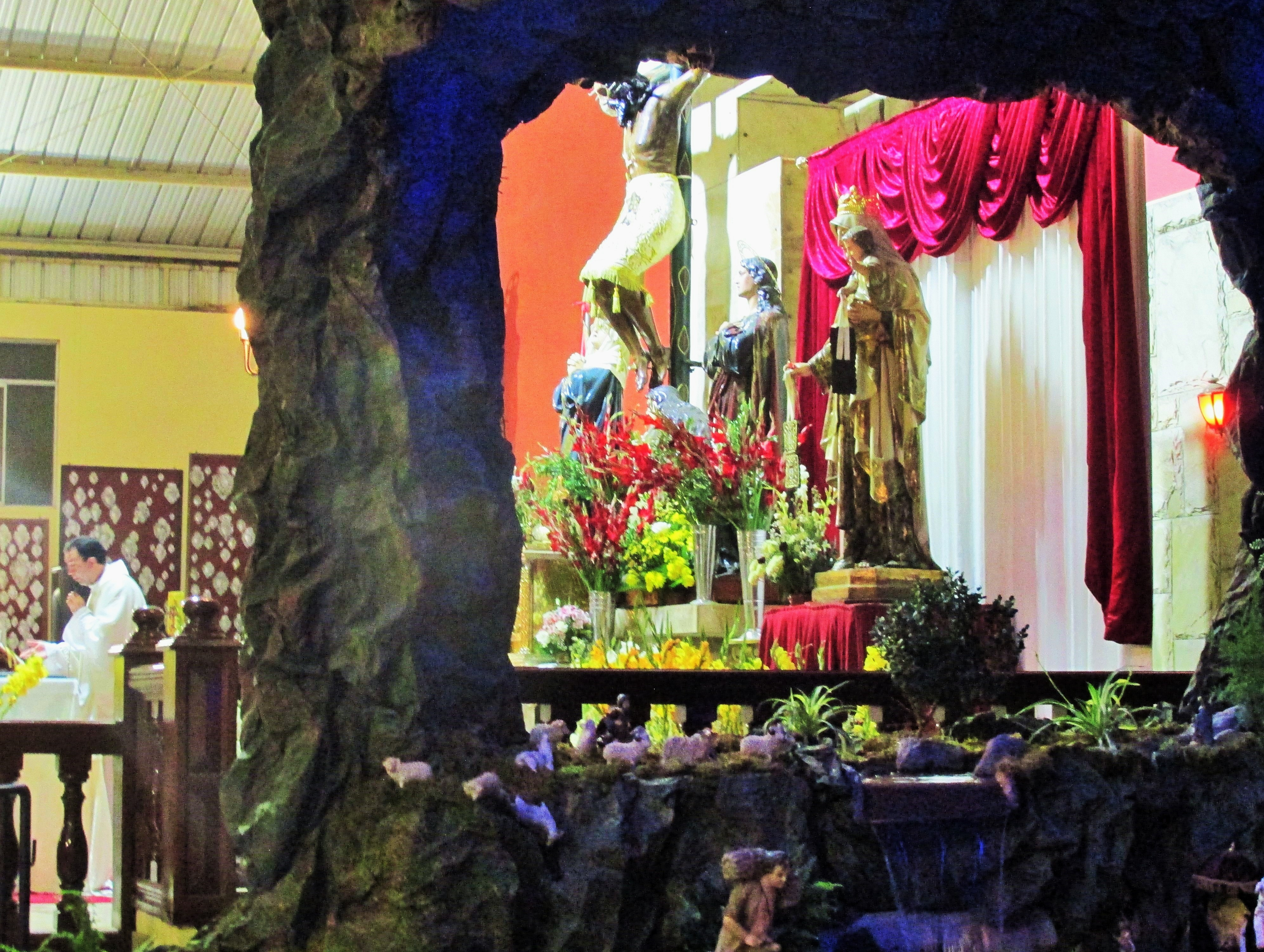
- Altar decorated for a Misa de Gallo
- Also called: Rooster's Mass; Shepherd's Mass
- Observed by: Roman Catholics
- Significance: Advent season
- Begins: December 16
- Ends: December 24
- Date: December 24
- Related to: Misa de Aguinaldo; Christmas Day

Misa de Gallo (Spanish for "Rooster's Mass", also Misa de los Pastores, "Shepherds' Mass;" Portuguese: Missa do Galo; Catalan: Missa del gall) is the Midnight Mass celebrated in Portugal and many former Portuguese colonies and also in Spain and many former Spanish colonies on Christmas Eve and sometimes in the days immediately preceding Christmas. The tradition of Misa de Gallo is still observed today, mostly by Spanish-speaking Roman Catholic countries in Latin America and in the Philippines.

=== Spain ===
In Spain, locals begin Christmas Eve by lighting small oil lamps in every home, then proceed to church to hear Midnight Mass.

The most popular of these holy services is in the Basílica de Montserrat also known as Santa Maria de Montserrat, a Benedictine monastery built on the steep cliffs of the Montserrat mountain range. The Escolania de Montserrat, Europe's oldest boys' choir known for their angelic voices, graces the celebration.

=== Bolivia ===
Bolivians attend Christmas Eve Mass, and the celebration is followed by a sit-down meal featuring a traditional bowl of picana del pollo. It is a stew made of chicken with peas, carrots, and potatoes.

=== Philippines ===
Simbang Gabi (Tagalog for "Night Mass"), also called Misa de Aguinaldo ("gift mass"), is the Filipino version of the Misa de Gallo. It traditionally begins on December 16 and ends on December 24. In most parts of Philippines, however, the term "Misa de Gallo" specifically only refers to the last mass on Christmas Eve. In Zamboangueño Chavacano, the series of masses is also called Misa de los Pastores.

Simbang Gabi is associated with a nine-day novena procession, as well as a reenactment of the search for lodgings by Joseph and the pregnant Virgin Mary known as the Panunulúyan.

=== Puerto Rico ===
In Puerto Rico, locals celebrate Mass by singing Christmas songs, which they call aguinaldos. The more religious versions of these songs are called villancicos and the ones with a Criollo inspiration are called décimas navideñas.

=== Venezuela ===
In Venezuela, the Misa de Gallo is only one of a series of Masses held at dawn called Misa de Aguinaldo. The name comes from the Spanish word for "Christmas box". The Masses are held for nine days and culminate on Christmas Eve. The songs of the liturgy are replaced by songs of the "gaita" genre , which is a folk genre from the Zulia state, and which are heard most widely throughout the country during Christmas. The lyrics of these gaitas are liturgical and approved to be played during ceremonies.

== See also ==
- Misa de Gallo, a version of the Midnight Mass in many Spanish-speaking countries
- Pasterka, a Midnight Mass celebrated in Poland
- Plygain, a Welsh service of worship taking place on Christmas morning
- Watchnight service, a service of worship observed on New Year's Eve
- Messe de minuit pour Noël H.9 by Marc-Antoine Charpentier
- Proclamation of the Birth of Christ
- Rorate Coeli
