= They'll Know We Are Christians =

1960s Christian hymn by Fr. Peter Scholtes

Song
- Released: 1960s
- Genre: Christian hymn
- Songwriter: Peter Scholtes

"They'll Know We Are Christians" (also known as "They'll Know We Are Christians By Our Love" or "We Are One in the Spirit") is a Christian hymn written in the 1960s by Catholic priest Fr. Peter Scholtes.

The title of the song may originate from John 13:35: "By this shall all men know that ye are my disciples, if ye have love one to another", Young's Literal Translation (YLT), or from a phrase that non-believers used to describe Christians believers of early Church: "Behold, how they love one another".

The song was released on an LP of the same name featuring the congregation of Fr. Scholtes' church, St. Brendan's on the south side of Chicago.

== Covers ==
The song has been covered by a variety of Christian recording artists, including Harvest Flight, Justin Unger, Jars of Clay, Rebecca St. James, Jason Upton, Lydia Walker, and For King & Country, which covered the song for the show "A.D.: The Bible Continues". The song was also featured in the opening of the Christian movie "A Distant Thunder" of the series "A Thief in the Night".

== See also ==
- Contemporary Catholic liturgical music
- List of English-language hymnals by denomination
- List of Roman Catholic hymns
