= Vox clara ecce intonat =

Latin Christian hymn

"Vox clara ecce intonat" is a Latin hymn used traditionally in the Liturgy of the Hours at Lauds during Advent. An alternative version of the same hymn begins "En clara vox redarguit".

== History ==
The original version of the hymn is often attributed to the 6th century, but the earliest documentary evidence is found in two 10th C sources. Whilst it has been attributed to a number of different authors, including St Ambrose, it is generally recorded in modern books as "anonymous." As a result of Pope Urban VIII's revision of the Breviary, the hymn was re-written in a more classical Latin style and published in 1632, with the opening line "En clara vox redarguit." Even so, the original version is in normal use in the current liturgy of the hours in the roman catholic church.

== Style ==
The hymn is written in iambic dimeter and it is a retelling of the preaching of John the Baptist, announcing the coming of Christ in the Gospel of Luke.

== Latin versions of the hymn ==
Vox clara ecce intonat
1 Vox clara ecce intonat,
obscura quaeque increpat:
procul fugentur somnia;
ab aethre Christus promicat.

2 Mens iam resurgat torpida
quae sorde exstat saucia;
sidus refulget iam novum,
ut tollat omne noxium.

3 E sursum Agnus mittitur
laxare gratis debitum;
omnes pro indulgentia
vocem demus cum lacrimis,

4 Secundo ut cum fulserit
mundumque horror cinxerit,
non pro reatu puniat,
sed nos pius tunc protegat.

5 Summo Parenti gloria
Natoque sit victoria,
et Flamini laus debita
per saeculorum saecula. Amen.

En clara vox redarguit
1 En clara vox redarguit
obscura quaeque personans:
procul fugentur somnia:
ab alto Jesus promicat.

2 Mens jam resurgat torpida,
non amplius jacens humi:
sidus refulget jam novum,
ut tollat omne noxium.

3 En Agnus ad nos mittitur
laxare gratis debitum:
omnes simul cum lacrimis
precemur indulgentiam:

4 Ut, cum secundo fulserit,
metuque mundum cinxerit,
non pro reatu puniat,
sed nos pius tunc protegat.

5 Virtus, honor, laus, gloria
Deo Patri cum Filio,
sancto simul paraclito,
In sæculorum saecula.

== English versions ==
It is estimated that there are at least 27 English translations of the hymn. The following examples were widely used in the nineteenth and twentieth century.

John Henry Newman
1 Hark, a joyful voice is thrilling,
And each dim and winding way
Of the ancient temple filling;
Dreams depart, for it is day.

2 Christ is coming – from thy bed,
Earth-bound soul, awake and spring –
With the sun new-risen to shed
Health on human suffering.

3 Lo, to grant a pardon free,
Comes a willing Lamb from heaven;
Sad and tearful, hasten we,
One and all, to be forgiven.

4 Once again he comes in light
Girding earth with fear and woe;
Lord, be thou our loving might,
From our guilt and ghostly foe.

5 To the Father and the Son
And the Spirit, who in heaven
Ever witness, Three and One,
Praise on earth be ever given.

John Mason Neale
1 A thrilling voice by Jordan rings,
rebuking guilt and darksome things:
vain dreams of sin and visions fly;
Christ in His might shines forth on high.

2 Now let each torpid soul arise,
that sunk in guilt and wounded lies;
see! the new Star's refulgent ray
shall chase disease and sin away.

3 The Lamb descends from heaven above
to pardon sin with freest love:
for such indulgent mercy shewn
with tearful joy our thanks we own.

4 That when again He shines revealed,
and trembling worlds to terror yield.
He give not sin its just reward,
but in His love protect and guard.

5 To the most high Parent glory be
and to the Son be victory,
and to the Spirit praise is owed
from age to age eternally. Amen

Edward Caswall
1 Hark! a thrilling voice is sounding:
'Christ is nigh,' it seems to say;
'Cast away the dreams of darkness,
O ye children of the day!'

2 Wakened to the solemn warning,
Let the earth-bound soul arise;
Christ, her Sun, all ill dispelling,
Shines upon the morning skies.

3 Lo! the Lamb, so long expected,
Comes with pardon down from heaven;
Let us haste, with tears of sorrow,
One and all to be forgiven;

4 That when next he comes with glory,
And the world is wrapped in fear,
With his mercy he may shield us,
And with words of love draw near.

5 Honour, glory, might, and blessing,
To the Father and the Son,
With the everlasting Spirit,
While eternal ages run.

The Caswell translation is often sung to the tune Merton (87.87) by William Henry Monk.

== See also ==
- List of Catholic hymns
- Canonical hours
