= Jean-Baptiste Pompallier =

First Bishop of Auckland

The Most Reverend Jean-Baptiste Pompallier
- Bishop of Auckland
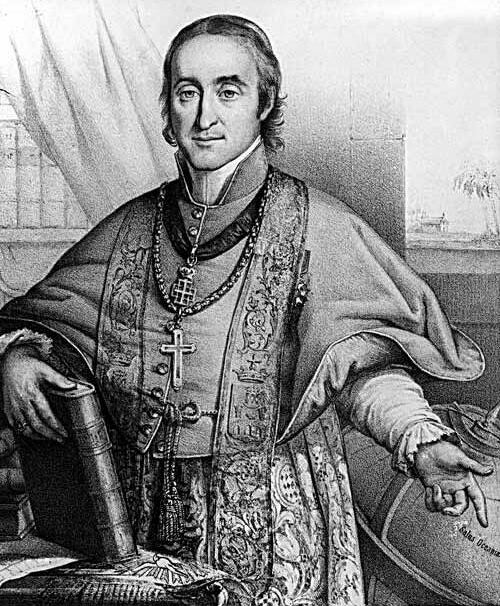
- Church: Catholic Church
- Diocese: Auckland
- See: Auckland
- Appointed: 3 July 1848
- Installed: 3 July 1848
- Term ended: 23 March 1869
- Predecessor: Himself as Vicar Apostolic of New Zealand
- Successor: Thomas Croke
- Other post: Titular Bishop of Maronea (1836)
- Previous posts: Vicar Apostolic of Western Oceania (1836); Vicar Apostolic of New Zealand (1842)

Orders
- Ordination: 13 June 1829 by Jean-Gaston de Pins
- Consecration: 30 June 1836

Personal details
- Born: Jean-Baptiste François Pompallier; 11 December 1801 Lyon, France
- Died: 21 December 1871 (aged 70) Puteaux, Paris, France
- Buried: St Mary's, Motuti, Hokianga Harbour, New Zealand

Jean-Baptiste François Pompallier (11 December 1801 – 21 December 1871) was the first Catholic bishop in New Zealand and, with priests and brothers of the Marist order, he organised the Catholic Church throughout the country. He was born in Lyon, France. He arrived in New Zealand in 1838 as Vicar Apostolic of Western Oceania, but made New Zealand the centre of his operations.

In 1848, he became the first Catholic Bishop of Auckland. He returned to France in 1868 and died in Puteaux, near Paris, on 21 December 1871, aged 70. His exhumed remains were returned to New Zealand in 2001, and they were re-interred under the altar at St Mary's, Motuti, in 2002.

== Early life ==
Jean Baptiste François Pompallier was born in Lyon, France, on 11 December 1801, the son of Pierre and Françoise Pompallier. Pierre Pompallier died less than a year later. His mother then married Jean-Marie Solichon, a Lyon silk manufacturer. François received the education of a gentleman. For a time, he served as an officer of dragoons. In 1825 he entered the Lyon seminary, was ordained in 1829, and served for seven years in the archdiocese of Lyon, becoming closely acquainted with the Society of Mary founded by Jean-Claude Colin.

== Appointment and voyage ==
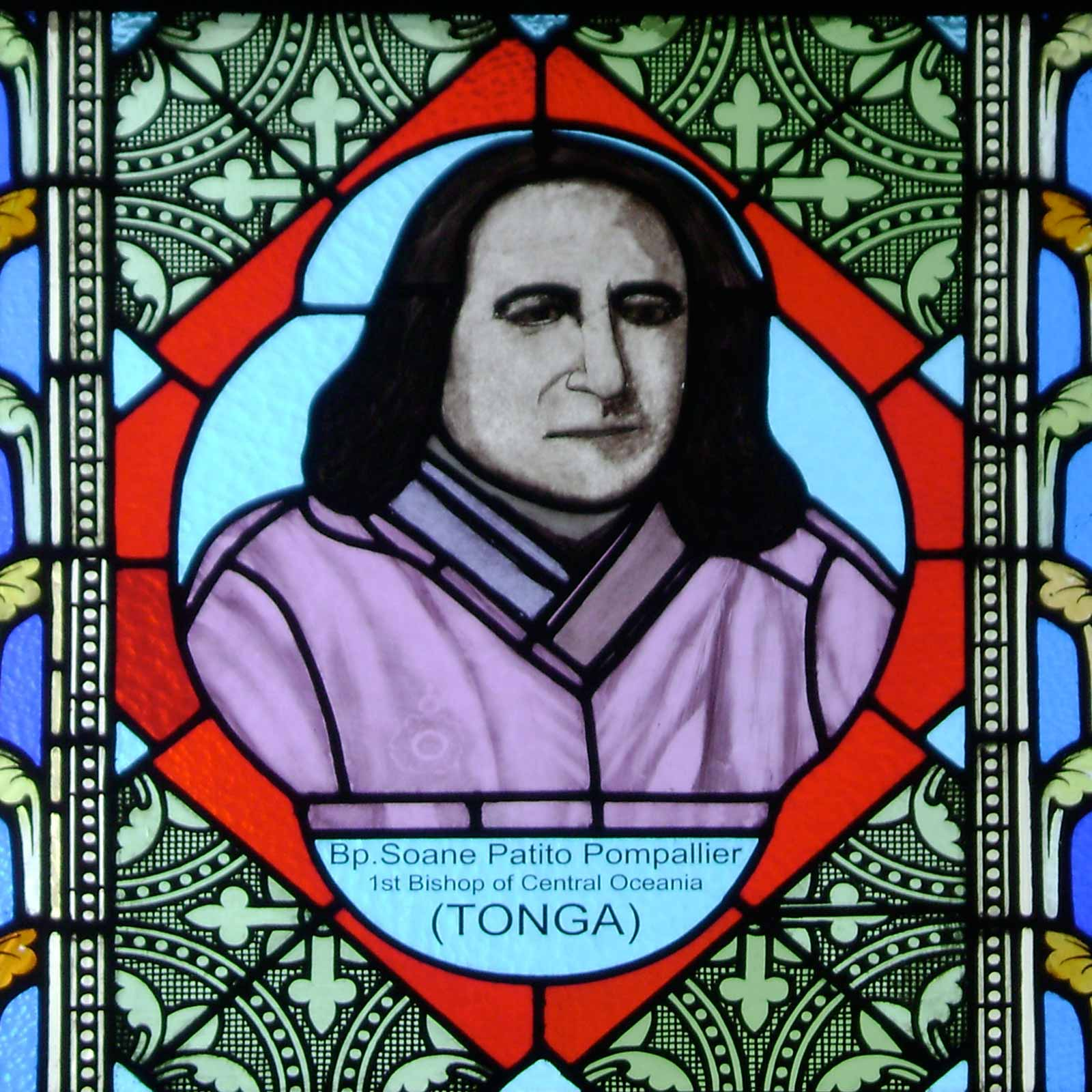
Jean-Baptiste Pompallier

On Trinity Sunday 1835, Pope Gregory XVI created the Vicariate Apostolic of Western Oceania, splitting it from the territory entrusted to the Congregation of the Sacred Hearts of Jesus and Mary {Picpus Fathers} as the area had proven too large. On 29 April 1836, he formally approved the "Priests of the Society of Mary" or Marist Fathers as a religious institute and assigned to it the mission of Western Oceania. Pompallier, who had been closely associated with the Marists, was named Vicar Apostolic, and consecrated Titular Bishop of Maronea on 30 June 1836.

On 24 December 1836, Pompallier sailed from Le Havre on the Delphine. He was accompanied by five Marist missioners. Two of Marcellin Champagnat's Petits Frères de Marie (Little Brothers of Mary), led by Peter Chanel. They arrived in early January at the Canary Islands, where Father Claude Bret caught a fever and died at sea some two months later. They arrived at Valparaíso on 28 June, where the "Picpus Fathers", who had care of the Apostolic Vicariate of Eastern Oceania, had their base.

On 10 August 1837, Pompallier and the remaining priests and brothers embarked on the Europa. The Europa stopped at Mangareva in the Gambier Islands on 13 September where Pompallier met Bishop Rouchouze, Vicar Apostolic for Eastern Oceania. On 21 September they reached Tahiti.

They left Tahiti on 23 October on the schooner Raiatea to drop off Father Pierre Bataillon and Brother Joseph-Xavier at Wallis, the main seat of the mission in Tonga. The missionaries arrived at Vava’u but rumours of an ambush scared the men into hiding. A woman by the Kalisi Tuipulotu hid the men in her house until it was safe enough to continued their journey to Futuna, arriving on 8 November 1837. There Chanel, a French lay brother Marie-Nizier Delorme, and an English Protestant layman named Thomas Boag, who had been resident on the island and had joined them at Tonga seeking passage to Futuna, left the group.

Pompallier travelled to Rotuma but was unable to leave anyone there. On arrival in Sydney in New South Wales he learned much about the New Zealand mission from Bishop John Polding.

== New Zealand ==
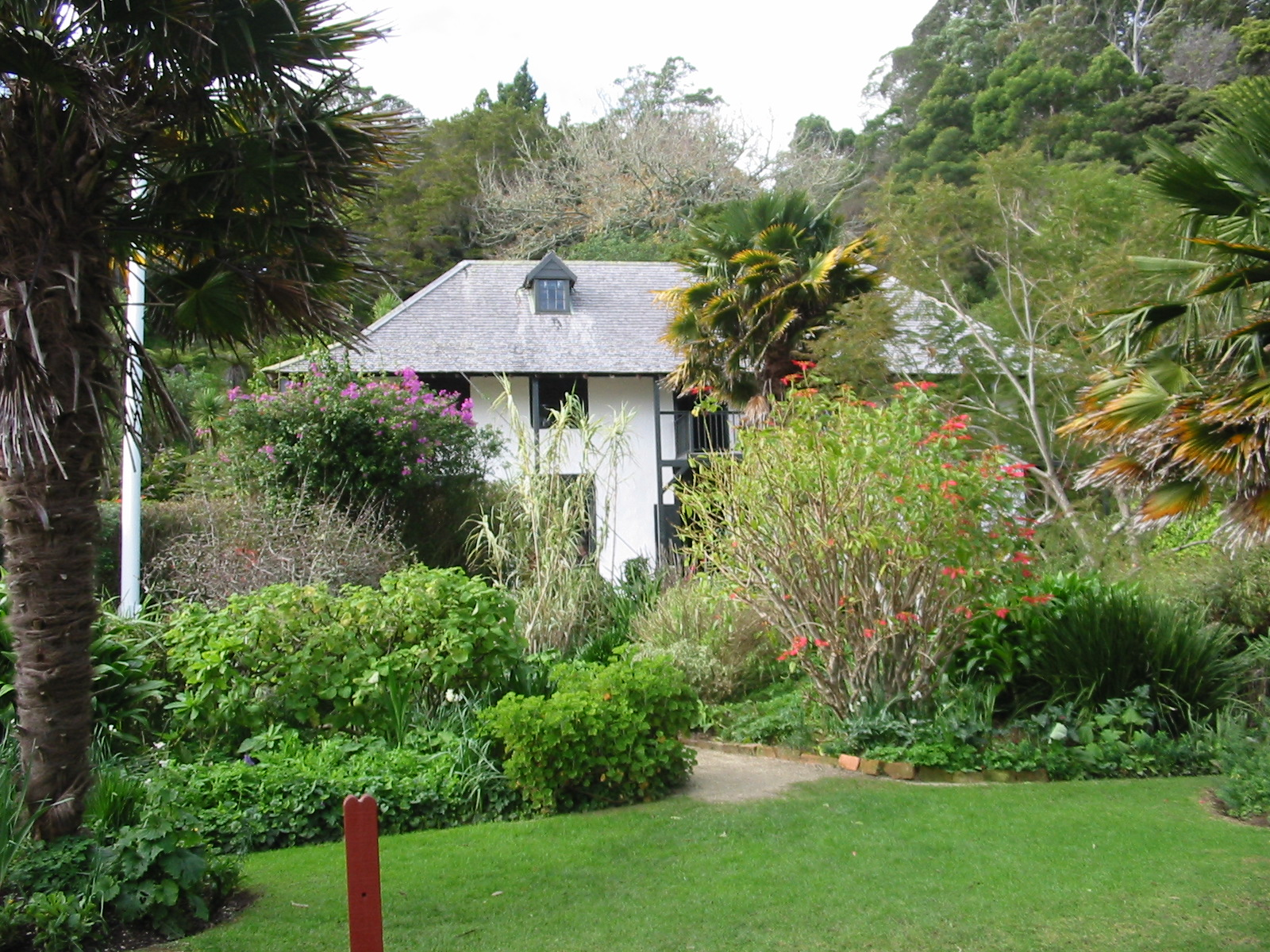
Pompallier House and gardens

On 30 December Pompallier, Fr Louis Catherin Servant SM and Brother Michel (Antoine) Colombon sailed for the Hokianga and arrived at the home of Thomas and Mary Poynton on 10 January 1838. It was to be his headquarters and the chief scene of his labour for the next 30 years.

Pompallier celebrated the first documented Mass in New Zealand at Totara Point on 13 January 1838, although it is possible an earlier Mass had been celebrated by the chaplain accompanying Jean-François de Surville on Christmas Day 1769. Pompallier immediately set about establishing Catholic mission stations. He quickly learned both English and Māori. Bishop Pompallier travelled extensively by schooner around both North and South Islands, setting up mission stations. By 1843, he had established stations in Hokianga, Kororāreka, Mangakahia, Kaipara, Tauranga, Akaroa, Matamata, Ōpōtiki, Maketu, Auckland, Otago, Wellington, Ōtaki, Rotorua, Rangiaowhia and Whakatāne.

The mission station in Kororareka encompassed the area surrounding what is now known as Pompallier House, Russell. A printing press was imported, and, with other Catholic missionaries, Pompallier sponsored the printing of prayer booklets in Māori, some of the earliest Māori publications. A tannery was set up to produce leather with which the pamphlets and books were bound.

Marist reinforcements arrived on the Reine de Paix on 18 June 1839 (Fathers Baty, Jean-Baptiste Épalle and Petit and Brothers Elie Regis, Augustin and Florentin). On 8 December, four more Marists arrived. They were Fathers Philippe Viard, Petit-Jean, Comte and Chevron and Brother Attale.

Pompallier was present at Waitangi on the day before and the morning of the signing of the Treaty of Waitangi, which was held across the bay from Kororareka, on 6 February 1840. Pompallier pushed for a guaranteed freedom of religion. Fifty years later, in his 1890 publication about the Treaty, William Colenso recorded that Pompellier arrived dressed in full "canonicals" (ceremonial robes) and did not appear at ease. Nevertheless, mainly due to Pompellier's insistence on the matter of religious tolerance, Henry Williams said to those present "E mea ana te Kawana, ko nga whakapono katoa, o Ingarani, o nga Weteriana, o Roma, me te ritenga Maori hoki, e tiakina ngatahitia e ia." ("The Governor says the several faiths [beliefs] of England, of the Wesleyans, of Rome, and also the Maori custom, shall be alike protected by him."). Pompallier was worried the treaty would hamper his mission and Colenso overheard that he had advised some Catholic Maori chiefs not to sign the treaty. Having secured the statement of religious freedom he did not stay, he left the gathering after the discussion and before the parties signed.

In November 1841, Pompallier learned that Peter Chanel had been killed at Futuna the previous April. He and Viard went to retrieve the body and brought it back to Kororāreka, before eventually being returned to the Society of Mary in Lyon.

A separate Apostolic Vicariate of New Zealand was erected in 1842. Pompallier then became the Vicar Apostolic of New Zealand. In 1846, with Viard already appointed as his assistant bishop, Pompallier set off to Rome for his Ad limina visit.

In 1842, Pompallier wrote the hymn Mō Maria, a hymn written and sung in Māori about Mary.

== Conflict and resolution ==
The missionaries serving with Pompallier were Marists. Difficulties arose between Marist superior Jean-Claude Colin, in Lyon, and Bishop Pompallier over jurisdiction and finances. These problems were aggravated by the difficulty of long-distance communication. Colin wished to receive reports from the Marist missioners on the state of the mission. Pompallier accused him of constant interference from Lyon.

The matter was settled in 1848, while Pompallier was still in Rome. The vicariate was divided into the Dioceses of Auckland (covering the northern half of the North Island) and Wellington (the rest of New Zealand). Pompallier was appointed Bishop of Auckland, which was to be staffed by secular clergy. Philippe Viard became the Apostolic Administrator of Wellington, served by the Marists. On 8 April 1850 Pompallier returned from Europe with 2 priests, 10 seminarians and 8 Irish Sisters of Mercy. He established St Mary's Seminary to train the seminarians. He became a British subject in 1851. While in Europe, Pompallier travelled extensively raising funds and personnel for his diocese. He returned on 30 December 1860, he returned with 8 Franciscans, 8 seminarians, and 4 French women who were intended to start a new order, the Sisters of the Holy Family. The group included Suzanne Aubert. During his absence, the Auckland area had grown considerably with the establishment of four Fencibles settlements.

Amid Pompallier's difficulties there was another consolation. On 9 March 1852, brothers James and Walter McDonald arrived in Auckland from Ireland. James had been ordained in Dublin; Pompallier ordained Walter in Auckland. The brothers gave Pompallier great service. They became his loyal lieutenants and good friends and especially assisted Pompallier as diocesan administrators and in attending to the Māori mission.

== Death ==
Through the 1850s, Pompallier was based in Auckland. A street (Pompallier Terrace) in the suburb of Ponsonby is named after him. Pompallier suffered from arthritis. In 1868, old and ill, he returned to France. He resigned on 23 March 1869 and was made honorary archbishop of Amasia. Pompallier died in Puteaux, near Paris, on 21 December 1871, ten days after his 70th birthday.

On 9 January 2001, his remains were exhumed. A contingent of New Zealanders organised a pilgrimage trip in the style of a hīkoi, to return his remains to New Zealand. The ossuary of Pompallier's remains were accompanied 24 hours a day, as they travelled from Otago to Hokianga, where they were re-interred under the altar at St Mary's, Motuti, on the Hokianga Harbour, in 2002.

== Memory ==
Educational institutions named in his honour include Pompallier Catholic College, Whangārei (1969). There are Pompallier houses at Sacred Heart College, Auckland (1903), Our Lady of the Rosary School, Waiwhetu (1932), Marcellin College, Auckland (1958), St. Bernard's College, Lower Hutt (1947), Carmel College, Auckland (1957), St John's College, Hamilton (1961), St Peter's College, Gore (1969), Liston College, Auckland (1974), St Mary's Rotorua, Garin College, Nelson (2002) and other New Zealand secondary and primary schools, such as Pompallier primary, Kiatia. Sancta Maria College, Auckland (2004) commemorates Pompallier and his work through the name of his schooner, the Sancta Maria.

== See also ==
- Catholic Church in New Zealand

Catholic Church titles
Preceded by New title	Vicar Apostolic of Western Oceania; 1836-1842	Succeeded by New title
Preceded by New title	Vicar Apostolic of New Zealand; 1842-1848	Succeeded by New title
Preceded by New title	1st Bishop of Auckland; 1848-1869	Succeeded by Thomas Croke
