= Leonard of Port Maurice =

Christian saint

Saint Leonard of Port Maurice O.F.M.
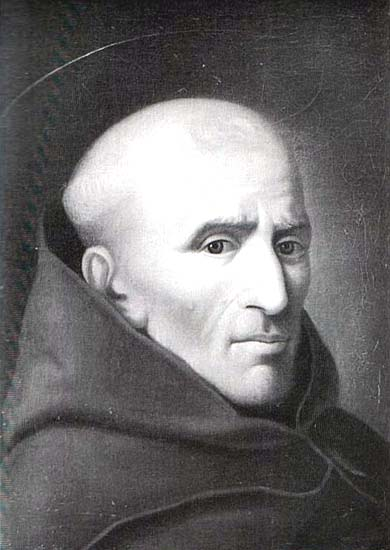

Priest
- Born: 20 December 1676; Porto Maurizio, Liguria, Republic of Genoa (in modern Italy)
- Died: 26 November 1751 (age 74); Rome, Papal States (in modern Italy)
- Venerated in: Roman Catholic Church
- Beatified: 19 June 1796, Saint Peter's Basilica, Papal States by Pope Pius VI
- Canonized: 29 June 1867, Saint Peter's Basilica, Papal States by Pope Pius IX
- Feast: 27 November; 26 November (Franciscans)
- Attributes: Franciscan habit
- Patronage: Missionaries, Preachers, Imperia

Leonard of Port Maurice, O.F.M., (Italian: San Leonardo da Porto Maurizio; 20 December 1676 – 26 November 1751) was an Italian Franciscan preacher and ascetic writer.

== Life ==
Leonard was born 19 December 1676, the son of Domenico Casanova and Anna Maria Benza. He was given the name Paul Jerome Casanova. Leonard's father was a ship captain whose family lived in Port Maurice on the northwestern coast of Italy. At 13, Leonard went to Rome to live with his uncle Agostino and study at the Jesuit Roman College. He was a good student and destined for a career in medicine. In 1697, however, he joined the Friars Minor. When he decided against medicine, his uncle disowned him. On 2 October 1697, he received the habit and took the name Brother Leonard, after a relative who had been kind to him. After making his novitiate at Ponticelli in the Sabine mountains, he completed his studies at St. Bonaventura on the Palatine at Rome.

After his ordination he remained there as lector (professor), and expected to be sent on the Chinese missions. After ordination Leonard contracted a bleeding ulcer and was sent to his hometown where there was a monastery of the Franciscan Observants (1704). After four years he was restored to health, and began to preach in Porto Maurizio.

== Mission work ==
When Cosimo III de' Medici handed over the monastery del Monte (on San Miniato near Florence, also called Monte alle Croci) to the members of the Riformella, Leonard was sent hither under the auspices and by desire of Cosimo III, and began shortly to hold missions among the people of Tuscany. His colleagues and he practiced austerities and penances during these missions. In 1710 he founded the monastery of Icontro, on a peak in the mountains about four miles from Florence, whither he and his assistants could retire from time to time after missions, and devote themselves to spiritual renewal.

Alphonsus Liguori called Leonard "the great missionary of the 18th century". He attracted large crowds and was invited to visit and preach in many places. Leonard spent over forty years preaching retreats, Lenten sermons and parish missions throughout Italy. His missions lasted 15 to 18 days, and he often stayed an additional week to hear confessions.

In 1720 he crossed the borders of Tuscany and held his celebrated missions in Central and Southern Italy. Everywhere Leonard made conversions, and was very often obliged both in cities and country districts to preach in the open, as the churches could not contain the thousands who came to listen. Pope Clement XII and Pope Benedict XIV called him to Rome; the latter especially held him in high esteem both as a preacher and as a propagandist, and exacted a promise that he would come to Rome to die. Pope Benedict XIV appointed him to several complex diplomatic assignments. In Genoa and Corsica, in Lucca and Spoleto the citizens expected a bejeweled cardinal to represent the intentions of the pope. Instead, they were confronted by a humble, shoeless, muddy friar to confound their hostility and pride.

For a time, Leonard was the spiritual director of Maria Clementina Sobieska of Poland, the wife of James Stuart, the Old Pretender.

Leonard founded many pious societies and confraternities, and exerted himself to spread devotion to the Sacred Heart of Jesus, and the perpetual adoration of the Blessed Sacrament. He also began to insist that the concept of the Immaculate Conception of Mary be defined as a dogma of the faith.

The Franciscans had been the custodians of the Holy Sites in the Holy Land, including of the "Way of the Cross", since 1343. Though many saints were devoted to the Stations of the Cross, few if any did more to promote them than Leonard. As a Franciscan priest, he preached the Way of the Cross at missions for forty-three years and reportedly set up stations in over 500 locations throughout Italy, including the Colosseum in Rome.

From May to November, 1744, he preached in Corsica, which at that time belonged to the Republic of Genoa and which was torn by party strife. In November, 1751, when he was preaching to the Bolognese, Benedict XIV called him to Rome, as already there were indications of his rapidly approaching end. The strain of his missionary labors and his mortifications had completely exhausted his body. He arrived on the evening of 26 November 1751, at his beloved monastery of St. Bonaventura on the Palatine, and expired on the same night at eleven o'clock at the age of seventy-four.

== Veneration ==
Pope Pius VI pronounced his beatification on 19 June 1796, and Pope Pius IX his canonization on 29 June 1867. The Franciscan Order celebrates his feast on 26 November, but outside this Order it is often celebrated on 27 November.

The partly incorrupt body of Leonard is kept in the high altar of the church of St. Bonaventure monastery in Rome, where he died.

St. Leonard's Church in Boston, founded in 1873, is the first Roman Catholic Church in New England built by Italian immigrants. The church is located in the historic North End of Boston at the corner of Hanover and Prince Streets on Boston's Freedom Trail.

== Works ==
The numerous writings of the saint consist of sermons, letters, ascetic treatises, and books of devotion for the use of the faithful and of priests, especially missionaries. The Diary (Diario) of his missions is written by the friar Diego da Firenze. A treasure for asceticism and homiletics, many of his writings have been translated into the most diverse languages and often republished: for example his Via Sacra spianata ed illuminata (the Way of the Cross simplified and explained), Il Tesoro Nascosto (on the Holy Mass); his celebrated Proponimenti, or resolutions for the attainment of higher Christian perfection. A complete edition of his works appeared first at Rome in thirteen octavo volumes (1853–84), Collezione completa delle opere di B. Leonardo da Porto Maurizio. Then another in five octavo volumes, Opere complete di S. Leonardo di Porto Maurizio (Venice, 1868–9). In English, German, etc., only single works have been issued, but a French translation of the entire set has appeared: Œuvres complètes de S. Léonard de Port-Maurice (8 vols., Paris and Tournai, 1858), and Sermons de S. Léonard de Port-Maurice (3 vols., Paris).

== Gallery ==
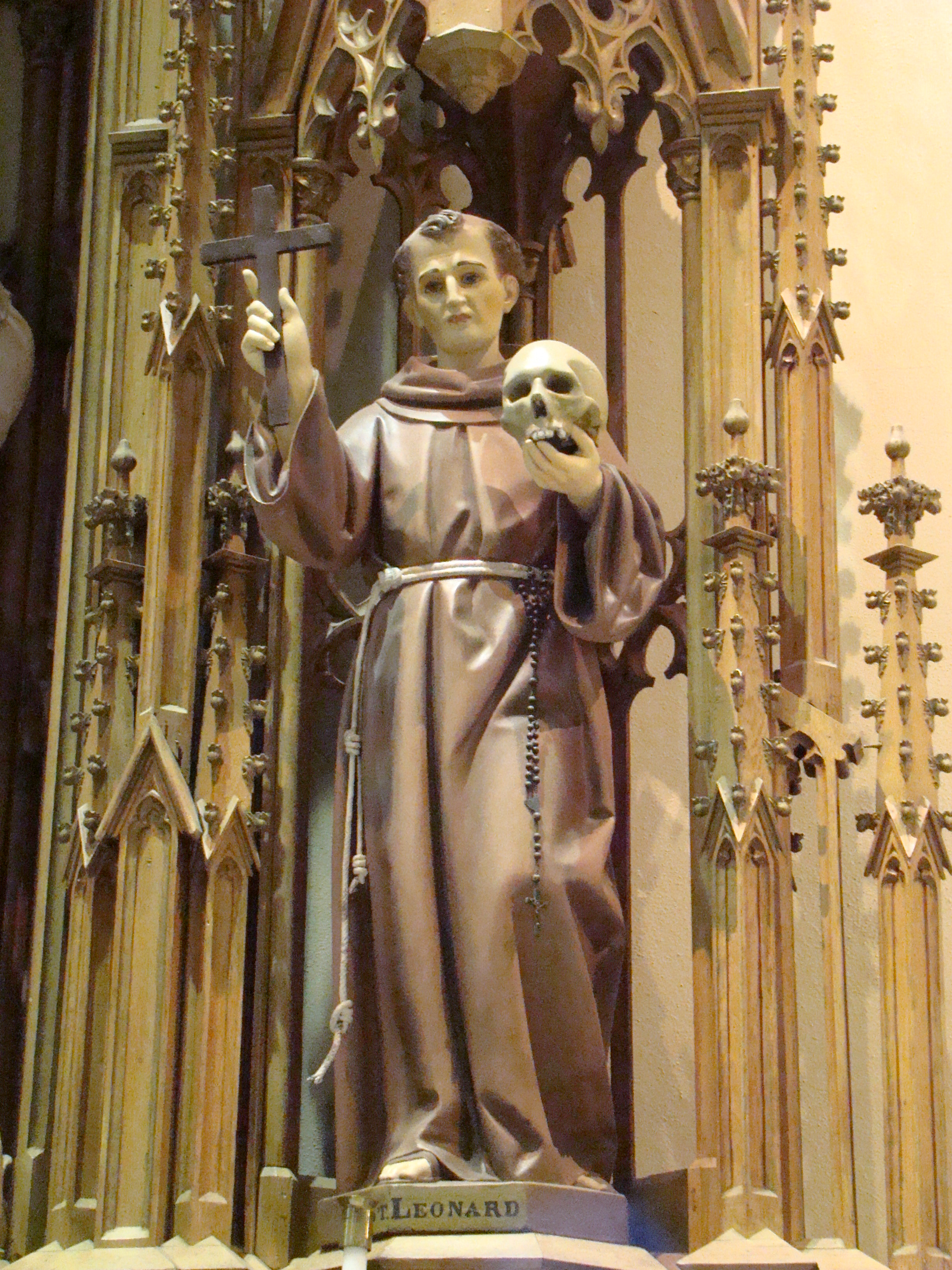
Statue of Saint Leonard of Port Maurice, in St. Francis Xavier Catholic Church, in Superior, Wisconsin, United States

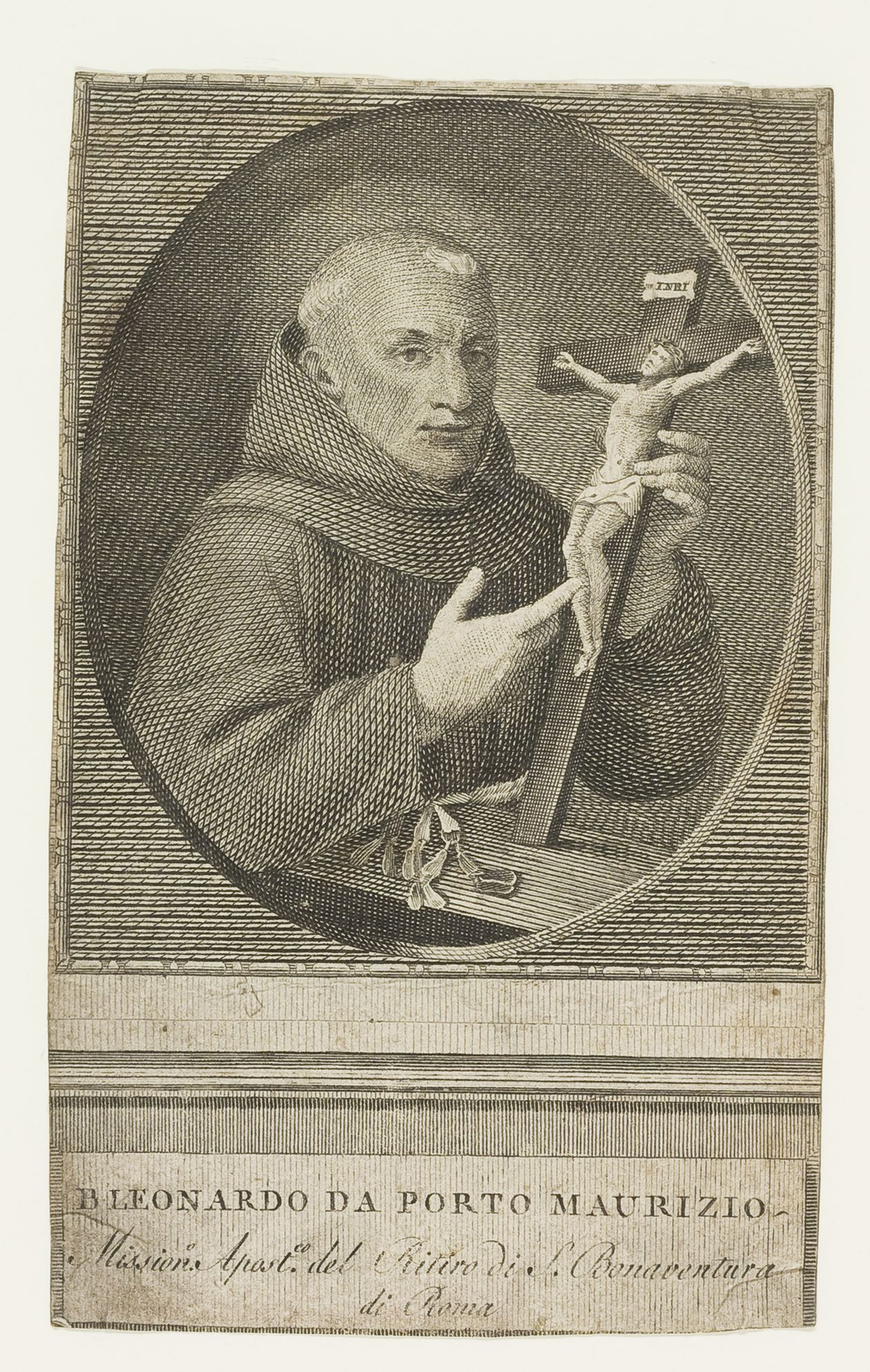
Leonardo da Porto Maurizio (engraving)

== See also ==
- Evviva Maria

== Sources ==
- Summarium processus beatificationis V.S.D. Leon. a P.M. (Rome, 1781)
- Rafaello da Roma, Vita del P. Leonardo da P.M. (Rome, 1754)
- Jos. de Masserano, Vita del B. Leonardo da P.M. (Rome, 1796), written by the postulator and dedicated to the duke of York, son of James [III] of England
- Salvatore di Ormea, Vita del B. Leonardo da P.M. (Rome, 1851)
- Heithausen and Gehlen, Leben des sel. Leonhard von P.M. (Innsbruck, 1869)
- L. de Cherancé, S. Léonard de Port-Maurice (Paris, 1903) in Nouvelle Bibliothèque Franciscaine (1st series), XIII. Chapter XX of this last mentioned work had already appeared in Etudes Franciscaines, VIII (Paris, 1902), 501–510.
