= James McDonald (priest) =

Irish-born New Zealand priest and missionary

- Born: 10 August 1824; Mooncoin, County Kilkenny, Ireland
- Died: 6 July 1890 (aged 65); Pūrākau, Hokianga, New Zealand
- Occupations: Priest; Missionary

James McDonald (10 August 1824 – 6 July 1890) was an Irish-born priest for the Catholic Church in colonial New Zealand. He was a key lieutenant to the Bishop of Auckland, Jean-Baptiste Pompallier, and was a missionary among the Māori people of the Northland region.

== Biography ==
James McDonald was born on 10 August 1824 in Nicholastown, Mooncoin, in Ireland's County Kilkenny. He studied at All Hallows College, in Dublin, and was ordained as a priest in 1851. He came to New Zealand in March 1852 and worked in the Roman Catholic Diocese of Auckland, under the Bishop of Auckland, Jean-Baptiste Pompallier. McDonald was appointed to the St Mary's Parish on what is now the North Shore where he first came into contact with Māori people. He soon became proficient in te reo, the Māori language.

The year after his arrival in New Zealand, McDonald became vicar general. He represented the arthritic Pompallier for the next several years, and was interim administrator of the Auckland Diocese in the absence of the bishop overseas for several months during the period from 1859 to 1860. By the late 1860s, McDonald increasingly engaged in missionary work among the Māori of the diocese. He again administered the diocese following Pompallier's departure from New Zealand in 1868 until Thomas Croke's appointment as the Bishop of Auckland. McDonald became parish priest at Drury, to the south of Auckland. However, he continued to visit Māori communities throughout the diocese, taking mass, performing baptisms and marriages.

In 1880 McDonald was made responsible for the pastoral care of all Māori in the Auckland Diocese. Three years later he was appointed vicar general to Māori. In this capacity he undertook to spread Catholicism among Māori. He was initially based at Maketu, in the Bay of Plenty but subsequently moved to Northland, which had been neglected by the diocese for several years. He was based at Pūrākau in the Hokianga but travelled extensively through the region. Instrumental in the building of several churches in the communities of Northland, he became known to the Māori as Matetanara.

In his final years McDonald became senile and he died in his hut at Pūrākau on 6 July 1890. He is buried in the cemetery at St Patrick's Church in Panmure, Auckland, alongside his brother Walter, formerly the parish priest there. Most of the churches built under McDonald's stewardship in Northland were relatively primitive structures and no longer exist.

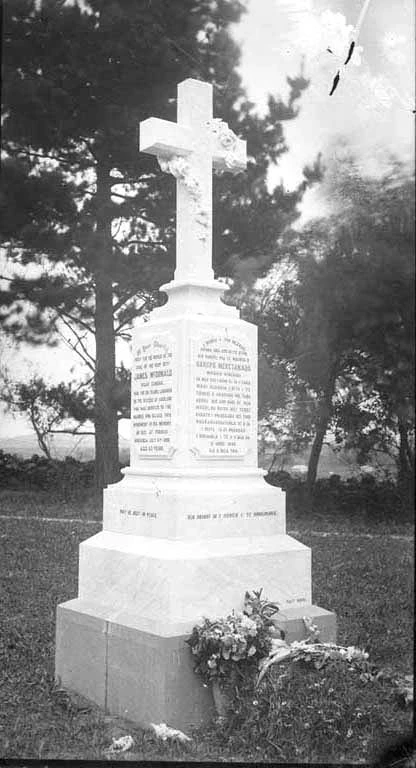
The grave of James McDonald at the cemetery of St Patrick's Church in Panmure
