= Francis de Geronimo =

Italian Roman Catholic saint

Saint Francesco de Geronimo S.J.

Priest
- Born: 17 December 1642; Grottaglie, Kingdom of Naples
- Died: 11 May 1716 (aged 73); Naples, Kingdom of Naples
- Venerated in: Roman Catholic Church
- Beatified: 2 May 1806, Saint Peter's Basilica, Papal States by Pope Pius VII
- Canonized: 26 May 1839, Saint Peter's Basilica, Papal States by Pope Gregory XVI
- Feast: 11 May
- Patronage: Naples (co-patron)

Francesco de Geronimo, also Francis Jerome (17 December 1642 – 11 May 1716) was an Italian Roman Catholic priest and a professed member of the Jesuits. He was an energetic pastor who dedicated himself to missions across Naples either in large locations or in rural areas where he was known for succinct and concise preaching that resonated with all people regardless of their social status. But from his love for the missions came a desire to be in the Far East for missions; he was pained when he was not allowed to join the Jesuit mission in Japan or India but continued to dedicate himself to preaching and teaching students. He is known to have written the "Diu vi Salvi Regina" which later was adopted as the national anthem of an independent Corsica in 1735.

== Life ==
Francesco de Geronimo was born in Grottaglie on 17 December 1642 as the eldest of eleven children to Giovanni Leonardo di Geronimo and Gentilesca Gravina. He led a pious childhood and at age twelve held the position of a sacristan and catechist at a house of the Theatines near his home.

The reception of his First Communion made him hunger ever more for the frequent reception of the Eucharist. In 1658, he entered the college at Taranto which was under the care of the Jesuits after his parents decided to send him there after noticing his talents. He underwent his humanities and philosophical studies there and was so successful to the point that his local bishop sent him to Naples to attend lectures in both theological studies and canon law at the college of Gesù Vecchio.

He received his ordination to the priesthood in Naples on 18 March 1666 from the Bishop of Pozzuoli Benito Sánchez de Herrera. He had to receive dimissorial letters from his archbishop (regarding studies) and a papal dispensation from Pope Alexander VII in order to be ordained under the age required. Until 1670, he was placed in charge of the pupils of the college of nobles in Naples where the students nicknamed him as "il santo prefetto". But he soon felt a strong inclination to join the Jesuits despite his father's opposition. His father sent him a long and vehement letter but his son answered it with great affection to induce his father to acquiesce to the will of God. He entered the Jesuit novitiate on 1 July 1670 and in 1671 after his probation was sent with an experienced missioner to get his first lessons in the art of preaching in the neighborhood of Otranto. From 1671 until 1674, he was labouring in towns and villages but was granted permission to complete his theological studies before being sent to reside at Gesù Nuovo in 1675. He would have preferred to serve in the missions of the Far East but his superiors told him to abandon the idea and to concentrate on his work there in Naples where he remained for the remainder of his life. He had wanted to go either to Japan or India but was refused this request.

He first devoted himself to stirring up the religious enthusiasm of a congregation of workmen called the "Oratio della Missione" which had established at the professed house of the Jesuits in Naples. The main object of this association was to provide the mission priests with helpers. It was at the Oratorio that he succeeded in establishing a mont de piété; the capital was increased with the gifts of the associates. He was an energetic preacher and went visiting all the environs of Naples; his voice was loud and sonorous and could be heard at a great distance due to its distinctness.

Whatever time was unoccupied with his missions he devoted to giving rural missions. He tried to establish an association of Francis Xavier (whom he made his patron and model); or else a congregation dedicated to the Blessed Virgin. For just over two decades he preached her praises once a week in the Neapolitan church known as Santa Maria di Constantinoppli. He was often seen walking through the streets of Naples with an ecstatic look on his face and tears streaming. He had a reputation for being a miracle-worker with those who testified during the process of canonization attributing to him numerous wonders and cures of all kinds.

In March 1715, at the start of Lent, he was giving a retreat to some students when he suddenly felt a racking fever so strong that he had to be carried out of the room to his bed. This ailment subdued over the course of the week and he resumed his usual duties despite his weakness which declined towards December. It was before Christmas that he felt so frail that his anxious superior sent him to Puzzuoli to recuperate. In March 1716, he was well enough to return to Naples where he stayed in the hospital wing. In mid-1716, he died from pleurisy after a fortnight of great pain. His remains were buried in a leaden coffin but when they were exhumed on 3 July 1736 it was discovered that they had turned to dust. The dust was collected and deposited into a coffin of wood lined with brass. Cardinal Orsini - the future Pope Benedict XIII - dedicated an entire sermon to him in the Benevento Cathedral.

There is a chapel dedicated to him at Gesù Nuovo in Naples, and in 1934 Francesco Jerace sculpted the statue that honors him.

== Sainthood ==
Not long after the Jesuit died, the Naples archdiocese petitioned the Congregation for Rites to begin the sainthood process; the Nola and Benevento dioceses made similar requests.

On 2 May 1758 he was proclaimed to be Venerable after Pope Benedict XIV declared in a formal decree that the late Jesuit priest had practiced the theological and cardinal virtues in a heroic fashion. He would have been beatified soon afterwards but the storm surrounding the suppression of the order led to the suspension of the beatification process. Pope Pius VII approved two miracles attributed to him and beatified him on 2 May 1806 in Saint Peter's Basilica, while the confirmation of two more miracles saw Pope Gregory XVI canonize Francesco de Geronimo as a saint of the Roman Catholic Church on 26 May 1839.

== Writings ==
Francesco de Geronimo wrote little. Some of his letters have been used in biographical works and cited by other authors. The archives of the Jesuits contain a voluminous collection of his sermons.

The account he wrote to his superiors of the fifteen most laborious years of his ministry dates from October 1693. He called it Brevi notizie della cose di gloria di Dio accadute negli exercizi delle sacri missioni di Napoli da quindici anni in quâ, quanto si potuto richiamare in memoria. Giuseppe Boero published it in S. Francesco di Girolamo, e le sue missioni dentro e fuori di Napoli, p. 67-181 (Florence, 1882).

== Sources ==
- For his writings, cf. Carlos Sommervogel, "Bibl. de la Compagnie de Jésus", new ed., III, column 1358
