= Roman Martyrology =

Official list of martyrs of the Catholic Church

The Roman Martyrology (Latin: Martyrologium Romanum) is the official martyrology of the Catholic Church. Its use is obligatory in matters regarding the Roman Rite liturgy, but dioceses, countries and religious institutes may add duly approved appendices to it. It provides an extensive but not exhaustive list of the saints recognized by the Church.

== History ==
In 1582, Pope Gregory XIII decreed a revision of the Julian calendar, creating a new system, now called, after him, the Gregorian calendar. The Roman Martyrology was first published in 1583. A second edition was published in the same year. The third edition, in 1584, was made obligatory wherever the Roman Rite was in use.

The main source was the Martyrology of Usuard, completed by the Dialogues of Pope Gregory I and the works of some of the Fathers, and for the Greek saints by the catalogue known as the Menologion of Sirlet. Its origins can be traced back to the Martyrologium Hieronymianum, which was originally based on calendars of Roman, African and Syrian provenance, but to which were gradually added names of many saints from other areas, resulting in a number of duplications, fusions of different saints into one, and other mistakes.

Very soon, in 1586 and again in 1589, revised editions were published with corrections by Caesar Baronius along with indications of the sources on which he drew, and in 1630 Pope Urban VIII issued a new edition. 1748 saw the appearance of a revised edition by Pope Benedict XIV, who personally worked on the corrections: he suppressed some names, such as those of Clement of Alexandria and Sulpicius Severus, but kept others that had been objected to, such as that of Pope Siricius. Subsequent changes until the edition of 2001 were minor, involving some corrections, but mainly the addition of the names of newly canonized saints.

== Recent developments ==
The Second Vatican Council decreed: "The accounts of martyrdom or the lives of the saints are to accord with the facts of history." The enterprise required years of study, after which a fully revised edition of the Roman Martyrology was issued in Latin (entitled Martyrologium Romanum) in 2001. This was followed in 2004 by a revision that corrected some typographical errors in the 2001 edition and added 117 people canonized or beatified between 2001 and 2004, as well as a considerable number of ancient saints not included in the previous edition. "The updated Martyrology contains 7,000 saints and blesseds currently venerated by the Church, and whose cult is officially recognized and proposed to the faithful as models worthy of imitation."

== Use of the Martyrology in the Roman Rite ==
As an official list of recognised saints and beati, inclusion in the Roman Martyrology authorises the recognition of saints in the following ways:

- On any weekday that admits celebration of the optional memorial of a saint, the Mass and the office may, if there is a good reason, be of any saint listed in the Martyrology for that day.
- A church building may be dedicated to a saint, or a saint chosen as patron of a place.

Such commemorations in honour of a person who has only been beatified are only permitted in the diocese or religious order where the cult of that person is authorised, unless special permission is obtained from the Holy See.

== Ceremonial surrounding the Martyrology ==
The entry for each date in the Martyrology is to be read on the previous day. Reading in choir is recommended, but the reading may also be done otherwise: in seminaries and similar institutes, it has been traditional to read it after the main meal of the day.

Prior to the Second Vatican Council, and where the 1962 liturgical books are used as authorised by Traditiones Custodes and its attendant Papal documents, the Martyrology is read at the canonical Hour of Prime. If the Martyrology is read in the post-Vatican II form, this is usually done after the concluding prayer of Lauds, the Hour that preceded Prime.

If the Martyrology is read outside of the Liturgy of the Hours, as for instance in the refectory, the reading begins with the mention of the date, followed, optionally, by mention of the phase of the moon. Then the actual text of the Martyrology entry is read, ending with the versicle taken from Psalm 116: Pretiosa in conspectu Domini – Mors Sanctorum eius ("Precious in the sight of the Lord – Is the death of his Saints"). A short Scripture reading may follow, which the reader concludes with Verbum Domini ("The word of the Lord"), to which those present respond: Deo gratias ("Thanks be to God"). A prayer, for which texts are given in the Martyrology, is recited, followed by a blessing and dismissal.

If the Martyrology is read within the Liturgy of the Hours, the same form is used, but without the optional scripture reading.

=== Special rubrics ===
Reading of the Martyrology is completely omitted during the Paschal Triduum: Holy Thursday, Good Friday, and Holy Saturday (in which no saints of Good Friday, Holy Saturday and Easter Sunday are commemorated).

On certain dates of the liturgical year, the Martyrology prescribes special announcements to be made before or after the commemoration of saints:

- On Christmas Eve, the long Proclamation of the Birth of Christ, also known as the Christmas Proclamation and the Kalenda, precedes the list of saints for December 25, as well as Mass.
- On Easter Sunday, the Martyrology not having been read during the Paschal Triduum, a proclamation of the Resurrection of Christ precedes the next day's (Easter Monday) saints.

== See also ==
- General Roman Calendar
- List of Old Covenant saints in the Roman Martyrology
- Martyrology
