= Walter McDonald (priest) =

Irish-born New Zealand priest and missionary

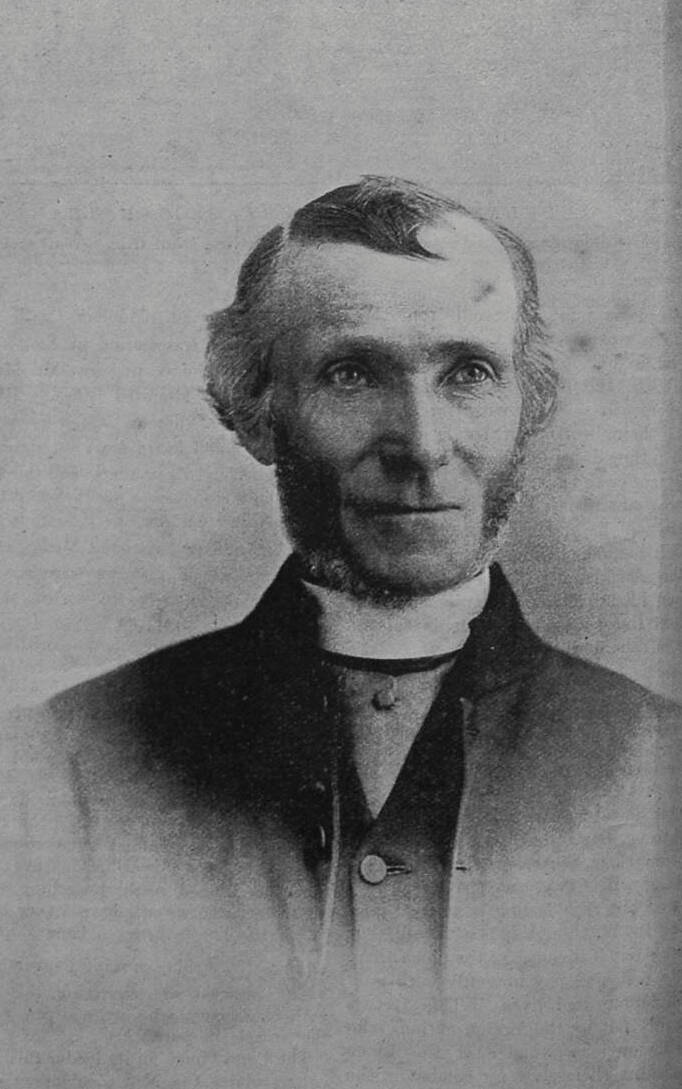
- Born: 14 December 1830; Mooncoin, County Kilkenny, Ireland
- Died: 31 December 1899 (aged 69); Auckland, New Zealand
- Occupation: Priest

Walter McDonald (14 December 1830 – 31 December 1899) was an Irish-born priest for the Catholic Church in colonial New Zealand. He was a key lieutenant to the Bishop of Auckland, Jean-Baptiste Pompallier and was later administrator of St Patrick's Cathedral.

== Biography ==
Walter McDonald was born on 14 December 1830 in Nicholastown, Mooncoin, in Ireland's County Kilkenny, the son of a farmer and his wife. He followed his brother, James McDonald, into the seminary and studied at All Hallows College, in Dublin. He came to New Zealand in 1855 as a deacon and worked in the Roman Catholic Diocese of Auckland, under the Bishop of Auckland, Jean-Baptiste Pompallier. The year after his arrival, McDonald was ordained a priest by Pompallier and became his secretary. He soon became proficient in te reo, the Māori language, and represented the bishop throughout the Bay of Islands and the east coast of Northland.

Following Pompallier's departure from New Zealand in 1868, McDonald continued in administration of the Auckland diocese. However, his skills in this respect were limited and he mismanaged its finances. In 1871, he was appointed administrator of St Patrick's Cathedral in Auckland but this involved considerable parish work, in which he excelled and he became very popular among the people of the city. In 1886, he became papal chamberlain, or monsignor, at St Patrick's Church in Panmure, at the behest of the then Bishop of Auckland, John Luck, who did not get on with McDonald.

McDonald remained well thought of by his parishioners at Panmure, and he even extended his responsibilities, becoming the chaplain to Ellerslie Racecourse. He was also a priest to the Auckland personnel of the New Zealand militia, the Volunteer Force. He died at his home in the late afternoon of 31 December 1899, having taken ill with influenza. Despite being unwell, he had conducted a sermon at nearby Howick and at his own church earlier in the day. After lying in state at St Patrick's Cathedral on 2 January, the next day his body was transported in one of the largest funeral corteges seen in Auckland up to that time to his parish in Panmure, St Patrick's Church, where he was buried in its graveyard. His brother James, who had predeceased him in 1890, is also interred there.

A tablet to his memory was unveiled at St Patrick's Cathedral in early November 1900. Our Lady of the Immaculate Conception Church in Ellerslie, built in 1904, is known locally as the Father Walter McDonald Memorial Church.
