= Mō Maria =

Catholic hymn written and sung in Māori

- English: For Mary
- Native name: Mō Maria
- Genre: Christian hymn
- Text: Jean-Baptiste Pompallier
- Composed: 1842

Audio sample
- Rendition by Te Kura Taumata o Panguru: file; help

"Mō Maria" (English: "For Mary") is a Christian hymn written by Jean-Baptiste Pompallier in 1842. After Pompallier had landed in New Zealand in January 1838, he sought to build a relationship with the Maori people of New Zealand. Bishop Pompallier wrote a hymn in Māori. "Mō Maria" continues to be sung throughout New Zealand in many Catholic churches.

== History ==
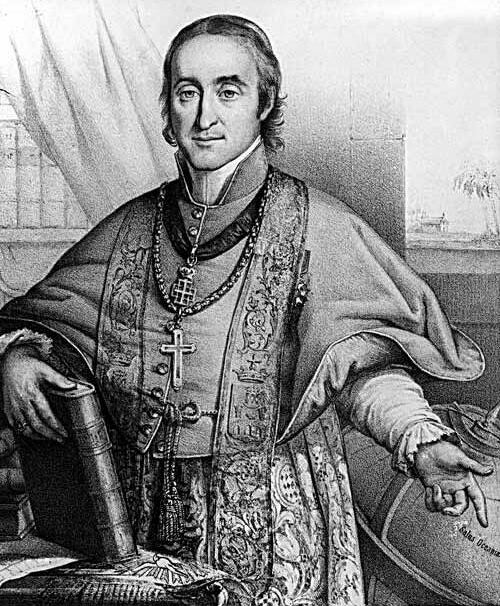
Bishop Pompallier

=== Text ===
The original text of the hymn was written by Bishop Pompallier after he landed in New Zealand. Wanting Māori to join the Catholic Church, he wrote a hymn in Māori honouring Mary so that it could be understood and sung among the Māori people and their tribes.

"Mō Maria" originally contained 14 verses. However, they are not always sung.

=== Tune ===
It is unknown whether the tune of "Mō Maria" was composed by Bishop Pompallier or if it was adapted from an existing Māori tune.

== Lyrics ==
These are four verses along with their English translation.

Mō Maria aianei
O tātou waiata
Kia kaha rā tātou
Kia nui te aroha.

Mō Maria aianei
O tātou waiata
Kia kaha rā tātou
Kia nui te aroha.

Aroha ki te Atua
Aroha ki a Maria
i te Rangi,
te whenua
āke tonu, āke tonu.

Mō Maria aianei
O tātou waiata
Kia kaha rā tātou
Kia nui te aroha.

Āmene

For Mary now
Our songs
Let us be strong
Let there be great love.

For Mary now
Our songs
Let us be strong
Let there be great love.

Love God
Love Mary
In heaven
And on earth
For ever and ever.

For Mary now
Our songs
Let us be strong
Let there be great love.

Amen
