= Rerum Creator Optime =

Hymn sung in Matins prior to 1962

Rerum Creator Optime was a hymn sung in Matins prior to 1962.
