= Dio vi salvi Regina =

Folk song and anthem of Corsica

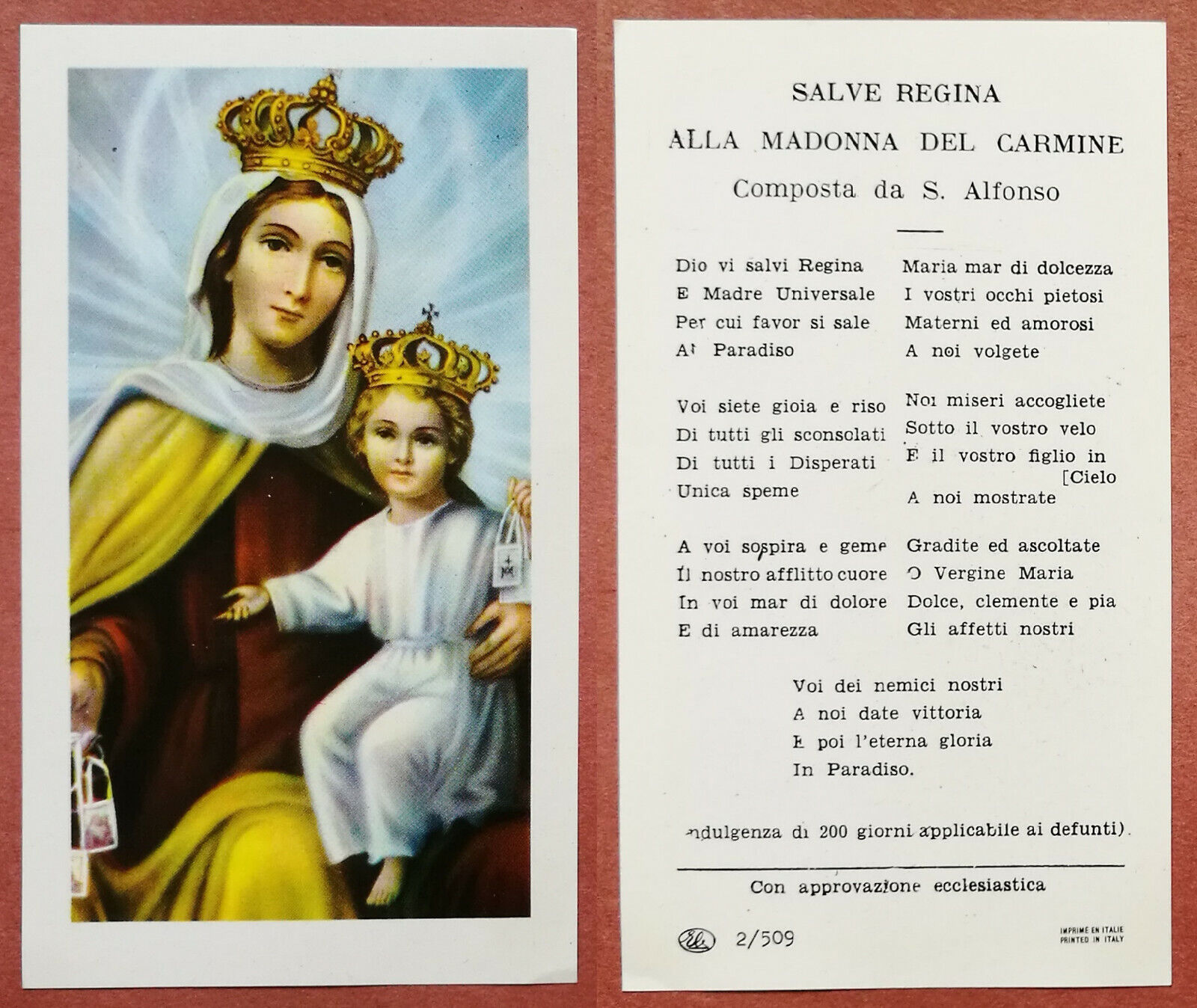
Dio vi salvi Regina (santino)

Dio vi salvi Regina (Italian for "God save you Queen") is a Corsican folk song. It is considered the de facto "national anthem" of Corsica. It is customarily sung at the end of concerts of Corsican folk music.

It was written as a religious song in Italy by Francis de Geronimo (later canonized) about 1675, transforming the Salve Regina into a folk-language hymn. It was adopted de facto as the national anthem of Corsica when it proclaimed independence from the Republic of Genoa at Orezza, on 30 January 1735. Traditionally, a shepherd, Salvadore Costa, is credited with converting the hymn not only to a Corsican anthem, but to a rallying symbol for Corsican independence. It was first performed at the Chapel of St. Mark (San Marco) on 25 April 1720.

The anthem requests the intercessory protection of the Virgin Mary, heartily concurred in by the independence leaders. There were a few changes, such as in the second stanza from "disperati" (desperate) to "tribolati" (troubled). The commonly used version's last stanza was an original addition, written in the Corsican language, which makes reference to victory against enemies of Corsica, as to highlight the adopted lyrics' intended use.

== Lyrics ==
=== Italian text ===
Original text

Dio vi salvi, Regina
Italian
Dio vi salvi, Regina
E Madre universale,
Per cui favor si sale
Al paradiso.
Per cui favor si sale
Al paradiso.

Voi siete gioia e riso
Di tutti i sconsolati,
Di tutti i tribolati
Unica speme.
Di tutti i tribolati
Unica speme.

A voi sospira e geme
Il nostro afflitto cuore
In un mar di dolore
E d'amarezza.
In un mar di dolore
E d'amarezza.

Maria, mar di dolcezza,
I vostri occhi pietosi,
Materni ed amorosi,
A noi volgete.
Materni ed amorosi,
A noi volgete.

Noi miseri accogliete
Nel vostro santo velo.
Il vostro figlio in cielo,
A noi mostrate.
Il vostro figlio in cielo,
A noi mostrate.

Gradite ed ascoltate,
O Vergine Maria,
Dolce, clemente e pia,
Gli affetti nostri.
Dolce, clemente e pia,
Gli affetti nostri.

Voi dai nemici nostri,
A noi date vittoria
E poi l'eterna gloria
In paradiso.
E poi l'eterna gloria
In paradiso.

Corsican translation

Dìu vi salvi, Regina
Corsican
Dìu vi salvi, Regina
È Matre universale,
Per qual favor si sallì
À u paradisu.
Per qual favor si sallì
À u paradisu.

Voi site gioia è risu
Di tutti i scunsulati,
Di tutti i tribulati
L'ùnica speme.
Di tutti i tribulati
L'ùnica speme.

À voi suspira è geme
Lu nostru afflittu core
In un mar di dulore
È d'amarezza.
In un mar di dulore
È d'amarezza.

Marìa, mar di dulcezza,
Li vostri ochji pietosi,
Materni ed amurosi,
À noi vulghjite.
Materni ed amurosi,
À noi vulghjite.

Noi mìseri accuglite
Ind'u vostru santu velu.
Lu vostru figliu in celu,
À noi mustrate.
Lu vostru figliu in celu,
À noi mustrate.

Gradite ed ascultate,
O Vèrghjina Marìa,
Dolce, clemente è pìa,
L'affetti nostri.
Dolce, clemente è pìa,
L'affetti nostri.

Voi dai nemici nostri,
À noi date vittoria
È poi l'eterna gloria
In paradisu.
È poi l'eterna gloria
In paradisu.

French translation

Que Dieu vous garde Reine
French
Que Dieu vous garde, Reine
Et Mère universelle
Par qui on s'élève
Jusqu'au paradis.
Par qui on s'élève
Jusqu'au paradis.

Vous êtes la joie et le rire
De tous les attristés,
De tous les tourmentés
L'unique espérance.
De tous les tourmentés
L'unique espérance.

Vers vous soupire et gémit
Notre cœur affligé
Dans une mer de douleur
Et d'amertume.
Dans une mer de douleur
Et d'amertume.

Marie, mer de douceur,
Vos yeux pieux,
Maternels et aimants,
Tournez-les vers nous.
Maternels et aimants,
Tournez-les vers nous.

Nous, malheureux, accueillez-nous
En votre saint voile.
Votre fils au ciel,
Montrez-le nous.
Votre fils au ciel,
Montrez-le nous.

Acceptez et écoutez,
Ô Vierge Marie,
Douce, clémente et pieuse,
Nos marques d'affection.
Douce, clémente et pieuse,
Nos marques d'affection.

Sur nos ennemis,
Donnez-nous la victoire
Et l'éternelle gloire
Au paradis.
Et l'éternelle gloire
Au paradis.

English translation

God save you Queen
English
God save you, Queen
And universal Mother
By whom we rise
To paradise.
By whom we rise
To paradise.

You are the joy and laughter
Of all the saddened,
Of all the tormented
The only hope.
Of all the tormented
The only hope.

Towards you sighs and moans
Our distressed heart
In a sea of pain
And bitterness.
In a sea of pain
And bitterness.

Mary, sea of gentleness,
Your pious eyes,
Maternal and loving,
Turn them towards us.
Maternal and loving,
Turn them towards us.

We, unfortunates, welcome us
In your holy veil.
Your son in heaven,
Show him to us.
Your son in heaven,
Show him to us.

Accept and listen,
O Virgin Mary,
Sweet, clement and pious,
Our marks of affection.
Sweet, clement and pious,
Our marks of affection.

Over our enemies,
Give us the victory
And the eternal glory
In paradise.
And the eternal glory
In paradise.

=== Corsican text ===
Text

Diu vi salvi Regina
È madre universale
Per cui favor si sale
Al paradisu.

Voi siete gioa è risu
Di tutti i scunsulati
Di tutti i tribulati
Unica speme.

À voi sospira è geme
Il nostru afflitu core
In un mar' di dolore
È d'amarezza.

Maria, mar' di dolcezza
I vostri ochji pietosi
Materni ed amorosi
À noi volgete.

Noi miseri accogliete
Nel vostru santu velu
Il vostru figliu in celu
À noi mostrate.

Gradite ed ascultate
Ô vergine Maria
Dolce è clemente è pia
Gli affleti nostri.

Voi da i nemici nostri
À noi date vitoria
E poi l'eterna gloria
In paradisu.

IPA (Northern Corsican)

diu vi 'zalvi re'ʤina
e madre wniver'salɛ
pek'kuj fa'vɔr si 'zalɛ
al para'ðizu

boj 'sjete 'ʤoa e rizu
di tutti j skũnsu'ladi
di dutti i tribu'ladi
'uniga 'speme

a bboj zospira e ʤeme
u 'nostrw af'flittu gore
in ũn mar di do'lɔrɛ
e ðama'rɛttsa

Ma'ria mar di ðɔl'ʧɛttsa
I 'bɔstrj ɔcci pjɛ'tɔzi
ma'dernj eðamɔrɔzi
a noj bol'ʤɛdɛ

gra'dide ed askul'tade
o 'verʤine mar'ia
'dolʧe e kle'mɛnte 'pia
ljaf'fleti 'nɔstri

== See also ==
- Evviva Maria
