= Brigitte Scholtes =

German radio journalist

Brigitte Scholtes – born 1958 in Eschweiler, Germany – is a German radio journalist, business editor and national correspondent for German Broadcast Station "Deutschlandfunk" (DLF) from Frankfurt, Hesse, Germany.

== Life ==
She studied economic history and English language and literature in Bonn and spent a year in England. In 1977 she came to internship at Frankfurter Allgemeine Zeitung (FAZ) newspaper and switched to their newsroom and radio editorial department "Tele-FAZ". In 1992 she worked for Bloomberg Business News. Since 1993 she has been working in the business editorial department "Business Report", which since 1996 delivers daily business news from Frankfurt for DLF and various newspapers. In the editorial office also Michael brown was active. Scholtes was president of the Frankfurt International Businessjournalists Club (Internationalen Club Frankfurter Wirtschaftsjournalisten) (ICFW).

Scholtes is the author and contributor of 75 episodes of the daily program "background" on DLF and other daily broadcasts.

== Awards ==
- 2009: Journalist Award of the State Street Corporation for the broadcast "background" titled "Explosive force for the monetary union" from 13 November 2008
