= I Am the Bread of Life =

Hymn

"I Am the Bread of Life" is a Christian hymn composed by Sr. Suzanne Toolan in 1966, based on the Bread of Life Discourse in John 6, and John 11.

== History ==
Suzanne Toolan was born in Lansing, Michigan, on October 24, 1927. She joined the Sisters of Mercy in Burlingame, California, in 1950, where she taught chorale at Mercy High School. Toolan wrote the words to the hymn in 1964 during her time in between classes. Toolan claims to have discarded the original copy before being inspired by a student to keep it. She originally presented the hymn in its final form at a diocesan music educators' conference in 1966. The popularity of the hymn coincided with the use of vernacular languages following the Second Vatican Council.

Along with its use in the Worship hymnal for the Catholic Church, the hymn also appears in the Episcopal Church's The Hymnal 1982 and the Evangelical Lutheran Church in America's Evangelical Lutheran Worship.
