= Meredith J. C. Warren =

Senior Lecturer in Biblical and Religious Studies

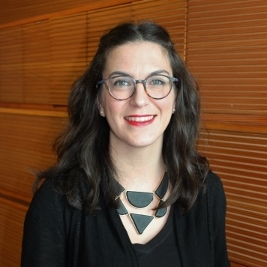
- Occupations: Senior lecturer in Biblical and Religious Studies at the University of Sheffield

Academic background
- Education: B.A. (2004), M.A. (2006), Ph.D. (2013)
- Alma mater: McGill University

Academic work
- Main interests: The Gospel of John, the Book of Revelation, meals in the Greco-Roman World, early Judaism, ancient romance novels, pseudepigrapha, senses in Antiquity
- Website: meredithwarren.hcommons.org

Meredith J. C. Warren (born in Vancouver, British Columbia) is a senior lecturer in Biblical and Religious Studies at the University of Sheffield. She is known for her views on the New Testament and early Judaism, as well as for her media appearances for such outlets as The Washington Post, and BBC radio. She is a Metis citizen of the Manitoba Metis Federation.

== Education and career ==
Warren obtained her Bachelor of Arts (2004) and Master of Arts (2006) from McGill University. She earned a PhD in 2013 from McGill in religious studies, specializing in New Testament, early Judaism, and ancient Mediterranean religions. She was awarded a postdoctoral fellowship from the Fonds de recherche du Québec, before taking her position at Sheffield University, where she directs the Sheffield Centre for Interdisciplinary Biblical Studies and is editor in chief of its flagship journal, the Journal of Interdisciplinary Biblical Studies. She serves as an associate editor for the Enoch Seminar Online Reviews.

Warren's scholarly publications include several books and articles on Jesus, food, gender, anti-Judaism, feminism, the senses, and clothing in early Christianity and early Judaism.

She has contributed to The Washington Post and The Independent on the subject of the Historical Jesus. She has been interviewed by BBC Radio and the Star on the New Testament and Jesus. She also gave interviews to NPR and The Guardian about the changes to the Lord's Prayer in 2019.

Warren served as an adjunct professor of Religious Studies at McGill University from 2007 to 2015. In 2015 she was appointed as a lecturer in Biblical and Religious Studies at the University of Sheffield's Institute for Interdisciplinary Biblical Studies. Warren was honored with a Senate Award for Excellence in Learning and Teaching by the University of Sheffield in 2019. In 2020 she was elected to the Studiorum Novi Testamenti Societas (Society of New Testament Studies). Her co-authored textbook, Jewish and Christian Women in the Ancient Mediterranean, won the Frank W. Beare Award from the Canadian Society of Biblical Studies in 2023.

== Works ==
=== Books ===
- Warren, Meredith, Sara Parks, and Shayna Sheinfeld (2022). Jewish and Christian Women in the Ancient Mediterranean. London: Routledge. ISBN 9781138543782
- Warren, Meredith (2015). My Flesh is Meat Indeed: A Non-Sacramental Reading of John 6: 51–58. Minneapolis, MN: Fortress Press. ISBN 978-1451496697.
- ——— (2019). Food and Transformation in Ancient Mediterranean Literature. Writings from the Greco-Roman World Supplement Series. Vol. 14. Atlanta, GA: Society of Biblical Literature Press. ISBN 9781628372380. OCLC 1059260209.

=== Journal articles ===
- ———. (2020) ""Confronting Judeophobia in the Classroom," with Sarah E. Rollens and Eric Vanden Eykel. Journal for Interdisciplinary Biblical Studies 2.1: 81–106.
- ———. (2018) "The Cup of God’s Wrath: Libation in Revelation and Early Christian Meal Practice" Religions 9.413. Special Issue: Sacrifice and Religion; Daniel Ullucci, ed.
- ———. (2017) "Tasting the Little Scroll: A Sensory Analysis of Divine Interaction in Revelation 10:8–10." Journal for the Study of the New Testament 40.1: 101–119.
- ——— (2016). "Teaching with Technology: Using Digital Humanities to Engage Student Learning" (PDF). Journal for Teaching Theology and Religion. 19 (3): 309–319. doi:10.1111/teth.12343.
- ——— (2015). "My Heart Poured Forth Understanding: 4 Ezra's Fiery Cup as Hierophagic Consumption" (PDF). Studies in Religion/Sciences Religieuses. 44 (3): 320–333. doi:10.1177/0008429814566212. S2CID 170333321.
- ——— (2006). "My OTP: Harry Potter Fanfiction and the Old Testament Pseudepigrapha". Scriptura. 8 (1): 53–66.

=== Book chapters ===
- ———. (2020) "Domestic Spaces in Late Ancient Judaism" in A Companion to Late Ancient Judaism. Naomi Koltun-Fromm and Gwynn Kessler, eds.; Wiley-Blackwell Press.
- ———. (2018) "‘When the Christ appears, will he do more signs than this man has done?’ (John 7:31): Signs and the Messiah in the Gospel of John" in Reading the Gospel of John’s Christology as a Form of Jewish Messianism: Royal, Prophetic, and Divine Messiahs. Benjamin Reynolds and Gabriele Boccaccini, eds.; Leiden: Brill. Pp 229–247.
- ———. (2017) "Human and Divine Justice in the Testament of Abraham" in The Embroidered Bible: Studies in Biblical Apocrypha and Pseudepigrapha in Honour of Michael E. Stone. Edited by Lorenzo DiTommaso, Matthias Henze, and William Adler. Studia in Veteris Testamenti Pseudepigrapha; Leiden: E.J. Brill.
- ———. (2017) "Tastes from Beyond: Persephone’s Pomegranate and Otherworldly Consumption in Antiquity" in Taste and the Ancient Senses. The Senses in Antiquity; Kelli C. Rudolph, ed; Routledge Press.
- ——— (2014). "A Robe Like Lightning: Clothing Changes and Identification in Joseph and Aseneth". In Upson-Saia, Kristi; Daniel-Hughes, Carly; Batten, Alicia (eds.). Dressing Judeans and Christians in Antiquity. Farnham, Surrey & Burlington, VT: Ashgate. pp. 137–153.

=== Dictionary, lexicon, and encyclopedia entries ===
- ——— (2009). "LATREUO". In Harley, Richard (ed.). Contexticon of New Testament Language. Oxford: Oxford University Press.
- ——— (2011). "HAGNOS". In Harley, Richard (ed.). Contexticon of New Testament Language. Oxford: Oxford University Press.
- ———; Henderson, Ian H. (2012). "Mark". In Gilmour, Michael J.; Beavis, Mary Ann (eds.). The Dictionary of the Bible and Western Culture. Sheffield: Sheffield Academic Press. ISBN 9781907534799. OCLC 823234559.
- ——— (2013). "Joseph and Aseneth". 4 Enoch: The Online Encyclopedia of Second Temple Judaism (Jewish, Christian, and Islamic Origins).
- ——— (2013). "Jewish Novels". 4 Enoch: The Online Encyclopedia of Second Temple Judaism (Jewish, Christian, and Islamic Origins).
