= Laudate omnes gentes =

Laudate omnes gentes - is the first line of Psalm 117 in Latin. It is also used as a stanza sung during Mass. The words in Latin and English translation are as follows:

Latin

Omnes gentes, pláudite mánibus: * jubiláte Deo in voce exsultatiónis.
Quóniam Dóminus excélsus, terríbilis: * Rex magnus super omnem terram.
Subjécit pópulos nobis: * et gentes sub pédibus nostris.
Elégit nobis hereditátem suam: * spéciem Jacob, quam diléxit.
Ascéndit Deus in júbilo: * et Dóminus in voce tubæ.
Psállite Deo nostro, psállite: * psállite Regi nostro, psállite.
Quóniam Rex omnis terræ Deus: * psállite sapiénter.
Regnábit Deus super gentes: * Deus sedet super sedem sanctam suam.
Príncipes populórum congregáti sunt cum Deo Ábraham: * quóniam dii fortes terræ veheménter eleváti sunt.

English

O clap your hands, all ye nations: * shout unto God with the voice of joy,
For the Lord is high, terrible: * a great king over all the earth.
He hath subdued the people under us; * and the nations under our feet.
He hath chosen for us his inheritance, * the beauty of Jacob which he hath loved.
God is ascended with jubilee, * and the Lord with the sound of trumpet.
Sing praises to our God, sing ye: * sing praises to our king, sing ye.
For God is the king of all the earth: * sing ye wisely.
God shall reign over the nations: * God sitteth on his holy throne.
The princes of the people are gathered together, with the God of Abraham: * for the strong gods of the earth are exceedingly exalted.
