= Sacra jam splendent =

Sacra jam splendent is a Roman Catholic hymn for Matins on the Feast of the Holy Family.

== Background and text ==
The Holy See, under Pope Benedict XV, made the feast, previously celebrated at a local or regional level, part of the General Roman Calendar in 1921, with the rank of duplex majus (Greater Double) and assigning it to the Sunday within the octave of Epiphany. the reforms of the Second Vatican Council, it is celebrated on the Sunday within the Octave of Christmas.

Pope Leo XIII composed the three hymns (Vespers, Matins, Lauds) of the Breviary. The hymn for Matins contains nine Sapphic stanzas of the classical type of the first stanza:

Text	Translation
Sacra jam splendent decorata lychnis Templa, jam sertis redimitur ara, Et pio fumant redolentque aerrae Thuris honore.	A thousand lights their glory shed On shrines and altars garlanded, While swinging censers dusk the air With perfumed prayer.

The hymns for Vespers (O Lux Beata Caelitum) and Lauds (O Gente Felix Hospita) are in classical dimeter iambics, four-lined stanzas, of which the Vespers hymn contains six and the Lauds hymn seven exclusive of the usual Marian doxology (“Jesu tibi sit gloria...”).

The 1913 Catholic Encyclopedia praises the hymns as "replete with spiritual unction, graceful expression, and classical dignity of form", and draws a connection to the sentiments of Leo XIII in his letter establishing a pious association in honour of the Holy Family and in his encyclical Rerum novarum, which discusses the condition of workers.
