= Evviva Maria =

Cry of Marian devotion

Evviva Maria is a usual thanksgiving cry used by Roman Catholics as an expression of popular devotion in honor of the Blessed Virgin Mary. It is a devotion promoted by a hymn composed by an Order of Friars Minor Observant Franciscan, Leonard of Port-Maurice at the beginning of the 18th century and associated with the devotion the Holy Name of Jesus and the Holy Name of Mary encouraged by various Popes since the time of Pius VI.

== History ==
=== Origin ===
Leonard of Port Maurice, who died in 1751, appears to be the first to have composed a full-length hymn entitled Evviva Maria as praises in honour of the Virgin Mary with 39 verses. It was published in 1854 from his archives at the Convent of Saint Bonaventure on the Palatine Hill in Rome during the process of his canonization which concluded in 1867, by which time it had already become widely popular.

In 1750, using Evviva Maria as a refrain and inspired by Porto Maurizio, Alphonsus de' Liguori wrote a poem with only ten verses on the Death of Mary, commemorated yearly by Roman Catholics on the solemnity of the Assumption of the Virgin Mary on 15 August. It was published in The Glories of Mary which became a classic book in the field of Roman Catholic mariology. While the refrain is the same, the verses are completely different; while Saint Leonard focused on the life of Jesus as seen through the eyes of Mary, Liguori focused entirely on the Assumption of the Virgin Mary.

=== Miraculous icons (1781–1797) ===
Since 1781, it is reported that Evviva Maria was sung before the icon of Our Lady of Graces which provided miraculous protection to the city of Faenza.

In Rome, in 1797, Giovanni Marchetti recalls the hymn Evviva Maria, evviva Gesu: Evviva Maria, e chi la creo, during processions, in a surge of Marian devotion linked to miracles attributed to the Virgin Mary. This refrain was sung in chorus and in harmony while the verse was composed with a certain diversity

=== Viva Maria movement (1797–1800) ===
The Viva Maria became the name given to one of the anti-French movements, known collectively as the Sanfedisti, which arose in Italy between 1799 and 1800. It operated above all in the town of Arezzo and the rest of Tuscany, but also in the neighboring territories of the Papal States. Evviva Maria became their battle hymn as can be seen under the image of the Madonna del Conforto in Roccalbegna. Under an eagle there is a ribbon cartouche on which one reads the inscription "Roccalbegna, di, evviva Maria e chi la creò" and the date 1799 is still legible. It became a rallying cry for all the anti-Jacobin Italians resisting the French invasion:

« Evviva Maria, Evviva Gesù, Evviva il Papa, Evviva il Re di Napoli »

— Anti-Jacobine Italian Resistance

=== Roman cholera pandemic (1826–1837) ===
During the 1826–1837 cholera pandemic, Pope Gregory XVI ordained a procession in 1835 of the Salus Populi Romani icon which went through the streets and accordingly obtained miraculous protection. As the icon of Mary attributed to Saint Luke entered the basilica of Santa Maria Maggiore, "the Evviva Maria at that moment reached even to the heavens".

In the same year 1835, Evviva Maria was included in new stamped Prayer books for the recitation of the rosary as a helpful tool to encourage penance on the Franciscan missions.

This miracle aroused a popular devotion and turned Evviva Maria into a popular hit which would as Romans enjoyed chanting it before the lam-illuminated Madonnas in the public streets. This devotion struck many pilgrims and travelers, as in 1836., in 1838, the English voyager William J. Alban Sheehy, and similarly, French Trappist monk Ferdinand de Géramb. or even American traveller Henry P. Leland in 1861. In 1866, Scottish historian James Aitken Wylie recalls hearing ciociari pilgrims singing Evviva Maria at the sanctuary of Loreto "at the top of their voices". At that time, Evviva Maria became strongly associated with Italian peasant fervour. On another hand, it was despised as an excessive expression of popular piety as in the case of the pious movements linked to Oratory of San Francesco Saverio del Caravita led by the Jesuits in Rome as it was highly praised by other Jesuits of the late 19th century such as Felix-Joseph Barbelin in Philadelphia.

After 1837, German diplomat Alfred von Reumont noted that lyrics had been added to a new verse in thanksgiving for this miraculous protection of Mary over the city of Rome: "Evviva Maria, Maria evviva, Evviva Maria Che Roma salvó."

=== Marian dogma of 1854 and international spread ===
After the proclamation of the Dogma of the Immaculate Conception was pronounced, Pope Pius IX encouraged Marian devotion by his brief of 10 July 1854 annexing an indulgence of three hundred days to the recitation of this hymn. The papal encouragement was echoed across the Roman Catholic Church as it was encouraged as such for instance by the Compagnia della Misericordia in Florence among other places, adding an eleventh verse with local specificities such as the mention of the Arno river.

After this papal encouragement, Evviva Maria became a rallying cry for Catholics universally. Thus, in 1852, archbishop of Dublin Cardinal Paul Cullen headed one of his letters as Evviva Maria as he led the movement toward the emancipation to obtain freedom for Catholics in Ireland.

In 1855, it was adopted in the Marian prayer books of the archdiocese of Palermo in Sicily.

In 1860, American songwriter Henry T. Rocholl arranged a four-part arrangement of Evviva Maria published in his Catholic Vocalist compilation. In the late 1870s, this English translation was circulating in England and it reached a point where it became an Marian hymn equal in honour and popularity with the Latin Gregrorian hymn Ave maris stella. In an English parochial hymn book approved jointly by Cardinal Manning and by Cardinal John Henry Newman, this popular hymn was translated in 1881 as an "invitation to all creatures to praise Mary, the Mother of Jesus and our Mother".

In her 1866 novel A Sisters' story, French author Pauline Marie Armande Craven confirms that Evviva Maria had become a classical piece in France as well, as it could be sung on major feasts, such as Christmas.

In 1873, the Franciscan friars of Tuscany included the Evviva Maria in their missionary effort to encourage Marian devotion

From 1867, it became more and more universal and reached youth movements in ordinary parishes as it became one of the hymns of the Daughters of Mary, founded by Lateran canon Alberto Passeri.

In a tale written in 1882, Jesuit priest William Henry Anderdon sets a group of peasants interpreting Evviva Maria in Rome in 1812.

In 1883, a popular tradition in the sanctuary of la Madonna dei Miracoli in the Abruzzan town of Casalbordino. In 1885, George F. Dillon noted that it was always Evviva Maria which was taken up by the pilgrims and sometimes shouted out as a victory cry at the sanctuary of Our Lady of Good Counsel in Genazzano, near Rome. It truly became a universal hymn as it could even be sung by a French choir in Westminster, England in 1886.

Evviva Maria would also become a rallying cry for the rites of coronation of the Virgin Mary in various sanctuaries from the Madonna della Guardia in Genova to Santa Maria Maggiore in Rome.

In 1903, Evviva Maria was strongly associated with Franciscan missions across Italy, as documented by Danish traveller Johannes Jørgensen.

In 1926, this "oft-repeated" Franciscan ritornello was still strange for English traveller Harold Elsdale Goad fascinated by fascism on his journey to Italy.

In the 1950s, it was one of the Catholic hymns well known among the Italian diaspora. and even well into 1970 in a "brassy rendition" by the Italian community of the Bronx.

=== Second Vatican Council to present day ===
Evviva Maria was one of the vernacular songs which predated by many centuries the Second Vatican Council which allowed the use of such languages in the Catholic liturgy. After the Second Vatican Council, in 1969, it was still an impressive expression of religious feelings in the basilica of Santa Maria Maggiore in Rome but around the same time, it was associated with "black old women clutching candles as tall as themselves [shrieking] in unison" in Calabria.

Through the 1980s and until today, this hymn remains widely popular on feast days of the Virgin Mary and in sanctuaries devoted to the Blessed Mother in Rome, at the Santuario della Madonna del Divino Amore in Southern Italy, Sicily where it is sung along the Dio vi salvi Regina and also in Corsica since the first mission of Leonardo di Porto Maurizio. At the Sanctuary of the Incoronata in Puglia, for example, Evviva Maria is a hymn made for "ceaseless chanting" during the robing of the Virgin and Child.

== Lyrics ==
Lyrics of Evviva Maria have a consistent chorus and widely variable verses according to the processions the hymn accompanies. The 39-verse version of Saint Leonard of the first half of the 18th century, the 10-verse version of Liguori of 1826 and the 22-verse version of the Sanctuary of Caravaggio of the Madonna di Piné from 1844 are a witness to the antiquity of such variability.

== Melody ==
The popular tone of Evviva Maria wedded to a peculiarly beautiful though simple melody is of unknown origin. It espouses the same musical lines of the relative major of the Follia, in which dominant harmonies are of a minor key (usually D minor).

Giuseppe Baini composed a five-voice canon on Evviva Maria when he was musical director to the choir of the pontifical chapel no earlier than 1814.

Another famous musical setting is the one used during the procession from the sanctuary of Pietraquaria, which was written in 1899 by the lawyer A. Lolli and set to music by the master Emilio Perotti 1880 of Avezzano in L'Aquila to transmit the apparitions which happened in 1614.

American songwriter Henry T. Rocholl arranged a four-part arrangement of Evviva Maria published in his Catholic Vocalist collection of sacred music.

== Cultural references ==
=== Literature ===
In her 1866 novel A Sisters' story, French author Pauline Marie Armande Craven confirms that Evviva Maria had become a classical piece in France as well, as it could be sung on major feasts, such as Christmas.

Poet Augusta Theodosia Drane in her 1876 poem entitled Mentana refers to Evviva Maria as a "battle cry".

American novelist Mary Agnes Tincker refers to Evviva Maria in her novel The Two Coronets (1887) which she associates with "little dirty children [...] sitting in the dust of the road".

English writer Wilfrid Ward suggested in one of his novels that the bells of Venice could ring out the melody of Evviva Maria.

=== Film ===
Evviva Maria was featured as a diegetic musical background "caricaturing [...] church processions honoring the Virgin Mary" in The Miracle, directed by Roberto Rossellini, starring Anna Magnani and Federico Fellini, and which was condemned by the National Legion of Decency as "anti-Catholic" and "sacrilegious" and in February 1951 the New York State Board of Regents, in charge of film censorship for the state, which then revoked the license to show the film.

=== Music ===
In 1978, music critic Iriving Kolodin referred to the Marian hymn in suggesting in an obituary that aficionados could salute the newly deceased Maria Callas with a "fervent Evviva Maria".

In 1990, Italian pop singer Peppino di Capri used the same title in his single "Evviva Maria".

== Bibliography ==
- La tradizione dell'Evviva Maria a S. Andrea di Rometta (in Italian). UNI Service. 2007. ISBN 978-88-6178-047-7.
