= Rex Sempiterne Cælitum =

Rex Sempiterne Cælitum was a Catholic hymn that was sung in Matins during the Paschal season until 1962.
