= In Splendoribus Sanctorum =

Latin Christian hymn

The chant In splendoribus sanctorum is the communion chant for the propers of Christmas midnight mass, sung during the distribution of holy communion. This short chant is a rare example of pure pentatonic music used in chant, and for this reason it is impossible to say which mode it belongs to. The Latin text of the chant, a passage from Psalm 110 (Vulgate 109) in the Old Testament, is: In splendoribus sanctorum, ex utero, ante luciferum, genui te; in English, "In the brightness of the saints: from the womb before the day star I begot you." (Douay Bible, 1610). Traditionally parallels are therefore made to the story of the nativity.
