= Sanctorum Meritis =

Sanctorum Meritis was the hymn at First and Second Vespers in the Common of the Martyrs in the Roman Breviary.
