= Peter Scholtes =

American priest and author (1938–2009)

Peter Raymond Scholtes
- Born: November 20, 1938; Evanston, Illinois
- Died: July 11, 2009 (aged 70); Madison, Wisconsin
- Occupation(s): Priest, author
- Notable work: They'll Know We Are Christians (song); "The Team Handbook" (book)

Peter Raymond Scholtes (November 20, 1938 – July 11, 2009) was a priest, consultant, and author. In the 1960s, as a parish priest and choral conductor, Scholtes wrote the hymn "They'll Know We Are Christians by Our Love" for an ecumenical event.

By the 1980s, Scholtes had left the priesthood and become a business management consultant and author. He co-authored The Team Handbook, which was named one of The 100 Best Business Books of All Time. His best-known book is The Leader's Handbook, from 1998.

Scholtes was a colleague of W. Edwards Deming and was a recipient of the Deming Award in 2006.
