= Catholic Marian music =

Catholic Marian music shares a trait with some other forms of Christian music in adding another emotional dimension to the process of veneration and in being used in various Marian ceremonies and feasts. Marian music is now an inherent element in many aspects of the veneration of the Blessed Virgin Mary in Catholic Mariology.

Throughout the centuries Marian music has grown and progressed, and witnessed a resurgence along with the Renaissance, e.g. with the composition of the Ave Maria motet by Josquin des Prez. The tradition continued with a number of great composers up to the late 19th century, e.g. with Giuseppe Verdi's Ave Maria in 1880 followed by his Laudi alla Vergine Maria.

== Saint Ambrose ==
One of the oldest Marian intonations is credited to Saint Ambrose of Milan (339-374). The Church names an ancient liturgy after him (Ambrosian Rite), which is actually older but nonetheless traditionally attributed to him. Some 870 parishes in the diocese of Milan still use the ancient Ambrosian rite. Several Ambrosian rite Marian texts were intonated, for example the famous Gaude:

Gaude et latare
Exultation angelorum
Gaude domini virgo
Prophetarum gaudium
Gaudeas benedicta
Dominus tecum est
Gaude, que per angelum gaudium mundi suscepisti
Gaude que genuisti factorum et Dominum
Gaudeas que dignas es esse mater Christi

Marian hymns by Ambrose include the Confractorium from the Christmas liturgy and in a poetic creation of Saint Ambrose celebrating the Mother of God: Intende, qui Regis Israel.

== Marian music for the Liturgy of the Hours ==
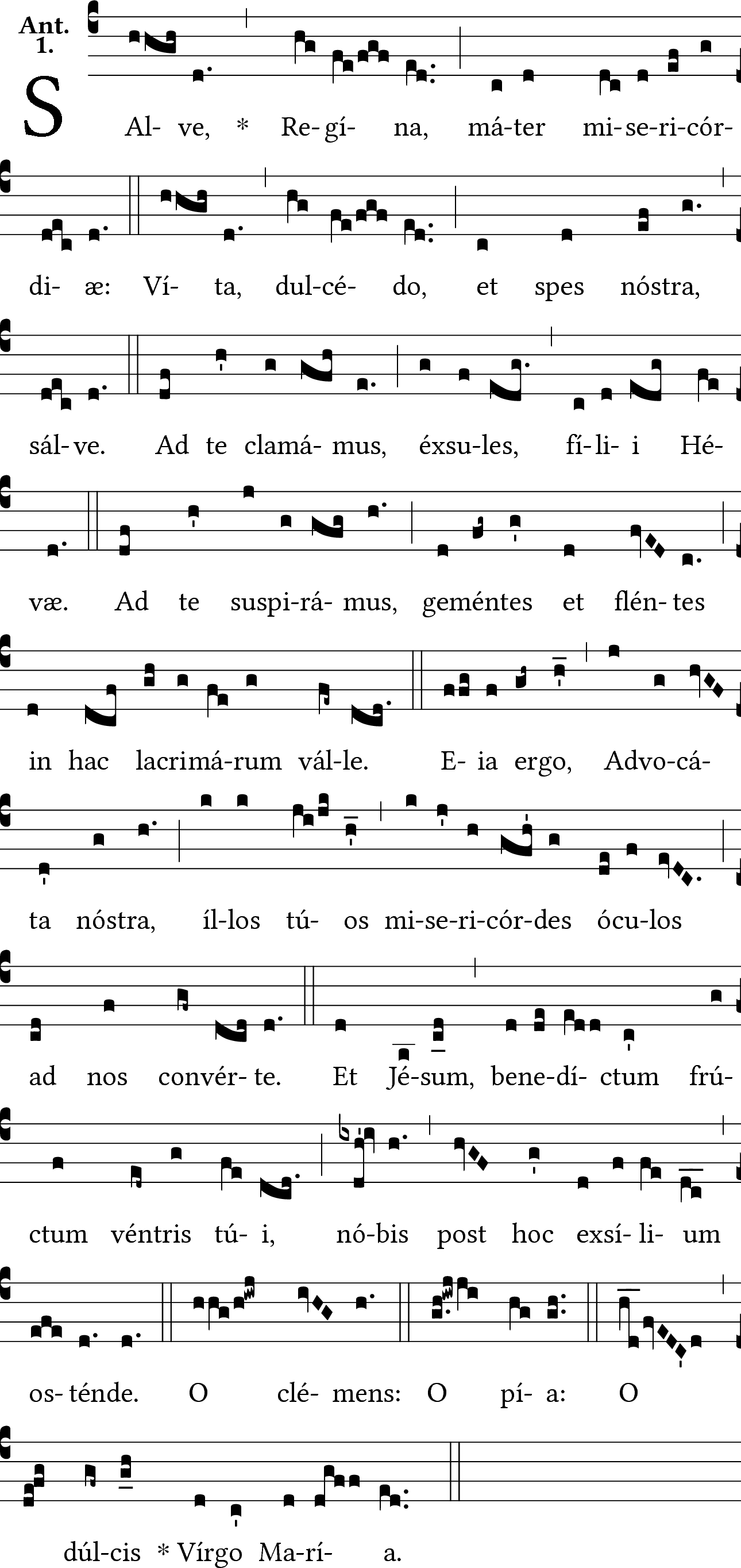

One of the earliest medieval Marian compositions is the popular Salve Regina in Latin from a Benedictine monk at the Reichenau Island (Lake Constance), which exists in several Gregorian versions. The liturgy of the hour includes several offices to be sung. At the close of the Office, one of four Marian antiphons is sung. These songs, Alma Redemptoris Mater, Ave Regina caelorum, Regina caeli, and Salve Regina, have been described as "among the most beautiful creations of the late Middle Ages."

Alma Redemptoris Mater
Marian antiphon sung at Compline and Lauds between the First Sunday of Advent and Candlemas

Other Marian supplications exist in numerous Latin versions as well. It is difficult to trace the beginning of non-Gregorian Marian liturgical music. In the year 1277 Pope Nicholas III prescribed rules for liturgy in Roman churches. Three years later, in 1280, Petrus de Cruce published his Marian anthem Ave virgo regia, Ave gloriosa O maria Maris stella. Later, composer Pérotin followed with his Alleluja, Navitatis gloriosae virginis, to be sung at the feast of the birth of Mary. Marian motets became very popular in the Middle Ages, a large collection of which is in St. Paul Cathedral in London. Pope John XXII (1316–34) issued the apostolic constitution Docta SS Patrum about Church music. It was the first modern music regulations for musical presentation during the liturgy

Monteverdi's Vespro della Beata Vergine has remained structurally unchanged for the past 1500 years. It contains distinctly Marian texts among its 13 movements, though the composer's intention for the work as a whole is debated.Wolfgang Amadeus Mozart composed in honour of the Virgin Mary Latin Masses and several shorter operas. Other known classic composers with Marian compositions mainly in Latin include Orlando di Lasso and Franz Schubert.

Vivaldi, Monteverdi, Mozart, Haydn, and others are well-known composers who contributed to Marian music. Less known is the fact that before German mediatisation of 1802, many religious congregations in Germany had their own composers. A totally unknown Father Valentin Rathgeber, OSB, (1682–1750) wrote 43 Masses, 164 offertories, 24 concerts, and 44 Marian antiphones. Missa de Beata Virgine and the Messe de Nostre Dame are examples of individual contributions.

== Marian plays and songs ==
In 12th century France the tradition began of Christmas dramas, in which the nativity events are reproduced by actors. This became popular in other European countries and is seen as the origin of popular Christmas carols, which were an integral part of the Christmas drama. These early Christmas songs are largely devotions to the Mother of God. Early manifestations are in Bavaria in the 12th century. At the same time, Easter songs are often converted into Marian hymns, for example the hymn Te virgini Mariae laudes concinant Christianae. The assumption of Mary is praised in numerous songs from the 10th century, In several songs, Mary is praised to be above all saints and angels and participates in the kingdom of her son. Her assumption is “wished by the faithful people” in a song from the 12th century. The Marian songs and hymns in this epoch are too numerous to mention. They include pious excitement, even some exaggerations, and valuable insights into the Marian belief, especially in the assumption.

== Ave, salve, and gaude hymns ==
Examples of Ave (Hail Mary) songs include:

Ave dei genitrix, caelstium terrestrium infernorum domina;
Ave spes mundi, Maria, ave mitis, ave pia
Ave plena, signulari gratia

Examples of Salve songs include:

Salve regina, mater misericordiae
Salve prodis Davidis
Salve Mater Misericordiae

Gaude (Rejoice) hymns include:

Gaude Maria templum summae majestatis
Gaude mater luminis
Gaude, plaude, clara Rosa

Vale (farewell) and Mater dolorosa (mother of sorrows) are also subjects of numerous Marian hymns.

== Holy Mass music ==
It seems that settings of the Ordinary of the Mass are a later development than Liturgy of the Hours music. Modern Kyriales designate two Gregorian chant Mass settings for Marian feasts, In solemnitatibus et Festis Beatae Mariae Virginis and in Festis et Memoriis. Before the Council of Trent the Gloria of the first of these contained the trope Spiritus et alme orphanorum paraclete, heard in Josquin's Missa de Beata Virgine but not in Machault's Messe de Nostre Dame which was written as a Votive Mass. The list of compositions by Giovanni Pierluigi da Palestrina includes numerous Marian masses:

- Missa Salve Regina
- Missa Alma Redemptoris
- Missa Assumpta est Maria
- Missa Regina coeli
- Missa de beata Virgine
- Missa Ave Regina coelorum
- Missa Descendit Angelus Domini
- Missa O Virgo simul et Mater

== Marian music during the Baroque period ==
The Marian music in the baroque period is strongly influenced by the Latin tradition, but develops its own characteristics. Marian songs venerate her exceptional sanctity. Many Marian songs have the form of litanies, expressing veneration of Mary. Others moralize the faithful in light of her virtuous life. In Poland and Hungary, baroque Marian compositions stress her national protective powers for the Polish and Hungarian nation, an aspect largely missing in Italy, France, and Germany, where Mary is likely to be called upon to protect a city or region rather than a nation. Many Latin Marian hymns are now translated into a vernacular language, especially in Germany under the influence of Lutheran use of the vernacular in liturgy. Latin texts are often enriched with flowery reverences and Marian praises. Like Marian poetry, Marian music has flourished most in Italy, Spain, Portugal, and France, countries uninfluenced by the reformation.

Before the German secularisations of 1802 many religious congregations had their own composers. In the monastery of Andechs, Father Nonnosus Madleder, in Ottobeuren, Father Franx Schnizer, in Irsee, Father Meinrad Spiess, and in Banz, Father Valentin Rathgeber, OSB, (1682–1750): 43 Masses, 164 offertories, 24 concerts, and 44 Marian antiphones.

== Marian music in the Enlightenment era ==
Besides the above-mentioned Vespers, Joseph Haydn wrote several Marian compositions including two famous Marian Masses, the Missa Cellensis in honorem Beatissimae Virginis Mariae, No. 5 in E flat major, also known as the Grosse Orgelmesse (Great Organ Mass) (H. 22/4) (1766) and the Missa Cellensis in honorem Beatissimae Virginis Mariae No. 3 in C major (H. 22/5) (1766–73).

== Romantic Marian music ==
Several motets by Anton Bruckner are related to Mary, including three settings of Ave Maria. Max Reger composed the motet Unser lieben Frauen Traum in 1914.

== Contemporary Marian music ==
Francis Poulenc composed Litanies à la Vierge Noire and a Stabat Mater in 1950. Arvo Pärt composed several works related to Mary, including a Magnificat in 1989 and a Salve Regina in 2001.

The Franciscan Helmut Schlegel wrote in 2009 a hymn, "Glauben können wie du", addressing Mary and wanting to imitate her virtues faith, hope and love. It was included in 2015 in an oratorio, Laudato si', which narrates stations of her life, quoting the Magnificat.

== Sources ==
- Marian Music Collection at the University of Dayton
- Konrad Algermissen, Lexikon der Marienkunde, Pustet, Regensburg, 1967
- Remigius Bäumer, Leo Scheffczyk (Hrsg.) Marienlexikon Gesamtausgabe, Institutum Marianum Regensburg, 1994, ISBN 3-88096-891-8 (cit. Bäumer)
