= September 1 (Eastern Orthodox liturgics) =

Day in the Eastern Orthodox liturgical calendar

Eastern Orthodox liturgical calendar
August 31	September 1	September 2
September 1 O.S. ≍ September 14 N.S. September 1 N.S ≍ August 19 O.S.

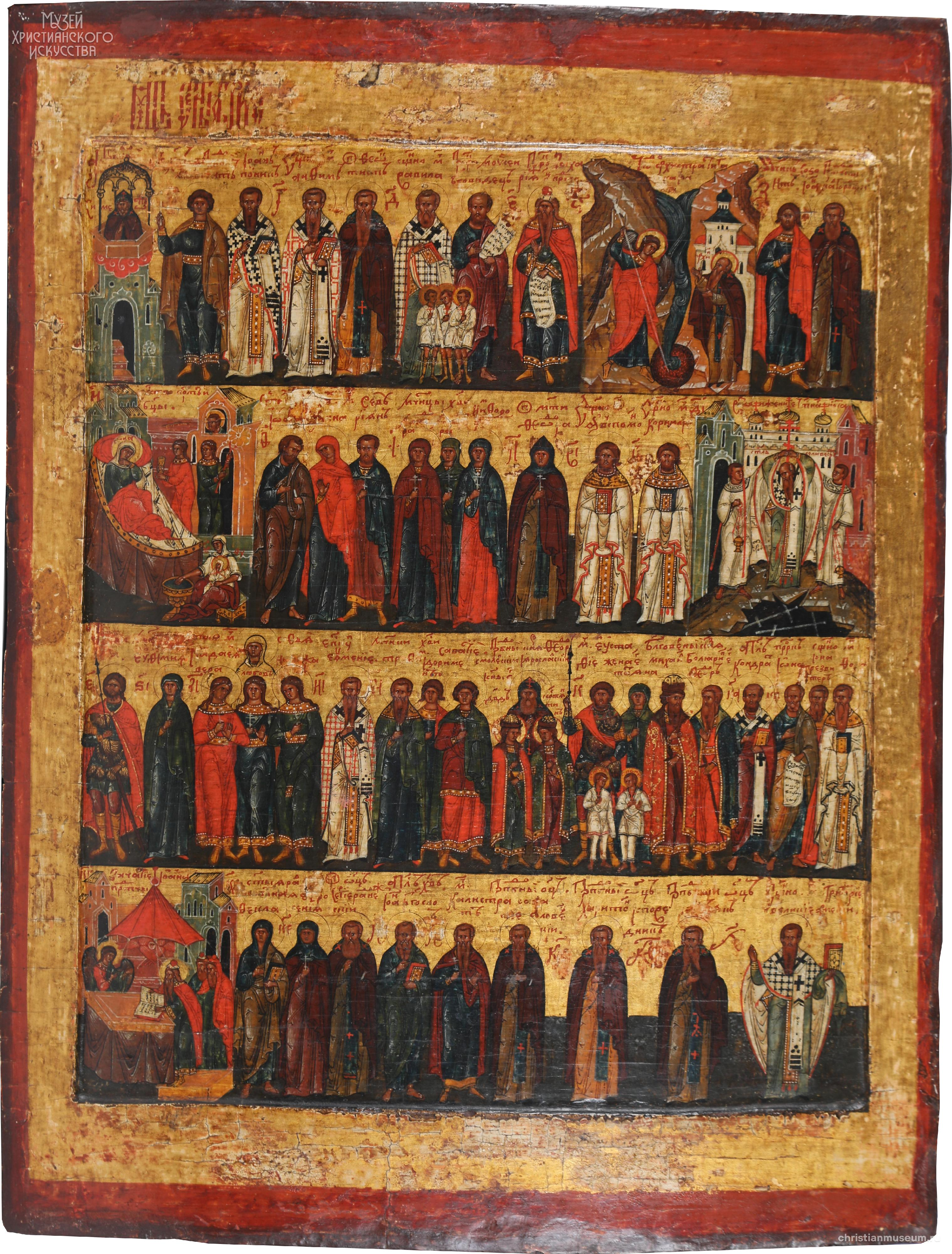
Menaion calendar icon - September.

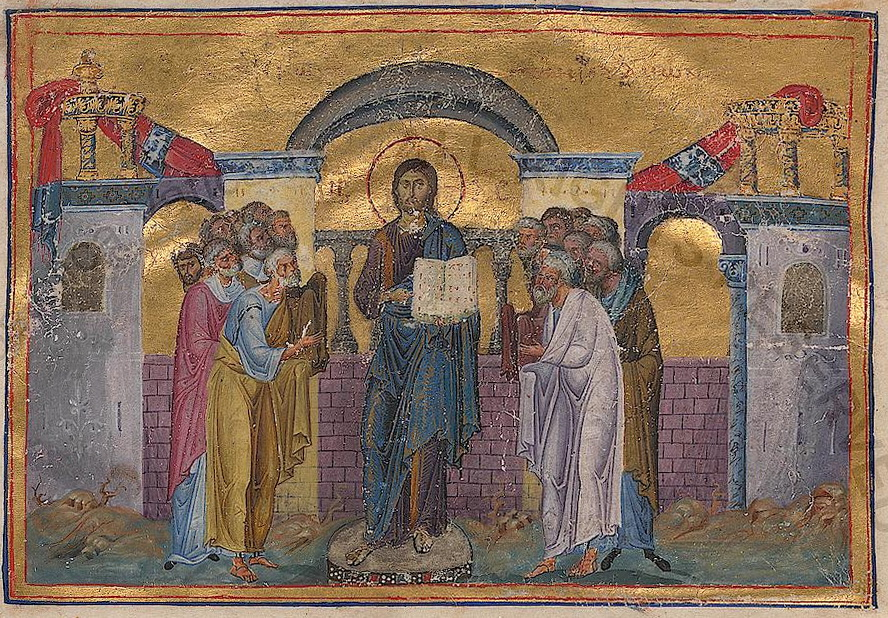
Christ Pantocrator. Main miniature for September 1, the Indiction. (Menologion of Basil II, 10th century).

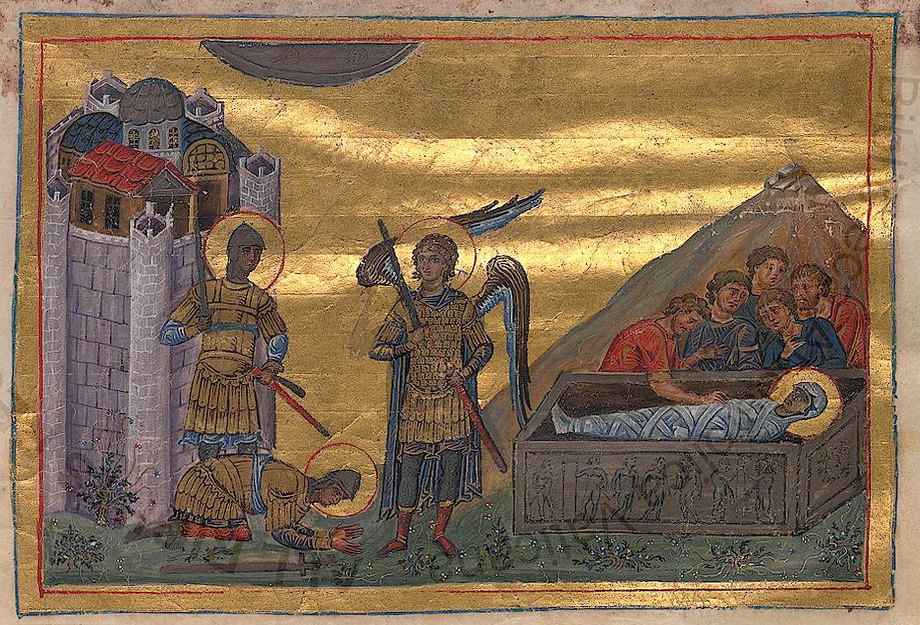
Righteous Joshua. (Menologion of Basil II, 10th century).

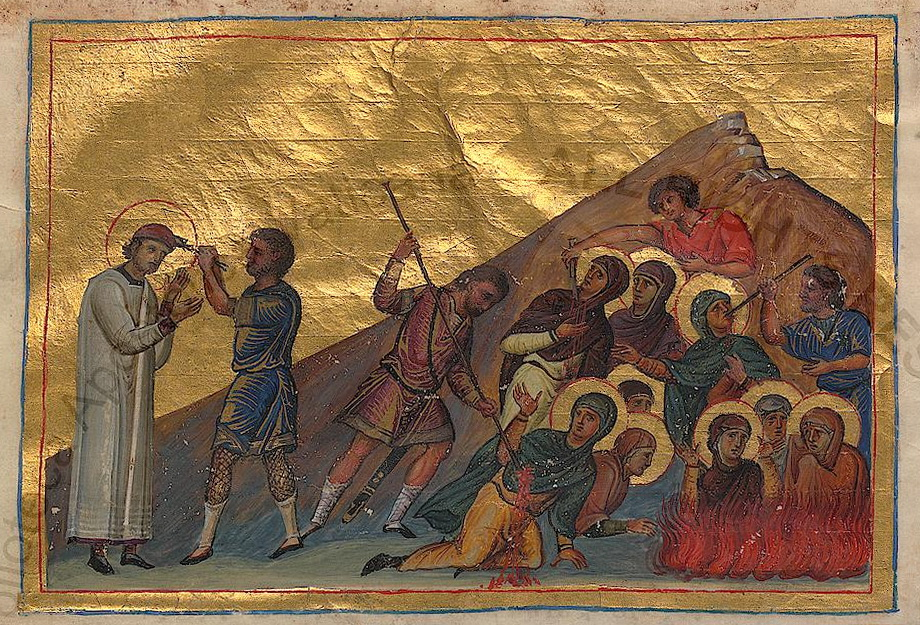
Martyr Ammon the Deacon and Holy 40 ascetic virgin-martyrs at Heraclea in Thrace. (Menologion of Basil II, 10th century).

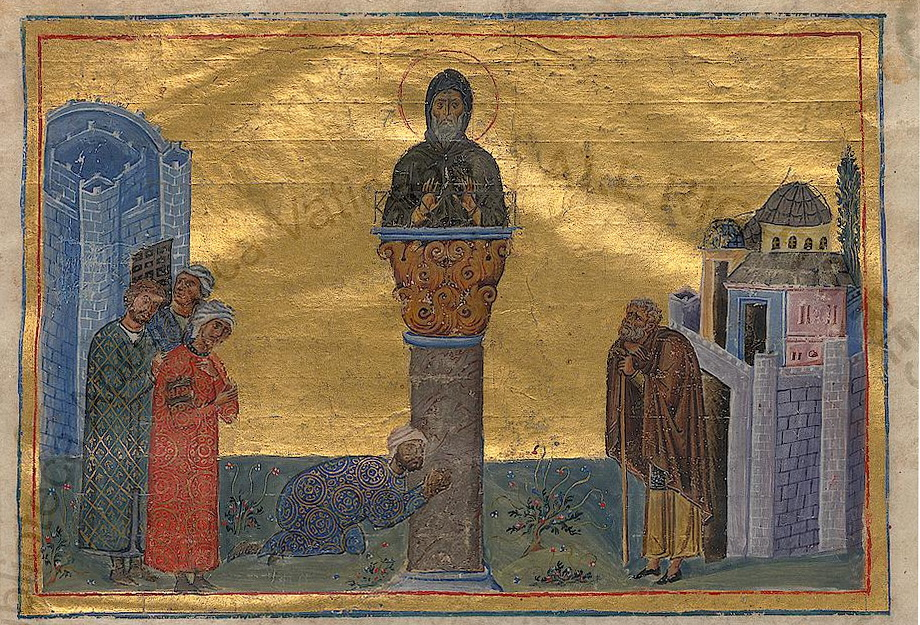
St. Simeon Stylites the Elder. (Menologion of Basil II, 10th century).

September 1 in Eastern Orthodox liturgical calendars is a feast day and a day of commemoration of saints and martyrs. Although some Orthodox churches use the Revised Julian Calendar and others use the traditional Julian calendar, the fixed commemorations for their respective September 1 are broadly the same, no matter which calendar is used. (Note: Despite the dates being the same, the days to which they refer typically differ by 13 days. The notation Old Style or O.S. is sometimes used to indicate a date in the traditional Julian Calendar (the "Old Calendar"). The notation New Style or N.S. indicates a date in the Revised Julian calendar (the "New Calendar").) September 1 is traditionally considered to be the first day of the Eastern Orthodox liturgical calendar year.

== Feasts ==
- Feast of the Indiction, beginning the Liturgical Year. (Note: Some Greeks fast from today till the Elevation of the Cross.) (Note: KONDAK OF THE INDICTION, TONE 2: "O Christ, the King Who dwells on high, the Creator and Fashioner of everything visible and invisible, You, Who order the days and nights, times and seasons, Bless now the crown of the year, guarding and protecting Your city and people in peace, O Most Merciful One.")
- Feast of Creation or World Day of Prayer for Creation (Eastern Orthodox Earth Day) (1989) (Note: Since 1989, every September 1st (the beginning of the ecclesiastical calendar) has been designated as a day of prayer for "the protection of the environment" throughout the Eastern Orthodox Church. Instituted by Patriarch Dimitrios of the Greek Orthodox Church in 1989, the tradition has since been shepherded by his successor Patriarch Bartholomew I of Constantinople who has been dubbed "The Green Patriarch.": "...Accordingly, we declare the first day of September of each year a day on which, on the feast of the Indiction, namely the first day of the ecclesiastical year, prayers and supplications are to be offered in this holy center of Orthodoxy for all creation, declaring this day to be the day of the protection of the environment."; Ecumenical Patriarchate: (in Greek) Πατριαρχική καί Ἀρχιερατική Χοροστασία. -- "Ἡ ἡμέρα αὐτή τῆς ἀρχῆς τῆς Ἰνδίκτου ἀφιεροῦται εἰς τήν προστασίαν τοῦ φυσικοῦ περιβάλλοντος. Ὁ ἑορτασμός ἐθεσπίσθη κατά τήν Συνεδρίαν τῆς Ἁγίας καί Ἱερᾶς Συνόδου τῇ 6ῃ Ἰουνίου 1989.") (Note: In July 2015, the Holy Synod of the Russian Orthodox Church also established a day of special prayer for God’s creation at its meeting on July 13, 2015, in St. Petersburg (Minutes no. 41), deciding to establish the day of special prayer on the first Sunday of September. It stated that September 1 – the date fixed by the heads of Local Orthodox Churches at their meeting of 2008 – would be inconvenient, as there would an overlapping of other services at the beginning of the academic year.; In August 2015, The Vatican also announced a "World Day of Prayer for the Care of Creation", to be celebrated annually on September 1, in line with the Orthodox Church’s day for the protection of the environment.)

== Saints ==
- Righteous Joshua, the son of Nun (c. 16th century BC) (Note: "In Palestine, the Saints Josue and Gedeon.")
- Martyrs Callista and her brothers Evodos and Hermogenes at Nicomedia (309)
- Holy 40 virgin-martyrs and their teacher the Hieromartyr Ammon the Deacon at Heraclea in Thrace (321-323): (Note: "At Heraclea, St. Ammon, deacon, and forty holy virgins whom he instructed in the faith, and led with him to the glory of matryrdom, under the tyrant Licinius.")

- Laurencia the deaconess; Celsina; Theoclia; Theoctista; Dorothy; Eutychia; Thecla; Aristaineta; Philadelphia; Mary; Veronica; Euthymia; Lamprotatia; Euphymia; Theodora; Theodota; Teteia; Aquilina; Theodulia; Aplodora; Lampadia; Procopia; Paula; Junilla; Ampliana; Percissa; Polynicia; Maura; Gregoria; Kyriake; Bassa; Callinica; Barbara; Cyriena; Agathonica; Justa; Irene; Timothea; Tatiana; and Anna.

- Martyr Aeithalas the Deacon of Persia (380)
- Venerable Martha, the mother of St Simeon Stylites (428)
- Venerable Simeon Stylites the Elder (459) (Note: KONDAK TO THE VENERABLE SIMEON, TONE 2: "You sought the heights though you were not parted from things below, your pillar became a chariot of fire. Therefore, you converse with the angels; and with them, O righteous one, you pray to God unceasingly for all of us.")
- Venerable Evanthia.
- Saint Dionysius Exiguus, inventor of the Anno Domini (AD) era (c. 544) (Note: He was born in Scythia, in modern-day Romania. He moved to Rome at the end of the 5th century and translated a number of lives and works of the saints into Latin, as well as collections of Church canons. He also compiled tables for calculating the date of Pascha and introduced the practice of dating from the Nativity of Christ.)
- Saint Symeon Stylites of Lesbos (c. 845) (Note: Commemorated together with his brothers David and George of Mytilene on February 1.)

== Pre-Schism Western saints ==
- Hieromartyr Priscus of Capua, first Bishop of Capua in Italy, where he was sent by the Apostle Peter, and martyred under Nero by tradition (c. 66) (Note: "At Capua, on the Aquarian road, St. Priscus, martyr, who was one of the ancient disciples of Christ.")
- Hieromartyr Terentian, Bishop of Todi in Umbria in Italy, under Hadrian (118) (Note: "At Todi, in Umbria, St. Terentian, bishop and martyr. Under the emperor Adrian, he was racked, and scourged with whips set with metal by order of the proconsul Laetian, and finally, having his tongue cut out, he ended his martyrdom by undergoing capital punishment.")
- Virgin-martyr Vibiana, in Rome, whose relics are now venerated in Los Angeles, of which she is the main patron-saint (3rd century)
- Saint Sixtus of Reims, first Bishop of Rheims in France (c. 300) (Note: "At Rheims, in France, St. Xystus, disciple of the blessed apostle Peter, who was consecrated by him the first bishop of that city, and received the crown of martyrdom under Nero.")
- Hieromartyr Firminus of Amiens, third Bishop of Amiens in France (c. 303)
- The 12 Holy Brothers, Martyrs, who suffered in the south of Italy and were brought together and enshrined at Benevento in 760 (c. 303):

- Donatus, Felix, Arontius, Honoratus, Fortunatus, Sabinian, Septimius, Januarius, another Felix, Vitalis, Sator, and Repositus. (Note: "At Benevento, twelve saintly brothers, martyrs.")

- Saint Verena of Zurzach, Switzerland (c. 350) (Note: An Egyptian related to a soldier of the Theban Legion, she travelled to Switzerland in search of him and settled as an anchoress near Zurich.)
- Saint Victorius (Victurius), a disciple of St. Martin of Tours who became Bishop of Le Mans in France in c. 453 (c. 490)
- Saint Constantius of Aquino, Bishop of Aquino in Italy (c. 520) (Note: "At Aquino, St. Constantius, a bishop renowned for the gift of prophecy and many virtues.")
- Saint Regulus (San Regolo), exiled from North Africa by the Arian Vandals, he landed in Tuscany in Italy and was martyred under Totila (545) (Note: "At Piombino, in Tuscany, St. Regulus, martyr, who went thither from Africa, and consummated his martyrdom under Totila.")
- Saint Lupus of Sens, a monk at Lérins who became Bishop of Sens in France in 609 (623) (Note: "At Sens, St. Lupus, bishop and confessor, of whom it is related, that on a certain day, whilst he stood at the holy altar in presence of the clergy, a gem fell from heaven into the consecrated chalice which he was using.")
- Saint Nivard of Rheims, Archbishop of Rheims in France (673)
- Saint Giles of Nîmes (Aegidius), monastic founder along the Rhone (c. 712) (Note: "IN THE province of Narbonne, St. Giles, abbot and confessor.")
- Saint Lythan (Llythaothaw), a saint in Wales to whom two churches are dedicated.
- Saints Giles (Aegidius) and Arcanus, founded a monastery that later grew into Borgo San Sepulcro in central Italy (1050)

== Post-Schism Orthodox saints ==
- Saint Meletius the Younger, of Thebes (1105) (Note: Meletius the New of the Mountain of Myoupolis.)
- Venerable Nicholas of Courtaliatis in Crete, monk (1670)
- New-Martyr Angelis of Constantinople (1680)
- Venerable Anthony of Agyia.
- Saint Haido of Stanos (1820-1821)

=== New Martys and Confessors ===
- Virgin-martyrs Tatiana Gribkov and Natalia Kozlov (1937)

== Other commemorations ==
- Commemoration of the Great Fire of Constantinople (c. 470)
- Synaxis of the Most-Holy Theotokos of Miasena Monastery, in memory of the finding of her icon (864)
- Celebration of the first miracle of the Icon of the Theotokos (Eletskaya) at Chernigov-Gethsemane (Chernihiv-Hefsemanska) (1869) (Note: See: (in Russian): ИЛЬИНСКАЯ ЧЕРНИГОВСКАЯ ИКОНА БОЖИЕЙ МАТЕРИ. Православная Энциклопедия. Russian Orthodox Encyclopedia.)
- Celebration of the "All-Blessed" or "Pamakarista" Icon (11th century) of Our Lady of Kazan (1905) (Note: In 1905, Patriarch Joachim III presented a copy of the icon to the city of Kazan in Russia.)

== Icon gallery ==
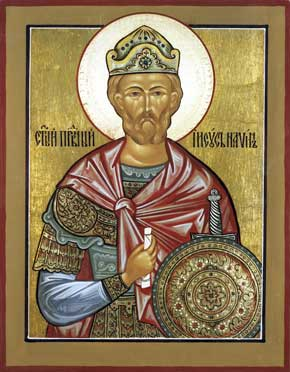
Icon of Jesus of Navi (Joshua).

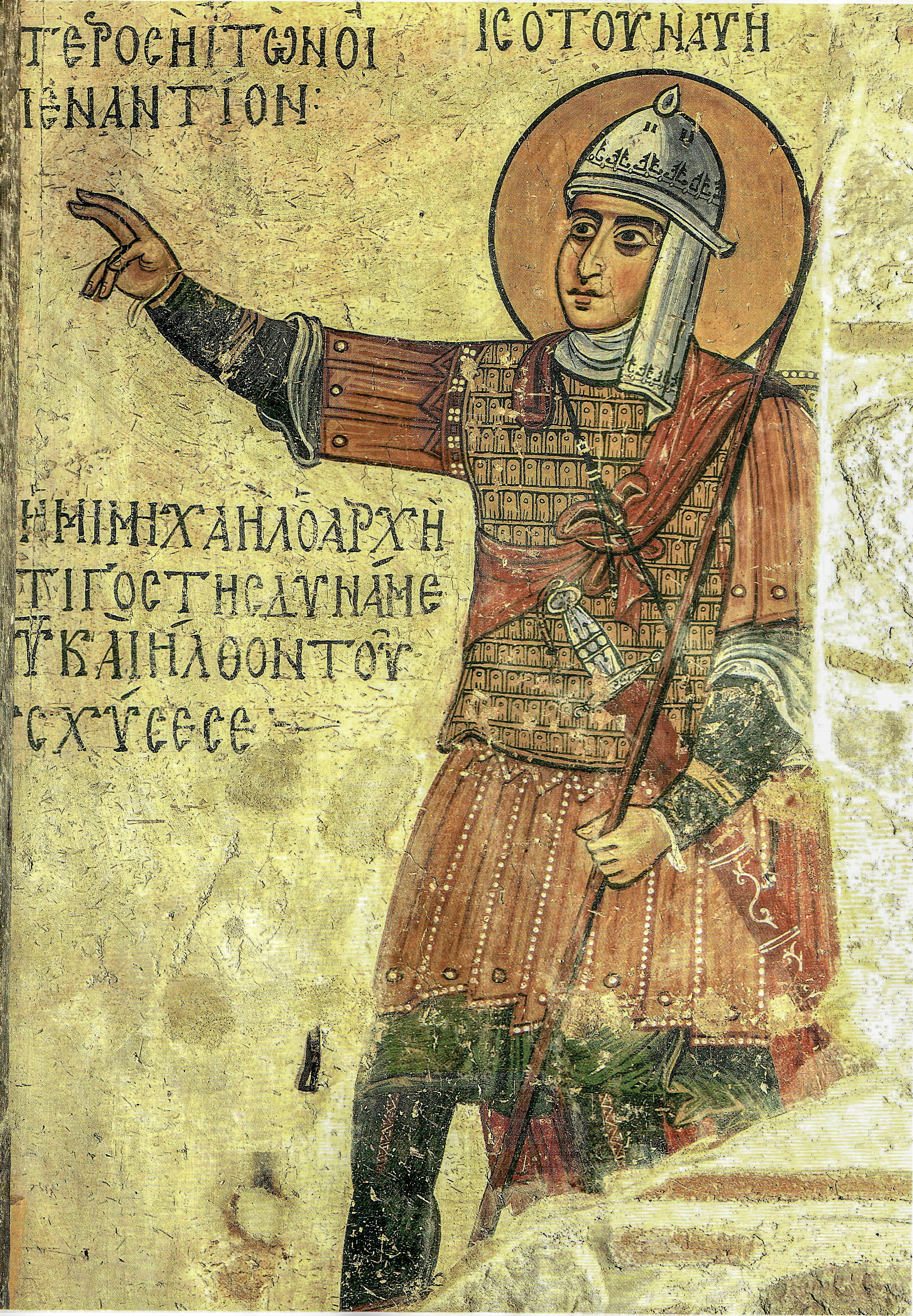
Righteous Joshua, the son of Nun.
(Fresco from Hosios Loukas monastery in Boeotia, Greece).

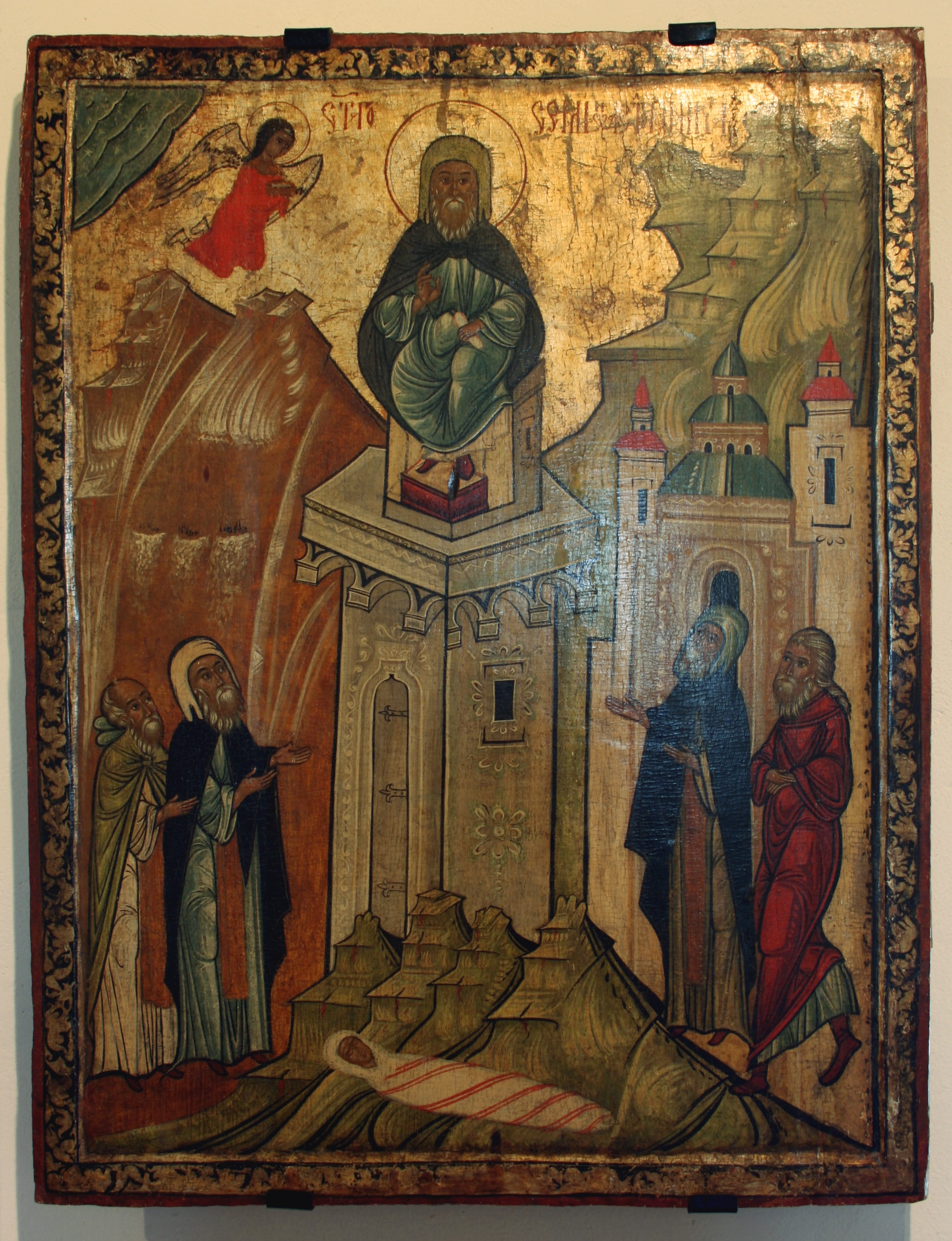
St. Simeon Stylites the Elder.
(Second half of the 16th century, Kostarowce, Historic Museum in Sanok, Poland).

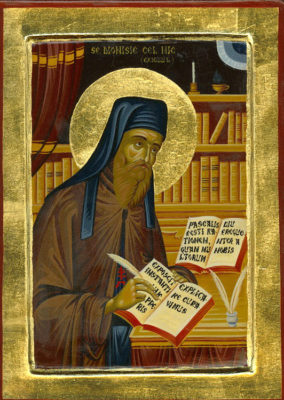
St. Dionysius Exiguus.

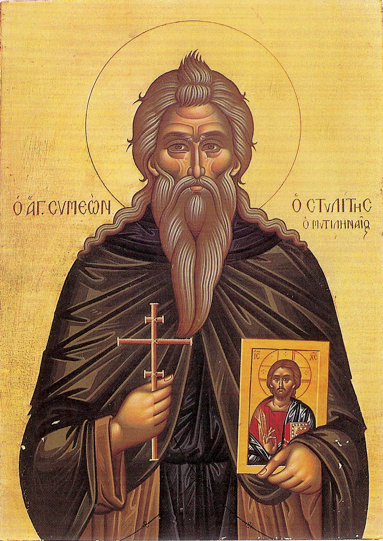
St. Symeon Stylites of Lesbos.

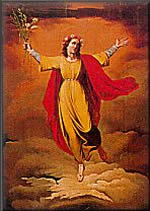
St. Vibiana (19th century).

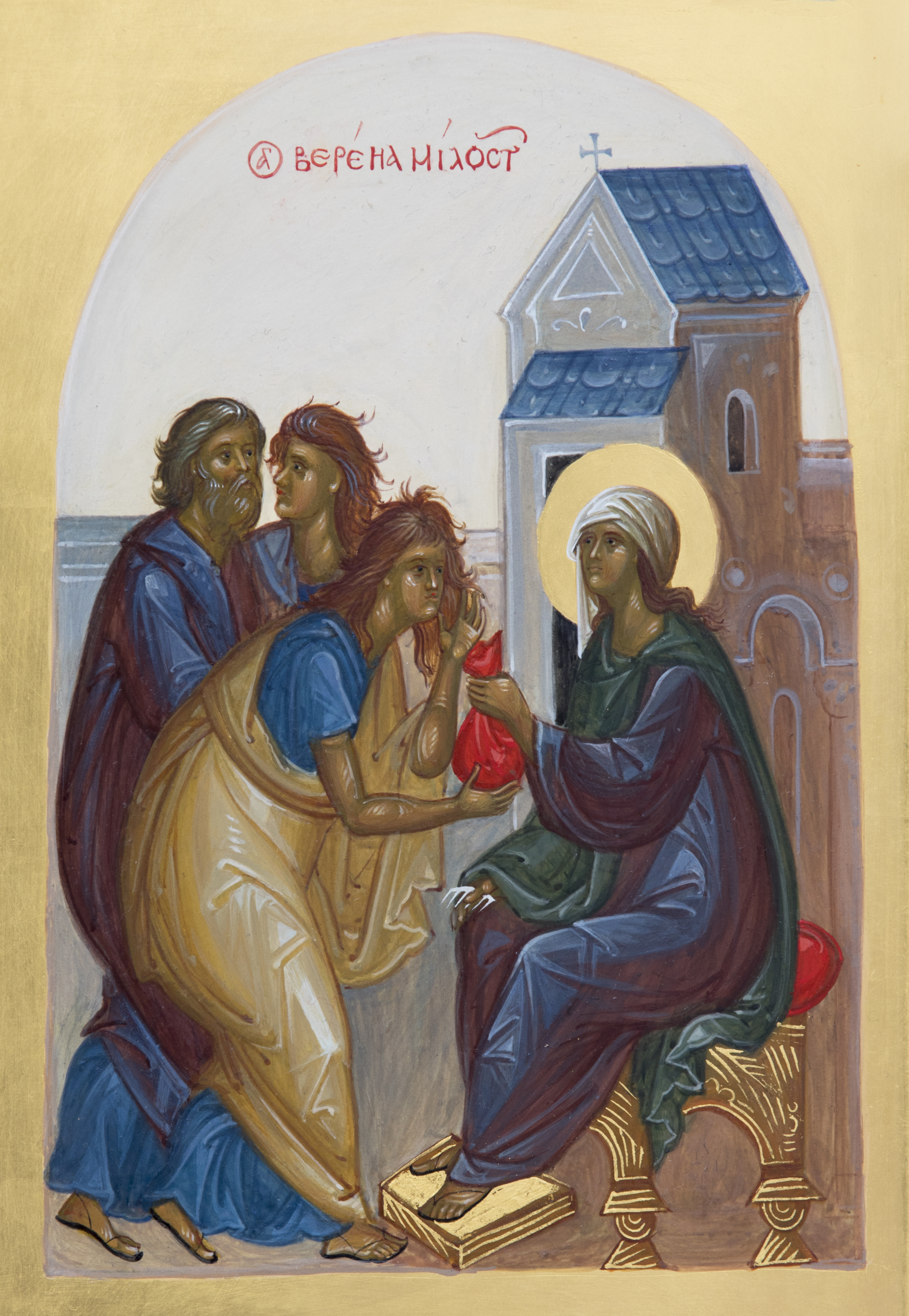
St. Verena of Zurzach.

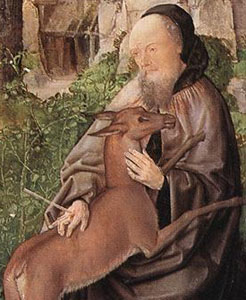
Saint Giles of Nîmes (Aegidius).
("Saint Giles and the Hind", circa 1500).

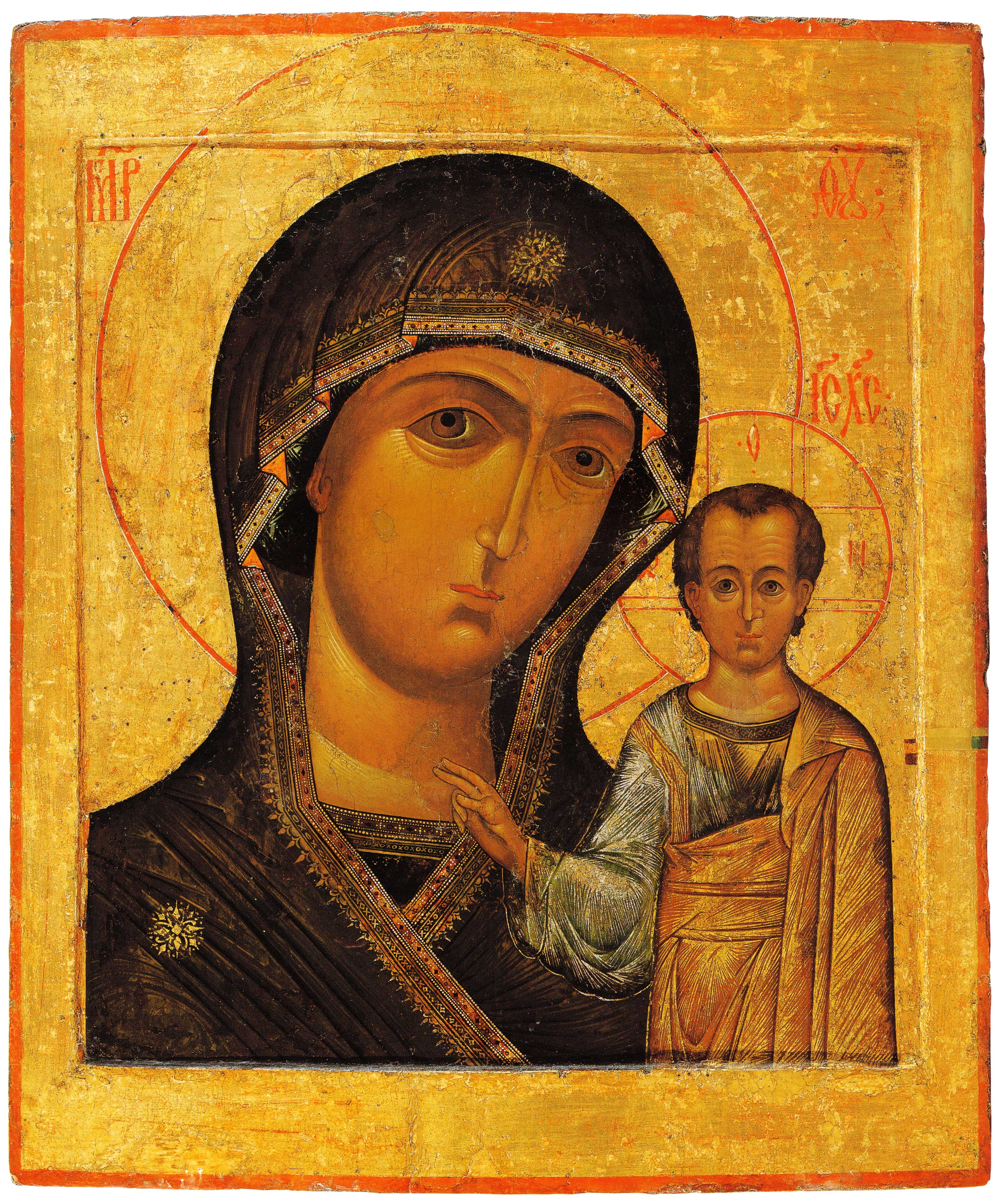
Icon of Our Lady of Kazan.

== Sources ==
- September 1/14. Orthodox Calendar (PRAVOSLAVIE.RU).
- September 14 / September 1. HOLY TRINITY RUSSIAN ORTHODOX CHURCH (A parish of the Patriarchate of Moscow).
- September 1. OCA - The Lives of the Saints.
- September 1. Latin Saints of the Orthodox Patriarchate of Rome.
- The Roman Martyrology. Transl. by the Archbishop of Baltimore. Last Edition, According to the Copy Printed at Rome in 1914. Revised Edition, with the Imprimatur of His Eminence Cardinal Gibbons. Baltimore: John Murphy Company, 1916. pp. 266–267.
- Rev. Richard Stanton. A Menology of England and Wales, or, Brief Memorials of the Ancient British and English Saints Arranged According to the Calendar, Together with the Martyrs of the 16th and 17th Centuries. London: Burns & Oates, 1892. p. 433.

Greek Sources

- Great Synaxaristes: (in Greek) 1 ΣΕΠΤΕΜΒΡΙΟΥ. ΜΕΓΑΣ ΣΥΝΑΞΑΡΙΣΤΗΣ.
- (in Greek) Συναξαριστής. 1 Σεπτεμβρίου. ECCLESIA.GR. (H ΕΚΚΛΗΣΙΑ ΤΗΣ ΕΛΛΑΔΟΣ).

Russian Sources

- (in Russian) 14 сентября (1 сентября). Православная Энциклопедия под редакцией Патриарха Московского и всея Руси Кирилла (электронная версия). (Orthodox Encyclopedia - Pravenc.ru).
- (in Russian) 1 сентября по старому стилю / 14 сентября по новому стилю. Русская Православная Церковь - Православный церковный календарь на 2026 год.
