= Christian Grube =

German choral conductor (born 1934)

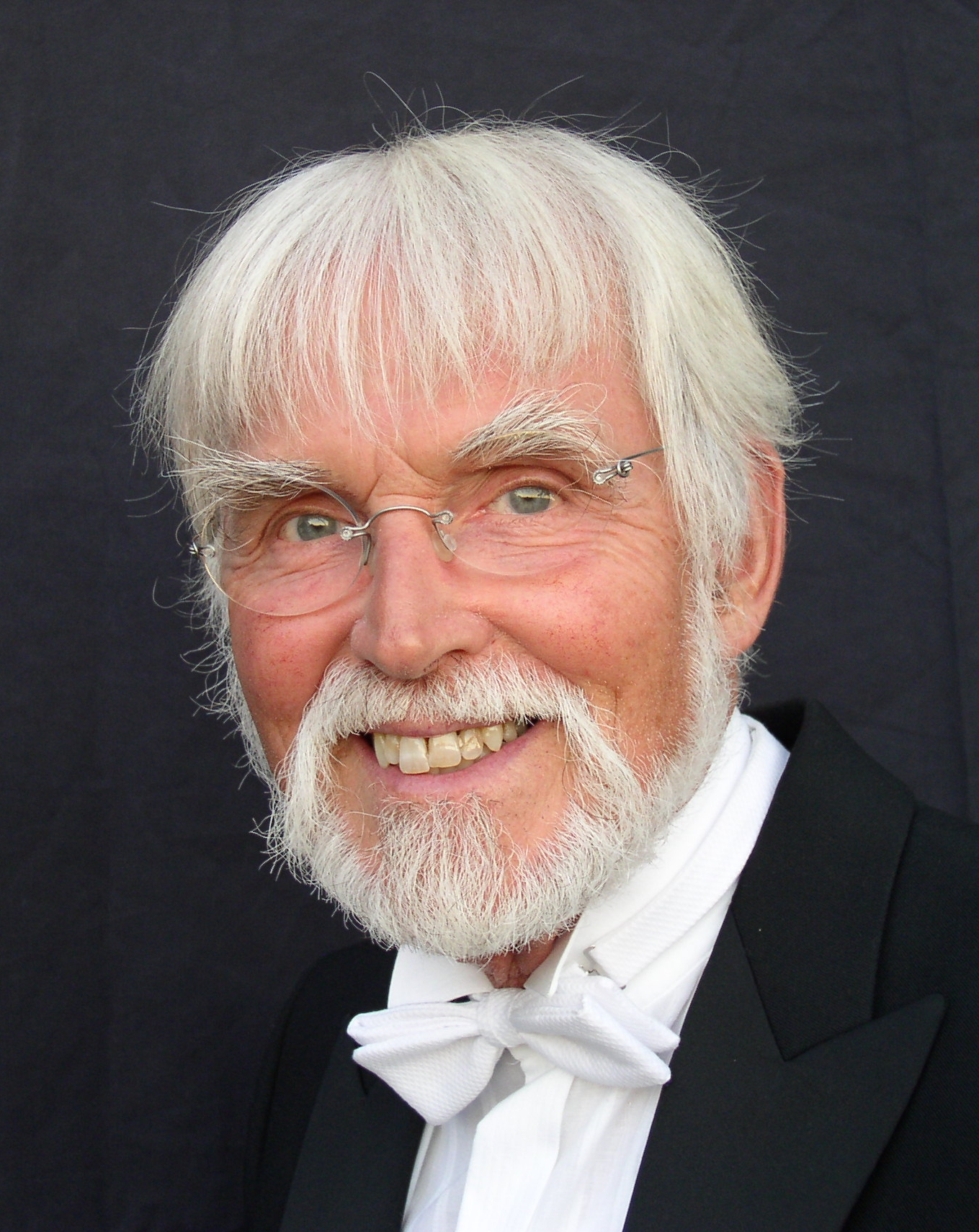
- Grube in 2004
- Born: 20 September 1934 (age 92); Hanover, Germany
- Education: Hochschule für Musik; Kirchenmusikschule
- Occupations: Kantor; Academic teacher
- Organizations: St. Michael's Church, Hildesheim; Berlin University of the Arts; Staats- und Domchor Berlin

Christian J Grube (born 20 September 1934) is a German choral conductor and academic teacher.

== Education ==
Christian Grube was born in Hanover on 20 September 1934. He studied at the Hochschule für Musik and at the Kirchenmusikschule in Hanover, majoring in conducting, voice, flute, organ, and Renaissance instruments. During his studies he became an experienced oratorio soloist, and also organized choral workshops in Germany and Switzerland.

== Career ==
In 1964 Grube was chosen for a new position at St. Michael's Church, Hildesheim. To recruit young singers for the Kantorei, the Lutheran Church of Hanover/Lower Saxony and the state of Lower Saxony linked the position of choirmaster (Kantor) at St. Michael’s with that of music teacher/choirmaster at the Gymnasium Andreanum. Grube held this dual position until 1973; his reputation there earned him an invitation to the Hochschule der Künste in Berlin.

In 1973 Grube became Professor for liturgy, hymnology, and choral conducting at the Berlin University of the Arts (formerly Hochschule der Künste), as well as director of the Staats- und Domchor Berlin. As its dual name suggests, the Staats- und Domchor was active both in government and church activities, singing regularly in the Kaiser-Wilhelm-Gedächtniskirche as the "bishop's choir", and also at official functions as the "state choir".

In 1975 Prof. Grube founded the Chamber Choir of the Berlin University of the Arts (Kammerchor der Universität der Künste).

Under his leadership, these two choirs frequently toured North and South America, the former Soviet Union, Egypt, Israel, Korea, Taiwan, and Africa, in addition to all of the European countries. These concert tours included lectures and workshops, as well as radio and television productions. His choirs have performed with Herbert von Karajan, Seiji Ozawa, Zubin Mehta, Riccardo Chailly, and Mauricio Kagel; with the Berlin Philharmonic Orchestra, the Deutsche Oper Berlin, the Berliner Ensemble, and the Komische Oper; with Dietrich Fischer-Dieskau, Edita Gruberová, and Thomas Quasthoff (who began his singing career in Grube's children's choir in Hildesheim).

Grube served as a jury member in German national choir competitions, as well as in Hungary, Poland, and in the California International Choral Festival and Competition in San Luis Obispo. He served as guest conductor and held choral workshops and conducting master classes in Sweden, Spain, Russia, Israel, Korea, and the United States.

In June 2006 he became Artistic Director and Conductor of the Santa Cruz Chorale in Santa Cruz, California.

As emeritus professor Christian Grube spends part of the year in Berlin, teaching conducting classes at the Berlin University of the Arts, and performing and touring with the university Chamber Choir. Every summer he holds conducting master classes and is a guest conductor in Granollers in Catalonia, Spain. As he has done for many years, he writes reviews of newly published music for Bärenreiter-Verlag. Grube spends part of each year in the mountains of Santa Cruz, California, where he conducts the Santa Cruz Chorale and gives private conducting lessons.

== Highlights ==
In 1989 the Staats- und Domchor was selected to sing at the German reunification ceremony . After the Berlin Wall came down, Grube was able to re-establish connections with the Dom in former East Berlin, thus making it possible for the choir to return to its original home.

Grube conducted the Staats- und Domchor in Maurice Jarre's music for the movie I Dreamed of Africa.

A generation of singers in German choirs studied with Grube or his students. His students have become conducting professors, music teachers, and opera singers in various countries (e.g.,

- Blanca Anabitarte,
- Christian Baehrens,

Eileen Chang,

- Kristian Commichau,

Josep Vila Jover,

- Jan Kobow, Frank Markowitsch,
- Siegfrid Pockern,

Michael Riedel,

- Ralf Sochaczewsky, and Matthias Stoffels).

Arvo Pärt dedicated his now well-known Magnificat to Grube and his boys' choir after they won the first prize in the German National Choral Competition.

== Awards ==
Because of the diplomatic influence of his work throughout the world, in 1995 Grube was awarded the National Medal for Distinguished Service — the highest civilian honor given by the German government.
