= Magnificat (Pärt) =

Musical piece composed by Arvo Pärt

- Choral music by Arvo Pärt
- Text: Magnificat
- Language: Latin
- Composed: 1989
- Dedication: Christian Grube and the Staats- und Domchor Berlin
- Performed: 24 May 1990: Stuttgart
- Scoring: SATB choir

Arvo Pärt set the Latin text of the Magnificat canticle in 1989. It is a composition for five-part choir (SSATB) a cappella, with several divided parts. Its performance time is approximately seven minutes. The composition is in tintinnabuli style, a style which Pärt had invented in the mid-1970s.

== Composition ==
=== Stylistic aspects ===
Tintinnabulation is the most important aspect of Pärt's Magnificat. According to Pärt's biographer and friend Paul Hillier, the Magnificat "displays the tintinnabuli technique at its most supple and refined." Pärt also uses drones; a second-line G in the alto near the end of the piece, as well as the third-space C (on which the soprano solo line always stays) which provides a tonal center for the piece. Hillier says that "many pieces [by Pärt] tend through length and repetition to establish a sense of timelessness or a continual present; the use of drones (which are in a sense a continuous repetition) reinforces this effect."

Arvo Pärt's wife Nora has said of his music,

The concept of tintinnabuli was born from a deeply rooted desire for an extremely reduced sound world which could not be measured, as it were, in kilometres, or even metres, but only in millimetres....By the end the listening attention is utterly focused. At the point after the music has faded away it is particularly remarkable to hear your breath, your heartbeat, the lighting or the air conditioning system, for example.

=== Structure ===
Structurally, the work can be divided into what Hillier refers to as "verse" and "tutti" sections. The verse sections include one voice (often a soprano solo) which remains constantly on third-space C, as well as a lower, melodic line. The tutti sections make use of either three, four, or six voice parts. The soprano soloist joins in the tutti sections at times. The progression of sections is:

Section style	Voices	Textual incipit
Verse	SS	Magnificat anima mea
Tutti	TTB	et exultavit
Verse	S solo, T	quia respexit
Tutti	STB	ecce enim
Verse	S solo, B	Quia fecit
Tutti	SSA	qui potens est
Tutti	SATB	et sanctum
Tutti	SSATTB	et misericordia
Verse	S solo, B	Fecit potentiam
Tutti	SSA	dispersit superbos
Verse	S solo, A drone, T	deposuit
Tutti	ATB	et exaltavit
Verse	SS	esurientes
Tutti	TTB	et divites
Tutti	S solo, SSATB	Suscepit Israel
Tutti	SSATTB	puerum suum
Verse	SS	recordatus
Tutti	SII drone, TTB	sicut locutus
Verse	S solo, SII drone, T	Abraham et semini
Tutti	SATBB	Magnificat anima mea
Tutti	S solo, SATBB	Dominum

=== Text setting ===
Setting text to music can be accomplished in many different ways. Hillier says that Pärt "works outwards from the structure of the text." In the tutti sections, "the number of syllables determines the notes to be used...the stressed syllable is alternately the pitch centre and, in the next word, the note furthest away from it." In verse sections, Pärt "seems to have allowed himself an unusual degree of freedom...the stressed syllables do frequently coincide with a change of melodic direction."

While the texture is mainly homophonic, a new rhythmic device is introduced when the choir sings "dispersit superbos". As if taking instruction from the text, the choir does, in fact, divide; while all voices begin the word together, only the melodic voice continues immediately onward. The other voices rest a beat before continuing with the second syllable.

== Performance guidelines ==
In his book Arvo Pärt, Paul Hillier provides helpful hints for performance of Pärt's works. He notes the difficulty of singing tintinnabular music smoothly, because the tintinnabular part is by its very nature never stepwise. He continues,

Another possible source of lumpiness arises from the frequent occurrence of longer notes in the middle of a phrase. (The Magnificat is full of such moments.) These longer notes can easily go 'dead' (so that you almost hear the singers counting), and then as the end of the note approaches there is a slight push as the voices lurch toward the next pitch

Hillier advises careful attention to tuning of pure intervals, as well as rehearsing the music extra slowly to understand the gravitas that must be expressed. He says, "It is perhaps no coincidence that I have borrowed these techniques from my experience with early music."

== Publication and recording ==
The score for Pärt's Magnificat is published by Universal Edition, Vienna, Austria. It is dedicated to Christian Grube and the Staats- und Domchor Berlin, who performed it for the first time in Stuttgart on 24 May 1990. It has been recorded by many groups, including the Estonian Philharmonic Chamber Choir under Tõnu Kaljuste; the Taverner Choir under Andrew Parrott; the Choir of King's College, Cambridge under Stephen Cleobury; and Theatre of Voices under Paul Hillier.
