= Missa de Beata Virgine =

Missa de Beata Virgine may refer to:

- The Missa de Beata Virgine (Josquin), by Josquin des Prez
- Missa de Beata Virgine, by Pierre de La Rue
- Missa de Beata Virgine, by Giovanni Pierluigi da Palestrina
- Missa de Beata Virgine, by Cristóbal de Morales
- Missa de Beata Virgine, by Antoine Brumel
- Missa de Beata Virgine, by Tomás Luis de Victoria
