= Theotokos of Buchyn =

Religious icon

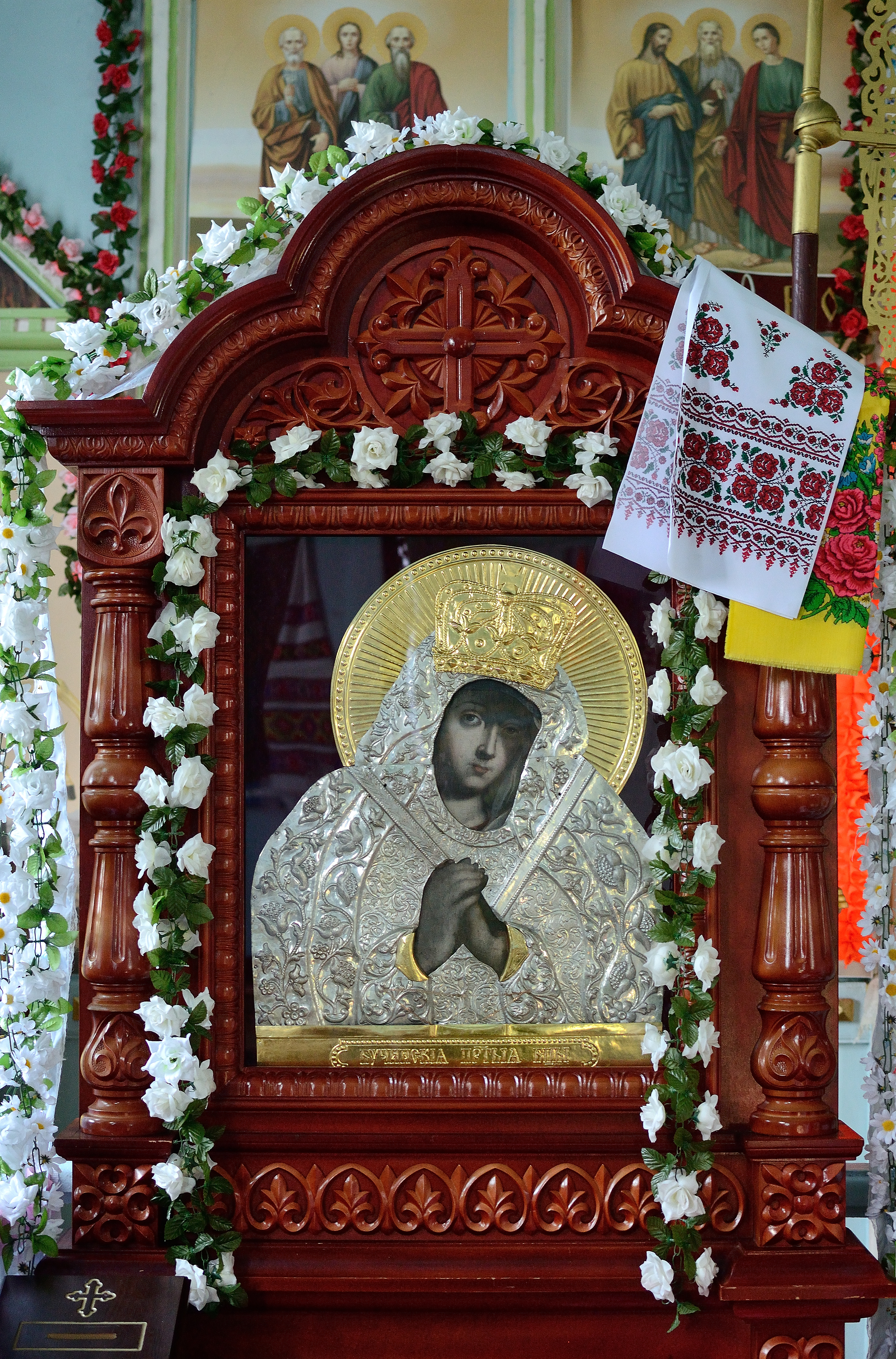
Icon of the Theotokos of Buchyn

The Theotokos of Buchyn is an icon which allegedly appeared in the 18th century and honored as miraculous by the Orthodox Christians of Volyn, Rivne (Ukraine), and Pinsk (Belarus) Polesye. The icon measures 65x80 cm.

It is worshipped in the St. Nicholas Church, Ukrainian Orthodox Church of the village of Buchyn in the Lyubeshiv district of Volyn oblast of Ukraine. A 15-kilometer long religious procession to the icon of Our Lady of Buchyn takes place annually on May 22, starting at the village of Zarudchi in the Lyubeshiv district.

The Blessed Virgin is depicted with her hands folded in prayer and soulful eyes.

== History ==
In the spring of 1706 on the island, among the floodplain of the river Stokhid, the villagers of Buchyn noticed an unusual light radiated by the miraculous Icon of the Holy Virgin.

Miraculous healing that began to occur in front of the image of Holy Mother, inspired inhabitants of Buchyn to build a chapel on the place of her landing and later a church.

During the First and Second World Wars the icon was secreted in hiding place amid impassable swamps.

Till 1793 the church in Buchyn belonged to the Russian Uniate Church – (today Ukrainian Greek Catholic Church).

Later, from 1794 to 1921, it was a part of the Minsk diocese of the Russian Orthodox Church, from 1922 to 1939 – to Polessie diocese of the Polish Orthodox Church, and from 1944 – to Volyn- Rivne Diocese of the Russian Orthodox Church . Since 1990 the church belongs to Volyn Eparchy of the Ukrainian Orthodox Church of the Moscow Patriarchate.

Among the priests who ministered near the icon of Theotokos of Buchyn were:

- Illarion Tsyrilkevych – from 1848 to 1863.
- Ihnatii Prushynskyi – from 1870 to 1875.
- Mykhailo Malevych – from 1876 to 1892.
- Foma Tumilovych – from 1892 to 1895.
- Oleksii Dankevych – from 1895 to 1900.
- Vasyl Oberman – from 1900 to 1915.
- Vasyl Byeloholovik (1893–1926) – from 1922 to 1926.
- Yevhen Kvacheniuk – from 1927 to 1930.
- Ioan Lozytskyi – from 1931 to 1933.
- Mykola Rozdialovskyi – from 1933 to 1935.

From 1961 to 1990, due to the termination of Divine Services in the Temple of Buchyn, Icon of the Theotokos witnessed numerous confessions and prayers of the faithful Christians in the church of Derevok village of the Lyubeshiv district. In 1990, the Icon of the Theotokos was returned to its honored place in the Temple of Buchyn village by the Procession.

Buchynska Theotokos was stolen from the church by robbers many times, but was returned every time. The last time it was in May 2007.

The icon of the Holy Virgin was being restored at the Museum of Volyn Icons in Lutsk from March till May, 2007 by the painter Anatolii Kvasiuk

The wooden church, filled with God's grace, float on the waves of Stokhid river for four centuries.

== God's blessing through Holy Virgin ==
1. Sisters Olga and Yevgenia, in 1995 in a letter addressed to the senior priest of the Buchyn's temple of that time, told the story about healing of their brother Vasyl. Sisters live in Pinsk now.

   "Once a time our mother took our brother Vasylko to the forest. He was one year old that time and he was just making his first steps to kick some bark for weaving. Vasyl began crying loudly and no one was able to calm him.  He had been staying in bed for two weeks, even when he was able to go by his own. Our mother was cried because of that grief every day.  Three years had passed since that accident, but he didn't begin to go. Once a time our inconsolable  mother saw an old man in slumber, who advised her to make the round of 9 yards, to ask wax, to make a candle  and take it to Buchyn icon of Mother of God. The women made everything  as the old man had ordered. Our mother tearfully asked Mother of God to help her. Vasylko was walking in the house, when the mother returned. All honour to our Queen of Heaven for her grace." 

2. The senior priest of Buchyn, Sergiy Kulchytskyi, recalled the memories about his life trial, which were written down by his daughter Valentyna. The Theotokos of Buchyn helped him to survive.

     Sergiy Kulchytskyi 1946 : «It was snowing after in 1938 years after the Protection Mother of God. I got up and went to feed cows at seven o'clock in the morning. While I was going back, my little son was running to me just in a nightshirt. I quickly leaned him up and went to the house. He had measles before it, but rash had passed away. Slavko caught terrible cold then. After a few days the temperature began to rise. We tried to help him at home, asked medical assistant, Demyan, for help, made cupping-glass and gave him milk with honey, but it didn't help. The temperature was 39, then 40 and 40,5. I went to the doctor in Lyubashiv. It was an old, experienced doctor, he was 76 years old. He dressed a warm  sheepskin coat and went with us. When the doctor inspected my so, examined his chest, nodded and said: «He has pneumonia-inflammation of the lungs with congestion. His state of the health is very dangerous, you should  hope for God.  I have done everything possible, have given him milk with honey to drink.»  The doctor explained us that Slavko had caught cold because of having measles before it. Slavko felt asleep and temperature began decrease, and it was 38 in the morning, he became cheerful and had a snack. Temperature was decreasing.  I felt something bad in my bones and invited deacon Nykon Naumovych and church warden Hnat  with his wife. At 5 oclock p.m. the temperature was 35. He was ill, his eyes were closed. At 9 p.m. the temperature was 35 and pulse was remiss.  I asked the deacon to check it, because I was very nervous and wasn't able to recognize it. The deacon didn't hear it, too. I wrapped up Slavko in my sheepskin coat, carried him but the breathing wasn't heard. I laid him down, his eyes were closed. Somebody said me to be quiet, because he was dying. I took a candle into his arms, the second one put near icons. I told my wife to go to the church and pray in front of Mother of God. I stayed near our son. She went to the church with church warden at midnight. Slavko had no features of life. It continued till 5 a.m. Suddenly I saw pulsating artery on his neck. He was alive. Nearly 6 o'clock he opened his eyes and whispered «father». We gave him some milk with honey, then some tea. Later, he had good appetite, put on weight and run till summer.»
