= Symeon Stylites of Lesbos =

Byzantine monk and pillar dweller

Saint Symeon the New Stylite
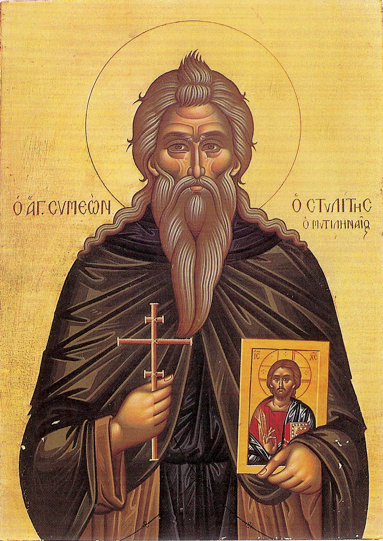
- Agios Symeon of Lesvos

Venerable
- Born: 765/766; Mytilene
- Died: 844
- Venerated in: Orthodox Church
- Feast: 1 February
- Attributes: pillar, monastic vestments

Saint Symeon Stylites of Lesbos (765/766–844) was a monk who survived two attempts on his life during the second period of Byzantine Iconoclasm (814–842). He followed a similar model to Simeon Stylites, residing on a pillar-like structure similar to a tower. There he isolated himself from the world and fasted, prayed and studied. In the Eastern Orthodox Church he is venerated as a saint, along with his two brothers: Saint George the Archbishop of Mytilene and Saint David the Monk.

== History ==
In the beginning of the eighth century in Mytilene lived Adrianos and Konstanto. They had seven children, of which five became monks; three of the children were David, George and Symeon. David, the eldest, was born around 717 or 718 A.D.; he learned how to read and write by 16 and he was the shepherd of his father's sheep. During the time of a huge storm, he saw a dream and Saint Anthony appeared to him and instructed him to travel to a monastery in Asia Minor, at Mount Ida. Exhibiting discipline at the mountain, he lived inside of a cave and ate wild greens. He lived there for 30 years. In another dream, he was instructed to go to the Bishop of Gargara to be ordained a deacon and later an Elder Priest. He later returned to the monastery in Mount Ida. He saw another dream and was instructed by an angel to build the church Saint Kirikou and Ioulittis and a monastery where many monks gathered.

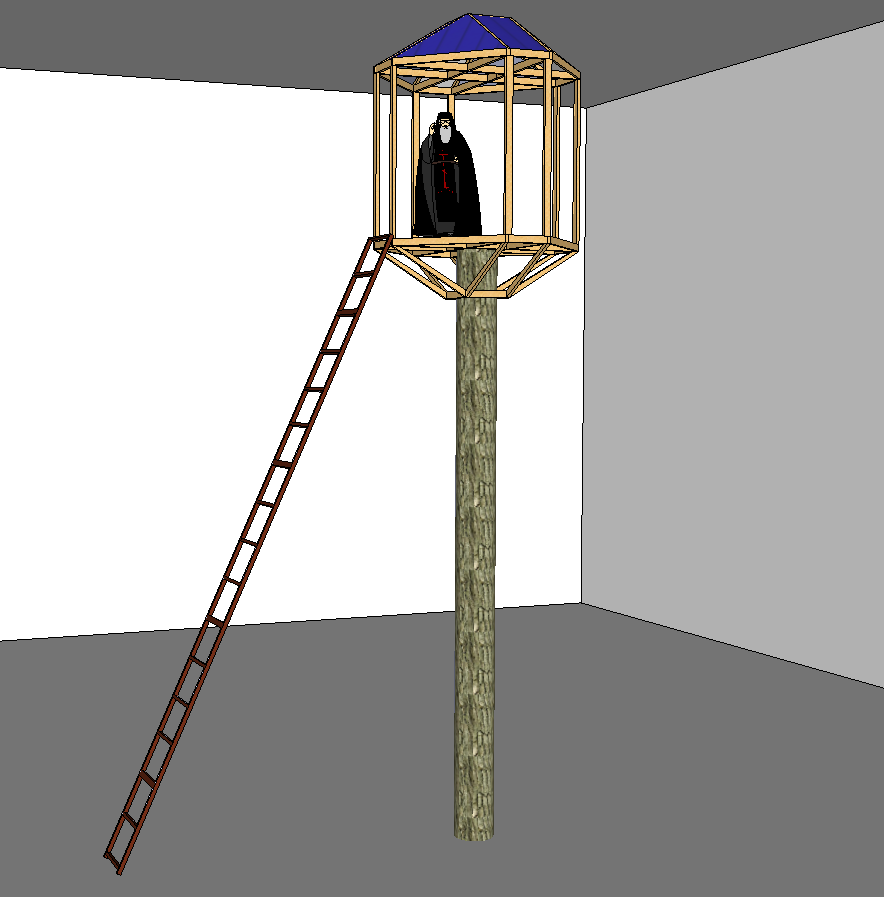
This is an example of a priest on a pillar

After ten years his mother arrived to inform him that his father had died. She was with his youngest brother Symeon who was 8 years old. He was born either in 765 or 766 A.D. Symeon lived with his brother; his mother returned to Mytilene and after a short time died. Symeon learned how to read and write living at his brother's monastery. Symeon at age 22 also became a monk at the monastery; by age 28 he was ordained. David saw a vision of his death in a dream and informed his younger brother to go back to Mytilene. Two years later David died at the age of 66. Symeon composed himself and on the command of his brother returned to Mytilene. He went to the church of Panagia which was at the north harbor of the island maybe Apano Skala. There he followed a similar model to Simeon Stylites. He climbed up a pillar-like structure similar to a tower. The term Stylite is Greek it comes from the word στυλί which means poll or column. There he isolated himself, fasted, worshiped and studied.

Symeon also at this point found his other brother George born 763 A.D. who was a monk and an ordained priest and their sister Illaria also a monk. Together with other priests, they built a huge monastery. The Monastery drew a huge amount of Christian worshipers who were thirsty to hear the Word of God. The worshipers were asking for the blessing of the holy monks.

On 19 April 797 Constantine VI was imprisoned, captured, and blinded by supporters of his mother. Irene of Athens organized a conspiracy. She was to be crowned as the first Empress regnant of Constantinople. She was exiled to Lesbos around 802. She was in favor of icons and was forced into poverty, spinning was her means of survival. One year later she died. The peace of the beautiful monastery was disrupted by the second iconoclast period: 814–842 instituted by Emperor Leo V the Armenian. The Emperor decreed persecution against Christians due to military failure the Byzantines suffered at the hands of Bulgarian Khan Krum. He wanted the same blessing that Constantine V had from the first iconoclast period: 730–787.

The bishop of Mytilene also named George, was exiled and a new bishop of Mytilene was chosen, he was loyal to Emperor Leo V the Armenian. He immediately began a campaign against the famed monks including Symeon and the monastery.

With the orders of the iconoclast Bishop, Symeon is ordered to be put to death by fire. With the aid of a miracle he is saved and he climbs his pillar where he stays for a period of time emulating Simeon Stylites. The angry bishop wishes Symeon to leave the city and never return. He is exiled to a small island with his monks called Saint Isidore. The area of the island of Lesbos was in the Gulf of Gera, close to Loutra near Kountouroudia.

Saint Symeon was again pursued by the iconoclast bishop because Emperor Michael II reissued orders against Symeon exiling him yet again to an uninhabited rock-like island across from Troy Lagousa. Symeon went there with 7 of his students. He again climbed the pillar and stayed for 10 days. His brother George stayed in Lesbos to watch over the Monastery.

Saint Symeon after a while traveled to Constantinople where he understood he would be extremely useful to the church. He settled at the Monastery of Medicium home of Saint Nikitas the Confessor near the city of Tirilye on the Sea of Marmara. With the Monastery of Medicium as his epicenter, he toured the Dardanelles to the Aegean Islands to the Black Sea. At these places, he would stand by the exiled priests hiding from the iconoclasts. At his time in exile, Symeon worked as a fisherman wherever he stopped, he worked to help the people in need more than helping himself. Touring the North Aegean and Asia Minor he not only taught but he also healed the sick and founded a female Monastery by the grace of God, where many nuns gathered.

Emperor of Byzantium Michael II died. His iconoclast successor Theophilos waged a bigger war against the church. Symeon and his entourage were arrested with the intent of imprisonment and being put to death. He was saved for a second time miraculously with the intervention of Theodora (wife of Theophilos). He was not lucky enough to escape 150 lashes which were ordered by the Emperor. He was then exiled to Aphousia an island in the Sea of Marmara. He was there with other distinguished priests of the Byzantium such as Theophanes the Branded and his brother Theodore the hymnographer. At this place of exile, Saint Symeon of Lesbos built a church in honor of the Virgin Mary and monastery where all the persecuted exiled iconoclast priests gathered.

Meanwhile, in Lesbos Symeon's brother George awaited his return but he also had serious problems with the iconoclasts during the time of Leo V the Armenian around 813–820. The iconoclast Bishop of the island pressured him with various methods until he exiled him from Mytilene. The bishop illegally seized the Monastery and sold all the family's belongings. George was forced to leave with his monks to a place on the island called Myrsina. Phountoules and Malamut identify Myrsinas with a site near the gulf of Gera in Lesbos where a monastery of Panagia Myrsiniotissa was constructed in the 12th century. But even at this location Christians came and found them and George taught and performed miracles.

When the Emperor Theophilos died, his wife Theodora rescinded the exile of all priests including George and his Brother Symeon. George and Symeon along with Methodios I of Constantinople the confessor became the most trusted advisors to Empress Theodora. Around 843 A.D. with the advice of Symeon, Methodios I became the Patriarch of Constantinople. Symeon with his students settled at the monastery then known as the Church of the Saints Sergius and Bacchus.

George was asked by Empress Theodora to become Bishop of Ephesus. He did not accept the position due to his old age. He was 80 years old at the time. After many attempts by Empress Theodora, he accepted to become the Bishop of the Metropolis Mytilene. Soon after he was ordained by the Empress, Empress Theodora, her brother Petronas and noble Bardas gave many gifts to the poor of the island. George entered the port with the royal navy accompanied by generals and members of Empress Theodora's court.

George was greeted with joy and happiness. The monks finally got back there monastery and they celebrated after being exiled for many years. Specifically, they celebrated the Birth of the Virgin Mary (8 September 843 A.D.). After several days George took his enthronement at the church of Saint Theodora, which was the Metropolitan Church on 14 of September during the Feast of the Cross.

One year later around 844 A.D., Saint Symeon Stylites of Lesbos died. He was buried at the Monastery of the Virgin Mary. The winter of the same year Saint George the Archbishop of Mytilene visited the land of the Goths to see a sick friend. With the Lord's help, Saint George's friend was healed. He envisioned a prophecy that he will die in seven years as he did. He returned to Mytilene and continued his work teaching and healing. He performed his miracles as the good Shepherd.

He went to Smyrna during the winter. There he wanted to see his spiritual children and monasteries, which he founded on plots his students gave him. At Smyrna, he stayed a few days because an angel came to him and announced his death was soon. He immediately returned to Mytilene where he survived the entire Great Lent he even performed the service of Holy Thursday. He understood the end was near. He gave his final commands to his spiritual children the monks and nuns. He gave his soul to the lord on the night of the Great Sabbath or Holy Saturday around 845 or 846 A.D. They buried him next to his brother Saint Symeon Stylites of Lesbos. The remains of the two saints were never discovered but are somewhere on the island of Lesbos. Saint David the Monk may be buried somewhere else. The three brothers are all Saints; Saint George the Archbishop of Mytilene, Saint Symeon Stylites of Lesbos and Saint David the Monk. Their joint Feast Day is celebrated in the Orthodox Church on February 1.

== Bibliography ==
- Talbot, Alice-Mary (1998). Byzantine Defenders of Images: Eight Saints' Lives in English Translation. Dumbarton Oaks. p. 143. ISBN 978-0884022596.
- McCormick, Michael (2002). Origins of the European Economy: Communications and Commerce and Commerce AD 300-900. Cambridge University Press. p. 423. ISBN 9780521661027.
