= Theotokos of Miasena =

Religious icon

The Theotokos of Miasena or the Theotokos of the Azour is an icon of Mary which is thought to have been involved in a number of miraculous events. These events include the rediscovery of the icon unharmed over 100 years after it is supposed to have been thrown into a pond.

There are no extant accounts as to how this icon first appeared at the monastery of the Theotokos at Miasena, near the city of Melitene, Little Armenia. The monastery was founded by St. Acacius of Melitene in the 5th century. It is known that the icon is linked to several miracles which have been linked to its presence there.

Accounts to how it disappeared differ. Some sources say that the icon was cast into the water (either the pond of Ghazour near the monastery or Lake Zagura) because the local population feared that the icon would be destroyed by the iconoclast Leo III the Isaurian. Other accounts indicate that it was cast in the water by the iconoclasts specifically to be destroyed.

Roughly one hundred years later, Michael III restored the veneration of icons. Toward the end of his reign, on September 1, 864, the icon is said to have been rediscovered after having risen to the surface of the lake it had earlier been cast into, completely unharmed. The icon was restored to the monastery of Miasena.

This incident is commemorated in the calendar of the Eastern Orthodox Church as the Synaxis of the Most Holy Theotokos in Miasena Monastery on September 1. On this feast, people pray for Mary's special protection and guidance.
