= Pre-Tridentine Mass =

Forms of the Mass before 1570

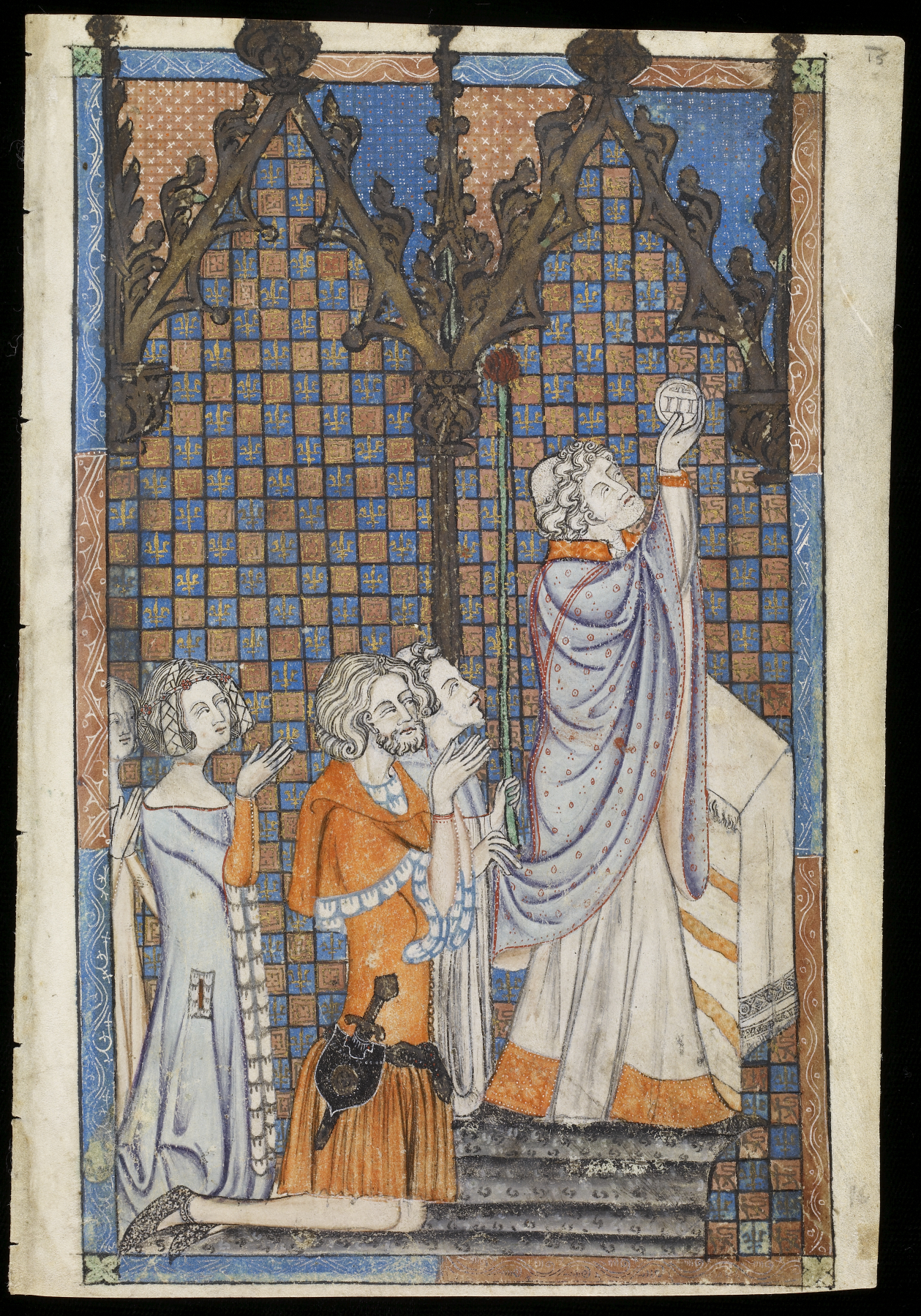
Mass from English Book of Hours (c. 1300-1400)

Pre-Tridentine Mass refers to the evolving and regional forms of the Catholic Mass in the West from antiquity to 1570. The basic structure solidified early and has been preserved, as well as important prayers such as the Roman Canon.

Following the Council of Trent's desire for standardization, Pope Pius V, with his bull Quo primum, made the Roman Missal obligatory throughout the Latin Church, except for those places and congregations whose distinct rites could demonstrate an antiquity of two hundred years or more.

In the 1500s, the Pre-Tridentine Roman Rite became the basis for the Evangelical-Lutheran Rite of the Mass.

== Development ==
=== Earliest accounts ===
2nd-century description of the Eucharist

And this food is called among us Eukharistia [the Eucharist], of which no one is allowed to partake but the man who believes that the things which we teach are true, and who has been washed with the washing that is for the remission of sins, and unto regeneration, and who is so living as Christ has enjoined. For not as common bread and common drink do we receive these; but in like manner as Jesus Christ our Savior, having been made flesh by the Word of God, had both flesh and blood for our salvation, so likewise have we been taught that the food which is blessed by the prayer of His word, and from which our blood and flesh by transmutation are nourished, is the flesh and blood of that Jesus who was made flesh.

— Justin Martyr (First Apology 66:1–20 [AD 148])

A surviving account of the celebration of the Eucharist or the Mass in Rome is that of Saint Justin Martyr (died c. 165), in chapter 67 of his First Apology:

On the day called Sunday, all who live in cities or in the country gather together to one place, and the memoirs of the apostles or the writings of the prophets are read, as long as time permits; then, when the reader has ceased, the president verbally instructs, and exhorts to the imitation of these good things. Then we all rise together and pray, and, as we before said, when our prayer is ended, bread and wine and water are brought, and the president in like manner offers prayers and thanksgivings, according to his ability, and the people assent, saying Amen; and there is a distribution to each, and a participation of that over which thanks have been given, and to those who are absent a portion is sent by the deacons.

In chapter 65, Justin Martyr says that the kiss of peace was given before the bread and the wine mixed with water were brought to "the president of the brethren". The initial liturgical language used was Greek, before approximately the year 190 under Pope Victor I, when the Church in Rome changed from Greek to Latin, except in particular for the Hebrew word "Amen", whose meaning Justin explains in Greek (γένοιτο), saying that by it "all the people present express their assent" when the president of the brethren "has concluded the prayers and thanksgivings".

According to some scholars, the early Christian liturgy was a continuation of the liturgy of contemporary Jewish synagogues (as distinct from the temple liturgy): Catholic historian Louis Duschesne commented "the only permanent element, on the whole, which Christianity added to the liturgy of the synagogue was [...] the sacred meal instituted by Jesus Christ as a perpetual commemoration of himself." This tradition included unaccompanied psalms, cantillation (half-way between recitation and singing), and chant. According to Catholic historian Mark Kirby "By the fourth century, the fully sung liturgy, with its roots in Semitic chant, had become normative in both East and West. According to Orthodox historian Alexander Schmemann every word pronounced in church had a "singing quality": the "entire service, which was thought of in all its parts as a singing of praise to God." This sung liturgy was held to be an imitation of, participation in, and foretaste of the divine liturgy. Congregations could sing responses to versicles, antiphons and hymns.

=== Early changes ===
It is unclear when the language of the celebration finished changing from Greek to Latin. Pope Victor I (190–202) may have been the first to use Latin in the liturgy in Rome. Others think Latin was finally adopted nearly a century later. (Note: "The complete and definitive Latinization of the Roman liturgy seems to have happened toward the middle of the fourth century." Mohrmann, Christine (1961–77), Études sur le latin des chrétiens [Studies on the Latin of the Christian], vol. I, Rome: Edizioni di Storia e Letteratura, p. 54) The change was probably gradual, with both languages being used for a while. (Note: "The first Christians in Rome were chiefly people who came from the East and spoke Greek. The founding of Constantinople naturally drew such people thither rather than to Rome, and then Christianity at Rome began to spread among the Roman population, so that at last the bulk of the Christian population in Rome spoke Latin. Hence the change in the language of the liturgy. [...] The liturgy was said (in Latin) first in one church and then in more, until the Greek liturgy was driven out, and the clergy ceased to know Greek. About 415 or 420 we find a Pope saying that he is unable to answer a letter from some Eastern bishops, because he has no one who could write Greek." Plummer, Alfred (1985), Boudens, Robrecht (ed.), Conversations with Dr. Döllinger 1870–1890, Leuven University Press, p. 13.)

With regard to the Roman Canon of the Mass, the prayers beginning Te igitur, Memento Domine and Quam oblationem were already in use, even if not with quite the same wording as now, by the year 400; the Communicantes, the Hanc igitur, and the post-consecration Memento etiam and Nobis quoque were added in the fifth century.

Jerome heard the long, melismatic sung Alleluia in Bethlehem and it was gradually introduced in the Western liturgy. The Agnus Dei chant seems to have been instituted by Pope Sergius I (687–701), and the Credo chant sporadically from 800 AD.

=== Early Middle Ages ===
Before the pontificate of Pope Gregory I (590–604), the Roman Mass rite underwent many changes, including a "complete recasting of the Canon" (a term that in this context means the Anaphora or Eucharistic Prayer). (Note: "...the Eucharistic prayer was fundamentally changed and recast" "Liturgy of the Mass", Catholic Encyclopedia, New advent.) At the time of Gregory I, regional customisation of liturgies were encouraged in missionary areas: according to Bede Gregory instructed Augustine of Canterbury to select "any customs in the Roman or the Gaulish Church or any other Church which may be more pleasing to Almighty God", and to teach them to the church of the English.

In Gaul, the Merovingian period (~500–750) has been called "the experimental age of liturgy," with the propers constructed freely: according to historian Yitzhak Hen "each bishop, abbot or priest was free to choose the prayers he found suitable." Cross-pollination and recycling of liturgical prayers was common, as priests and bishops took sacramentaries (manuscripts of liturgical prayers) between regions, and new prayers were composed.

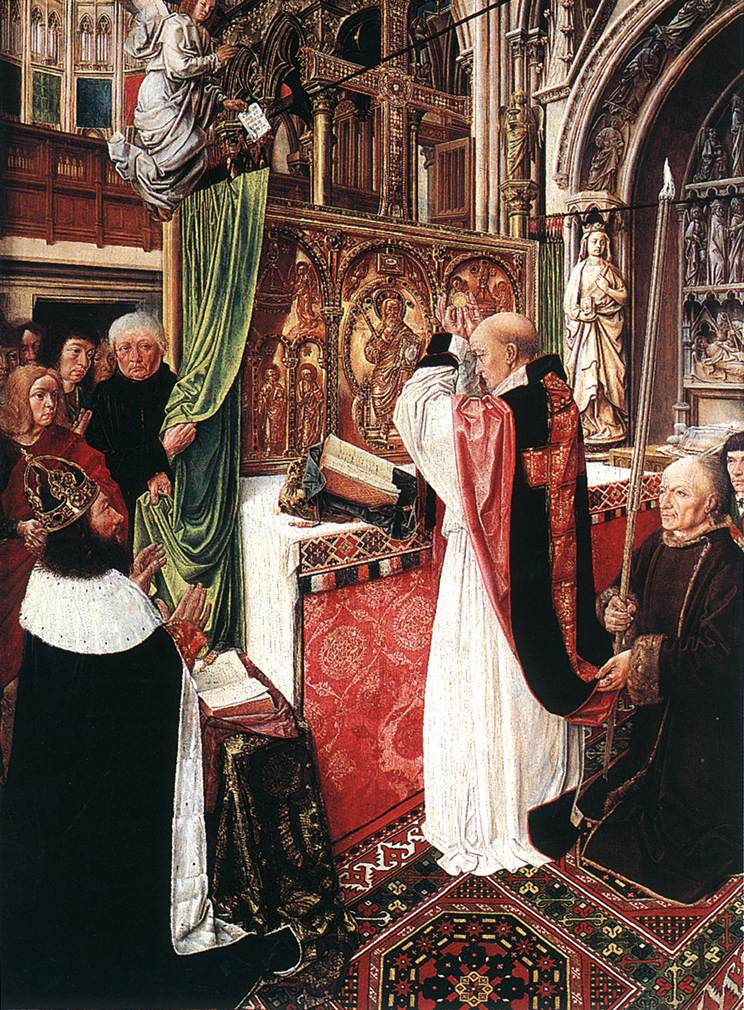
Mass with St. Gilles and Charlemagne (c. 1500)

In the eighth century the Merovingian dynasty had been replaced by the Carolingians in Frankish Gaul. In the late eighth century, Pepin the Short ordered the Roman chant be used throughout his domains. However, some elements of the preceding Gallican rites were fused with it north of the Alps, and the resulting mixed rite was introduced into Rome under the influence of the emperors who succeeded Charlemagne. Gallican influence is responsible for the introduction into the Roman rite of dramatic and symbolic ceremonies such as the blessing of candles, ashes, palms, and much of the Holy Week ritual. The chant style that mixed Gallican and old Roman chant styles became known as Gregorian chant.

During the Carolingian period, the language diverged with Latin going back to its classical forms and the vernacular recognized as separate tongues. Consequently, the Council of Tours (813) mandated that sermons be given in the Romance or Teutonic vernacular.

The chants and musical settings of the Mass were divided into:

- the parts that do not change during the year (the Ordinary: the Kyrie, Gloria, Credo, Sanctus, and Agnus Dei), and;
- the parts that belonged to the particular day and occasion (the Proper): Introit, Gradual, Alleluia, Offertory, Communion.

The major difference between the various rites or uses was not the basic structure or components of the ordinary parts of the liturgy, but of different arrangements, selection and allocation of prayers on different days, as well as mention of regionally-popular saints, and different rubrics.

=== Late Middle Ages ===
Towards the end of the first millennium, organ, previously a secular instrument, was introduced as did more complicated singing of components of the Mass by choirs. Important liturgies might be preceded, followed or interrupted by elaborate processions with songs, dramatic rituals involving props, and acted plays or tableau, with the laity trained to understand the symbolism. In several locations, the story of the Three Magi would be enacted by three costumed men who would follow a star through the church, search at various locations, until finding the altar, while singing the Gospel alternatively and polyphonically.

The recitation of the Credo (Nicene Creed) after the Gospel is attributed to the influence of Emperor Henry II. Gallican influence explains the practice of incensing persons, introduced in the 11th or 12th century; "before that time incense was burned only during processions (the entrance and Gospel procession)".

Private prayers for the priest to say before Communion were another novelty to Rome. From the 9th century, the Ordo Missae texts — which appeared as part of missals as well as priestly handbooks or prayer books — flourished in variety and content, particularly in the Frankish Kingdom and along the Rhine. Going beyond earlier types of liturgical writing, they incorporated ritual instructions and private prayers for the celebrant to recite as an aid to the devout offering of sacrifice. These private prayers distinctively included prayers directly addressed to Christ and direct invocations of the Holy Trinity (such as during the Offertory) — Gallican responses against Arianism among Germanic peoples. The prayers also reflected a Frankish tendency to verbalise non-verbal gestures. By the reign of Gregory VII, such Rhenish elements had become integral to the rite of the Pope and the Papal Curia, at the same time that the Roman Church began encouraging liturgical unity across Western Christendom. These prayers varied considerably until standardized by Pope Pius V in 1570. The rites had some differences in the prayers on the boundaries of the Mass: Pre-Tridentine prayers said mostly in the sacristy or during the procession to the altar as part of the priest's preparation were formalized in the 1570 missal of Pope Pius V as the Prayers at the Foot of the Altar; prayers that followed the Ite missa est changed or changed position (for example, in the 1570 edition, the Canticle of the Three Young Men and Psalm 150 in Pius V's edition the priest was to say while leaving the altar were later omitted).

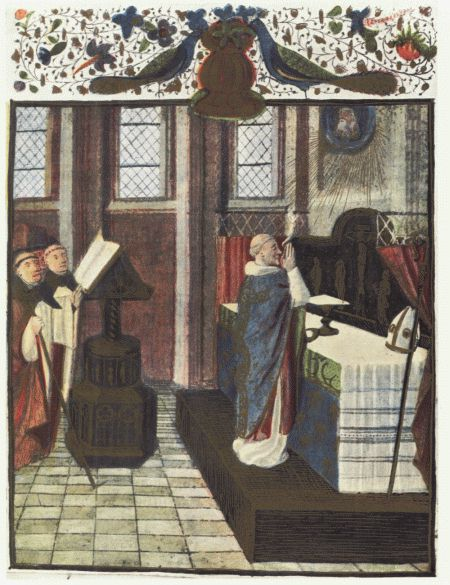
A Pontifical Sung Mass at the close of the Middle Ages or early Renaissance (15th century)

The historical record of liturgical practice, especially for smaller churches, is highly incomplete in much of Europe: historian Matthew Cheung Salisbury estimates that only 1 in 1,000 English liturgical manuscripts survived the iconoclastic English Reformation, with similar destruction at the French Revolution.

=== Renaissance and Reformation ===
Between 1478 and 1501, the bishops of 52 dioceses, including the primates of France, Castile, England, the Holy Roman Empire and Poland each independently published, in print, official liturgical texts for their diocese, because of the extent of parish and monastery variation. (Note: At least 107 of these still exist: regions also included modern Hungary, Sweden, Switzerland and even two dioceses in the Kingdom of Naples. Furthermore, at least 490 editions were made by private publishers before 1501 for clergy. Nowakowska, N. (1 November 2011). "From Strassburg to Trent: Bishops, Printing and Liturgical Reform in the Fifteenth Century*". Past & Present (213): 3–39. doi:10.1093/pastj/gtr012.)

From 1474 until Pope Pius V's 1570 text, there were at least 14 different printed editions that purported to present the text of the Mass as celebrated in Rome, rather than elsewhere, and which therefore were published under the title of "Roman Missal" (Latin: Missale romanum.) These were produced in Milan, Venice, Paris and Lyon. Even these show variations. Local Missals, such as the Parisian Missal, of which at least 16 printed editions appeared between 1481 and 1738, showed more important differences. The Milanese Roman Missal of 1474, which reproduces the Papal Chapel missal of the late 1200s, "hardly differs at all" from the initial Tridentine missal promulgated in 1570, apart from local feasts.

In the 1500s, the Pre-Tridentine Roman Rite became the basis for the Western Evangelical-Lutheran Rite of the Mass. With respect to its similarity with the Tridentine Rite, Jesuit priest Rune P. Thuringer, writing in 1965, noted that "The eucharistic liturgy of the state Church of Sweden, which is Lutheran, is closer in many respects to the rite of the Roman Mass than that of any other Protestant church."

=== Other rites ===
With the exception of the relatively few places where no form of the Roman Rite had ever been adopted, the core Canon of the Mass remained generally uniform, but the prayers in the Ordo Missae, and still more the Proprium Sanctorum and the Proprium de Tempore, varied widely.

Even areas that had accepted the Roman Rite had introduced changes and additions. As a result, every ecclesiastical province and almost every diocese had its local use.

=== Languages ===
In most Christian countries, the language used for celebrating pre-Tridentine Masses was Latin, which had become the language of the Roman liturgy in the late 4th century. (As Latin receded, non-liturgical sections, such as sermons for the general populace and bidding prayers were typically preached in the vernacular, and included translations of the readings.) (Note: "The established view that popular sermons were written down in Latin and preached in the vernacular [...] may be reaffirmed as a broad generalization" Pelle, Stephen (1 September 2017). "Updating Ælfric's Homilies around the Year 1200". The Review of English Studies. 68 (286): 650–665. doi:10.1093/res/hgx014.)

However, there have been exceptions:

- In Dalmatia and parts of Istria in Croatia, the Roman Rite liturgy was celebrated in Old Church Slavonic from the time of Cyril and Methodius, and authorization for use of this language was extended to some other Slavic regions between 1886 and 1935. (Note: "The right to use the Glagolitic [sic] language at Mass with the Roman Rite has prevailed for many centuries in all the south-western Balkan countries, and has been sanctioned by long practice and by many popes." Krmpotic, M.D. (1908). "Dalmatia". Catholic encyclopedia.) (Note: "In 1886 it arrived to the Principality of Montenegro, followed by the Kingdom of Serbia in 1914, and the Republic of Czechoslovakia in 1920, but only for feast days of the main patron saints. The 1935 concordat with the Kingdom of Yugoslavia anticipated the introduction of the Slavic liturgy for all Croatian regions and throughout the entire state." Japundžić, Marko (1997). "The Croatian Glagolitic Heritage". Croatian Academy of America.)
- In the 14th century, Dominican missionaries converted a monastery near Qrna, Armenia to Catholicism, and translated the liturgical books of the Dominican Rite, a variant of the Roman Rite, into Armenian for the community's use. The monks were deterred from becoming members of the Dominican Order itself by the severe fasting requirements of the Dominican Constitutions, as well as the prohibition on owning any land other than that on which the monastery stood, and therefore became the Order of the United Friars of St. Gregory the Illuminator, a new order confirmed by Pope Innocent VI in 1356 whose Constitutions were similar to the Dominicans' except for these two laws. This order established monasteries over a vast amount of territory in Greater and Lesser Armenia, Persia, and Georgia, using the Dominican Rite in Armenian until the end of the order's existence in 1794.
- On February 25, 1398, Pope Boniface IX also authorized Maximus Chrysoberges to found a monastery in Greece where Mass would be celebrated in Greek according to the Dominican Rite, and Manuel Chrysoloras translated the Dominican missal into Greek in pursuance of the plan, but nothing further is known of this undertaking.

At various times there were calls for the prayers of the Mass to be in the vernacular, such as by Erasmus.

There may have sometimes been more flexibility in other liturgies than the Mass: in the mid-1400s, when the Congregation of Windesheim moved to the Rule of St Augustine, the fairly new convent Jerusalem in Venray was granted by their bishop to say the new liturgy in the vernacular, until they had mastered the Latin.

=== Legacy ===
The pre-Tridentine Mass survived post-Trent in some Anglican and Lutheran areas with some local modification from the basic Roman rite until the time when worship switched to the vernacular. Dates of switching to the vernacular, in whole or in part, varied widely by location. In some Lutheran areas this took three hundred years, as choral liturgies were sung by schoolchildren who were learning Latin.

== Vernacular and laity in the medieval and Reformation eras ==
Historian Virginia Reinburg has noted that the medieval Eucharistic liturgy as experienced by (French) lay people, and shown in their prayer books, was a distinct experience from that of the clergy and the clerical missal.

What the lay prayer books reveal—and missals do not—is the pre-Reformation mass as a ritual drama in which the priests and the congregation had distinct, but equally necessary parts to play.

— Virginia Reinburg

=== Setting ===
In the Carolingian period, the Mass was increasingly performed as sacred drama, with the people as active participants not passive spectators: Archbishop Amalarius of Metz (c. 830) was accused of imparting "theatrical elements and stage mannerisms" to the Frankish liturgy.

The medieval lay experience was often highly sensory: churches featured chanting and singing, bells, highly technical organs, incense, busy paintings, brilliant robes, rare colours, shiny utensils, clouds of saints and angels, and stained-glass light. (Note: There is an obscure report of an improvised pre-medieval practise of a bishop to whack penitants with his pallium in proportion to their sins. Murray, Alexander (1993). "Confession before 1215". Transactions of the Royal Historical Society. 3: 51–81. doi:10.2307/3679136. ISSN 0080-4401. JSTOR 3679136.) Some larger churches even had articulated puppet/statues to delight and inspire the congregation.

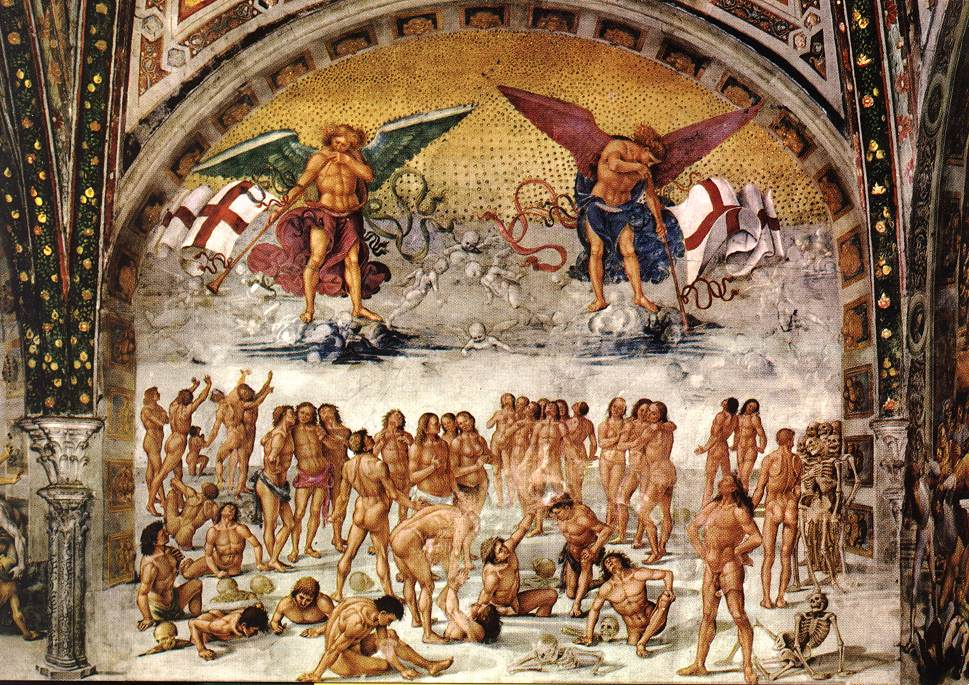
Resurrection of the Flesh (1499–1502) Fresco Chapel of San Brizio, Duomo, Orvieto.

By the Renaissance, churches were full of depictions in art of biblical and hagiographical people and events to illustrate notable days in the church calendar; cathedrals could have artwork on a monumental scale: for example Luca Signorelli and Fra Angelico's frescoes in Orvieto Cathedral are based around the liturgy for the Feast of All Saints. In Northern Europe, such art rarely survived the iconoclasm of the Protestant Reformation.

=== Lay experience ===
The priests and deacons attended to the ceremony in the chancel or side altar:

For the priest, the most important important parts of the mass would be scripture readings, offertory of bread and wine, consecration, and priest's communion.

— Virginia Reinburg

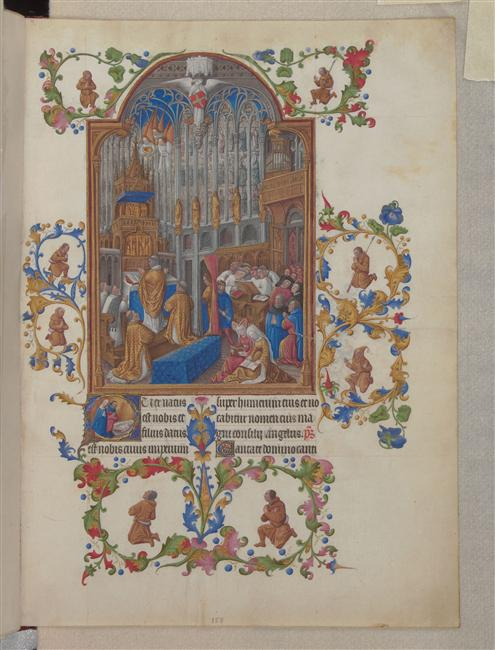
Duke of Berry Christmas Mass (c. 1485–1486)

The laity enjoyed the ceremony from the nave:

For the lay congregation, however, the mass was a series of collective devotions and ritual actions; the most important elements would be the Gospel, prône ("bidding prayers", see below), offertory procession, and distribution of the pain bénit at the end of the mass. [...] The laity's mass was less sacrifice and sacrament than a communal rite of greeting, sharing, giving, receiving and making peace." (Note: "The central contention of [John] Bossy's [...] Christianity in the West was that medieval Christianity had been fundamentally concerned with the creation and maintenance of peace in a violent world. "Christianity" in medieval Europe denoted neither an ideology nor an institution, but a community of believers whose religious ideal—constantly aspired to if seldom attained—was peace and mutual love. The sacraments and sacramentals of the medieval Church were not half-pagan magic, but instruments of the "social miracle," rituals designed to defuse hostility and create extended networks of fraternity, spiritual "kith and kin," by reconciling enemies and consolidating the community in charity."Duffy, Eamon (1 November 2016). "The End of Christendom". First Things.)

— Virginia Reinburg

Lay prayer-books, for the educated middle and upper classes, not only gave the communal actions of the liturgy, but provided almost an unofficial parallel liturgy of silent prayers and devotions for the laity to perform in between and in preparation for the actions.

For the congregation, which would not have heard the sacred words "This is my body", the elevation was the emotional climax of the mass. It was also the focus of popular liturgical devotion. Virtually no lay books actually explain the consecration [...] [or] the doctrine of transubstantiation. [...] Yet the ritual of the elevation was intended to express the real presence of Christ on the altar.

— Virginia Reinburg

Notable parts of the lay experience of the liturgy (especially the Sunday Mass) included:

- The reading of the Gospel could be an elaborate and reverential event, with all people standing and genuflecting at any (Latin) mention of the name Jesus. Erasmus mentioned approvingly that in his day it was the practice, after the reading, for the sumptuous evangeliary (Gospel book) to be carried around the people and kissed by all in adoration.
- The Prône (French: Prières du Prône, German: Pronaus, Latin: pronaüm) mentioned above was a vernacular service that came to be included as a para-liturgy in medieval Latin High Masses (typically at the Sermon), dating back at least to Regino of Prüm (d. 915). It was named after the screen at the chancel entrance, where the priest would speak in the local language. It could include well-known prayers, translations of the Gospel and Epistle, the homily nominally on the Gospel, catechetical instruction, comprehensive prayers for the living and the dead, (Note: Corresponding to the Anglo-Saxon/Anglo-Norman/Middle English "bidding the beads" Rock, Daniel (1849). The Church of Our Fathers as Seen in St. Osmund's Rite for the Cathedral of Salisbury: With Dissertations on the Belief and Ritual in England Before and After the Coming of the Normans. C. Dolman.) acknowledging benefactors, open confession (for venial sins), teaching the diocese's domestic morning prayer, announcements including weddings, upcoming fasts and feasts, village assembly meetings, royal or seigneurial decrees of note, and salutory crime reports. It was regarded as vital by laypeople even into the post-Reformation period.
  It was universally folded into the Sunday Mass by the Council of Trent and with collated bidding prayers such as Peter Canisius' German: Allgemeines Gebet. (In Ireland (c. 1785), "the prône" became the name for a book of prepared sermons and prayers which were "a key tool in remodelling older oral versions of the (vernacular portion of the) liturgy to newer standardised ones.")
- Preaching: Written and spoken Latin had diverged enough that by 813 the Council of Tours instructed that homilies should be given in the local spoken vernacular, whether Romance or Teutonic. It was the common practice (Note: See, for example, the Middle English Old Kentish Sermons (c. 12th century) in Morris, Richard (2006). An Old English miscellany containing a bestiary, Kentish sermons, Proverbs of Alfred, religious poems of the thirteenth century.) that at the beginning of the vernacular homily (sermon), (Note: "preaching in the vernacular, at least to the common people, was the norm [...] Preaching in Latin was probably the norm only for a more learned audience, such a monastic or university community. A considerable group of sermons, the so-called macaronic sermons, mix both languages, and some scholars even have suggested that bilingual preaching was a common practice. It certainly seems to have been common practice to cite Scripture first in Latin, before translating it into the vernacular, even in vernacular sermons.") the Gospel reading and perhaps the Epistle reading would be rendered loosely in the vernacular by the priest. In a pinch, this translation could be used as the sermon itself: inability or slackness to preach in the vernacular was repeatedly regarded as a failure of a parish priest's or bishop's duty, (Note: This concern mirrors that of Charlemagne who, in 769, had ordered each priest every Lent to "report and explain to the bishop the method and procedure [in which he performs] his ministry, concerning baptism, the Catholic faith, the prayers, and the ordo of the Mass. [...] Priests, who do not know properly [how] to perform their ministry and are not too busy to learn with all their energy according to the order of their bishops, or [those who] seem to disregard the canons, must be removed from the office itself, until they should know these completely without any mistakes.") as it was a requirement of canon law that parish priests should know the scriptures. (Note: Gratian, Decretum, D XXXVIII C.1: "Priests must, above all, avoid ignorance. ... For priests are admonished to read the Holy Scriptures, as the Apostle Paul says to Timothy: "Attend to reading, to exhortation, and to doctrine," and "continue in them always." Therefore, let priests be familiar with the Sacred Scriptures and the canons; let their entire work consist of preaching and teaching, and let them edify everyone through both knowledge of the faith and the discipline of good works.") But failures must have happened over the centuries: John Purvey quoted English bishop Robert Grosseteste:

If any priest says he cannot preach (i.e. give composed or extemporized vernacular sermons), one remedy is: resign; [...] Another remedy, if he does not want that, is: record (i.e., recollect or write out) he in the week the naked text of the Sunday's gospel, that he understands the gross story, and tell it to the people, that is if he understands Latin and does it every week of the year. And if he understands no Latin, go he to one of his neighbours that understands, which will charitably expound it to him, and thus edify he his flock[...]

— Robert Grosseteste, Bishop of Lincoln, Scriptum est de Levitis (c. 1240)

- At times, vernacular hymns were sung. For example, a German: Leis hymn, sung after the sermon from the 12th century.
- The pain bénit was bread given in the general offering by the laity, blessed by the priest, and given back to the laity for devotional use and as alms, especially when lay communion was infrequent.
- Another sacramental activity performed with the laity was the kiss of peace and pax-board with its emphasis on mutual forgiveness.

Historian Eamon Duffy has noted that the Medieval laity were not passive in church, but as the sacraments progressively became celebrated in their minimal forms (e.g., dribbling not washing, communion in one kind once a year, etc.) they compensated by the development many para-liturgical practices, such as the pax board and Holy Loaf (pain bénit), which demonstrates "a vigorous lay appropriation of the meaning of the sacraments" by the people who inhabited a shared culture of Christian symbolism.

There are few records about the liturgy in remote, rural areas.

== Comparison of the Mass, c. 200 to c. 2000 AD ==
This table is indicative. Depending on calendar, occasion, participants, region and period, some parts might be augmented or commented on (tropes). "Gifts" primarily means the unconsecrated bread, wine and water.

The Ambrosian Rite has different prayers, prefaces, readings, calendar and vestments to the Roman Rite. It omits the Agnus Dei. The Gesture of Peace occurs before the Offertory.

c. 200–350	c. 400	c. 1000	c. 2000
Greek, then Latin	Latin	Latin	Vernacular
Synaxis (Meeting)	Misa of the Catechumens	Fore-Mass	Liturgy of the Word
Greeting: "Grace of our Lord"	Introductory greeting	Entrance ceremonies: Introit; Kyrie; Gloria in Excelsis Deo; Collect	Introductory Rites: Entrance (Introit); Greeting: "Grace of our Lord"; Penitential Act (Kyrie); Glory to God (Gloria); Collect
Lessons (Readings) interspersed with Psalmody	Lesson 1: the Prophets; Responsorial psalm; Lesson 2: Epistle; Responsorial psalm; Lesson 3: Gospel	Service of readings: Epistle; Gradual; Alleluia or Tract; Sequence (optional); Gospel	Liturgy of the Word: First reading (OT); Responsorial Psalm; Second reading (NT); Gospel acclamation; Gospel
Sermon – vernacular "words of comfort"	Sermon in dialect	Vernacular Sermon or paraphrase of Gospel reading	Homily
Dismissal of "hearers" and unbelievers (Note: Maskell suggests that the dismissals and simplicity are caused both because of unwillingness to "cast pearls before swine" (p. xxviii) and immanent danger from persecution (p. xxi).); Bidding prayers; Collect for the catechumens and their dismissal; Collect for the energumens and their dismissal; Collect for the competentes and illuminandi (candidates for baptism) and their dismissal; Collect for the penitentes and their dismissal	Prayer; Dismissal of the catechumens	Credo; (Nicene Creed introduced 1014); "Oremus"; (Vernacular bidding prayers/Prône)	Dismissal of the catechumens; Creed (Credo); Prayer of the faithful (Oremus); Amen
Eucharist (Thanksgiving)	Communion of the Faithful	Sacrifice-Mass	Liturgy of the Eucharist
Priestly prayers; Washing of hands; Kiss of peace; Presentation of gifts; Secret; Sign of cross	Offering of gifts Prayer over the offerings	Offertory rites: Offertory; Prayers and Psalm 25; Little Canon (Preparation of gifts); Secret (Preparation of the altar)	Presentation of gifts; Preparation of the altar
Anaphora (Canon): Collective prayer; Consecration; Thanksgiving; Amen of the people	Eucharistic prayers	Eucharistic prayers: Preface; Sanctus; Canon; Elevation	Eucharistic prayers: Preface; Holy, Holy, Holy (Sanctus); Canon; Consecration; Elevation; Mystery of Faith; Doxology; Amen
Fraction; Distribution of elements	Communion rites: Psalm accompanying Communion; Communion; Leavened bread loaves, from people's offering, in hand; Wine and water, frequently drunk with straw (or calamus) or spoon; Briefly in the 490s Pope Gelasius I made communion under both kinds mandatory.; Prayer	Communion cycle: Pater noster; Agnus Dei; Fraction; Communion; Minimum: three times per year, then annually at Easter (from 1215); Leavened or unleavened bread, on tongue (Note: From 650, Council of Rouen.); Wine and water, mostly drunk with straw/pippette (or calamus); later withheld from laity; Prayers; Postcommunion	Lord's Prayer (Pater noster); Sign of Peace; Lamb of God (Agnus Dei); Fraction; Communion; Minimum: annually (Easter); typical: weekly; maximum: daily (+ one special Mass); Unleavened wafers, in hand in regions where Bishops' conference approves, on tongue otherwise; Wine with water, from chalice, in dioceses where Bishop has permitted; Prayer after communion; Amen
Collection for the needy	Dismissal of the faithful	Ite, missa est or Benedicamus Domino	Concluding rites: Announcements; Final Blessing; Dismissal

== See also ==
- Catholic Church
- Eucharist in the Catholic Church
- Eucharist in Lutheranism
- The Mass
- Catholic particular churches and liturgical rites

=== Western Catholic ===
- Latin liturgical rites
  - Roman Rite
    - Tridentine Mass
    - Mass of Paul VI
  - Norbertine Rite
  - Cistercian Rite
  - Traditional Ambrosian Rite
  - Ambrosian Rite
  - Aquileian Rite
  - Bragan Rite
  - Carthusian Rite
  - Carmelite Rite
  - Celtic Rites or Uses
  - Dominican Rite
  - Durham Rite
  - Frankish (Merovingian) rite
  - Gallican Rite
  - Mozarabic Rite
  - African Rite
  - Preconciliar rites after the Second Vatican Council
