= Ensemble for the celebration of the Eucharist =

Collection of items

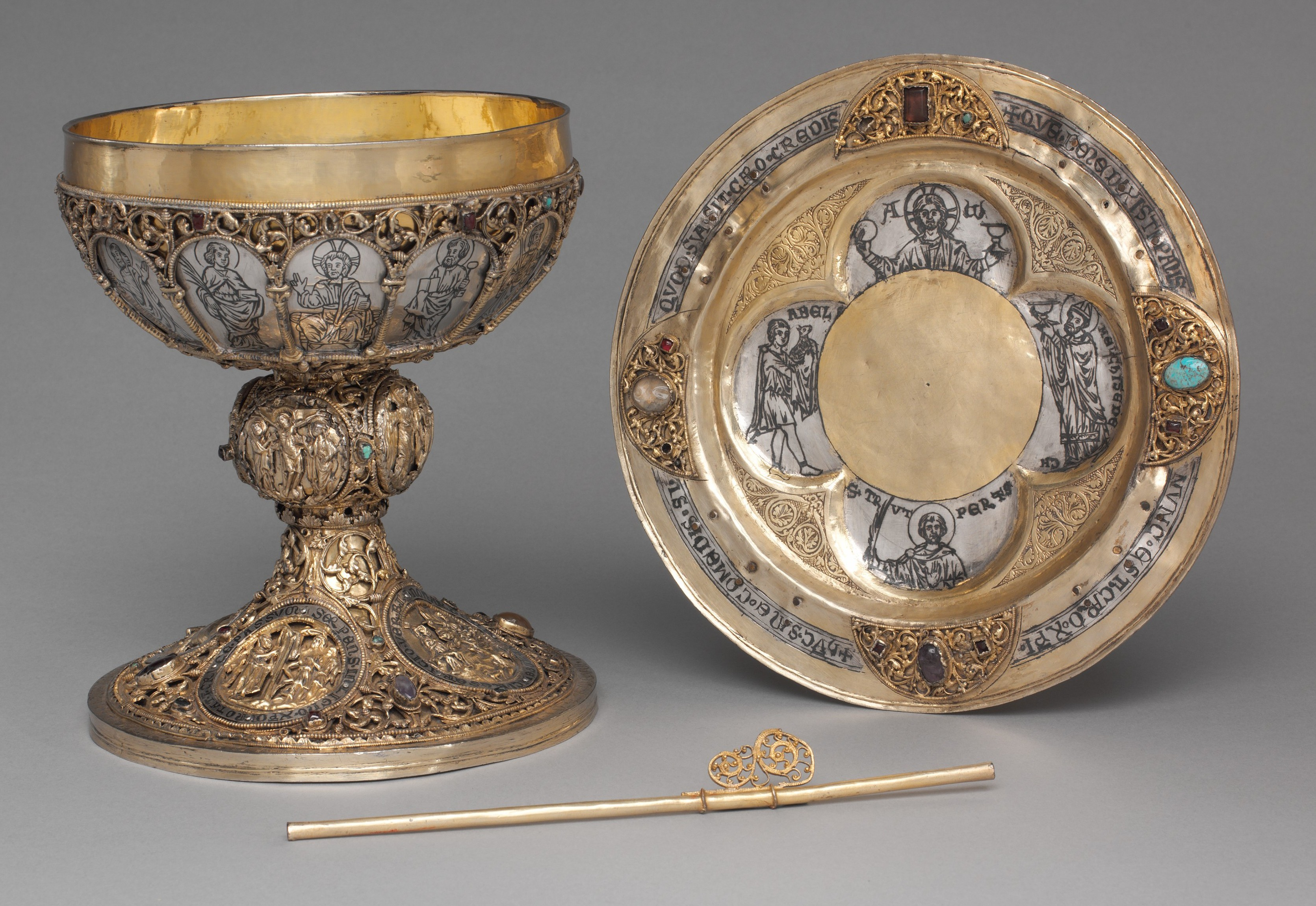
- The complete ensemble, containing a paten, chalice, and straw
- Artist: Unknown
- Year: c. 1240
- Location: Metropolitan Museum of Art, The Cloisters

The Metropolitan Museum of Art possesses a collection of items used for the celebration of the Eucharist. The ensemble, which includes a paten, a chalice, and a straw, is currently on display at The Cloisters.

== Description ==
In Catholicism, the Eucharist is a liturgical rite that is performed as a holy sacrament. In the course of the ceremony, bread and wine are consecrated and considered changed in substance into the body and blood of Christ and are then consumed by the participants. The ceremony is considered of great importance, and thus special items are made exclusively for use during the sacrament. These items are commonly made of valuable materials such as gold or silver, earthly elements strongly associated with Christ. The principal items used are a plate (called a paten) and a chalice; the paten holds the communion bread, while the chalice holds the wine.

=== Paten ===
The paten in the collection of the Metropolitan Museum of Art dates to the late 13th century. The piece was likely made for the monastery of Saint Trudpert in Southern Germany. Made from gilded silver, the plate depicts four figures arranged in a four-pointed cross centered around a golden disc. At the top of the cross, Christ is depicted holding a chalice. On the sides of the cross, two figures from the Old Testament flank Christ; the priest-king Melchizedek to Christ's left, Abel to his right. Saint Trudpert is seen at the bottom of the cross, indicating that the pattern was made for the monks of Saint Trudpert.

=== Chalice ===
The MET possess in its collection a chalice from Medieval Germany; as with the pattern it is displayed with, the chalice is likely from the monastery of Saint Trudpert in Germany. The chalice, done in silver, gold, and niello, is intricately detailed and adorned with jewels. The chalice's relief metalwork depicts scenes from scenes from the New Testament and the Twelve Apostles.

=== Straw ===
The third item in the ensemble is a straw, also known as a fistula or calamus, used to sip the wine held by the chalice. Historically, a straw was needed to ensure that none of the consecrated wine was spilled during the Eucharist. Made from gilded silver, the straw features an intricate, vine-like grip made from silver and studded with gems.

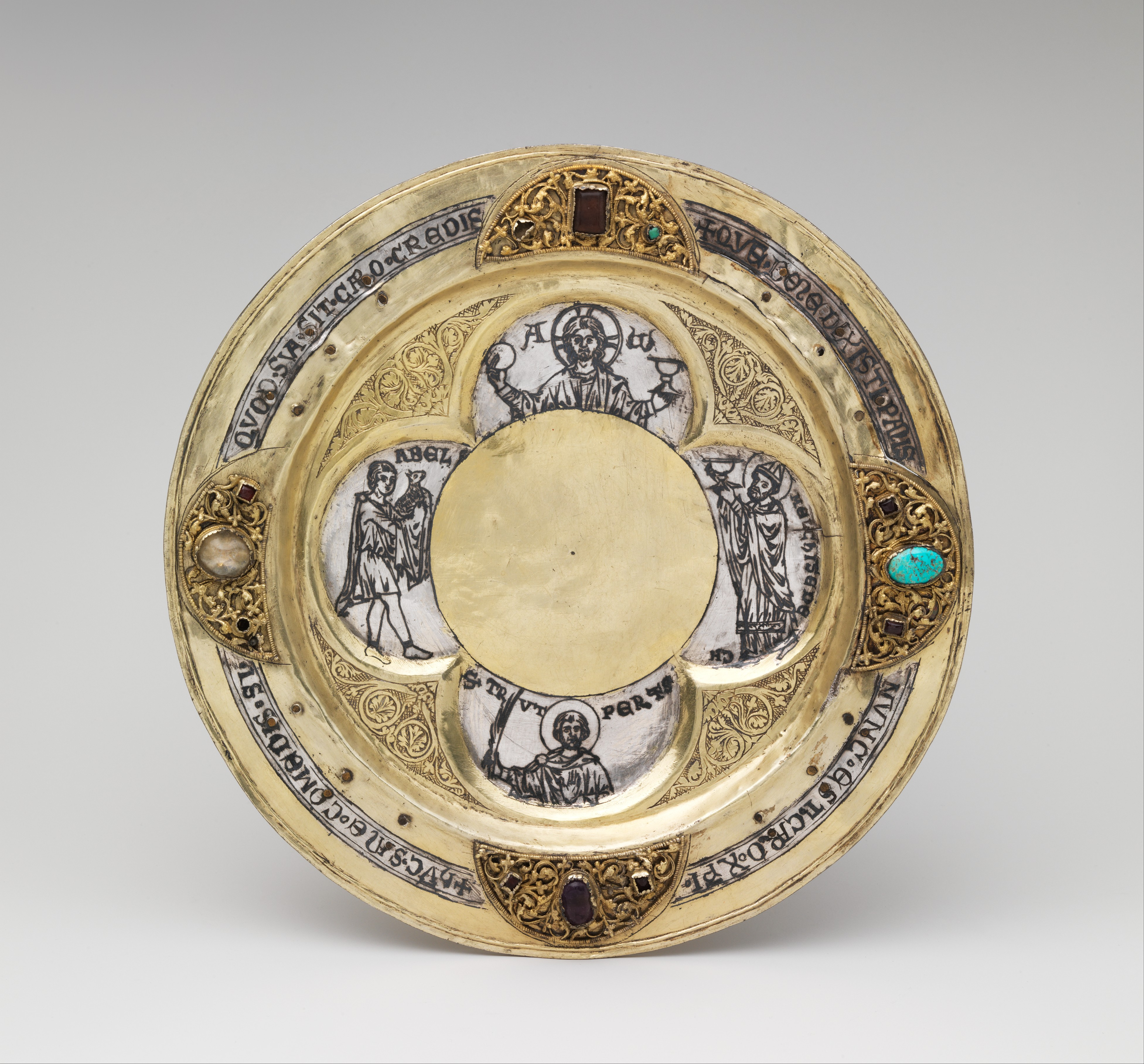
The paten, made from gilded silver.

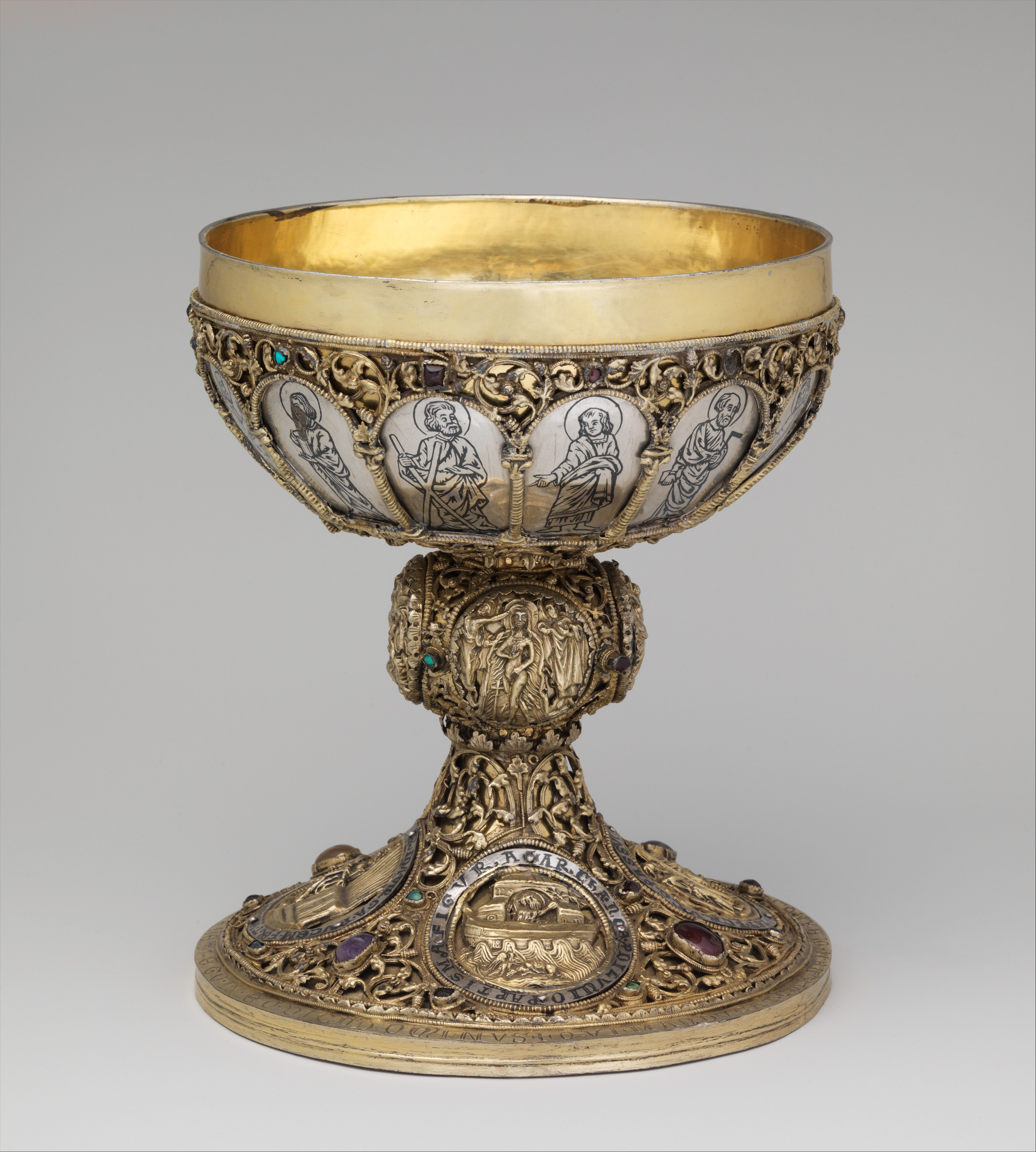
The chalice, made from gilded silver studded with jewels.

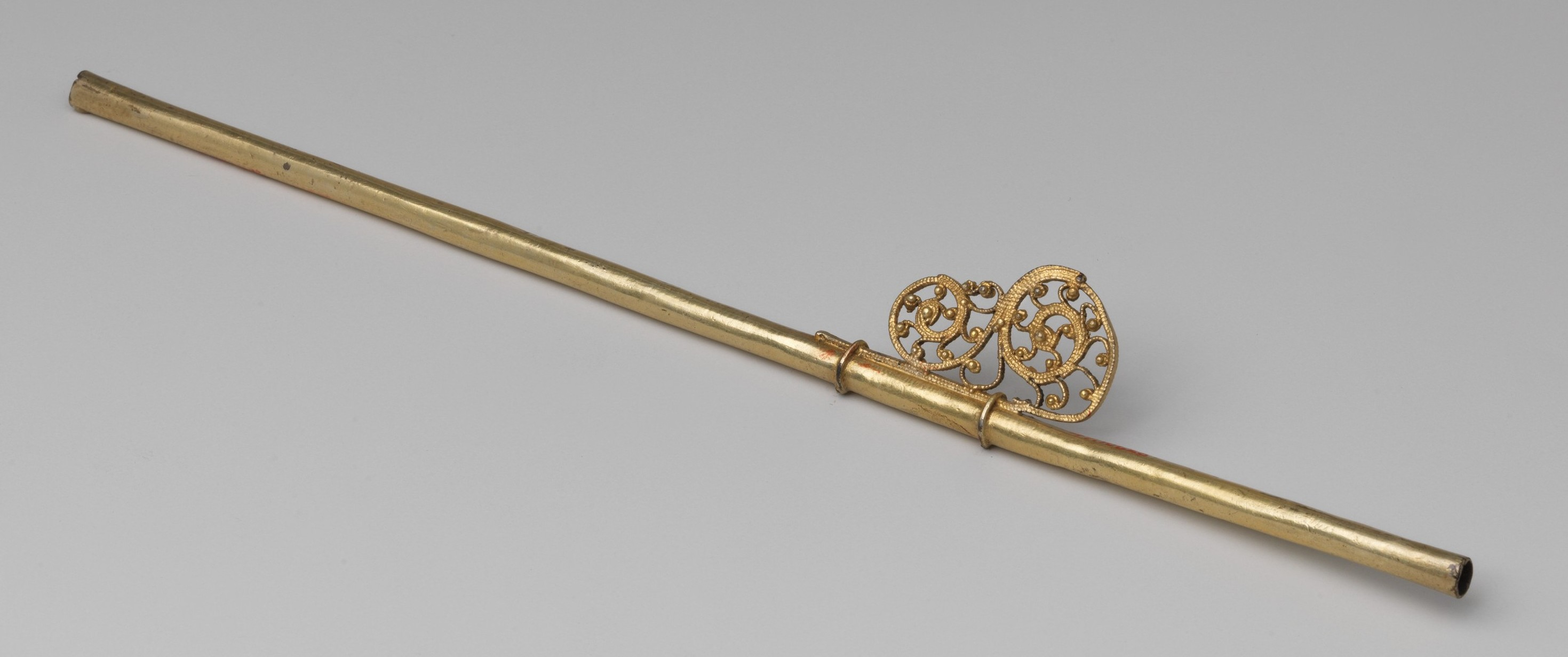
The strawl, made from gilded silver.

== See also ==
- Armenian Gospel with Silver Cover
