= Traditional Ambrosian Rite =

Roman Catholic pre-conciliar rite

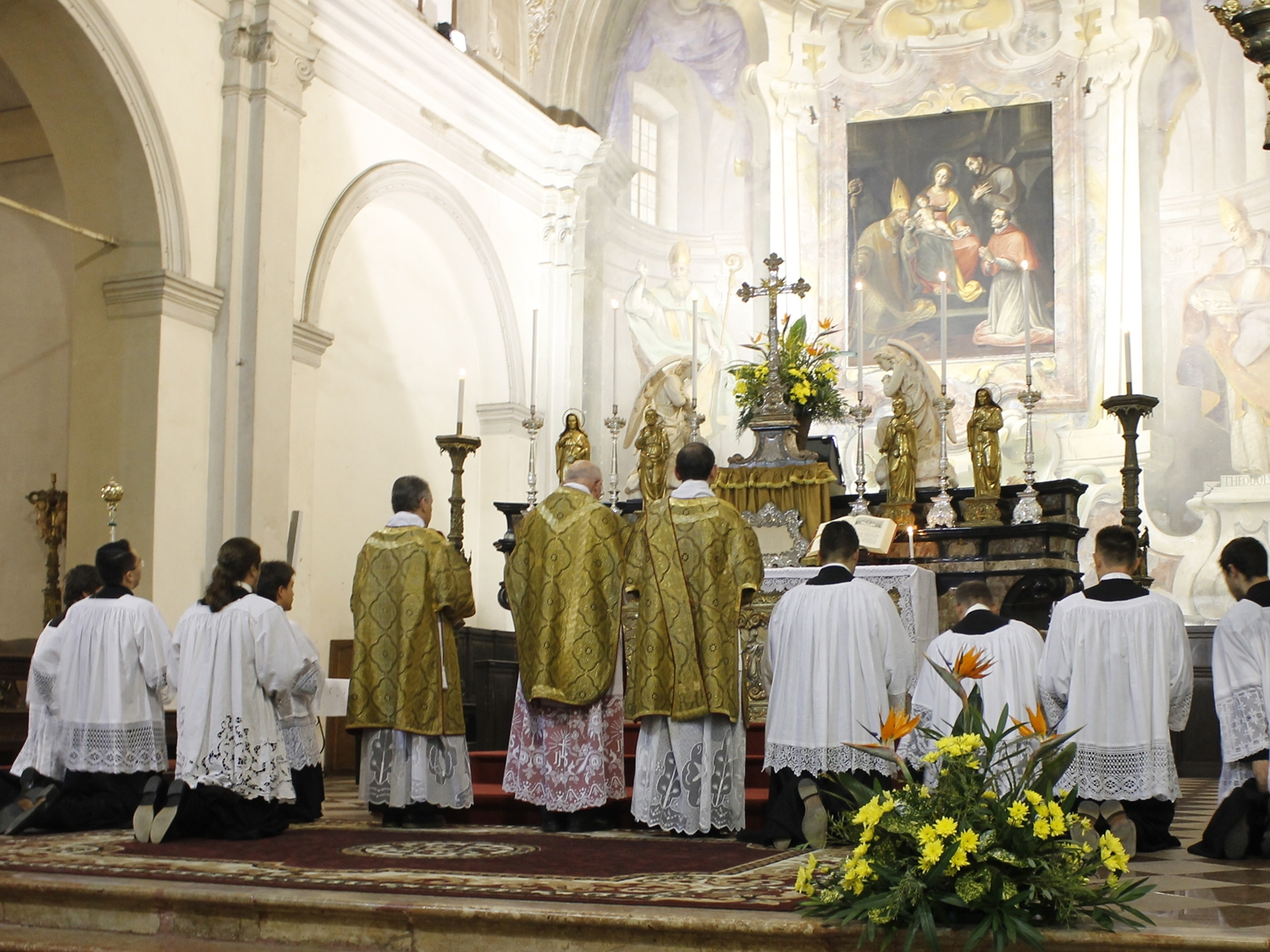
The Solemn Mass being celebrated in the Ambrosian Rite in the church of its patron, Saint Ambrose, Legnano

The Ambrosian Rite is a Latin Catholic liturgical Western Rite used in the area of Milan. The Traditional Ambrosian Rite is the form of this rite as it was used before the changes that followed the Second Vatican Council.

Nowadays the Traditional Ambrosian Rite is mainly used on Sundays and Holy Days of Obligation in the church of Santa Maria della Consolazione in Milan, using the Ambrosian Missal of 1954, as permitted by Cardinal Archbishop of Milan Carlo Maria Martini on 31 July 1985. Another celebration on Sundays and Holy Days of Obligation was authorized from 18 October 2008 onward in the town of Legnano. The Traditional Ambrosian Rite Mass may be said according to the Motu Proprio "Summorum Pontificum".

== The liturgical year ==
=== Advent and Christmas ===
The liturgical year of the Ambrosian Rite begins the First Sunday of Advent, which however takes place 2 weeks earlier than in the Roman Rite, so that there are six Sundays in Advent, and the key-day of the beginning of Advent is not St. Andrew's Day (30 November) but St. Martin's Day (11 November), which begins the Sanctorale. The same is true for the Mozarabic Rite.

On the sixth Sunday of Advent the solemnity of the Divine Maternity of the Virgin Mary is celebrated. On this Sunday there are two Masses, one of the Advent and another one of the Incarnation. This day may be compared with the Mozarabic feast of the Annunciation on 18 December.

Christmas Day has three Masses, during the night, at dawn, and during the day, as in the Roman Rite. On the second vespers of Epiphany, right after the Lucernarium (or Rite of the Light) a typical ambrosian antiphon called Omnes Patriarchae is sung four times. In the Cathedral, the Archbishop together with the whole chapter solemnly pay hommage to the statue of Christ child. The day after the Epiphany is the "Christophoria" (the Return from Egypt). The Sundays after the Epiphany vary in number, six being the maximum, as in the Roman Rite. The second is the Feast of the Holy Name of Jesus. Then follow Septuagesima, Sexagesima, and Quinquagesima Sundays, on which, though Gloria in Excelsis and Hallelujah are used, the vestments are morello.

=== Lent and Easter ===
There is no Ash Wednesday, and Lent begins liturgically on the first Sunday, the fast beginning on the Monday. Before the reforms issued by St. Charles Borromeo, Lent started on the first Sunday called Dominica in capite Quadragesimae with a particular solemn characterization: it was celebrated in white with Gloria in excelsis Deo and the office of the day was charaacteried by Hallelujah. During the second vespers, a solemn antiphon was sung to dismiss the Hallelujah ("Quadraginta dies et noctes aperti sunt caeli, et omnes animae habentes spiritum vitae ingressae sunt in arca, et clausa est, hallelujah" - For forty days and nights the heavens were open and all souls having the spirit of life entered into the ark, and it closed, alleluja). Litanies substituting the Gloria in excelsis were prescribed in antiphonaries to be sung only from the second to the fifth Sunday of Lent according to two distinct formulas called "Divinae pacis" for odd Sundays and "Dicamus omnes" for even Sundays. After the Borromaic reforms, this liturgy started to be celebrated in violet and with the chant of litanies also on the first Sundays replacing Gloria in Excelsis and the disuse of Hallelujah.

- The title of the Sunday litany is Dominica in capite Quadragesimæ.
- The other Sundays of Lent are styled De Samaritanâ, De Abraham, De Cæco, De Lazaro. The Palm Sunday in Ramis Palmarum or Dominica Olivarum belongs to the Holy Week. The names of the second to the fifth Sundays are in allusion to the subject of the Gospel of the day, not, as in the Roman Rite, to the Introitus. (Cf. nomenclature of Greek Rite.)

Passiontide does not begin until Holy Week.

- The day before Palm Sunday is styled Sabbatum in Traditione Symboli.
- This, the Blessing of the Font, the extra Masses pro Baptizatis in Ecclesiâ Hyemali on Easter Eve and every day of Easter Week, and the name of the first Sunday after Easter in albis depositis, show even more of a lingering memory of the old Easter Baptisms than the similar survivals in the Roman Rite.
- Holy Week is Hebdomada Authentica, whose liturgy is celebrated in red vestments starting from the Palm Sunday. So are Maundy Thursday and Good Friday.

The five Sundays after Easter, Ascension, Pentecost, Trinity Sunday, and Corpus Christi follow, as in the Roman Rite, but the Triduum Litaniarum (Minor Rogations) comes on the Monday, Tuesday, and Wednesday after, instead of before, Ascension Day.

=== Ordinary Time ===
The Sundays after Pentecost are designated as such (e.g. 3rd Sunday after Pentecost) until the Decollation of St. John (29 August). There may be as many as fifteen of them. Then follow either four or five Sundays called post Decollationem S. Joannis Baptistæ, then three Sundays of October, the third of which is the feast of the Dedication of Milan Cathedral. The rest of the Sundays until Advent are called post Dedicationem.

=== Calendar of the Saints ===
There are many local saints, and several feasts which are given in the Roman Calendar in late February, March, and early April are given on other days, because of the rule against feasts in Lent. Only St. Joseph and the Annunciation come in the Lenten part of the Calendar, but the Masses of these are given on 12 December and the sixth Sunday of Advent respectively. The days are classified as follows:

1. Solemnitates Domini
  - First Class: the Annunciation, Christmas Day, Epiphany, Easter Day with its Monday and Tuesday, Ascension Day, Pentecost, with its Monday and Tuesday, Corpus Domini, the Dedication of the Cathedral or of the local church, Solemnitas Domini titularis propriæ Ecclesiæ.
  - First class, secondary: the Feast of the Sacred Heart.
  - Second class: the Visitation, Circumcision, Purification, Transfiguration, Invention of the Cross, Trinity Sunday.
  - Second class, secondary: the Name of Jesus, the Holy Family, the Exaltation of the Cross. The Octaves of Christmas, Epiphany, Easter Day, Pentecost and Corpus Domini also count as Solemnitates Domini.
2. Sundays
3. Solemnia B. M. V. et Sanctorum
  - First class: the Immaculate Conception, Assumption, Nativity of St. John the Baptist, St. Joseph, Saints Peter and Paul, All Saints, the Ordination of St. Ambrose, and the Patron of the local church.
  - Second class: other feasts of Our Lady, St. Michael and the Archangels, and the Guardian Angels, Decollation of St. John, Feasts of Apostles and Evangelists, St. Anne, St. Charles Borromeo, the Holy Innocents, St. Joachim, St. Laurence, St. Martin, Saints Nazarius and Celsus, Saints Protasius and Gervasius, St. Stephen, St. Thomas of Canterbury.
  - Second class, secondary: the two Chairs of St. Peter, the Conversion of St. Paul.
4. Solemnia Majora: St. Agatha, St. Agnes, St. Anthony, St. Apollinaris, St. Benedict, St. Dominic, the Translations of Saints Ambrose, Protasius, and Gervasius, St. Francis, St. Mary Magdalene, Sts. Nabor and Felix, St. Sebastian, St. Victor, St. Vincent.
5. Alia Solemnia are days noted as such in the Calendar, and the days of saints whose bodies or important relics are preserved in any particular church become Solemnia for that church.
6. Non-Solemnia Privilegiata
7. Non-Solemnia Simplicia

=== Feasts ===
Feasts are also grouped into four classes:

- First class of Solemnitates Domini and Solemnia;
- second class of the same;
- greater and ordinary Solemnia;
- non-Solemnia, divided into privilegiata and simplicia.

Solemnia have two vespers, non-Solemnia only one, the first. The privilegiata have certain propria and the simplicia only the communia. The general principle of occurrences is that common to the whole Western Church. If two festivals fall on the same day, the lesser is either transferred, merely commemorated, or omitted.

But the Ambrosian Rite differs materially from the Roman in the rank given to Sunday, which is only superseded by a Solemnitas Domini, and not always then, for if the Name of Jesus or the Purification falls on Septuagesima, Sexagesima, or Quinquagesima Sunday, it is transferred, though the distribution and procession of candles takes place on the Sunday on which the Purification actually falls. If a Solemne Sanctorum or a privileged non-Solemne falls on a Sunday, a Solemnitas Domini, the Friday or Saturday of the fourth or fifth week of Advent, a Feria de Exceptato, within an Octave of a great Feast, a Feria Litaniarum, or a Feria of Lent, the whole office is of the Sunday, Solemnitas Domini, etc., and the Solemne or non-Solemne privilegiatum is transferred, in most cases to the next clear day, but in the case of Solemnia of the first or second class to the next Feria, quocumque festo etiam solemni impedita. A simple non-Solemne is never transferred, but it is omitted altogether if a Solemne of the first class falls on the same day, and in other cases of occurrences it is commemorated, though of course it supersedes an ordinary Feria.

The concurrences of the first Vespers of one feast with the second of another are arranged on much the same principle, the chief peculiarity being that if a Solemne Sanctorum falls on a Monday its first Vespers is kept not on the Sunday, but on the preceding Saturday, except in Advent, when this rule applies only to Solemnia of the first and second class, and other Solemnia are only commemorated at Sunday Vespers.

=== Vestments ===
The liturgical colours of the Ambrosian Rite are very similar to those of the Roman, but with some differences. For example, ambrosian deacon use to wear the stole over the dalmatic. Colours used in the Ambrosian Rite are five: white, red, green, morello (a nuance of violet more similar to prune) and black. The most important differences in its use are:

- white is used for Solemnitates Domini and for all feasts of the Blessed Virgin Mary (and on the VI Sunday of Advent, Divine Maternity of the Virgin), of Angels, for All Saints, in the Birth of Saint John the Baptist, for the Feast of Saint John the Evangelist for the Feasts of the two Chairs of Saint Peter (Rome and Antioch), for the Conversion of Saint Paul, for the Elevation of the relics of Saints Ambrose, Gervasius and Protasius, for all feasts of saint popes, or Priests, or Confessors who never were abbots, for all Virgins non martyr, for the dedication of a church and in its anniversary. White is used also for the whole week in albis. Afterwards, starting from the first Sunday after Easter called in albis depositis, white vestments are set down literally and green vestments are used.
- red is the colour of the blood and charity and is used for the Blessed Sacrament, in the Feast of the Circumcision of the Lord, for the Saturday in Traditione Symboli, for the Holy Week, for the Feasts of the Pentecost, Corpus Domini, Sacred Heart of the Lord, for the feasts of the Holy Cross, for all the Apostles and Martyrs (except for what stated before). It is the colour used for Sundays and feriae after Pentecost and the Decollation of St. John until the second Sunday of October included.
- green is the colour of hope and its use is prescribed for Sundays and feriae after the Epiphany and before Septuagesima, for Sundays after Easter starting from the Sunday in albis depositis (literally) to the Vigil of Pentecost excluded (red is used for this mass) and from the Dedication of Milan Cathedral to the first Sunday of Advent (both excluded). It is used also for abbots.
- morello - a nuance of violet more similar to prune or brown (literally blackberry colour) - is used for Sundays and feriae of Advent, Septuagesima, Sexagesima and Quinquagesima and Lent Sundays, in the Vigils of Saints and for the feasts of Matrons.
- black is used in feriae of Lent, for Requiem Mass and during the Minor Rogation days (Monday, Tuesday and Wednesday before Pentecost).

For particular solemnities or feasts, an additional vestment called "cappino" - i.e. small cap - is hinged on chasuble (or pianeta), dalmatic and tunicle on the shoulders and around the neck of the celebrants. It is a reminiscence of golden decoration used to be hinged for amice. Actually, some golden decorations are worn also by the archbishop on the surplice, in particular on sleeves and on the lower part, in order to add solemnity to the already-decorated lace parts of surplice.

== The Divine Office ==
=== The distribution of the Psalter ===
The Ambrosian distribution of the Psalter is partly fortnightly and partly weekly. Psalms 1 to 108 are divided into ten decuriæ, one of which, in its numerical order, divided into three Nocturns, is recited at Matins on the Mondays, Tuesdays, Wednesdays, Thursdays, and Fridays of each fortnight, each Nocturn being said under one antiphon. At the Matins of Sunday and Solemnitates Domini and on Feriæ in Easter and Pentecost weeks and the octave of Corpus Christi, there are no psalms, but three Old Testament canticles, Isaias 26, De nocte vigilatâ; the Canticle of Anna (1 Kings 2), Confirmatum est; and the Canticle of Jonas, Clamavi ad Dominum, or of Habacuc, Domine audivi. And on Saturdays the Canticle of Moses (Exod. 15), Cantemus Domino, and half of Psalm 118 take the place of Decuriæ at the three Nocturns.

At Vespers, Psalms 109 to 147, except 117, 118, and 133, which are used elsewhere, and 142, which is only used in the Office of the Dead and as Psalmus Directus at Lauds on Fridays, are divided between the whole seven days of each week in their numerical sequence, and in the same manner as in the Roman Rite.

Psalm 118, besides being used on Saturdays, is distributed among the four lesser Hours exactly as in the Roman Rite; Psalm 50 is said at Lauds every day except Sunday, when the Benedicite takes its place, and Saturday, when Psalm 117, takes its place, and with the Preces (when these are used) at Prime and Terce throughout the year and at None during Lent, while at the Preces of Sext Psalm 53 is said, and at those of None Psalm 85, except during Lent. Psalm 53 precedes Beati immaculati at Prime, and Psalms 4, 30, V. 1-6, 90 and 133 are said daily, as in the Roman Rite, at Compline.

At Lauds a single Psalm, known as Psalmus Directus, differing with the day of the week, is also said.

TABLE OF DECURIÆ

Table of Decuriæ	Nocturn I	Nocturn II	Nocturn III	Day
Decuriæ 1	Ps i-viii	Ps ix-xii	Ps xiii-xvi	1st week, Monday
Decuriæ 2	Ps xvii-xx	Ps xxi-xxv	Ps xxvi-xxx	1st week, Tuesday
Decuriæ 3	Ps xxxi-xxxiii	Ps xxxiv-xxxvi	Ps xxxvii-xl	1st week, Wednesday
Decuriæ 4	Ps xli-xliii	Ps xliv-xlvi	Ps xlvii-l	1st week, Thursday
Decuriæ 5	Ps li-liv	Ps lv-lvii	Ps lviii-lx	1st week, Friday
Decuriæ 6	Ps lxi-lxiv	Ps lxv-lxvii	Ps lxviii-lxx	2nd week, Monday
Decuriæ 7	Ps lxxi-lxxv	Ps lxxvi-lxxvii	Ps lxxviii-lxxx	2nd week, Tuesday
Decuriæ 8	Ps lxxxi-lxxxiv	Ps lxxxv-lxxxvii	Ps lxxxviii-xc	2nd week, Wednesday
Decuriæ 9	Ps xci-xciii	Ps xciv-xcvi	Ps xcvii-c	2nd week, Thursday
Decuriæ 10	Ps ci-ciii	Ps civ-cv	Ps cvi-cviii	2nd week, Friday

During Lent Psalm 90 is said as Psalmus Directus at Vespers, except on Sundays, Fridays, and Saturdays, and the "Four Verses of a Psalm" at Lauds on Saturdays are alternately from the twelfth and first parts of Ps. 118, and on the six Sundays the "Four Verses" are from 69, 101, 62, 58. During Lent also the Vesper "Four Verses" are different for every day, except that there are none on Friday, and those on the first four Saturdays are from Ps. 91. In Holy Week the Psalms at the Nocturns and at Vespers are all proper, and there are also proper Psalms during the period from the first Feria de Exceptato until the Circumcision; and on the Annunciation (sixth Sunday of Advent), Epiphany, Christophoria, Name of Jesus, Ascension, Corpus Christi, the Dedication and many Solemnia Sanctorum, and on many other saints' days the Decuriœ are superseded by Psalms of the Common of Saints.

=== Other details of the Divine Office ===
- Antiphonœ, similar in construction to those in the Roman Rite are: in Psalmis et canticis, used as in the Roman Rite; in Choro, said after the Lucernarium on Sundays, at the second Vespers of Solemnia, or on other saints' days, at first Vespers, but not on Feriœ, except Saturdays in Advent; ad Crucem, said on Solemnitates Domini, on Sundays, except in Lent, and on Solemnia.
- Responsoria are constructed as in the Roman Rite, and are: Post hymnum, said after the hymn at Matins; Inter lectiones at Matins; cum Infantibus or cum Pueris after the hymn at the first Vespers of Solemnia; in Choro, said at Vespers on Sundays, at the second Vespers of Solemnia, and at the first of Non-Solemnia, after the hymn; in Baptisterio, at Lauds and Vespers of some Solemnitates after the first Psallenda, on Feriœ after the twelve Kyries, at Vespers after the prayer which follows Magnificat; Diaconalia or Quadragesimalia, on Wednesdays in Lent and on Good Friday; ad Cornu Altaris, at Lauds before the Psalmus Directus on Christmas Day, the Epiphany, and Easter Eve; Gradualia, said after the hymn at Lauds on Feriœ in Lent. Lucernaria are Responsoria which begin Vespers.
- Psallendœ are single verses, often from the Psalms, said after the twelve Kyries and the second prayer at Lauds, and after the prayers at Vespers. They are variable according to the day, and are followed by either one or two fixed Complenda or Completoria, which are also single verses.
- Psalmi Directi are said at Lauds and sometimes at Vespers. They are sung together by both choirs, not antiphonally.
- Psalmi Quatuor Versus is the name given to four verses of a psalm said at Vespers and Lauds on weekdays, after one of the Collects.
- Among the Hymns, besides those by St. Ambrose, or commonly attributed to him, many are included by other authors, such as Prudentius, Venantius Fortunatus, St. Gregory, St. Thomas Aquinas, and many whose authorship is unknown. A considerable number of well-known hymns (e. g. "Ave Maris Stella", "A Solis Ortus Cardine", "Jesu Redemptor Omnium", "Iste confessor") are not in the Ambrosian Hymnal, but there are many there which are not in the Roman, and those that are common to both generally appear as they were before the revisions of Urban VIII, though some have variants of their own.
- Capitula are short lessons of Scripture used as in the Roman Rite. At the Lesser Hours and Compline Capitula taken from the Epistles are called Epistolellœ.

=== Construction of the Divine Office ===
(The constantly occurring Dominus vobiscum, etc., has been omitted in this analysis.)

- Matins: Pater noster; Ave Maria; Deus in adjutorium; Gloria Patri; Hallelujah or Laus tibi. (The Ambrosians transliterate Hallelujah from Hebrew, not from Greek. They also write caelum not coelum and seculum not saeculum.) Hymn; Responsorium; canticle, Benedictus es (Dan. iii); Kyrie eleison, thrice Psalms or Canticles of the three Nocturns; Lessons, with Responsoria and Benedictions — usually three Lessons, Sundays, homilies; weekdays from the Bible; saints' days, Bible and life of saint. On Christmas Day and Epiphany nine lessons; on Good Friday, six; on Easter Eve, none. On Sundays and festivals, except in Lent and Advent, Te Deum follows.
- Lauds: Introduction as at Matins; canticle, Benedictus, Attende cœlum or Clamavi; Kyrie, thrice; Antiphona ad Crucem, repeated five or seven times, not said on Feriœ; Oratio secreta i; canticle, Cantemus Domino (Ex. xv); Kyrie, thrice; Oratio secreta ii; canticle, Benedicite, Confitemini Domino (Ps. cxvii), or Miserere (Ps. l); Kyrie, thrice; Oratio i; psalms, Laudate (Pss. cxlviii-cl, cxvi); Capitulum; Kyrie, thrice. Psalmus Directus; hymn (on weekdays in Lent, Graduale); Kyrie, twelve times. On Sundays and festivals, Psallenda and Completorium; on Feriœ, Responsorium in Baptisterio; Kyrie, thrice; Oratio ii. On Sundays and Solemnitates Domini, Psallenda ii and Completorium ii; on weekdays Psalmi iv, versus and Completorium; Kyrie, thrice; Oratio iii; commemorations, if any; concluding versicles and responses.
- Little Hours (Prime, Terce, Sext, None): Introduction as at Matins. Hymn; psalms; Epistolella; Responsorium Breve (at Prime, Quicunque vult); Capitulum; Preces (when said); at Prime, three Orationes, at other Hours, one; Kyrie, thrice; Benedicamus Domino, etc. (at Prime in choir the Martyrology, followed by Exultabunt Sancti etc., and a prayer); Fidelium animœ etc.
- Vespers: Introduction as at Matins. On Sundays and Feriae: Lucernarium; (on Sundays, Antiphona in choro); hymn; Responsorium in choro; five psalms; Kyrie, thrice; Oratio i; Magnificat; Oratio ii; on Sundays, Psallenda i, and two Completoria; on Feriœ, Responsorium in Baptisterio; Kyrie, thrice; Oratio iii; on Sundays, Psallenda ii, and two Completoria; on Feriœ, Psalmi iv versus; Kyrie, thrice; Oratio iv; commemorations, if any. On saints' days; Lucernarium; at second vespers Antiphona in choro; hymn; Responsorium in choro or cum infantibus; psalm; Kyrie, thrice; Oratio i; Psalm; Oratio ii; Magnificat; Kyrie, thrice; Oratio iii; Psallenda and two Completoria; Kyrie, thrice; Oratio iv; commemorations. Concluding versicles and responses.
- Compline: Introduction, with addition of Converte nos, etc.; hymn (Te Lucis); Psalms iv, xxx, 1-7, xc, cxxxii, cxxxiii, cxvi; Epistolella; Responsorium; Nunc Dimittis; Capitulum; Kyrie, thrice; Preces (when said); Oratio i, Oratio ii; concluding versicles and responses; Antiphon of Our Lady; Confiteor. There are antiphons to all psalms, except those of Compline, and to all canticles. During Lent, except on Saturdays and Sundays, there are two lessons (from Genesis and Proverbs) after Terce; and on Wednesdays and Fridays of Lent and on Feriœ de Exceptato litanies are said then.

== The Mass ==
Many parts of the Ambrosian Mass agreed nearly word-for-word with the Tridentine Mass of the Roman Rite, especially towards the end of the Mass. Starting from the beginning of the liturgical celebration, specific differences are:

- The cross with the crucifix is always facing the celebrant while proceeding (in the Roman Rite it faces the crowd).
- During solemnities, the initial procession stops at the footsteps of the Sanctuary and so-called XII Kyrie are sung twelve times. Then an ambrosian antiphon called Psallenda (different for each feast) is sung twice, with Gloria Patri-Sicut erat in between. During the Gloria Patri verse, all the accolytes bow to the cross, while during the Sicut erat verse all bow to the celebrant. Only at this time, they enter the Sanctuary and the Mass begins.
- On Feasts of Martyrs, the liturgical burning of the faro (a large cotton sphere suspended in the air, inside the church) through a triple chandelier remind the offer of their lifes to God. If this happens, the rite resumes after the Confession.
- During the Mass, four prayers are said: Prayer over the people (oratio super populum), Prayer over the altar shroud (oratio super sindonem), Prayer over the Gifts (oratio super oblatam) and Prayer after the communion (oratio post communionem). The celebrant always faces the altar aside in front of the missal when he said "Dominus vobiscum". Conversely, in the Roman Rite the priest comes to the center of the altar and after having kissed it turns to the people saying "Dominus vobiscum".
- Kyrie, eleison were repeated always three times after each "Dominus vobiscum" not followed by a prayer
- The initial antiphon is called Ingressa and has not the form of the roman Introitus (i.e. antiphon, psalm, Gloria, antiphon). The only example of Ingressa equal to roman Introitus is "Requiem aeternam" during the Mass of the Dead.
- After the Gloria in excelsis Deo Kyrie, eleison is sung or recited three times.
- The celebrant blesses the readers (accolyte or the sub-deacon or the deacon). The reader asks for the blessing saying to the priest: "Jube, Domine, benedicere" ("Bless me, father"). Then, while tracing the sign of the cross, the main celebrant tells the reader: "Prophetica (or Apostolica) lectio sit nobis salutis eruditio" ("Be the Reading a lecture of salvation").
- The Gospel is followed by an antiphon called Post Evangelium (absent in the Roman Rite).
- The Gesture of Peace occurs before the Offertory. During the presentation of the Gifts, neither Secreta nor "Orate, fratres" (pray brothers and sisters) are said as it happens in the Roman rite.
- The Creed follows the Preparation of the Gifts and before the Prayer over the Gifts.
- There are some differences between the Canon of the Ambrosian Missal and the Roman Canon; The Ambrosian Rite has several proper Eucharistic Prayers for Communicantes, used on Christmas, Epiphany, Easter, Ascension, Pentecost and their octaves and for Holy Thursday. For the common part, different Saints are recalled with respect to the Roman. The celebrant washed his hands right before the Consecration, no Lavabo inter innocentes is said. After the Elevation, the celebrant extends his arms in the shape of the cross. After having said loudly "Nobis quoque minimis et peccatoribus", he marks three signs of the cross the Holy Species, then three signs with the Host in hand over the calix and then with the plate, finishing the Canon saying or singing "per infinita saecula saeculorum".
- The priest breaks the Host and places a piece in the main chalice before the Lord's Prayer, while an antiphon (the Confractorium) is sung or recited.
- After the Pater Noster, the priest loudly recites or sings the "Libera nos, quaesumus, Domine" prayer, whose text is slightly different from the Roman rite, followed by "Pax et communicatio Domini Nostri Jesu Christi sit semper vobiscum". Here, all sign with two signs of cross at the beginning of each of the aforementioned prayers.
- The Agnus Dei is not said (in the traditional Ambrosian rite Agnus Dei was said or sung only at the Mass for the Dead).
- The Communion is always delivered under one species only - the consecrated bread - simply saying to the faithful "Corpus Christi" ("The body of Christ") to which the faithful answers "Amen". This underlines the dialogic form of the Ambrosian liturgy.
- At the end of the Mass, after the last prayer (oratio post communionem) the celebrant says "Dominus vobiscum" followed by "Et cum spiritu tuo. Kyrie, eleison. Kyrie eleison. Kyrie, eleison" three times. Instead of saying Ite, missa est ("The Mass is ended, go in peace") the priest says "Benedicat et exaudiat nos Deus", "Procedamus cum pace" to which the people respond "In nomine Christi" ("In the name of Christ") and "Benedicamus Domino". The final blessing is recited in low mass or sung in sung mass.
- The Ambrosian Rite has its own cycle of readings at Mass.
- Many of the prayers said by the priest during Mass are peculiar to the Ambrosian Rite. Prefaces are all proper for each feast (there are no common prefaces).

There are also a number of ceremonial or rubrical differences, the most noticeable of which are:

- When the deacon and sub-deacon are not occupied, they take up positions at the north (in cornu Evangelii) and south ends (in cornu Epistolae) of the altar facing each together with the celebrant the centre of the rite which is Christ. The Ambrosian rite is so-called Christ-centred - i.e. centred on Christ.
- Some canons (like the canons of the Cathedral) are entitled to wear vestments commonly associated with bishops ("more episcopali"), including the mitre and the ring, but without the bishop's staff. Instead of it, they are entitled to carry the so-called ferula, a short staff with a cross-bearing orb (also the papal ferula, composed by a bigger cross).
- The Prophecy, Epistle, and Gospel are read, in Milan Cathedral, from the great ambon (pulpit) on the north side of the choir, and the procession thereto is accompanied with some state.
- The offering of bread and wine by the men and women of the Scuola di S. Ambrogio.
- The filing past and kissing the north corner of the altar at the Offertory.
- When the archbishop addresses the episcopal blessing in the Cathedral at the end of the solemn pontifical mass, a particular antiphon is sung by the schola cantorum "Princeps Ecclesiae, pastor ovilis, tu nos benedicere digneris" ("Prince of the Church, Shepherd of the fold, deign to bless us"). Then, the archdeacon of the Cathedral sings "Humiliate vos ad benedictionem" ("Bend down for the blessing") to whom the people responds "Deo gratias semper agamus" ("Always shall we thank God"). A liturgical privilege of the Archbishop of Milan is to sing Vespers wearing the chasuble in place of the cope.

=== Two Cathedrals ===
In the rubrics of the Missal there are certain survivals of ancient usage which could only have applied to the city of Milan itself, and may be compared with the "stations" affixed to certain Masses in the Roman Missal of to-day.

The Ambrosian Rite supposes the existence of two cathedrals, the Basilica Major or Ecclesia Æstiva ("summer church"), and the Basilica Minor or Ecclesia Hiemalis ("winter church"). Lejay, following Giulini, calls the Ecclesia Major (St. Mary's) the winter church, and St. Thecla the summer church (Cabrol, Dictionnaire d'archéologie chrétienne, col. 1382 sqq.), but Ecclesia Hiematis and Ecclesia Major in the "Bergamo Missal", and Ecclesia Hiemalis and Ad Sanctam Mariam, in all missals, are evidently contrasted with one another. Also the will of Berengarius I, founding St. Rafaele (quoted by Giulini, I, 416) speaks of the latter being near the summer church, which it is, if the summer church is St. Mary's.

There is also assumed to be a detached baptistery and a Chapel of the Cross, though mentions of these are found chiefly in the Breviary, and in earlier times the church of St. Laurence was the starting point of the Palm Sunday ceremonies. The greater, or summer, church, under the patronage of Our Lady, is now the Cathedral; the lesser, or winter, church, which stood at the opposite end of the Piazza del Duomo, and was destroyed in 1543, was under the patronage of St. Thecla.

As late as the time of Beroldus (twelfth century) the changes from one to the other were made at Easter and at the Dedication of the Great Church (third Sunday in October), and even now the rubric continues to order two Masses on certain great days, one in each church, and on Easter Eve and through Easter week one Mass is ordered daily pro baptizatis in Ecclesia Hiemali, and another, according to the Bergamo book, in Ecclesia Majori. The modern books say in omni ecclesiâ. There were two baptisteries, both near the greater church.

== The Occasional Services ==
=== Baptism ===
The ceremonies of Baptism differ in their order from those of the Roman Rite. The Ambrosian order is: renunciation; ephphatha; sufflation; unction; exorcism and second sufflation; signing with the Cross; delivery of the salt; introduction into the church; Creed and Lord's Prayer; declaration of faith; Baptism, for which the rubric is: Ter occiput mergit in aqua in crucis formam (and, as Legg points out, the Ambrosians boast that their baptism is always by immersion); litany; anointing with chrism; delivery of white robe and candle; dismissal. A great part of the wording is exactly the same as the Roman Rite.

=== Anointing of the Sick ===
The order of the Unction of the Sick shows the progress of Roman influence in modern times. The service at present used differs very little except at one point from that given by Magistretti (Mon. Vet., II, 79, 94, 147) from early Manuscripts, and from the form in the undated printed Ritual of the late fifteenth century, but the difference at that point is no less than the introduction of the Roman manner and words of anointing.

The old Ambrosian Rite was to anoint the sick person on the breast, the hands, and the feet, with the words: "Ungo te oleo sanctificato, more militis unctus et preparatus ad luctam aerias possis catervas. Operare creatura olei, in nomine+Dei Patris omnipotentis+et Filii+et Spiritus Sancti, ut non lateat spiritus immundus nec in membris nec in medullis nec in ulla compagine membrorum hujus hominis [vel mulieris] sed operetur in eo virtus Christi Filii Altissimi qui cum æterno Patri... . Amen." Then, "Quidquid peccasti per cogitationem cordis [per operationem manuum vel per ingressum pedum] parcat tibi Deus. Amen."

The fifteenth-century printed Ritual varies the first anointing. Instead of "Quidquid peccasti", it reads, "Per istam unctionem et cristi sacratissimam passionem si quid peccasti, etc.", the other two being as in the older books. The Ungo te, etc., is repeated with each.

A somewhat similar form, but shorter, with the anointing of the five senses and reading Ungimus for Ungo, is given in Harl. Manuscript 2990, an early fifteenth-century North Italian fragment, and in the Venetian printed pre-Tridontine Rituals, a form very like the last (but reading Ungo) with the same anointings as in the Roman Rite, is given as the rite of the Patriarchate of Venice. This form, or something very like it, with the seven anointings is found in the Asti Ritual described by Gastoué.

In the modern Ambrosian Ritual the Roman seven anointings and the form, Per istam unctionem, etc., are taken over bodily and the Ungo te has disappeared.

=== Matrimony ===
The differences in the Order of Matrimony are very slight, and the other contents of the Ritual call for no special remark.

=== Consecration of Church ===
In the ninth-century Pontifical published by Magistretti the consecration of a church includes the solemn entry, the writing of the ABCturium, with the cambutta (that Gaelic word, cam bata, crooked staff, which is commonly used in Gallican books), the blessing and mixture of salt, water, ashes, and wine, the sprinkling and anointing of the church and the altar, the blessing of various utensils, and at the end the deposition of the relics.

The order given by Mercati from an eleventh-century Manuscript at Lucca differs from the ninth-century form in that there is a circumambulation and sprinkling, with the signing of the cross on the door, the writing of an alphabet per parietem and the making of three crosses on each wall with chrism, before the entry, and there is no deposition of relics. There are also considerable differences of wording. The ordinations in the ninth-century Manuscript are of the same mixed Roman and Gallican type, but are less developed than those of the modern Roman Pontifical.

== See also ==
- Ambrosian Rite
- Ambrosian chant
- Ambrosians
- St. Ambrose
- Catholic Liturgical Rites
- Roman Catholic Archdiocese of Milan
