= Anabaptist Ambrosians =

The name Ambrosians is given to a 16th-century Anabaptist sect, as also to various Catholic religious orders.

This sect laid claim to immediate communication with God through the Holy Spirit. Basing their theology upon the words of the Gospel of John 1: 9 -- "There was the true light which lighteth every man, coming into the world"—they denied the necessity of any priests or ministers to interpret the Bible. Their leader Ambrose went so far as to hold further that the revelation which was vouchsafed to him was a higher authority than the Scriptures. The doctrine of the Ambrosians, who belonged probably to that section of the Anabaptists known as Pneumatici, may be compared with the "Inner light" doctrine of the Quakers.
