= Reliquary Cross with Relics of Saint George =

- Year: 1746
- Medium: Silver, emerald, coral, cornelian, colored stones, glass, and silver gilt
- Dimensions: 29 cm × 3.5 cm × 29 cm (11 in × 1.4 in × 11 in)
- Location: Metropolitan Museum of Art; New York City

The Metropolitan Museum of Art holds in its collection an Armenian reliquary cross dating to the 18th century. Crafted from a variety of valuable materiel, the cross was made for the Monastery of St. George at Lim in Western Armenia. The piece is inscribed with a warning, reading "Whoever dares to give it [the relic] as a pledge or take it away from Saint George, let them incur his vengeance."

== See also ==
- Armenian Gospel with Silver Cover
