= Ambrosians =

Members of religious orders

Ambrosians are members of one of the religious brotherhoods which at various times since the 14th century have sprung up in and around Milan, Italy. In the 16th century, a sect of Anabaptist Ambrosians was founded.

== Orders ==
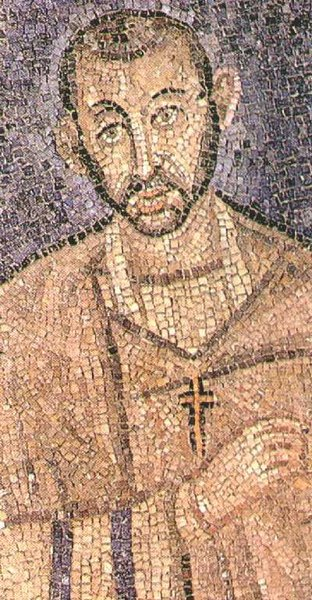
Late Antique Mosaic of Saint Ambrose (~337-397) in Sant'Ambrogio church, Milan, Lombardy, Italy, possibly an actual portrait made in his lifetime

Only the oldest of the Catholic Ambrosians, the Fratres S. Ambrosii ad Nemus, had anything more than a very local significance. This order is known from a bull of Pope Gregory XI addressed to the monks of the church of St Ambrose outside Milan.

Saint Ambrose, Bishop of Milan, certainly did not found religious orders, though he took an interest in the monastic life and watched over its beginnings in his diocese, providing for the needs of a monastery outside the walls of Milan, as Saint Augustine recounts in his Confessions. Ambrose also made successful efforts to improve the moral life of women in the Milan of his time by promoting the permanent institution of Virgins, as also of widows. His exhortations and other interventions have survived in various writings:

- De virginibus
- De viduis
- De virginitate
- De institutione virginis
- De exhortatione virginitatis
- De lapsu virginis consecratae

Ambrose was the only Father of the Church to leave behind so many writings on the subject and his attentions naturally enough led to the formation of communities which later became formal monasteries of women.

It is against this background that two religious orders or congregations—one of men and one of women, when founded in the Milan area during the 13th and 15th centuries—took Saint Ambrose as their patron and hence adopted his name.

=== Order of St Ambrose ===
The first of the groups to adopt the name of St Ambrose was formed in a cave in a wood (Latin nemus, a term later used in their name) outside Milan by three rich Milanese nobles, Alessandro Crivelli, Antonio Petrasancta, and Alberto Besozzo, who were joined by numerous others, including lay hermits and priests and came over time to adopt a cenobitic form of life. Their chosen initial locality was associated traditionally with St Ambrose. In 1375 Pope Gregory XI approved them as an order with the obligation of following the Rule of St Augustine, and celebration the liturgy according to the Ambrosian Rite. Initially the various houses founded were quasi autonomous and had no formal bond between them. Subsequently Pope Eugene IV, in a bull of 4 October 1441, formed them into an order on the mendicant model, with the name "Fratres Sancti Ambrosii ad Nemus" The brethren were ruled by a rector general, elected by a general chapter meeting every three years, and assisted in his duties by two "visitors". Upon election the rector general was instituted by the Archbishop of Milan. The friars wore a habit consisting of a brown tunic, scapular, and hood. The priests of the congregation undertook preaching and other tasks of the ministry but were not allowed to accept the charge of parishes. The original house adjacent to the then Milanese church of San Primo was constituted as the order's main seat. There was another important house at Parabiago, a town located to the North West of Milan, and outside the Milan diocese only two other houses existed, both in Rome: San Clemente and San Pancrazio.

In 1579 Saint Charles Borromeo, Archbishop of Milan, successfully reformed their discipline, which had grown lax. In 1589 Pope Sixtus V united to the Congregation of St Ambrose the houses of a group known as the "Brothers of the Apostles of the Poor Life" (or "Apostolini" or "Brothers of St. Barnabas"), whose houses were located in the province of Genoa and in the March of Ancona. This was an order that had been founded by Giovanni Scarpa at the end of the 15th century. The union was confirmed by Pope Paul V in 1606, at which time the congregation added the name of St. Barnabas to its title, adopted new constitutions and divided its houses into four provinces. Two of these, were in effect the two communities in Rome already mentioned, San Clemente and San Pancrazio.

Published works have survived from the pen of Ascanio Tasca and Michele Mulozzani, each of whom was superior-general, and of Zaccaria Visconti, Francesco-Maria Guazzi and Paolo Fabulotti. Although various Ambrosians were given the title of Blessed in recognition of their holiness: Antonio Gonzaga of Mantua, Filippo of Fermo, and Gerardo of Monza, the order was eventually dissolved by Pope Innocent X in 1650.

=== Nuns ===
The Nuns of St Ambrose (Ambrosian Sisters) wore a habit of the same colour as the Brothers of St Ambrose, conformed to their constitutions, and followed the Ambrosian Rite, but were independent in government. Pope Sixtus IV gave the nuns canonical status in 1474. Their one monastery was on the top of Monte Varese, near Lago Maggiore, on the spot where their foundress, the Blessed Catarina Morigia (or Catherine of Palanza), had first led a solitary life. Other early nuns were the Blessed Juliana of Puriselli, Benedetta Bimia, and Lucia Alciata. The nuns were esteemed by St Charles Borromeo.

Another group of cloistered "Nuns of St Ambrose", also called the Annunciatae (Italian: Annunziate) of Lombardy or "Sisters of St Marcellina", were founded in 1408 by three young women of Pavia, Dorothea Morosini, Eleonora Contarini, and Veronica Duodi. Their houses, scattered throughout Lombardy and Venetia, were united into a congregation by St Pius V, under the Rule of St Augustine with a mother-house, residence of the prioress general, at Pavia. One of the nuns in this group was Saint Catharine Fieschi Adorno, who died on September 14, 1510.

=== Oblates of St. Ambrose and of St. Charles ===
In some sense also "Ambrosians" are the members of a diocesan religious society founded by St Charles Borromeo, Archbishop of Milan. All priests or destined to become priests, they took a simple vow of obedience to their bishop. The model for this was a society that already existed at Brescia, under the name of "Priests of Peace". In August 1578 the new society was inaugurated, being entrusted with the church of the Holy Sepulchre and given the name of "Oblates of St. Ambrose." They later received the approbation of Gregory XIII. St Charles died in 1584. These Oblates were dispersed by Napoleon I in 1810, while another group called the Oblates of Our Lady of Rho escaped this fate. In 1848 they were reorganized and given the name of "Oblates of St. Charles" and reassigned the house of the Holy Sepulchre. In the course of the 19th century similar groups were founded in a number of countries, including the "Oblates of St Charles", established in London by Cardinal Nicholas Wiseman.

== See also ==
- St. Ambrose University
