= General Intercessions =

Christian liturgical prayers

The General Intercessions or Universal Prayer or Prayer of the Faithful are a series of prayers which form part of the liturgy in the Catholic, Lutheran, Anglican, Methodist and other Western Liturgical Churches. Such formulae are found in the oldest of Divine Liturgy forms in the Greek church, such as the liturgy of Saint John Chrysostom, as well as in the Catholic liturgies of the early Gallican Rite, and pre-Reformation England.

== History ==
The Christian custom of offering such prayers, perhaps in line with Jewish tradition, is rooted in Scripture:

First of all, then, I urge that supplications, prayers, intercessions, and thanksgivings be made for all men, for kings and all who are in high positions, that we may lead a quiet and peaceable life, godly and respectful in every way. This is good, and it is acceptable in the sight of God our Saviour, who desires all men to be saved and to come to the knowledge of the truth. For there is one God, and there is one mediator between God and men, the man Christ Jesus, who gave himself as a ransom for all, the testimony to which was borne at the proper time.

— 1 Timothy 2:1–6

The practice is witnessed to by Justin Martyr and Augustine of Hippo, and by the fourth century, the Roman Rite had a set of nine Solemn Prayers of Intercession of the kind now preserved only on Good Friday at the same point in the liturgy at which the ordinary General Intercessions are prayed.

The General Intercessions dropped out of use, leaving only the introductory greeting "Dominus vobiscum" and the invitation "Oremus" (followed by no particular prayer) which, in the Tridentine Mass, the priest said when about to begin the Offertory. They were one of the elements that the Second Vatican Council referred to when decreeing in Sacrosanctum Concilium, the Constitution on the Sacred Liturgy, that "other parts which suffered loss through accidents of history are to be restored to the vigour they had in the days of the holy Fathers, as may seem useful or necessary". Specifically, the Constitution called for "the common prayer" or "the prayer of the faithful" to be restored:

By this prayer, in which the people are to take part, intercession will be made for holy Church, for the civil authorities, for those oppressed by various needs, for all mankind, and for the salvation of the entire world.

In the Ambrosian Rite, the prayer of the faithful had been in vigour for some occasions also before the Second Vatican Council, with the Ambrosian chant for the offertory Dicamus omnes.

== Practice by Christian denomination ==
=== Catholicism ===
This prayer is said at the conclusion of the Liturgy of the Word or Mass of the Catechumens (the older term). The General Instruction of the Roman Missal states:

In the General Intercessions or the Prayer of the Faithful, the people respond in a certain way to the word of God which they have welcomed in faith and, exercising the office of their baptismal priesthood, offer prayers to God for the salvation of all. It is fitting that such a prayer be included, as a rule, in Masses celebrated with a congregation, so that petitions will be offered for the holy Church, for civil authorities, for those weighed down by various needs, for all men and women, and for the salvation of the whole world.

The prayer is introduced by the celebrating priest. A deacon, another member of the congregation, or the priest himself recites a number of intentions, and the people respond with a short invocation such as "Lord, hear our prayer." The prayer is concluded with a final oration by the priest and all responding "Amen".

=== Anglicanism and Methodism ===
A bidding-prayer (Old English: biddan, "to pray", cf. German: beten) is the formula of prayer, or exhortation to prayer, said during worship in churches of the Anglican Communion. It occurs during the liturgy of the word, following the sermon.

The form varies, but the characteristic feature is that the minister tells the people what to pray for. For example, the form for the bidding-prayer in the 1662 Book of Common Prayer begins, "Let us pray for the whole state of Christ's Church militant here in earth" (although this is an adaption of the former Canon of the Catholic Mass). The bidding-prayer is an informal intercessory prayer, covering a wide variety of concerns such as the church, the state, the living and the dead, and public and private necessities. In England in the 16th century, it took the form of a direction to the people what to remember in telling their beads. In the course of time, the word bid, in the sense of pray, became obsolete and was confused with bid in the sense of command (from Old English: beodan, 'to offer, present', and hence 'to announce, or command'; cf. German: bieten, 'to offer' gebieten, 'to command'). Hence, the term bidding-prayer evolved to mean, in practice, the exhortation to pray, instead of the prayer itself. A form of exhortation which preachers and ministers shall move the people to join with them in prayer is given in the 55th canon of the Church of England (1603).

The terms intercessory prayers and prayers of the people are also commonly used for bidding-prayers. In keeping with Anglican custom, these are still said according to one or more Prayer Book templates, but are generally designed in such a way that specific topical, seasonal, or cyclical petitions can be added. On occasion, the person leading the prayers will still introduce each petition with the phrase, "I bid your prayers for..."

A bidding prayer is offered at the beginning of the Festival of Nine Lessons and Carols observed at King's College, Cambridge University, on Christmas Eve; this prayer has been heard annually in radio broadcasts of the Festival since the 1930s. It is included in various Anglican and Methodist worship books and has been subtly, but importantly, revised several times in its history, including to reflect the concerns raised by the COVID-19 pandemic and the Gaza war.

=== Lutheran ===
Lutheran church services also include "prayers of intercession" or "prayers of the people".

== Use in the praying of the canonical hours ==
Similar sets of prayers are said in the Liturgy of the Hours after the canticles of the Benedictus and the Magnificat at Lauds and Vespers (Morning and Evening Prayer). Referred to as the Intercessions, they are similarly introduced by an introductory phrase, but end with the recitation of the Lord's Prayer before the person presiding over the celebration recites the concluding prayer.

== See also ==
- Jesus Prayer
- Book of Common Prayer
- List of prayers
- Prayers of the faithful, the intercessory prayers used in Catholic liturgy
