= Armenian Gospel with Silver Cover =

Armenian-made illuminated gospel created in the 13th and 17th centuries

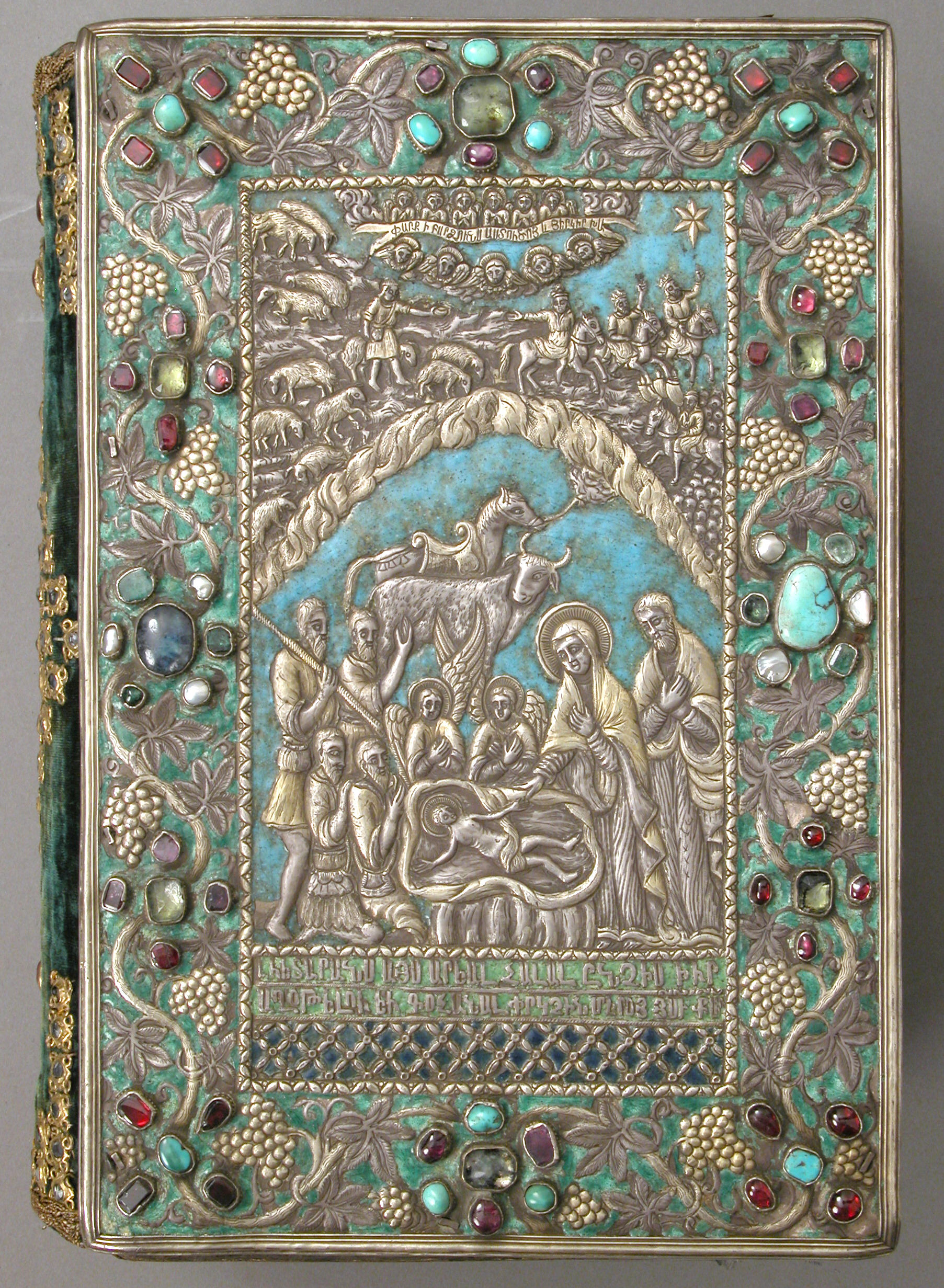
- Artist: Astuatsatur Shahamir
- Year: c. 13th-17th century
- Medium: Ink and tempera on parchment with a cover of silver, gilt, jewels, enamel
- Dimensions: 25.4 cm × 17.1 cm (10.0 in × 6.7 in)
- Location: Metropolitan Museum of Art, New York

The Metropolitan Museum of Art holds an Armenian-made illuminated gospel in its collection. Created in the 13th and 17th centuries, the gospel features elaborately executed metalwork decorations, and is adorned with gems and enamel.

== Description ==
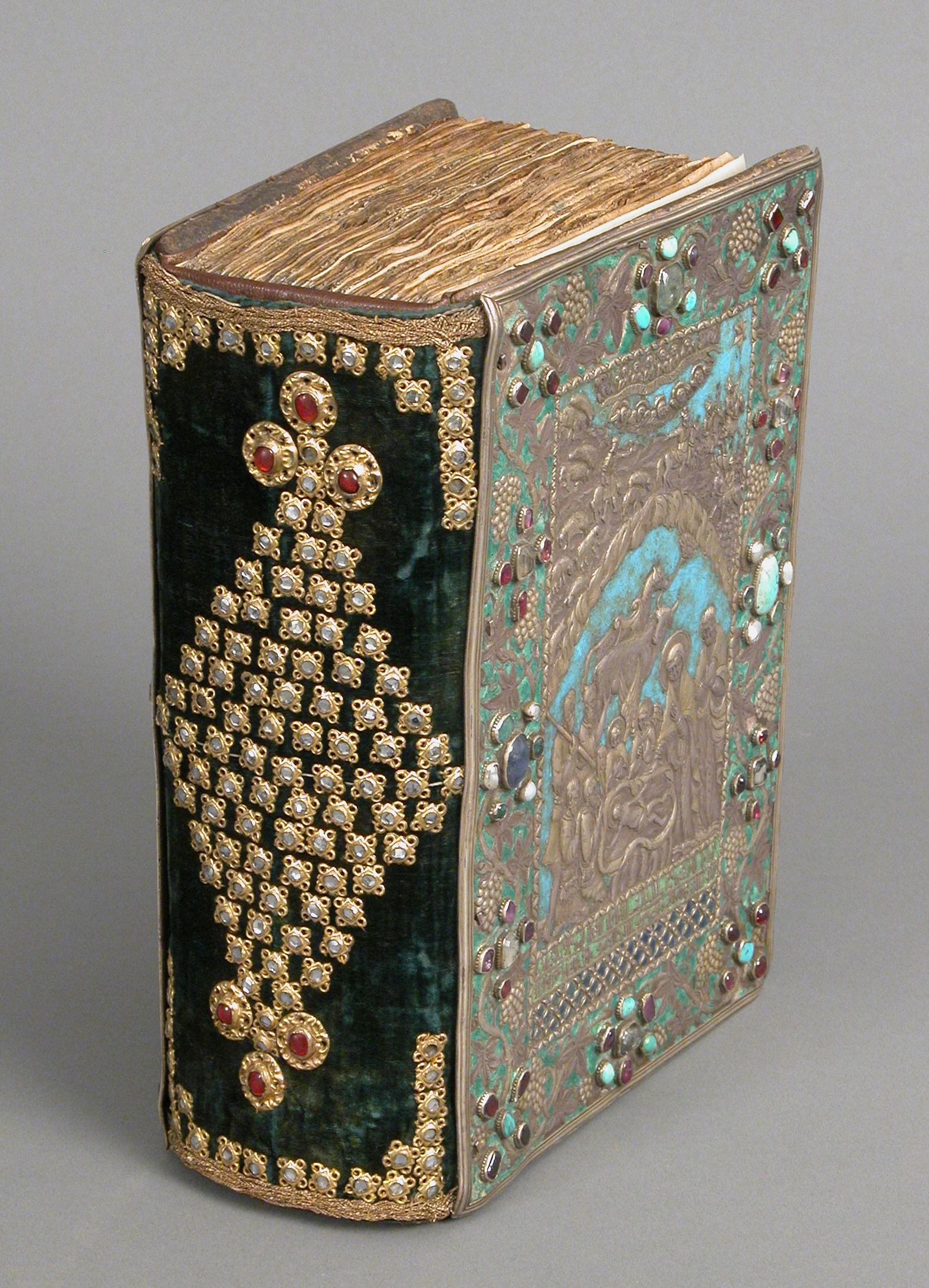

The gospel was created in two parts; the book itself dates to the 13th century, while the elaborate metalwork cover and accompanying adornments are attributable to the 17th century. The design used on the front plaque of the book, depicting the Nativity and the Adoration of the Shepherds, is directly inspired by the work of Dutch woodcutter Christoffel van Sichem. The metalwork itself was produced in Kayseri, Turkey.

== See also ==
- Reliquary Cross with Relics of Saint George
