= Ambrosian Rite =

Liturgical rite of the Archdiocese of Milan

The Ambrosian Rite (Italian: Rito Ambrosiano) is a Latin liturgical rite of the Catholic Church and the Eastern Orthodox Church (specifically The Divine Liturgy of Saint Ambrose). The rite is named after Saint Ambrose, a bishop of Milan in the fourth century. It is used by around five million Catholics in the greater part of the Archdiocese of Milan (excluding Monza, Treviglio and Trezzo sull'Adda), in some parishes of the Diocese of Como, Bergamo, Novara, Lodi, in the Diocese of Lugano, Canton of Ticino, Switzerland, less prominently in some Western Rite orthodox parishes and on special occasions of other jurisdictions.

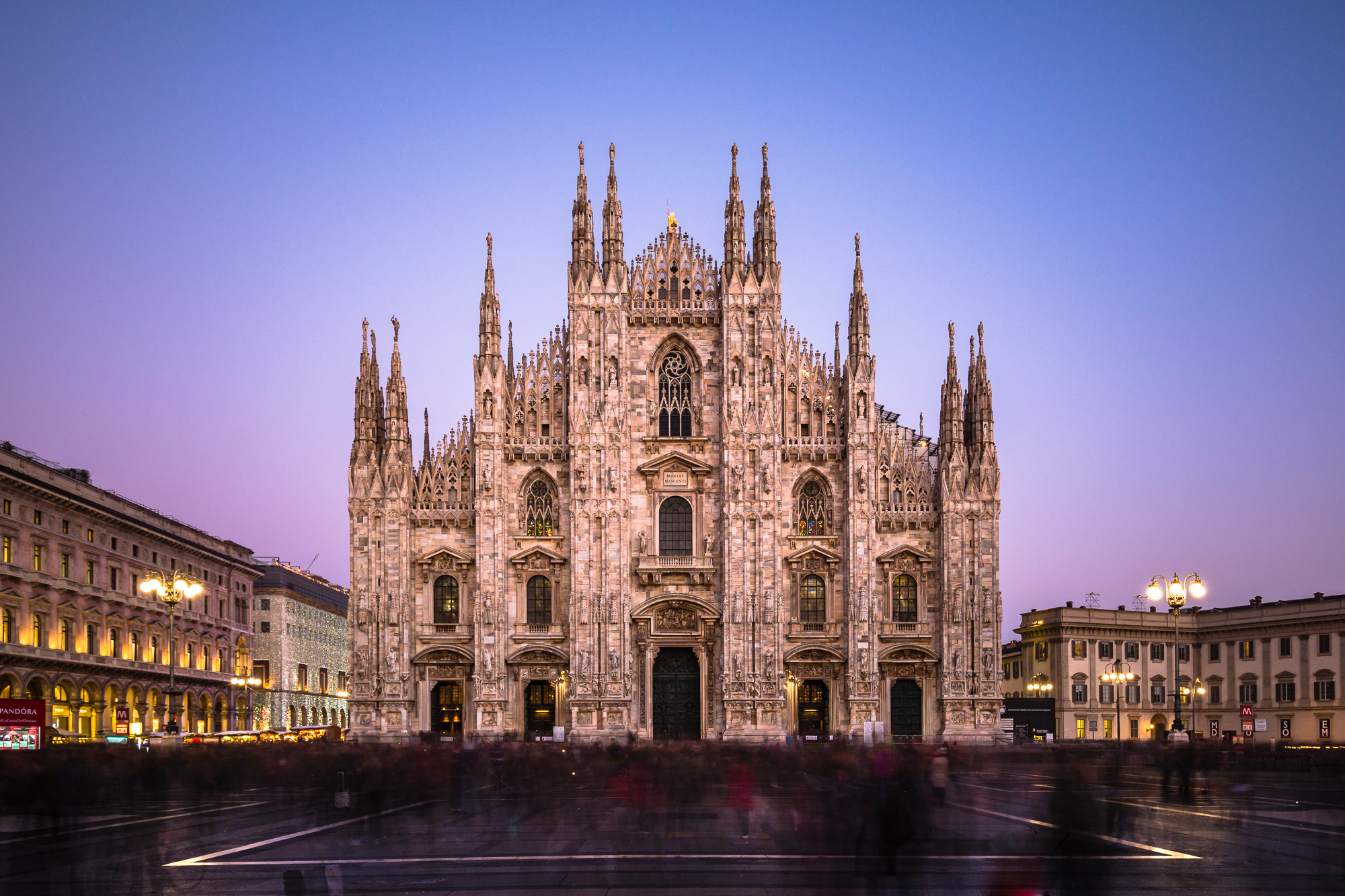
Milan Cathedral, mother church of all Ambrosian Christians

The Ambrosian Rite has risked suppression at various points in its history. It was reformed after the Second Vatican Council (Pope Paul VI belonged to the Ambrosian Rite, having previously been Archbishop of Milan). In the 20th century, it also gained prominence and prestige from the attentions of two other scholarly Archbishops of Milan: Achille Ratti, later Pope Pius XI, and Cardinal Ildefonso Schuster, both of whom were involved in studies and publications on the rite.

== History ==
Diffusion of the Ambrosian Rite

The Church of Milan's own liturgy is named Ambrosian after its patron saint Ambrose. The Ambrosian Rite evolved and developed from the 4th century onwards. There is no direct evidence that the rite was the composition of St. Ambrose, but his name has been associated with it since the 8th century. It is possible that Ambrose, who succeeded the Arian bishop Auxentius of Milan, may have removed material seen as unorthodox by the mainstream church and issued corrected service books which included the principal characteristics distinguishing it from other rites.

According to St. Augustine (Confessiones, IX, vii) and Paulinus the Deacon (Vita S. Ambrosii, § 13), St. Ambrose introduced innovations, not indeed into the Mass, but into what would seem to be the Divine Office, at the time of his contest with the Empress Justina, for the Portian Basilica which she claimed for the Arians. St. Ambrose filled the church with Catholics and kept them there night and day until the peril was past. And he arranged Psalms and hymns for them to sing, as St. Augustine says, "after the manner of the Orientals, lest the people should languish in cheerless monotony"; and of this Paulinus the deacon says: "Now for the first time antiphons, hymns, and vigils began to be part of the observance of the Church in Milan, which devout observance lasts to our day not only in that church but in nearly every province of the West".

From the time of St. Ambrose, whose hymns are well-known and whose liturgical allusions may certainly be explained as referring to a rite which possessed the characteristics of that which is called by his name, until the period of Charlemagne (circa AD 800), there is a gap in the history of the Milanese Rite. However, St. Simplician, the successor of St. Ambrose, added much to the rite and St. Lazarus (438–451) introduced the three days of the litanies (Cantù, Milano e il suo territorio, I, 116). The Church of Milan underwent various vicissitudes and for a period of some eighty years (570–649), during the Lombard conquests, the see was moved to Genoa in Liguria.

In the eighth century, manuscript evidence begins. In a short treatise on the various cursus entitled "Ratio de Cursus qui fuerunt ex auctores" (sic in Cotton Manuscripts, Nero A. II, in the British Library), written about the middle of the eighth century, probably by an Irish monk in France, is found perhaps the earliest attribution of the Milan use to St. Ambrose, though it quotes the authority of St. Augustine, probably alluding to the passage already mentioned: "There is yet another Cursus which the blessed Bishop Augustine says that the blessed Ambrose composed because of the existence of a different use of the heretics, which previously used to be sung in Italy".

According to a narrative of Landulphus Senior, the eleventh-century chronicler of Milan, Charlemagne attempted to abolish the Ambrosian Rite, as he or his father, Pepin the Short, had abolished the Gallican Rite in France, in favour of a Gallicanized Roman Rite. He sent to Milan and caused to be destroyed or sent beyond the mountain, quasi in exilium (as if into exile), all the Ambrosian books which could be found. Eugenius the Bishop, (transmontane bishop, as Landulf calls him), begged him to reconsider his decision. After the manner of the time, an ordeal, which reminds one of the celebrated trials by fire and by battle in the case of Alfonso VI and the Mozarabic Rite, was determined on. Two books, Ambrosian and Roman, were laid closed upon the altar of St. Peter's Church in Rome and left for three days, and the one which was found open was to win. They were both found open, and it was resolved that as God had shown that one was as acceptable as the other, the Ambrosian Rite should continue. But the destruction had been so far effective that no Ambrosian books could be found, save one missal which a faithful priest had hidden for six weeks in a cave in the mountains. Therefore the Manuale was written out from memory by certain priests and clerks (Landulph, Chron., 10–13). Walafridus Strabo, who died Abbot of Reichenau in 849, and must therefore have been nearly, if not quite, contemporary with this incident, says nothing about it, but (De Rebus Ecclesiasticis, xxii), speaking of various forms of the Mass, says: "Ambrose, Bishop of Milan, also arranged a ceremonial for the Mass and other offices for his own church and for other parts of Liguria, which is still observed in the Milanese Church".

In the eleventh century Pope Nicholas II, who in 1060 had tried to abolish the Mozarabic Rite, wished also to attack the Ambrosian and was aided by St. Peter Damian but he was unsuccessful, and Pope Alexander II his successor, himself a Milanese, reversed his policy in this respect. St. Gregory VII made another attempt, and Le Brun (Explication de la Messe, III, art. I, § 8) conjectures that Landulf's miraculous narrative was written with a purpose about that time. Having weathered these storms, the Ambrosian Rite had peace for some three centuries and a half.

In the first half of the fifteenth century Cardinal Branda da Castiglione, who died in 1448, was legate in Milan. As part of his plan for reconciling Filippo Maria Visconti, Duke of Milan, and the Holy See, he endeavoured to substitute the Roman Rite for the Ambrosian. The result was a serious riot, and the Cardinal's legateship came to an abrupt end. After that, the Ambrosian Rite was safe until the Council of Trent. The Rule of that Council, that local uses which could show a prescription of two centuries might be retained, saved Milan, not without a struggle, from the loss of its Rite, and St. Charles Borromeo though he made some alterations in a Roman direction, was most careful not to destroy its characteristics. A small attempt made against it by a Governor of Milan who had obtained permission from the Pope to have the Roman Mass said in any church which he might happen to attend, was defeated by St. Charles, and his own revisions were intended to do little more than was inevitable in a living rite.

Since his time the temper of the Milan Church has been most conservative, and the only alterations in subsequent editions seem to have been slight improvements in the wording of rubrics and in the arrangement of the books. The district in which the Ambrosian Rite is used is nominally the old archepiscopal province of Milan before the changes of 1515 and 1819, but actually, it is not exclusively used even in the city of Milan itself. In parts of the Swiss Canton of Ticino, it is used; in other parts, the Roman Rite is so much preferred that it is said that when Cardinal Gaisruck tried to force the Ambrosian upon them the inhabitants declared that they would be either Roman or Lutheran. There are traces also of the use of the Ambrosian Rite beyond the limits of the Province of Milan. In 1132–1134, two Augustinian canons of Ratisbon, Paul, said by Bäumer to be Paul of Bernried, and Gebehard, held a correspondence with Anselm, Archbishop of Milan, and Martin, treasurer of St. Ambrose, with a view of obtaining copies of the books of the Ambrosian Rite, so that they might introduce it into their church. In the fourteenth century, the Emperor Charles IV introduced the Rite into the Church of St. Ambrose at Prague. Traces of it, mixed with the Roman, are said by Hoeyinck (Geschichte der kirchl. Liturgie des Bisthums Augsburg) to have remained in the diocese of Augsburg down to its last breviary of 1584, and according to Catena (Cantù, Milano e il suo territorio, 118) the use of Capua in the time of St. Charles Borromeo had some resemblance to that of Milan.

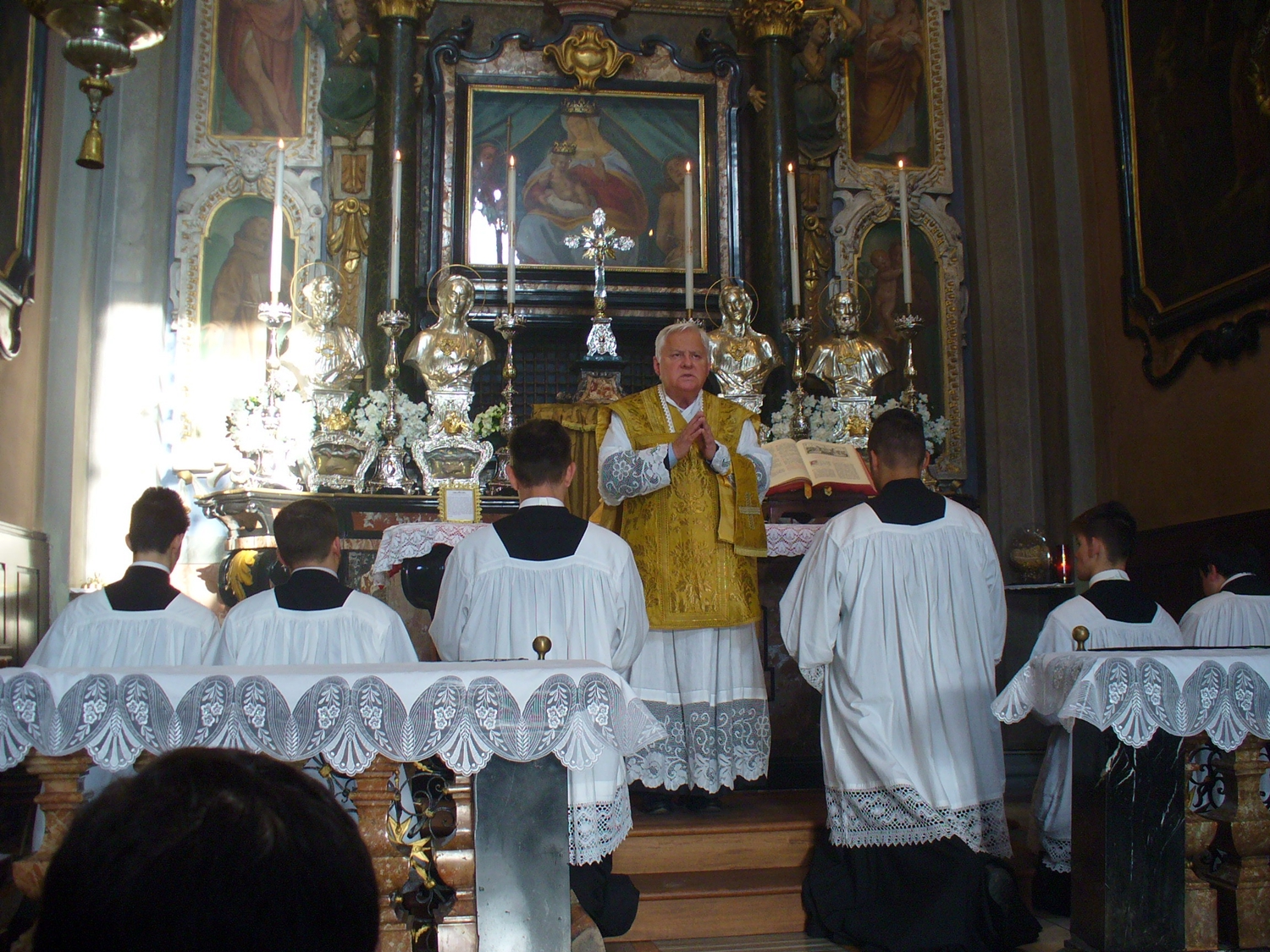
An Ambrosian Rite Mass being celebrated in the Church of the Nativity of the Blessed Virgin Mary, Legnano

Important editions of the Ambrosian Missal were issued in 1475, 1594, 1609, 1902 and 1954. The last of these was the final edition in the form of the Ambrosian Rite that preceded the Second Vatican Council and is now used mainly in the church of Santa Maria della Consolazione in Milan.

Following the guidelines of the Second Vatican Council and the preliminary revisions of the Ordinary of the Mass of the Roman Rite, a new bilingual (Latin and Italian) edition of the Ambrosian Missal was issued in 1966, simplifying the 1954 missal, mainly in the prayers the priest said inaudibly and in the genuflections, and adding the Prayer of the Faithful. The Eucharistic prayer continued to be said in Latin until 1967. The altars were moved to face the people.

When the Mass of Paul VI was issued in 1969, most Ambrosian-Rite priests began to use the new Roman Missal (only omitting the Agnus Dei), the Roman Lectionary, and the General Roman Calendar (with its four-week Advent). The Ambrosian form of administering the other sacraments was for the most part already identical with the Roman. This made it uncertain whether the Ambrosian Rite would survive. But in promulgating the documents of the 46th diocesan synod (1966–1973), Cardinal Archbishop Giovanni Colombo, supported by Pope Paul VI (a former Archbishop of Milan), finally decreed that the Ambrosian Rite, brought into line with the directives of the Second Vatican Council, should be preserved.

Work, still in progress, began on all the Ambrosian liturgical texts. On 11 April 1976, Cardinal Colombo published the new Ambrosian Missal, covering the whole liturgical year. Later in the same year an experimental Lectionary appeared, covering only some liturgical seasons, and still following the Roman-Rite Lectionary for the rest. Minor modifications of the Ambrosian Missal were implemented in 1978, restoring for example the place of the Creed in the Mass, and the new Ambrosian rite for funerals was issued.

The Ambrosian Missal also restored two early-medieval Ambrosian Eucharistic prayers, unusual for placing the epiclesis after the Words of Institution, in line with Oriental use. The new and revised edition of the Ambrosian Missal was issued to be published by archbishop Mario Enrico Delpini in 2024 on the First Sunday of Advent, restoring some peculiar prayers and rites as they were contained in the 1954 editio typica.

In 1984–1985 the new Ambrosian Liturgy of the Hours was published and in 2006 the new Ambrosian rite of marriage. On 20 March 2008 the new Ambrosian Lectionary, superseding the 1976 experimental edition, and covering the whole liturgical year, was promulgated, coming into effect from the First Sunday of Advent 2008 (16 November 2008). It is based on the ancient Ambrosian liturgical tradition and contains in particular, a special rite of light ("lucernarium") and proclamation of the resurrection of Jesus, for use before the Saturday-evening celebration of the Mass of the Sunday, seen as the weekly Easter. Pope John Paul II celebrated Mass in Milan using the Ambrosian Rite in 1983, as did Pope Francis in 2017.

== Origin ==
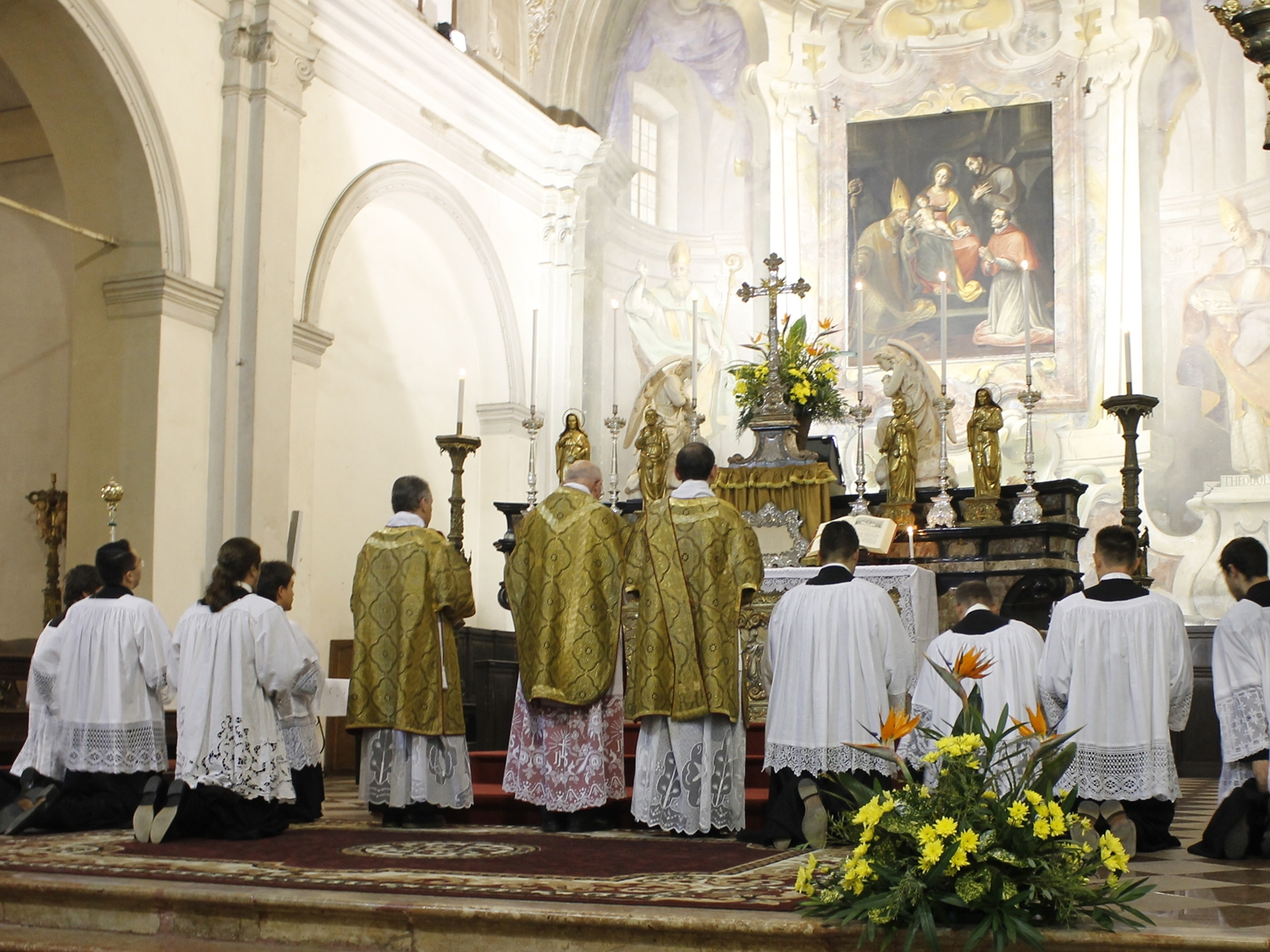
A solemn Mass celebrated in the Ambrosian Rite using the 1954 Missal (pre-Vatican II) in the church of its patron, Saint Ambrose, Legnano

The Catholic Encyclopedia of 1907 gives three theories of the ancient origin of the rite, none conclusive. The question resolves itself into whether the Ambrosian Rite is archaic Roman or a much-Romanized form of the Gallican Rite.

J. M. Neale and others from the Anglican tradition referred the Hispano-Gallican and Celtic family of liturgies to an original imported into Provence from Ephesus in Asia Minor by St. Irenæus, who had received it through St. Polycarp from St. John the Divine. The name Ephesine was applied to this liturgy, and it was sometimes called the Liturgy of St. John. In support of this theory, Colman, at the Synod of Whitby in 664, attributed the Celtic rule of Easter to St. John. But Neale greatly exaggerated the Romanizing effected by St. Charles Borromeo. W. C. Bishop, however, in his article on the Ambrosian Breviary, takes up the same line as Neale in claiming a Gallican origin for the Ambrosian Divine Office.

Louis Duchesne in his "Origines du culte chrétien" theorizes that the rite was imported or modified from the East, perhaps by the Cappadocian Arian Bishop Auxentius (355–374), the predecessor of St. Ambrose, and gradually spread to Gaul, Spain, and Britain. Jungmann later concluded that "Duchesne's thesis can be accepted in the sense that Milan was the centre from which a Gallican type liturgy took its origin." Here, "Gallican" means a Latin (not Eastern) liturgy somewhat different from that of Rome.

Antonio Maria Ceriani and Magistretti maintain that the Ambrosian Rite has preserved the pre-Gelasian and pre-Gregorian form of the Roman Rite.

== Differences from the Roman Rite ==
Some features of the Ambrosian Rite distinguish it from the Roman Rite liturgy.

=== Mass ===
The main differences in the Mass are:

- The cross with the crucifix is always facing the celebrant while processing (in the Roman Rite it faces the congregation).
- During solemnities, the initial procession stops at the footsteps of the Sanctuary and so-called XII Kyrie are sung twelve times. Then an Ambrosian antiphon called Psallenda (different for each feast) is sung twice, with Gloria Patri-Sicut erat in between. During the Gloria Patri verse, all the acolytes bow to the cross, while during the Sicut erat verse all bow to the celebrant. Only at this time, they enter the Sanctuary and the Mass begins.
- The principal celebrant blesses all the readers, not only the deacon. The reader asks for the blessing saying to the priest: "Bless me, father". Then, while tracing the sign of the cross, the main celebrant tells the reader: "Read in the name of the Lord".
- During the Mass, four prayers are said: Prayer over the people (oratio super populum), Prayer over the altar shroud (oratio super sindonem), Prayer over the Gifts (oratio super oblatam) and Prayer after the communion (oratio post communionem). In traditional Ambrosian Rite the celebrant always faces the altar in front of the missal when he said "Dominus vobiscum".
- The initial antiphon is called Ingressa and has not the form of the roman Introitus (i.e. antiphon, psalm, Gloria, antiphon). The only example of Ingressa equal to roman Introitus is "Requiem aeternam" during the Mass of the Dead.
- The Gospel is followed by an antiphon called Post Evangelium (absent in the Roman Rite).
- The Rite of Peace comes before the Presentation of the Gifts, according to what Jesus says in the Gospel of Matthew (5:23-24): "Therefore if you bring your gift to the altar, and there remember that your brother has something against you, leave your gift there before the altar, and go your way. First be reconciled to your brother, and then come and offer your gift".
- During the presentation of the Gifts, no "Orate, fratres" (pray brothers and sisters) is said as it happens in the Roman rite.
- The Creed follows the Preparation of the Gifts, before the Prayer over the Gifts.
- There are some differences between the First Eucharistic Prayer of the Ambrosian Missal and the Roman Canon, the first in the Roman Missal; but its Eucharistic Prayers II, III, and IV are the same as in the Roman Rite. In addition, the Ambrosian Rite has two proper Eucharistic Prayers, used mainly on Easter and Holy Thursday. In traditional Ambrosian Rite, the celebrant washed his hands right before the Consecration, no Lavabo inter innocentes was said.
- The priest breaks the Host and places a piece in the main chalice before the Lord's Prayer, while an antiphon (the Confractorium) is sung or recited.
- The Agnus Dei is not said (in the traditional Ambrosian rite Agnus Dei was said or sung only at the Mass for the Dead).
- Before the final blessing, the people say Kyrie, eleison ("Lord, have mercy") three times (in the traditional Ambrosian Rite Kyrie, eleison were repeated always three times after each "Dominus vobiscum" which was not followed by a prayer and at the end of Gloria in excelsis Deo).
- At the end of the Mass, instead of saying "The Mass is ended, go in peace" (Ite, missa est) the priest says simply "Go in peace" ("Procedamus cum pace"), to which the people respond "In the name of Christ" ("In nomine Christi").
- The Ambrosian Rite has its own cycle of readings at Mass.
- Many of the prayers said by the priest during Mass are peculiar to the Ambrosian Rite. Prefaces are all proper for each feast (there are no common prefaces).

=== Liturgical year ===
The main differences in the liturgical year are:

- Advent and Lent have both six weeks (Roman Advent has four weeks). On the sixth Sunday of Advent the solemnity of the Divine Maternity of the Virgin Mary is celebrated (white vestments).
- Lent starts with the first Sunday (four days later than in the Roman Rite), no Ash Wednesday is celebrated and Carnival continues until "Fat Saturday" ("sabato grasso" in Italian), corresponding to Shrove Tuesday (called "Mardi Gras", i.e. "Fat Tuesday", in French) in areas where the Roman Rite is used. Before St. Charles Borromeo, the First Sunday of Lent called "the Sunday head of Lent" (Dominica in capite Quadragesimae) was a solemn feast celebrated with white vestments and Gloria in excelsis Deo and Alleluja were sung. In particular this hallelujatic verse was the longest of the whole Ambrosian chant repertoire and now survived as a Cantus (the equivalent of the roman Tractus). The Alleluja were sung until the second vespers, when a solemn antiphon commonly called the farewell to Alleluja was sung ("Quadraginta dies et noctes aperti sunt caeli, et omnes animae habentes spiritum vitae ingressae sunt in arca, et clausa est, hallelujah" – For forty days and nights the heavens were open and all souls having the spirit of life entered into the ark, and it closed, alleluja). After Borromeo's liturgical reform, First Sunday of Lent is celebrated with violet vestments and neither Gloria in excelsis nor Alleluja are sung. Since Ash Wednesday is absent, fasting and abstinence are postponed until the first Friday of Lent. In replacement of Gloria in excelsis, a litany is sung according to two distinct formulas for odd and even Sundays, "Divinae pacis" and "Dicamus omnes" respectively. Also Sundays of Lent are different and take the name from the Gospel's reading:
  - First Sunday – in capite Quadragesimae (temptations in the desert),
  - Second Sunday – de Samaritana,
  - Third Sunday – de Abraham,
  - Fourth Sunday – de Caeco,
  - Fifth Sunday – de Lazaro.
- On Fridays in Lent, Mass is not celebrated and, with a few exceptions, Communion is not distributed. In substitution of the Mass, the prayer of Via Crucis takes place.
- Liturgical colours throughout the year are different from the Roman Rite. For example, in the Ambrosian Rite red is the Eucharistic colour and the standard colour of vestments from Pentecost to the third Sunday of October (solemnity of the Dedication of the Cathedral), rather than the green used in the Roman Rite. No violet is used in Ambrosian rite during Advent and Lent, but a brown-nuance called "morello" (i.e. blackberry colour, similar to prune). Black vestments are used during the ordinary days of Lent (feriae). Rose vestments are absent for Laetare and Gaudete Sundays. Green is used for the whole period after the Epiphany and during the liturgical period between the Dedication of the Cathedral and Advent. During Easter, white vestments are used on the Holy Saturday, on Sunday of Resurrection and for the whole week in albis. Afterwards, starting from the first Sunday after Easter called in albis depositis, white vestments are set down literally and green vestments are used. After the liturgical reform of 1969, all Easter Sundays are celebrated with white vestments as in the Roman Rite.
- The Holy Week is called the Authentic Week (in Authentica) and starts with the Palm Sundays. Red vestments are used for all celebrations, also for Maundy Thursday. The Good Friday celebration remembers the Passion and Death of the Lord on the cross with the readings from the Old and New Testament, followed by the worship of the cross.
- After the Sunday of Ascension, three days of penance called Minor Rogations from Monday to Wednesday (called litaniae triduane meaning three days of rogations) prepare for the solemnity of Pentecost, following the words of Jesus "The days will come when the bridegroom is taken away from them, and then they will fast" (Mt 9:14-15). Before the Liturgical reform of 1969, this was the moment in which ashes were sprinkled to worshippers. After 1969, to maintain the distinction with Roman Rite ashes are sprinkled on the first Monday of Lent – i.e. the day after the First Sunday of Lent.

=== Other ===
Other differences are that:

- The Liturgy of the Hours (also known as the Divine Office or Breviary) is different in structure and in various features.
- The liturgical rites of Holy Week are quite different.
- The rite of funerals is different.
- Baptism of infants is done by triple immersion of the head.
- The thurible has no top cover, is lighter and is swung in anti-clockwise before the censing of a person or object, then three times in clockwise (ductus) and in front (tractus), thus to shape the sign of a cross.
- Ambrosian deacons wear the stole over the dalmatic and not under it.
- The Ambrosian cassock, buttoned with only five buttons below the neck, is held with a fascia at the waist, and is worn with a round white collar.
- Ambrosian chant is distinct from Gregorian chant.
- Some senior priests (notably provosts and certain canons) are entitled to wear vestments commonly associated with bishops, including the mitre.
- A liturgical privilege of the Archbishop of Milan is to sing Vespers wearing the chasuble in place of the cope.
- The liturgical burning of the faro (a large cotton sphere suspended in the air, inside the church) on feasts of martyrs to remind the offer of their lifes to God.

== Early manuscripts ==
The early manuscripts of the Ambrosian Rite are generally found in the following forms:

- The "Sacramentary" contains the Orationes super Populum, Prophecies, Epistles, Gospels, Orationes super Sindonem, and Orationes super Oblata, the Prefaces and Post-Communions throughout the year, with the variable forms of the Communicantes and Hanc igitur, when they occur, and the solitary Post Sanctus of Easter Eve, besides the ceremonies of Holy Week, etc., and the Ordinary and Canon of the Mass. There are often also occasional offices usually found in a modern ritual, such as Baptism, the Visitation and Unction of the Sick, the Burial of the Dead, and various benedictions. It is essentially a priest's book, like the Euchologion of the Greeks.
- The "Psalter" contains the Psalms and Canticles. It is sometimes included with the "Manual".
- The "Manual" is nearly the complement of the "Sacramentary" and the "Psalter" as regards both the Mass and the Divine Office. It contains for the Divine Office: the Lucernaria, Antiphons, Responsoria, Psallenda, Completoria, Capitula, Hymns, and other changeable parts, except the Lessons, which are found separately. And for the Mass, it contains the Ingressœ, Psalmellœ, Versus, Cantus, Antiphonœ ante and post Evangelium, Offertoria, Confractoria, and Transitoria. The "Manual" often also contains occasional services such as are now usually found in a Ritual.
- The "Antiphoner" is a Manual with notes.
- The "Rituale" and "Pontificale" have contents similar to those of Roman books of the same name, though the early Manuscripts are less ample.

=== Sacramentaries and missals ===
The following are some of the most noted Manuscripts of the rite:

- The "Biasca Sacramentary"; Bibl. Ambros., A. 24, bis inf., late ninth or early tenth century. Described by Delisle, "Anc. Sacr.", LXXI, edited by Ceriani in his "Monumenta Sacra et Profana", VIII, the Ordinary is analyzed and the Canon is given in full in Ceriani's "Notitia Lit. Ambr".
- The "Lodrino Sacramentary"; Bibl. Ambr., A. 24, inf., eleventh century. Delisle, "Anc. Sacr.", LXXII.
- The "Sacramentary of San Satiro", Milan; treasury of Milan Cathedral; eleventh century. Delisle, "Anc. Sacr.", LXXIII.
- Sacramentary; treasury of Milan Cathedral; eleventh century. Delisle, "Anc. Sacr.", LXXIV.
- The "Sacramentary of Armio", near the Lago Maggiore; treasury of Milan Cathedral; eleventh century. Delisle, 'Anc. Sacr.", LXXV.
- Sacramentary belonging to the Marchese Trotti; eleventh century. Delisle, "Anc. Sacr.", LXXVI.
- Sacramentary; Bibl. Ambros., CXX, sup., eleventh century. Delisle, "Anc. Sacr.", LXXVII.
- The "Bergamo Sacramentary"; library of Sant' Alessandro in Colonna, Bergamo; tenth or eleventh century. Published by the Benedictines of Solesmes, "Auctarium Solesmense" (to Migne's Patrologia), "Series Liturgica", I.
- Sacramentary; treasury of Monza Cathedral; tenth century. Delisle, "Anc. Sacr.", LXV.
- "Sacramentary of San Michele di Venegono inferiore" (near Varese); treasury of Monza Cathedral; eleventh century. Delisle, "Anc. Sacr.", LXVIII. These two of Monza Cathedral are more fully described in Frisi's "Memorie storiche di Monza", III,75–77, 82–84.
- "Missale Ambrosianum", of Bedero (near Luino); Bibl. Ambr., D., 87 inf.; twelfth century. Noted by Magistretti in "Della nuova edizione tipica del messale Ambrosiano".

=== Antiphoner ===
- Antiphoner: "Antiphonarium Ambrosianum"; British Museum, Add. Manuscripts, 34,209; twelfth century; published by the Benedictines of Solesmes, with a complete facsimile and 200 pages of introduction by Paul Cagin, in "Paléographie musicale", V, VI.

=== Manuals ===
- "Manual of Lodrino;" Bibl. Ambr., SH. IV, 44; tenth or eleventh century. Imperfect. Described by Magistretti, "Mon. Vet. Lit. Amb.", II, 18.
- "Manuale Ambrosianum" belonging to the Marchese Trotti; tenth or eleventh century. Imperfect. Magistretti, "Mon. Vet. Lit. Amb.", II, 19.
- "Manuale Ambrosianum"; Bibl. Ambr., CIII, sup.; tenth or eleventh century. Imperfect. Magistretti, "Mon. Vet. Lit. Amb.", II, 20.
- "Manuale Ambrosianum"; from the Church of Cernusco (between Monza and Lecco); Bibl. Ambr., I, 55, sup.; eleventh century. Magistretti, "Mon. Vet. Lit. Amb.", II, 28.
- "Manuale Ambrosianum"; from the Church of San Vittore al Teatro, Milan; Bibl. Ambr., A, 1, inf.; twelfth century. Magistretti, "Mon. Vet. Lit. Amb.", II, 22.
- "Manuale Ambrosianum"; from the Church of Brivio (near the Lecco end of the Lake of Como); Bibl. Ambr., I, 27, sup.; twelfth century. Magistretti, "Mon. Vet. Lit. Amb.", II, 30.

=== Rituals ===
- "Liber Monachorum S. Ambrosii"; Bibl. Ambr., XCVI, sup.; eleventh century. Magistretti, "Mon. Vet. Lit. Amb.", II, 33, 79–93.
- "Rituale Ambrosianum", from the Church of S. Laurentiolus in Porta Vercellina, Milan; Sacrar. Metrop., H. 62; thirteenth century. Magistretti, "Mon. Vet. Lit. Amb.", II, 37, 143–171.
- Beroldus Novus"; Chapter Library, Milan; thirteenth century. Magistretti, "Mon. Vet. Lit. Amb.", 17, 94–142.
- "Asti Ritual"; Bibl, Mazarine, 525; tenth century. Described by Gastoué in "Rassegna Gregoriana", 1903. This, though from the old province of Milan, is not Ambrosian, but has bearings on the subject.
- Ceremonial: "Calendarium et Ordines Ecclesiæ Ambrosianæ"; Beroldus; Bibl, Ambr., I, 158, inf. twelfth century. Published by Magistretti, 1894.

=== Pontificals ===
- "Pontificale Mediolanensis Ecclesiæ"; Chapter Library, Milan; ninth century. Printed by Magistretti, "Mon. Vet. Lit. Amb.", I
- "Pontificale Mediolanensis Ecclesiæ"; Chapter Library, Milan; eleventh century. Magistretti, "Mon. Vet. Lit. Amb.", 1, 27.
- "Ordo Ambrosianus ad Consecrandam Ecclesiam et Altare;" Chapter Library, Lucca; eleventh century. Printed by Mercati, "Studi e testi" (of the Vatican Library), 7.

=== Ambrosian service-books ===
Some editions of the printed Ambrosian service-books:

- Missals: (Pre-Borromean) 1475, 1482, 1486, 1488, 1494, 1499, 1505, 1515, 1522, 1548, 1560; (St. Charles Borromeo) 1594; (F. Borromeo) 1609–18; (Monti) 1640; (Litta) 1669; (Fed. Visconti) 1692; (Archinti) 1712; (Pozzobonelli) 1751, 1768; (Fil. Visconti) 1795; (Gaisruck) 1831; (Ferrari) 1902.
- Breviaries: (Pre-Borromean) 1475, 1487, 1490, 1492, 1507, 1513, 1522, and many others; (St. Charles Borromeo), 1582, 1588; (Pozzobonelli) 1760; (Galsruck) 1841; (Romilli) 1857; (Ferrari) 1896, 1902. Rituals: n. d. circ., 1475 (a copy in Bodlwian), 1645, 1736, 1885.
- Psalters: 1486, 1555.
- Ceremonials: 1619, 1831.
- Lectionary: 1660
- Litanies: 1494, 1546, 1667.

The editions of the Missals, 1475, 1751, and 1902; Breviaries, 1582 and 1902; Ritual, 1645; both Psalters, both Ceremonials, the Lectionary, and Litanies are in the British Museum.

== English translations ==
- We Give You Thanks and Praise. The Ambrosian Eucharistic Prefaces. translated by Alan Griffiths, first published by The Canterbury Press, Norwich, (a publishing imprint of Hymn Ancient & Modern Limited, a registered charity) St. Mary's Woods, St. Mary Plain, Norwich, Norfolk. This is an English translation of the two hundred proper prefaces at present used with the Eucharistic prayers of the Ambrosian Rite.
- The Revised Divine Liturgy According to Our Holy Father Ambrose of Milan (Vols 1 and 2). by Bishop Michael Scotto-Daniello and published by Createspace/Amazon. This is a Missalette and a book of Prefaces for the Ambrosian Rite.
- The Divine Liturgy of St. Ambrose, as authorized by the Russian Orthodox Church Outside of Russia.

== See also ==
- Ambrosians
- Rite of the Nivola
