= List of Christian liturgical rites =

The form, purpose, and practice of Christian liturgy varies both between and within various denominations. At the highest level, Christian liturgy can be divided into ritual families comprising rites and uses that encompass the practices of a particular tradition or denomination.

== Western Christianity ==
=== Catholic Church (Western) ===
- Roman Rite, in which the historical forms of the Mass are usually classified as follows:
  - Pre-Tridentine Mass (the various pre-1570 forms)
  - The Tridentine Mass (1570–1969), the 1962 version of which is still permitted as an extraordinary form of the Roman Rite as confirmed by Summorum Pontificum
  - The Mass of Paul VI, since 1970 the ordinary form of the Roman Rite (1970–present)
  - Anglican Use, (in personal ordinariates and Anglican Use parishes)
  - Zaïre Use (in the Democratic Republic of the Congo)
  - Mexican Indigenous Use (in Mexican Indigenous Groups)
- Rite of Lyon (variant of the Roman rite in Lyon, France and neighbouring areas)
- Ambrosian Rite (in Milan, Italy and neighbouring areas)
- Rite of Braga (in Braga, Portugal)
- Mozarabic Rite (in Toledo and Salamanca, Spain)
- Catholic Order Rites
  - Benedictine Rite
  - Carmelite Rite
  - Carthusian Rite
  - Cistercian Rite
  - Dominican Rite
  - Norbertine Rite

Defunct Rites

- African Rite (defunct: Carthage)
- Aquileian Rite (defunct: northeastern Italy)
- Durham Rite (defunct: Durham, England)
- Gallican Rite (defunct: 'Gaul' i.e. France)
- Celtic Rite (defunct: British Isles)
- Sarum Rite (defunct: England)

== Protestant Christianity ==
Historic Protestant Churches have set liturgies, which are referred to as "worship services" or "divine services".

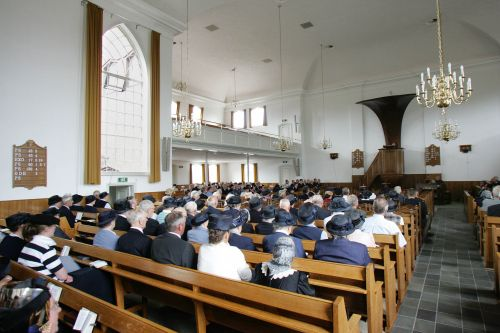
Congregants attend the Divine Service in a Dutch Reformed Church, Doornspijk

=== Reformed Christianity ===
Protestant Reformation-era ministers of the Reformed tradition used set liturgies which emphasized preaching and the Bible. English Puritans and separatists moved away from set forms in the 17th-century, but many Reformed churches retained liturgies and continue to use them today.

=== Lutheranism ===
- Church of Denmark
- Church of Norway
- Church of Sweden
- Church of Finland
- Evangelical Church of the Augsburg Confession in Slovakia
- Slovak Evangelical Church of the Augsburg Confession in Serbia
- Evangelical Lutheran Church in America
- Evangelical Lutheran Church in Canada
- Lutheran Church–Missouri Synod
- Wisconsin Evangelical Lutheran Synod
  - Divine Service

=== Anglicanism ===
At the time of English Reformation, The Sarum Rite was in use along with the Roman Rite. Reformers in England wanted the Latin mass translated into the English language. Archbishop of Canterbury Thomas Cranmer authored the Exhortation and Litany in 1544. This was the earliest English-language service book of the Church of England, and the only English-language service to be finished within the lifetime of King Henry VIII. In 1549, Cranmer produced a complete English-language liturgy. Cranmer was largely responsible for the first two editions of the Book of Common Prayer. The first edition was predominantly pre-Reformation in its outlook. The Communion Service, Lectionary, and collects in the liturgy were translations based on the Sarum Rite as practised in Salisbury Cathedral.

The revised edition in 1552 sought to assert a more clearly Protestant liturgy after problems arose from conservative interpretation of the mass on the one hand, and a critique by Martin Bucer (Butzer) on the other. Successive revisions are based on this edition, though important alterations appeared in 1604 and 1662. The 1662 edition is still authoritative in the Church of England and has served as the basis for many of Books of Common Prayer of national Anglican churches around the world. Those deriving from Scottish Episcopal descent, like the Prayer Books of the American Episcopal Church, have a slightly different liturgical pedigree.

=== Methodistism ===
The Methodist liturgical tradition is based on the Anglican heritage and was passed along to Methodists by John Wesley (an Anglican priest who led the early Methodist movement) who wrote that

there is no Liturgy in the world, either in ancient or modern language, which breathes more of a solid, scriptural, rational piety, than the Common Prayer of the Church of England.

When the Methodists in America were separated from the Church of England, John Wesley himself provided a revised version of the 1662 Book of Common Prayer called The Sunday Service of the Methodists. Wesley's Sunday Service has shaped the official liturgies of the Methodists ever since.

The United Methodist Church has official liturgies for services of Holy Communion, baptism, weddings, funerals, ordination, anointing of the sick for healing, and daily office "praise and prayer" services. Along with these, there are also special services for holy days such as All Saints Day, Ash Wednesday, Maundy Thursday, Good Friday, and Easter Vigil. All of these liturgies and services are contained in The United Methodist Hymnal and The United Methodist Book of Worship (1992). Many of these liturgies are derived from the Anglican tradition's Book of Common Prayer. In most cases, congregations also use other elements of liturgical worship, such as candles, vestments, paraments, banners, and liturgical art.

Because John Wesley advocated outdoor evangelism, revival services are a traditional worship practice of Methodism that are often held in local churches, as well as at outdoor camp meetings, brush arbor revivals, and at tent revivals.

== United and Uniting churches ==
=== Church of South India ===
The liturgy of the Church of South India combines many traditions, including that of the Methodists and such smaller churches as the Church of the Brethren and the Disciples of Christ. After the formation of the Church of South India the first synod met at Madurai in March 1948 and appointed a liturgical committee. The first Synod in 1948 (where the Holy Communion service was that of the Presbyterian Church of Scotland) appointed a liturgy committee, composed mainly of Western theologians. The liturgy so prepared was first used at the Synod Session in 1950 and approved for use throughout the church "wherever it is desired" in 1954. The first version of the Confirmation Service for the new church was also released in 1950, translated into regional languages and was quickly adopted by the various dioceses.

By 1962 the Liturgy Committee was able to prepare a number of Orders. They were Eucharist, Morning and Evening Prayer, Marriage Service, Burial Service, Ordination Service and Covenant Service (1954), Holy Baptism (1955) and Almanac (1955–56). The Book of Common Worship of the CSI was published in 1963 with all the above orders of service. The orders of service consist of: Order for Morning and Evening Worship, Order of Service for the Baptized Persons, Order for Holy Baptism, Order for the Churching of Women, Order for Holy Matrimony, Order for the Burial Service, Order for the Covenant Service, Order for Ordination Services.

The CSI liturgy was again revised in the year 2004 and published as a hardback book in 2006.

The CSI Synod Liturgical Committee has developed several new orders for worship for different occasions. The order for the Communion Service, known as the CSI Liturgy, has been internationally acclaimed as an important model for new liturgies. The Committee has also produced three different cycles of lectionaries for daily Bible readings and "propers", and collects for Communion services. In addition, the Committee has also brought out a Supplement to the Book of Common Worship.

== Eastern Christian churches ==
=== Eastern Orthodox Church ===
- Liturgy of St. James (Byzantine Rite)
- Liturgy of St Basil (Byzantine Rite)
- Liturgy of St John Chrysostom (Byzantine Rite)
- Liturgy of the Presanctified Gifts (Byzantine Rite)
- Western Rites
  - Numerous; see Western Rites in Orthodox

=== Oriental Orthodox Churches ===
- Liturgy of St. James (West Syriac Rite)
- Liturgy of St. Cyril, also known as Liturgy of St. Mark (Alexandrian Rite)
- Liturgy of St. Basil the Great (Alexandrian & Armenian Rites)
- Liturgy of St. Gregory the Theologian (Alexandrian Rite)
- Liturgy of St. Gregory the Illuminator (Armenian Rite)

=== Assyrian Church of the East ===
- Liturgy of Addai and Mari (East Syriac Rite)
- The Hallowing of Nestorius (East Syriac Rite)
- The Hallowing of Theodore of Mopsuestia (East Syriac Rite)

=== Eastern Catholic Churches ===
- Alexandrian liturgical tradition; 2 sui iuris Catholic Church
  - Coptic Rite
  - Ethiopian
  - Eritrean
- Antiochian (Antiochene or West-Syriac) liturgical tradition, 3 sui iuris Catholic Church. Maronite rite, as the Catechism of the Catholic Church writes it as a separate rite, is unique but of Syriac Origin.
  - (West) Syriac Rite
    - Maronite
    - Syro-Malankara
    - Syriac
- Armenian Rite; 1 sui iuris Catholic Church
  - Armenian
- East Syriac or Chaldean liturgical tradition; 2 sui iuris Catholic Church
  - Chaldean
  - Syro-Malabar
- Byzantine (Constantinopolitan) liturgical tradition (very uniform except in language); 14 sui iuris Catholic Church
  - Albanian, Belarusian, Bulgarian, Croatian, Greek, Hungarian, Italo-Albanian, Macedonian, Melkite, Romanian, Russian, Ruthenian, Slovak, Ukrainian
