= Catholic particular churches and liturgical rites =

Structures within the Catholic Church

A particular church (Latin: ecclesia particularis) is an ecclesiastical community of followers headed by a bishop (or equivalent), as defined by Catholic canon law and ecclesiology. A liturgical rite, a collection of liturgies descending from shared historic or regional context, depends on the particular church the bishop (or equivalent) belongs to. Thus the term "particular church" refers to an institution, and "liturgical rite" to its ritual practices, although the Second Vatican Council (1963–1965) also referred to "rite" as a term then in current use embracing "liturgy, ecclesiastical discipline, and spiritual heritage".

Particular churches exist in two kinds:

1. An autonomous particular church sui iuris: an aggregation of particular churches with distinct liturgical, spiritual, theological and canonical traditions. The largest such autonomous particular church is the Latin Church. The other 23 Eastern Catholic Churches are headed by bishops, some of which are titled Patriarch or Major Archbishop. In this context the descriptors autonomous (Greek: αὐτόνομος, romanized: autónomos) and sui iuris (Latin) are synonymous, meaning "of its own law". While these particular churches have their own laws and practices, the Holy See acts as the arbiter of relations between them.
2. A local particular church: a diocese (or eparchy) headed by a bishop (or equivalent), typically collected in a national polity under an episcopal conference. However, there are also other forms, including apostolic vicariates, apostolic prefectures, military ordinariates, personal ordinariates, and territorial abbacies. (Note: Particular Churches, in which and from which the one and only Catholic Church exists, are principally dioceses. Unless the contrary is clear, the following are equivalent to a diocese: a territorial prelature, a territorial abbacy, a vicariate apostolic, a prefecture apostolic and a permanently established apostolic administration. (Code of Canon Law, canon 368))

Liturgical rites also exist in two kinds:

1. Liturgical rite: a liturgical rite depending on the tradition of an autonomous particular church sui iuris. Catholic liturgies are broadly divided into the Latin liturgical rites of the Latin Church and the various Eastern Catholic liturgies of the other 23 sui iuris churches
2. Catholic order liturgical rite: a variant of a liturgical rite exceptionally depending on a specific religious order.

== Churches ==
=== List of churches sui iuris ===
	Name	Est.	Rite	Seat	Members	Polity	Jurisdictions	Bishops
	Coptic Catholic Church	1741	Alexandrian	Cathedral of Our Lady, Cairo, Egypt	187,320	Patriarchate	8	13
	Eritrean Catholic Church	2015	Alexandrian	Kidane Mehret Cathedral, Asmara, Eritrea	167,722	Metropolitanate	4	4
	Ethiopian Catholic Church	1846	Alexandrian	Cathedral of the Holy Saviour, Addis Ababa, Ethiopia	70,832	Metropolitanate	4	4
	Armenian Catholic Church	1742	Armenian	Cathedral of Saint Elias and Saint Gregory, Beirut, Lebanon	757,726	Patriarchate	18	16
	Albanian Greek Catholic Church	1628	Byzantine	Pro-Cathedral of Saint Mary and Saint Louis, Vlorë, Albania	4,028	Apostolic administration	1	2
	Belarusian Greek Catholic Church	1596	Byzantine	None	9,000	Apostolic administration	0	0
	Bulgarian Greek Catholic Church	1861	Byzantine	Cathedral of the Dormition, Sofia, Bulgaria	10,000	Eparchy	1	1
	Greek Catholic Church in Croatia and Serbia	1611	Byzantine	Several (Note: The Byzantine Catholic Church of Croatia and Serbia comprises two jurisdictions: Greek Catholic Eparchy of Križevci covering Croatia, Slovenia, and Bosnia-Herzegovina, and Byzantine Catholic Eparchy of Ruski Krstur covering Serbia. The Eparchy of Križevci is in foreign province, and the Eparchy of Ruski Krstur is immediately subject to the Holy See.)	42,965	No unified structure	2	2
	Greek Byzantine Catholic Church	1911	Byzantine	Several (Note: The Greek Byzantine Catholic Church comprises two independent apostolic exarchates covering Greece and Turkey respectively, each immediately subject to the Holy See.)	6,016	No unified structure	2	2
	Hungarian Greek Catholic Church	1912	Byzantine	Cathedral of Hajdúdorog, Debrecen, Hungary	262,484	Metropolitanate	3	4
	Italo-Albanian Catholic Church	1784	Byzantine	Several (Note: The Italo-Albanian Greek Catholic Church comprises two independent eparchies (based in Lungro and Piana degli Albanesi) and one territorial abbacy (based in Grottaferrata), each immediately subject to the Holy See.)	55,812	No unified structure	3	2
	Macedonian Greek Catholic Church	2001	Byzantine	Cathedral of the Assumption, Strumica, North Macedonia	11,374	Eparchy	1	1
	Melkite Greek Catholic Church	1726	Byzantine	Cathedral of the Dormition, Damascus, Syria	1,568,239	Patriarchate	29	35
	Romanian Greek Catholic Church	1697	Byzantine	Cathedral of the Holy Trinity, Blaj, Romania	498,658	Major archiepiscopate	7	8
	Russian Greek Catholic Church	1905	Byzantine	None (Note: The Russian Greek Catholic Church comprises two apostolic exarchates (one for Russia and one for China), each immediately subject to the Holy See and each vacant for decades. Bishop Joseph Werth of Novosibirsk has been appointed by the Holy See as ordinary to the Eastern Catholic faithful in Russia, although not as exarch of the dormant apostolic exarchate and without the creation of a formal ordinariate.)	3,200	None	2	0
	Ruthenian Greek Catholic Church	1646	Byzantine	Cathedral of Saint John the Baptist, Pittsburgh, United States	417,795	Metropolitanate (Note: The Ruthenian Catholic Church does not have a unified structure. It includes a Metropolia based in Pittsburgh, which covers the entire United States, but also an eparchy in Ukraine and an apostolic exarchate in the Czech Republic, both of which are directly subject to the Holy See.)	6	8
	Slovak Greek Catholic Church	1646	Byzantine	Cathedral of Saint John the Baptist, Prešov, Slovakia	211,208	Metropolitanate	4	6
	Ukrainian Greek Catholic Church	1595	Byzantine	Cathedral of the Resurrection, Kyiv, Ukraine	4,471,688	Major archiepiscopate	35	50
	Chaldean Catholic Church	1552	East Syriac	Cathedral of Our Lady of Sorrows, Baghdad, Iraq	628,405	Patriarchate	23	23
	Syro-Malabar Catholic Church	1552	East Syriac	Cathedral of Our Lady, Ernakulam, Kerala, India	4,251,399	Major archiepiscopate	35	63
	Maronite Church	4th c.	West Syriac	Church of Bkerke, Bkerke, Lebanon	3,498,707	Patriarchate	29	50
	Syriac Catholic Church	1781	West Syriac	Syriac Catholic Cathedral of Saint Paul, Damascus, Syria	195,765	Patriarchate	16	20
	Syro-Malankara Catholic Church	1930	West Syriac	Cathedral of Saint Mary, Pattom, Kerala, India	458,015	Major archiepiscopate	12	14
	Latin Church	1st c.	Latin	Archbasilica of Saint John Lateran, Rome, Italy	1,295,000,000	Patriarchate		
	Other		Various (Note: Five of the ordinariates for Eastern Catholic faithful are multi-ritual, encompassing the faithful of all Eastern Catholic rites within their territory not otherwise subject to a local ordinary of their own rite. The sixth is exclusively Byzantine, but covers all Byzantine Catholics in Austria, no matter which particular Byzantine Church they belong to.)	Several (Note: The six ordinariates are based in Buenos Aires (Argentina), Vienna (Austria), Belo Horizonte (Brazil), Paris (France), Warsaw (Poland), and Madrid (Spain).)	47,830	Ordinariates	6	6 (Note: Technically, each of these ordinariates has an ordinary who is a bishop, but all of the bishops are Latin bishops whose primary assignment is to a Latin see.)
Total					1.313 billion		2,851 (Note: more 640 Archdioceses)	5,304

=== Ecclesiology ===
In Catholic ecclesiology, a church is an assembly of the faithful, hierarchically ordered, both in the entire world (the Catholic Church), or in a certain territory (a particular church). To be a sacrament (a sign) of the Mystical Body of Christ in the world, a church must have both a head and members (Col. 1:18). The sacramental sign of Christ the head is the sacred hierarchy – the bishops, priests and deacons.

More specifically, it is the local bishop, with his priests and deacons gathered around and assisting him in his office of teaching, sanctifying and governing (Mt. 28:19–20; Titus 1:4–9). Thus, the church is fully present sacramentally (by way of a sign) wherever there is a sign of Christ the head, a bishop and those who assist him, and a sign of Christ's body, Christian faithful. Each diocese is therefore considered a particular church.

On the worldwide level, the sign of Christ the head is the Pope, and, to be Catholic, particular churches, whether local churches or autonomous ritual churches, must be in communion with this sign of Christ the head. Through this full communion with Saint Peter and his successors the church becomes a universal sacrament of salvation to the end of the age (Mt. 28:20).

The word "church" is applied to the Catholic Church as a whole, which is seen as a single church: the multitude of peoples and cultures within the church, and the great diversity of gifts, offices, conditions and ways of life of its members, are not opposed to the church's unity. In this sense of "church", the list of churches in the Catholic Church has only one member, the Catholic Church itself (comprising Roman and Eastern Churches).

Within the Catholic Church there are local particular churches, of which dioceses are the most familiar form. Other forms include territorial abbacies, apostolic vicariates and apostolic prefectures. The 1983 Code of Canon Law states: "Particular Churches, in which and from which the one and only Catholic Church exists, are principally dioceses. Unless the contrary is clear, the following are equivalent to a diocese: a territorial prelature, a territorial abbacy, a vicariate apostolic, a prefecture apostolic and a permanently established apostolic administration." A list of Catholic dioceses, of which on 31 December 2011 there were 2,834, is given at List of Catholic dioceses (alphabetical).

Within the Catholic Church there are also aggregations of local particular churches that share a specific liturgical, theological, spiritual, and canonical heritage, distinguished from other heritages on the basis of cultural and historical circumstances. These are known as autonomous ("sui iuris") churches. The 1990 Code of Canons of the Eastern Churches defines such a church as follows: "A group of Christ's faithful hierarchically linked in accordance with law and given express or tacit recognition by the supreme authority of the Church is in this Code called an autonomous Church." There are 24 such autonomous Catholic churches: One Latin Church (i.e., Western) and 23 Eastern Catholic Churches", a distinction by now more historical than geographical. Although each of them has its own specific heritage, they are all in full communion with the Pope in Rome.

Unlike "families" or "federations" of churches formed through the grant of mutual recognition by distinct ecclesial bodies, the Catholic Church considers itself a single church ("full communion, "one Body") composed of a multitude of particular churches, each of which, as stated, is an embodiment of the fullness of the one Catholic Church. For the particular churches within the Catholic Church, whether autonomous ritual churches (e.g., Coptic Catholic Church, Melkite Catholic Church, Armenian Catholic Church, etc.) or dioceses (e.g., Archdiocese of Birmingham, Archdiocese of Chicago, etc.), are seen as not simply branches, divisions or sections of a larger body. Theologically, each is considered to be the embodiment in a particular place or for a particular community of the one, whole Catholic Church. "It is in these and formed out of them that the one and unique Catholic Church exists."

=== Particular churches sui iuris ===
There are 24 autonomous churches: one Latin Church and twenty-three Eastern Catholic Churches, a distinction by now more historical than geographical. The term sui iuris means, literally, "of its own law", or self-governing. Although all of the particular churches espouse the same beliefs and faith, their distinction lies in their varied expression of that faith through their traditions, disciplines, and canon law. All are in communion with the Holy See.

For this kind of particular church, the 1983 Code of Canon Law uses the unambiguous phrase "autonomous ritual Church" (Latin: Ecclesia ritualis sui iuris). The 1990 Code of Canons of the Eastern Churches, which is concerned principally with what the Second Vatican Council called "particular Churches or rites", shortened this to "autonomous Church" (Latin: Ecclesia sui iuris).

=== Local particular churches ===
In Catholic teaching, each diocese (Latin Church term) or eparchy (Eastern term) is also a local or particular church, though it lacks the autonomy of the autonomous churches described above:

A diocese is a section of the People of God entrusted to a bishop to be guided by him with the assistance of his clergy so that, loyal to its pastor and formed by him into one community in the Holy Spirit through the Gospel and the Eucharist, it constitutes one particular church in which the one, holy, catholic and apostolic Church of Christ is truly present and active.

The 1983 Code of Canon Law, which is concerned with the Latin Church alone and so with only one autonomous particular church, uses the term "particular Church" only in the sense of "local Church", as in its Canon 373:

It is within the competence of the supreme authority alone to establish particular Churches; once they are lawfully established, the law itself gives them juridical personality.

The standard form of these local or particular churches, each of which is headed by a bishop, is called a diocese in the Latin Church and an eparchy in the Eastern churches. At the end of 2011, the total number of all these jurisdictional areas (or "sees") was 2,834.

==== Local particular church of Rome ====
The Holy See, the Diocese of Rome, is seen as the central local church. The bishop, the Pope, is considered to be, in a unique sense, the successor of Saint Peter, the chief (or "prince") of the apostles. Quoting the Second Vatican Council's document Lumen gentium, the Catechism of the Catholic Church states: "The Pope, Bishop of Rome and Peter's successor, 'is the perpetual and visible source and foundation of the unity both of the bishops and of the whole company of the faithful.'"

All the Catholic particular churches, whether Latin or Eastern, local or autonomous, are by definition in full communion with the Holy See of Rome.

== Rites ==
The Code of Canons of the Eastern Churches defines "rite" as "the liturgical, theological, spiritual and disciplinary heritage, distinguished according to peoples' culture and historical circumstances, that finds expression in each autonomous church's way of living the faith".

As thus defined, "rite" concerns not only a people's liturgy (manner of worship), but also its theology (understanding of doctrine), spirituality (prayer and devotion), and discipline (canon law).

In this sense of the word "rite", the list of rites within the Catholic Church is identical with that of the autonomous churches, each of which has its own heritage, which distinguishes that church from others, and membership of a church involves participation in its liturgical, theological, spiritual and disciplinary heritage. However, "church" refers to the people, and "rite" to their heritage.

The Code of Canons of the Eastern Churches states that the rites with which it is concerned (but which it does not list) spring from the following five traditions: Alexandrian, Antiochian, Armenian, Chaldean, and Constantinopolitan. Since it covers only Eastern Catholic churches and rites, it does not mention those of Western (Latin) tradition.

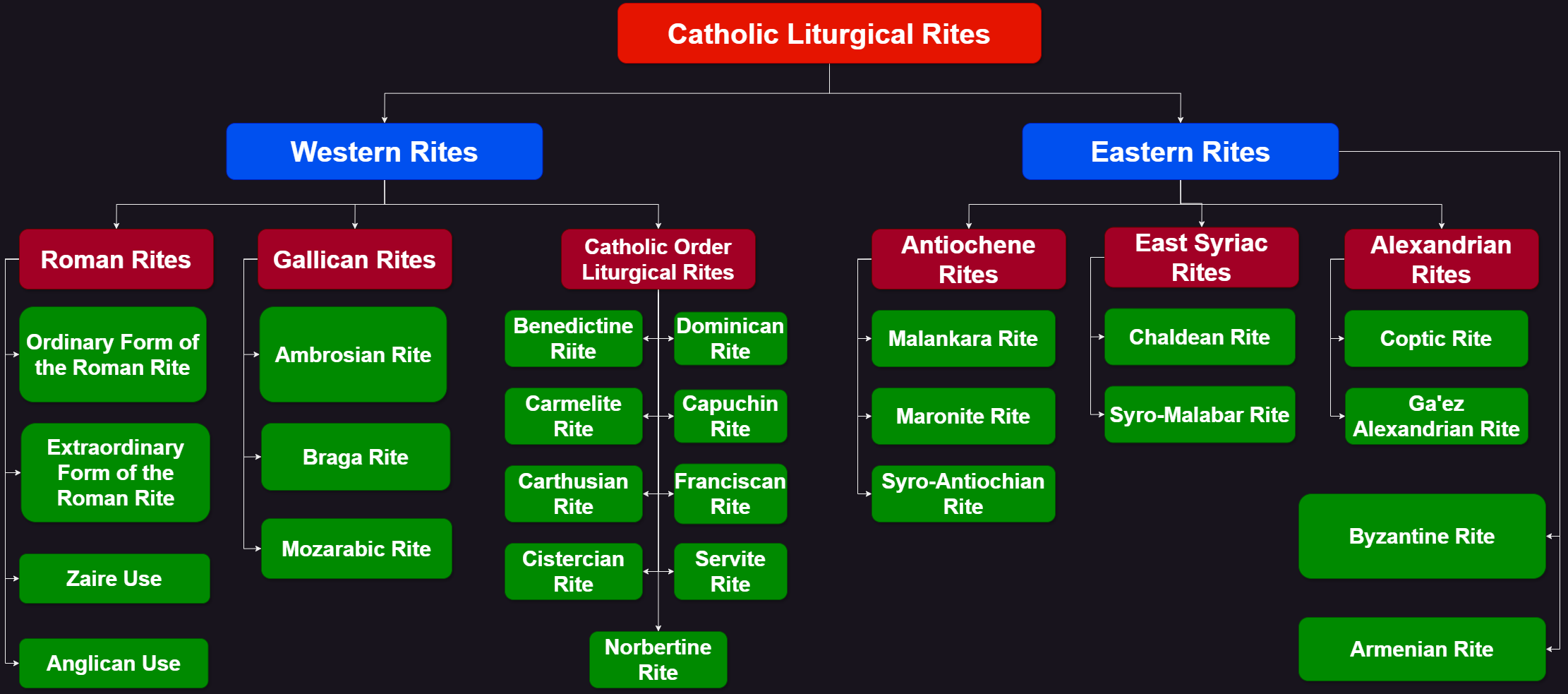
A chart showing Catholic liturgical rites

The word "rite" is sometimes used with reference only to liturgy, ignoring the theological, spiritual and disciplinary elements in the heritage of the churches. In this sense, "rite" has been defined as "the whole complex of the (liturgical) services of any Church or group of Churches". Between "rites" in this exclusively liturgical sense and the autonomous churches there is no strict correspondence, such as there is when "rite" is understood as in the Code of Canons of the Eastern Churches. The 14 autonomous churches of Byzantine tradition have a single liturgical rite, but vary mainly in liturgical language, while on the contrary the single Latin Church has several distinct liturgical rites, whose universal main form, the Roman Rite, is practised in Latin or in the local vernacular).

=== Latin (Western) rites ===
Extant
- Roman Rite
  - Ordinary form of the Roman Rite
  - Extraordinary form of the Roman Rite
  - Anglican Use
  - Zaire Use
  - Adaptations for some Indigenous peoples of Mexico
- Gallican Rites
  - Ambrosian Rite (in Milan and neighbouring areas, Italy, and parts of Ticino, Switzerland)
  - Braga Rite (In Braga, Portugal)
  - Rite of Lyon (in Lyon, France)
  - Mozarabic Rite (in Toledo and Salamanca, Spain)
- Catholic order liturgical rites
  - Benedictine Rite
  - Carmelite Rite (only by some communities or members of the order)
  - Carthusian Rite (a Western rite of the Gallican family)
  - Cistercian Rite
  - Dominican Rite (only by some communities or members of the order)
  - Premonstratensian (Norbertine) Rite
  - Rites in a broad sense (not distinct from the Roman Rite)
    - Capuchin Rite
    - Franciscan Rite
    - Servite Rite

Defunct
- African Rite
- Aquileian Rite (northeastern Italy)
- Benevente and Sizilian Use
- Celtic Rite (British Isles)
- Cologne Use (Cologne, Germany)
- Durham Rite (Durham, England)
- Esztergom Use (Hungary)
- Metz Use (Low Countries)
- Nidaros Use (Norway)
- Pre-Tridentine Mass (the various pre-1570 ordinary forms of the Roman Rite)
- Sarum Rite (Salisbury, England)
- Uppsala Use (Sweden)
- Use of York (York, England)

=== Eastern rites ===
Extant
- Byzantine Rite (Note: This rite, though used by 14 Eastern particular churches has preserved, apart from the diversity of languages used, its uniformity and remained a single liturgical rite, though there is a Slavonic Use among Ukrainian and other Slavic churches.)
- Antiochene family
  - Malankara Rite
  - Maronite Rite
  - Syro-Antiochian Rite
- East Syriac or Chaldean tradition
  - Chaldean Rite
  - Syro-Malabar Rite
- Armenian Rite
- Alexandrian Rite
  - Coptic Rite
  - Geʽez Rite

=== Transfers between rites ===
Pope Pius XII stipulated in his motu proprio Cleri sanctitati in 1957 that Catholics could only transfer from one rite to another with the permission of the Holy See, noting that a return to a person's historical family rite would likely be an example of a reason for a person to transfer. On or after marriage, a woman could transfer to her husband's rite, and on his death or the dissolution of the marriage, she could return to her former rite.

== See also ==
- Autocephaly
- Catholic Church by country
- Index of Catholic Church articles
- List of Catholic dioceses (structured view)
