= Catholic order liturgical rite =

Variant of a Catholic liturgical rite

A Catholic order liturgical rite is a variant of a Catholic liturgical rite distinct from the typical ones, such as the Roman Rite, but instead specific to a certain Catholic religious order.

Catholic order liturgical rites exist as variants of both Latin liturgical rites and Eastern liturgical rites, that is of both the Latin Church and the Eastern Catholic Churches, respectively.

== Rites in the strict sense ==
1. The Benedictine Rite is a rite used by the Benedictines that is specific to the canonical hours. It does not apply to their Mass, which is of the Roman Rite.
2. The Cistercian Rite is used by the Cistercians.
3. The Carthusian Rite is used by the Carthusians.
4. The Carmelite Rite is used the Carmelites, and also by the Monks of the Most Blessed Virgin Mary of Mount Carmel and the Brazilian Hermits of the Blessed Virgin Mary of Mount Carmel.
5. The Dominican Rite is used by the Dominican Order, as well as the Fraternity of Saint Vincent Ferrer.
6. The Premonstratensian Rite is used by the Premonstratensians.

Apart from these, most religious orders also have their own customs, privileges, and liturgical calendar not amounting to a separate liturgical rite.

== Rites in a broad sense (not distinct from the Roman Rite) ==
The early-twentieth-century Catholic Encyclopedia, in its article entitled "Rites", applied the term "rite" loosely to some practices that certain religious orders followed at that time, while stating that they in fact used the Roman Rite.

What follows is a transcription of that text, leaving unaltered its no longer true statements and its spelling (e.g. "connexion").

=== Franciscan Rite ===
The Franciscans, unlike the Dominicans, Carmelites and other orders, have never had a peculiar rite properly so called, but conformably to the mind of St. Francis of Assisi always followed the Roman Rite for the celebration of Mass. However, the Friars Minor and the Capuchins wear the amice, instead of the biretta, over the head, and are accustomed to say Mass with their feet uncovered, save only by sandals. They also enjoy certain privileges in regard to the time and place of celebrating Mass, and the Missale Romano-Seraphicum contains many proper Masses not found in the Roman Missal. These are mostly feasts of Franciscan saints and blessed, which are not celebrated throughout the Church, or other feasts having a peculiar connexion with the order, e.g. the Feast of the Mysteries of the Way of the Cross (Friday before Septuagesima), and that of the Seven Joys of the Blessed Virgin (First Sunday after the octave of the Assumption). The same is true in regard to the Breviarium Romano-Seraphicum and Martyrologium Romano-Seraphicum.

The Franciscans exercised great influence in the origin and evolution of the Roman Breviary, and on the revision of the Rubrics of the Mass. They have also their own calendar, or ordo. This calendar may be used not only in the churches of the First Order, but also in the churches and chapels of the Second Order, and Third Order Regular (if aggregated to the First Order) and Secular, as well as those religious institutes which have had some connexion with the parent body. It may also be used by secular priests or clerics who are members of the Third Order. The order has also its own ritual and ceremonial for its receptions, professions, etc.

=== Friars Minor Capuchin Rite ===
The Friars Minor Capuchin use the Roman Rite, except that in the Confiteor the name of their founder, St. Francis is added after the names of the Apostles, and in the suffrages they make commemorations of St. Francis and all saints of their order. The use of incense in the conventual mass on certain solemnities, even though the Mass is said and not sung, is another liturgical custom (recently sanctioned by the Holy See) peculiar to their order. Generally speaking, the Capuchins do not have sung Masses except in parochial churches, and except in these churches they may not have organs without the minister general's permission. By a Decree of the Sacred Congregation of Rites of 14 May 1890, the minister general, when celebrating Mass at the time of the canonical visitation and on solemnities, has the privileges of a domestic prelate of the Pope.

In regard to the Divine Office, the Capuchins do not sing it according to note but recite it in monotone. In the larger communities they generally recite Matins and Lauds at midnight, except on the three last days of Holy Week, when Tenebræ is chanted on the preceding evening, and during the octaves of Corpus Christi and the Immaculate Conception of the Blessed Virgin Mary, when matins are recited also on the preceding evening with the Blessed Sacrament exposed. Every day after Compline they add, extra-liturgically, commemorations of the Immaculate Conception, St. Francis and St. Anthony of Padua. On the feast of St. Francis after second Vespers they observe the service called the Transitus of St. Francis, and on all Saturdays, except feasts of first and second class and certain privileged feriæ and octaves, all Masses said in their churches are votive in honour of the Immaculate Conception, excepting only the conventual mass.

They follow the General Roman Calendar, with the addition of feasts proper to their order. These additional feasts include all canonized saints of the whole Franciscan Order, all beati of the Capuchin Reform and the more notable beati of the whole order; and every year October 5 is observed as a commemoration of the departed members of the order in the same way as November 2 is observed in the universal Church as All Souls. Owing to the great number of feasts thus observed, the Capuchins have the privilege of transferring the greater feasts, when necessary, to days marked semi-double. According to the ancient Constitutions of the Order, the Capuchins were not allowed to use vestments of rich texture, nor silk, but by Decree of the Sacred Congregation of Rites of 17 December 1888, they must conform to the general laws of the Church in this matter. They remain obliged to maintain severe simplicity in their churches, especially when non-parochial.

=== Servite Rite ===
The Order of Servites (or Servants of Mary) cannot be said to possess a separate or exclusive rite similar to the Dominicans and others, but follows the Roman Ritual, as provided in its constitutions, with very slight variations. Devotion towards the Mother of Sorrows being the principal distinctive characteristic of the order, there are special prayers and indulgences attaching to the solemn celebration of the five major Marian feasts: the Annunciation, Visitation, Assumption, Presentation and Nativity of our Blessed Lady.

The feast of the Seven Dolours of the Blessed Virgin Mary, celebrated always on the Third Sunday of September, has a privileged octave and is enriched with a plenary indulgence ad instar Portiunculae; that is, as often as a visit is made to a church of the order. In common with all friars the Servite priests wear an amice on the head instead of a biretta while proceeding to and from the altar. The Mass is begun with the first part of the Angelical Salutation, and in the Confiteor the words Septem beatis patribus nostris 'our seven blessed fathers' are inserted. At the conclusion of Mass the Salve Regina and the oration Omnipotens sempiterne Deus are recited. In the recitation of the Divine Office each canonical hour is begun with the Ave Maria down to the words ventris tui, Jesus. The custom of reciting daily, immediately before Vespers, a special prayer called Vigilia, composed of the three psalms and three antiphons of the first nocturn of the Office of the Blessed Virgin, followed by three lessons and responses, comes down from the thirteenth century, when they were offered in thanksgiving for a special favour bestowed upon the order by Pope Alexander IV (13 May 1259). The Salve Regina is daily chanted in choir whether or not it is the antiphon proper to the season.
