= Indian Mass =

Version of the Catholic Church mass

Indian Mass is a partially vernacularized variation of the Tridentine Mass of the Catholic Church, used in the Indigenous North American missions of Canada and the United States. The priest's portion of the Mass was kept in Latin, but the chants assigned to the schola were sung in the vernacular.

The Indian Masses date to the mid-17th century, and permission for them was apparently granted by an indult by Rome, although record of the indult itself has not been found. Nonetheless, these partially vernacularized Masses flourished in the missions with episcopal approval for several hundred years until the time of the Second Vatican Council.

== Structure of the Indian mass ==
The Indian Mass differed from the Tridentine Mass in its use of vernacular language ordinaries and propers. The ordinaries were straightforward translations of the Mass texts. However, the propers often differed significantly from their Roman counterparts. Typically, a handful of Introits rotated duty throughout the liturgical year. Graduals sometimes occur, though hymns are often sung in their place. The Offertory and Communion verses are almost always dropped in favor of vernacular hymns.

== See also ==
- Latin liturgical rites
