= Capitulare =

Capitulare may mean:

- a legislative text in separate chapters - see capitularium
- certain liturgical books, notably:
  - Evangeliarium
  - Collectarium
  - Antiphonary
