= Latin liturgical rites =

Category of Catholic rites of public worship

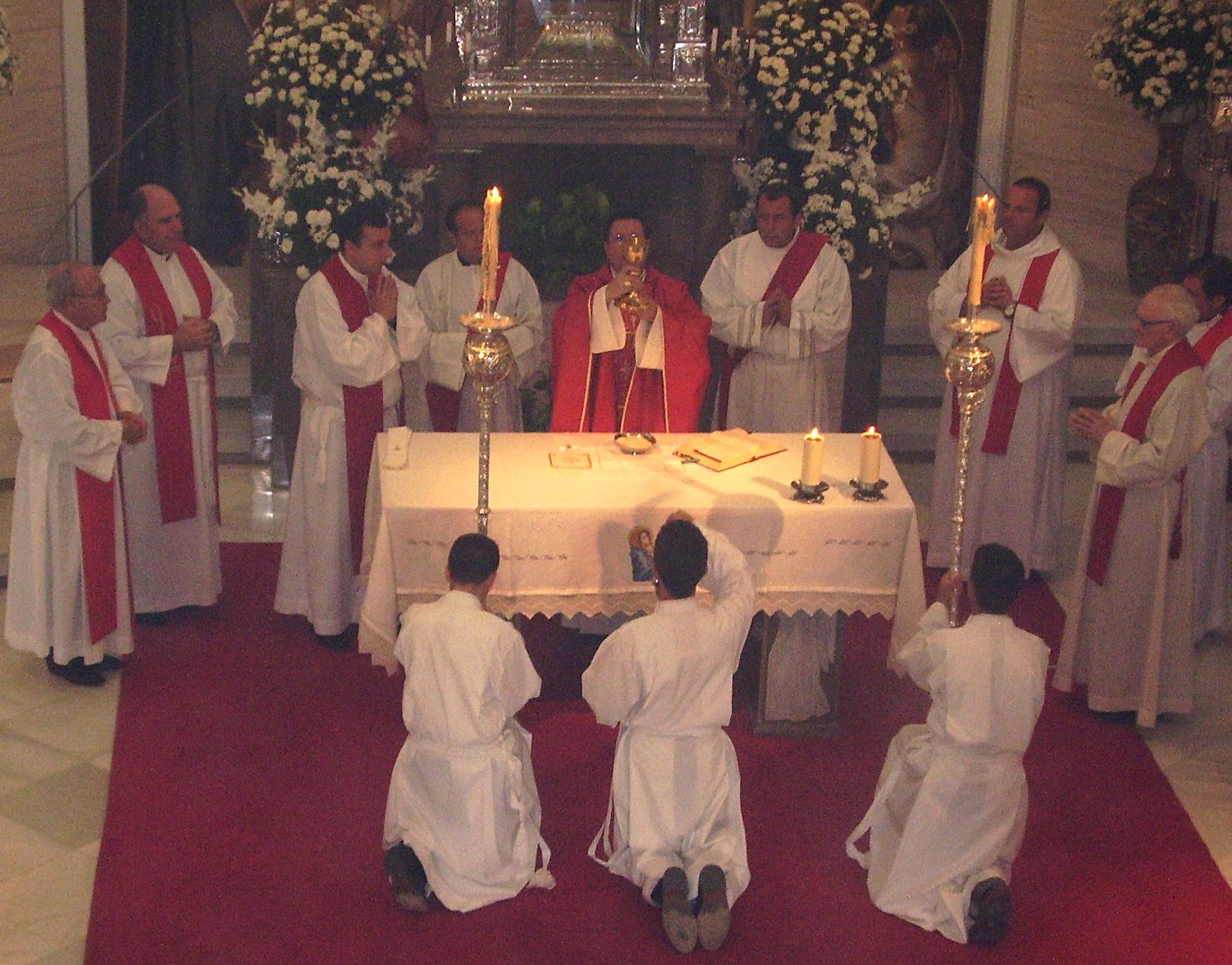
Priests at a Mass in the Roman Rite, the most widely used Latin liturgical rite

Latin liturgical rites, or Western liturgical rites, is a large family of liturgical rites and uses of public worship employed by the Latin Church, the largest particular church sui iuris of the Catholic Church, that originated in Europe where the Latin language once dominated and further by Western Rite Orthodoxy and Independent and Old Catholicism. Its language is now known as Ecclesiastical Latin. The most used rite is the Roman Rite.

The Latin rites were for many centuries as numerous as the modern Eastern Catholic liturgical rites. The number of Latin rites and uses is now much lower. In the aftermath of the Council of Trent, in 1568 and 1570 Pope Pius V suppressed the breviaries and missals that could not be shown to have an antiquity of at least two centuries in favor of the Roman Missal and Roman Breviary. Many local rites that remained legitimate after this decree were abandoned voluntarily, especially in the 19th century, in favor of the Tridentine Mass and other Roman Rite rituals. In the second half of the 20th century, most of the religious orders that had a distinct liturgical rite chose to adopt in its place the Roman Rite as revised in accordance with the decrees of the Second Vatican Council and the Mass of Paul VI. A few such liturgical rites persist for the celebration of Mass, in revised forms since 1965–1970. Distinct liturgical rites for celebrating the other sacraments have been mostly stopped being used.

== Latin liturgical rites currently in use ==
=== Roman Rite ===
The Roman Rite is by far the most widely used. Like other liturgical rites, it developed over time, with newer forms replacing the older. It underwent many changes in the first millennium, during half of its existence (see Pre-Tridentine Mass). The forms that Pope Pius V, as requested by the Council of Trent, established in the 1560s and 1570s underwent repeated minor variations in the centuries immediately following.

The 20th century saw more profound changes. Pope Pius X radically rearranged the Psalter of the Breviary and altered the rubrics of the Mass. Pope Pius XII significantly revised the Holy Week ceremonies and certain other aspects of the Roman Missal in 1955. Finally, the Pontificate of Pope Paul VI saw the total rearranging of Latin liturgy as a result of the Second Vatican Council.

==== Ordinary Form ====
The Second Vatican Council (1962–1965) was followed by a general revision of the rites of all the Roman Rite sacraments, including the Eucharist. This revision is known as Mass of Paul VI.

As before, each new typical edition of a liturgical book supersedes the previous one. Thus, the 1970 Roman Missal, which superseded the 1962 edition, was superseded by the edition of 1975. The 2002 edition in turn supersedes the 1975 edition both in Latin and, as official translations into each language appear, also in the vernacular languages.

Under the terms of Summorum Pontificum by Pope Benedict XVI, the Mass of Paul VI was known as the Ordinary Form of the Roman Rite.

==== Extraordinary Form ====
The Tridentine Mass, as in the 1962 Roman Missal, and other pre-Vatican II rites are still authorized for use within the Roman Rite under the conditions indicated in the motu proprio Traditionis Custodes.

These liturgical practices emanate from the liturgical reforms of the Council of Trent, from which the word "Tridentine" is derived. Following its description in Summorum Pontificum by Pope Benedict XVI, the ritual use of liturgical books promulgated before Vatican II was sometimes known as the Extraordinary Form of the Roman Rite.

==== Anglican Use ====
The Anglican Use is a use of the Roman Rite, rather than a unique rite itself. During the Liturgy of the Eucharist, especially the Eucharistic Prayer, it is closest to other forms of the Roman Rite, while it differs more during the Liturgy of the Word and the Penitential Rite. The language used, which differs from that of the ICEL translation of the Roman Rite of Mass, is based upon the Book of Common Prayer, originally written in the 16th century. Prior to the establishment of the personal ordinariates, parishes in the United States were called "Anglican Use" and used the Book of Divine Worship, an adaptation of the Book of Common Prayer. The Book of Divine Worship has been replaced with the similar Divine Worship: The Missal for use in the ordinariates worldwide, replacing the official term "Anglican Use" with "Divine Worship".

Anglican liturgical rituals, whether those used in the ordinariates of the Catholic Church or in the various prayer books and missals of the Anglican Communion and other denominations, trace their origin back to the Sarum Use, which was a variation of the Roman Rite used in England before introduction during the reign of Edward VI of the 1549 Book of Common Prayer, following the break from the Roman church under the previous monarch Henry VIII.

On 9 November 2009, Pope Benedict XVI established a worldwide provision for Anglicans who joined the church. This process set up personal ordinariates for former Anglicans and other persons entering the full communion of the Catholic Church. These ordinariates would be similar to dioceses, but encompassing entire regions or nations. Parishes belonging to an ordinariate would not be part of the local diocese. These ordinariates are charged with maintaining the Anglican liturgical, spiritual and pastoral traditions, and they have full faculties to celebrate the Eucharist and the other sacraments, the Liturgy of the Hours and other liturgical functions in accordance with the liturgical books proper to the Anglican tradition, in revisions approved by the Holy See. This faculty does not exclude liturgical celebrations according to the Roman Rite.

The Personal Ordinariate of Our Lady of Walsingham was set up for England and Wales on 15 January 2011; the Personal Ordinariate of the Chair of Saint Peter for the United States and Canada on 1 January 2012; and the Personal Ordinariate of Our Lady of the Southern Cross for Australia on 15 June 2012. As of 2017 it was decreed that all parishes in the United States established under the Pastoral Provision be transferred to the Ordinariate. Bishop Steven Lopes of the Personal Ordinariate of the Chair of Saint Peter has requested that terms such as "Anglican Use" and "Anglican Ordinariate" be avoided, saying "Our clergy and faithful do not like being called Anglican, both because this is insensitive to actual Anglicans, and because it is a subtle way of suggesting that their entrance into full communion is less than total. We are Catholic in every sense."

=== Rites of religious orders ===
Some religious orders celebrated Mass according to rites of their own, dating from more than 200 years before the papal bull Quo primum. These rites were based on local usages and combined elements of the Roman and Gallican Rites. Following the Second Vatican Council, they have mostly been abandoned, except for the Carthusian Rite (see below). Religious orders of more recent origin have never had special rites.

==== Carthusian Rite ====
The Carthusian rite is in use in a version revised in 1981. Apart from the new elements in this revision, it is substantially the rite of Grenoble in the 12th century, with some admixture from other sources. Among other differences from the Roman Order of Mass, the deacon prepares the gifts while the Epistle is being sung, the celebrating priest washes his hands twice at the offertory and says the eucharistic prayer with arms extended in the form of a cross except when using his hands for some specific action, and there is no blessing at the end of Mass.

==== Benedictine Rite ====
The Order of Saint Benedict has never had a rite of the Mass peculiar to it, but it keeps its Benedictine Rite of the Liturgy of the Hours.

==== Carmelite Rite ====
The Rite of the Holy Sepulchre, commonly called the Carmelite Rite, is the liturgical rite that was used by the Canons Regular of the Holy Sepulchre, Hospitallers, Templars, Carmelites and the other orders founded within the Latin Patriarchate of Jerusalem.

==== Premonstratensian or Norbertine Rite ====
The Premonstratensian Rite or Norbertine Rite is the liturgical rite, somewhat distinct from the Roman Rite, specific to the Premonstratensian Order of the Catholic Church.

The Norbertine rite differs from the Roman Rite in the celebration of Mass, the Liturgy of the Hours and the administration of the Sacrament of Penance.

==== Cistercian Rite ====
The Cistercian Rite is the liturgical rite, distinct from the Roman Rite, specific to the Cistercian Order of the Catholic Church. The Cistercians are a reformed branch of the Benedictines.

==== Dominican Rite ====
The Dominican Rite is the unique liturgical rite of the Dominican Order in the Catholic Church. It has been classified differently by different sources – some consider it a usage of the Roman Rite, others a variant of the Gallican Rite, and still others a form of the Roman Rite into which Gallican elements were inserted.

==== Franciscan Rite ====
The Franciscans, unlike the Dominicans, Carmelites, and other orders, have never had a peculiar rite properly so called, but conformably to the mind of St. Francis of Assisi always followed the Roman Rite for the celebration of Mass. They also enjoy certain privileges in regard to the time and place of celebrating Mass, and the Missale Romano-Seraphicum contains many proper Masses not found in the Roman Missal.

==== Friars Minor Capuchin Rite ====
The Friars Minor Capuchin use the Roman Rite, except that in the Confiteor the name of their founder, St. Francis is added after the names of the Apostles, and in the suffrages they make commemorations of St. Francis and all saints of their order. The use of incense in the conventual mass on certain solemnities, even though the Mass is said and not sung, is another liturgical custom (recently sanctioned by the Holy See) peculiar to their order. Generally speaking, the Capuchins do not have sung Masses except in parochial churches, and except in these churches they may not have organs without the minister general's permission.

==== Servite Rite ====
The Order of Servites (or Servants of Mary) cannot be said to possess a separate or exclusive rite similar to the Dominicans and others, but follows the Roman Ritual, as provided in its constitutions, with very slight variations. Devotion towards the Mother of Sorrows being the principal distinctive characteristic of the order, there are special prayers and indulgences attaching to the solemn celebration of the five major Marian feasts: the Annunciation, Visitation, Assumption, Presentation and Nativity of our Blessed Lady.

=== Regional uses of the Roman Rite ===
==== Rite or Use of Versailles ====
The Rite of Versailles is a heavily Romanized form of the Gallican Rite still used in some parts of France.

==== Rite or Use of Lyon ====
The Lyonese Rite of the Diocese of Lyon, which some consider to have been (rather than Milan) the centre of diffusion of the Gallican liturgy; it is maintained in a few parishes in Lyon.

==== Rite or Use of Bayeux ====
The Bayeusian Rite of the Diocese of Bayeux is another variant of the Gallican liturgy and is still used at Bayeux Cathedral and the Abbey of Saint-Étienne.

==== Rite or Use of Braga ====
The Rite of Braga is used, but since 18 November 1971 only on an optional basis, in the Archdiocese of Braga in northern Portugal. The Pontifical Commission Ecclesia Dei (PCED) considers it a local Use of the Roman Rite, rather than an independent rite.

==== Zaire Use ====
The Zaire Use is an inculturated variation of the Ordinary Form of the Roman Rite of the Catholic Church. It has been used to a very limited extent in some African countries since the late 1970s to early 1980s.

==== Adaptations for some Indigenous peoples of Mexico ====
Similarly to the Zaire Use, the Vatican approved certain adaptations for Indigenous Mexican groups in 2024. This use is only for the Diocese of San Cristóbal de Las Casas. The adaptations include a new "ministry of incensation," to administer incense (distinct from the thurifer), as well the "Principal," a layperson who guides the congregation in prayer at certain moments. It was the second time after Vatican II that adaptations of the Mass have been approved.

=== Gallican Rites ===
==== Ambrosian Rite ====
The Ambrosian Rite is celebrated most often in the Archdiocese of Milan, Italy, and in parts of some neighbouring dioceses in Italy and Switzerland. The language used is now usually Italian, rather than Latin. With some variant texts and minor differences in the order of readings, it is similar in form to the Roman Rite.

==== Mozarabic Rite ====
The Mozarabic Rite, which was prevalent throughout Hispania in Visigothic times, is now celebrated only in limited locations, principally the cathedral of Toledo.

== Defunct Latin liturgical rites ==
=== African Rite ===
In Africa Proconsulare, located in present-day Tunisia (of which Carthage was the capital), the African Rite was used before the 7th-century Arab conquest. It was very close to the Roman Rite – so much so that Western liturgical traditions have been classified as belonging to two streams, the North African-Rome tradition, and the Gallican tradition encompassing the rest of the Western Roman Empire, including northern Italy.

=== Celtic Rite ===
The ancient Celtic Rite was a composite of non-Roman ritual structures (possibly Antiochian) and texts not exempt from Roman influence, that was similar to the Mozarabic Rite in many respects and would have been used at least in parts of Ireland, Scotland, the northern part of England and perhaps even Wales, Cornwall and Somerset, before being authoritatively replaced by the Roman Rite in the early Middle Ages. "Celtic" is possibly a misnomer and it may owe its origins to Augustine's re-evangelisation of the British Isles in the 6th century. Little is known of it, though several texts and liturgies survive.

Some Christians – typically groups not in communion with the Catholic Church, especially some Western Orthodox Christian communities in communion with Eastern Orthodox Churches, e.g. Celtic Orthodoxy – have attempted to breathe life into a reconstruction of the Celtic Rite, the historical accuracy of which is debated. Historical evidence of this rite is found in the remnants of the Stowe (Lorrha) Missal.

=== Gallic Rite ===
The Gallic Rite is a retrospective term applied to the sum of the local variants, on similar lines to that designated elsewhere as the Celtic Rite (above) and the Mozarabic Rite, which faded from use in France by the end of the first millennium. It should not be confused with the so-called Neo-Gallican liturgical books published in various French dioceses after the Council of Trent, which had little or nothing to do with it.

=== Regional Latin rites or uses ===
Several local rites of limited scope existed during the Middle Ages and down to the Council of Trent, but are now defunct. More properly these are uses or variants of the Roman Rite, most with Gallican elements, a few with Eastern liturgical and traditional elements.

- The Aquileian Rite, a defunct rite originating in the former patriarchate of Aquileia in northern Italy. Probably a Gallican Rite.
- The Rite of Ravenna, a defunct rite originating in the former Byzantine Exarchate of Ravenna. Probably a Gallican Rite.
- Beneventan and Sicilian Use (defunct: Norman Southern Italy).
- Bangor Use (defunct: Bangor, Wales).
- The Durham Use (defunct: County Durham, England)
- Hereford Use (defunct: Herefordshire, England).
- Nidaros Use, long defunct, based mainly on imported English liturgical books, used in pre-Reformation Norway.
- Uppsala Use (defunct: Sweden).
- Sarum Use, a defunct rite formerly used in much of England prior to the Reformation.
- The Scottish Use, a defunct rite used Scotland from the twelfth century until the Reformation, it drew heavily on the Use of Sarum. It only survives in the Arbuthnott Missal.
- York Use, a defunct rite used in northern England which was suppressed by Henry VIII, first in favour of Sarum Use and then the Book of Common Prayer.
- Paris Use, defunct (Paris, France).
- Rouen Use, defunct (Rouen, France).
- Metz Use, defunct (Metz, France).
- Cologne Use, defunct (Cologne, Germany).
- Trier Use, defunct (Trier, Germany)
- Esztergom Use, defunct (Hungary).
- Slavonic Use, defunct (Dalmatia and Istria), unique among Pre-Tridentine Mass. Uses of the Roman Rite for using the Croatian Recension of Church Slavonic as its liturgical language. Nevertheless, its liturgy is mainly Latin.
- Indian Mass, defunct. In Catholic missions to the Indigenous peoples of North America, a form of the Tridentine Mass was approved that integrated vernacular portions while retaining the use of Latin in certain parts of the Mass. Liturgical books for these liturgies were published through at least 1890.

== See also ==
- Alexandrian Rite
- Antiochene Rite
- Armenian Rite
- Byzantine Rite
- Catholic particular churches and liturgical rites
- East Syriac Rite
- General Roman Calendar
- Western Rite Orthodoxy
- West Syriac Rite
- West Lutheran Rite
