= Introit =

Feature of the Eucharist celebration

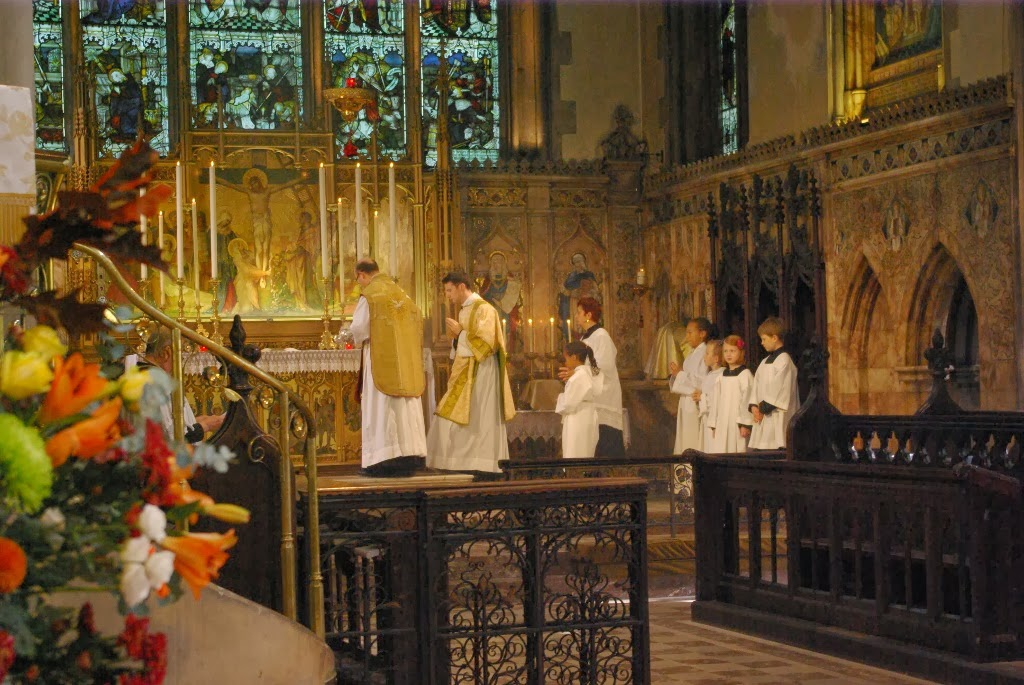
A priest prays the Introit in St Gabriel's Church, Pimlico.

The Introit (Note: Pronounced /ˈɪntrɔɪt/, /ˈɪntroʊɪt/, or /ɪnˈtroʊɪt/.) (from Latin introitus 'entrance') is part of the opening of the liturgical celebration of the Eucharist for many Christian denominations. In its most complete version, it consists of an antiphon, psalm verse and Gloria Patri, which are spoken or sung at the beginning of the celebration. It is part of the proper of the liturgy: that is, the part that changes over the liturgical year.

In the Roman Rite of the Catholic Church it is known as the antiphona ad introitum (Entrance antiphon), as in the text for each day's Mass, or as the cantus ad introitum (Entrance chant) as in the General Instruction of the Roman Missal, 47 and the First Roman Ordo (sixth to seventh century). In pre-1970 editions of the Roman Missal, the word Introitus was used, distinguished from the normal meaning of the word (entrance) by being capitalized. In Ambrosian chant and Beneventan chant, the counterpart of the Introit is called the ingressa. The Lutheran rite uses the term Introit in the same fashion, marking the opening of the Mass. In the Mozarabic, Carthusian, Dominican, and Carmelite rites, it is called the "officium".

== History ==
Originally, the entrance of the priest who was to celebrate Mass was accompanied by the singing of a whole psalm, with Gloria Patri (doxology). While the psalm was at first sung responsorially, with an antiphon repeated by all at intervals, while a solo singer chanted the words of the psalm, it was soon sung directly by two groups of singers alternating with each other, and with the antiphon sung only at the beginning and the end, as is the usual way of chanting the psalms in the Liturgy of the Hours. The change to this manner of singing the psalm has been attributed to Pope Celestine I (422–432). Pope Gregory I (590–604), after whom Gregorian chant is named, composed several antiphons for singing with the Entrance psalm.

If singing of the psalm was not completed by the time the Entrance procession arrived at the altar, the singers moved directly to the Gloria Patri and the final repetition of the antiphon. In time only the opening verse of the psalm was kept, together with the Gloria Patri, preceded and followed by the antiphon, the form of the Introit in Tridentine Mass Roman Missals, which explicitly indicate this manner of singing the Introit.

The 1970 revision of the Roman Missal explicitly envisages singing the entire psalm associated with the antiphon, but does not make it obligatory. In contemporary Catholic usage, the introit corresponds to the Entrance Antiphon and is sung or recited audibly throughout by the faithful.

== Text and liturgical use ==
The antiphons of most Introits are taken from Psalms, though many come from other parts of Scripture. In some rare cases the antiphon is not from Scripture: "Salve, sancta parens", from the Christian poet Sedulius, who was imitating a line from book V of Virgil's Aeneid, is the antiphon used in the Tridentine form of the Roman Rite for common Masses of the Blessed Virgin Mary; the 1970 revision kept a Mass formula of the Blessed Virgin with that antiphon, but provided several alternatives.

The words of the antiphons are related to the theme of the feastday or celebration and most frequently have something in common with the liturgical readings of the Mass.

In the Tridentine Mass the Introit is no longer the first text used in the Mass. In Low Mass, the priest reads it only after the Prayers at the Foot of the Altar. Until 1908, even in sung Mass the choir began the Introit only after the priest had begun those prayers, but Pope Pius X restored the old arrangement whereby the Introit accompanied the entrance procession of the priest with the ministers. The Tridentine Mass has the priest read the Introit in the Missal even when it is also sung by the choir. It also has him make the sign of the cross when reading it, as the Introit is when the Mass has properly begun, rather than the preparatory prayers made at the foot of the altar.

Since the 1970 revision of the Roman Missal, the Entrance chant begins as the priest enters. Its purpose is to open the celebration, foster the unity of those who have been gathered, turn their thoughts to the mystery of the celebration, and accompany the procession. If there is no singing at the Entrance, the antiphon in the Missal is recited either by the faithful, or by some of them, or by a lector; otherwise, it is recited by the priest himself, who may even adapt it as an introductory explanation.

If another rite immediately precedes Mass, such as the Palm Sunday procession or the various ceremonies that precede Mass at the Easter Vigil, Mass begins with the collect; there is no Entrance at that point and so no Entrance chant.

== Musical setting ==
In the musical idiom of Gregorian chant, Introits normally take the form antiphon-verse-antiphon-doxology-antiphon. In the Tridentine Missal, this form was, with very few exceptions, reduced to antiphon-verse-doxology-antiphon.

For example, the Tridentine Missal presents the Introit of the Fourth Sunday of Advent as follows:

First the antiphon Rorate caeli from Isaiah 45:8:

Rorate, cæli, desuper, et nubes pluant iustum:
aperiatur terra, et germinet Salvatorem.
(Drop down dew, ye heavens, from above, and let the clouds rain the Just: let the earth be opened, and bud forth a Saviour.)

Then the verse from the beginning of the psalm, Psalm 18:2:

Caeli enarrant gloriam Dei,
et opera manuum eius annuntiat firmamentum.
(The heavens shew forth the glory of God, and the firmament declareth the work of his hands.)

Then the doxology.

Gloria Patri, et Filio, et Spiritui Sancto,
Sicut erat in principio, et nunc, et semper, et in sæcula sæculorum. Amen.
(Glory be to the Father, and to the Son, and to the Holy Ghost, as it was in the beginning, is now, and ever shall be, world without end. Amen.)

Then, once again, the initial antiphon: Rorate ... Salvatorem.

Introits, like Offertories and Communions, are believed to have evolved from simpler reciting tones. Introit melodies show this musical parentage most clearly, and are often anchored around two reciting notes which may be repeated or percussed. The melodies are mostly neumatic, dominated by neumes with two or three notes per syllable, although syllabic and melismatic passages also occur.

The Introits of Old Roman chant share many similarities with their Gregorian cousins, and often include a repeated extra verse that fell out of use in the Gregorian repertory.

== Use of the incipit ==
In the same way as Church documents are referred to by their incipit (their first words in Latin), Mass formulas are known by the incipit of their Introit, which is the first text in the formula. Thus a Mass for the dead is referred to a Requiem Mass, and the three Christmas Day Masses have been called Dominus dixit, Lux fulgebit and Puer natus. So too, Gaudete Sunday is a name for the third Sunday in Advent, Laetare Sunday for the fourth Sunday in Lent, and Quasimodo Sunday for the Octave or Second Sunday of Easter, because of the incipit of the Entrance antiphons of those Sundays.

== In Lutheran liturgy ==
The introit opens the Mass in the Lutheran churches. It is at this point of the Mass that the priest (pastor) enters the chancel.

== In Anglican liturgy ==
In the Anglican Communion, Introit is the name given to the hymn or metrical psalm which is sung at the start of a service when the priest enters the chancel, a tradition which dates back to the Book of Common Prayer of 1549, although omitted in the version of 1552 (though still used in services of the time) it was later restored to the Book of Common Prayer in the reign of Queen Elizabeth I of England.
