= Ritual family =

Families of culturally and historically connected Christian rituals

Rites (Latin: ritus), liturgical rites, and ritual families within Christian liturgy refer to the families of liturgies, rituals, prayers, and other practices historically connected to a place, denomination, or group. Rites often interact with one another, such as in liturgical Latinization, and contain subsets known as uses. There are two broad categories which ritual families fall into: Latin or Western rites associated with Western Christianity and Eastern rites associated with Eastern Christianity. The most common rite is the Roman Rite, itself a Latin liturgical rite and further subdivided into several uses.

== Definition ==
The word rite is often used to describe particular Christian rituals. Rite has also come to refer to the full pattern of worship associated with a particular Christian denomination or tradition, typically comprising the liturgies for the Eucharistic celebration, canonical hours, and sacramental rites. Rites typically result from local variations and traditions, sometimes becoming further distinguished as uses of ritual families. Some ritual families originated with the early focal points of Christianity, such as Rome (Roman Rite), Alexandria (Alexandrian liturgical rites), and Antioch (East and West Syriac Rites). The Roman Rite of the Catholic Church is further subdivided between the liturgies from the post-Second Vatican Council period, such as the Mass of Paul VI and Liturgy of the Hours, and the pre-conciliar liturgies, such as the Tridentine Mass and Divine Office according to the Roman Breviary.

Some Christian denominations encompass multiple ritual families. The Catholic Church utilizes the various Latin liturgical rites of the Latin Church alongside the rites that compose Eastern Catholic liturgy. The use of those liturgical rites are determined by the particular church of the celebrating clergy; other Catholic rites are associated with Catholic religious orders, such as the Dominican Rite and Carmelite Rite. The liturgical rites of the Eastern Catholic Churches are often distinct from the same rites as practiced by non-Catholic denominations, sometimes as the result of Liturgical Latinization. Within Eastern Orthodoxy, the Byzantine Rite – including the Liturgy of Saint John Chrysostom and Byzantine adaption of the Liturgy of Saint Mark – is predominant, with some limited usage of the Western Rite.

== See also ==
- Book of Common Prayer
- Catholic liturgy
- Protestant liturgy
