= Claude Vaussin =

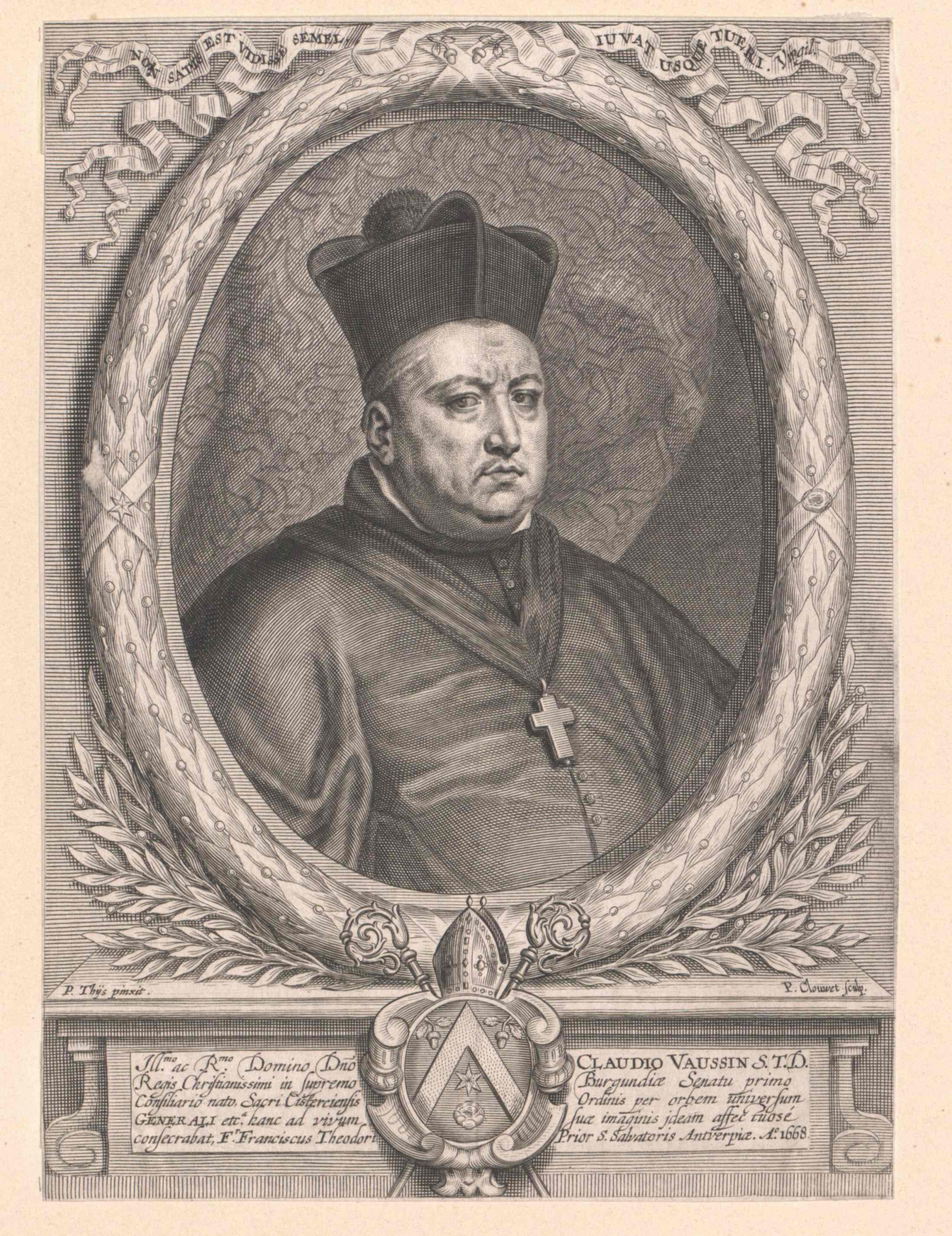
Claude Vaussin

Claude Vaussin (* 1608 – 1 February 1670) was abbot of Cîteaux from 1643/1645 until 1670, and as such, Abbot General of the Cistercian Order.

== Election as Abbot General ==
On 2 January 1643, when he was not yet 37 years old, Dr. Claude Vaussin was elected abbot of Cîteaux. He came from an influential but non-aristocratic family in Dijon, had become a monk in Clairvaux and later served as Prior in Froidmont Abbey. He was the successor of none other than the infamous Cardinal Richelieu, who had let himself be elected to this position in 1635 in order to manipulate the warring factions in the Cistercian Order to his personal benefit. Many abbots did not accept his election.

Claude Vaussin's election was rejected by the Reform movement; yet after his election had been investigated and repeated, Vaussin emerged on 10 May 1645 once again as the Abbot of Cîteaux and therefore Abbot General.

It took almost four years before Vaussin received confirmation from the Holy See and the King of France, finally allowing him to take office in Cîteaux in 1649. Although validly elected, he still faced opposition from the Strict Observance. They dominated the General Chapter of 1651 and were granted a certain amount of independence by being able to form their own congregation, but that was not enough: They wanted control of the Cistercian Order.

The ascetic measures initiated by the Strict Observance at the beginning of the 17th century had been encouraged by the French kings. In 1634, Cardinal La Rochefoucauld added his support to the movement, leading to much controversy and seemingly unending polemics; the War of Observances also had its political dimensions. Some supporters of the Strict Observance saw it as a way of dividing the Cistercian monks from the order's hierarchy, not least of all from the Vatican itself. The unity of the Order was in great danger.

== Accomplishments as Abbot General ==
Claude Vaussin used canonical visitations as a means of monitoring monastic life in Cistercian abbeys. He made two large trips through French monasteries as a visitor in 1648 and 1653. 1654 saw him visiting Swiss, German, Bohemian and Austrian abbeys. The "National Chapter" at Rottweil in 1654, during which Vaussin himself presided at, improved the unity of the Upper German Congregation within its own ranks and strengthen its ties to its mother abbey of Cîteaux. The German abbots became Vaussin's strongest allies in his conflicted relations to the French abbots of the Strict Observance.

The following abbatial elections in the primary abbeys of Clairvaux (1653) and La Ferté (1655) resulted in abbots who Vaussin had endorsed. But after 1656, the Strict Observance rose to new dominance. The French court continued their support, and in 1660, La Rochefoucauld declared the Reformed statutes to be binding. Vaussin canceled the General Chapter which had been called for 1661 and protested against the court's actions to the Vatican, traveling there personally in order to attain its retraction. Pope Alexander VII. (1655–1667) called a meeting of representatives of both observances to be held at Rome on 26 January 1662, (Feast of St. Alberic, Abbot of Cîteaux): Vaussin represented the Order, and the abbots Dominique Georges (Le Val-Richer Abbey) and Jean de Rancé (La Trappe Abbey) represented the Strict Observance. The result was the founding of a special commission to examine the dispute between the camps.

Several years later, the special commission produced the Apostolic Constitution of 19 April 1666 titled In suprema. It was accepted by all parties, including the Strict Observance. A General Chapter was held in 1667 and officially distributed and endorsed the text.

The General Abbot died after 24 years of service as the head of the Order, aged 63, in Dijon.

== Legacy ==
The next two General Chapters (1672 and 1683) continued to wrangle with the conflicts among monastic camps, until finally in 1683 the Chapter granted the Strict Observance the measure of autonomy that they had desired for so long.

Vaussin did not end the Cistercian War of Observances; however, he strengthened the international unity of the Order and prohibited the isolation of French abbeys from the rest of the Order. Vaussin was also influential in the reform of the Cistercian Rite, which had previously been spared from the Tridentine Reforms. Under his leadership, the liturgical books were adapted to the Roman Rite and distributed widely among the abbeys.
