= Catholic liturgy =

Customary public worship service

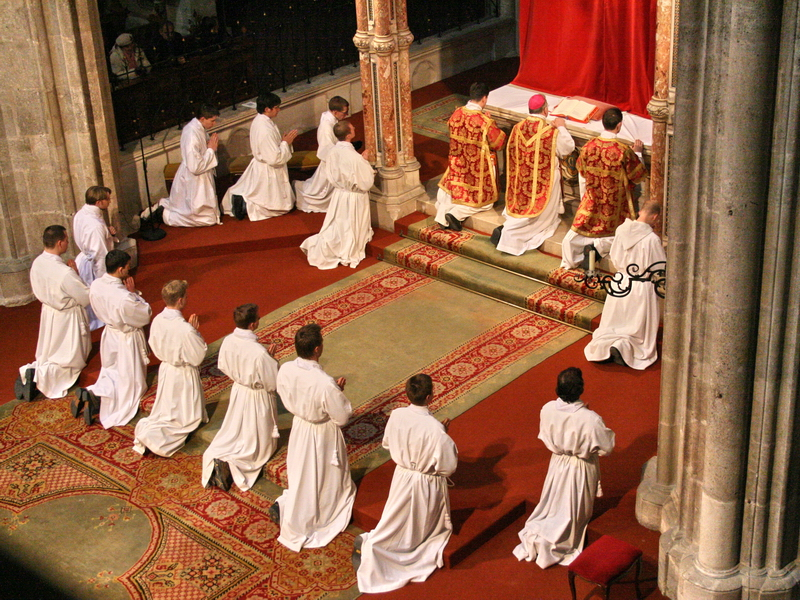
Celebration of the Passion of the Lord on Good Friday

Catholic liturgy means the whole complex of official liturgical worship, including all the rites, ceremonies, prayers, and sacraments of the Catholic Church, as opposed to private or collective devotions. In this sense the arrangement of all these services in certain set forms (including the canonical hours, administration of sacraments, etc.) is meant. Liturgy encompasses the entire service: prayer, reading and proclamation of the scriptures, singing, gestures, movement and vestments, liturgical colours, symbols and symbolic actions, the administration of sacraments and sacramentals.

== Etymology ==
Liturgy (from Greek: leitourgia) is a composite word meaning originally a public duty, a service to the state undertaken by a citizen. A leitourgos was "a man who performs a public duty", "a public servant", leitourgeo was "to do such a duty", leitourgema its performance, and leitourgia, the public duty itself. So in the use of liturgy meant the public official service of the church, which corresponded to the official service of the Temple in the Old Law.

== Liturgical principles ==
Catholic liturgies are broadly categorized as the Latin liturgical rites of the Latin Church and the Eastern Catholic liturgies of the Eastern Catholic Churches.

The Catholic Church understands liturgy not only to mean the celebration of the Holy Mass, but also the celebration of the Liturgy of the Hours, bible services, and the administration of sacraments and many sacramentals.

At the Second Vatican Council, the Council Fathers proclaimed the Constitution on the Sacred Liturgy, Sacrosanctum Concilium. There it says:

For the liturgy, "through which the work of our redemption is accomplished", most of all in the divine sacrifice of the Eucharist, is the outstanding means whereby the faithful may express in their lives, and manifest to others, the mystery of Christ and the real nature of the true Church.

The liturgy is considered as an exercise of the priestly office of Jesus Christ.

In the liturgy, the whole public worship is performed by the Mystical Body of Jesus Christ, that is, by the Head and His members.

The principle of cultural adaptation was put forward in the constitution, whereby "the genius and talents of the various races and peoples" are recognised, studied sympathetically and (where appropriate) reflected in local liturgical practices.

Numerous ecclesiastical documents call the Eucharist and the celebration of the Holy Mass the supreme act of worship and as the center of the liturgical life of the church, as Jesus Christ is the center of Catholic life and worship. The Council called the Eucharist the center and the summit: "The celebration of Mass, as the action of Christ and of the People of God arrayed hierarchically, is the center of the whole of Christian life for the Church both universal and local, as well as for each of the faithful individually."

The General Instruction on the Liturgy of the Hours states that, "as well as praising God, the church's liturgy expresses the hopes and prayers of all the Christian faithful and intercedes before Christ and through him before the Father for the salvation of the whole world.

As a result, the Catholic understanding of liturgy is not primarily about the precise regulation of individual sequences of rites, but rather about the essence of the church. Thus the Constitution on the Sacred Liturgy directs that

Pastors of souls must ... realize that, when the liturgy is celebrated, something more is required than the mere observation of the laws governing valid and licit celebration; it is their duty also to ensure that the faithful take part fully aware of what they are doing, actively engaged in the rite, and enriched by its effects.

The Codex Iuris Canonici, reflecting key principles from the Constitution on the Sacred Liturgy, expresses this in the following way:

The Church fulfills its sanctifying function in a particular way through the sacred liturgy, which is an exercise of the priestly function of Jesus Christ. In the sacred liturgy the sanctification of humanity is signified through sensible signs and effected in a manner proper to each sign. In the sacred liturgy, the whole public worship of God is carried out by the Head and members of the mystical Body of Jesus Christ.

The Council's Decree on the Apostolate of the Laity went on to commend Catholic families' participation in the liturgy together as a family, because where "the whole family makes itself a part of the liturgical worship of the Church", this is one aspect of the fulfilment of the mission given it by God.

Pope John Paul II sees one part of the role of liturgy as "instil[ling] a taste for prayer", while the Directory on popular piety and the liturgy sees liturgy and life as inseparable: "Were the Liturgy not to have its effects on life, it would become void and displeasing to God". The Catechism of the Catholic Church explains:

Liturgy is an "action" of the whole Christ (Christus totus). Those who even now celebrate it without signs are already in the heavenly liturgy, where celebration is wholly communion and feast.

== Liturgical year ==
Ecclesiastical writer Anselm Schott OSB compares the liturgical year to a church building: as the liturgical service is limited in space by the walls of the church, so the church year it is enclosed by certain holy times. The liturgical year is made up of holy seasons, weeks and days. "The exact determination of the holy times is a basic condition of communal liturgical celebration, because only the determination of the day and hour makes the union for worship possible. The establishment of holy times for worship is part of the original structure of the liturgy, and observing them is considered a primary Christian duty."

Apart from the liturgical seasons of the church year, the catholic liturgy knows ember days, rogation days and processions, services in the Roman station churches, votive masses and the feasts of Christ and his saints.

== Liturgical roles ==
In addition to ordained ministers, the Constitution on the Sacred Liturgy affirmed that liturgical participation by all the faithful is both a right and a duty. Roles highlighted include those of altar servers, lectors, commentators, and members of the choir, who all exercise "genuine liturgical functions". The role of a commentator is provided for in the General Instruction of the Roman Missal and was of greater importance when the revised liturgy was introduced after the Council, to explain what is happening and promote more active participation by members of the congregation; since the revised liturgy has become more familiar, such instruction is now less important.

Since the days of the apostles, singing has always transfigured the Christian liturgy. Gregorian chant, which "bears the stamp of holiness", is typical of the liturgy of the Roman Catholic Church. Pope Pius X and Pope Pius XI encouraged the singing of Gregorian chant by the people, "in order that the faithful may more actively participate in divine worship".

The 1967 document Musicam sacram, which implemented the Constitution on the Sacred Liturgy, repeatedly mentions facilitating the full, active participation of the congregation as called for by the Council, so that "unity of hearts is more profoundly achieved by the union of voices". Musicam Sacram states: "One cannot find anything more religious and more joyful in sacred celebrations than a whole congregation expressing its faith and devotion in song. Therefore the active participation of the whole people, which is shown in singing, is to be carefully promoted." It calls for fostering this congregational participation through attention to choice of song directors, to choice of songs, and to the nature of the congregation. It mentions the duty to achieve this participation on the part of choirs, choirs directors, pastors, organists, and instrumentalists.

To achieve full, active participation of the congregation, great restraint in introducing new hymns has proven most helpful. To this end also, the General Instruction of the Roman Missal recommends use of seasonal responsorial psalms and also keeping to a song that all can sing while processing to Communion, to "express the communicants' union in spirit by means of the unity of their voices, to show joy of heart, and to highlight more clearly the 'communitarian' nature of the procession to receive Communion".

== Liturgy of the Hours ==
The Liturgy of the Hours consecrates the whole course of day and night to God. Matins, Lauds and Vespers are major hours; little hours are Terce, Sext and None; Compline is the last canonical hour of the day.

Members of the consecrated life are officially assigned by the church to intone the liturgy of the hours. They, as well as bishops, priests, and deacons, are obliged to pray at least the main parts of the Liturgy of the Hours vicariously for the faithful. Communities of contemplative orders are obliged to pray the liturgy of hours in choir.

== Liturgical books and rubrics ==
The forms used in the Latin Church for the individual celebrations can be found in the liturgical books of the Roman Rite (Roman Missal, Rituale Romanum, Book of Hours, the Ceremonial of Bishops etc.) which were revised as part of the liturgical reform (and translated into the national languages). The Catholic liturgy also includes the liturgies of the various Eastern churches in communion with Rome, which follow their own oriental rites. The Constitution on the Sacred Liturgy also acknowledged scope for "legitimate variations and adaptations to different groups, regions, and peoples, especially in mission lands, provided that the substantial unity of the Roman rite is preserved". Furthermore, there are special forms of the Roman rite in various religious orders, for example the Carthusian Rite, the Cistercian Rite, the rite of the Dominicans and the Premonstratensians.

In 2018, the Liturgy Formation Subcommittee of the Bishops of England and Wales' Department for Christian Life and Worship oversaw the development and publication of a Study Guide to Catholic Liturgy, edited by Peter McGrail and Martin Foster. The Bishops' Liturgy Office observed that "an introductory 'text book' ... would be useful in many areas of the Church's life, including those preparing for ordination, priestly and diaconal, lay liturgical ministers, catechists and teachers in Catholic schools".

== Liturgy offices ==
The development of sound liturgical policies and resources, liturgical catechesis, the translation of liturgical texts and similar activities are undertaken by diocesan and national liturgy offices. For example, in New Zealand, each diocese a liturgy office which "provides support and training in liturgy for parishes, and to assist the bishop with diocesan liturgical celebrations", along with a National Liturgy Office based in Wellington.

== See also ==
- Catholic particular churches and liturgical rites
- Mass of Paul VI
- Pre-Tridentine Mass
- Tridentine Mass
- Catholic devotions
