= Collectarium =

Term in the Catholic Church

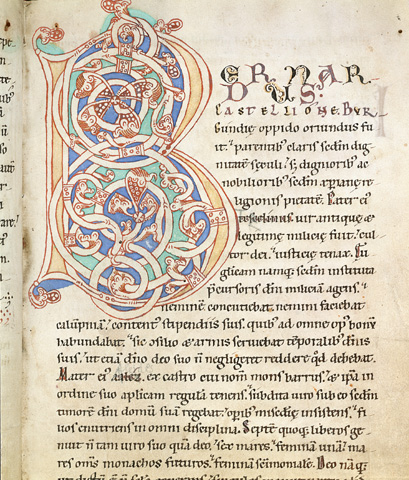
A page of an illuminated collectarium from Stična Abbey.

The Collectarium (also Collectarius, Collectaneum, Orationale, Capitulare), in the terminology of the Roman Catholic Church, is the book which contains the Collects.

== History ==
In the Proprium de Tempore of the Roman Missal the title Statio, with the name of some saint or mystery, is frequently prefixed to the Introit of the Mass.

Before going in procession to the statio clergy and people assembled in some nearby church to receive the pontiff, who recited a prayer which was called the Collect. This name was given to the prayer, either because it was recited for the assembled people, or because it contained the sum and substance of all favours asked by the pontiff for himself and the people, or because in an abridged form it represented the spirit and fruit of the feast or mystery.

In course of time it was used to signify the prayers, proper, votive, or prescribed by the ecclesiastical superiors (imperatæ), recited before the Epistle, as well as the Secrets and the Post-Communions. Later it was applied to the prayers said at Divine Office or any liturgical service.
