= Rite of Lyon =

Latin Church liturgical rite

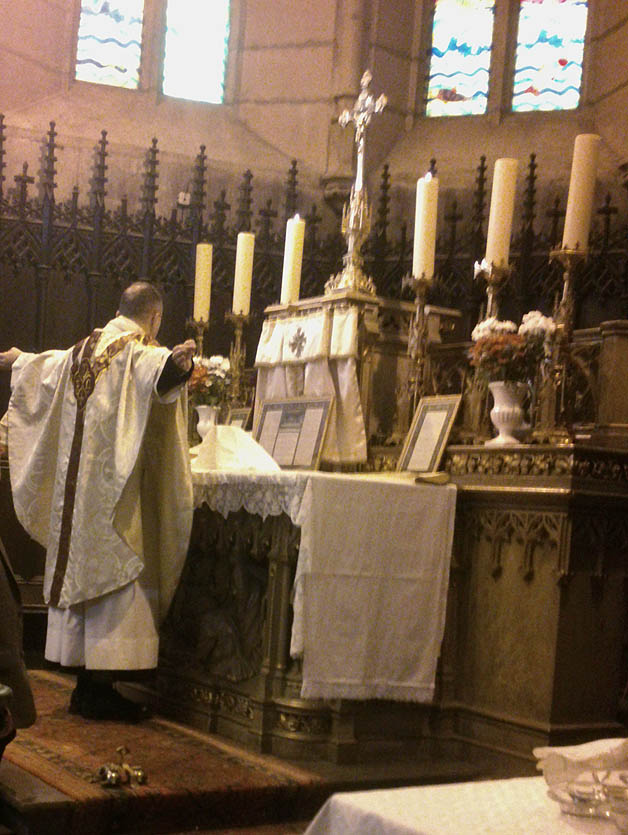
Read mass in the rite of Lyon, anamnesis. Note the freely standing altar, the celebrant extending his hands in modum crucis, and the chalice covered by the large corporal.

The Rite of Lyon (Latin: ritus Lugdunensis, sometimes ritus Romano-Lugdunensis; French: rite lyonnais) is a liturgical rite of the Latin Church once used generally in the Archdiocese of Lyon, now celebrated only in a few churches. It can be considered as the most ancient form of the Roman rite.

== History ==
Until the 8th century, the liturgy in Gaul was celebrated according to the Gallican Rite. In 789, it was suppressed and replaced with the Roman Rite by Charlemagne. The Lyonese Rite may be succinctly described as the Roman Rite as used in the 9th century with some Gallican elements; the texts are mainly Roman, whereas Gallican elements can be found especially in details of ceremonies. This Rite was kept with nearly no changes until the mid-eighteenth century. During the French Revolution, the Catholic cult in Lyon was suppressed. After, in the 19th century, the Lyonese Rite was restored only partly with some Roman elements introduced. It was, however, generally celebrated in the Archdiocese until the Second Vatican Council. There is no reformed version of the Rite. The old Rite is now celebrated only in a few churches, such as the Priestly Fraternity of Saint Peter's apostolate in Lyon.

== Description ==
=== Mass ===
The mass in the Lyon rite is similar to that of the pre-conciliar Roman rite (the Tridentine mass). Some major differences are listed below.

- The high altar must stand freely in the sanctuary (it cannot adhere to the wall), because during the solemn mass the deacon stands in front of the altar, but the subdeacon is behind the altar.
- Besides the five usual Roman liturgical colours (white, red, green, violet, black), grey is used for the weekdays of the Lent.
- A large corporal is used; not only the paten and the chalice are put thereon, but it covers the chalice from above as well.
- In the Lyon missal there are many sequences.
- In the solemn mass, the mingling of the water and wine in the chalice is done behind the altar when Alleluia is sung.
- In the solemn mass, after the first Agnus Dei, the antiphon Venite populi is sung; then the second and third Agnus Dei follow.
- Several times during the mass a "moderate genuflection" is prescribed. A movement similar to a genuflection is made, but without touching the ground with one's knee.

=== Office ===
The Roman Breviary is used, with diocesan propers. Besides the four usual Roman Marian antiphons (Alma Redemptoris Mater, Ave Regina caelorum, Regina caeli, Salve Regina) there is a fifth one, Virgo Parens Christi, for the Advent time.

=== Calendar ===
The Roman Calendar is used within the Lyon Rite with proper feasts, among which, the most important are: St. Pothinus, St. Irenaeus, and the anniversary of the consecration of the Primatial Church of Lyons. Local feasts are also celebrated, such as that of St. Joan of Arc.

== Bibliography ==
- Buenner, dom D. (O.S.B.) 1934. L'ancienne liturgie romaine: le rite lyonnais. (Lyon: Vitte)
- Cérémonial Romain-lyonnais publié par ordre de Monseigneur l’Archevêque de Lyon. XXXIV+594 pp. (Lyon: Vitte, 1897)
- King, A.A. 1957. Liturgies of the Primatial Sees. xiv+656 pp. Longmans, Green & Co.: London, New York, Toronto. [Chapter I, pp. 1–154, is about the rite of Lyon.]
- Missale Romanum, in quo antiqui ritus Lugdunenses servantur (Lugduni: Vitte, 1934)
