= Carmelite Rite =

Liturgical rite

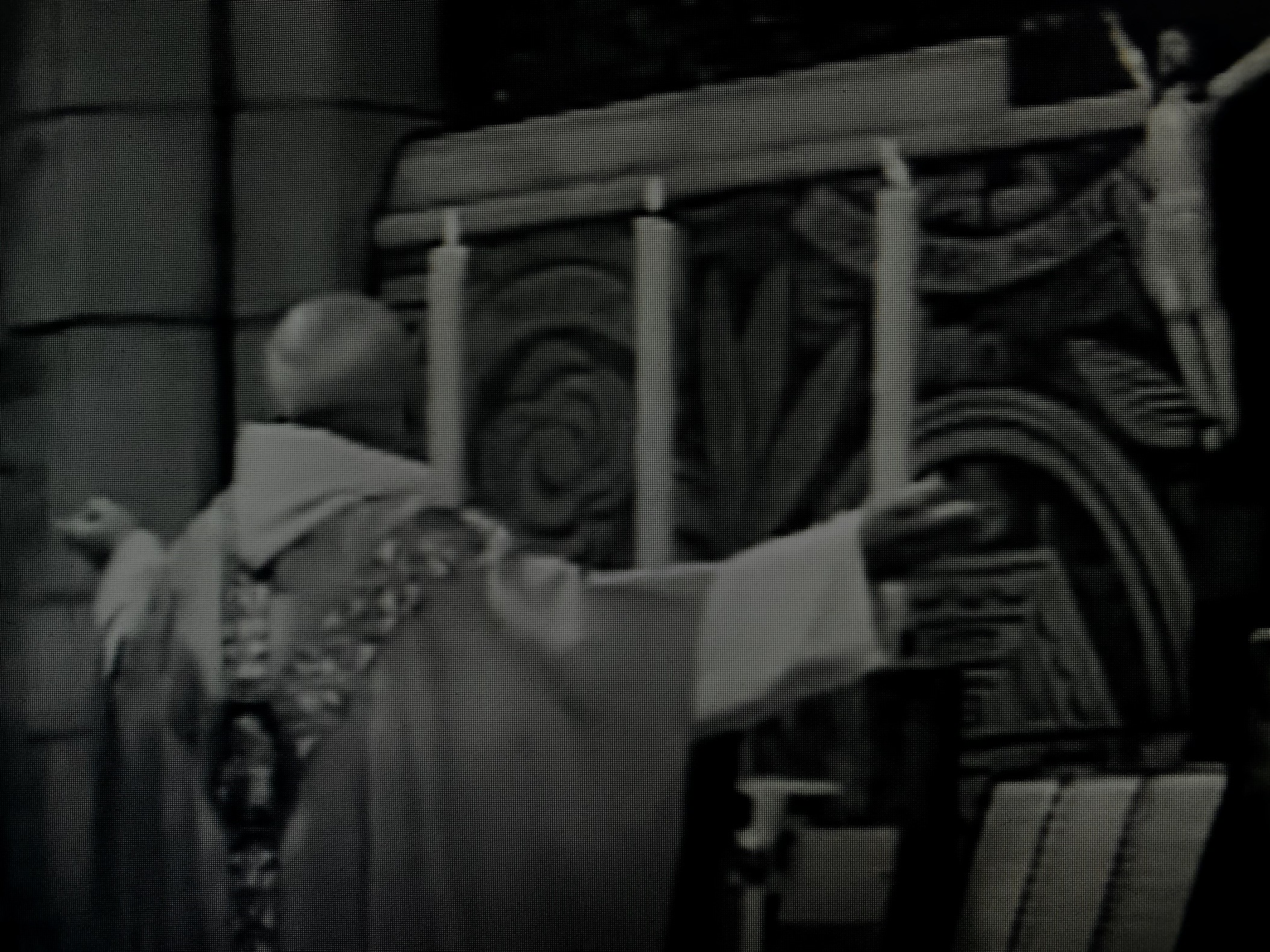
Father Malachy Lynch OCarm during the solemn mass in Carmelite rite

The Rite of the Holy Sepulchre, commonly called the Carmelite Rite, is the liturgical rite that was used by the Canons Regular of the Holy Sepulchre, Hospitallers, Templars, Carmelites and the other orders founded within the Latin Patriarchate of Jerusalem.

== History ==
The rite in use among the Carmelites beginning in about the middle of the twelfth century is known by the name of the Rite of the Holy Sepulchre, the Carmelite Rule, which was written about the year 1210, ordering the hermits of Mount Carmel to follow the approved custom of the Church, which in this instance meant the Patriarchal Church of Jerusalem: "Hi qui litteras noverunt et legere psalmos, per singulas horas eos dicant qui ex institutione sanctorum patrum et ecclesiæ approbata consuetudine ad horas singulas sunt deputati."

This Rite of the Holy Sepulchre was one of the many variations of the Roman Rite with additions from the earlier Gallican rites that came into existence after Charlemagne decreed that the whole of his realm adopt the Roman Rite; it appears to have descended directly from the Parisian Rite, but to have undergone some modifications pointing to other sources. The Sanctorale shows influence from Angers, the prose traces of meridional sources, while the lessons and prayers on Holy Saturday are purely Roman. The fact is that most of the clerics who accompanied the Crusaders were of French nationality; some even belonged to the Chapter of Paris, as is proved by documentary evidence. Local influence also played an important part. The Temple itself, the Holy Sepulchre, the vicinity of the Mount of Olives, of Bethany, of Bethlehem, gave rise to magnificent ceremonies, connecting the principal events of the ecclesiastical year with the very localities where the various episodes of the work of Redemption had taken place. The rite is known to us by means of some manuscripts one (Barberini 659 of A.D. 1160) in the Vatican library, another at Barletta, described by Kohler (Revue de I'Orient Latin, VIII, 1900–01, pp. 383–500) who ascribed it to about 1240.

The hermits on Mount Carmel were bound by rule only to assemble once a day for the celebration of Mass, the Divine Office being recited privately. Lay brothers who were able to read might recite the Divine Office, while others repeated the Lord's Prayer a certain number of times, according to the length and solemnity of the various offices. It may be presumed that on settling in Europe (from about 1240) the Carmelites conformed to the habit of the other mendicant orders with respect to the choral recitation or chant of the Divine Office, and there is documentary evidence that on Mount Carmel itself the choral recitation was in force at least in 1254.

The General Chapter of 1259 passed a number of regulations on liturgical matters, but owing to the loss of the acts their nature is not known. Subsequent chapters very frequently dealt with the rite chiefly adding new feasts, changing old established customs, or revising rubrics. An Ordinal, belonging to the second half of the thirteenth century, is preserved at Trinity College, Dublin, while portions of an Epistolarium of about 1270 are at the Maglia, becchiana at Florence (D6, 1787). The entire Ordinal was rearranged and revised in 1312 by Master Sibert de Beka, and rendered obligatory by the General Chapter, but it experienced some difficulty in superseding the old one. Manuscripts of it are preserved at Lambeth (London), Florence, and elsewhere. It remained in force until 1532, when a (committee was appointed for its revision; their work was approved in 1539, but published only in 1544 after the then General Nicholas Audet had introduced some further changes.

The reform of the Roman liturgical books under Pope Pius V called for a corresponding reform of the Carmelite Rite, which was taken in hand in 1580, the Breviary (Divine Office) appearing in 1584 and the Missal in 1587. At the same time the Holy See withdrew the right hitherto exercised by the chapters and the generals of altering the liturgy of the order, and placed all such matters in the hands of the Sacred Congregation of Rites. The publication of the Reformed Breviary of 1584 caused the newly established Discalced Carmelites (associated with Saint Teresa of Ávila and Saint John of the Cross) to abandon the ancient rite once for all and to adopt the Roman Rite instead.

Roughly speaking, the ancient Carmelite Rite of Mass stands about halfway between the Carthusian and the Dominican rites. It shows signs of great antiquity – e.g. in the absence of liturgical colours, in the sparing use of altar candles (one at low Mass, none on the altar itself at high Mass but only acolytes' torches, even these being extinguished during part of the Mass, four torches and one candle in choir for Tenebræ); incense is also used rarely and with noteworthy restrictions; the Blessing at the end of the Mass is only permitted where the custom of the country requires it; passing before the tabernacle, the brethren must make a profound inclination, not a genuflexion. Many other features might be quoted to show that the whole rite points to a period of transition. Already according to the earliest Ordinal, Communion is given under one species (i.e. bread, not wine), the days of general Communion being seven, later on ten or twelve a year with leave for more frequent Communion under certain conditions. Extreme Unction was administered on the eyes, ears, nostrils, mouth, both hands (the palms, with no distinction between priests and others) and the feet superius. The Ordinal of 1312 on the contrary orders the hands to be anointed exterius, but also without distinction for the priests; it moreover adds another anointing on the breast (super pectus: per ardorem libidinis).

In the Mass there were some peculiarities. The altar remained covered until the priest and ministers were ready to begin, when the acolytes then rolled back the cover; before the end of the Mass they covered the altar again. On great feasts the Introit was said three times, i.e. repeated both before and after the Gloria Patri; besides the Epistle and Gospel there was a lesson or prophecy to be recited by an acolyte. At the Lavabo the priest left the altar for the piscina where he said that psalm, or else Veni Creator Spiritus or Deus misereatur. Likewise after the first ablution he went to the piscina to wash his fingers. During the Canon of the Mass the deacon moved a fan to keep the flies away. At the word "fregit" in the form of consecration, according to the Ordinal of 1312 and later rubrics, the priest made a movement as if breaking the host. Great care was taken that the smoke of the thurible and of the torches did not interfere with the clear vision of the host when lifted up for the adoration of the faithful, but the chalice was only slightly elevated. The celebrating priest did not genuflect but bowed reverently. After the Pater Noster the choir sang Deus venerunt gentes, i.e., Psalm 78 (79), for the restoration of the Holy Land. The prayers for communion were identical with those of the Sarum Rite and other similar uses, viz. Domine sancte Pater, Domine Iesu Christe (as in the Roman Rite), and Salve salus mundi. The Domine non sum dignus was introduced only in 1568. The Mass ended with Dominus vobiscum, Ite missa est (or its equivalent) and Placeat. The chapter of 1324 ordered the Salve regina to be said at the end of each canonical hour as well as at the end of the Mass. The Last Gospel, which in both ordinals serves for the priest's thanksgiving, appears in the Missal of 1490 as an integral part of the Mass. On Sundays and feasts there was, besides the festival Mass after Terce or Sext, an early Mass (matutina) without solemnities, corresponding to the commemorations of the Office. From Easter till Advent the Sunday Mass was therefore celebrated early in the morning, the high Mass being that of the Resurrection of our Lord; similarly on these Sundays the ninth lesson with its responsory was taken from one of the Easter days; these customs had been introduced soon after the conquest of the Holy Land. A solemn commemoration of the Resurrection was held on the last Sunday before Advent; in all other respects the Carmelite Liturgy reflected more especially the devotion of the order towards the Blessed Virgin.

The Divine Office also presented some noteworthy features. The first Vespers of certain feasts and the Vespers during Lent had a responsory usually taken from Matins. Compline had various hymns according to the season, and also special antiphons for the Canticle. The lessons at Matins followed a somewhat different plan from those of the Roman Office. The singing of the genealogies of Christ after Matins on Christmas and the Epiphany gave rise to beautiful ceremonies. After Tenebræ in Holy Week (sung at midnight) came the chant of the Tropi; all the Holy Week services presented interesting archaic features. Other particularities were the antiphons Pro fidei meritis etc. on the Sundays from Trinity Sunday to Advent and the verses after the psalms on Trinity, the feasts of St. Paul and St. Laurence. The hymns were those of the Roman Office; the proses appear to be a uniform collection which remained practically unchanged from the thirteenth century to 1544, when all but four or five were abolished. The Ordinal prescribed only four processions in the course of the year: on Candlemas, Palm Sunday, the Ascension and the Assumption.

The calendar of saints, in the two oldest recensions of the Ordinal, exhibited some feasts proper to the Holy Land, namely some of the early bishops of Jerusalem, the Biblical Patriarchs Abraham, Isaac and Jacob, and Lazarus. The only special features were the feast of St. Anne, probably due to the fact that the Carmelites occupied for a short time a convent dedicated to her in Jerusalem (vacated by Benedictine nuns at the capture of that city in 1187), and the octave of the Nativity of Our Lady, which also was proper to the order. The Chapter of 1306 introduced the feasts of St. Louis, Barbara, Corpus Christi, and the Conception of Our Lady (in Conceptione seu potius veneratione sanctificationis B. V.); the Corpus Christi procession dated only from the end of the fifteenth century. In 1312 the second part of the Confiteor, which till then had been very short, was introduced. Daily commemorations of St. Anne and Saints Albert and Angelus dated respectively from the beginning and the end of the fifteenth century, but were transferred in 1503 from the canonical Office to the Little Office of Our Lady. The feast of the "Three Maries" dated from 1342, those of the Visitation, of Our Lady ad nives, and the Presentation from 1391.

Feasts of the order were first introduced towards the end of the fourteenth century – viz. the Commemoration (Scapular Feast) of 16 July appears first about 1386; Elisha prophet, and Cyril of Constantinople in 1399; St. Albert in 1411; St. Angelus in 1456. Owing to the printing of the first Breviary of the order at Brussels in 1480, a number of territorial feasts were introduced into the order, such as St. Joseph, the Ten Thousand Martyrs, the Division of the Apostle. The rapture of Elijah (17 June) is first to be found in the second half of the fifteenth century in England and Germany; the feast of the Prophet (20 July) dates at the earliest from 1551. Some general chapters, especially those of 1478 and 1564, added whole lists of saints, partly of real or supposed saints of the order, partly of martyrs whose bodies were preserved in various churches belonging to the Carmelites, particularly that of San Martino ai Monti in Rome. The revision of 1584 reduced the Sanctorale to the smallest possible dimensions, but many feasts then suppressed were afterwards reintroduced.

For singing, the Ordinal of 1312 allowed fauxbourdon, at least on solemn occasions; organs and organists are mentioned with ever-increasing frequency from the first years of the fifteenth century, the earliest notice being that of Mathias Johannis de Lucca, who in 1410 was elected organist at Florence; the organ itself was a gift of Johannes Dominici Bonnani, surnamed Clerichinus, who died at an advanced age on 24 October 1416.

== Current use ==
The Order of Discalced Carmelites was formally erected on 20 December 1593 by the Apostolic Constitution Pastoralis officii of Pope Clement VIII under its own Praepositus General, as such it had no formal relationship with the Carmelite rite. Although many of its early members had formerly been friars of the Province of Castille, still against the recommendations of St. John of the Cross who voted to keep the rite, the new order effectively eschewed the rite and adopted the Roman rite. The reason they gave was that the principles of the Tridentine liturgical reforms was the attempt to tidy up the particular rites of orders and primatial sees so that there was a greater conformity to Roman usage; this was not to stifle long-standing legitimate variation but to ensure that liturgy reflected theology (lex credendi, lex orandi).

After considering the question at its General Chapters of 1965, 1968 and 1971, the Order of Carmelites of the Ancient Observance (formerly styled "calced") decided in 1972 to abandon its traditional rite in favour of the Mass of Paul VI. Over the last decade or so, a group of Carmelites living in North America (Lake Elmo, Minnesota and Christoval, Texas) adopted the eremitical life and have been experimenting with the new forms of the Carmelite rite according to the conciliar norms. The hermits see in it a return to something of the older usage, a liturgical pattern that is better suited in style and shape to the needs of a contemplative community that spends much longer in choir than the friars.

A number of Masses were celebrated according to the Carmelite Rite in July 2012 at St Joseph's Church, Troy, New York by Romaeus Cooney. This represented the first time that the Carmelite Rite has been celebrated publicly in over forty years.

The Carmelite Rite is still offered regularly by the Carmelite Friars of St. Elias province of Middletown, NY. St. Joseph’s Church in Troy, NY continues to celebrate the Carmelite Rite on a regular basis.

The cloistered religious community of the Monks of the Most Blessed Virgin Mary of Mount Carmel in Wyoming celebrate mass according to the traditional Latin liturgy of the Carmelite Rite.

There was an ad experimentum revision of Holy Week that was published in 1953, issued by Kilian E. Lynch, then the prior general. The main Carmelite missal was never republished, but used by the Carmelite Order from 1937 (its last edition) until they gave up the rite in 1972.

== See also ==
- Latin liturgical rites
- List of Catholic rites and churches
