= Durham Rite =

English Christian ritual family

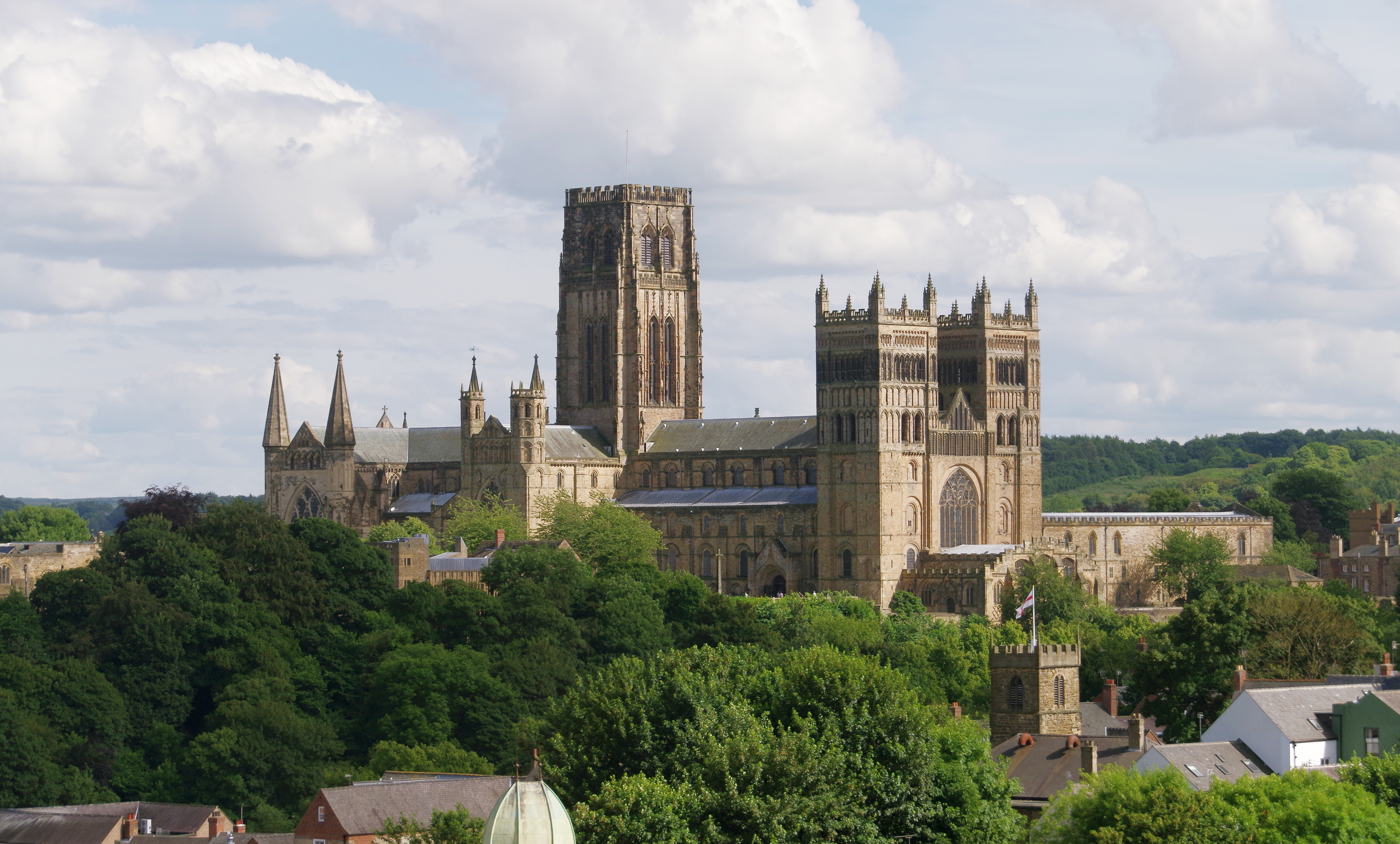
Durham Cathedral, from the north-west

The Durham Rite is a historical liturgical use of the Roman Rite and the Gallican Rite in the English bishopric of Durham.

== Antecedents and testimonies ==
The earliest document giving an account of liturgical services in the Diocese of Durham is the so-called "Rituale ecclesiæ Dunelmensis", also known as the "Ritual of King Aldfrith" [the King of Northumbria, who succeeded his brother Ecgfrith in 685, and who was a vir in scripturis doctissimus 'man most learned in the scriptures' (Bede, Historia ecclesiastica gentis Anglorum, IV, xxvi)]. The Manuscript (in the library of Durham cathedral, A, IV, 19) of the early ninth century contains capitula, chants and especially collects, from the Epiphany to Easter, then a proprium sanctorum, a commune sanctorum and many forms for blessings. The greater part has an interlinear Anglo-Saxon translation.

At the end various scribes have used up the blank pages to write out a miscellaneous collection of hymns and exorcisms and a list of contractions used in books of canon law. Its connexion with Durham and Northumberland is shown by various allusions, such as that to St. Cuthbert in a collect (intercedente beato Cudbertho Sacerdote; p. 185 of the Surtees Soc. edition). This fragment represents the fusion of the Roman and Gallican uses that had taken place all over North-Western Europe since the first Frankish Emperor Charlemagne (768-814) or even earlier (Duchesne, Origines du culte chrétien, 2nd ed., 89–99). Many parts of it exactly correspond to the Gregorian Sacramentary sent by Pope Adrian I to the emperor (between 784 and 791; Duchesne, op. cit., 114–119).

The great Benedictine monastery of Durham was founded by William of St. Carileph in 1083; he brought monks from Wearmouth and Jarrow to fill it who served the cathedral till the suppression in 1538. The foundation of the cathedral was laid in 1093 and St. Cuthbert's body was brought to its shrine in 1104. A catalogue drawn up at Durham in 1395 gives a list of the books used by the monks for various services. Of such books not many remain. A Gradual of about the year 1500 with four leaves of a Tonarium is at Jesus College, Cambridge (Manuscript 22; Q. B. S.), and a Durham Missal written in the fourteenth century is in the British Museum (Harl. 5289). The parts of this Missal that correspond to Holy Week and Easter are printed in vol. CVII of the Surtees Society's publications (pp. 172–191; see also the "Westminster Missal", III, 1424, Henry Bradshaw Soc., 1897, where the Durham variants are given).

But the most important document of this kind, the volume called "The Ancient Monuments, Rites and Customs of the Monastical Church of Durham before the Suppression", written in 1593, exists in several manuscript copies and has been printed and edited on various occasions, lastly by the Surtees Society (vol. CVII, 1903; see bibliography). It is a detailed description of the fabrica ecclesiae of the cathedral, but also of the various rites, ceremonies and special customs carried out by the monks who served it. It depicts the Durham Rite as practically that of the North of England (corresponding in all its main points to the Rite of York), with a few local modifications.

== Specifics ==
The treatise begins with a description of the famous nine altars (ed. Surtees Soc., p. 7) and of the choir and high altar. The Blessed Sacrament was reserved in a silver pelican hung over the High Altar. A pelican in her piety was assumed as his arms by Richard Fox (Bishop of Durham, 1494–1502) and was constantly introduced into monuments built by him (so at Winchester and at Corpus Christi College, Oxford). The great paschal candlestick was a conspicuous and splendid feature of Easter ritual at Durham; it and the rite of the paschal candle are described in chapter iv (ed. cit., p. 10). The Office for Palm Sunday does not differ from that of the Sarum Rite and the other English uses (ed. cit., p. 179). On Maundy Thursday there was a procession with St. Cuthbert's relics. A special feature of the Good Friday service was the crucifix taken by two monks from inside a statue of Our Lady, for the Creeping to the Cross. On the same day the Blessed Sacrament was enclosed in a great statue of Christ on a side altar and candles were burned before it till Easter Day. The Holy Saturday service in the Durham Missal is given on pp. 185–187 of the Surtees Society edition. The monks sang the "Miserere" while they went in procession to the new fire. When the paschal candle is lit they sing a hymn "Inventor rutili", with a verse that is repeated each time. There are only five Prophecies, followed by the litanies. When "Omnes Sancti" is sung those who are to serve the Mass go out. The word Accendite is said and the candles are lighted. It is repeated three times; at the third repetition the bishop comes out to begin the Mass. All the bells (signa) are rung at the Kyrie eleison, the Gloria and the Alleluia. Between three and four o'clock in the morning of Easter Day the Blessed Sacrament was brought in procession to the high altar, while they sang the antiphon "Christus resurgens ex mortuis, iam non moritur", etc. Another statue of Christ Risen remained on the high altar during Easter week. On Ascension Day, Whit-Sunday and Trinity Sunday processions went round the church, on Corpus Christi round the palace green and on St. Mark's Day to Bow Church in the city (chs. lv, lvi). The rogation-days (three cross-daies) also had their processions. In all these the relics of St. Bede were carried and the monks appeared in splendid copes. The prior especially wore a cope of cloth of gold so heavy that he could only stand in it when it was supported by "his gentlemen" (ed. cit., p. 85). The prior had the right of wearing a mitre since Prior Berrington of Walworth (ch. lvi, ed. cit., p. 107).

Throughout the year the chapter Mass was sung at nine o'clock, Vespers at three p. m. On Thursdays, except in Advent, Septuagesima and Lent, the Office of St. Cuthbert was sung in choir (ed. cit., p. 191). On Fridays there was a "Jesus-Mass" (a votive mass of the Holy Name) and the "Jesus-Antiphon" was sung after Complin (ed. cit., p. 220). This was also the custom at York, Lincoln, Lichfield and Salisbury. On St. Cuthbert's Day (20 March) there was naturally a great feast and his relics were exposed.

Chapter x (ed. cit., p. 16) describes the great book containing names of benefactors (Liber Vitæ) that was kept on the high altar, chapter xxi the forms for giving sanctuary to accused persons. They had to use the knocker, still shown to visitors, and when they were received, to wear a black gown with a yellow cross "of St. Cuthbert" on the left shoulder (ed. cit., p. 41). No woman was allowed to approach the saint's tomb beyond a line of blue marble traced on the floor. To explain this, chapter xviii tells a legend about a king's daughter who falsely accused him and was eventually swallowed up by the earth. In the "Galilee" was a chapel of Our Lady for women (ch. xxii, ed. cit., p. 42). When a monk died his body was carried to St. Andrew's chapel, two monks watched before it all the time; after the dirge and the requiem Mass it was buried in the sanctuary garth with a chalice of wax laid on the breast (ch. xxiii). Priors were buried in the abbey church (xxv) and bishops in the sanctuary (xxvii).

== See also ==
- Celtic Rite
