= Norbertine Rite =

Liturgical rite of the Catholic Church

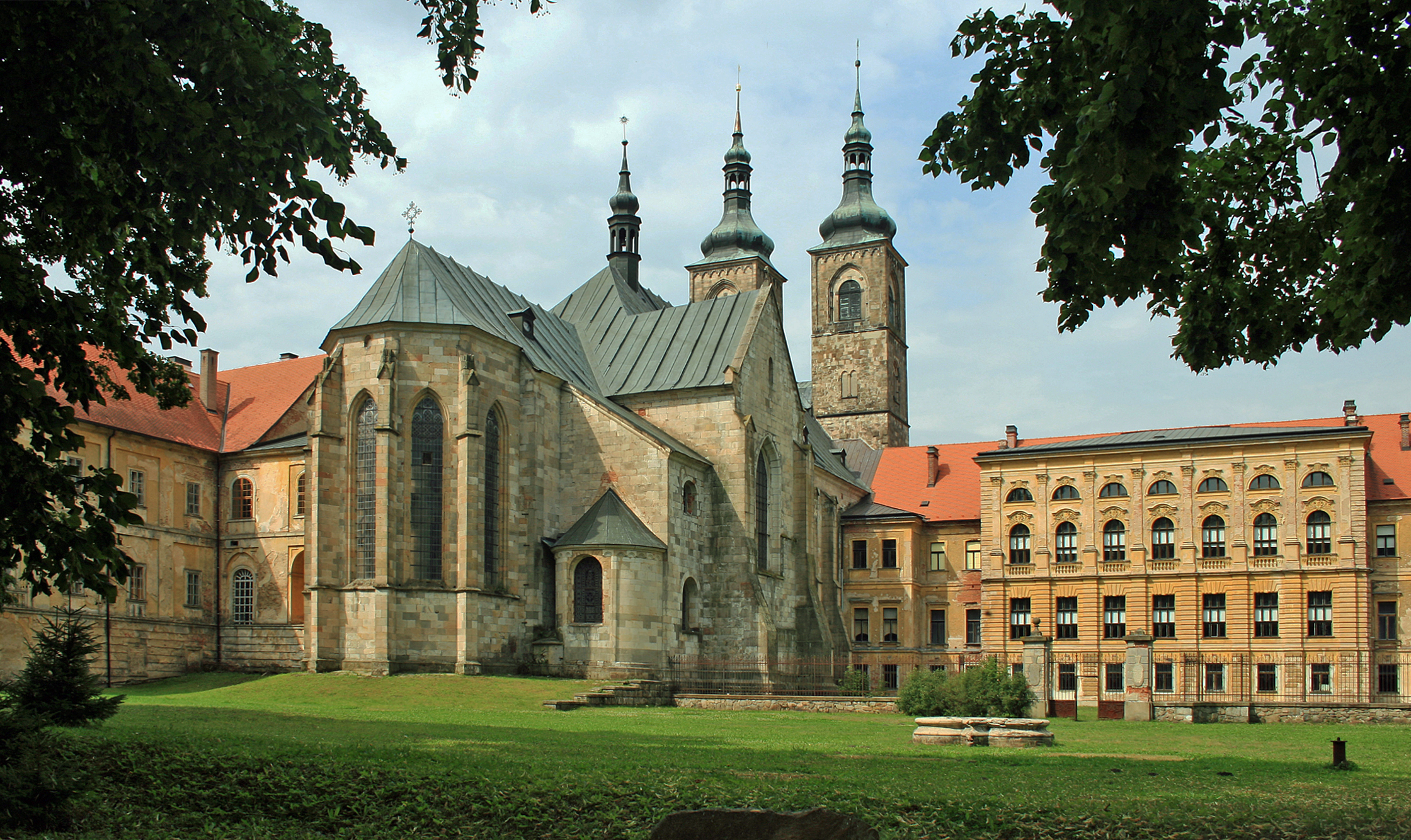
Monastery of Teplá

The Premonstratensian Rite or Norbertine Rite is the liturgical rite, distinct from the Roman Rite, specific to the Premonstratensian Order of the Roman Catholic Church.

== History ==
The Norbertine rite ("Norbertine" is another name for the Premonstratensians) differs from the Roman Rite in the celebration of Mass, the Liturgy of the Hours and the administration of the Sacrament of Penance.

Its liturgical books were reprinted by order of the general chapter held at Prémontré in 1738. A new edition of the Missal and the Breviary was issued after the General Chapter of Prague, in 1890. In 1902 a committee was appointed to revise the Gradual, Antiphonary etc. and was encouraged by the motu proprio of Pope Pius X on church music. The General Chapter of Tepla, Austria, in 1908, decided to edit the musical books of the order as prepared, in accordance with ancient manuscripts by this committee.

== Mass ==
The Premonstratensian Missal was not arranged like the Roman Missal. While the canon was identical, with the exception of a slight variation as to the time of making the sign of the cross with the paten at the "Libera nos", the music for the Prefaces etcetera differed, though not considerably, from that of the Roman Missal. Two alleluias were said after the "Ite missa est" for a week after Easter; for the whole of the remaining Paschal time one alleluia was said.

== Liturgy of the Hours ==
The Norbertine Breviary differed from the Roman Breviary, not only in its calendar (which is different for every order and diocese), but also in its arrangement and in the manner of reciting it. Some saints on the Roman calendar were omitted.

The principal community Mass and the Divine Office were celebrated with special solemnity during Easter Week and the vespers on these days concluded with a procession to the baptismal font.

Besides the daily recitation of the canonical hours Premonstratensians were obliged to say the Little Office of Our Lady, except on triple feasts and during octaves of the first class. In choir this was said immediately after the Liturgy of the Hours.

== Administration of the Sacrament of Penance ==
The form of absolution differed from the Roman Ritual. The following was the Norbertine formula: "Dominus noster Jesus Christus te absolvat, et ego auctoritate ipsius, mihi licet indignissimo concessa, absolvo te in primis, a vinculo excommunicationis ... in quantum possum et indiges", etc.
