= Dominican Rite =

Liturgical uses of the Catholic Church's Dominican Order

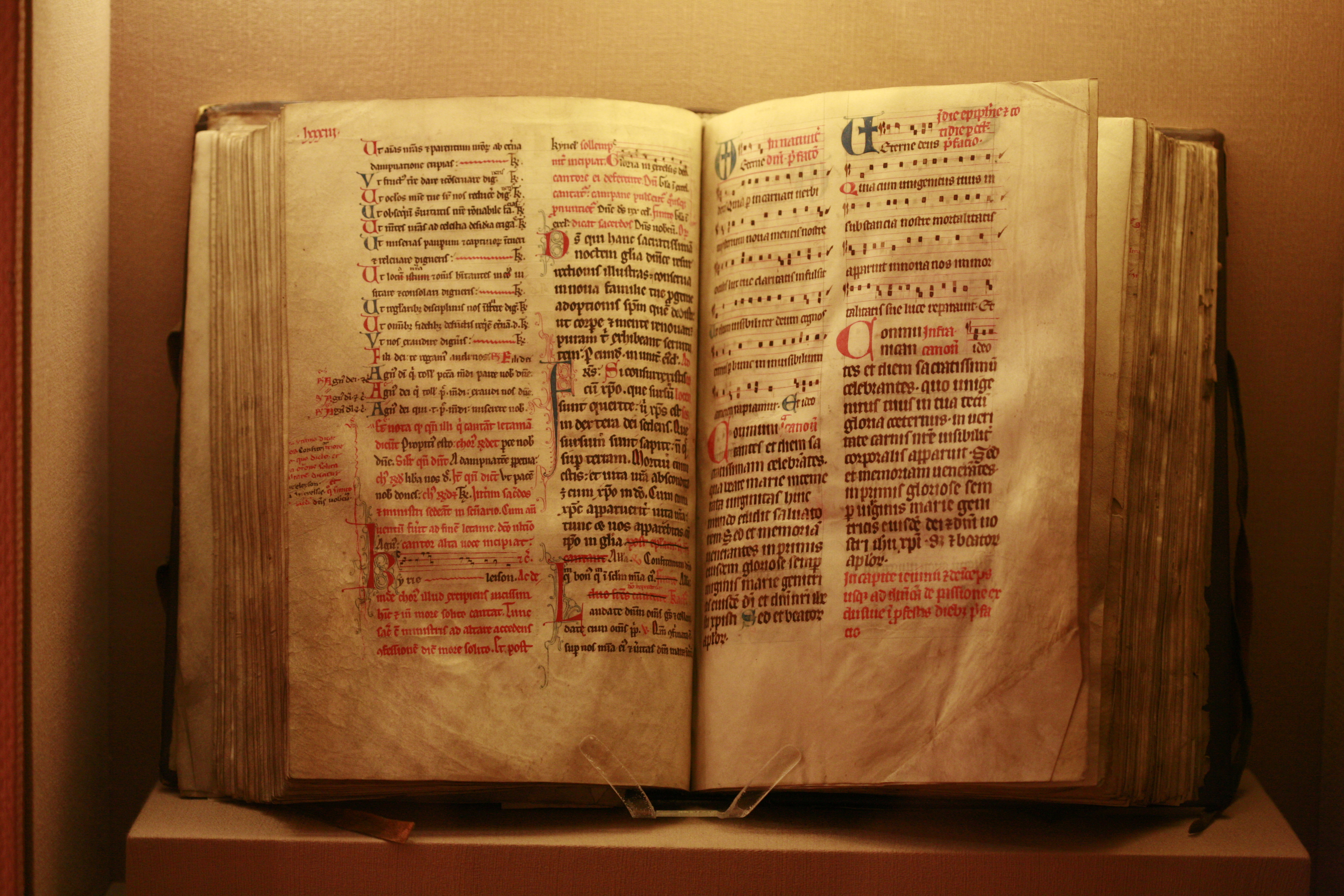
The missal of the Dominican convent of Lausanne, the oldest Dominican missal currently known. Copied around 1240, 16th-century binding. (Historical Museum of Lausanne)

The Dominican Rite is the unique liturgical rite of the Dominican Order in the Catholic Church. It has been classified differently by different sources – some consider it a usage of the Roman Rite, others a variant of the Gallican Rite, and still others a form of the Roman Rite into which Gallican elements were inserted.

The Dominican Order composed and adopted this rite in the mid-13th century as its specific rite. In 1968, it decided to adopt the revised Roman Rite of Mass and of the Divine Office, as soon as the texts revised after the Second Vatican Council appeared, but it has kept other elements of its proper rite, such as the Rite of Profession.

As a result, the Dominican Rite of the Mass ceased being celebrated as often after the revised Roman Rite was promulgated. However, in recent decades it has been offered occasionally in some provinces of the Dominican Order, and regularly in others. In addition, it is used by the Traditionalist Catholic Fraternity of St. Vincent Ferrer.

== Origin and development ==
The question of a special unified rite for the order received no official attention in the time of St. Dominic, each province sharing in the general liturgical diversities prevalent throughout the Church at the order's confirmation in 1216. Hence, each province and often each convent had certain peculiarities in the text and in the ceremonies of the Mass and the recitation of the Divine Office. The successors of St. Dominic were quick to recognize the impracticability of such conditions, and soon busied themselves in an effort to eliminate the distinctions. They maintained that the safety of a basic principle of community life—unity of prayer and worship—was endangered by this conformity with different local diocesan conditions. This belief was impressed upon them more forcibly by the confusion that these liturgical diversities occasioned at the general chapters of the order, where brothers from every province were assembled.

The first indication of an effort to regulate liturgical conditions was manifested by Jordan of Saxony, the successor of St. Dominic. In the Constitutions of 1228 ascribed to him are found several rubrics for the recitation of the Divine Office. These insist more on the attention with which the Liturgy should be said than on the qualifications of the liturgical books. However, it is said that Jordan took some steps in the latter direction and compiled one Office for universal use. Though this is doubtful, it is certain that his efforts were of little practical value, for the Chapters of Bologna (1240) and Paris (1241) allowed each convent to conform with the local rites. The first systematic attempt at reform was made under the direction of John of Wildeshausen, the fourth master general of the order. At his suggestion the Chapter of Bologna (1244) asked the delegates to bring to the next chapter (Cologne, 1245) their special rubrics for the recitation of the Divine Office, their Missals, Graduals and Antiphonaries, "pro concordando officio". To bring some kind of order out of chaos a commission was appointed consisting of four members, one each from the Provinces of France, England, Lombardy, and Germany, to carry out the revision at Angers. They brought the result of their labours to the Chapter of Paris (1246), which approved the compilation and ordered its exclusive use by the whole Order and approved the "Lectionary" which had been entrusted to Humbert of Romains for revision. The work of the commission was again approved by the Chapters of Montpellier (1247) and Paris (1248).

But dissatisfaction with the work of the commission was felt on all sides, especially with their interpretation of the rubrics. They had been hurried in their work, and had left too much latitude for local customs. The question was reopened and the Chapter of London (1250) asked the commission to reassemble at Metz and revise their work in the light of the criticisms that had been made; the result of this revision was approved at the Chapters of Metz (1251) and Bologna (1252) and its use made obligatory for the whole order. It was also ordained that one copy of the liturgical books should be placed at Paris and one at Bologna, from which the books for the other convents should be faithfully copied. However, it was recognized that these books were not entirely perfect, leaving room for further revision. Though this work was done under the direction of John the Teuton, the brunt of the revision fell to the lot of Humbert of Romains, then provincial of the Paris Province. Humbert was elected Master General of the Chapter of Buda (1254) and was asked to direct his attention to the question of the order's liturgical books. He subjected each of them to a most thorough revision, and after two years submitted his work to the Chapter of Paris (1256). This and several subsequent chapters endorsed the work, effected legislation guarding against corruption, constitutionally recognized the authorship of Humbert, and thus once and for all settled a common rite for the Order of Preachers throughout the world.

== Conservation until the twentieth century ==
Pope Clement IV, through the Dominican general, John of Vercelli, issued a Papal Bull in 1267 in which he lauded the ability and zeal of Humbert and forbade the making of any changes without the proper authorization. Subsequent papal regulation went much further towards preserving the integrity of the rite. Pope Innocent XI and Pope Clement XII prohibited the printing of the books without the permission of the master general and ordained that no member of the order should presume to use in his fulfilment of the choral obligation any book not bearing the seal of the general and a reprint of the pontifical Decrees. Another force preservative of the special Dominican Rite was the Decree of Pope Pius V (1570), imposing a common rite on the Western Church but excepting those rites which had been approved for two hundred years. This exception gave to the Order of Friars Preachers the privilege of maintaining its old rite, a privilege which the chapters of the order sanctioned and the members of the order gratefully accepted.

There were changes. Some slight corruptions crept in spite of the rigid legislation to the contrary. New feasts were added with the permission of the Roman Pontiffs and many new editions of the liturgical books were printed. Changes in the text, when made, were always effected with the idea of eliminating arbitrary mutilations and restoring the books to a perfect conformity with the old exemplars at Paris and Bologna. Such were the reforms of the Chapters of Salamanca (1551), Rome (1777) and Ghent (1871).

Several times movements were started with the idea of conforming with the Roman Rite, but were always defeated until after the Second Vatican Council, when the Order finally decided to adopt the Roman Rite, supplementing it with certain texts of the Dominican tradition (e.g. that for the blessing of palms on Palm Sunday, or that for the adoration of the Cross on Good Friday) and, of course, rituals for various moments in religious life, such as professions and anniversaries, such as every religious order uses without thereby setting up a distinct liturgical rite. The General Chapter of River Forest (1968) made this decision, which was applied first to the Mass and later to the Divine Office, in conformity to the spirit and letter of the Constitution Sacrosanctum Concilium. The permission to adopt the Roman liturgy, however, came with the stipulation that the master of the order, for all friars, and the provincials, for those subject to them, could grant permission to celebrate the traditional Dominican Rite Mass and Office; as such, in 1969, the Dominican Order received a rescript from the Holy See, which granted faculties for friars to celebrate the Dominican Rite in accordance with the revised 1965 Missal. It is debated if this faculty continues today. Furthermore, since Pope Benedict XVI's Summorum Pontificum and Universae Ecclesiae granting members of Religious Orders permission to use their own liturgical books which were in force in the year 1962, Dominicans may celebrate the Dominican Rite according to the 1933 Missal, with the revised Holy Week.

== Sources of the rite ==
To determine the sources of the Dominican Rite is to come face to face with the haze and uncertainty that seems to shroud most liturgical history. The 13th century knew no unified Roman Rite.

The Dominican Rite was not an entirely independent liturgical creation, but rather a systematic effort to harmonize and simplify the diverse liturgical practices in use during the first half of the 13th century. Its development reflected the Dominican Order's intention to establish a consistent liturgical usage across its communities while drawing upon the existing traditions of the Western Church. Although the rite incorporated elements associated with the Gallican tradition, its characteristics were not substantially different in this respect from other uses of the Gallico-Roman Rite during the same period.

While the basis of the usages of north-western Europe was a Gallicanized-Gregorian Sacramentary sent by Pope Adrian I to Charlemagne, each little locality had its own peculiar distinctions. At the time of the unification of the Dominican Rite most of the convents of the order were embraced within the territory in which the old Gallican Rite had once obtained and in which the Gallico-Roman Rite then prevailed. Blessed Jordan of Saxony, the pioneer in liturgical reform within the order, greatly admired the Rite of the Church in Paris and frequently assisted at the recitations of the Office at Notre-Dame. Humbert of Romans, who played so important a part in the unification, was the provincial superior of the French Province.

These facts justify the opinion that the basis of the Dominican Rite was the typical Gallican Rite of the 13th century, but documentary evidence that the rite was adapted from any one locality is lacking. The chronicles of the order state merely that the rite is neither the pure Roman nor the pure Gallican, but based on the 13th-century Roman usage, with additions from the Rites of Paris and other places where the order existed. Just from where these additions were obtained and exactly what they were cannot be determined, except in a general way, from an examination of each distinctive feature.

The Dominican Rite, formulated by Humbert, saw no radical development after its confirmation by Pope Clement IV. When Pope Pius V made his reform, the Dominican Rite had been fixed and stable for over three hundred years, while a constant liturgical change had been taking place in other communities. Furthermore, the comparative simplicity of the Dominican Rite, as manifested in the different liturgical books, gives evidence of its antiquity.

== Languages ==
The rite was originally in Latin, but some vernaculars were allowed:

- In the 14th century, Dominican missionaries converted a monastery near Qrna, Armenia to Catholicism, and translated the liturgical books of the Dominican Rite into Armenian for the community's use. The monks were deterred from becoming members of the Dominican Order itself by the severe fasting requirements of the Dominican Constitutions, as well as the prohibition on owning any land other than that on which the monastery stood, and therefore became the Order of the United Friars of St. Gregory the Illuminator, a new order confirmed by Pope Innocent VI in 1356 whose Constitutions were similar to the Dominicans' except for these two laws. This order established monasteries over a vast amount of territory in Greater and Lesser Armenia, Persia, and Georgia, using the Dominican Rite in Armenian until the end of the order's existence in 1794.
- On February 25, 1398, Pope Boniface IX also authorized Maximus Chrysoberges to found a monastery in Greece where Mass would be celebrated in Greek according to the Dominican Rite, and Manuel Chrysoloras translated the Dominican missal into Greek in pursuance of the plan, but nothing further is known of this undertaking.

== Liturgical books ==
The rite compiled by Humbert contained fourteen books: (1) the Ordinary, a sort of an index to the Divine Office, the Psalms, Lessons, Antiphons and Chapters being indicated by their first words. (2) The Martyrology, an amplified calendar of martyrs and other saints. (3) The Collectarium, a book for the use of the hebdomidarian, which contained the texts and the notes for the prayers, chapters, and blessings. (4) The Processional, containing the hymns (text and music) for the processions. (5) The Psalterium, containing merely the Psalter. (6) The Lectionary, which contained the Sunday homilies, the lessons from Sacred Scripture and the lives of the saints. (7) The Antiphonary, giving the text and music for the parts of the Office sung outside of the Mass. (8) The Gradual, which contained the words and the music for the parts of the Mass sung by the choir. (9) The Conventual Missal, for the celebration of solemn Mass. (10) The Epistolary, containing the Epistles for the Mass and the Office. (11) The Book of Gospels. (12) The Pulpitary containing the musical notation for the Gloria Patri, the Invitatory, Litanies, Tracts and the Alleluia. (13) The Missal for a private Mass. (14) The Breviary, a compilation from all the books used in the choral recitation of the Office, very much reduced in size for the convenience of travellers.

By a process of elimination and synthesis undergone with the books of the Roman Rite many of the books of Humbert became superfluous, while several others were formed. These added nothing to the original text, but merely provided for the addition of feasts and the more convenient recitation of the office. The collection of the liturgical books then contained: (1) Martyrology; (2) Collectarium; (3) Processional; (4) Antiphonary; (5) Gradual; (6) Missal for the conventual Mass; (7) Missal for the private Mass; (8) Breviary; (9) Vesperal; (10) Horæ Diurnæ; (11) Ceremonial. The contents of these books followed closely the books of the same name issued by Humbert described above. The new ones were: (1) the Horæ Diurnæ (2) the Vesperal (with notes), adaptations from the Breviary and the Antiphonary respectively (3) the Collectarium, a compilation from all the rubrics scattered throughout the other books. With the exception of the Breviary, these books were similar in arrangement to the correspondingly named books of the Roman Rite. The Dominican Breviary was divided into Part I, Advent to Trinity, and Part II, Trinity to Advent. Also, unlike the Tridentine usage of the Roman rite and similar to the Sarum rite and other Northern European usages of the Roman rite, the Dominican Missal and Breviary counted Sundays after Trinity rather than Pentecost.

== Distinctive marks of the Dominican Rite ==
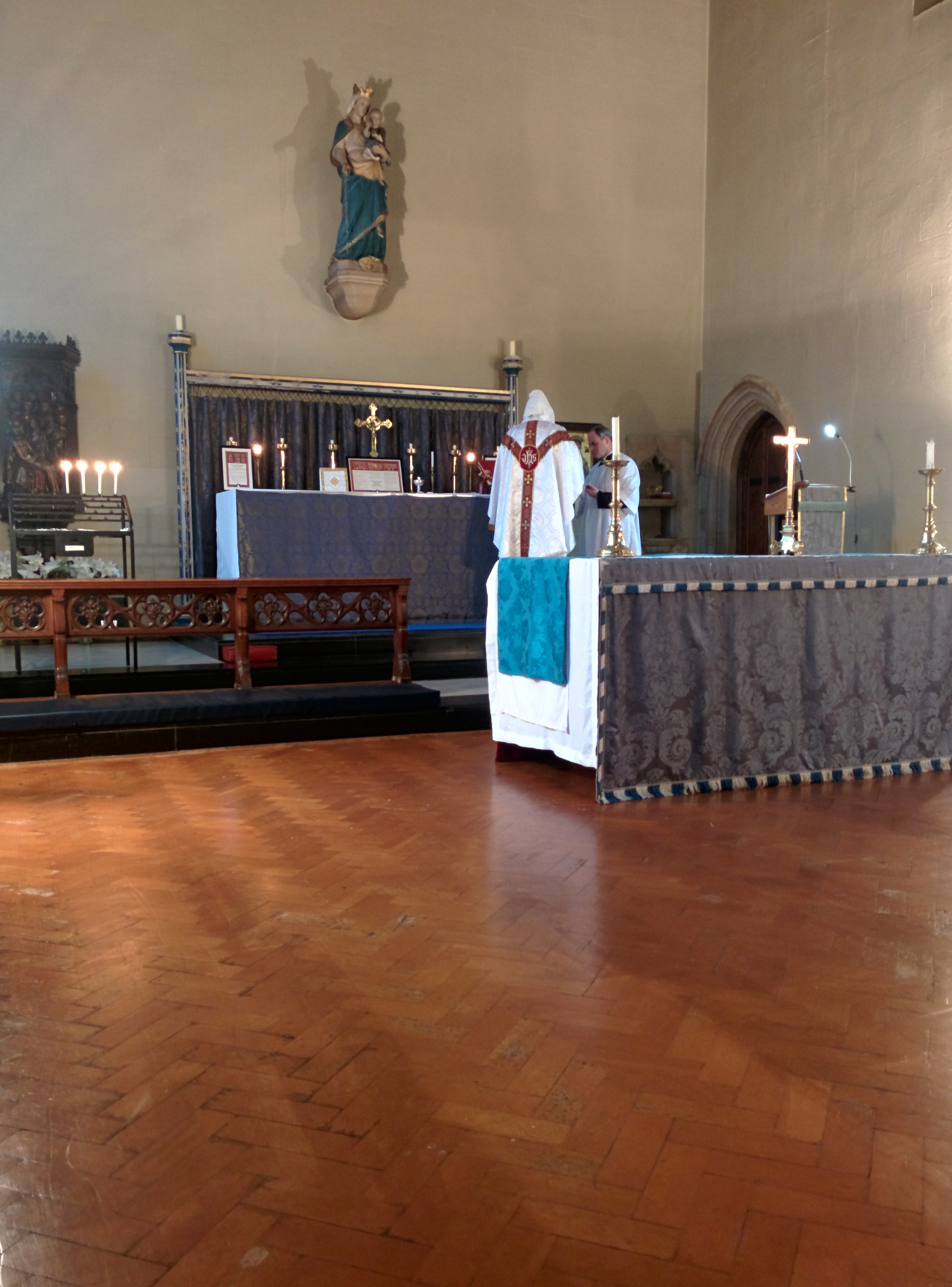
Dominican Rite Low Mass at Holy Cross Priory Church in Leicester, UK. The chalice is prepared before the prayers at the foot of the altar. The priest can clearly be seen wearing the amice over his head.

Only the most striking differences between the Dominican Rite and the Roman are mentioned here. The most important is in the manner of celebrating a low Mass. The celebrant in the Dominican Rite wears the amice over his head until the beginning of Mass, and prepares the chalice as soon as he reaches the altar. He says neither the "Introibo ad altare Dei" nor the Psalm "Judica me Deus", instead saying "Confitemini Domino quoniam bonus", with the server responding "Quoniam in saeculum misericordia ejus" ("Praise the Lord for He is good; For His mercy endureth forever."). The Confiteor, much shorter than the Roman, contains the name of St. Dominic.

The Gloria and the Credo are begun at the centre of the altar and finished at the Missal or the presider's sedilia. At the Offertory there is a simultaneous oblation of the Host and the chalice and only one prayer, the "Suscipe Sancta Trinitas". The Canon of the Mass is the same as the Canon of the Roman Rite, but the priest holds his hands and arms differently—for some parts of the Canon, his hands are folded, and immediately after the consecration, for the "Unde et Memores", he holds his arms in a cruciform position. The words of Consecration, however, is different to that of the Roman counterpart.

The Dominican celebrant also says the "Agnus Dei" immediately after the "Pax Domini" and then recites the prayers "Hæc sacrosancta commixtio", "Domine Iesu Christe" and "Corpus et sanguis", after which follows the Communion, the priest receiving the Host from his left hand. No prayers are said at the consumption of the Precious Blood, the first prayer after the "Corpus et Sanguis" being the Communion.

In a solemn Mass the chalice is brought in procession to the altar during the Gloria, and the corporal is unfolded by the deacon during the singing of the Epistle. The chalice is prepared just after the subdeacon has sung the Epistle, with the ministers seated at the Epistle side of the sanctuary. The chalice is brought from the altar to the place where the celebrant is seated by the subdeacon, who poured the wine and water into it and replaced it on the altar. During important feasts, a procession occurs to offer the gifts to the deacon during the offertory—a gesture not found in the Tridentine Missal, but was done by early liturgies, and was restored in the most recent reforms of the Roman Rite by Pope Paul VI. The incensing of the ministers occurs during the singing of the Preface. Throughout the rite the ministers also stand or move into various patterns rather different from those of the old Roman Liturgy.

The Dominican Breviary differs somewhat from the Roman. The Offices celebrated are of seven classes: of the season (de tempore), of saints (de sanctis), of vigils, of octaves, votive offices, Office of the Blessed Virgin, and Office of the Dead. The order of the psalms is different from the Roman use in the canonical hours, having a different selection of psalms at Prime, and in Paschal time providing only three psalms and three lessons instead of the customary nine psalms and nine lessons. The Office of the Blessed Virgin is said on all days on which feasts of the rank of duplex or "totum duplex" were not celebrated. The Gradual Psalms are said on all Saturdays on which the votive Office of the Blessed Virgin is said and were added to the psalms of Prime during Lent. The Office of the Dead is said once a week except during the week following Easter and the week following Pentecost. Other minor points of difference are the manner of making the commemorations, the text of the hymns, the Antiphons, the lessons of the common Offices and the insertions of special feasts of the order.

There are some differences between the musical notation of the Dominican Gradual, Vesperal and Antiphonary and the corresponding books of the Roman Rite as reformed by Pope Pius X. The Dominican chant was faithfully copied from the 13th-century manuscripts, which were in turn derived indirectly from the Gregorian Sacramentary. There is therefore remarkable similarity between the Dominican chant and the restored Roman chant, although the Dominican books generally do not use some of the modern notation pioneered by the Abbey of Solesmes (for example, dotted neumes to indicate the lengthening of a note are not found in the Dominican books).
