= Orate fratres =

Latin phrase

Orate fratres is the incipit of a request for prayer that the priest celebrating Mass of the Roman Rite addresses to the faithful participating in it before saying the Prayer over the Offerings, formerly called the Secret. It thus corresponds to the Oremus said before the Collect and the Postcommunion, and is an expansion of those shorter exhortations. It has gone through several alterations since the Middle Ages.

== Description ==
=== Celebrant's exhortation ===
The full text of the celebrant's exhortation is: Orate, fratres, ut meum ac vestrum sacrificium acceptabile fiat apud Deum Patrem omnipotentem. The English translation is Pray, brethren (brothers and sisters), that my sacrifice and yours may be acceptable to God, the almighty Father. The earlier (1973) ICEL translation has "our sacrifice" in place of "my sacrifice and yours".

This exhortation is a reminder to the people that the sacrifice being offered is not the priest's alone but theirs also ("my sacrifice and yours"). Many old versions have equally yours (Latin: partiter vestrum.)

The words of the exhortation are the same as in the editio princeps of the Roman Missal issued by Pope Pius V in 1570. At a later stage, editions of the Tridentine Roman Missal introduced a rubric absent in the original, directing the priest to say the Orate fratres exhortation with his voice "raised a little" (voce paululum elevata). A proof that it was not an integral part of the old Roman Mass is that it is always said, not sung, aloud, like the Tridentine Mass prayers at the foot of the altar, last Gospel etc. Adrian Fortescue remarked: "Certainly nowhere is the whispered voice so anomalous as here, where we address the people. If the Orate fratres were an old integral part of the Mass, it would of course be sung loud."

The rubric in the Tridentine editions of the Roman Missal directs the priest, if not already facing the people, to turn to them, say "Orate, fratres" in a low voice while extending and joining his hands, and then turn back to the altar while reciting the rest of the invitation inaudibly. It is the only occasion when those editions tell him to turn back to the altar by completing a clockwise 360° turn, unlike the other occasions, when according to the same editions, he reverses his turning to the people.

The limitation of the voice and the silent recitation of most of the request for prayer was removed in the 1970 edition. A rubric that remains directs the priest, when making the request, to stand at the middle of the altar, facing the people, and to extend then join his hands. In the editions published since 1970 this is the second occasion during the celebration of Mass on which he is explicitly directed to face the people. In earlier editions it was the third occasion.

=== Congregational response ===
The congregation responds to the celebrant, saying: Suscipiat Dominus sacrificium de manibus tuis, ad laudem et gloriam nominis sui, ad utilitatem quoque nostram, totiusque Ecclesiae suae sanctae. The English translation is May the Lord accept the sacrifice at your hands for the praise and glory of his name, for our good and the good of all his holy Church. The earlier (1973) translation omitted the word "holy".

The original Tridentine Roman Missal included the word "Amen" as an integral part of this response at the end and directed that the whole response ("Amen" included) be said by "the bystanders or else by the priest himself" (Circumstantes respondent: alioquin ipsemet sacerdos). Later editions removed the "Amen" from the response and directed the priest to say the "Amen" himself in a low voice (submissa voce). In the rubric it added "the server or" before "the bystanders" (Minister, seu circumstantes respondent: alioquin ipsemet Sacerdos). Since 1970, editions of the Roman Missal assign the response to the people or, in Masses celebrated without the people, to the server, and speak of an "Amen" at this point only in response to the Prayer over the Offerings.

The response of the people emphasizes both the distinction and the similarity between the priest's sacrifice at the altar and that of the faithful.

== Other rites and uses ==
The Jacobite rite has an almost identical form before the Anaphora; the Nestorian celebrant says: "My brethren, pray for me". Such invitations, often made by the deacon, are common in the Eastern rites. The Gallican rite had a similar one. The Mozarabic rite invitation at this place is: "Help me brethren by your prayers and pray to God for me". Many of the old Roman prayers over the offerings contain the same ideas. It is not used in the old Ambrosian rite.

The first millennium precursors include:

- Orate fratres, ut vestrum pariter et nostrum sacrificium acceptabile fiat Deo. (Amiens, c. 750)
- Orate pro me, fratres et sorores, ut meum pariter et vestrum sacrificium sit acceptum in conspectu Domini. (St Denis, late 800s)
- Orate pro me misero peccatore ad Dominum nostrum Iesum Christum, ut meum sacrificium ac vestrum sit acceptabile in conspectu divinæ pietatis. (Séez c. 1000)
- Orate pro me, fratres, ut meum sacrificium et vestrum fiat acceptabile ante conspectum Domini. (Use of Lyon)

The second millennium medieval derived uses of the Roman Rite had a similar formulation (with a different response.) For the Use of Sarum it was:

Pray, brothers and sisters, for me, that my sacrifice, which is equally yours, may be accepted by the Lord, our God. Latin: Orate fratres et sorores, pro me, ut meum pariterque vestrum acceptum sit Domino Deo nostro sacrificium.

For the Use of York it was:

Pray, brothers and sisters, for me a sinner, that the sacrifice, mine and yours not less, may be accepted by the Lord our God.

— Latin: Orate fratres et sorores, pro me peccatore, ut meum pariterque vestrum Domino Deo acceptum sit sacrificium.

A version closer to the Dominican version has also been given:

Pray, brethren, to the Lord, that my sacrifice, which is equally yours, may be accepted in the sight of the Lord. Latin: Orate fratres ad Dominum, ut meum pariter et vestrum in conspectu Domini acceptum sit sacrificium.

Other versions include

- Orate, fratres, pro me peccatore: ut meum pariter ac vestrum in conspectu Domini acceptabile fiat sacrificium (Cistercian).
- Orate, fratres, pro me peccatore, ad Dominum Deum nostrum (Carthusian)
- Orate pro me, fratres et sorores, et ego pro vobis, ut meum pariter et vestrum in conspectu Domini sit acceptum sacrificium (Paris).
- Orate pro me, fratres et sorores, et ego pro vobis: ut meum vestrumque sacrificium acceptabile fiat ante conspectum Domini (Sens).
- Orate pro me, fratres, ut meum pariterque vestrum Deo sit acceptabile sacrificium (Knights Hospitaller).
