= Secret (liturgy) =

Prayer said in a low voice by the priest or bishop

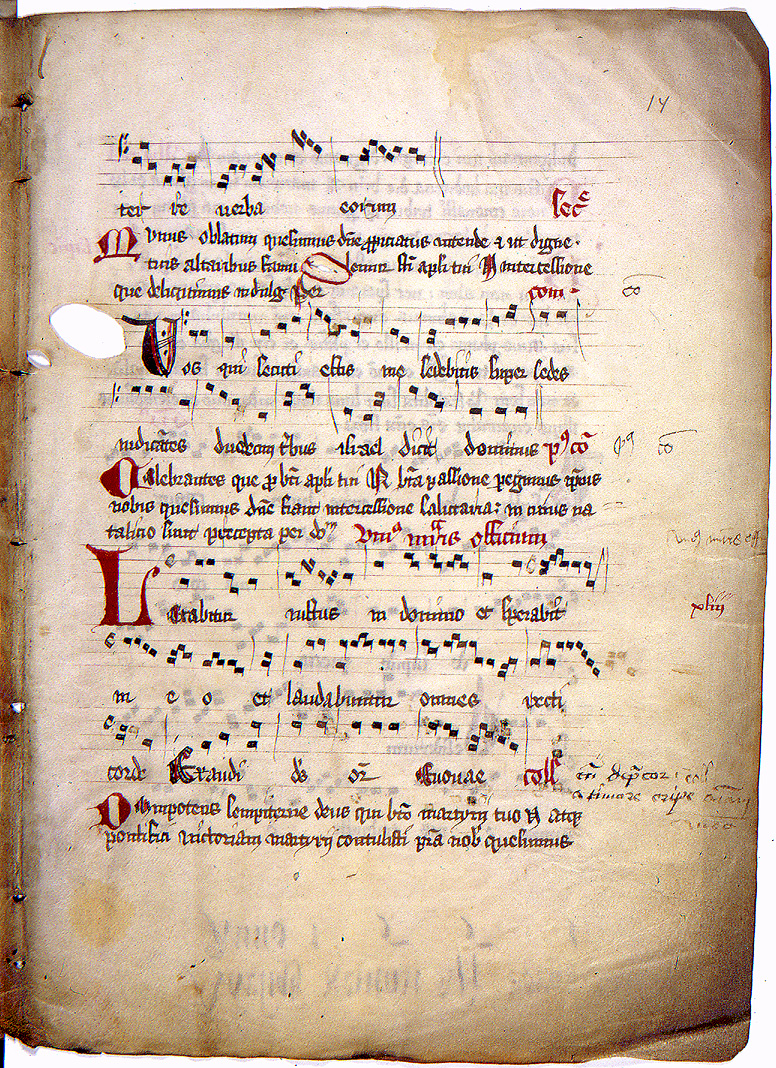
Page from a missal of the 14th or 15th century. The secret is at the top, text reading Munus oblatum, quaesumus Domine, propitiatus intende, et ut digne. ('We beseech thee, O Lord, that thou mayest consider the gift offered, and that thou mayest worthily...')

The secret (Latin: Oratio secreta, lit. 'set-apart prayer') is a prayer said in a low voice by the priest or bishop during religious services.

== Western Christianity ==
In the Roman Rite the secreta is said by the celebrant at the end of the Offertory in the Mass. It is the original and for a long time was the only offertory prayer. It is said in a low voice merely because it was said at the same time the choir sang the Offertory, and it has inherited the special name of Secret as being the only prayer said in that way at the beginning.

The silent recital of the Canon (which is sometimes called "Secreta") did not begin earlier than the sixth or seventh century. The present offertory prayers are late additions, not made in Rome until the fourteenth century. Before that the offertory act was made in silence, and the corresponding prayer that followed it was the Secret. Since it is said silently the Secret is not introduced by the invitation to the people: "Oremus."

The Secret is part of the Accentus of the Mass, changing for each feast or occasion, and is built up in the same way as the Collect. The Secret too alludes to the saint or occasion of the day. But it keeps its special character inasmuch as it nearly always (always in the case of the old ones) asks God to receive the eucharist and sanctify it. All this is found exactly as now in the earliest surviving Secrets, those of the Leonine Sacramentary. Already there the Collect, Secret, Postcommunion, and "Oratio ad populum" form a connected and homogeneous group of prayers. So the multiplication of Collects in one Mass entailed a corresponding multiplication of Secrets. For every Collect the corresponding Secret is said.

The name "Secreta" is used in the Gelasian Sacramentary; in the Gregorian book these prayers have the title "Super oblata." Both names occur frequently in the early Middle Ages. In Ordo Rom. II the prayer is called "Oratio super oblationes secreta". In the Gallican Rite there was also a variable offertory prayer introduced by an invitation to the people; it had no special name. In the Ambrosian Rite the prayer called "Oratio super sindonem" (Sindon for the veil that covers the oblata) is said while the Offertory is being made and another "Oratio super oblata" follows after the Creed, just before the Preface. In the Mozarabic Rite, after an invitation to the people, to which they answer "Præsta æterne omnipotens Deus," the celebrant says a prayer without a special name that corresponds to the Secret and continues at once to the memory of the saints and intercession prayer. In these other Western rites this prayer is said aloud. All the Eastern rites have prayers, now said silently, after the Great Entrance, when the gifts are brought to the altar and offered to God, but they are invariable and none of them can be exactly compared to the Roman Secret.

At either high or low Mass the celebrant, having answered "Amen" to the prayer "Suscipiat Dominus sacrificium", says in a low voice the Secret or Secrets in the same order as he said the Collects, finding each at its place in the proper Mass. He ends the first and last only with the form "Per Dominum nostrum" (as in the Collects). The last clause of the last Secret: "Per omnia sæcula sæculorum" is said or sung aloud, forming the ekphonesis before the Preface.

In the ordinary form of contemporary Catholic usage, the secret corresponds to the Prayer over the Offerings and is sung or recited audibly throughout by the celebrant.

== Eastern Christianity ==
=== Byzantine Rite ===
In the Eastern Orthodox Church and those Eastern Catholic churches which follow the Byzantine Rite, there are numerous secret prayers said by the celebrating priest or bishop, not only at the Divine Liturgy (Eucharist), but at a number of other services also. The time during which the priest says the secret prayers is usually covered either by the deacon chanting a litany or by hymns chanted by the choir. During the Prayer at the Bowing of Heads there may be a period of silence as all bow while the priest quietly reads the prayer. In many cases the ekphonesis which completes the secret prayer is to be said out loud, in the hearing of the people.

At the Divine Liturgy, there are a number of secret prayers said by the priest, both during the litanies and during the anaphora. The primary difference between the Liturgy of Saint John Chrysostom and the Liturgy of Saint Basil the Great is the secret prayers; those of Saint Basil are longer than those of Saint John Chrysostom, and so the choir will often have to extend their chanting to cover the time.

At Vespers and Matins almost all of the secret prayers are said near the beginning, while psalms are being read. At Vespers there are six Lamplighting Prayers which the priest says with uncovered head, standing in front of the Holy Doors (or, in the Greek practice, in front of the icon of Christ on the iconostasis), while the reader says Psalm 103 (Septuagint numbering). At Matins there are twelve Morning Prayers which the priest says with uncovered head while the reader says the Six Psalms (Psalms 3, 37, 62, 87, 102, 142). The priest says the first half of these prayers in front of the Holy Table (altar), and then after the third psalm, comes out to read the rest in front of the Holy Doors (or icon of Christ).

Many of the Sacred Mysteries (sacraments) and other services in the Euchologion (priest's service book) also have secret prayers in them.

Textually, the secret prayers are obviously intended to be said silently, often professing personal unworthiness on the part of the priest, and—though they are often written in the plural—they often contain references to the laity as distinct from the speaker(s), who are the clergy. The rubrics in the service books also will also specify that a prayer is to be said silently. Despite this fact, it has become common in recent years for many priests to recite these prayers out loud.

=== Oriental Rites ===
In the Oriental Orthodox Churches and those Eastern Catholic churches which follow the Oriental Rites, the use of secret prayers occurs with great diversity according to each rite.
