= Tridentine Mass =

Form of liturgy in the Roman Rite

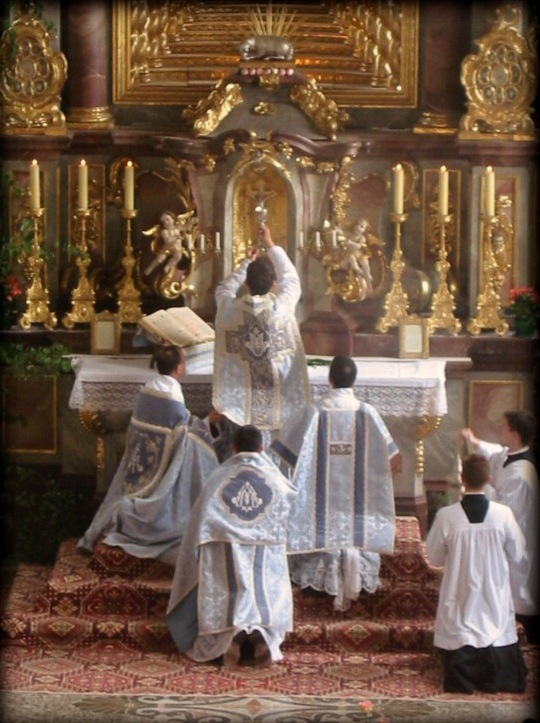
Elevation of the chalice after the consecration during a Solemn Mass celebrated by the Priestly Fraternity of Saint Peter

The Tridentine Mass, also commonly known as the Traditional Latin Mass (TLM), is the form of Mass in the Roman Rite celebrated according to editions of the Roman Missal derived from the missal promulgated by Pope Pius V in 1570 and revised by successive popes through the 1962 edition promulgated by Pope John XXIII. It is normally celebrated in Ecclesiastical Latin.

"Tridentine" is derived from the Latin Tridentinus, lit. 'relating to the city of Trent', where the Council of Trent was held. Following a decision of the council, Pius V promulgated the 1570 Roman Missal and made its use obligatory throughout the Latin Church, except where another rite or liturgical use had been continuously observed for at least 200 years. (Note: These regions included those in which a variant of the Roman Rite, called the Sarum Rite, was in use for more than the minimum required time. On a few recent occasions Roman Catholic prelates have used this variant as an extraordinary form of celebrating Mass. However, like most of the other regions and the orders concerned, the Sarum Rite areas have adopted the standard Roman Missal. The most important non-Roman liturgies that continue in use are the Ambrosian Rite, the Mozarabic Rite and the Carthusian Rite.) Successive editions of the missal served as the principal liturgical books for the celebration of Mass in most of the Latin Church for approximately four centuries. Following the Second Vatican Council, Paul VI promulgated a revised Roman Missal in 1969, whose first typical edition appeared in 1970.

In 2007, Pope Benedict XVI's motu proprio Summorum Pontificum permitted broader use of the 1962 Roman Missal and described it as the Extraordinary Form of the Roman Rite. A 2011 instruction concerning the implementation of Summorum Pontificum also referred to it as the usus antiquior ('older use').

In 2021, Pope Francis's motu proprio Traditionis custodes restricted the use of the 1962 Roman Missal and declared the liturgical books promulgated by Paul VI and John Paul II in conformity with the Second Vatican Council to be the "unique expression of the lex orandi of the Roman Rite". A 2023 rescript concerning its implementation confirmed that certain dispensations relating to celebrations according to the 1962 Missal are reserved to the Apostolic See.

== Terminology ==
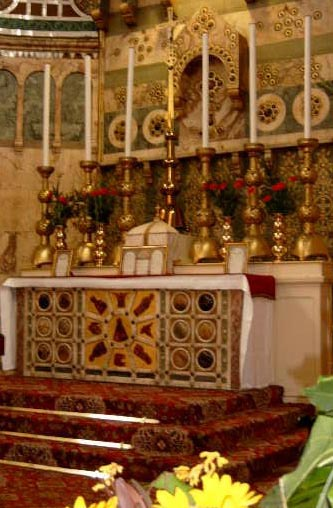
A Roman Rite Catholic altar set up ready for a solemn mass. Leaning against the tabernacle and two of the candlesticks are altar cards (sometimes associated with the Tridentine manner of celebrating the Mass).

The term "Tridentine Mass" applies to celebrations in accordance with the successive editions of the Roman Missal whose title attribute them to the Council of Trent (Missale Romanum ex decreto Sacrosancti Concilii Tridentini restitutum) and to the pope or popes who made the revision represented in the edition in question. The first of these editions is that of 1570, in which the mention of the Council of Trent is followed by a reference to Pope Pius V (Pii V Pont. Max. iussu editum). The last, that of 1962, mentions the popes only generically (Missale Romanum ex decreto SS. Concilii Tridentini restitutum Summorum Pontificum cura recognitum). Editions later than that of 1962 mention the Second Vatican Council instead of the Council of Trent, as in the 2002 edition: Missale Romanum ex decreto Sacrosancti Oecumenici Concilii Vaticani II instauratum auctoritati Pauli Pp. VI promulgatum Ioannis Pauli Pp. II cura recognitum.

Sometimes the term "Tridentine Mass" is applied restrictively to Masses in which the final 1962 edition of the Tridentine Roman Missal is used, the only edition still authorized, under certain conditions, as an extraordinary form of the Roman Rite Mass.

Some speak of this form of Mass as "the Latin Mass". This too is a restrictive use of a term whose proper sense is wider. The Second Vatican Council Mass also has its normative text, from which vernacular translations are made, in Latin, and, except at Masses scheduled by the ecclesiastical authorities to take place in the language of the people, it can everywhere be celebrated in Latin.

A few speak of the Tridentine Mass in general or of its 1962 form as the "Gregorian Rite". The term "Tridentine Rite" is also sometimes met with, but Pope Benedict XVI declared it inappropriate to speak of the 1962 Roman Missal and that published by later popes as if they were two rites: rather, he wrote, it is a matter of "a twofold use of one and the same" Roman Rite. Hugh Somerville-Knapman, O.S.B., says that they should be separate rites, as the Mass promulgated at the Council of Trent was already the pre-existing liturgy of the Diocese of Rome and has direct continuity with the Mass practiced by the apostles, whereas the changes made in implementing the Mass of Paul VI are so great that it no longer resembles any Catholic liturgy practiced prior to the 20th century.

Other names for the edition promulgated by Pope John XXIII in 1962 (the last to bear the indication ex decreto Sacrosancti Concilii Tridentini restitutum) are the Extraordinary Form, or the usus antiquior ("more ancient usage" in Latin).

Traditionalist Catholics, whose best-known characteristic is an attachment to the Tridentine Mass, frequently refer to it as the "Traditional Mass" or the "Traditional Latin Mass". They describe as a "codifying" of the form of the Mass the preparation of Pius V's edition of the Roman Missal, of which he said that the experts to whom he had entrusted the work collated the existing text with ancient manuscripts and writings, restored it to "the original form and rite of the holy Fathers" and further emended it.

== Language ==
In most countries, the language used for celebrating the Tridentine Mass was and is Latin, which became the language of the Roman liturgy in the late 4th century. There have been some exceptions, primarily in missionary areas or for ancient churches with an established sacred-language tradition:

- In Dalmatia and parts of Istria in Croatia, the liturgy was celebrated in Old Church Slavonic from the time of Cyril and Methodius, and authorization for use of this language was extended to some other Slavic regions between 1886 and 1935.
- In the late 1500s, permission was granted for missionaries working in India to use Syriac for the mass.
- On 27 June 1615 Pope Paul V granted permission for Mass and the Divine Office to be celebrated, and the sacraments administered, in the Chinese language according to the Roman Rite, and Lodovico Buglio, S.J., carried out the translation of the Missal, the Ritual, and a large part of the Breviary into Chinese. This faculty was never used.
- Similarly, on 17 April 1624, permission was granted for the Discalced Carmelites to use Arabic at the mission in Persia, and on 30 April 1631 the Theatines were granted permission to use Georgian or Armenian at their mission in Georgia.
- Permission to use Arabic was also extended to the Franciscans in the Holy Land in the nineteenth century.
- Missionaries in Canada were authorized to use Mohawk and Algonquin translations of the ordinary and the proper of the Tridentine Mass at least through the middle 1800s.
- In 1958, permission was given for Hindi to be used at masses in India.

After the publication of the 1962 edition of the Roman Missal, the 1964 Instruction on implementing the Constitution on Sacred Liturgy of the Second Vatican Council laid down that "normally the epistle and gospel from the Mass of the day shall be read in the vernacular". Episcopal conferences were to decide, with the consent of the Holy See, what other parts, if any, of the Mass were to be celebrated in the vernacular.

Outside the Roman Catholic Church:

- The vernacular language was introduced into the celebration of the Tridentine Mass by some European Old Catholics (most Old Catholics use the Tridentine Mass, either in the vernacular or in Latin) and by Anglican Anglo-Catholics (with the introduction of the English Missal).
- Some Western Rite Orthodox Christians, particularly in the Antiochian Orthodox Christian Archdiocese of North America's Western Rite Vicariate, use the Tridentine Mass in the vernacular with minor alterations under the title of the "Divine Liturgy of St. Gregory". Latin Masses on days of the week other than Sunday are becoming common.

== Pope Pius V's revision of the liturgy ==
At the time of the Council of Trent, the traditions preserved in printed and manuscript missals varied considerably, and standardization was sought both within individual dioceses and throughout the Latin West. Standardization was required also in order to prevent the introduction into the liturgy of Protestant ideas in the wake of the Protestant Reformation.

Pope Pius V accordingly imposed uniformity by law in 1570 with the papal bull "Quo primum", ordering use of the Roman Missal as revised by him. He allowed only those rites that were at least 200 years old to survive the promulgation of his 1570 Missal. Several of the rites that remained in existence were progressively abandoned, though the Ambrosian rite survives in Milan, Italy and neighbouring areas, stretching even into Switzerland, and the Mozarabic rite remains in use to a limited extent in Toledo and Madrid, Spain. The Carmelite, Carthusian and Dominican religious orders kept their rites, but in the second half of the 20th century the Carmelites and Dominicans chose to adopt the Roman Rite. The rite of Braga, in northern Portugal, seems to have been practically abandoned: since 18 November 1971 that archdiocese authorizes its use only on an optional basis.

Beginning in the late 17th century, France and neighbouring areas, such as Münster, Cologne and Trier in Germany, saw a flurry of independent missals published by bishops influenced by Jansenism and Gallicanism. This ended when Abbot Guéranger and others initiated in the 19th century a campaign to return to the Roman Missal.

Pius V's revision of the liturgy had as one of its declared aims the restoration of the Roman Missal "to the original form and rite of the holy Fathers". Due to the relatively limited resources available to his scholars, this aim was in fact not realised.

Three different printings of Pius V's Roman Missal, with minor variations, appeared in 1570, a folio and a quarto edition in Rome and a folio edition in Venice. A reproduction of what is considered to be the earliest, referred to therefore as the editio princeps, was produced in 1998. In the course of the printing of the editio princeps, some corrections were made by pasting revised texts over parts of the already printed pages. There were several printings again in the following year 1571, with various corrections of the text.

== Historical variations ==
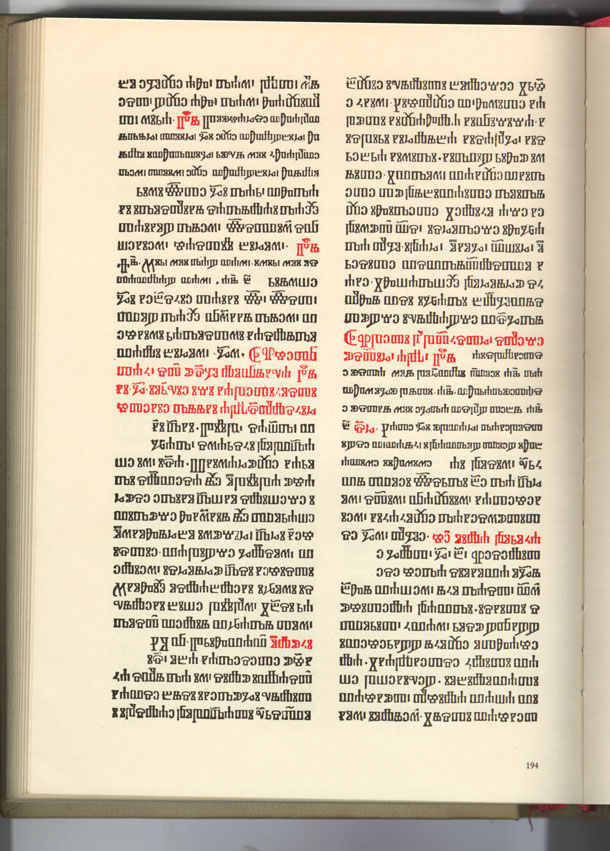
Missale Romanum in Croatian Glagolitic script printed in 1483

In the apostolic constitution (papal bull) Quo primum, with which he prescribed use of his 1570 edition of the Roman Missal, Pius V decreed: "We order and enjoin that nothing must be added to Our recently published Missal, nothing omitted from it, nor anything whatsoever be changed within it." This of course did not exclude changes by a Pope, and Pope Pius V himself added to the Missal the feast of Our Lady of Victory, to celebrate the victory of Lepanto of 7 October 1571. His immediate successor, Pope Gregory XIII, changed the name of this feast to "The Most Holy Rosary of the Blessed Virgin Mary" and Pope John XXIII changed it to "Our Lady of the Rosary".

Pius V's work in severely reducing the number of feasts in the Roman calendar (see this comparison) was very soon further undone by his successors. Feasts that he had abolished, such as those of the Presentation of Mary, Saint Anne and Saint Anthony of Padua, were restored even before Clement VIII's 1604 typical edition of the Missal was issued.

In the course of the following centuries new feasts were repeatedly added and the ranks of certain feasts were raised or lowered. A comparison between Pope Pius V's Tridentine calendar and the General Roman Calendar of 1954 shows the changes made from 1570 to 1954. Pope Pius XII made a general revision in 1955, and Pope John XXIII made further general revisions in 1960 simplifying the terminology concerning the ranking of liturgical celebrations.

While keeping on 8 December what he called the feast of "the Conception of Blessed Mary" (omitting the word "Immaculate"), Pius V suppressed the existing special Mass for the feast, directing that the Mass for the Nativity of Mary (with the word "Nativity" replaced by "Conception") be used instead. Part of that earlier Mass was revived in the Mass that Pope Pius IX ordered to be used on the feast.

=== Typical editions of the Roman Missal ===
In addition to such occasional changes, the Roman Missal was subjected to general revisions whenever a new "typical edition" (an official edition whose text was to be reproduced in printings by all publishers) was issued.

After Pius V's original Tridentine Roman Missal, the first new typical edition was promulgated in 1604 by Pope Clement VIII, who in 1592 had issued a revised edition of the Vulgate. The Bible texts in the Missal of Pope Pius V did not correspond exactly to the new Vulgate, and so Clement edited and revised Pope Pius V's Missal, making alterations both in the scriptural texts and in other matters. He abolished some prayers that the 1570 Missal obliged the priest to say on entering the church; shortened the two prayers to be said after the Confiteor; directed that the words "Haec quotiescumque feceritis, in meam memoriam facietis" ("Do this in memory of me") should not be said while displaying the chalice to the people after the consecration, but before doing so; inserted directions at several points of the Canon that the priest was to pronounce the words inaudibly; suppressed the rule that, at High Mass, the priest, even if not a bishop, was to give the final blessing with three signs of the cross; and rewrote the rubrics, introducing, for instance, the ringing of a small bell. (Note: Similarly, Clement VIII did not juridically abrogate the Missal of Pius V, nor did the other Popes who issued later typical editions of the Roman Missal before that of Paul VI (Urban VIII, Leo XIII, Benedict XV, John XXIII) juridically abrogate the previous editions. Even Pius V juridically abolished only those variants of the Roman Rite that had less than 200 years' antiquity.)

The next typical edition was issued in 1634, when Pope Urban VIII made another general revision of the Roman Missal.

There was no further typical edition until that of Pope Leo XIII in 1884. It introduced only minor changes, not profound enough to merit having the papal bull of its promulgation included in the Missal, as the bulls of 1604 and 1634 were.

In 1911, with the bull Divino Afflatu, Pope Pius X made significant changes in the rubrics.

Pope Pius XII radically revised the Palm Sunday and Easter Triduum liturgy, suppressed many vigils and octaves and made other alterations in the calendar (see General Roman Calendar of Pope Pius XII). John XXIII's 1960 Code of Rubrics were incorporated in the final 1962 typical edition of the Tridentine Missal, replacing both Pius X's "Additions and Changes in the Rubrics of the Missal" and the earlier "General Rubrics of the Missal".

The General Roman Calendar was revised partially in 1955 and 1960 and completely in 1969 in Pope Paul VI's motu proprio Mysterii Paschalis, again reducing the number of feasts.

=== 1962 Missal ===
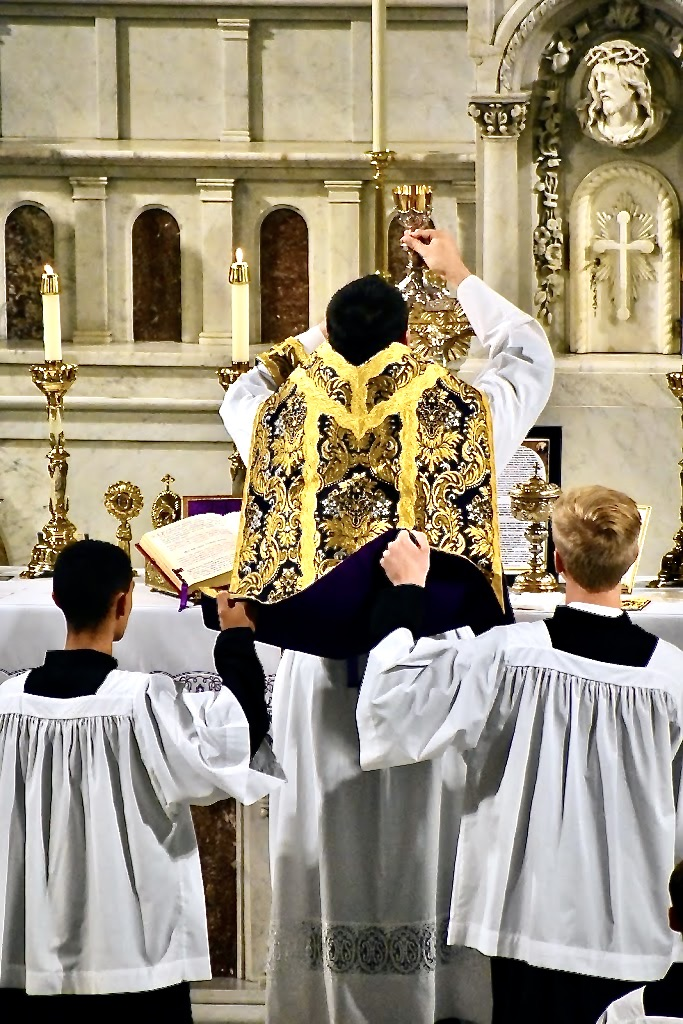
Elevation of the Chalice during consecration at a missa cantata

The Roman Missal issued by Pope John XXIII in 1962 differed from earlier editions in a number of ways.

- It incorporated the change made by John XXIII in 1962, when he inserted into the canon of the Mass the name of Saint Joseph, the first change in centuries to the Canon of the Mass.
- In addition, the 1962 Missal removed the adjective perfidis from the Good Friday prayer for the Jews.

In 2007, Pope Benedict XVI authorized, under certain conditions, continued use of the 1962 edition of the Roman Missal as an "extraordinary form", alongside the later form, introduced in 1970, which he termed the "normal form" or "ordinary form".

- This included a new replacement Good Friday prayer for the Jews for the 1962 liturgy.

Pre-1962 forms of the Roman Rite, which some individuals and groups employ, (Note: Their dislike of the 1962 Missal is expressed for instance in list of differences prepared by Daniel Dolan) are generally not authorized for liturgical use, but in early 2018 the Pontifical Commission Ecclesia Dei granted communities served by the Priestly Fraternity of Saint Peter an indult to use, at the discretion of the Fraternity's superior, the pre-1955 Holy Week liturgy for three years (2018, 2019, 2020).

== Liturgical structure ==
The Mass is divided into two parts, the Mass of the Catechumens and the Mass of the Faithful. Catechumens, those being instructed in the faith, were once dismissed after the first half, not having yet professed the faith. Profession of faith was considered essential for participation in the Eucharistic sacrifice.

This rule of the Didache is still in effect. It is only one of the three conditions (baptism, right faith and right living) for admission to receiving Holy Communion that the Catholic Church has always applied and that were already mentioned in the early 2nd century by Saint Justin Martyr: "And this food is called among us the Eucharist, of which no one is allowed to partake but the man who believes that the things which we teach are true, and who has been washed with the washing that is for the remission of sins, and unto regeneration, and who is so living as Christ has enjoined" (First Apology, Chapter LXVI).

=== Before Mass ===
Asperges (Sprinkling with holy water, Psalm 51:9, 3) is an optional penitential rite that ordinarily precedes only the principal Mass on Sunday. (Note: It is an additional ceremony, not part of the Mass itself, and in the Tridentine Missal is given only in an appendix.) In the sacristy, a priest wearing an alb, if he is to celebrate the Mass, or surplice, if he is not the celebrant of the Mass, and vested with a stole, which is the color of the day if the priest is the celebrant of the Mass or purple if he is not the celebrant of the Mass, exorcises and blesses salt and water, then puts the blessed salt into the water by thrice sprinkling it in the form of a cross while saying once, "Commixtio salis et aquæ pariter fiat in nomine Patris, et Filii et Spiritus Sancti" (May a mixture of salt and water now be made in the name of the Father, and of the Son, and of the Holy Spirit). After that, the priest, vested in a cope of the color of the day, while the choir sings an antiphon and a verse of Psalm 50/51 or 117/118, sprinkles with the holy water the altar three times, and then the clergy and the congregation. This rite, if used, precedes the Prayers at the Foot of the Altar. During the Easter season, the "Asperges me..." verse is replaced by the "Vidi aquam..." verse, and "Alleluia" is added to the "Ostende nobis..." verse and to its response.

Following the Asperges, Mass begins.

=== Mass of the Catechumens ===
The first part is the Mass of the Catechumens.

==== Prayers at the foot of the altar ====
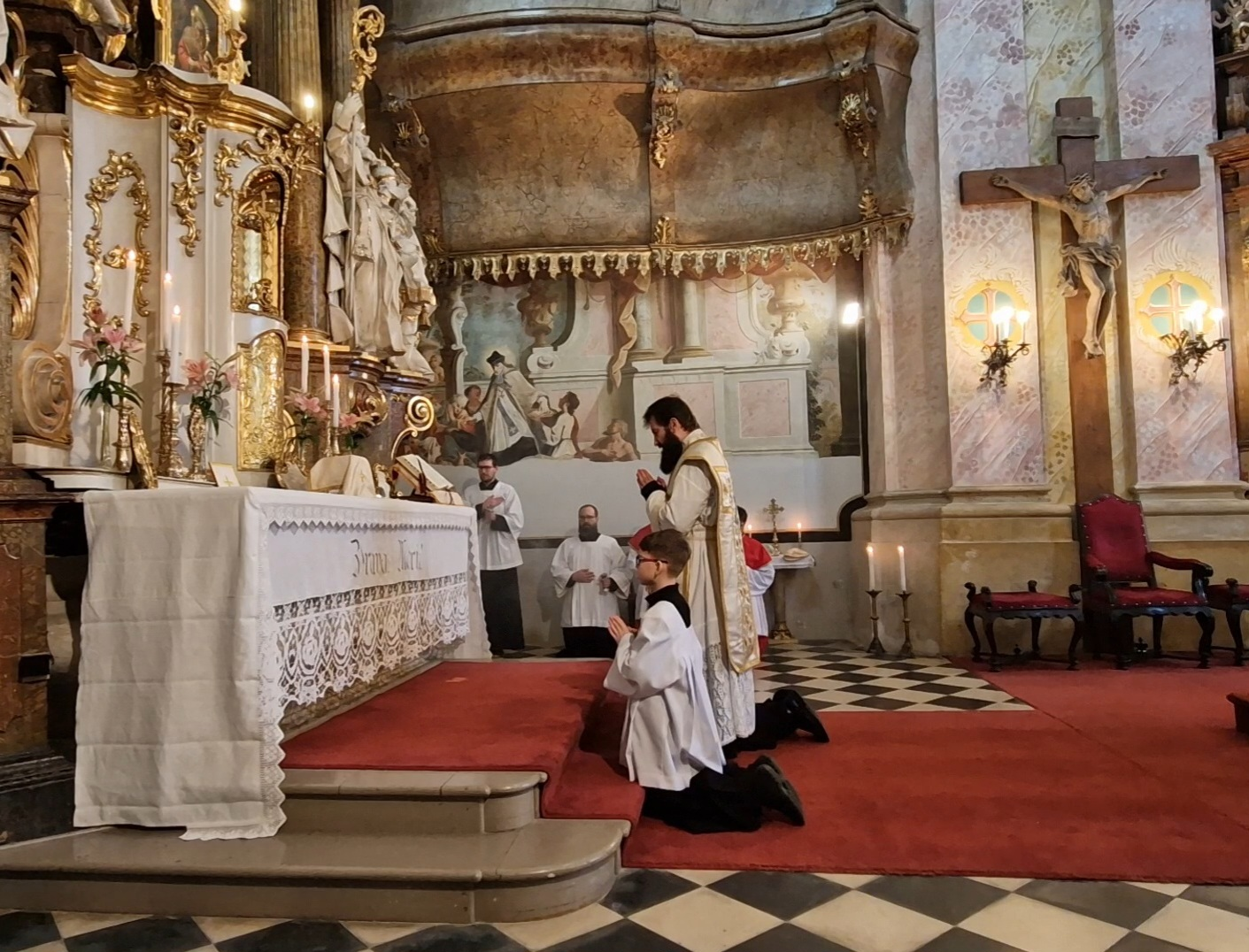
Prayers at the foot of the altar at a Missa Cantata

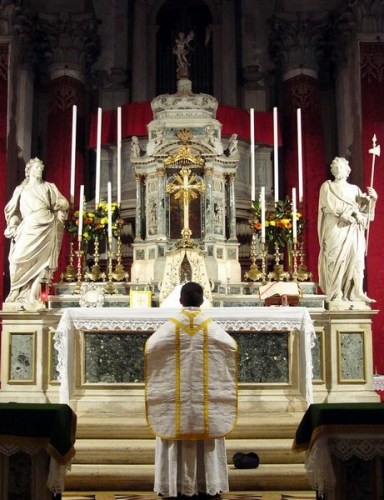
Prayers at the foot of the altar at a Low Mass

The sequence of Prayers at the foot of the altar is:

- Sign of the cross

The priest, after processing in—at solemn Mass with deacon, and subdeacon, master of ceremonies and servers, and at other Masses with one or more servers—and at Low Mass placing the veiled chalice on the centre of the altar, makes the sign of the cross at the foot of the altar. At Solemn Mass, the chalice is placed beforehand on the credence table.

- Psalm 42 (Psalm 43 MT, i.e. Masoretic numbering), known by its incipit Iudica me, is recited, except in Masses of the season during Passiontide and in Requiem Masses. It is preceded and followed by an antiphon of the same psalm: "Introibo ad altare Dei, ad Deum qui lætificat iuventutem meam" (Translation: "I shall go in to the altar of God: to God who giveth joy to my youth"), is recited by the priest, alternating with the deacon and subdeacon (if present) or servers.
- Psalm 123:8 is recited:

Priest (makes the sign of the cross): "Our help is in the name of the Lord,"
Servers: "Who made heaven and earth."

- The double form of a prayer of general confession of sins, known by its incipit Confiteor (I confess), is recited:

Priest (while bowing low): "Confíteor Deo omnipoténti, beátæ Maríæ semper Vírgini, beáto Michaéli Archángelo, beáto Ioanni Baptístæ, sanctis Apóstolis Petro et Paulo, ómnibus Sanctis, et vobis, fratres (tibi, Pater), quia peccávi nimis cogitatióne, verbo et ópere: (while striking the breast three times) mea culpa, mea culpa, mea máxima culpa. Ídeo precor beátam Maríam semper Vírginem, beátum Michaélem Archángelum, beátum Ioánnem Baptístam, sanctos Apóstolos Petrum et Paulum, omnes Sanctos, et vos, fratres (te, Pater), oráre pro me ad Dóminum Deum nostrum."

(Translation: I confess to almighty God, to blessed Mary ever Virgin, to blessed Michael the archangel, to blessed John the Baptist, to the holy apostles Peter and Paul, to all the saints, and to you, brethren, that I have sinned exceedingly in thought, word, and deed through my fault, through my fault, through my most grievous fault. Therefore, I beseech blessed Mary ever Virgin, blessed Michael the archangel, blessed John the Baptist, the holy apostles Peter and Paul, all the saints and you, brethren, to pray for me to the Lord our God.)

The servers pray for the priest: "May Almighty God have mercy on thee, forgive thee thy sins, and bring thee to life everlasting." Then it is the ministers' or servers' turn to confess sinfulness and to ask for prayers. They use the same words as those used by the priest, except that they say "you, Father", in place of "you, brethren", and the priest responds with the same prayer that the servers have used for him (but using the plural number) plus an extra prayer.

- The following verses are then said by priest and ministers (or servers):

℣. Deus, tu conversus vivificábis nos.
℟. Et plebs tua lætábitur in te.
℣. Óstende nobis, Dómine, misericórdiam tuam.
℟. Et salutáre tuum da nobis.
℣. Dómine, exáudi orátionem meam.
℟. Et clamor meus ad te véniat.
℣. Dóminus vobíscum.
℟. Et cum spíritu tuo.

Thou wilt turn, O God, and bring us to life: (Ps. 84:7–8)
And thy people shall rejoice in thee.
Shew us, O Lord, thy mercy.
And grant us thy salvation.
O Lord, hear my prayer.
And let my cry come unto thee.
The Lord be with you.
And with thy spirit.

The priest then says, Oremus (Let us pray). After this he ascends to the altar, praying silently "Aufer a nobis, quæsumus, Dómine, iniquitates nostras: ut ad Sancta sanctorum puris mereámur méntibus introíre. Per Christum Dóminum nostrum. Amen." (Translation: Take away from us our iniquities, we beseech thee O Lord, that with pure minds we may worthily enter into the holy of holies"), a reference to Exodus 26:33–34, 1 Kings 6:16, 1 Kings 8:6, 2 Chronicles 3:8, Ezekiel 41:4, and others. He places his joined hands on the edge of the altar, so that only the tips of the small fingers touch the front of it, and silently prays that, by the merits of the Saints whose relics are in the altar, and of all the Saints, God may pardon all his sins. At the words quorum relíquiæ hic sunt (whose relics are here), he spreads his hands and kisses the altar.

==== Priest at the altar ====
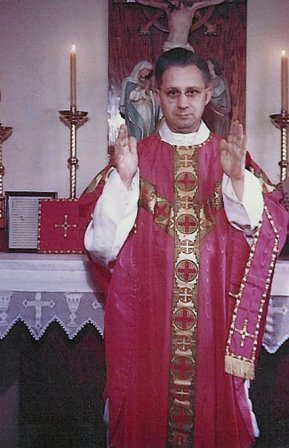
Dominus vobiscum ("The Lord be with you") before the Collect. In the Tridentine Mass the priest should keep his eyes downcast at this point.

- Introit
  - The priest again makes the sign of the Cross while he begins to read the Introit, which is usually taken from a Psalm. Exceptions occur: e.g. the Introit for Easter Sunday is adapted from Wis 10:20–21, and the antiphon in Masses of the Blessed Virgin Mary was from the poet Sedulius. This evolved from the practice of singing a full Psalm, interspersed with the antiphon, during the entrance of the clergy, before the Prayers at the Foot of the Altar were added to the Mass in medieval times. This is indicated by the very name of "Introit".
- Kyrie
  - This part of Mass is a linguistic marker of the origins of the Roman liturgy in Greek. "Kyrie, eleison; Christe, eleison; Kyrie, eleison." means "Lord, have mercy; Christ have mercy;..." Each phrase is said (or sung) three times.
- Gloria in excelsis Deo
  - The first line of the Gloria is taken from Lk 2:14. The Gloria is omitted during the penitential liturgical seasons of Advent, Septuagesima, Lent, and Passiontide, in which violet vestments are worn, but is used on feasts falling during such seasons, as well as on Holy (Maundy) Thursday. It is always omitted for a Requiem Mass.
- The Collect
  - The priest turns toward the people and says, "Dominus vobiscum." The servers respond: "Et cum spiritu tuo." ("The Lord be with you." "And with thy spirit"). The Collect follows, a prayer not drawn directly from Scripture. It tends to reflect the season.

==== Instruction ====
- The priest reads the Epistle, primarily an extract from the letters of St. Paul to various churches. In his motu proprio Summorum Pontificum, Pope Benedict XVI permitted this to be read in the vernacular language when Mass is celebrated with the people.
- Between the Epistle and the Gospel, two (rarely three) choir responses are sung or said. Usually these are a Gradual followed by an Alleluia; but between Septuagesima Sunday and Holy Saturday, or in a Requiem Mass or other penitential Mass the Alleluia is replaced by a Tract, and between Easter Sunday and Pentecost the Gradual is replaced by a second Alleluia. On a few exceptional occasions (most notably Easter, Pentecost, Corpus Christi, and in a Requiem Mass), a Sequence follows the Alleluia or Tract.
  - The Gradual is partly composed of a portion of a Psalm.
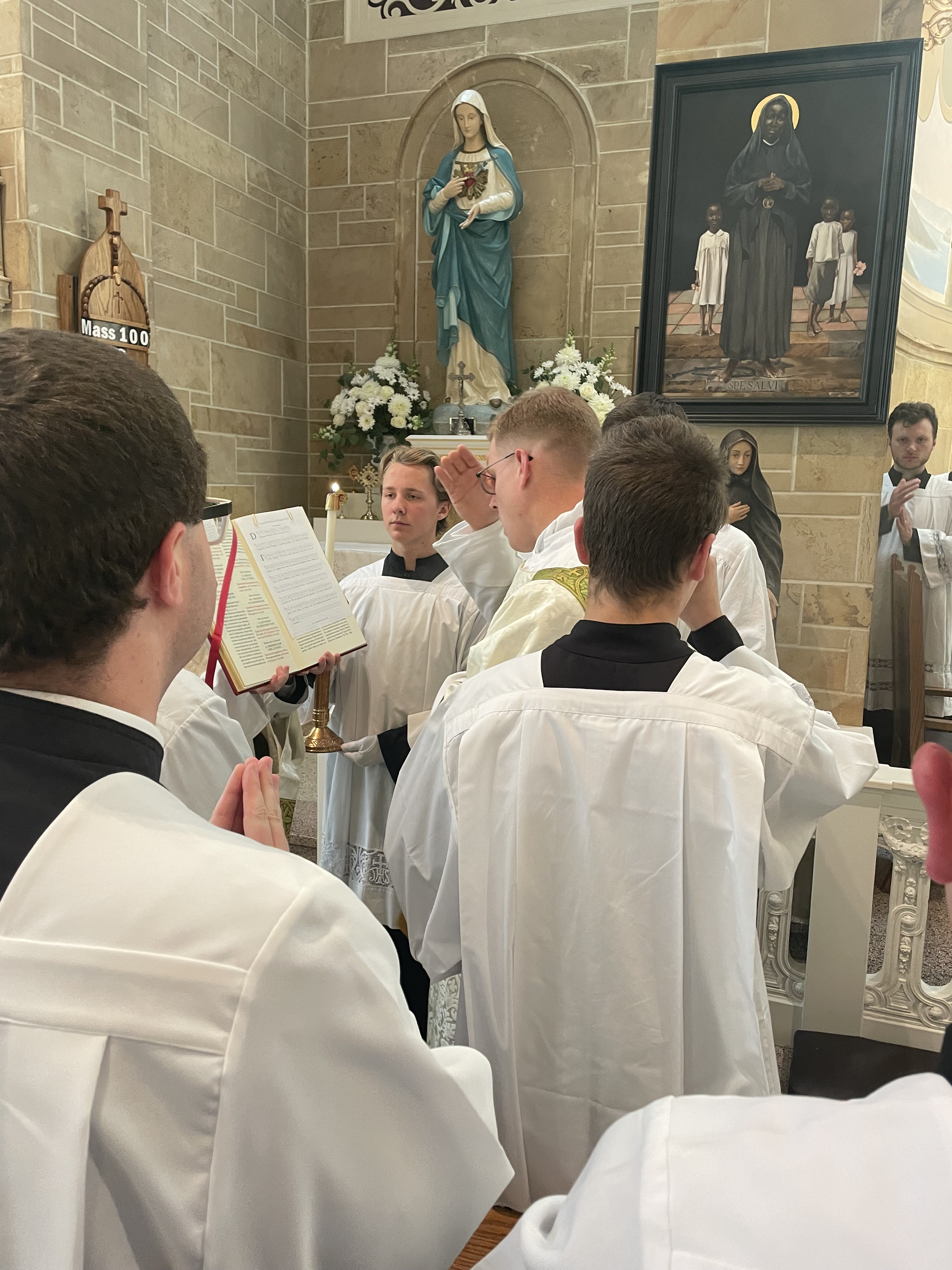
- The Deacon preparing to chant the Gospel
  The Gospel reading, an extract from one of the four Gospels
  - Before the reading or chanting of the Gospel, the priest prays: "Cleanse my heart and my lips, O almighty God, who didst cleanse the lips of the prophet Isaias...", a reference to Isaiah 6:6. In this passage, after being cleansed by the angel, Isaiah was instructed to prophesy.
- The Homily
  - The rite of Mass as revised by Pope Pius V (the Tridentine Mass) does not consider a sermon obligatory and speaks of it instead as merely optional: it presumes that the Creed, if it is to be said, will follow the Gospel immediately, but adds: "If, however, someone is to preach, the Homilist, after the Gospel has been finished, preaches, and when the sermon or moral address has been completed, the Credo is said, or if it is not to be said, the Offertory is sung." By contrast the Roman Missal as revised by Pope Paul VI declares that the homily may not be omitted without a grave reason from Mass celebrated with the people attending on Sundays and Holy Days of Obligation and that it is recommended on other days.
- The Creed
  - The Niceno-Constantinopolitan Creed, professing faith in God the Father, in God the Son, in God the Holy Spirit, and in the one, holy, catholic and apostolic Church. At the mention of the Incarnation, the celebrant and the congregation genuflect.

=== Mass of the Faithful ===
The second part is the Mass of the Faithful.

==== Offertory ====
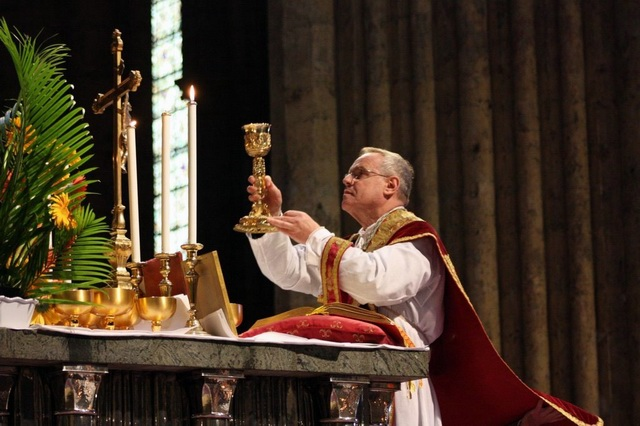
Elevation of the chalice during the Canon of the Mass at a Missa Cantata

- Offertory Verse
  - After greeting the people once more ("Dominus vobiscum/Et cum spiritu tuo") and giving the invitation to pray (Oremus), the priest enters upon the Mass of the Faithful, from which the non-baptized were once excluded. He reads the Offertory Verse, a short quotation from Holy Scripture which varies with the Mass of each day, with hands joined.
- Offertory Prayers
  - The priest offers the host, holding it on the paten at breast level and praying that, although he is unworthy, God may accept "this spotless host (or victim, the basic meaning of hostia in Latin) for his own innumerable sins, offences and neglects, for all those present, and for all faithful Christians living and dead, that it may avail unto salvation of himself and those mentioned. He then mixes a few drops of water with the wine, which will later become the Blood of Jesus, and holding the chalice so that the lip of the chalice is about the height of his lips, offers "the chalice of salvation", asking that it may "ascend with a sweet fragrance." He then prays a prayer of contrition adapted from Dan 3:39–40.
- Incensing of the offerings and of the faithful
  - At a High Mass, the priest blesses the incense, then incenses the bread and wine. Among the prayers the priest says is Psalm 141:2–4: "Let my prayer, O Lord, be directed as incense in Thy sight;...", which is prayed as he incenses the altar. The priest then gives the thurible to the deacon, who incenses the priest, then the other ministers and the congregation.
- Washing the hands
  - The priest prays Psalm 26:6–12: "I will wash my hands among the innocent..."
- Prayer to the Most Holy Trinity
  - This prayer asks that the Divine Trinity may receive the oblation being made in remembrance of the passion, resurrection and ascension of Jesus and in honour of blessed Mary ever Virgin and the other saints, "that it may avail to their honour and our salvation: and that they may vouchsafe to intercede for us in heaven..."
- Orate fratres, Suscipiat and Secret; Amen concludes Offertory
  - Here the priest turns to the congregation and says the first two words, "Orate, fratres", in an elevated tone and then turns around while finishing the exhortation in the secret tone. "Pray, Brethren, that my sacrifice and yours may be acceptable to God the Father almighty."
  - The altar servers respond with the Suscipiat to which the priest secretly responds, "Amen.": Suscipiat Dominus sacrificium de manibus tuis, ad laudem et gloriam nominis sui, ad utilitatem quoque nostram, totiusque ecclesiæ suae sanctæ. A translation in the English is: "May the Lord accept this sacrifice at your hands, to the praise and glory of His name, for our good and the good of all His Holy Church."
  - The Priest then says the day's Secret inaudibly, and concludes it with Per omnia sæcula sæculorum aloud.
  - The altar servers and (in dialogue Mass) the congregation respond: "Amen."

==== Consecration ====
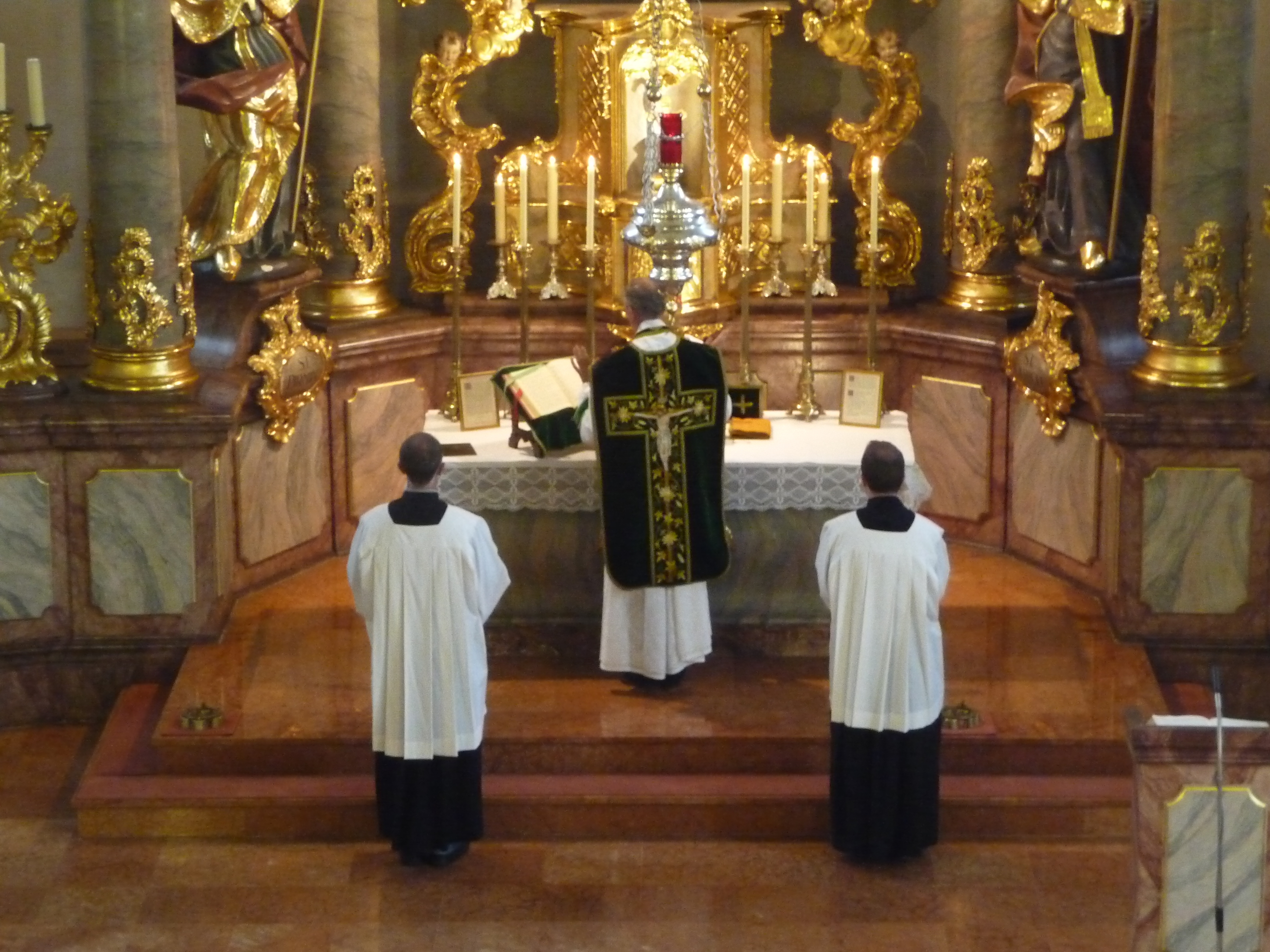
Part of the Canon of the Mass at a Low Mass

- Preface of the Canon
  - "The Roman Canon dates in essentials from before St. Gregory the Great, who died in 604, and who is credited with adding a phrase to it. (See History of the Roman Canon.) It contains the main elements found in almost all rites, but in an unusual arrangement and it is unclear which part should be considered to be the Epiclesis.
  - Dominus vobiscum. Et cum spiritu tuo. Sursum corda. Habemus ad Dominum. Gratias agimus Domino Deo nostro. Dignum et iustum est. The first part can be seen above at the Collect; the rest means: "Lift up your hearts. We lift them up to the Lord. Let us give thanks to the Lord our God. It is right and just".
  - Next a preface is prayed, indicating specific reasons for giving thanks to God. This leads to the Sanctus.
- Canon or rule of consecration
  - Intercession (corresponding to the reading of the diptychs in the Byzantine Rite—a diptych is a two-leaf painting, carving or writing tablet.)
    - Here the priest prays for the living, that God may guard, unite and govern the Church together with the Pope and "all those who, holding to the truth, hand on the catholic and apostolic faith". Then specific living people are mentioned, and the congregation in the church. Next, Mary ever Virgin, Saint Joseph, the Apostles, and some Popes and other Martyrs are mentioned by name, as well as a generic "and all your Saints", in communion with whom prayer is offered.
  - Prayers preparatory to the consecration
    - A prayer that God may graciously accept the offering and "command that we be delivered from eternal damnation and counted among the flock of those you have chosen".
  - Consecration (transubstantiation) and major elevation
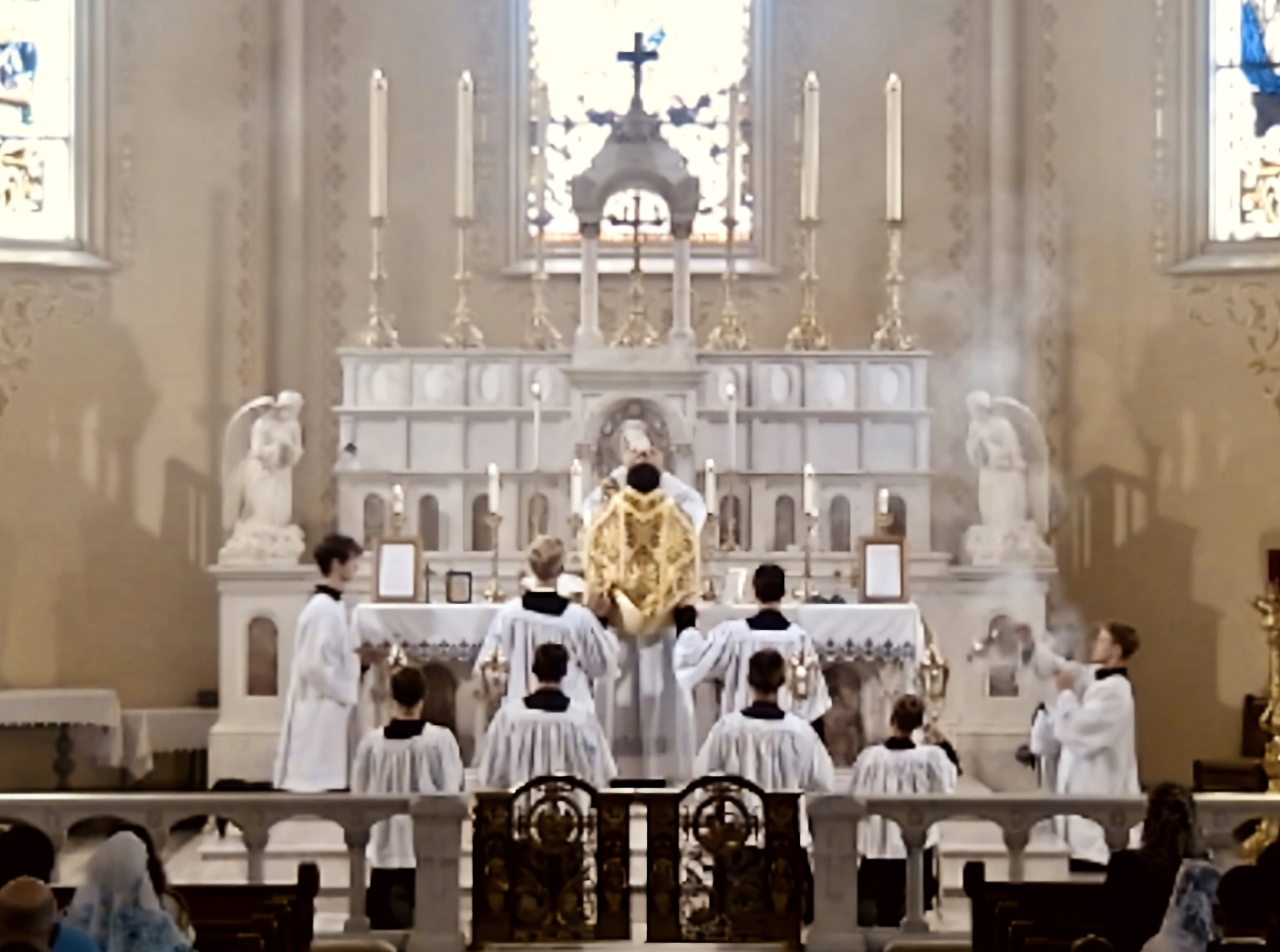
    Elevation of the Host during the Canon of the Mass at a Missa Cantata
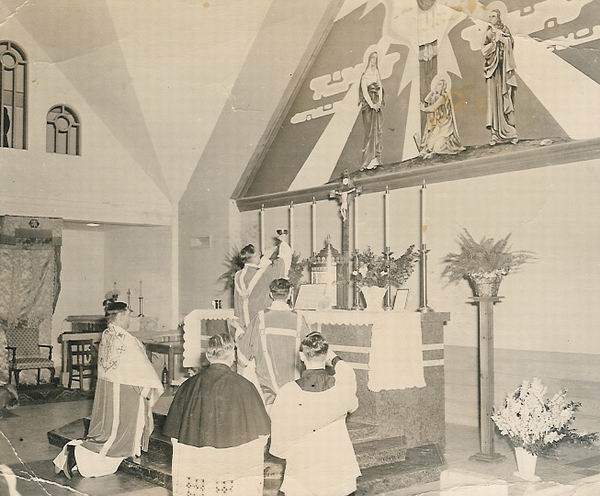
    Elevation of the chalice during the Canon of the Mass at a Solemn Mass
    - The passage Lk 22:19–20 is key in this section. In Summa Theologiae III 78 3 Thomas Aquinas addresses the interspersed phrase, "the mystery of faith". On this phrase, see Mysterium fidei.
  - Oblation of the victim to God
    - An oblation is an offering; the pure, holy, spotless victim is now offered, with a prayer that God may accept the offering and command his holy angel to carry the offering to God's altar on high, so that those who receive the Body and Blood of Christ "may be filled with every grace and heavenly blessing".
  - Remembrance of the Dead
    - The priest now prays for the dead ("those who have gone before us with the sign of faith and rest in the sleep of peace") and asks that they be granted a place of refreshment, light and peace. This is followed by a prayer that we be granted fellowship with the Saints. John the Baptist and fourteen martyrs, seven men and seven women, are mentioned by name.
  - End of the Canon and doxology with minor elevation
    - The concluding doxology is: Per ipsum, et cum ipso, et in ipso, est tibi Deo Patri omnipotenti, in unitate Spiritus Sancti, ("Through him, and with him, and in him, O God, there is to you, almighty Father, in the unity of the Holy Spirit", − spoken silently while making five signs of the cross with the host) omnis honor, et gloria. ("all glory and honour." − still silently while briefly raising host and chalice a little together). This is followed by replacing the host on the corporal and the pall on the chalice and genuflecting. After this the priest sings or says aloud: Per omnia sæcula sæculorum ("For ever and ever.") The response "Amen" symbolically ratifies the Canon prayer.

==== Elevation candle ====
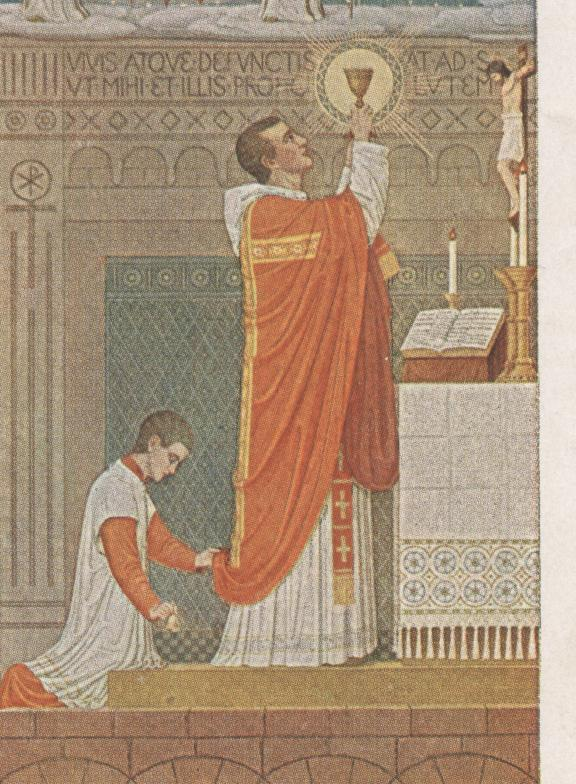
Beuron Art School representation of an elevation candle, mistakenly placed at the Gospel side and upon the altar

Until 1960, the Tridentine form of the Roman Missal laid down that a candle should be placed at the Epistle side of the altar and that it should be lit at the showing of the consecrated sacrament to the people. In practice, except in monasteries and on special occasions, this had fallen out of use long before Pope John XXIII replaced the section on the general rubrics of the Roman Missal with his Code of Rubrics, which no longer mentioned this custom. On this, see Elevation candle.

==== Communion ====
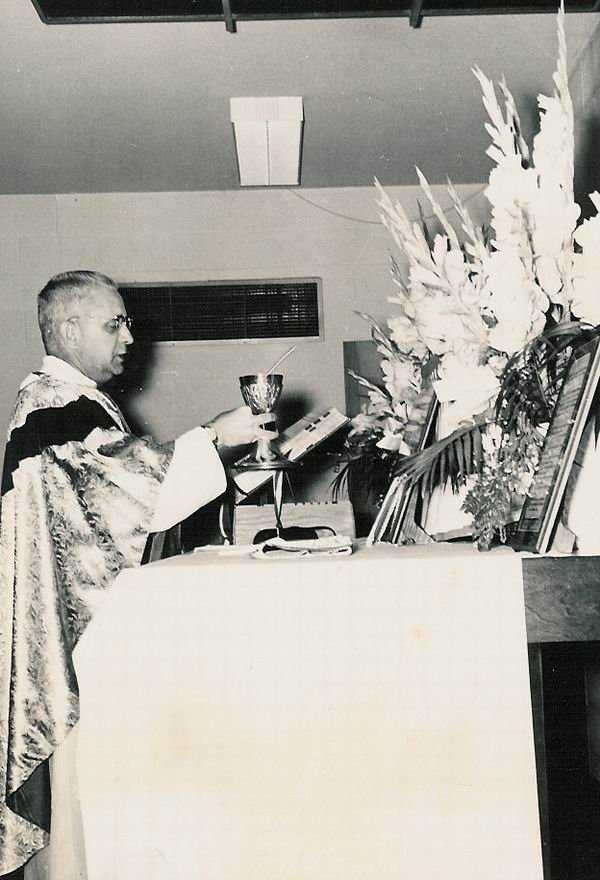
Before receiving Communion from the chalice, the priest makes the sign of the cross over himself, saying (in Latin): May the Blood of our Lord Jesus Christ preserve my soul unto everlasting life. Amen.

- The Lord's Prayer and Libera nos

- The "Libera nos" is an extension of the Lord's Prayer developing the line "sed libera nos a malo" ("but deliver us from evil"). The priest prays that we may be delivered from all evils and that the Virgin Mary, Mother of God, together with the apostles and saints, may intercede to obtain for us peace in our day.

- Fraction of the Host

- During the preceding prayer, the priest breaks the consecrated Host into three parts, and after concluding the prayer drops the smallest part into the Chalice while praying that this commingling and consecration of the Body and Blood of Christ may "be to us who receive it effectual to life everlasting."

- Agnus Dei

- "Agnus Dei" means "Lamb of God". The priest then prays: "Lamb of God, who takest away the sins of the world, have mercy on us." He repeats this, and then adds: "Lamb of God, who takest away the sins of the world, grant us peace." The Mass of the Last Supper on Holy Thursday has "have mercy on us" all three times. In Requiem Masses, the petitions are "grant them rest" (twice), followed by "grant them eternal rest."

- The Pax
  - The priest asks Christ to look not at the priest's sins but at the faith of Christ's Church, and prays for peace and unity within the Church. Then, if a High Mass is being celebrated, he gives the sign of peace to the deacon, saying: "Peace be with you."
- Prayers preparatory to the Communion
  - In the first of these two prayers for himself, the priests asks that by Holy Communion he may be freed from all his iniquities and evils, be made to adhere to the commandments of Jesus and never be separated from him. In the second he asks: "Let not the partaking of Thy Body, O Lord Jesus Christ...turn to my judgment and condemnation: but through Thy goodness may it be unto me a safeguard...."
- Receiving of the Body and Blood of our Lord
  - The priest quietly says several prayers here, before receiving Communion. The first is said in a low voice while taking up the Host onto the paten. The second of them, spoken three times in a slightly audible voice, while the priest holds the Host in his left hand and strikes his breast with his right, is based on Matthew 8:8: "Lord, I am not worthy...." Then, after having reverently consumed the Host, he takes up the chalice while in a low voice reciting Psalm 116:12–13: "What shall I render to the Lord, for all the things he hath rendered unto me? I will take the chalice of salvation; and I will call upon the name of the Lord." immediately adding Psalm 18:3: "Praising I will call upon the Lord: and I shall be saved from my enemies."

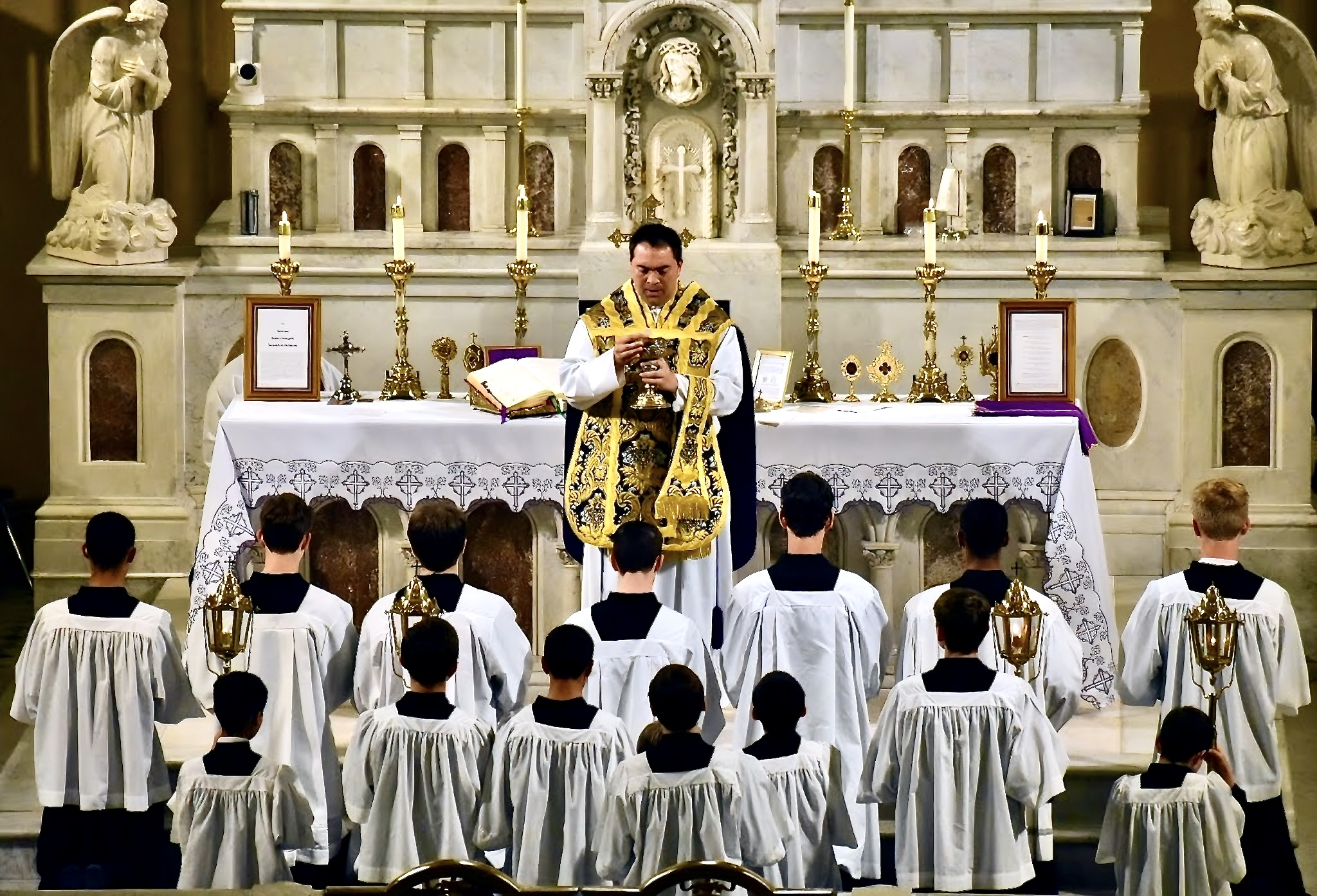
Priest speaking the Ecce Agnus Dei (Behold the Lamb of God) in the Communion of the Faithful at a Missa Cantata

  - If the priest is to give Communion to others, he holds up a small host and says aloud: "Behold the Lamb of God ...", and three times: "Lord, I am not worthy ...". He then gives Communion, first making with the host the sign of the cross over each communicant, while saying: "May the Body of Our Lord Jesus Christ preserve your soul for eternal life. Amen."

==== Conclusion ====
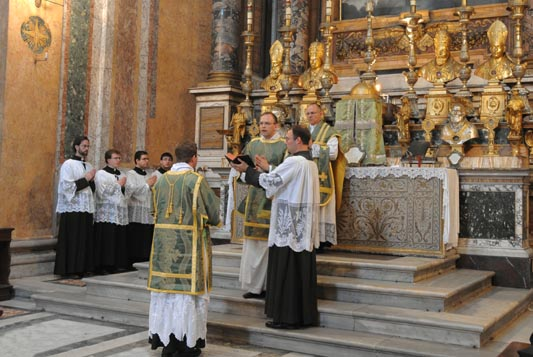
"Ite, missa est" sung by the deacon at a Solemn Mass

- Prayers during the Ablutions
  - The prayers now focus on what has been received, that "we may receive with a pure mind", "that no stain of sin may remain in me, whom these pure and holy sacraments have refreshed."
- Communion Antiphon and Postcommunion
  - The communion antiphon is normally a portion of a Psalm. The Postcommunion Prayer is akin to the Collect in being an appropriate prayer not directly drawn from Scripture.
- Ite Missa est; Blessing
  - "Go, it is the dismissal." The word "Mass" derives from this phrase.
  - After saying a silent prayer for himself, the priest then gives the people his blessing.
  - Prior to the revisions of Pope Pius XII and Pope John XXIII, the Ite Missa est was replaced with Benedicamus Domino ("Let us bless the Lord") on days in which the Gloria was not said and the rubrics required the priest to wear violet vestments (i.e., Masses of the season during Advent, Septuagesima, Lent and Passiontide; vigils; certain votive Masses). In the 1962 Missal, Benedicamus Domino is said only when the Mass is followed by another liturgical action, such as the Eucharistic Processions on Holy Thursday and Corpus Christi.
  - In Requiem Masses, the Ite Missa est is replaced with Requiescat in pace, with the response being "Amen" instead of Deo gratias.
- The Last Gospel
  - The priest then reads the Last Gospel, the beginning of the Gospel of John, John 1:1–14, which recounts the Incarnation of the Son of God. On certain occasions, as for instance at the Day Mass on Christmas Day, another Gospel passage was read instead because that Gospel is read as the Gospel of the Mass, but Pope John XXIII's revision of the rubrics decreed that on those and on other occasions the Last Gospel should simply be omitted.
  - In the pre-1955 Missal, the Gospel of a Sunday outranked by a feast is still said as a Proper Last Gospel instead of the beginning of St. John's Gospel.
- Marian Antiphons
  - Customarily a Marian Antiphon appointed to the season is sung at the end of Last Gospel and Leonine Prayers, except Maundy Thursday and Good Friday.

=== Prayers of the priest before and after Mass ===
The Tridentine Missal includes prayers for the priest to say before and after Mass.

In later editions of the Roman Missal, including that of 1962, the introductory heading of these prayers indicates that they are to be recited pro opportunitate (as circumstances allow), which in practice means that they are merely optional and may be omitted. The original Tridentine Missal presents most of the prayers as obligatory, indicating as optional only a very long prayer attributed to Saint Ambrose (which later editions divide into seven sections, each to be recited on only one day of the week) and two other prayers attributed to Saint Ambrose and Saint Thomas Aquinas respectively.

In addition to these three prayers, the original Tridentine Missal proposes for the priest to recite before he celebrates Mass the whole of Psalms 83–85, 115, 129 (the numbering is that of the Septuagint and Vulgate), and a series of collect-style prayers. Later editions add, after the three that in the original Missal are only optional, prayers to the Blessed Virgin, Saint Joseph, all the angels and saints, and the saint whose Mass is to be celebrated, but, as has been said, treats as optional all the prayers before Mass, even those originally given as obligatory.

The original Tridentine Missal proposes for recitation by the priest after Mass three prayers, including the Adoro te devote. Later editions place before these three the Canticle of the Three Youths (Dan) with three collects, and follow them with the Anima Christi and seven more prayers, treating as optional even the three prescribed in the original Tridentine Missal.

=== Leonine Prayers ===
From 1884 to 1965, the Holy See prescribed the recitation after Low Mass of certain prayers, originally for the solution of the Roman Question and, after this problem was solved by the Lateran Treaty, "to permit tranquillity and freedom to profess the faith to be restored to the afflicted people of Russia".

These prayers are known as the Leonine Prayers because it was Pope Leo XIII who on 6 January 1884 ordered their recitation throughout the world.

In 1964, with effect from 7 March 1965, the Holy See ended the obligation to recite the Leonine Prayers after Low Mass.

=== Participation of the faithful ===
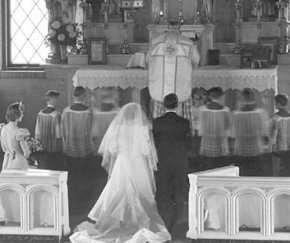
Nuptial Mass

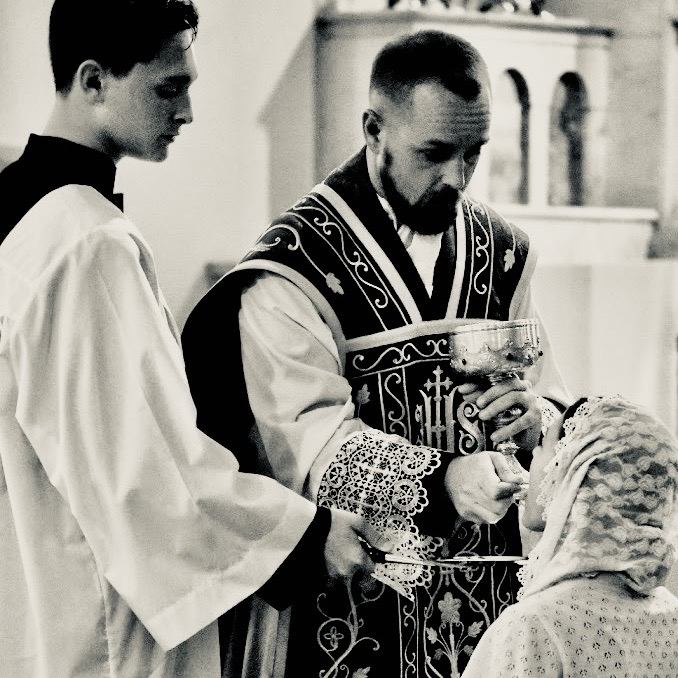
Distribution of Communion at a Tridentine Mass: typically, the faithful kneel at the rail and receive on the tongue, with a paten held under their chin to protect against accidents. It is customary in most places for women to wear a veil.

The participation of the congregation at the Tridentine Mass is interior, involving eye and heart, and exterior by mouth.

Except in the Dialogue Mass form, which arose about 1910 and led to a more active exterior participation of the congregation, the people present at the Tridentine Mass do not recite out loud the prayers of the Mass. Only the server or servers join with the priest in reciting the prayers at the foot of the altar (which include the Confiteor) and in speaking the other responses. (Note: They gave responses to "Kyrie eleison", "Dominus vobiscum", "Per omnia saecula saeculorum", the Gospel reading, the "Orate Fratres", "Sursum Corda", "Gratias agamus Domino Deo nostro", the conclusion of the Lord's Prayer, the "Pax Domini sit semper vobiscum" and the "Ite Missa est") Most of the prayers that the priest says are spoken inaudibly, including almost all the Mass of the Faithful: the offertory prayers, the Canon of the Mass (except for the preface and the final doxology), and (apart from the Agnus Dei) those between the Lord's Prayer and the postcommunion.

At a Solemn Mass or Missa Cantata, a choir sings the servers' responses, except for the Prayers at the Foot of the Altar. The choir sings the Introit, the Kyrie, the Gloria, the Gradual, the Tract or Alleluia, the Credo, the Offertory and Communion antiphons, the Sanctus, and the Agnus Dei. Of these, only the five that form part of the Ordinary of the Mass are usually sung at a Missa Cantata. In addition to the Gregorian Chant music for these, polyphonic compositions exist, some quite elaborate. The priest largely says quietly the words of the chants.

=== Comparison with other Western Christian liturgical rites ===
Jesuit priest Rune P. Thuringer, writing in 1965, noted that "The eucharistic liturgy of the state Church of Sweden, which is Lutheran, is closer in many respects to the [Tridentine] rite of the Roman Mass than that of any other Protestant church."

== Different levels of solemnity of celebration ==
There are various forms of solemnity of celebration of the Tridentine Mass:

- Papal Mass (Latin: Missa Pāpālis): celebrated by the Pope, served by a cardinal-bishop assisting priest, the Apostolic Deacon, more cardinal-deacons, and a greek-catholic deacon and subdeacon, in Latin and Greek, with many unique traditions and vestments. It is a higher form derivative of the pontifical high mass given the pope's position as the Pontifex maximus.
- Pontifical High Mass (Latin: Missa pontificalis): celebrated by a bishop accompanied by an assisting priest, deacon, subdeacon, thurifer, acolytes and other ministers, under the guidance of a priest acting as Master of Ceremonies. Most often the specific parts assigned to deacon and subdeacon are performed by priests. The parts that are said aloud are all chanted, except that the Prayers at the Foot of the Altar, which before the reform of Pope Pius V were said in the sacristy, are said quietly by the bishop with the deacon and the subdeacon, while the choir sings the Introit. The main difference between a pontifical and an ordinary High Mass is that the bishop remains at his cathedra almost all the time until the offertory.
- Solemn or High Mass (Latin: Missa solemnis): offered by a priest accompanied by a deacon and subdeacon and the other ministers mentioned above.
- Missa Cantata (Latin for "sung mass"): celebrated by a priest without deacon and subdeacon, and thus a form of Low Mass, but with some parts (the three variable prayers, the Scripture readings, Preface, Pater Noster, and Ite Missa Est) sung by the priest, and other parts (Introit, Kyrie, Gloria, Gradual, Tract or Alleluia, Credo, Offertory Antiphon, Sanctus and Benedictus, Agnus Dei, and Communion Antiphon) sung by the choir. Incense may be used exactly as at a Solemn Mass with the exception of incensing the celebrant after the Gospel which is not done.
- Low Mass (Latin: Missa privata): the priest sings no part of the Mass, though in some places a choir or the congregation sings, during the Mass, hymns not always directly related to the Mass. Note: the term missa privata was discouraged in 1962 for the misunderstanding of privata to mean private/non-public rather than 'deprived' of the fullness of ceremony.

In its article "The Liturgy of the Mass", the 1917 Catholic Encyclopedia describes how, when concelebration ceased to be practised in Western Europe, Low Mass became distinguished from High Mass:

The separate celebrations then involved the building of many altars in one church and the reduction of the ritual to the simplest possible form. The deacon and subdeacon were in this case dispensed with; the celebrant took their part as well as his own. One server took the part of the choir and of all the other ministers, everything was said instead of being sung, the incense and kiss of peace were omitted. So we have the well-known rite of low Mass (missa privata). This then reacted on high Mass (missa solemnis), so that at high Mass too the celebrant himself recites everything, even though it be sung by the deacon, subdeacon, or choir.

On the origin of the "Missa Cantata", the same source gives the following information about the Tridentine concept at the time:

high Mass is the norm; it is only in the complete rite with deacon and subdeacon that the ceremonies can be understood. Thus, the rubrics of the Ordinary of the Mass always suppose that the Mass is high. Low Mass, said by a priest alone with one server, is a shortened and simplified form of the same thing. Its ritual can be explained only by a reference to high Mass. For instance, the celebrant goes over to the north side of the altar to read the Gospel, because that is the side to which the deacon goes in procession at high Mass; he turns round always by the right, because at high Mass he should not turn his back to the deacon and so on. A sung Mass (missa Cantata) is a modern compromise. It is really a low Mass, since the essence of high Mass is not the music but the deacon and subdeacon. Only in churches which have no ordained person except one priest, and in which high Mass is thus impossible, is it allowed to celebrate the Mass (on Sundays and feasts) with most of the adornment borrowed from high Mass, with singing and (generally) with incense.

A Missa brevis is a musical setting of a Mass where the choir and musicians do not perform some parts of the Ordinary of the Mass they potentially could, such as the Gloria or Creed. This is not related to the distinctions above.

== Revision of the Roman Missal ==
Pius XII began in earnest the work of revising the Roman Missal with a revision of the rites of Holy Week, which, after an experimental period beginning in 1951, was made obligatory in 1955.

On 4 December 1963, the Second Vatican Council decreed in Chapter II of its Constitution on the Sacred Liturgy Sacrosanctum Concilium:

[T]he rite of the Mass is to be revised ... the rites are to be simplified, due care being taken to preserve their substance. Parts which with the passage of time came to be duplicated, or were added with little advantage, are to be omitted. Other parts which suffered loss through accidents of history are to be restored to the vigor they had in the days of the holy Fathers, as may seem useful or necessary. The treasures of the Bible are to be opened up more lavishly so that a richer fare may be provided for the faithful at the table of God's word ... A suitable place may be allotted to the vernacular in Masses which are celebrated with the people ... communion under both kinds may be granted when the bishops think fit...as, for instance, to the newly ordained in the Mass of their sacred ordination, to the newly professed in the Mass of their religious profession, and to the newly baptized in the Mass which follows their baptism...

The instruction Inter Oecumenici of 26 September 1964 initiated the application to the Mass of the decisions that the Council had taken less than a year before. Permission was given for use, only in Mass celebrated with the people, of the vernacular language, especially in the Biblical readings and the reintroduced Prayers of the Faithful, but, "until the whole of the Ordinary of the Mass has been revised", in the chants (Kyrie, Gloria, Creed, Sanctus, Agnus Dei, and the entrance, offertory and communion antiphons) and in the parts that involved dialogue with the people, and in the Our Father, which the people could now recite entirely together with the priest. Most Episcopal Conferences quickly approved interim vernacular translations, generally different from country to country, and, after having them confirmed by the Holy See, published them in 1965. Other changes included the omission of Psalm 43 (42) at the start of Mass and the Last Gospel at the end, both of which Pope Pius V had first inserted into the Missal (having previously been private prayers said by the priest in the sacristy), and the Leonine Prayers of Pope Leo XIII. The Canon of the Mass, which continued to be recited silently, was kept in Latin.

Three years later, the instruction Tres abhinc annos of 4 May 1967 gave permission for use of the vernacular even in the Canon of the Mass, and allowed it to be said audibly and even, in part, to be chanted; the vernacular could be used even at Mass celebrated without the people being present. Use of the maniple was made optional, and at three ceremonies at which the cope was previously the obligatory vestment the chasuble could be used instead.

Pope Paul VI continued implementation of the Council's directives, ordering with Apostolic Constitution Missale Romanum of Holy Thursday, 3 April 1969, publication of a new official edition of the Roman Missal, which appeared (in Latin) in 1970.

=== Opposition to latest revisions ===
Some Traditionalist Catholics reject to a greater or lesser extent the changes made since 1950. None advocate returning to the original (1570) form of the liturgy, though some may perhaps wish a re-establishment of its form before Pius X's revision of the rubrics in 1911. Some are critical of the 1955 changes in the liturgy of Palm Sunday and the Easter Triduum and in the liturgical calendar (see General Roman Calendar of Pope Pius XII), and instead use the General Roman Calendar as in 1954, such as the Society of Saint Pius V (SSPV) and Istituto Mater Boni Consilii (IMBC). Others accept the 1955 changes by Pius XII, but not those of Pope John XXIII, such as the Congregation of Mary Immaculate Queen (CMRI). Others again, in accordance with the authorization granted by Pope Benedict XVI in Summorum Pontificum, use the Missal and calendar as it was in 1962. They argue that many of the changes made to the liturgy in 1955 and onward were largely the work of liturgist Annibale Bugnini, whom traditionalists say was more interested in innovation than the preservation of the apostolic traditions of the Church.

Some Catholics contend that, unlike earlier reforms, the revision of 1969–1970 which replaced the Tridentine Mass with the Mass of Pope Paul VI represented a major break with the past. They consider that the content of the revised liturgy is, in Catholic terms, seriously deficient and defective; a small minority of these Catholics hold that it is displeasing to God, and that no Catholic should attend it. (Note: Pope Benedict XVI has declared this contention unfounded, writing: "There is no contradiction between the two editions of the Roman Missal. In the history of the liturgy there is growth and progress, but no rupture. [...] Needless to say, in order to experience full communion, the priests of the communities adhering to the former usage cannot, as a matter of principle, exclude celebrating according to the new books. The total exclusion of the new rite would not in fact be consistent with the recognition of its value and holiness" (Letter to the Bishops on the occasion of the publication of the Apostolic Letter motu proprio data Summorum Pontificum).)

When a preliminary text of two of the sections of the revised Missal was published in 1969, Archbishop Marcel Lefebvre (who later established Society of Saint Pius X) gathered a group of twelve theologians, who, under his direction, wrote a study of the text. They stated that it "represents, both as a whole and in its details, a striking departure from the Catholic theology of the Mass as it was formulated in Session 22 of the Council of Trent". Cardinal Alfredo Ottaviani, a former Prefect of the Sacred Congregation for the Doctrine of the Faith, supported this study with a letter of 25 September 1969 to Pope Paul VI. Cardinal Antonio Bacci signed the same letter. The critical study became known as "the Ottaviani Intervention". Cardinal Ottaviani subsequently stated in writing that he had not intended his letter to be made public, and that Pope Paul VI's doctrinal exposition, on 19 November and 26 November 1969, of the revised liturgy in its definitive form meant that "no one can be genuinely scandalized any more".

From the 1960s onwards, Western countries have experienced a drop in Mass attendance. For example, in the United States, 75% of Catholics attended church weekly in 1958, declining to 25% attending by 2002; another study suggests a peak weekly attendance of 72% in 1959–60. Western countries also saw a decline in seminary enrollments and in the number of priests (in the United States, from 1,575 ordinations in 1954 to 450 in 2002), and a general erosion of belief in the doctrines of the Catholic faith. Opponents of the revision of the Mass liturgy argue, citing opinion poll evidence in their support, that the revision contributed to this decline. Others, pointing, among other considerations, to the fact that, globally, there are more priests and seminarians now than in previous years (in 1970, there were 72,991 major seminarians worldwide, in 2002, there were 113,199, an increase of 55%, at a time, however, when there was an increase of global population of 64%), suggests that the apparent decline of Catholic practice in the West is due to the general influence of secularism and liberalism on Western societies rather than to developments within the Church. In the United States, Traditional Catholic parishes have been growing since 2007, even as overall Catholic attendance continues to decline. In 2021, it was estimated that 150,000 Catholics regularly attend the Tridentine Mass in the US, representing less than 1% of the 21 million Catholics regularly attending Mass throughout the US.

== Attitudes of Popes since the Second Vatican Council ==
=== Pope Paul VI ===
Following the introduction of the Mass of Paul VI in 1969–1970, the Holy See granted a significant number of permissions for the use of the former liturgy. For example, elderly priests were not required to switch to celebrating the new form. In England and Wales, occasional celebrations of the Tridentine Mass were allowed in virtue of what became known as the "Agatha Christie indult". There was no general worldwide legal framework allowing for the celebration of the rite. Following the rise of the Traditionalist Catholic movement in the 1970s, Pope Paul VI reportedly declined to liberalise its use further on the grounds that it had become a politically charged symbol associated with opposition to his policies.

=== Pope John Paul II ===
In 1984, the Holy See sent a letter known as Quattuor abhinc annos to the presidents of the world's Episcopal Conferences. This document empowered diocesan bishops to authorise, on certain conditions, celebrations of the Tridentine Mass for priests and laypeople who requested them. In 1988, following the excommunication of Archbishop Marcel Lefebvre and the four bishops consecrated by him, the Pope issued the motu proprio Ecclesia Dei, which stated that "respect must everywhere be shown for the feelings of all those who are attached to the Latin liturgical tradition". The Pope urged bishops to give "a wide and generous application" to the provisions of Quattuor abhinc annos, and established the Pontifical Commission Ecclesia Dei to oversee relations between Rome and Traditionalist Catholics.

In 2001 he lifted excommunication from traditionalist bishop Licínio Rangel after full sumbission to the Roman pontiff. He had led Priestly Society of Saint John Mary Vianney and had been consecrated bishop without papal mandate by SSPX bishops in 1991. For the priests of the society John Paul II established Personal Apostolic Administration of Saint John Mary Vianney and bishop Rangel was its first ordinary. It has been the only particular church (diocese-like structure) dedicated to celebrating TLM.

=== Pope Benedict XVI ===
As a cardinal, Joseph Ratzinger was regarded as having a particular interest in the liturgy, and as being favourable towards the pre-Vatican II Mass. Before his election he celebrated it on a number of occasions. He criticized the erratic way in which, contrary to official policy, many priests celebrated the post-Vatican II form.

In September 2006, the Pontifical Commission Ecclesia Dei established the Institute of the Good Shepherd, made up of former members of the Society of St. Pius X, in Bordeaux, France, with permission to use the Tridentine liturgy. This step was met with some discontent from French clergy, and thirty priests wrote an open letter to the Pope. In line with its previous stance, the Society of St Pius X rejected the move.

Following repeated rumours that the use of the Tridentine Mass would be liberalised, the Pope issued a motu proprio called Summorum Pontificum on 7 July 2007, together with an accompanying letter to the world's bishops. The declaring that "the Roman Missal promulgated by Paul VI is the ordinary expression of the lex orandi (law of prayer) of the Catholic Church of the Latin rite. Nevertheless, the Roman Missal promulgated by St. Pius V and reissued by St. John XXIII is to be considered as an extraordinary expression of that same 'Lex orandi'". He further stated that "the 1962 Missal ... was never juridically abrogated". He replaced with new rules those of Quattuor Abhinc Annos on use of the older form: essentially, authorization for using the 1962 form for parish Masses and those celebrated on public occasions such as a wedding is devolved from the local bishop to the priest in charge of a church, and "any priest of the Latin rite" may use the 1962 Roman Missal in "Masses celebrated without the people", a term that does not exclude attendance by other worshippers, lay or clergy. While requests by groups of Catholics wishing to use the Tridentine liturgy in parish Masses are to be dealt with by the parish priest (or the rector of the church) rather than, as before, by the local bishop, the Pope and Cardinal Darío Castrillón stated that the bishops' authority is not thereby undermined. (Note: In the letter to bishops by which he accompanied the motu proprio the Pope told them that the new regulations "do not in any way lessen your own authority and responsibility, either for the liturgy or for the pastoral care of your faithful." Cardinal Castrillón stated: "The Pope has not changed the Code of Canon Law. The bishop is the moderator of the liturgy in his own diocese. But the Apostolic See is entitled to shape the sacred liturgy of the universal Church. And a bishop must act in harmony with the Apostolic See and must guarantee the rights of every believer, including that of being able to attend the mass of Saint Pius V, as extraordinary form of the rite".(see "30Days". June 2007. Archived from the original on 2007-09-27.))

=== Pope Francis ===
Pope Francis on 16 July 2021 released an Apostolic Letter Motu Proprio, Traditionis custodes, on the use of the Roman Liturgy prior to the Reform of 1970. In Traditionis custodes, the Pope says "the liturgical books promulgated by Saint Paul VI and Saint John Paul II, in conformity with the decrees of Vatican Council II, are the unique expression of the lex orandi of the Roman Rite". He also greatly restricted the use of the Tridentine Mass.

Pope Francis added that it is the exclusive competence of the local bishop to authorize the use of the 1962 Roman Missal in his diocese, according to the guidelines of the Apostolic See.

Pope Francis expressed to the Bishops of the world in his letter accompanying the motu proprio that there is a need in "due time" for those who are attached to the 1962 Mass to return to the celebration of the Mass of Paul VI.

In June 2022, Pope Francis issued the Apostolic Letter Desiderio Desideravi, where he stated that he did not believe the 1962 Missal was the path forward for the Church, insisting that the Church could not "go back to the ritual form which the Council Fathers sought the need to reform".

In February 2023, Pope Francis issued a rescript, clarifying that bishops must obtain authorization from the Holy See before granting permission for parish churches to be used for Eucharistic celebrations with the preconciliar rite and before allowing priests ordained after 16 July 2021 to use the 1962 Roman Missal.

=== Pope Leo XIV ===
While Pope Leo XIV has not so far commented on celebrations of the Tridentine Mass, it was reported in September 2025 that he had granted permission for a celebration of that Mass in St. Peter's Basilica to be held at the end of the following month, as part of an annual traditionalist pilgrimage to Rome. This would mark the first time such celebrations will occur since the promulgation of Traditionis custodes. Additionally in September of 2025, Pope Leo XIV addressed the concerns about the Tridentine Mass, stating that "you can say Mass in Latin right now" but that the differences between the Tridentine Mass and the Vatican II Mass are "obviously very complicated."

=== Present regulations and practice ===
The regulations set out in Traditionis custodes provide that:

- The bishop of the diocese is the sole authority to decide whether the celebration of Mass according to the 1962 Roman Missal may take place in his diocese. He must abide by the following norms:
  - The bishop must decide the locations and times when Mass according to the 1962 rubrics may take place. This cannot occur within parochial churches, nor can the bishop erect new personal parishes dedicated to the celebration of Mass according to the 1962 Missal.
  - The bishop must ensure that the existing communities that celebrate Mass according to the 1962 rubrics are effective for the spiritual growth of his people, and he has the option to revoke the permissions given to these communities. He may not authorize the establishment of new groups that gather for celebration according to the 1962 Roman Missal.
  - The bishop should appoint a priest to act as a delegate for the pastoral care of the groups of the faithful attached to the 1962 liturgical rites. The priest must understand the Missal of 1962 well, must be well-versed in Ecclesiastical Latin, and must exhibit pastoral charity and a desire for ecclesial communion.
- Priests ordained before the publication of Traditionis custodes (16 July 2021) who celebrated Mass according to the 1962 Missal before the publication of Traditionis custodes should request permission from the bishop of the diocese to continue to celebrate Mass according to the 1962 rubrics.
- Priests ordained after the publication of Traditionis custodes must submit a formal request to the bishop of the diocese in order to gain permission to celebrate Mass according to the 1962 Roman Missal. The bishop must then consult the Holy See before the bishop grants permission to the priest.
- The scriptural readings in a Mass celebrated according to the 1962 Missal are to be proclaimed in the vernacular according to the translation approved by the respective Episcopal Conference.
- Communities belonging to institutes of consecrated life and societies of apostolic life which use the 1962 Missal for conventual or "community" celebration in their oratories fall under the competence of the Congregation for Institutes of Consecrated Life and Societies of Apostolic Life, which has the authority to grant and revoke permission to celebrate Mass according to the 1962 Missal.

The motu proprio Traditionis custodes abrogates all previous norms, instructions, permissions and customs that do not conform to it.

In December 2021, additional restrictions and guidelines were issued by the Congregation for Divine Worship and the Discipline of the Sacraments in the form of a Responsa ad dubia:

- if a non-parish church, oratory or chapel cannot be found for a group to gather to celebrate the Mass according to the 1962 Missal, the diocesan bishop can ask the Holy See for permission to use a parish church; it should not be listed in the parish schedule and when a non-parish church, oratory or chapel becomes available, the permission to celebrate the Mass in the parish church will be withdrawn.
- The diocesan bishop is only authorized to grant permission to personal parishes dedicated to the celebration of the 1962 Missal, to be able to celebrate the sacraments of Baptism, Reconciliation, Matrimony and Extreme Unction according to the pre-Vatican II Roman Ritual.
- The diocesan bishop is not authorized to grant permission for the use of the Pontificale Romanum (the Pontifical Missal) issued in 1962. This also means that the sacraments of Holy Orders and Confirmation may only be celebrated in the post-Vatican II form.
- In order for a priest to be granted permission to celebrate the Mass according to the Missal of 1962, he must recognize the validity and legitimacy of concelebration and is not to refuse to concelebrate at the diocesan Chrism Mass.
- No vernacular lectionaries may be published that reproduce the cycle of readings from the 1962 Rite.
- The faculty to celebrate according to the 1962 missal, granted by a diocesan bishop to a priest, is restricted to the territory of that diocese.
- Deacons and instituted ministers participating in the celebration of Mass according to the 1962 missal, must have permission from the diocesan bishop to do so.
- A priest who has been granted faculties to celebrate the 1962 missal is not permitted to celebrate both the Mass according to the 1962 missal and the post-Vatican II missal on the same weekday.
- A priest who has been granted faculties to celebrate the 1962 missal is not permitted to celebrate the Mass according to the 1962 missal twice on the same day for two groups of faithful who have received authorisation.

In December 2021, in an interview with the National Catholic Register, Arthur Roche, the Prefect for the Congregation in charge of the implementation of Traditionis custodes, reiterated Pope Francis' statement that the Mass according to the Missal promulgated by Paul VI and John Paul II, is "the unique expression of the lex orandi of the Roman Rite". Roche also emphasized that "the liturgy is never simply a matter of personal tastes or preference" and that the lex orandi is "determined by the Church and not individual members". Roche also stated that continuing to allow the celebration of Mass according to the Tridentine form was a concession and that the promotion of the Tridentine Mass has "been curtailed".

In February 2022, the Priestly Fraternity of Saint Peter, a society of apostolic life dedicated to the celebration of the Traditional Liturgy, was granted full permission to celebrate the Traditional Mass, Breviary, Sacraments and the Pontifical Missal. The permission is restricted to the Fraternity's churches and oratories, unless the local ordinary grants permission for priests of the fraternity to celebrate elsewhere in the Diocese, with the exception of private masses.

== See also ==
- Ad orientem (direction the priest stands, as opposed to Versus populum)
- Communion-plate
- List of communities using the Tridentine Mass
- Pre-Tridentine Mass
- Sacred language
- Una Voce (lay organisations promoting the Tridentine Mass)
- Western Rite Orthodoxy
