= Postcommunion =

Catholic prayer

The Postcommunion prayer, or Prayer after Communion, in Catholic liturgy, is the text said or sung following the Communion of the Mass.

== History ==
=== Early church ===
The prayer after communion was mentioned in the first century Didache.

The Communion act finishes the essential Eucharistic service, and early Masses, as described by Justin Martyr, did not have anything afterward. However, prayers were later added. The earliest complete liturgy extant, that of the "Apostolic Constitutions", contains two such prayers, a thanksgiving and a blessing.

A significant resemblance between the Roman Rite and that of the "Apostolic Constitutions" is that at Rome, too, there were formerly at every Mass two prayers of the same nature. In the "Leonine Sacramentary" they have no title, but according to Adrian Fortescue, "their character is obvious". The Gelasian Sacramentary calls the first postcommunio, the second ad populum.

In both sacramentaries these two prayers form part of the normal Mass said throughout the year, though not every Mass has both; the prayers "ad populum" in the latter book are comparatively rare. They also begin to change their character. The formerly constant terms tuere, protege, etc. are rarer; many are ordinary collects with no pronounced idea of prayers for blessing and protection.

In the "Gregorian Sacramentary" the second prayer, now called Super populum, occurs almost only from Septuagesima to Easter; the first, Ad complendum, continues throughout the year, but both have lost much of their original character. The Ad complendum prayer (which became the post-communion) has become a collect formed on the model of the collect at the beginning of Mass, though generally it keeps some allusion to the Communion just received. That is still the state of these prayers after the Communion.

The second, Oratio super populum, is said only in ferial Masses in Lent. This restriction apparently results from the shortening of the Mass (which explains many omissions and abbreviations) and the tendency of Lent to keep longer forms, such as more than two lessons. Medieval commentators explain this mystically; Honorius thinks the prayer to be a substitute for the Eastern blessed bread (antidoron).

The Oratio super populum is now always the prayer at vespers on the same day. It has been suggested that its use at Mass in Lent may be a remnant of a custom, now kept only on Holy Saturday, of singing vespers at the end of Mass. The first prayer, called Ad complendum in the "Gregorian Sacramentary", became the modern Postcommunion, now its official name. Its name was uncertain through the Middle Ages. Durandus calls it merely Oratio novissima, using the name Postcommunio for the Communion antiphon.

The first "Roman Ordo" calls the prayer Oratio ad complendum (xxi); Rupert of Deutz calls it Ad complendum. But others give it the modern name, and so do many medieval missals (e.g. the Sarum).

The Postcommunion has lost much of its original character as a thanksgiving prayer and has absorbed the idea of the old Oratio ad populum. It is now always a petition, though the note of thanksgiving is often included (e.g. in the Mass Statuit, for a confessor pontiff). It has been affected by the Collect, on which it is modelled, although there is generally an allusion to the Communion.

=== Before Vatican II ===
Every Postcommunion (and secret) corresponds to a collect. These are the three fundamental prayers of any given Proper Mass. The Postcommunion is said or chanted exactly like the Collect. First comes that of the Mass celebrated; then, if other Masses are commemorated, their Postcommunions follow in the same order and with the same final conclusion as the collects.

After the Communion, when the celebrant has arranged the chalice, he goes to the epistle side and reads the Communion antiphon. He then comes to the middle and says or sings "Dominus Vobiscum" ("The Lord be with you"; in the early Middle Ages he did not turn to the people this time), goes back to the Epistle side, and says or sings one or more Postcommunions, exactly as the collects.

At ferial Masses in Lent the Oratio super populum follows the last Postcommunion. The celebrant sings Oremus; the deacon turning towards the people chants: Humiliate capita vestra Deo, on do with the cadence la, do, si, si, do for the last five syllables. Meanwhile, everyone, including the celebrant, bows the head. The deacon turns towards the altar and the celebrant chants the prayer appointed in the Mass. At low Mass the celebrant himself says the same text and does not turn towards the people. The deacon's exclamation apparently was introduced when this prayer became a speciality of Lent (Durandus mentions it).

== Contemporary usage ==
In the Mass of Paul VI, the postcommunion is known as the Prayer after Communion. It is the final presidential prayer, sung or recited audibly by the celebrant and concluded by the congregational response, "Amen".

== See also ==
- Thanksgiving after Communion
