= Oremus =

Invitation to pray in some Christian churches

Oremus (Latin: "Let us pray") is the invitation to pray, said before short prayers in the Catholic Mass the Anglican and Episcopalian Holy Eucharist and Divine Offices, and the Lutheran Divine Service, as well as other Western Christian liturgies.

It is used as a single exclamation in the East (in the rites of the Assyrian and Syriac Orthodox churches), denoting the imperative "Pray" or "Stand for prayer" (in the Coptic Church); most commonly, however with a further determination, "Let us pray to the Lord" (τοῦ Κυρίου δεηθῶμεν, used throughout the Byzantine Rite, where the laity replies with Kyrie Eleison before the priest recites the prayer), and so on. Louis Duchesne thought that the Gallican Collects were also introduced by the word "Oremus" ("Origines du Culte", Paris, 1898, 103). That was not the case in the Mozarabic Rite, where the celebrant uses the word only twice, before the Agios and Pater noster.

Oremus is said (or sung) in the Roman Rite, the Anglican/Episcopal rite, and Lutheran Rite before all separate collects in the Mass, Office, or on other occasions (but several collects may be joined with one Oremus). It is also used before the Post-Communion, the offertory, and before the introduction to the Pater noster and other short prayers (e.g., Aufer a nobis) in the form of collects.

It appears that the Oremus did not originally apply to the prayer that now follows it. It is thought that it was once an invitation to private prayer, very likely with further direction as to the object, as is now the case in the liturgy for Good Friday (Oremus pro ecclesia sancta Dei). The deacon then said: Flectamus genua ("let us kneel"), and all knelt in silent prayer. After a time the people were told to stand up (Levate), and finally the celebrant collected all the petitions in one short sentence said aloud (hence, the collect).
