= Canon of the Mass =

Anaphora prayer sometimes used in Roman Catholic liturgies

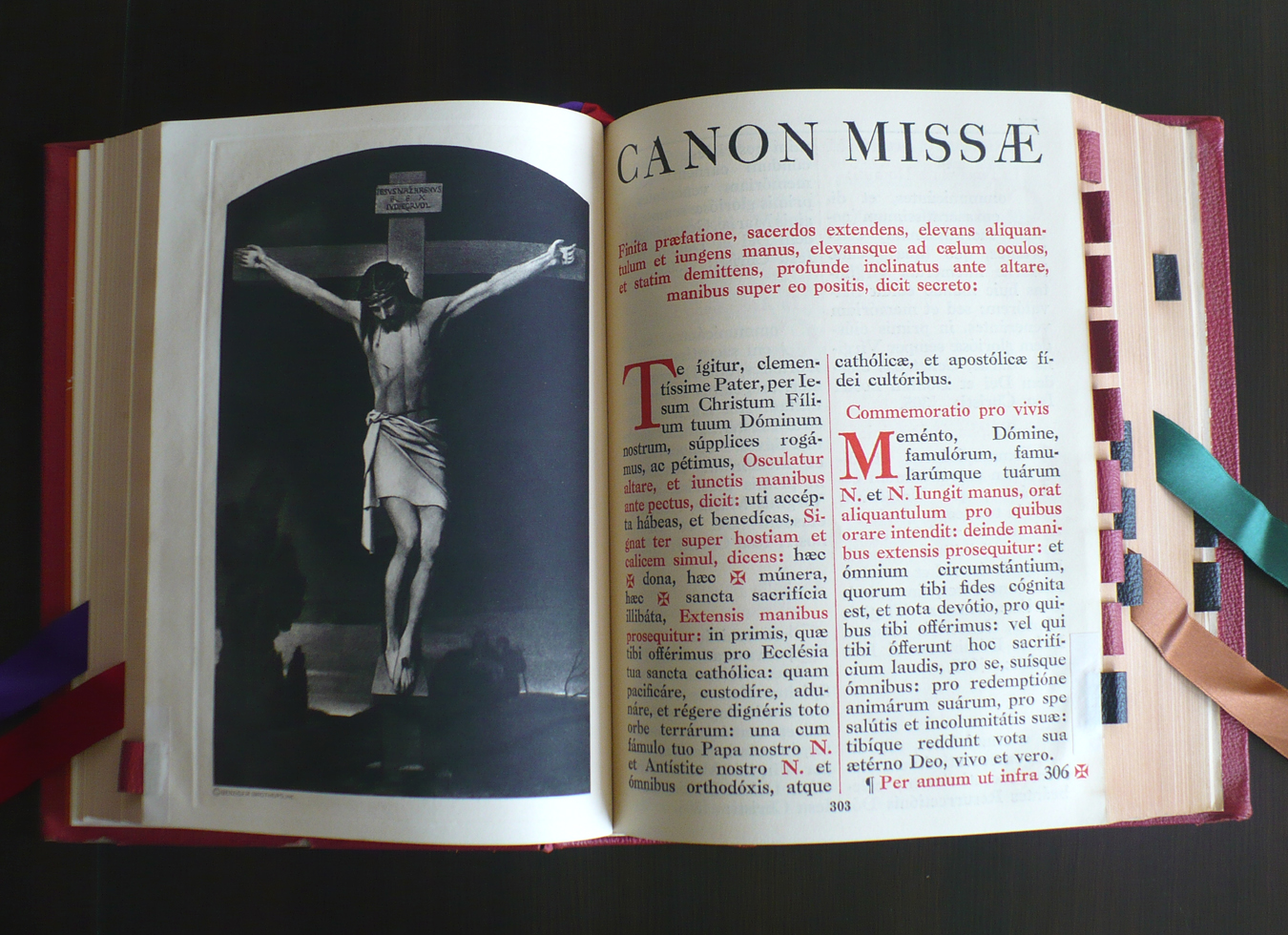
1962 edition of the Roman Missal with the Canon Missæ

The Canon of the Mass (Latin: Canon Missæ), also known as the Canon of the Roman Mass and in the Mass of Paul VI as the Roman Canon or Eucharistic Prayer I, is the oldest anaphora used in the Roman Rite of Mass. The name Canon Missæ was used in the Missal of the Tridentine Mass from the first typical edition of Pope Pius V in 1570 to that of Pope John XXIII in 1962 to describe the part of the Mass of the Roman Rite that began after the Sanctus with the words Te igitur. All editions preceding that of 1962 (Note: From the very printing of the first edition (reproduced by Libreria Editrice Vaticana in 1998, ISBN 88-209-2547-8) to the 1920 typical edition. This, of course, does not apply to hand missals for the use of the faithful.) place the indication "Canon Missae" at the head of each page from that point until the end of the Mass; that of 1962 does so only until the page preceding the Pater Noster and places the heading "Ordo Missae" on the following pages.

Before 1962, there were divergent opinions about the point where the Canon of the Mass ended. Some considered that it ended where indicated in the 1962 Roman Missal, (Note: This was the opinion expressed by Adrian Fortescue in the article on the Canon of the Mass that he wrote for the Catholic Encyclopedia. The electronic reproduction speaks confusingly of "the Amen before the Embolism of the Pater Noster (omnis honor et gloria, per omnia sæcula sæculorum, Amen)". The embolism follows the Pater Noster and the Amen in question is the concluding word of the doxology that, in the 1962 edition of the Roman Missal, clearly ends the Canon of the Mass, and that comes before the Pater Noster.) others where indicated in the earlier editions from 1570 onwards (the end of Mass), others at the conclusion of the Embolism (Libera nos...) that expands on the final "Sed libera nos a malo" petition of the Pater Noster.

Before the 1970 revision of the Roman Missal, the Canon was the only anaphora used in the Roman Rite. The editions of the Roman Missal issued since 1970, which contain three other newly composed Eucharistic prayers, names it as the "Roman Canon" and places it as the first (Note: This Eucharistic Prayer reproduces the text of what was previously called the Canon of the Mass, but permits some phrases, such as the repeated "Per Christum Dominum nostrum", to be omitted, places the phrase "Mysterium fidei" after, not within, the Words of Institution, and adds, at that point, an acclamation by the people.) of its four Eucharistic prayers, and place the words "Prex Eucharistica" before the dialogue that precedes the Preface (Note: This is a return to the division of the Mass indicated in the oldest Sacramentary that contains a Eucharistic Prayer or Canon of the Mass: it puts the heading "Incipit Canon Actionis" before the Sursum Corda) and the new heading "Ritus communionis" before the introduction to the Pater Noster.

== Name and place of the Canon ==
One can only conjecture the original reason for the use of the term Canon. Walafrid Strabo says: "This action is called the Canon because it is the lawful and regular confection of the Sacrament." Benedict XIV says: "Canon is the same word as rule; the Church uses this name to mean that the Canon of the Mass is the firm rule according to which the Sacrifice of the New Testament is to be celebrated." It has been suggested that the present Canon was a compromise between the older Greek Anaphoras and variable Latin Eucharistic prayers formerly used in Rome, and that it was ordered in the fourth century, possibly by Pope Damasus I (366–84). The name Canon would then mean a fixed standard to which all must henceforth conform, as opposed to the different and changeable prayers used before. In any case it is noticeable that whereas the lessons, collects, and Preface of the Mass constantly vary, the Canon is almost unchangeable in every Mass. Another name for the Canon is Actio. Agere, like the Greek dran, is often used as meaning to sacrifice. Leo I, in writing to Dioscorus of Alexandria, uses the expression "in qua [sc. basilica] agitur", meaning "in which Mass is said". Other names are Legitimum, Prex, Agenda, Regula, Secretum Missae.

The whole Canon is essentially one long prayer, the Eucharistic prayer that the Eastern Churches call the Anaphora. And the Preface is part of this prayer. Introduced in Rome as everywhere by the little dialogue "Sursum corda" and so on, it begins with the words "Vere dignum et iustum est". Interrupted for a moment by the people, who take up the angels' words: Sanctus, sanctus, sanctus, etc., the priest goes on with the same prayer, obviously joining the next part to the beginning by the word igitur". It is not then surprising that we find in the oldest sacramentary that contains a Canon, the Gelasian, the heading "Incipit Canon Actionis" placed before the Sursum Corda; so that the preface was then still looked upon as part of the Canon.

However, by the seventh century or so the Canon was considered as beginning with the secret prayers after the Sanctus. The point at which it may be considered as ending was equally uncertain at one time. There has never been any sort of point or indication in the text of the Missal to close the period begun by the heading Canon Missæ, so that from looking at the text we should conclude that the Canon goes on to the end of the Mass. Even as late as Pope Benedict XIV there were "those who think that the Lord's Prayer makes up part of the Canon". On the other hand the "Ordo Rom. I" implies that it ends before the Pater Noster.

The two views are reconciled by the distinction between the "Canon Consecrationis" and the "Canon Communionis" that occurs constantly in the Middle Ages. The "Canon Communionis" then would begin with the Pater Noster and go on to the end of the people's Communion. The Post-Communion to the Blessing, or to the end of the last Gospel, forms the last division of the Mass, the thanksgiving and dismissal. It must then be added that in modern times by Canon we mean only the "Canon Consecrationis".

The Canon, together with the rest of the Order of Mass, is now printed in the middle of the Missal, since 1970 between the Proper of the Seasons and the Proper of the Saints, in the immediately preceding centuries between the propers for Holy Saturday and Easter Day. Until about the ninth century, it stood towards the end of the sacramentary, among the "Missae quotidianae" and after the Proper Masses (so in the Gelasian book). Thence it moved to the very beginning. From the eleventh century it was constantly placed in the middle, where it is now, and since the use of complete Missals "according to the use of the Roman Curia" (from the thirteenth century) that has been its place invariably. It is the part of the book that is used far more than any other, so it is obviously convenient that it should occur where a book lies open best – in the middle. The same reason of practical use that gave it this place led to the common custom of printing the Canon on vellum, even when the rest of the Missal was on paper; vellum stands wear much better than paper.

== History of the Canon ==
Little is known of the liturgical formulas of the Church of Rome before the second century. In the First Apology of Justin Martyr (c. 165) an early outline of the liturgy is found, including a celebration of the Eucharist (thanksgiving) with an Anaphora, with the final Amen, that was of what would now be classified as Eastern type and celebrated in Greek.

The use of Latin as a liturgical language seems to have occurred first in the Roman province of Africa, corresponding approximately to present-day Tunisia, where knowledge of Greek was not as widespread as in Rome. Pope Victor I (c. 190 – c. 202), who was born in that Roman province, is said to have been the first to use Latin in the liturgy of Rome, perhaps only for the readings; but the earliest textual evidence for the adoption of Latin for the Eucharistic Prayer dates from 360–382. Latin may have been used in the liturgy for some groups in Rome earlier than that, just as, to judge from a quotation in Greek from a Roman oratio oblationis of 360, other groups will have continued to use Greek even later in that formerly cosmopolitan city.

The first Christians in Rome were chiefly people who came from the East and spoke Greek. The founding of Constantinople naturally drew such people thither rather than to Rome, and then Christianity at Rome began to spread among the Roman population, so that at last the bulk of the Christian population in Rome spoke Latin. Hence the change in the language of the liturgy. ...The liturgy was said (in Latin) first in one church and then in more, until the Greek liturgy was driven out, and the clergy ceased to know Greek. About 415 or 420 we find a Pope saying he was unable to answer a letter from some Eastern bishops, because he had no one who could write Greek.

"The Roman Canon is not in its primitive form" but has many "awkward transitions" that show that it is "evidently an abbreviated and transposed version of a more ancient eucharistic prayer".

At least in its final form it is not structured as a single unitary prayer. Since 1474 it was printed in paragraphs, marked with initial letters and divided by rubrics (so that some pre-Vatican II missal users took it to be a set of discrete prayers). Several of the paragraphs had a conclusion – Per Christum Dominum Nostrum – with interpolated Amens. The Prayer thus appeared as a series of discrete prayers, and one can understand the force of the remark of Thomas Cranmer's chaplain Thomas Become, when he described it as a "hotch-potch... a very beggar's cloak, cobbled, clouted and patched with a multitude of popish rags."

Some of the prayers of the present Roman Canon can be traced to the Eastern Liturgy of St. James. Several of the prayers were in use before 400 in almost exactly their present form. Others (the Communicantes, the Hanc igitur, and the post-consecration Memento etiam and Nobis quoque) were added during the following century.

After the time of Pope Gregory I (590–604), who made at least one change in the text, the Canon remained largely unchanged in Rome. Not so elsewhere. The 11th-century Missal of Robert of Jumièges, Archbishop of Canterbury, interpolates the names of Saint Gertrude, Saint Gregory, Saint Ethraelda, and other English saints in the Communicantes. The Missale Drummondiense inserts the names of Saint Patrick and Saint Gregory the Great. And in several Medieval French Missals the Canon contained the names of Saint Martin and Saint Hilary.

Pope Pius V's imposition of the Roman Missal in 1570 restrained any tendency to vary the text of the Canon. According to one source, in 1604 Pope Clement VIII, as well as modifying some of the rubrics, altered the text of the Canon by excluding a mention of the king. In the early nineteenth century, the king was mentioned by name in England within the Canon. Although other parts of the Missal were modified from time to time, the Canon remained quite unchanged, apart from this variation, from 1570 until Pope John XXIII's insertion of a mention of Saint Joseph immediately after that of the Virgin Mary.

== Mystical interpretations ==
The historian of liturgy Adrian Fortescue wrote that, after the Bible, the Canon of the Mass was what received the most elaborate mystical explanations. By the time they began the Canon was unquestioned as the most sacred rite of the Church and, with no regard for its historical development, they conceived mystic and allegorical reasons for its divisions, expressions, rites, just as it stood – even for its initial letter T.

These interpretations inevitably disagreed among themselves and contradicted each other, dividing the Canon where they liked – as far as possible by a holy number, such as 3, 7 or 12 – and then linked each of these divisions to some epoch of our Lord's life, or to one of the Gifts of the Holy Ghost, or – if the divisions made are 8 – to one of the Beatitudes. The arrangements are extremely ingenious.

Some of the principal authors of such interpretations were William Durandus, Bishop of Mende (whose work is important as an account of the prayers and ceremonies of the thirteenth century), Benedict XIV and Cardinal John Bona. A favourite idea is that the Ordinary to the Sanctus, with its readings, represents Christ's public life and teaching; the Canon is a type of the passion and death, and is said in silence, because, though Christ taught plainly, he did not open his mouth when he was accused and suffered. From Durandus comes the idea of dividing the Mass according to the four kinds of prayer mentioned in 1 Timothy 2:1: it is an "obsecratio" (supplication) to the Secret, an "oratio" (prayer) to the Pater Noster, a "postulatio" (intercession) to the Communion, and a "gratiarum actio" (thanksgiving) to the end. Benedict XIV and many others divide the Canon itself into four sets of threefold prayers:

- "Te igitur", "Memento vivorum", "Communicantes";
- "Hanc igitur", "Quam oblationem", "Qui pridie";
- "Unde et memores", "Supra quæ", "Supplices te rogamus";
- "Memento defunctorum", "Nobis quoque", "Per quem hæc omnia".

Fortescue remarked that the medieval explanations are interesting as showing with what reverence people studied the text of the Canon and how, when every one had forgotten the original reasons for its forms, they still kept the conviction that the Mass is full of venerable mysteries and that all its clauses mean more than common expressions. He added that in this conviction the sometimes naive medieval interpreters were eminently right.

== See also ==
- Text and rubrics of the Roman Canon
- History of the Roman Canon
- Mass
- Pre-Tridentine Mass
- Tridentine Mass
- Mass of Paul VI
- Anaphora (liturgy)

== Bibliography ==
- Burbridge, E. (1905), E. G. Cuthbert F. Atchley (ed.), Ordo Romanus Primus, London.
- Gihr, Das heilige Messopfer [The holy mass] (in German).
- Jungmann, Josef, The Mass of the Roman Rite: Its Origins and Development, vol. I.
- Lambertini, Prospero Lorenzo, De SS. Missæ Sacr., vol. Lib. II.
