= Gelasian Sacramentary =

Book of Christian liturgy

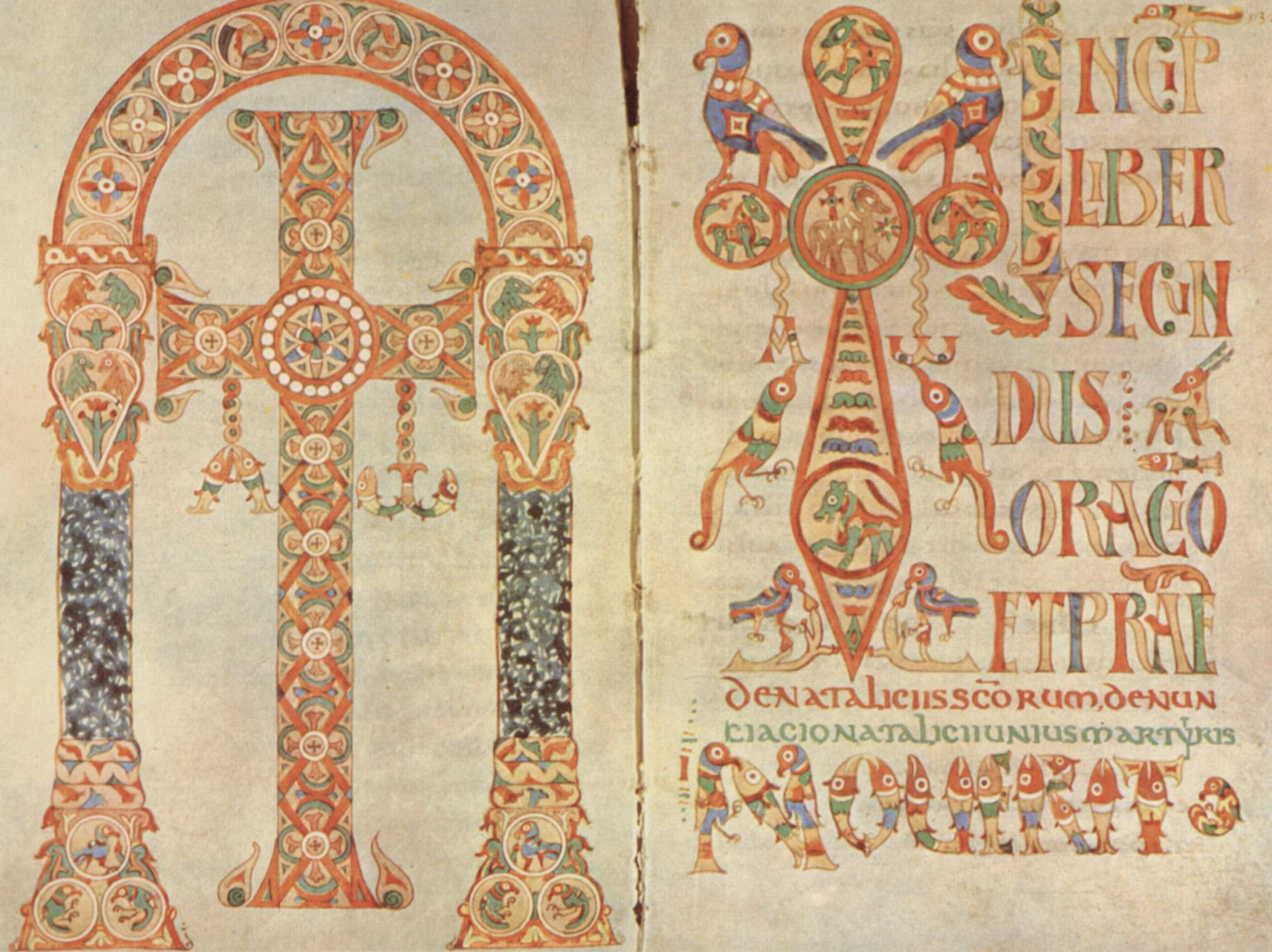
Frontispiece and incipit from the Vatican manuscript

The so-called Gelasian Sacramentary (Latin: Sacramentarium Gelasianum) is a book of Christian liturgy, compiled around 750, containing the priest's part in celebrating the Eucharist. It is the second oldest western liturgical book that has survived: only the Verona Sacramentary is older.

The book exists in several manuscripts, the oldest of which is an 8th-century manuscript in the Vatican Library, acquired from the library of Queen Christina of Sweden (thus MS Reginensis 316); in German scholarship this is referred to as the Altgelasianum, and is considered the sacramentary used by Saint Boniface in his mid-8th century mission on the European continent. This is the most important surviving Merovingian illuminated manuscript, and shows a synthesis of Late Antique conventions with "barbarian" migration period art motifs comparable to the better known insular art of Britain and Ireland.

In none of its old manuscripts does the book bear the name of Gelasius but is simply called Liber sacramentorum Romanae ecclesiae ("Book of Sacraments of the Church of Rome"). However, an old tradition linked the book to Pope Gelasius I, apparently based on Walafrid Strabo's ascription of what is evidently this book to the 5th-century pope. The sacramentary was compiled near Paris around 750, and it contains a mixture of Gallican and Roman elements. The dating of the liturgical contents are not based on characteristics of the surviving manuscript itself (ca 750): most of its liturgy reflects the mix of Roman and Gallican practice inherited from the Merovingian church. In 785-6 the reforms of Pope Gregory I, Gregory the Great, were supplied to Charlemagne by Pope Hadrian I. The spurious ascription to Gelasius gave an added authority to the contents, which are an important document of pre-Gregorian liturgy.

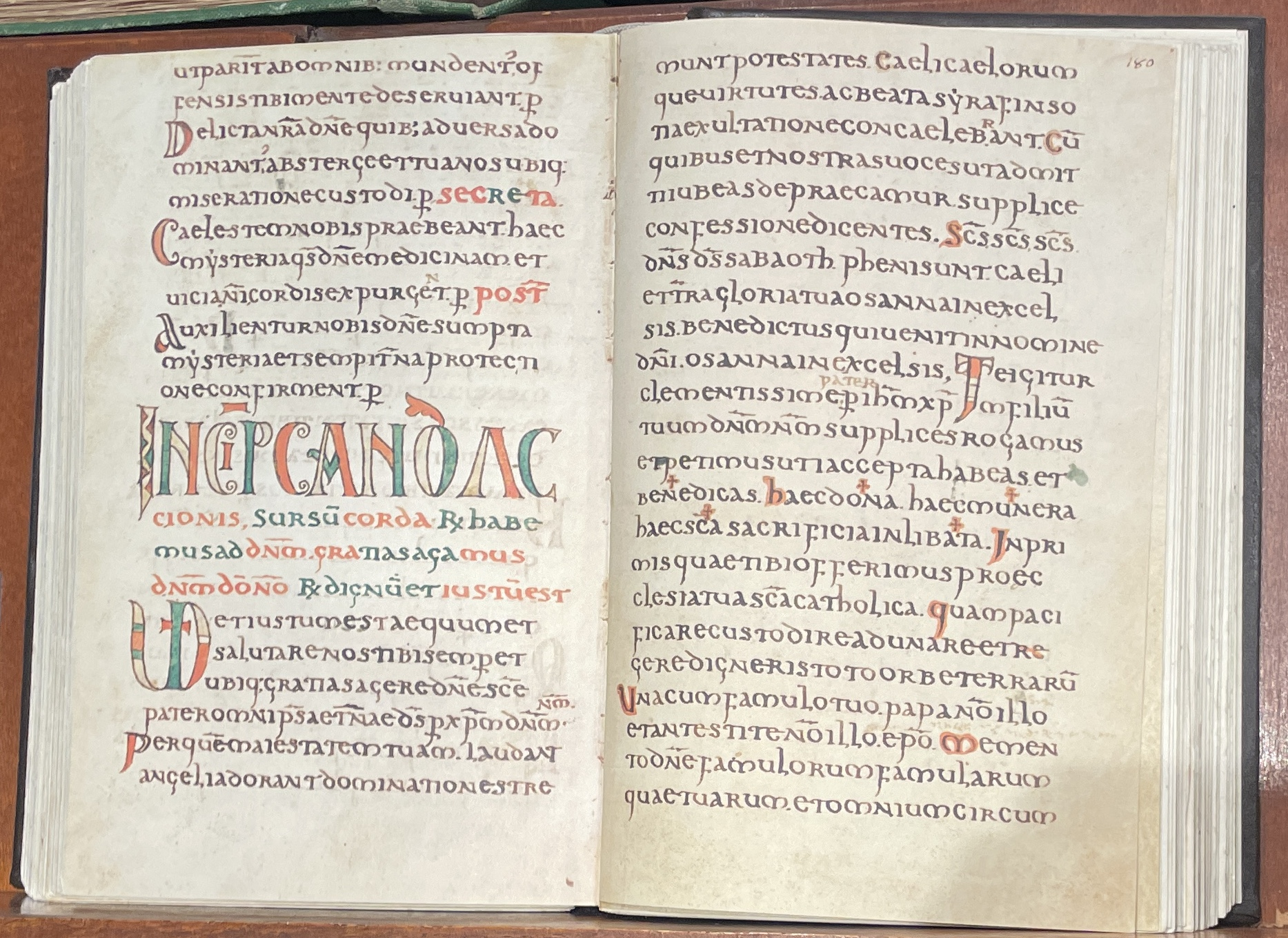
A detail of a facsimile of the Gelasian Sacramentary in the Museum of Catholic Art and History.

Among several distinct rites current in the West before the 8th century, the two most influential were the Roman rite used in Italy south of Lombardy and the Gallican in use in most of the rest of Western Europe, save Iberia and the British Isles. By 700 the influence of the Roman sacramentary had modified Gallican usage. This mixture of rites represented in the Gelasian Sacramentary was superseded when Charlemagne asked Pope Hadrian to provide an authentic Roman sacramentary for use throughout the empire. In 785-86, the pope sent the emperor the Sacramentarium Hadrianum, a version of the Gregorian Sacramentary for papal use, which was adapted for the Carolingian empire.

The "Gelasian Sacramentary" comprises the pre-Gregorian three parts, corresponding to the liturgical year, made up of masses for Sundays and feasts, prayers, rites and blessings of the Easter font and of the oil, prayers at dedication of churches, and for the reception of nuns.
