= Verona Sacramentary =

Roman liturgical book from the seventh century

The Verona Sacramentary (Latin: Sacramentarium Veronense) or Leonine Sacramentary (Sacramentarium Leonianum) is the oldest surviving liturgical book of the Roman Rite. It is not a sacramentary in the strict sense, but rather a private collection of libelli missarum (missal booklets) containing only the prayers for certain Masses and not the scriptures, the canon or the antiphons. It is named after the sole surviving manuscript, Codex Veronensis LXXXV, which was found in the chapter library of the Verona Cathedral by Giuseppe Bianchini and published in his four-volume Anastasii bibliothecarii vitae Romanorum pontificum in 1735. It is sometimes called "Leonine" because it has been attributed to Pope Leo I (died 461), but while some of the prayers may be his compositions the entire work certainly is not.

The Codex Veronensis LXXXV was copied in the early seventh century outside of Rome, but some of its material is clearly derived from Roman pamphlets (libelli missarum) and dates to the fifth and sixth centuries. Its contents are arranged according to the civil calendar, but the three quires containing the period 1 January – 14 April are lost. Thus, there is no information in the earliest Roman liturgical book concerning the Easter Vigil.
