= Ecphonesis =

Exclamatory phrase in poetry, drama, and song

Ecphonesis (Greek: ἐκφώνησις) is an emotional, exclamatory phrase (exclamation) used in poetry, drama, or song. It is a rhetorical device that originated in ancient literature.

== Examples ==
=== Literature ===
A Latin example is "O tempora, o mores", which translates as "Oh, the times! Oh, the morals!".

American writer Edgar Allan Poe used ecphonesis in his short story The Tell-Tale Heart:

Almighty God!—no, no! They heard!—they suspected!—they knew!—they were making a mockery of my horror! This I thought, and this I think. But anything was better than this agony! Anything was more tolerable than this derision! I could bear those hypocritical smiles no longer! I felt that I must scream or die! and now—again!—hark! louder! louder! louder! louder! Villains!” I shrieked, “dissemble no more! I admit the deed!—tear up the planks! Here, here!—It is the beating of his hideous heart!

=== Music ===
In the song Y.M.C.A. by the Village People, lead vocalist Victor Willis says "Young man!"

=== Television ===
Other examples of ecphonesis include when Homer Simpson said "No! No-no-no-no-no-no! Well, yes" during The Simpsons episode "Homer the Heretic", and when the Scarecrow said "Oh joy! Rapture! I got a brain!" in The Wizard of Oz.

=== Politics ===
Donald Trump used the expressions "Sad!" and "Wrong!" without elaboration throughout his 2016 US presidential campaign.

== In Eastern Orthodox Liturgy ==
In the Eastern Orthodox Church many prayers are recited silently by the priest who "speaks to God face-to-face" according to St. Symeon of Thessaloniki. However, the closing words of such prayers are usually chanted aloud, especially at the closing of an ectenia (litany), and those closing words are called an ecphonesis.

Examples:

- In the anaphora (eucharistic prayer), the prayer following the sanctus is said silently by the priest but its ending, the Words of Institution, are intoned in a loud voice.
- During most ectenias the priest silently recites a prayer up to its last line and then, when the ectenia has concluded, he chants aloud that last line.
