= Collect =

Type of prayer

The collect (/ˈkɒlɛkt/ KOL-ekt) is a short general prayer of a particular structure used in Christian liturgy.

Collects come up in the liturgies of Catholic, Lutheran, or Anglican churches, among others.

== Etymology ==
The word is first seen as Latin collēcta, the term used in Rome in the 5th century and the 10th, although in the Tridentine version of the Roman Missal the more generic term oratio (prayer) was used instead.

The Latin word collēcta meant the gathering of people together (from colligō, "to gather") and may have been applied to this prayer as said before the procession to the church in which Mass was celebrated. It may also have been used to mean a prayer that collected into one the prayers of the individual members of the congregation.

== Structure ==
A collect generally has five parts:

- Invocation or address: indicating the person of Trinity addressed, usually God the Father, rarely God the Son
- Acknowledgement: description of a divine attribute that relates to the petition (often qui ... - who ... )
- Petition: "for one thing only and that in the tersest language"
- Aspiration:
  - The desired result (begins with the word ut - in order that)
  - Indication of a further purpose of the petition
- Pleading:
  - Conclusion indicating the mediation of Jesus Christ.
  - Response by the people: Amen

In some contemporary liturgical texts, this structure has been obscured by sentence constructions that depart from the straightforwardness of a single sentence.

== Variations ==
=== Roman Catholicism ===
Initially, only one collect was said at Mass, but the Tridentine version of the Roman Missal allowed and often prescribed the use of more than one collect, all but the first being recited under a single conclusion. This custom, which began north of the Alps, had reached Rome by about the 12th century.

In the 1973 translation of the Roman Missal by the ICEL, the word collecta was rendered as "Opening Prayer". This was a misnomer, since the collect ends—rather than opens—the introductory rites of the Mass. This prayer is said immediately before the Epistle.

=== Lutheranism ===
Lutheran liturgies typically retain traditional collects for each Sunday of the liturgical year. In the Evangelical Lutheran Worship hymnal of the ELCA, however, the set of prayers has been expanded to incorporate different Sunday collects for each year of the lectionary cycle, so that the prayers more closely coordinate with the lectionary scripture readings for the day. To achieve this expansion from one year's worth of Sunday collects to three years', modern prayer texts have been added.

=== Anglicanism ===
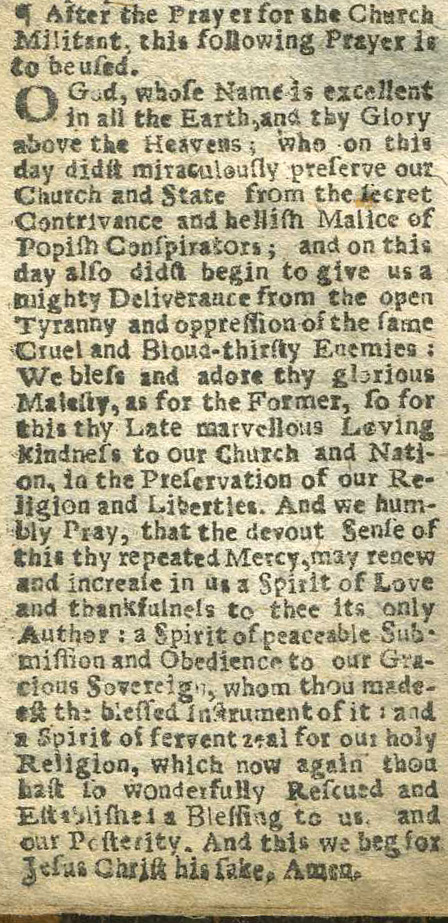
1689 Book of Common Prayer with a special collect for November 5, noting the Gunpowder Plot of 1605

The collects in the Book of Common Prayer are mainly translations by Thomas Cranmer (d. 1556) from the Latin prayers for each Sunday of the year. At Morning Prayer, the Collect of the Day is followed by a Collect for Peace and a Collect for Grace. At Evening Prayer the Collect of the Day is followed by a Collect for Peace which differs from the version used at Morning Prayer, and a Collect for Aid against Perils, which starts with the well known phrase; "Lighten our darkness, we beseech thee, O Lord; and by thy great mercy defend us from all perils and dangers of this night ...".

At Holy Communion, the Collect of the Day is followed by a reading from the Epistles. In more modern Anglican versions of the Communion service, such as Common Worship used in the Church of England or the 1979 Book of Common Prayer used in the Episcopal Church in the United States, the Collect of the Day follows the Gloria and precedes readings from the Bible.

=== Continental Reformed ===
The Huguenots used collects derived from the Psalms and published in the Psalter in 1563.

=== Scottish Presbyterianism ===
The "Oraisons" of the French Psalter were translated by and published in the Scottish Metrical Psalter in 1595. Over time the use of written prayers fell out of favor in the Church of Scotland.

== See also ==
- Secret (liturgy)
- Kontakion
- Stir-up Sunday
