= Aginha of Arga =

Portuguese Saint

Saint Aginha of Arga
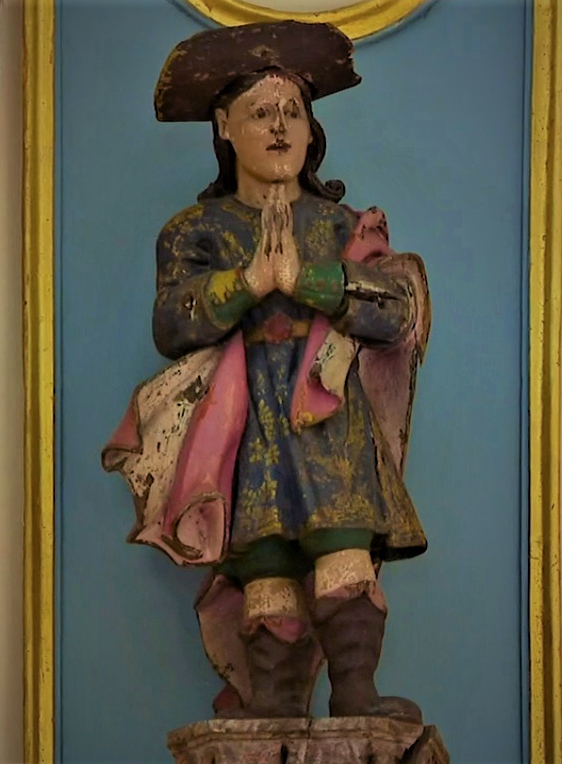
- Image of Saint Aginha in the parish church of Arga de São João, in Caminha

Martyr of Charity
- Died: Arga de São João, Caminha
- Major shrine: Parish Church of Arga de São João, Caminha
- Feast: 10 November

Aginha of Arga (Portuguese: Santo Aginha or Óginha) was a probably legendary figure that is venerated as a Christian saint in Caminha, Portugal. Before his conversion to Christianity, Aginha had been a violent robber and murderer who preyed on pedestrians in the Arga Mountains.

The liturgical feast of Saint Aginha was part of the Sanctorale of the Rite of Braga until its removal in the 20th century; he was never included in the General Roman Calendar for universal use.

== Life ==
According to legend, Aginha (whose name is a popular corruption of the Portuguese archaism asinha, a term meaning "rapidly", in reference to his swift conversion to Christianity) was a notorious murderous robber that preyed on travellers on the paths of the Arga Mountains.

His conversion came about when he attempted to rob a lone monk. When Aginha demanded he hand him his purse, the monk told him he had nothing to give him since he had professed vows of poverty. When Aginha unsheathed his sword and threatened to kill him, the monk fell on his knees and implored him to change his criminal ways, urging him to repent so he could hope to achieve Salvation. Aginha replied that his own malice made him beyond the mercy of God, but the monk assured him that no offence, however serious, was greater than God's forgiveness for those who turned away from sin. Touched by the monk's words, the robber started crying copious tears that washed away all the innocent blood he had shed on the mountains — he asked the monk to hear his General Confession and accepted his penance: to protect travellers on the mountain and help them if they were in distress.

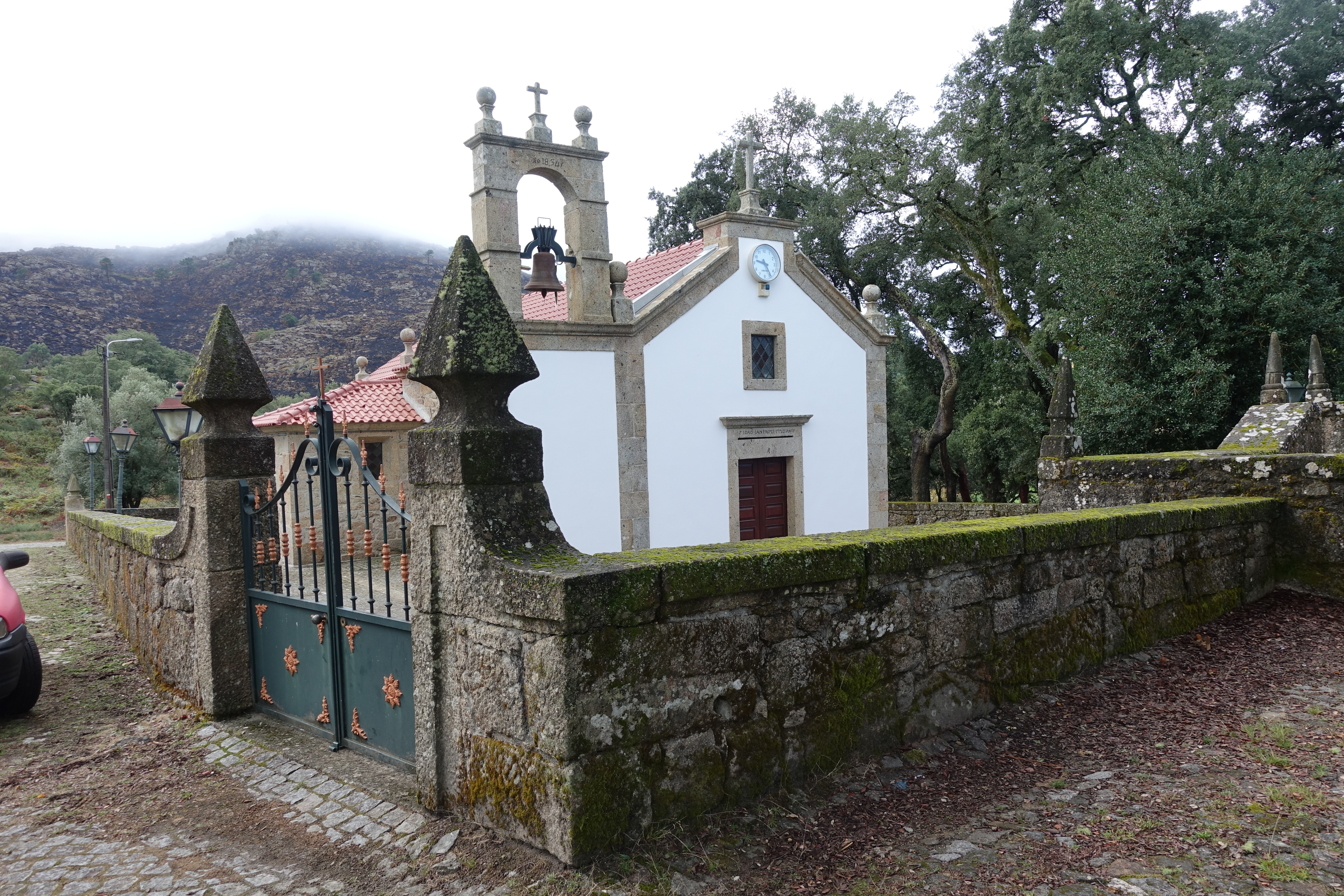
The parish church of Arga de São João, in Caminha

He soon after found a peasant whose cart had overturned. As Aginha approached the man to help him on his way, he was recognised as a dangerous robber; the man, who was unaware of Aginha's repentance, struck him on the head with his hoe, killing him, and concealed the body in the scrub. Some time after, as the peasant learned that there was a bounty on Aginha's head, he immediately attempted to claim the reward, returning with a crowd of people to the place where he had hidden the body: it was found to be incorrupt and exuding the odour of sanctity.
