= Sub tuum præsidium =

Christian hymn and prayer

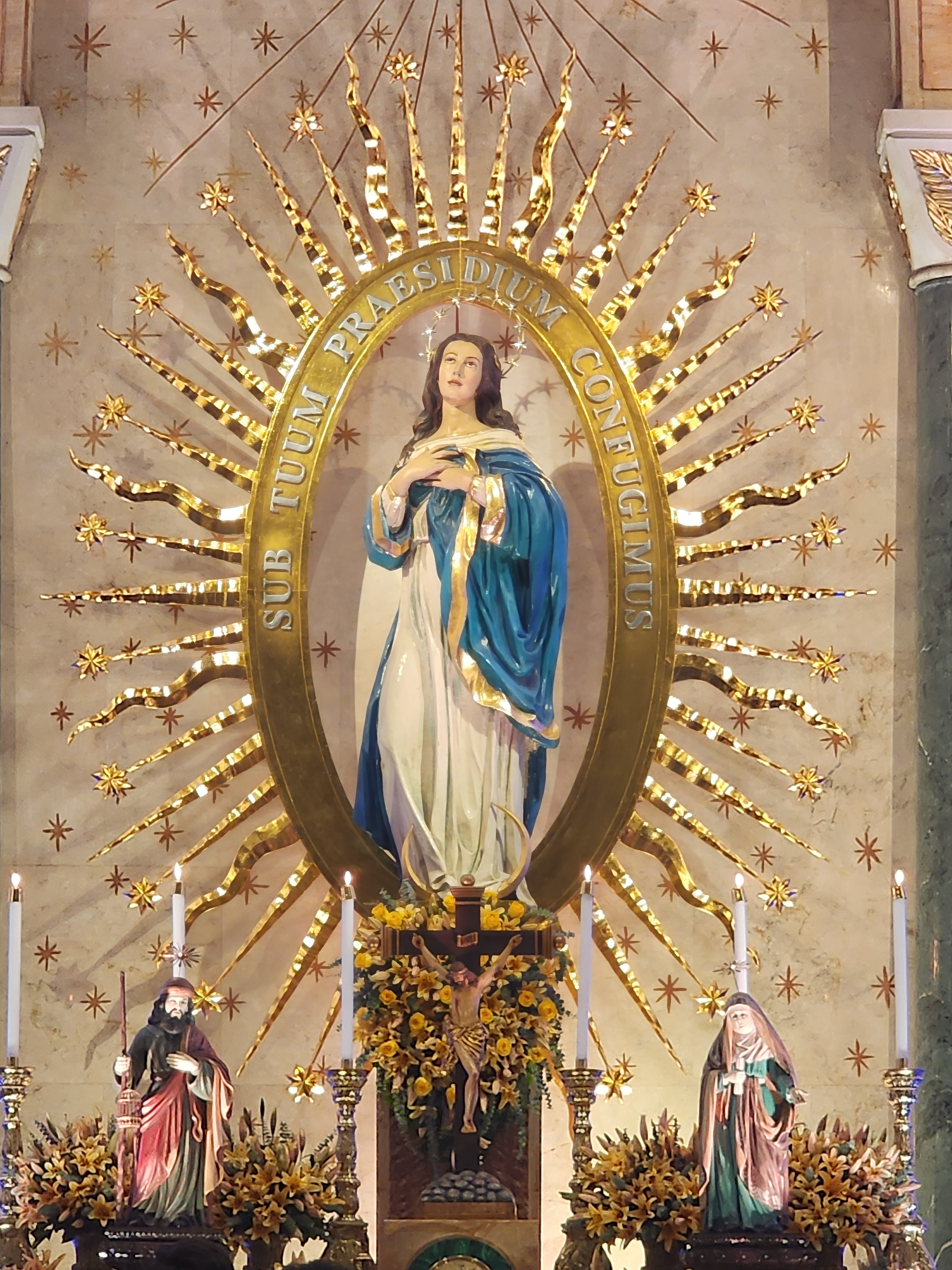
The altar image of the Immaculate Conception in Manila Cathedral by the Roman sculptor Vincenzo Assenza, adorned with a festal mandorla containing the first four Latin words of the hymn

Sub tuum præsidium (Ancient Greek: Ὑπὸ τὴν σὴν εὐσπλαγχνίαν; lit. 'under your protection') is an ancient Christian hymn and prayer dedicated to the Blessed Virgin Mary. Parts of the prayer have been dated to the 3rd or 4th century. The hymn is well attested within the Catholic Church, the Anglican Communion, the Eastern Orthodox Church and Oriental Orthodox Churches.

== Historicity ==
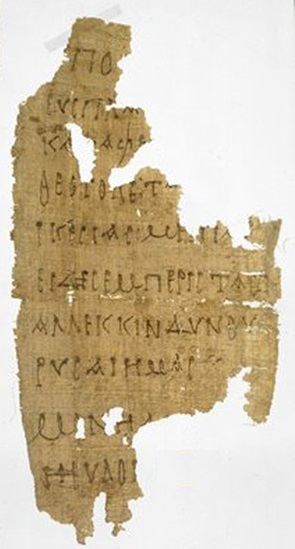
The Papyrus No. 470, currently the earliest surviving manuscript in the Greek language, dated between 3rd to 9th centuries. Preserved today at the John Rylands library in Manchester, England

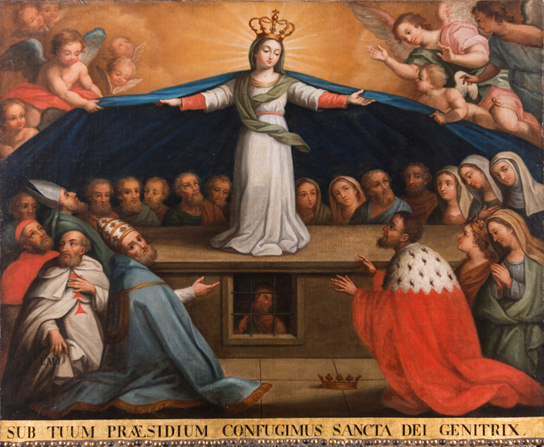
A processional banner from the Holy House of Mercy in Lisbon (1784) depicting the Virgin of Mercy

The earliest text of this hymn was found in a Coptic Orthodox Christmas liturgy. Rylands Papyrus 470 records the hymn in Greek, and was dated to the 3rd century by papyrologist Edgar Lobel and by scholar Colin Henderson Roberts to the 4th century. By contrast, Hans Förster dates it to the 8th century and states that Roberts quoted Lobel, and that there is no consensus supporting the Lobel date.

Although he notes that a number of scholars support Lobel and Roberts, Towarek follows Förster and others in concluding that the earliest textual witness to the hymn is of 6th-7th century provenance and that it became liturgically prevalent in the Middle Ages. Recent scholarship has identified the hymn in the Georgian Orthodox Iadgari (Chantbook) of Jerusalem, demonstrating that the Sub tuum praesidium was in liturgical use during the 5th century. Besides the Greek text, ancient versions can be found in Coptic, Syriac, Armenian and Latin.

The former medieval and post-medieval practice in several dioceses, especially in France, was to use the Sub tuum as the final antiphon at Compline instead of the Salve Regina, and in the Rite of Braga, where it is sung at the end of the Catholic Mass.

== Pontifical indulgence ==
Pope Pius VI in the decree of 5 April 1786 granted the indulgence of one hundred days and, on Sundays, of seven years and the same number of forty years to anyone who with sincere contrition recited in the morning the antiphon Salve Regina and in the evening the Sub tuum praesidium. The Enchiridion Indulgentiarum of 2004 provides for partial indulgence.

== Liturgical use ==
In the Byzantine Rite used by the Eastern Orthodox and Eastern Catholic Churches, the hymn is the last apolytikion of Vespers celebrated during Great Lent on Sunday evenings and weekdays. It is also the last apolytikion of Vespers on other Days of Alleluia outside of Great Lent. In Greek practice, it is usually sung in Neo-Byzantine chant.

In the Armenian Rite, the hymn is sung on the Eve of Theophany and is also used as an acclamation (Armenian: մաղթանք) in the daily compline service known as the Rest Hour (Հանգստեան Ժամ). A slightly different version of the hymn is appended to the Trisagion when the latter is chanted in the daily Morning (Առաւօտեան) and Evening (Երեկոյեան) Hours of the Daily Office. The hymn is also used in the Coptic, Byzantine, and Ambrosian liturgies.

In the Roman Rite it is used as the antiphon for the Nunc Dimittis at Compline in the Little Office of the Blessed Virgin Mary, and in the Liturgy of the Hours may be used as the Marian antiphon after Compline or Vespers outside of Eastertide.

Since 2018, Pope Francis has asked to pray this hymn along with the Rosary and the Prayer to Saint Michael asking for the unity of the Church during October (2018). In the official communiqué he added that "Russian mystics and the great saints of all the traditions advised, in moments of spiritual turbulence, to shelter beneath the mantle of the Holy Mother of God pronouncing the invocation 'Sub Tuum Praesidium'".

== Musical settings ==
The Latin version has been set to music in the West many times, notably by Marc-Antoine Charpentier, Jan Dismas Zelenka, Antonio Salieri, Wolfgang Amadeus Mozart and Ludwig van Beethoven.

The Arabic version, also, is well known in the Levant, Iraq, and Egypt. It is sung as "fi dhilli himayatiki".

== Authenticated Recensions ==
=== Greek ===
Greek Text	English Translation
Ὑπὸ τὴν σὴν εὐσπλαγχνίαν, καταφεύγομεν, Θεοτόκε. Τὰς ἡμῶν ἱκεσίας, μὴ παρίδῃς ἐν περιστάσει, ἀλλ᾽ ἐκ κινδύνων λύτρωσαι ἡμᾶς, μόνη Ἁγνή, μόνη εὐλογημένη.	Beneath thy compassion, We take refuge, O Theotokos [God-bearer]: do not despise our petitions in time of trouble: but rescue us from dangers, only pure one, only blessed one.

=== Slavonic ===
The earliest Church Slavonic manuscripts have the prayer in the following form:

Church Slavonic	English Translation
Подъ твою милость, прибѣгаемъ богородице дѣво, молитвъ нашихъ не презри в скорбѣхъ. но ѿ бѣдъ избави насъ, едина чистаѧ и благословеннаѧ.	Beneath thy mercy, we take refuge, O Virgin Theotokos: disdain not our supplications in our distress, but deliver us from perils, O only pure and blessed one.

This version continues to be used by the Old Believers today, as well as those churches (Eastern Orthodox and Eastern Catholic alike) which use the Ruthenian Recension.

Alternative Church Slavonic Version	English Translation
Подъ твое благотробїе прибѣгаемъ Богородице, моленїѧ наша не презри во ωбстоѧнїй, но ѿ бѣдъ исбави ны, едина Чистаѧ, и Благословеннаѧ	Beneath thy tenderness of heart we take refuge, O Theotokos, disdain not our supplications in our necessity, but deliver us from perils, O only pure and blessed one.

This alternative version continues in use today.

=== Latin ===
The Latin translation, likely derived from the Greek, dates from the 11th century:

Latin Text	English Translation
Sub tuum præsidium confugimus, Sancta Dei Genetrix. Nostras deprecationes ne despicias in necessitatibus, sed a periculis cunctis libera nos semper, Virgo gloriosa et benedicta	We fly to thy protection, O Holy Mother of God; Do not despise our petitions in our necessities, but deliver us always from all dangers, O Glorious and Blessed Virgin.

Some of the Latin versions have also incorporated the following verses often attributed to Saint Bernard of Clairvaux to the above translation:

Domina nostra, Mediatrix nostra, Advocata nostra ("Our Lady, our Mediatrix, Our Advocate")

tuo Filio nos reconcilia ("Reconcile us to your Son")

tuo Filio nos recommenda ("Recommend us to your Son")

tuo Filio nos representa ("Represent us to your Son")
