= Rite of Braga =

Catholic liturgical rite used by the Archdiocese of Braga in Portugal

The Rite of Braga (or Bragan Rite; Portuguese: rito bracarense) is a Catholic liturgical rite associated with the Archdiocese of Braga in Portugal.

== History ==
The historical Rite of Braga belonged to the Roman family of liturgical rites with some Gallican influence. It took shape within the Archdiocese of Braga between the 11th and 13th centuries. The Missal of Mateus, which dates to the second quarter of the twelfth century, is the oldest known source for this Rite. Pope Pius V's papal bulls Quod a nobis of 9 July 1568 and Quo primum of 14 July 1570 imposed as a general rule the Roman Rite throughout the Latin Church, but exempted other Latin rites which had been in use for at least two centuries. Since the rite or "use" of Braga was more than 200 years old at the time of these bulls, it was not affected by them. However, subsequently the Roman Rite was increasingly adopted within the archdiocese and non-traditional elements were admitted into celebrations of the archdiocese's rite.

In the 20th century an attempt was made by Archbishop Manuel Vieira de Matos, with the approval of Pope Pius XI, to expunge the accretions, to revise the texts and to make the rite obligatory within the archdiocese. A missal was published in 1924. However, the Rite of Braga has rarely been used since the Second Vatican Council.

In 2018, the Pontifical Commission Ecclesia Dei (PCED) considers it a local Use of the Roman Rite, rather than an independent rite.

== Rite ==
The Use of Braga contains many of the classically medieval features of the liturgy, which will be familiar to those who use the Dominican, Premonstratensian or Old Carmelite liturgical books, or those who have studied the Uses of Sarum, Paris etc., but also many features unique to itself.

A peculiarity of the Rite of Braga was the recitation of the Ave Maria at the start of Mass and of the Sub tuum praesidium at the end.

In a talk on 24 October 1998, Joseph Cardinal Ratzinger (later Pope Benedict XVI) cited the Rite of Braga as one of the liturgical rites whose variety within the Latin Church demonstrated that unity does not require liturgical uniformity.
