= Genny Beemyn =

- Born: 1966 (age 59–60)
- Education: University of Rochester (MS) University of Iowa (MA '91, MA '93, PhD) Cornell University (BA)
- Occupations: Activist, educator, college administrator, author, public speaker, psychologist
- Employer: University of Massachusetts, Amherst Stonewall Center
- Known for: Trans and LGBTQ+ Education and Advocacy
- Notable work: A Queer Capital: A History of Gay Life in Washington, D.C. (2014); The Lives of Transgender People (2011)
- Website: https://www.gennyb.com

Genny Beemyn (born 1966) is an American transgender and LGBTQ+ activist, educator, researcher, and author. Beemyn has written more than 10 books in trans and queer studies.

One of the first non-binary college administrators in the United States, Beemyn has been the director of the University of Massachusetts Amherst Stonewall Center, an on-campus LGBTQ+ resource center, since 2006. Beemyn is also the coordinator of Campus Pride Trans Policy Clearinghouse and co-chair of International Pronouns Day.

== Biography ==
Beemyn came out as trans and genderqueer in the mid-to-late 1990s. They cite Stone Butch Blues (1993) by Leslie Feinberg as a "revelatory moment" for them as they related to the gender non-conforming main character.

== Education ==
Beemyn graduated with a Bachelor of Arts in Africana Studies and Political Science from Cornell University in 1989. They then completed two Masters at the University of Iowa, in African American Studies in 1991 and American studies in 1993. They completed their PhD in the same two subjects at the University of Iowa in 1997.

In 2001, Beemyn graduated with a Masters in Higher Education Administration from the University of Rochester.

== Career ==
Beemyn began their career in the early 1990s as an instructor in African American Studies and English at the University of Iowa. In 1997 they became an assistant professor in African American Studies at Western Illinois University.

Beemyn collected oral histories from LGBTQ+ individuals living in Washington, D.C. from July 14, 1997, to December 21, 2000. These histories would be used later in Beemyn's 2014 A Queer Capital: A History of Gay Life in Washington D.C.

From 2001 to 2006, Beemyn worked as the GLBT Student Services Coordinator at Ohio State University.

Since 2004, Beemyn has conducted research on and tracked trans-inclusive university policies across the US. Two years later, Beemyn began working as the director of the Stonewall Center at the University of Massachusetts Amherst, the third-oldest campus LGBTQ+ resource center in the US.

Beemyn and Sue Rankin published one of the first empirical surveys of the trans community in The Lives of Transgender People in November 2011. In the forward to the book, Shannon Minter writes: "Through surveys and interviews with a huge sampling of transgender people from across the country, [The Lives of Transgender People] is the first major study to combine methodological rigor with an insider’s grasp of the nuances and complexities of transgender lives." Beemyn and Rankin found that 257 of their survey participants did not identify with the gender identities of 'male,' 'female,' or 'trans' – with some preferring terms like "'fluid,' 'neutral,' 'queer,' [and] 'two-spirit,'" while were uncertain or found no suitable word yet existed.

In 2021 and 2022, Beemyn taught the course 'LGBTQ+ People in Higher Education' at the University of Michigan.

Beemyn is on the editorial board of three academic journals: International Journal of LGBTQ+ Youth Studies; Journal of Bisexuality; and Journal of Homosexuality.

== Selected publications ==
=== Books ===
- Beemyn, Genny; Eliason, Michele, eds. (1996). Queer studies: A lesbian, gay, bisexual, and transgender anthology. New York University Press. ISBN 978-0814712573.
- Beemyn, Genny, ed. (1997). Creating a Place For Ourselves: Lesbian, Gay, and Bisexual Community Histories. Contributions by Genny Beemyn, Nan Alamilla Boyd, George Chauncey, Madeline Davis, Allen Drexel, John Howard, David Johnson, Liz Kennedy, Joan Nestle, Esther Newton, Tim Retzloff, Marc Stein, and Roey Thorpe. Routledge. ISBN 978-1135222406.
- Beemyn, Genny; Steinman, E., eds. (2001). Bisexuality in the lives of men: Facts and fictions. Routledge.
- Beemyn, Genny; Steinman, Erich, eds. (2002). Bisexual Men in Culture and Society. Routledge. ISBN 978-1317992752.
- Beemyn, Genny (2002). "The development and administration of campus LGBT centers and offices". In Sanlo, R.; Rankin, Susan; Schoenberg, R. (eds.). Our place on campus: Lesbian, gay, bisexual, transgender services and programs in higher education. Greenwood Press. pp. 25–32.
- Beemyn, Genny; Rankin, Susan (November 2011). The Lives of Transgender People (PDF). Introduction by Shannon Minter. Columbia University Press. pp. 1–248. ISBN 9780231143073.
- Beemyn, Genny (June 20, 2014). A queer capital: A history of gay life in Washington, D.C. Routledge. ISBN 978-1317819370.
- Beemyn, Genny; Maurer, L (2016). The LGBTQIA+ supportive campus: Providing programs and services for LGBTQIA+ students. PaperClip Communications.
- Beemyn, Geeny, ed. (February 2019). Trans people in higher education. SUNY Press. pp. 1–342. ISBN 9781438472737.
- Beemyn, Geeny; Goldberg, Abbie E., eds. (2021). The SAGE encyclopedia of trans studies. Sage Publishing.
- Goldberg, Abbie E.; Beemyn, Genny, eds. (January 23, 2024). The SAGE encyclopedia of LGBTQ+ studies (2nd ed.). Sage Publishing. pp. 1–1664. ISBN 978-1071891421.
- Beemyn, Genny; Eliason, M. (eds.). Campus queer: Addressing the needs of LGBTQA+ college students. Johns Hopkins University Press.

=== Book chapters ===
- Beemyn, Genny (1997). "A queer capital: Lesbian, gay, and bisexual experiences in Washington, D.C. during and after World War II.". In Beemyn, Genny (ed.). Creating a place for ourselves: Lesbian, gay, and bisexual community histories. Routledge. pp. 183–209. ISBN 978-1135222406.
- Beemyn, Genny (2001). "The New Negro Renaissance, a bisexual renaissance: The lives and works of Angelina Weld Grimké and Richard Bruce Nugent". In Black, Allida (ed.). Modern American queer history. Temple University Press. pp. 36–48. ISBN 978-1566398718.
- Beemyn, Genny (2002). ""To say yes to life": Sexual and gender fluidity in James Baldwin's Giovanni's Room and Another Country.". In Beemyn, Genny; Steinman, Erich (eds.). Bisexual men in culture and society. Harrington Park Press. pp. 55–72. ISBN 978-1317992752.
- Beemyn, Genny (2005). "Serving the needs of transgender college students". In Sears, James (ed.). Gay, Lesbian, and Transgender Issues in Education: Programs, Policies, and Practices. Haworth Press. pp. 105–123. ISBN 978-1136614163.
- Beemyn, Genny (2006). "The Americas: From colonial times to the 20th century.". In Aldrich, Robert (ed.). Gay Life & Culture: A World History. Thames and Hudson. pp. 145–165.
- Beemyn, Genny (2006). "Ten strategies to improve trans inclusiveness on campus". In Windmeyer, Shane (ed.). The Advocate College Guide for LGBT Students. Alyson. pp. 375–377.
- Beemyn, Genny (2014). "Transforming the curriculum: The inclusion of the experiences of trans people.". In Rupp, Leila; Freeman, Susan (eds.). Understanding and teaching U.S. lesbian, gay, bisexual, and transgender history. University of Wisconsin Press. pp. 111–122. ISBN 978-0299302443.
- Beemyn, Genny (2014). "Transgender history". In Erickson-Schroth, Laura (ed.). Trans bodies, trans selves: A resource for the transgender community. Oxford University Press. pp. 501–536. ISBN 978-0190092726.
- Beemyn, Genny; Rankin, Susan (March 22, 2016). "Creating a gender-inclusive campus". In Martínez-San Miguel, Yolanda; Tobias, Sarah (eds.). Trans studies: Beyond hetero/homo normativity (PDF). Contributions by Sarah Tobias, Yolanda Martinez-San Miguel, Genny Beemyn, Susan Rankin, Pauline Park, Lucas Crawford, Valens Keja, Jian Chen, Toby Beauchamp, Nora Butler Burke, Aren Z. Aizura, Mickael Chacha Enriquez, Alexandra Rodriguez de Ruiz, Marcia Ochoa, Jody L. Herman, Sel J. Hwahng, and A. Finn Enke. Rutgers University Press. pp. 21–32. ISBN 978-0813576404. JSTOR j.ctt19z38xf.
- Beemyn, Genny; Eliason, Mickey; Elia, John P. (March 7, 2018). "Mapping bisexual studies: Past and present, and implications for the future.". In Swan, D. Joye; Habibi, Shani (eds.). Bisexuality: Theories, research, and recommendations for the invisible sexuality. Contributions by Genny Beemyn, Christina Dyar, John P. Elia, Mickey Eliason, Breanne Fahs, Brian A. Feinstein, Corey E. Flanders, M. Paz Galupo, Shani Habibi, Tania Israel, Kimberly M. Koerth, Kirsten McLean, Emily E. Prior, Florence Stueck, and D. Joye Swan. (1st ed.). Springer Publishing. pp. 1–18. ISBN 978-3319715353.
- Beemyn, Genny (2019). "Being genderqueer before it was a thing" (PDF). In Rajunov, Micah; Duane, Scott (eds.). Nonbinary: Memoirs of gender and identity. Columbia University Press. pp. 41–47. ISBN 9780231185332.
- Beemyn, Genny (February 1, 2019). "Get over the binary: The experiences of nonbinary trans college students". In Beemyn, Genny (ed.). Trans people in higher education. SUNY Press. pp. 159–183. ISBN 978-1438472751.
- Beeyn, Genny; Goldberg, Abbie E. (August 2, 2021). ""To be your best self": Surviving and thriving as a trans grad student." (PDF). In Shanok, Arielle; Elden, Nicole Benedicto (eds.). Thriving in graduate school: The expert's guide to success and wellness (1st ed.). Rowman & Littlefield Publishing. pp. 215–233. ISBN 978-1538133309.
- Beemyn, Genny (2021). "Trans students" (PDF). In Weaver-Hightower, Marcus B.; Niemi, Nancy S. (eds.). The Wiley Handbook of Gender Equity in Higher Education. Wiley Blackwell. pp. 197–214. doi:10.1002/9781119257639. ISBN 978-1-119-25758-5.
- Beemyn, Genny (May 2, 2023). "Genny Beemyn". In Gillespie, Peggy (ed.). Authentic selves: Celebrating trans and nonbinary people and their families. Forwards by Jazz Jennings and Jeanette Jennings. Skinner House Books. pp. 316–320. ISBN 978-1558968967.
- Beemyn, Genny (January 19, 2024). "How trans and nonbinary students are changing the nature of gender in the 21st century". In Prieto, Kaity; Herridge, Andrew (eds.). Perspectives on Transforming Higher Education and the LGBTQIA Student Experience. IGI Global. pp. 46–67. ISBN 978-1668499146.
- Beemyn, Genny. "Yes, 'they' can be used for one person": Coming out as nonbinary to cis family members". In Goldberg, Abbie E.; Allen, Katherine (eds.). Opening family secrets: Stigma, shame, stress, and strength. Cognella.

== Awards ==
| Year | Awarding Body | Award | Result | Reference |
|---|---|---|---|---|
| 1995 | American Historical Association | Albert J. Beveridge Research Award in Western Hemisphere History | Won | |
| 2002 | University of Rochester Margaret Warner Graduate School of Education | Walter I. Garms Award for Educational Leadership | Won | |
| 2006 | National Association of Student Personnel Administrators | GLBT Issues Knowledge Community – Service to Student Affairs Award | Won | |
| 2015 | Consortium of Higher Education LGBT Resource Professionals | Research and Assessment Award | Won | |
| 2016 | UMass | Roy J. Zuckerberg Endowed Leadership Prize | Nominated | |
| 2019 | Trans Visibility March | Lou Sullivan Torch Award | Won | |
| 2019 | Forward Reviews | Foreword INDIES Book of the Year Award – LGBTQ Category | Honorable Mention | |
| 2022 | American Psychological Association’s Society for the Psychology of Sexual Orientation and Gender Diversity | Distinguished Book Award | Won | |
