= Henry Bradshaw Society =

British publisher of historic liturgical books

- Founded: 1890
- Country of origin: United Kingdom
- Headquarters location: London
- Distribution: Boydell & Brewer
- Publication types: Books
- Nonfiction topics: rare liturgical texts
- Official website: henrybradshawsociety.org

The Henry Bradshaw Society is a British-based text publication society founded in 1890 for the scholarly editing and publication of rare liturgical texts.

== Foundation ==
An initial meeting to plan the Henry Bradshaw Society took place in London on 3 July 1890, after which provisional subscriptions were solicited. The general meeting to inaugurate the Society took place on 25 November 1890 in the Jerusalem Chamber at Westminster Abbey. A committee was finalised and a programme of publications worked out.

One of the models for the society was the Durham-based Surtees Society, formed in 1834, which in turn received assistance from officers of the Bannatyne Club. The foundation of the new society was also linked, more by overlapping interests than organizational models, to the body then known as the St Paul's Ecclesiological Society. John Wickham Legg, who had played a significant role in the re-establishment of that society in 1879 after a decade or so of limbo, also became an important founding member of the Henry Bradshaw Society.

The Society was named after Henry Bradshaw (1831–1886), Librarian of the Cambridge University Library, who had been interested in early printing and in bibliographic description. This latter passion led to his becoming familiar with many European libraries, where he also became aware of holdings of early English liturgical manuscripts.

The promised subscribers including many Anglican bishops and other dignitaries, but also Léopold Delisle of the Bibliothèque nationale, Paris, Antonio Maria Ceriani of the Ambrosian Library, Milan and others Catholics such as W.H. James Weale, Edmund Bishop, Dom Aidan Gasquet, the abbé Louis Duchesne, and Dom Hildebrand de Hemptinne, abbot of Maredsous. The first volumes were to be printed in 500 copies and at the next meeting the Council fixed the individual subscription rate as 12 guineas (£12 12s).

== Editions ==
By the end of the 19th century some 19 volumes had been issued, three of which contained an edition of the Westminster Missal, given to the abbey by Abbot Nicholas Lytlington, abbot 1362–1386, and builder of the Jerusalem Chamber, where the Society was publicly launched.

Other early editions were of the coronation rites of King Charles I (1892), the Martiloge in Englysshe (1893), the Antiphonary of Bangor (1893–96; from the Ambrosian Library), the Tracts of Clement Maydeston (1894), the Winchester Troper, the Martyrology of Gorman (1895; from the Royal Library, Brussels), the Missal of Robert of Jumièges (1896; from Rouen public library), the Irish Liber Hymnorum (1898; from Trinity College Library, Dublin), the Rosslyn Missal (1899; from the Advocates Library, Edinburgh), the Coronation Book of Charles V of France (1899; British Library, Cotton Tiberius MS B.VIII), the Missale Romanum, printed in Milan in 1474 (1899–1907) and the fifteenth-century Processional of the Nuns of Chester (1899).

Although the Society fell into something of a slump after the Second World War, it was revived with some vigour in the 1980s. The latest volume to be published, in 2019, is numbered 124.

== Current officers ==
The Society's principal honorary officers currently include:

- President: Professor Henry Mayr-Harting
- Chairman of Council: Professor Susan Rankin

== Bibliography ==
- Johnson, Cuthbert; Ward, Anthony (1987). "Some British Societies for the Publication of Studies and Ancient Texts". Ephemerides Liturgicae. 101: 229–245.
- Ward, Anthony (1992). The Publications of the Henry Bradshaw Society: an annotated bibliography with indexes. Bibliotheca Ephemerides Liturgicae: Subsidia. Vol. 67. Rome: CLV-Edizioni Liturgiche. ISBN 8885918697.
- Ward, Anthony (2001). "The Publications of the Henry Bradshaw Society: the Decade 1991-2000". Ephemerides Liturgicae. 115: 82–94.
- Ward, Anthony; Johnson, Cuthbert (1990). "The Henry Bradshaw Society: its birth and first decade, 1890-1900". Ephemerides Liturgicae. 104: 187–200.
