= Bobbio Missal =

7th-century Christian liturgical codex

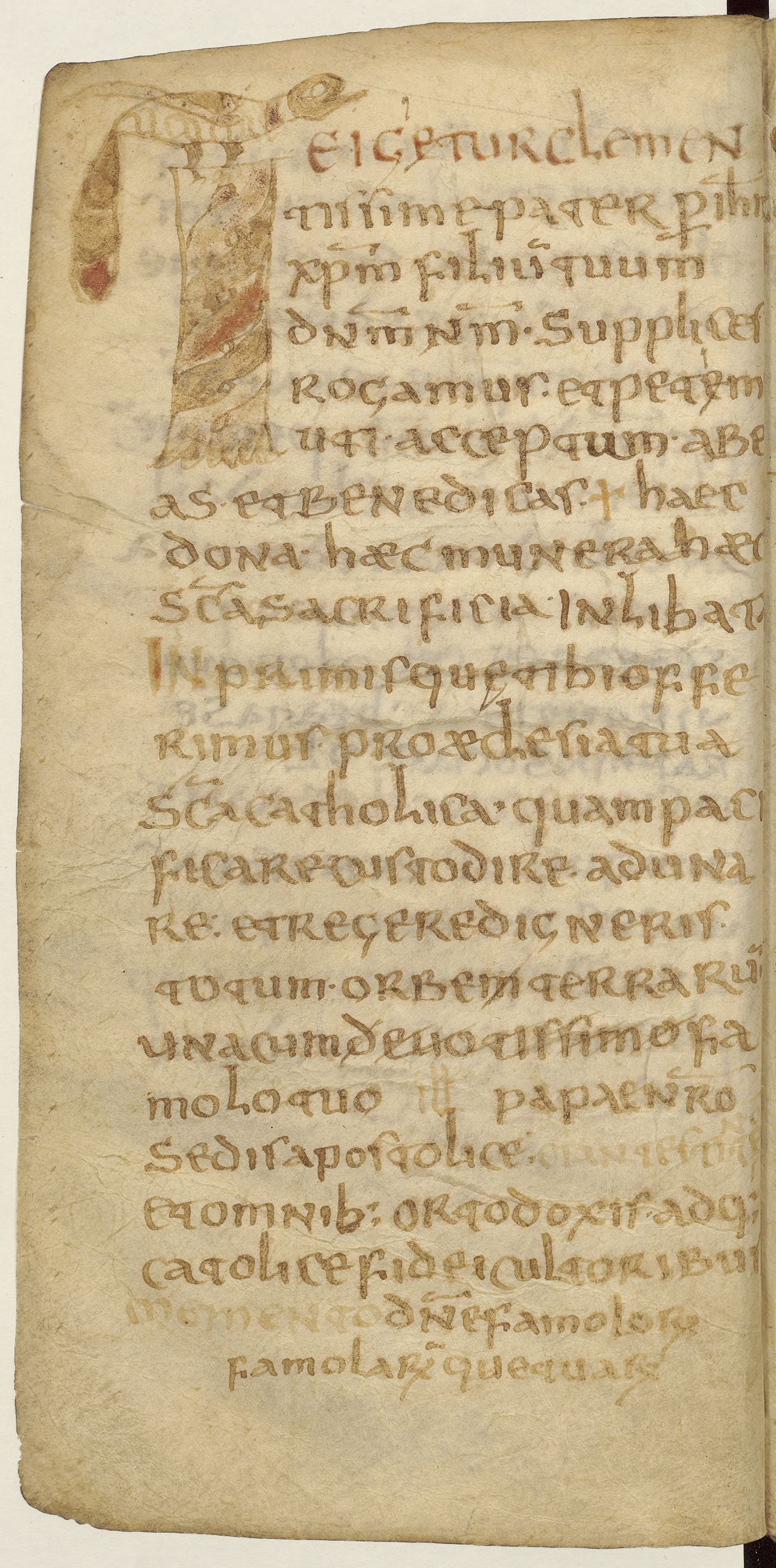

The Bobbio Missal (Paris, BNF lat. 13246) is a seventh-century Christian liturgical codex that probably originated in France.

The Missal contains a lectionary, a sacramentary and some canonical material (such as a penitential). It was found in Bobbio Abbey in Italy by the Benedictine monk Jean Mabillon between June 4 and June 9 of 1686.

The Missal is the earliest liturgical manuscript surviving from the medieval period. Its specific authorship and provenance is much disputed, though general agreement points to the valley of the Rhône, with Besançon (Mabillon's suggestion) and Vienne given as two popular options.

== Contents ==
"The manuscript is small in format, 180 x 90 mm (130 x 70 mm) with an average of 22 long lines to the page. That is, it is slightly narrower and taller than a modern paperback book. It has the appearance of a chunky (at 300 folios/600 pages) and easily transportable working copy of the crucial mass texts it contains". According to E.A. Lowe: "The Missal proper is written by one hand, designated as M... the few pages in uncial - the Mass pro principe, written by another hand - are referred to as M2... the pages containing added matter, in two different styles of crude writing, one showing distinct majuscule and the other as distinct minuscule traits, are referred to as A and a".

== List of contents ==
- Excerpts from Pseudo-Theophilus’ commentary on the Gospels (later addition)
- Pseudo-Augustine's sermon De Dies Malus (later addition)
- Daily readings
- Canon Missae
- Adventus
- Vigilia natalis Domini
- Natalis Domini
- St. Stephen
- The Holy Innocents
- Sts. Jacob and John
- Circumcisio Domini
- Epiphania
- Cathedra Sancti Petri
- In Sollemnitate Sanctae Mariae
- Quadragesima
- d Aurium Apertionem
- Expositio Symboli
- Traditio Symboli
- Cena Domini
- Lectiones in Parasceue
- Sabbato Sancto
- Orationes in Vigilio Paschae
- Benedictio Caerei
- Ad Christianum faciendum
- Ordo Baptismi
- Vigilia Paschae
- Pascha
- Inventio Sanctae Crucis
- Litaniae
- Ascensio Domini
- Quinquagesima
- A daily reading
- St. John the Baptist
- St. John's Passion
- St. Peter and Paul
- St. Sigismund
- Martyrs [unspecified]
- A Martyr [unspecified]
- A Confessor [unspecified]
- St. Martin
- A Virgin [Unspecified]
- Dedication of a Church
- For the sick
- St. Michael
- Pro iter agentibus
- For a priest [Sacerdos]
- Missa omnimoda
- Votive Masses
- For the living and the dead
- In domo cuiuslibet
- Sunday Masses
- Apologia
- Missa Pro Principe (later addition)
- Devotiones sive imprecationes (later addition)
- Missae cotidianae dominicales
- Depositio sacerdotis
- For the Dead
- Exorcismi salis et aquae
- Oratio in domo
- Various Benedictions
- Orationes vespertina et matutina
- Exorcismum olei
- Benedictio olei (later addition)
- Penitential
- Orationes super paenitentem
- Benedictio hominis cum domo sua (later addition)
- De lege ad missam celebrandam (later addition)
- De septem gradibus ecclesiae (later addition)
- De Peccatis ad infirmum ducentibus (later addition)
- De tempore nativitatis Christi (later addition)
- Orationes pro paenitentibus (later addition)
- Benedictiones panis (later addition)
- De omnibus cursibus (later addition)
- Symbolum apostolorum (later addition)
- De libris canonicis (later addition)
- Orationes ad missam (later addition)

== Provenance ==
Jean Mabillon believed the Missal to be of the Frankish tradition. He cited the collections "post nomina", "ad pacem" and the formula of the "Contestatio" as being characteristic of Gallican Liturgy. He also cited similarities between the Bobbio Missal and the Missale Gothicum (and Gallicanum Vetus) and the Lectionary of Luxeuil. The order of some significant feast days in the Bobbio Missal were also similar to the Gallican tradition; this ruled out the Mozarabic, Ambrosian or Roman traditions. The order of the liturgy in the Bobbio is Ambrosian, such as the placement of the scripture readings and the Pax Vobiscum. distinguishes it from the African tradition (here Mabillon quotes St. Augustine to support his deductions).

The content of the Missal do not completely match with the contents of the Gallican Missale Gothicum. Mabillon explains that liturgy was not uniform in Francia prior to Charlemagne and his reforms. Thus differences between dioceses and even parishes in their liturgy were common.

Mabillon dated the Missal to the late 7th century. As proof, he mentions that the name “Bertulfus” was found in the margin of a leaf. That would refer to the Abbot of Bobbio in the mid 7th century.

The contents of the Missal listed as collections, readings from the prophets, the apostles and the gospels, contestations of the Mass for the whole year and a penitential. The penitential is particularly of interest to Mabillon, as it increases our understanding of that era.

Mabillon states that it is possible the Missal could have come from, and been in use at, Besançon, the location of the Luxeuil Abbey. This is because the Missal includes the mass for St. Sigismund, King of Burgundy. Mabillon states unequivocally that the Missal could not have originated in Bobbio, as it does not refer to or contain any local saints or St. Columbanus and his disciples. In addition, the Missal does not contain monastic materials used at that time in Bobbio by the monks.

As the Missal does not contain anything about Columbanus and his disciples, Mabillon guesses that St. Columbanus himself may have been involved with the Missal, placing it in the Celtic tradition - but Mabillon does not elaborate on this. The Catholic Encyclopedia (1917) in its entry on the Celtic Rite, lists the Bobbio Missal in its section entitled "Manuscript sources - Irish (whether insular or continental)".

Mabillon notes that in the "Missa Pro Principe" (Mass for the Prince), after the "Contestatio" in the Canon, the name of the martyr Eugenia is commemorated as well as the other usual saints, this being a unique occurrence. It also happens in the mass for Christmas Eve. This special inclusion of Eugenia could be linked to a province or part of Frankia where a cult of Eugenia was prevalent, but Mabillon knew of no such place.

Mabillon's title for the manuscript is Sacramentario de Ecclesia Gallicana (Sacramentary of the Gallican Church) - that is, a book about Gallican liturgy. He deemed that more correct than calling it a Gallican Liturgy or a Liturgy from Bobbio, both of which titles refer specifically to books containing only liturgy.

== Modern scholarship ==
Many modern scholars consider the Bobbio Missal to be "one of the most intriguing liturgical manuscripts from early medieval Francia". The most comprehensive study to date is Yitzhak Hen and Rob Meens’ The Bobbio Missal: liturgy and religious culture in Merovingian Gaul. This book of collected works by international scholars who met in Utrecht in 2001 examines in detail "virtually all of the issues that have swirled around the Bobbio missal". It was published in 2004, and summarizes the history of scholarship on the manuscript in terms of philology, paleography, Latin spelling and orthography, theology and liturgy amongst other aspects.

Rosamond McKitterick suggested that the Missal could have been a gift to a certain priest or bishop, in celebration of his ordination or perhaps a special appointment. She says, "the book itself, therefore, may be witness to a complex web of social and pastoral association, and possibly to the relationship between a bishop and his clergy. Such a gift... would most likely have been a working copy, designed for constant reference and use". McKitterick also indicated that the additions to the Missal, which occurred at a later time, may have been added by members of the community in which the book was used, for practical purposes. McKitterick agrees with Mabillon on the origin of the manuscript in Provençal or somewhere in South-East France, around the late 7th/early 8th century, and that it was not designed for use in a monastic community.

David Ganz reports that the script in the Bobbio Missal is the "earliest true minuscule, a script which allowed scribes to save space without sacrificing legibility".

Marco Mostert, building on E.A. Lowe's division of the script into four characteristic styles of writing - M, M2, a and A - asserts that three of these styles were meant to be read aloud: "Having considered the punctuation and word spacing of the oldest quires, we have found the conventions of M to be consistent with those of late antique (liturgical) books meant for reading aloud by a native speaker of Latin - even if the consistency of the punctuation may leave something to be desired... M2 follows M’s conventions, as did A. The scribe of a, however, does not seem to have meant his texts to be read aloud (or performed) by anyone but himself".

Charles and Roger Wright note that additions were made to the Bobbio Missal - that is, texts were added some time afterward by a subsequent scribe, notably the sermon "De Dies Malus" and an untitled question/answer dialogue primarily regarding biblical and ecclesiastical history. The somewhat confusing grammatical state of these texts may have been due to the scribe's intention to utilize them as a basis or template for reading aloud, and thus was not designed to have been grammatically accurate.

Yitzak Hen hypothesizes, along with Lowe, that the Bobbio Missal was created by an individual in his private capacity for practical purposes, and that its small size indicates it traveled with its owner: "Judging from the script and the manuscript layout, it is well justified to describe the Bobbio Missal as a vade mecum of a Merovingian clergyman...It seems, therefore, safe to conclude that the Bobbio Missal is indeed a vade mecum of a bishop or even a priest, who offered liturgical services to secular, clerical and monastic communities...its unique and practical selections of prayers and benedictions supports this conclusion. A sacramentary like the Bobbio Missal would have been inadequate for the liturgical celebration in a Merovingian episcopal church".

A facsimile volume of the Bobbio Missal was produced for the Henry Bradshaw Society by E. A. Lowe in 1917 and an edition of the text in 1920.
