= Yitzhak Hen =

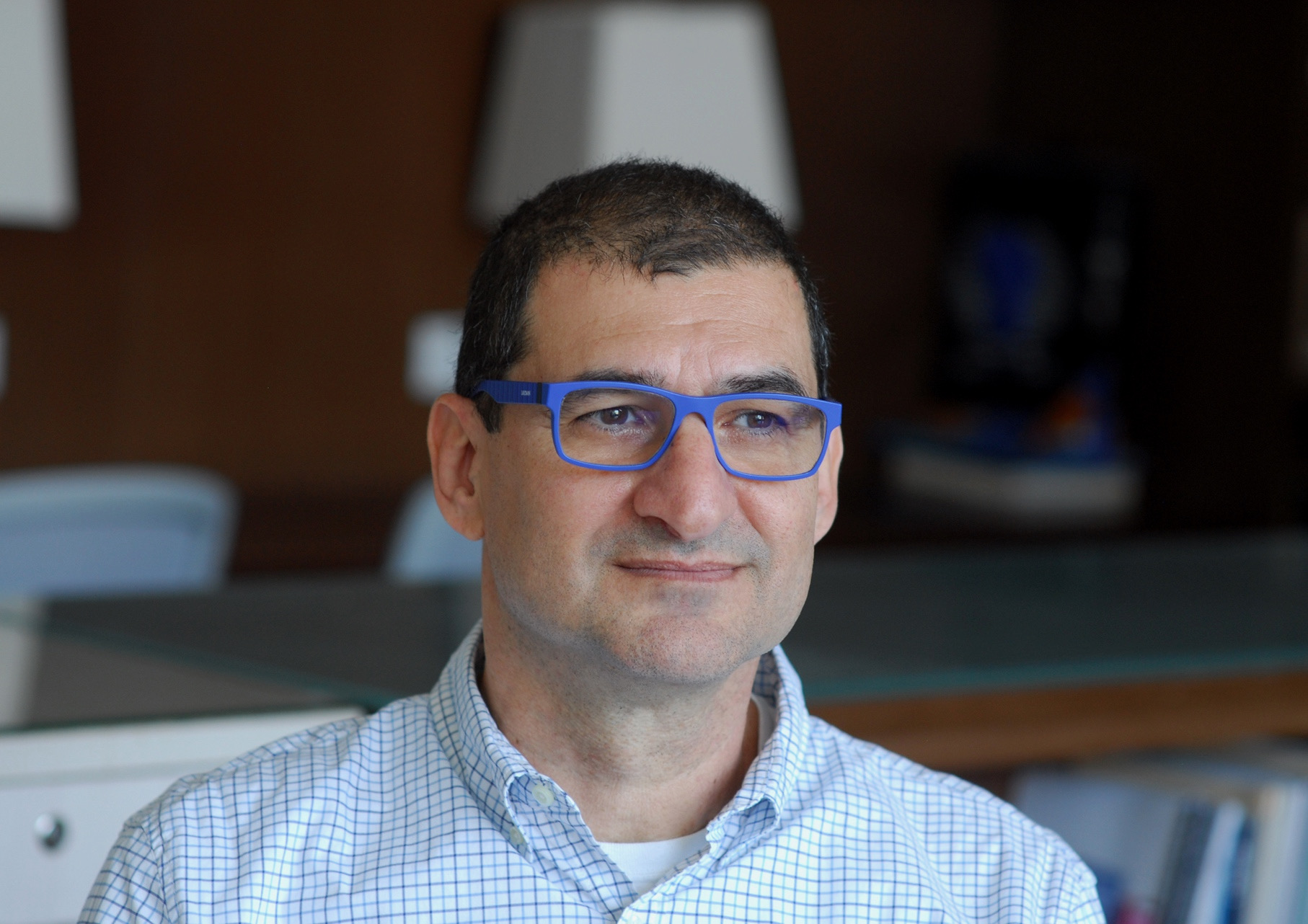
Professor Yitzhak Hen

Yitzhak Hen (Hebrew: יצחק חן; born 1963) is Anna and Sam Lopin Professor of History, formerly at Ben-Gurion University of the Negev (Israel). Since August 2018 he has been the director of Israel Institute for Advanced Studies at the Hebrew University of Jerusalem.

== Life ==
Hen completed his BA in History and Psychology at the Hebrew University of Jerusalem in 1988, and his MA in history at the Hebrew University of Jerusalem in 1991. He wrote his PhD (completed in 1994) at the University of Cambridge (UK). The title of his thesis was: Popular Culture in Merovingian Gaul, AD 481-751. After his PhD studies, Hen won the Wolfson post-doctorate prize for the academic year 1994–5, and subsequently he won the Yad Hanadiv post-doctorate prize for the study of European History. He was a Fellow in Residence at the Netherlands Institute for Advanced Study (NIAS) in 2000–2001, and a Visiting Fellow at Clare Hall (University of Cambridge) in 2007–8. Since 2008 he is a Life Member of Clare Hall.

== Works ==
Hen's research interests are: social, religious and cultural history of the Barbarian kingdoms of the early medieval West; early Christian liturgy; Latin palaeography and codicology. His current research, for which he won a grant from the Israel Science Foundation, is: Western Arianism: Politics and Religious Culture in the Early Medieval West. Hen is member of the editorial board of the journals Historia (in Hebrew) and History Compass; member of the advisory board of the series Cursor Mundi; and the general editor of the series Cultural Encounters in Late Antiquity and the Middle Ages.

In his first book, Culture and Religion in Merovingian Gaul, AD 481-751 (Leiden, 1995) Hen has investigate the shared meanings, attitudes and values, and the symbolic forms in which they were expressed or embodied in Merovingian society. Although too often depicted as a barbaric society, with the full pejorative meaning of these words – a view partly derived from Gregory of Tours, our main source and sometimes our only one to the first century of Merovingian rule – Merovingian Gaul, Hen argues, was a direct continuation of the Roman civilisation in terms of social standards, morals and culture. Merovingian culture, as he demonstrated, had some distinctive literate aspects, and it was basically Christian, indeed deeply shaped by Christian liturgy. Superstitions and pagan survivals, which, in the past, have too often dominated the discussion of Merovingian culture and religion, were marginal and far from representative. Moreover, through a detailed examination of the sources he established that the prevailing notion of Merovingian society as Christian by name but Pagan by practice was, in fact, generated by Carolingian propaganda concerning the Merovingian past. The anti-Merovingian propaganda was created and disseminated by the Carolingians, their supporters and scholars. Its purpose was to undermine and discredit the Merovingian dynasty and to pave the way for legitimating the Carolingian usurpation. Paradoxically, it is still effective and deceives historians who, relying heavily on Carolingian sources, have produced a deriding picture of Merovingian Gaul.

In The Royal Patronage of Liturgy in Frankish Gaul to the Death of Charles the Bald (877) (London, 2001), the examination of the royal patronage of liturgy in the Frankish kingdoms provided a remarkable opportunity to re-examine some of the most prevailing notions regarding the Frankish liturgy, such as the traditional assumption that the liturgy of Frankish Gaul during the Carolingian period was a unified liturgy and, moreover, the product of a unified Frankish Church. Similarly, the reports on the Romanisation of the Frankish liturgy under Pippin III and Charlemagne, which, in the past, were accepted at face value, appear to be part of what Hen calls ‘the Carolingian rhetoric of reforms’. A careful examination of the sources from early medieval Francia demonstrates how the Frankish kings, and foremost among them Charlemagne, realised the political power within the patronage of liturgy, and therefore made ample use of it as a political means of royal propaganda. Through liturgy they disseminated political messages and ideology in an attempt to shape the ‘public opinion’, and this is precisely why they invested vast amounts of landed property and privileges in patronising liturgical activity. The introduction of liturgy as an extremely informative source for the study of the political culture and the social practices of the early medieval West was rather unusual and innovative, and many subsequent studies followed suit.

The study of numerous unpublished manuscripts was a significant part of Hen's research. This activity also brought some new findings and discoveries, such as The Sacramentary of Echternach, which he edited for the Henry Bradshaw Society; the Pseudo-Theophilus’ Commentary on the Four Gospels, which he discussed in a separate paper; or the Arundel manuscript of the Annales Mettenses Priores, which is the subject of another paper.

His latest book investigates the place of the royal court and the mechanisms of patronage which operated through it in several kingdoms of the early Middle Ages. Hen's general approach is based on the conviction that the roots of later medieval developments, and especially of the so-called Carolingian Renaissance, are to be sought in the centuries immediately succeeding the period of Roman rule. It was in this period that Roman and Christian ideals were mingled with indigenous Germanic practices, and thus sow the seeds of what we now call ‘the medieval civilisation’. In this book Hen discusses the literary activities associated with several early medieval royal courts, such as the court of the Vandal court of Thrasamund, The Ostrogothic court of Theoderic the Great, the Visigothic court of Sisebut, and the Frankish court of Clothar II and Dagobert I. The comparative analysis of these barbarian courts highlight the continuities and similarities, as well as the various differences, that characterised the cultural activity of the early medieval West, and it clarifies how crucial the barbarian precedents are for assessing and understanding the Carolingian achievement and, subsequently, later medieval culture and society.

== Publications ==
=== Books ===
- Culture and Religion in Merovingian Gaul, A.D. 481-751 (Brill Publishers: Leiden, New York and Köln, 1995).
- The Sacramentary of Echternach, Henry Bradshaw Society 110 (Boydell & Brewer: London, 1997).
- The End of the First Millennium: Religion, Society, and Culture in the Tenth Century (MOD Press: Tel-Aviv, 2000) [in Hebrew].
- The Royal Patronage of Liturgy in Frankish Gaul to the Death of Charles the Bald (877), Henry Bradshaw Society, subsidia 3 (Boydell & Brewer: London, 2001).
- The Beginning of Europe: Western Europe in the Early Middle Ages, written with Ora Limor, 3 vols. (OU Press: Tel-Aviv, 2003) [in Hebrew].
- Roman Barbarians: The Royal Court and Culture in the Early Medieval West (Palgrave-Macmillan: London and New York City, 2007) [Bulgarian translation by Elika Rafi (Sophia, 2010)].
- Western Arianism: Politics and Religious Culture in the Early Medieval West (Cambridge University Press: Cambridge, forthcoming)

=== Edited volumes ===
- The Uses of the Past in the Early Middle Ages, co-edited with Matthew Innes (Cambridge University Press: Cambridge, 2000).
- De Sion Exibit Lex et Verbum Domini de Hierusalem. Studies on Medieval Law, Liturgy and Literature in honour of Amnon Linder, Cultural Encounters in Late Antiquity and the Middle Ages, 1 (Brepols: Turnhout, 2001).
- Women, Children and the Elderly. Studies in Honour of Shulamith Shahar, co-edited with Miri Eliav-Feldon (Merkaz Zalman Shazar: Jerusalem, 2002) [in Hebrew].
- The Bobbio Missal: Liturgy and Religious Culture in Merovingian Gaul, co-edited with Rob Meens (Cambridge University Press: Cambridge, 2004)
- Wilhelm Levison (1876-1947): Ein jüdisches Forscherleben zwischen wissenschaftlicher Anerkennung und politischem Exil, co-edited with Matthias Becher, Bonner Historische Forschungen 63 (Verlag Franz Schmitt: Siegburg, 2010).
- Sermo doctorum: Compilers, Preachers and their Audiences in the Early Medieval West, co-edited with Max Diesenberger and Marianne Pollheimer (Brepols: Turnhout, forthcoming).
- Barbarians and Jews: Jews and Judaism in the Early Medieval West, co-edited with Ora Limor and Tom F.X. Noble (Brepols: Turnhout, forthcoming).
- The Cambridge Companion to Early Medieval Western Liturgy (Cambridge University Press: Cambridge, forthcoming).

=== Translations ===
- Einhard: Life of Charlemagne, translation, introduction, commentary and appendices (OU Press: Tel-Aviv, 2005) [in Hebrew].

== Sources ==
- "Exploding the Myths ", BGU Now (Fall 2006), 24–25.
- Yitzhak Hen at The Martin Buber Society of Fellows in the Humanities website
