= Rob Meens =

Dutch historian

Robert Marie Joseph "Rob" Meens (born 14 August 1959, Heerlen) is a Dutch historian and professor at Utrecht University.

Meens got his Ph.D. from Nijmegen University in 1994. He was a fellow at the Davis Center for Historical Studies at Princeton University in 1997-1998, and taught at the University of Vienna before an appointment as professor in history in Utrecht.

A specialist in medieval religious culture, he is the co-editor, with Yitzhak Hen, of a collection of essays on the Bobbio Missal, a collection "said to define a new orthodoxy on the subject". He has researched penitentials with a research group at Utrecht (a continuation of the important work done by Raymund Kottje) since the early 2000s, and his Penance in Medieval Europe, 600-1200 was published in 2014 by Cambridge UP.
