= Edmund Bishop =

English Catholic liturgical historian (d. 1917)

Edmund Bishop (17 May 1846 in Totnes – 17 February 1917 in Barnstaple) was an English Roman Catholic historian of Christian liturgy. He collaborated with Francis Aidan Gasquet, OSB, in the writing of two notable works in this field.

== Life ==
Bishop was born at Totnes, Devon, in 1846. His early schooling was received in Ashburton and then at the Exeter School. Afterwards he was sent to a Catholic school in Belgium. Upon his return, he began his career in London as a secretary to the noted scholar, Thomas Carlyle. The one printer who could read Carlyle's handwritten manuscripts had died, and it became necessary for him to find someone who could make clear copies of his writings. This must have been a severe test of Bishop's intelligence, as Carlyle wrote on any odd slip of paper that came to his hand, scribbled, scrawled, and added or corrected in every margin and corner of the paper, hooking together the scattered sentences with rapid slashes of the pen. After reviewing Bishop's first attempt at rendering his own script, Carlyle cast an eye over both the copy and copyist, and then made the observation that the handwriting was out of the ordinary, and so, he was inclined to think, was the writer. Bishop's relations with Carlyle continued to be easy and pleasant, and afterwards he cherished fond memories of "the old Curmudgeon".

In 1864 Bishop was hired by the Education Department of the Privy Council Office, where he was employed for the next 20 years. In 1867 he was received into the Catholic Church. During his time in the Education Office he laid the foundations of his wide and varied learning. The easy office hours, after he had risen rapidly to a high place in his department, together with his vacations, left sufficient leisure for study, and he used this time fruitfully. He bought books, copied documents at both the British Museum and the British Public Record Office, reading assiduously and with rapidity. Gifted with a phenomenal memory, he never forgot what he read. It was during this period that he transcribed, analysed and annotated his monumental Collectio Britannica, containing copies of 300 papal letters dating from the 5th to the 11th centuries. Unable to find a publisher in England, he handed over the whole document to Monumenta Germaniae Historica, who released the work.

Bishop retired from the Education Office in 1885, having resolved to make trial of a calling which he felt to the monastic life. In April 1886 he was accepted by Downside Abbey, where he remained as a postulant until 1889. His frail health finally prevented him from being received as a monk.

In 1893 Bishop took lodgings together with Dom Francis Aidan Gasquet, OSB, a monk of Downside Abbey, whom he had come to know during his time there as a candidate. They lived and worked together till Gasquet's election as Abbot President of the English Benedictine Congregation in 1901. The following year he retired to the home of his sister in Barnstaple, Devon.

Bishop died in 1917. He was granted the privilege of having his body buried in the monastic cemetery at Downside Abbey.

== Main publications ==
- Bishop, Edmund (1876). St. Boniface and his correspondence: reprinted from the Transactions of the Devonshire Association for the Advancement of Science, Literature, and Art. p. 20 p.
- Bishop, Edmund; Fernand de Mély (1892–95). Bibliographie générale des inventaires imprimés. Paris: E. Leroux. pp. 3 v. 25 cm.
- Bishop, Edmund; Francis Aidan Gasquet (1908). The Bosworth psalter: an account of a manuscript formerly belonging to O. Turville-Petre, Esq. of Bosworth Hall, now Addit. ms. 37517 at the British Museum. London: Bell. p. 189 p.
- Bishop, Edmund (1918). Liturgica historica: papers on the liturgy and religious life of the Western church. Clarendon Press. xiv, 506 p.
- Bishop, Edmund; Francis Aidan Gasquet (1928) [1891]. Edward VI and the Book of Common Prayer (3rd ed.). London: Sheed and Ward. p. xx, 276 p.

== Works about Bishop ==
- Abercrombie, Nigel (1952). The writings of Edmund Bishop, b. 1846; d. 1917 : a bibliography. London: Repr. from The Times Literary Supplement.
- Abercrombie, Nigel (1959). The life and work of Edmund Bishop. London: Longmans. p. xv, 539 p.

== See also ==
- Henry Bradshaw Society
- Celtic Rite
- Schoeck, R.J. (2004). "Bishop, Edmund (1846-1917)". Oxford Dictionary of National Biography (online ed.). Oxford University Press. doi:10.1093/ref:odnb/31903. (Subscription or UK public library membership required.)
