= Celtic Rite =

Liturgical practices in the Middle Ages

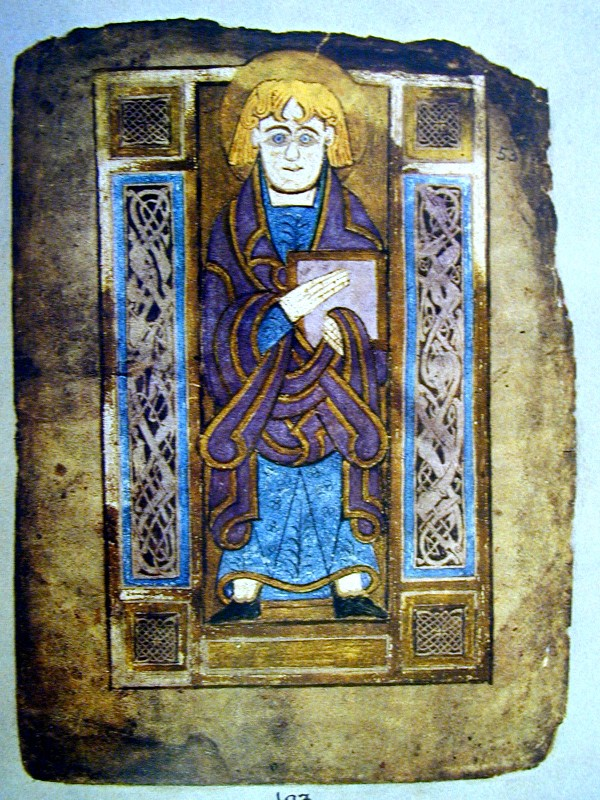
Portrait of St John from The Book of Mulling

The term "Celtic Rite" is applied to the various liturgical rites used in Celtic Christianity in Britain, Ireland and Brittany and the monasteries founded by St. Columbanus and Saint Catald in France, Germany, Switzerland, and Italy during the Early Middle Ages. The term is not meant to imply homogeneity; instead it is used to describe a diverse range of liturgical practices united by lineage and geography.

== Welsh church ==
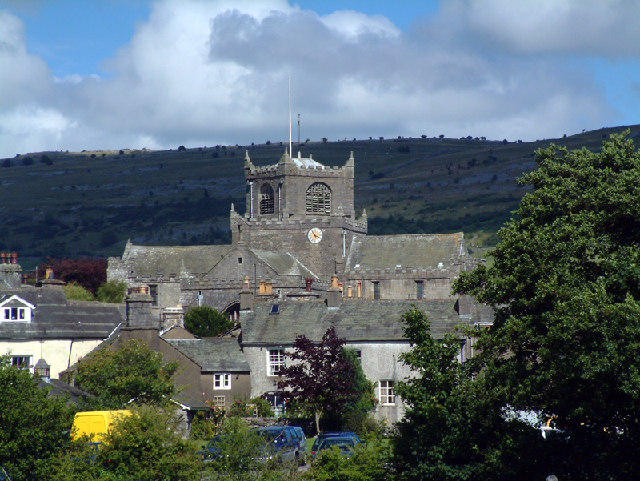
Cartmel on Morecambe Bay in north-west England, the location of an early monastic community

Before the 8th century AD there were several Christian rites in Western Europe. Such diversity of practice was often considered unimportant so long as Rome's primacy was accepted. Gradually the diversity tended to lessen so that by the time of the final fusion in the Carolingian period the Roman Rite, its Ambrosian variant, and the Hispano-Gallican Mozarabic Rite were practically all that were left.

British bishops attended the Council of Arles in A.D. 314 and the Council of Rimini in 359. Communication with Gaul may be inferred from dedications to St. Martin at Whithorn and at Canterbury, from the mission of Victridius of Rouen in A.D. 396 and those of Germanus of Auxerre, with St. Lupus in 429 and with St. Severus in 447, directed against the Pelagianism of which the bishops of Britain stood accused.

However much of Britain derived their religion from Irish missionaries. Aidan of Lindisfarne, Foillan, Diuma, Finan of Lindisfarne, Jaruman and others evangelised the Anglo-Saxons. Ia of Cornwall and her companions, Saint Piran, St. Sennen, Petroc came to Cornwall and probably brought with them whatever rites they were accustomed to. Cornwall had an ecclesiastical quarrel with Wessex in the days of St. Aldhelm, which appears in Leofric's Missal, though the details of it are not specified.

The certain points of difference between the British Church and the Roman in prior to Bede were: (1) The rule of keeping Easter (2) the tonsure (3) the manner of baptizing. Gildas also records elements of a different rite of ordination.

=== Liturgy ===
There is a Mass, probably of the 9th century, apparently Cornish since it mentions "Ecclesia Lanaledensis" (perhaps St Germans in Cornwall, though this was also the Breton name of Aleth, now part of Saint-Malo) and in honour of St. Germanus. It is quite Roman in type, probably written after that part of Cornwall had come under Saxon influence, but with a unique Proper Preface. The manuscript also contains glosses, held by Professor Loth to be Welsh but possibly Cornish or Breton. There is little other evidence as to what liturgy was in use.

Anglicans of the 19th century such as Sir William Palmer in his Origines Liturgicae and the Bishop of Chichester in his Story of the English Prayerbook proposed that Irenaeus, a disciple of St. Polycarp the disciple of St. John the Divine, brought the Ephesine Rite to Provence whence it spread through Gaul to Britain and became the foundation of the Sarum Rite.

The Ephesine origin of the Gallican Rite rested first upon a statement of Colmán of Lindisfarne in 664 at the Synod of Whitby respecting the origin of Easter and second upon an 8th-century Irish writer who derived the divine office from Alexandria. Archbishop Nuttall also asserted the Eastern origin of the Irish rite. The Catholic Encyclopedia disagreed, asserting (see also Ambrosian Rite) that the Sarum Rite is "merely a local variety of the Roman, and that the influence of the Gallican Rite upon it is no greater than upon any other Roman variety".

A letter from Pope Zachary to St. Boniface (1 May 748, reports that an English synod had forbidden any baptism except in the name of the Trinity and declared that whoever omits the Name of any Person of the Trinity does not truly baptise. Henry Spelman and Wilkins put this synod at London in 603, the time of St. Augustine while Mansi makes its date the first year of Theodore of Tarsus, 668. The possibility of priests, presumably Irish, having been invalidly baptized was considered in the "Poenitentiale Theodori" (Lib. II, cap. iii, 13), and in cap. ix of the same book, after ordering the reordination of those ordained by Scottish and British bishops "who are not Catholic in their Easter and tonsure" and the asperging of churches consecrated by them. It has been conjectured that the British Church resembled the Hispanic in baptizing with a single immersion. This form had been allowed by Rome in the case of Iberia.

=== Celtic Passover versus Roman Easter ===
The Irish, the English, and the Britons adhered to the Jewish Passover instead of Easter Sunday. They adhered to moon phases and counted the third week of the moon (for Passover) from the 14th to the 20th instead of from the 15th to the 21st.

Colman at the Synod of Whitby may have had the Quartodeciman controversy in mind when he claimed an Ephesian origin for the Irish calculations of Passover. St. Wilfrid answered that according to the Quartodeciman rule Passover might be kept on any day of the week, not just a Sunday, whereas the Irish and those they had evangelised (such as the Anglo-Saxons) kept it on Passover only. St. Aldhelm in his letter to King Gerontius of Dumnonia also seems to charge the Cornish with Quartodecimanism.

The Easter versus Passover question was eventually settled at various times in different places. The following dates are derived from Haddan and Stubbs: Western, eastern and southern Ireland, 626-8; northern-west Ireland, 692; Northumbria (converted by Irish missions), 664; East Devon and Somerset, 705; the Picts, 710; Iona, 716-8; Strathclyde, 721; North Wales, 768; South Wales, 777. Cornwall held out the longest of any, perhaps even, in parts, to the time of Bishop Aedwulf of Crediton (909).

== Establishment of the Irish Rite ==
There were Christians in Ireland before Saint Patrick, but we have no information as to how they worshipped, and their existence is ignored by Tirechan's 7th-century Catalogus Sanctorum Hiberniae, which divides the saints of Ireland into three orders covering about 225 years from the coming of St. Patrick in 440 in the reign of Laoghaire MacNeil to the reign of Blathmac and Diarmait sons of Áed Sláine in 665. Each order is stated to have lasted for the reigns of four kings - symmetry is attained by omitting about six intervening reigns, but the outside dates of each period are clear enough, and the document relates customs of the Divine Office and the Easter and tonsure questions.

The first order was in the time of Saint Patrick, from the reign of Laoghaire to that of Túathal Máelgarb (c. 440–544). They were all bishops, 350 in number, founders of churches, all Romans, French (i.e. the Gauls), Britons and Scots. They had one Head, Christ, one leader, Patrick, one Mass and one tonsure from ear to ear and they celebrated Easter a fortnight after the spring equinox ("quarta decima luna post aequinoctium vernale").

The second order was of few bishops and many priests, 300 in number. It lasted from the end of the reign of Tuathal to that of Áed mac Ainmuirech (c. 544–99). They had one head, Christ, they celebrated different Masses and different rules ("diversas regulas"), they had one Easter, the fourteenth of the moon after the equinox, and one tonsure from ear to ear. They received a Mass from the Britons, David of Wales, Gilla (Gildas), and Docus (Cadoc). The Life of Gildas tells how King Ainmuire mac Sétnai sent for Gildas to restore ecclesiastical order in his kingdom in which the Catholic faith was being laid aside.

The third order were priests and a few bishops, 100 in number, living in wildernesses on an ascetic diet ("qui in locis desertis habitabant et oleribus et aqua et eleemosynis vivebant, propria devitabant"), evidently hermits and monks. They had different Masses, different rules, and different tonsures, ("alii enim habebant coronam, alii caesariem"), and celebrated different Easters, some on the fourteenth, some on the sixteenth, of the moon "with hard intention" ("cum duris intentionibus") which perhaps means "obstinately". These lasted from the reign of Áed Sláine to that of his two sons Diarmait and Blathmac (c. 599–665).

The "unam celebrationem" of the first order and the "diversas regulas" of the second and third probably both refer to the Divine Office. The meaning seems to be that the first order celebrated a form of Mass introduced by Patrick, who was the pupil of Germanus of Auxerre and Honoratus of Lerins, perhaps a Mass of the Gallican type. The 8th-century tract in Cott. MS. Nero A. II states that St. Germanus taught the "Cursus Scottorum" to St. Patrick. It is clear that the British Mass introduced by David, Gildas, and Cadoc differed from it. The second and third orders used partly Patrick's Mass and partly one of British origin, and in the case of the third order Roman modifications were also introduced.

The working of the "Catalogus" seems to imply that the first and second orders were Quartodecimans, but this is clearly not the meaning, or on the same argument the third order must have been partly Sextodecimans – if there were such things – and moreover we have the already mentioned statement of St. Wilfrid, the opponent of the Celtic Easter, at the Synod of Whitby, that such was not the case. Tirechan can only mean what we know from other sources: that the fourteenth day of the moon was the earliest day on which Easter could fall, not that it was kept on that day, Sunday or weekday. It was the same ambiguity of expression which misled Colman in 664 and St. Aldhelm in 704. The first and second orders used the Celtic tonsure, and it seems that the Roman coronal tonsure came partly into use during the period of the third order.

After that we have an obscure period, during which the Roman Easter which had been accepted in South Ireland in 626–628, became universal, being accepted by North Ireland in 692, and it seems probable that a Mass on the model of the Carlsruhe and Piacenza fragments and the Stowe and Bobbio Missals - a Roman Canon with some features of a non-Roman type - came into general use. It was not until the 12th century that the separate Irish Rite, which, according to Gilbert, Bishop of Limerick (1106–39), was in use in nearly all Ireland, was abolished. Saint Malachy, bishop of Armagh (1134–48), began the campaign against it, and at the Synod of Cashel, in 1172, a Roman Rite "juxta quod Anglicana observat Ecclesia" was finally substituted.

== Scottish sources ==
In Scotland there is very little information. Intercourse with Ireland was considerable and the few details that can be gathered from such sources as Adamnan's Life of St. Columba and the various relics of the Scoto-Northumbrian Church point to a general similarity with Ireland in the earlier period. Of the rite of the monastic order of the Culdees (Céli Dé or Goillidhe-Dé, servants of God, or possibly Cultores Dei) very little is known, but they certainly had a rite of their own, which may have been similar to the Irish.

The Roman Easter and tonsure were adopted by the Picts in 710, and at Iona in 716–18, and much later, in about 1080, St. Margaret of Scotland, wife of King Malcolm III, wishing to reform the Scottish church in a Roman direction, discovered and abolished certain peculiar customs of which Theodoric, her chaplain and biographer, tells us less than we could wish.

It seems that the Scots did not begin Lent on Ash Wednesday but on the Monday following, as is still the Ambrosian practice. They refused to communicate on Easter Day and arguments on the subject make it seem as if the laity never communicated at all. In some places they celebrated Mass "contra totius Ecclesiae consuetudinem, nescio quo ritu barbaro" ("contrary to the customs of the whole Church, with I know not what barbaric rite"). The last statement may be read in connection with that in the Register of St. Andrew's (drawn up 1144–53), "Keledei in angulo quodam ecclesiae, quae modica nimis est, suum officum more suo celebrant".

How much difference there may have been cannot be judged from these expressions. Scotland may have retained a primitive Celtic Rite, or it may have used the greatly Romanized Stowe or Bobbio Mass. The one fragment of a Scottish Rite, the Office of the Communion of the Sick, in the Book of Deer, probably 11th century, is certainly non-Roman in type, and agrees with those in the extant Irish books.

The Book of Deer is a 10th-century gospel book from Old Deer, Aberdeenshire, Scotland, with early 12th-century additions in Latin, Old Irish and Scottish Gaelic. Now in the Cambridge University Library. It contains part of an order for the communion of the sick, with a Gaelic rubric. The origin of the book is uncertain.

== Irish (insular and continental) sources ==
In 590 St. Columbanus and his companions travelled to the Continent and established monasteries throughout France, South Germany, Switzerland, and North Italy, of which the best known were Luxeuil, Bobbio, St. Galen, and Ratisbon. It is from the Rule of St. Columbanus that we know something of a Celtic Divine Office. Irish missionaries, with their very strict rule, were not altogether popular among the lax Gallican clergy, who tried to get them discouraged.

At a council at Macon, in 623, certain charges brought by one Agrestius were considered. Among them is the following: "In summâ quod a caeterorum ritu ac norma desciscerent et sacra mysteria sollemnia orationum et collectarum multiplici varietate celebrarent". There has been more than one interpretation of this phrase, some holding, with Pope Benedict XIV, that it refers to the use of many collects before the Epistle, instead of the one collect of the then Roman Missal, others that it implies a multiplicity of variables in the whole Mass, analogous to that existing in the Hispano-Gallican Rite. The Columbanian monasteries gradually drifted into the Benedictine Order.

The general conclusion seems to be that, while the Irish were not above borrowing from other Western nations, they originated a good deal themselves, much of which eventually passed into that composite rite which is now known as Roman. This seems to be a rough statement of the opinion of the English Roman Catholic scholar Edmund Bishop, which involves the much larger question of the origin and development of all the Western rites.

=== The Antiphonary of Bangor ===
Copied at the Abbey of Bobbio from a manuscript compiled at the monastery of Bangor in County Down, during the time of Abbot Cronan (680–91), this so-called "antiphonary" is now in the Ambrosian Library at Milan. It contains a large collection of canticles, hymns, collects, and antiphons, all, with very few exceptions, relating to the Divine Office. All but two of the twenty-one pieces in the Turin fragment are found in this manuscript also.

=== The Bobbio Missal ===
A manuscript of the 7th century found by Mabillon at Bobbio in North Italy, now in the Bibliothèque nationale at Paris (Lat. 13,246). V. Neale and Forbes entitle it Missale Vesontionense seu Sacramentarium Gallicanum, its attribution to Besançon being due to the presence of a Mass in honour of St. Sigismund. Monseigneur Duchesne appears to consider it to be more or less Ambrosian, but Edmund Bishop considers it to be "an example of the kind of book in vogue in the second age of the Irish Saints", and connects it with the undoubtedly Irish Stowe Missal. It contains a Missa Romensis cottidiana and Masses for various days and intentions, with the Order of Baptism and the Benedictio Cerei.

=== The Stowe Missal ===
The Stowe Missal is a manuscript of the late 8th or early 9th century, with alterations in later hands, most of them written by one Moelcaich, who signs his name at the end of the Canon, and whom Dr. MacCarthy identifies, not very convincingly, with Moelcaich MacFlann, c. 750. It was discovered abroad, in the 18th century, by John Grace of Nenah, from whom it passed to the Duke of Buckingham's library at Stowe. It was bought by the Earl of Ashburnham in 1849, and from his collection it went to the Royal Irish Academy. It contains part of the Gospel of St. John, probably quite unconnected with what follows, bound up with the Ordinary and Canon of the Mass, three Masses, the Order of Baptism and of the Visitation, Unction, and Communion of the Sick, and a treatise in Irish on the Mass, of which a variant is found in the "Leabhar Breac".

The non-Roman elements in the Stowe Missal are: (1) The Bidding Litany between the Epistle and Gospel, which, however, came after the Gospel in the Gallican. (2) The Post-Sanctus. (3) the Responsory of the Fraction. (4) The position of the Fraction before the Pater Noster. (5) the elaborate Fraction. (6) the Communion Antiphons, and Responsory. In the "missa apostolorum et martirum et sanctorum et sanctarum virginum", in the Stowe, the Preface and Sanctus are followed by a Post-Sanctus of regular Hispano-Gallican form, "Vere sanctus, vere benedictus"" etc., which modulates directly into the "Qui pridie"" with no place for the intervention of "Te igitur""and the rest of the first part of the Gelasian Canon. This may represent an Irish Mass as it was before the Gelasian interpolation. In the other two Masses this is not shown.

=== The Book of Dimma ===
An 8th-century Irish pocket gospel book originally from the Abbey of Roscrea, County Tipperary, Ireland. The Book of Dimma contains the four gospels and has an order for the unction and communion of the sick inserted between the gospels of Luke and John.

=== The Book of Mulling ===
The Book of Mulling is a manuscript of the late 8th century. It contains the four Gospels, an office for the unction and communion of the sick, and a fragmentary directory or plan of a service. Dr. Lawlor thought the latter a plan of a daily office used morning and evening but the editors of the Liber Hymnorum took it as a special penitential service and compared it with the penitential office sketched out in the Second Vision of Adamnan in the Speckled Book, which, as interpreted by them, it certainly resembles.

The service plan in the Book of Mulling is:

1. (illegible)
2. Magnificat
3. Stanzas 4, 5, 6 of St. Columba's hymn Noli pater
4. A lesson from St. Matt. v
5. The last three stanzas of the hymn of St. Secundus, Audite omnes
6. Two supplementary stanzas
7. The last three stanzas of the hymn of Cumma in Fota, Celebra Juda
8. Antiphon Exaudi nos Deus, appended to this hymn
9. Last three stanzas of St. Hillary's hymn, Hymnum dicat
10. Either the antiphon Unitas in Trinitate or (as sketch of Adamnan seems to show) the hymn of St. Colman MacMurchon in honour of St. Michael, In Trinitate spes mea
11. The Creed
12. The Paternoster
13. Illegible, possibly the collect Ascendat oratio.

=== Liber Hymnorum (The Book of Hymns) ===
This is a collection of forty hymns in Latin and Irish, almost all of Irish origin, with canticles and "ccclxv orationes quas beatus Gregorius de toto psalterio congregavit". There are explanatory prefaces in Irish or Latin to each hymn. Some of the hymns are found in the Antiphonary of Bangor, the Leabhar Breac, and the Book of Cerne. There are two manuscripts of this collection, not agreeing exactly, one in Trinity College, Dublin, of the 11th century, and one in the Franciscan Convent at Dublin, of somewhat later date.

In the "Liber Hymnorum" there are hymns by Patrick, Columba, Gildas, Sechnall, Ultan, Cummaim of Clonfert, Muging, Coleman mac Ui Clussaigh, Colman Mac Murchan, Cuchuimne, Óengus of Tallaght, Fiacc, Broccan, Sanctam, Scandalan Mor, Mael-Isu ua Brolchain, and Ninine, besides a few by non-Irish poets.

=== Fragmentary texts ===
The Turin Fragment is a manuscript of the 7th century in the Turin Library. Mayer considers the fragment to have been written at Bobbio. It consists of six leaves and contains the canticles, "Cantemus Domino", "Benedicite", and "Te Deum", with collects to follow those and the Laudate psalms (cxlvii-cl) and the "Benedictus", the text of which is not given, two hymns with collects to follow them, and two other prayers.

There are two Karlsruhe Fragments: four pages in an Irish hand of the late 8th or early 9th century in the Library of Karlsruhe contain parts of three Masses, one of which is "pro captivis". The arrangement resembles that of the Bobbio Missal, in that the Epistles and Gospels seem to have preceded the other variables under the title of lectiones ad misam. Another four pages in an Irish hand probably of the 9th century contain fragments of Masses and a variant of the intercessions inserted in the Intercession for the Living in the Stowe Missal and in Witzel's extracts from the Fulda Manuscript. There are also some fragments in Irish.

The Piacenza Fragment consists of four pages (of which the two outer are illegible) in an Irish hand, possibly of the 10th century. The two inner pages contain parts of three Masses, one of which is headed "ordo missae sanctae mariae". In the others are contained the Prefaces of two of the Sunday Masses in the Bobbio Missal, one of which is used on the eighth Sunday after the Epiphany in the Mozarabic.

The St. Gall Fragments are 8th- and 9th-century fragments in Manuscripts 1394 and 1395 in the Library of St. Gallen. The first book (1394) contains part of an ordinary of the Mass which, as far as it goes, resembles that in the Stowe Missal. The second (1395) contains the confession and litany, which also begin the Stowe Missal, a fragment of a Mass of the Dead, a prayer at the Visitation of the Sick, and three forms for the blessing of salt and water.

The Basel Fragment is a 9th-century Greek Psalter with a Latin interlinear translation. On a fly-leaf at the beginning are two hymns in honour of Mary and of St. Bridget, a prayer to Mary and to the angels and saints, and a long prayer "De conscientiae reatu ante altare".

The Zürich Fragment is a 10th-century leaf containing part of an office for the profession of a nun.

=== Other manuscripts ===
Besides these manuscripts there are certain others bearing on the subject which are not liturgical, and some of which are not Celtic, though they show signs of Celtic influences. The Book of Cerne is a large early 9th-century manuscript collection of prayers, etc. made for Æthelwold, Bishop of Lichfield (820–40). It once belonged to the Abbey of Cerne in Dorset, but is Mercian in origin and shows Irish, Anglo-Saxon, Carolingian, Roman, and Byzantine influences. The Leabhar Breac or Speckled Book, an Irish manuscript of the 14th century, belonging to the Royal Irish Academy, contains a very large collection of ecclesiastical and religious pieces in Irish. The contents are not as a rule of a liturgical character but the book contains a variant of the Irish tract of the Mass which is also in the Stowe Missal. An 8th-century manuscript of probably Northumbrian origin, contains selections from the Gospels, collects, hymns, canticles, private devotions, etc. A fragment of seven leaves of an Irish manuscript of the 9th century contains a litany, the Te Deum, and a number of private devotions.

The ultimate origin of the various prayers, etc., found in the fragments of the Irish Rite in the books of private devotion, such as the Book of Cerne, Harley MS 7653, and Royal MS 2 A XX, which are either Irish or have been composed under Irish influence, is still under discussion.

The Turin Fragment and the Antiphonary of Bangor contain for the most part pieces that are either not found elsewhere or are only found in other Irish books.

The Book of Cerne is very eclectic, and pieces therein can also be traced the Gelasian, Gregorian, Gallican, and Hispanic origins, and the Stowe Missal has pieces which are found not only in the Bobbio Missal, but also in the Gelasian, Gregorian, Gallican, Hispanic, and even Ambrosian books.

== Office and liturgy ==
Evidence as to the nature and origin of the Irish office is found in the Rule of St. Columbanus, which gives directions as to the number of psalms to be recited at each hour, in the Turin fragment and the Antiphonary of Bangor, which gives the text of canticles, hymns, collects, and antiphons, in the 8th century tract in Cott. MS. Nero A. II., which gives what was held in the 8th century to be the origin of the "Cursus Scottorum" (Cursus psalmorum and Synaxis are terms used for the Divine Office in the Rule of St. Columbanus) and in allusions in the Catalogus Sanctorum Hiberniae, which differentiates between the Cursus Gallorum, which it derives imaginatively from Ephesus and St. John, through St. Polycarp and St. Irenaeus, and this Cursus Scottorum which, according to this writer, probably an Irish monk in France, originated with St. Mark at Alexandria. With St. Mark it came to Italy. St. Gregory of Nazianzus, St. Basil, and the hermits St. Anthony, St. Paul, St. Macarius, St. John, and St. Malchus used it. St. Cassian, St. Honoratus, and St. Porcarius of Lérins, St. Caesarius of Arles, St. Germanus, and St. Lupus also used it, and St. Germanus taught it to St. Patrick, who brought it to Ireland. There Wandilochus Senex and Gomorillus (Comgall) used it and St. Wandilochus and Columbanus brought it to Luxeuil. The part of the story from St. Germanus onwards may possibly be founded in fact. The other part is not so probable as it does not follow that what St. Columbanus carried to Gaul was the same as that which St. Patrick had brought from Gaul in an earlier age.

=== The Mass ===
The Bobbio and Stowe Missals contain the Irish ordinary of a daily Mass in its late Romanized form. Many of the variables are found in the Bobbio book and portions of some Masses are in the Carlsruhe and Piacenza fragments besides which a little information is found in the St. Gall fragments, the Bangor Antiphonary, the order for the communion of the sick in the Books of Dimma, Mulling, and Deer, the tract in Irish at the end of the Stowe Missal and its variant in the Leabhar Breac.

The Bobbio book is a complete missal, for the priest only, with Masses for holy days through the year. The Stowe Missal gives three differing forms, a fragmentary original of the 9th century, the correction by Moelcaich and the Mass described in the Irish tract. The pieces said by the people are in several cases only indicated by beginnings and endings. The original Stowe Mass approaches nearer to that of Bobbio than the revised form does.

Moelcaich's version is a mixed Mass, Gelasian, Roman or Romano-Ambrosian for the most part, with much of a Hispano-Gallican type underlying it, and perhaps some indigenous details. It is evident that Roman additions or substitutions were recognized as such.

In the Bobbio book the Masses throughout the year seem to be Gallican in arrangement up to the Preface and Gelasian Roman afterwards. They contain at their fullest, besides Epistle, Gospel and sometimes a lesson from the Old Testament or the Apocalypse (the Prophetia of the Ambrosian Rite), the following variables:

1. Collects, sometimes called Post Prophetiam, sometimes not named.
2. Bidding prayer, sometimes called by its Gallican name, Praefatio. This is followed by one or more collects.
3. Collect post nomina.
4. Collect Ad Pacem.
5. Sometimes secreta, but whenever this title is used the Mass is wholly Roman and has no Praefatio, Post nomina or Ad Pacem, but only one collect preceding it.
6. Contestatio, in one case called "immolatio missae". This is the Praefatio in the Roman sense.

Here the Mass ends, with apparently no variable post-communion, though these are given in the three masses in the Stowe. The Masses are: three for Advent; Christmas Eve and Day; St. Stephen; Holy Innocents; Sts. James and John; Circumcision; Epiphany; St. Peter's Chair; St. Mary; the Assumption (this and St. Peter's Chair are given in the Martyrology of Oengus on 18 Jan., evidently its place here); five for Lent; In symboli traditione; Maundy Thursday; Easter Eve and Day; two Paschal Masses; Invention of the Cross; Litany days; Ascension; Pentecost (called in Quinquaginsimo); St. John Baptist; in S. Johannis passione; Sts. Peter and Paul; St. Sigismund; Martyrs; one Martyr; one Confessor; St. Martin; one Virgin; for the Sick; Dedication; St. Michael; for travellers; for the priest himself; Missa omnimoda; four votive Masses; for the Living and the Dead; in domo cujuslibet; seven Sunday Masses; for the king; two daily Masses; for a dead priest; for the Dead—sixty-one in all.

The Mass in symboli traditione includes the traditio and expositio symboli, that for Maundy Thursday is followed by the Good Friday Lectio Passionis, and the Easter Eve Mass is preceded by preces and intercessory orationes similar to those now used on Good Friday, by the benedictio cerei (for which a hymn and a prayer occur in the Bangor Antiphonary), here only represented by Exultet, and by the order of baptism.

=== Hours and psalms ===
The Rule of St. Columbanus and the Bangor book distinguish eight Hours;

1. Ad duodecimam (Vespers, called ad Vespertinam and ad Vesperam in the Bangor book, Adamnan's Life of St. Columba calls it once (iii,23) Vespertinalis missa)
2. Ad initium noctis (Compline)
3. Ad nocturnam or ad medium noctis
4. Ad matutinam (Lauds)
5. Ad secundam (Prime)
6. Ad tertiam
7. Ad sextam
8. Ad nonam

At the four lesser Hours St. Columanus orders three psalms each; at Vespers, ad initium noctis, and ad medium noctis twelve each, and ad matutinam, a very curious and intricate arrangement of psalmody varying in length with the longer and shorter nights. On Saturdays and Sundays from 1 November to 25 March, seventy-five psalms were recited on each day, under one antiphon for every three psalms. From 25 March to 24 June these were diminished by three psalms weekly to a minimum of thirty-six psalms. It would seem, though it does not say so, that the minimum was used for about five weeks, for a gradual increase of the same amount arrives at the maximum by 1 November. On other days of the week there was a maximum of thirty-six and a minimum of twenty-four.

The Rule does not say how the psalter was distributed. Based on the Bangor book and the practices in other rites, the 1913 Catholic Encyclopedia speculates that the Laudate psalms (cxlvii-cl) were likely said together at Lauds, and that Domine, Refugium (Ps. lxxxix) was said ad secundam. Adamnan mentions that St. Columba sang Ps. xliv, Eructavit cor meum, at vespers on one occasion. The psalms at the lesser Hours were to be accompanied by a number of intercessory versicles. In the Bangor book these, somewhat expanded from the list in the Rule, but certainly to be identified with them, are given in the form of one, two, or three antiphons and a collect for each intercession.

=== Baptism service ===
There are two Irish orders of baptism extant: one in the 7th-century Bobbio Missal and one in the 9th-century part of the Stowe Missal. They differ considerably in the order of ceremony, though they have a good deal of their actual wording in common. Both the Stowe and the Bobbio have the Gallican washing of the feet after baptism, with words very similar to those in the "Gothicum" and "Vetus Gallicanum".

The Stowe is the longest of any early form and on the whole has most in common with the Gelasian and Gregorian. In some of its details it has the appearance of a rather unskilful combination of two orders, for the exorcism, renunciation and confession of faith come twice over. The long Blessing of the Font and Baptismal Water is a combination of the Gelasian and Gregorian forms.

The actual formula of baptism is not given in the Stowe, but in the Bobbio it reads: "Baptizo te in nomine Patris et Filii et Spiritus Sancti unam habentem [sic] substantiam ut habeas vitam aeternam partem cum sanctis." ("I baptise you in the name of the father and son and holy spirit, having one substance, that you share life eternal with the saints") This form resembles those in the "Missale Gothicum", the "Vetus Gallicanum" and the 11th-century Mozarabic "Liber Ordinum" in adding "ut habeas vitam aeternam", though all differ in other additions.

==== Bobbio form ====
- "Ad Christianum faciendum" (a) First Exorcism (b) Signum Crucis (c) Insufflation
- Blessing of Font. (a) Exorcism of water. (b) Two collects. (c) Sursum Corda and preface. (d) Chrismation at font
- Second Exorcism: "Exorcidio te spiritus imunde"
- "Ephpheta". The form is "Effeta, effecta est hostia in odorem suavitatis". Cf. the Stowe form
- Unction with oil of catechumens on nose, ears, and breast. The form is "Ungo te oleo sanctificato sicut unxit Samuel David in regem et prophetam"
- Renunciation. The three renunciations of the Stowe (and general Roman) form, combined under one answer
- Confession of faith, with full creed
- Baptism
- Chrismation, with which is said the form "Deus D. N. J. C. qui te regeneravit", etc.
- Vesting with white robe
- Washing the feet
- "Post Baptism", two collects

==== Stowe form ====
- Exorcism and Signum Crucis (sign of the cross). Three prayers. The first is in Moelcaich's hand and includes the signing, the second occurs also in the Bangor Antiphoner as "Collectio super hominem qui habet diabolum" (collect upon man, who has the devil) and the third "Deus qui ad salutem" is repeated before the Blessing of the Font.
- Consecratio salis (consecration of salt) with an exorcism from the Gelasian
- Renunciation - three separate answers
- Confession of faith - the creed in its shortest possible form, a simple profession of faith in each person of the trinity
- Insufflation without words
- First unction on breast and back with oil and chrism, saying "Ungo te oleo sanctificatio in nomine" ("I anoint you with sanctified oil in the name...") etc.
- Second renunciation in the same words as before
- Four prayers of exorcism, two Gelasian and two Gregorian
- Irish rubric "It is here that salt is put into the mouth of the child."
- "Ephpheta" - the form is: "Effeta quot est apertio effeta est hostia in honorem [sic] suavitatis in nomine" etc. The Gelasian and Gregorian (like the modern Roman) have, "Effeta quod est adaperire in odorem suavitatis, tu autem effugare Diabole, appropinquabit enim judicium Dei". The play upon the words effeta and effecta is peculiar to the Bobbio and Stowe. In other books "Ephpheta" is not associated with the giving of the salt, as it appears to be here, but with the touching of the nose and ears with spittle.
- Prayer - "Domine sancte pater omnipotens aeterne deus, qui es et qui eras et qui venturus es" ("Lord, holy father, omnipotent eternal god, you who are and who was and who are to come"). This occurs in the Gelasian as "Ad catechumenum ex Pagano faciendum" ("for making a convert out of a pagan"), and is said in the present Roman baptism of adults before the giving of the salt in the case of converts from paganism.
- Prayer - "Deus qui ad salutem humani generis" ("Lord, who for the health of human kind"). This, which forms part of the blessing of water in the Gelasian, Gregorian, and modern Roman, is repeated here for the second time, having been said already with the first exorcism.
- Prayer - "Exaudi nos Domine......et mittere dignare" ("Hear us, lord"). The prayer used at the "Asperges" in the modern Roman rite.
- Second unction - "Huc usque catechumenus. Incipit oleari oleo et crismate in pectus et item scapulas antequam baptizaretur."
- Litany "circa fontem canitur" ("Sung around the font") - No text is given. In the Ambrosian rite the Litany is said after the Baptism, and in the modern Roman on Easter Eve after the blessing of the font.
- Two psalms (or rather verses of two psalms) - "Sitvit anima mea usque vivum, quemadmodum. Vox Domini super aquas multas. Adferte." This is a way of expressing Ps. xli, 2 and Ps. xxviii, 3. The whole of Ps. xli is said in the Ambrosian, and Ps. xxviii in the Roman baptism of adults.
- Blessing of the font - the first part consists of exorcisms which, though they occur in various parts of the existing Gelasian books, are always connected with blessing the font or the water therein. The last part consists, with a few variations, of the prayer "Omnipotens sempiterne Deus, adesto magnae pietatis tuae mysteriis" along with the preface and prayers that follow in the Gelasian, Gregorian, and modern Roman Easter Eve ceremonies, down to the pouring of chrism into the font. The direction which follows orders the chrism to be poured "in modum crucis" - "et quique voluerit implet vasculum aqua benedictionis ad domos consecrandas et populus praesens aspergitur aqua benedicta".
- Confession of faith repeated in a slightly amplified form.
- The Baptism - a triple immersion or aspersion is ordered but no formula is given.
- The Chrismation - anointing with oil "in cerebrum in fronte" ("upon the forehead"). The prayer is "Deus omnipotens Pater D.N.J.C. qui te regeneravit" etc. as found in the Gelasian, Gregorian, modern Roman and Ambrosian, the Bobbio and "Vetus Gallicanum". The formula is "Ungo te de oleo et de Chrismate salutis et sanctificationis in nomine.... nunc et per omnia in saecula saeculorum", and "operare creatura olei operare in nomine"....
- Vesting with white robe by the deacon, with the usual words (said by the priest), "Accipe vestem candidam" ("accept the white vesture") etc.
- Signing of the hands - the priest says "Aperiatur manus pueri" and "Signum crucis Christi accipe in manum tuam dexteram et conservet te in vitam aeternam". Warren finds an instance of this ceremony in the 11th-century Jumièges Ritual, but otherwise it does not seem to be known.
- Washing of feet - this ceremony is peculiarly Gallican and Irish and is not found in Roman books. An order was made in Iberia by the Council of Elvira in 305 that it should be performed by clerks, not priests. The Stowe form begins with verses from the Psalms, "Lucerna pedibus" and others, with Alleluias. Then follow a formula and a prayer, both referring to Christ washing the feet of his disciples.
- Communion - "Corpus et sanguinis [sic] D.N.J.C. sit tibi in vitam aeternam, followed by thanksgivings for communion and baptism. At the end are a blessing of water (found also in the Gregorian) and an exorcism (found also in Gallican and Ambrosian books and in a slightly varied form, in the 11th-century Mozarabic Liber Ordinum). These, if they belong to the baptism, are clearly out of place, rendered unnecessary, as Warren suggests, by the introduction of the larger Roman blessing of the font. It is possible, however, that they belong to the office of the visitation of the sick, which follows immediately without any break in the manuscript, since that service in the Book of Mulling has a blessing of water at the beginning.

=== Visitation, unction, and communion of the sick ===
There are four extant specimens of these services: in the Stowe Missal and the Book of Dimma are the longest and most complete, and agree very closely. The Mulling differs in the preliminary bidding prayers and in beginning with blessings of water and of the sick person, the latter of which comes at the end and in a different form in the Stowe and Dimma, though it agrees with the Dimma in inserting the creed, which is not in the Stowe. The Deer form has only the communion, which agrees substantially with the other three. The order in the Stowe is:

- Blessing of water - "Benedic, Domine, hanc creaturam aquae" ("Bless, O Lord, this creature water") (Gregorian) and "Exorcizo te spiritus immunde" ("I exorcise thee, O unclean spirit") (found in the Bobbio Baptismal Order before the "Ephpheta" and in an Ambrosian Order quoted by Martène, but in both as an "exorcismus hominis", exorcism of [sick] person). These two are considered by Warren to belong to the Baptismal Order, but cf. the position of the "Benedictio super aquam" and "Benedictio hominis" in the Book of Mulling.
- Preface - in the Gallican sense, "Oremus fratres, Dominum Deum nostrum pro fratre nostro" ("Let us pray, brothers, to the Lord our God for our brother", i.e., the sick person), followed by six collects, all but one of which, as well as the Praefatio, are in the Dimma.
- Two Gospels. Matt., xxii, 23, 29–33, and xxiv, 29–31. The first is in the Dimma, where there is also an Epistle, I Cor., xv, 19–22.
- Unction. In the Dimma this is preceded by a declaration of faith in the trinity, eternal life and the resurrection. In the Mulling the creed follows the unction. The form is "ungo te de oleo sanctificato ut salveris in nomine ... in saecula" ("I anoint thee with the oil of sanctification that thou mayest be saved, in the Name of the Father ... for ever") etc. The Dimma is "Ungo te de oleo sanctificato in nomine Trinitatis ut salveris in saecula saeculorum" ("I anoint thee with the oil of sanctification in the name of the trinity that thou mayest be saved for ever and ever"), and the Mulling "Ungo te de oleo sanctificationis in nomine dei patris et filii et spiritus sancti ut salveris in nomine sancti trinitatis" ("I anoint thee with the oil of sanctification in the name of God the father and the son and the holy spirit that thou mayest be saved in the name of the holy trinity"). The forms in the old Ambrosian Rituals and in the pre-Tridentine rite of the Venetian patriarchate began with "Ungo te oleo sanctificato". A very similar form is given by Martene from a 12th-century Monte Cassino Breviary (Vol. IV, 241), and another is in the 10th-century Asti ritual described by Gastoue (Rassegna Gregoriana, 1903). The Roman and modern Ambrosian forms begin with "Per istam unctionem" ("Through this anointing"). Nothing is said in the Celtic books about the parts of the body to be anointed.
- The Lord's Prayer - with introduction "Concede Domine nobis famulis tuis" and embolism "libera nos Domine". The Dimma has the same introduction but after the prayer the sick person is directed to recite "Agnosce, Domine, verba quae precepisti". As another, or perhaps an alternative, introduction to the prayer, The Mulling and Deer have "Creator naturarum omnium". In each case the Pater Noster and its accompaniments are preliminary to the Communion.
- Three prayers for the sick man, referring to his Communion - these are not in the Dimma, Mulling, or Deer. One of these, "Domine sancte Pater te fideliter", is in the present Roman ritual.
- Pax - "Pax et caritas D.N.J.C." ("The peace and love of our Lord Jesus Christ"), etc. as in the Mass.
- Communion. The words of administration as given in the Stowe are "Corpus et sanguis D.N.J.C. fili Dei vivi altissimi, et reliqua" ("The body and blood of our Lord Jesus Christ, the Son of the living most high God, and the remains"). The Dimma omits "altissimi" (most high) and ends "conservat animam tuam in vitam aeternam" ("preserve thy soul unto eternal life"). The Mulling has "Corpus cum sanguine D. N. J. C. sanitas sit tibi in vitam aeternam" ("The body and blood of our Lord Jesus Christ be health to thee unto eternal life"). The Deer has the same, except that it ends "in vitam perpetuam et salutem" ("unto perpetual life and health"). Then follow Communion anthems similar to those in the Mass, differing in order and selection in the Stowe Mass, the Stowe, Dimma, Mulling, and Deer communions of the sick and in the Antiphonary of Bangor, though several are common to them all.
- Thanksgiving - "Deus tibi gratias agimus" ("God, we give thee thanks"). This is found in the Dimma, Mulling, and Deer forms, where it ends the service. In the Dimma it is preceded by the blessing.
- Blessing - "Benedicat tibi Dominus et custodiat te" "("The Lord bless thee and keep thee"), followed by the signing of the cross and "pax tibi in vitam aeternam" ("Peace to thee in eternal life").

=== Consecration of churches ===
In the Leabhar Breac there is a tract describing the consecration of a church, a ceremony divided into five parts; consecration of the floor, of the altar with its furniture, consecration out of doors, aspersion inside and aspersion outside. The consecration of the floor includes writing two alphabets thereon. There are directed to be seven crosses cut on the altar, and nothing is said about relics.

On the whole the service appears to be of the same type as the Roman though it differs in details and, if the order of the component parts as given in the tract may be taken as correct, in order also.
