= Gallican Rite =

Historical form of Christian liturgy

The Gallican Rite is a historical form of Christian liturgy and other ritual practices in Western Christianity. It is not a single liturgical rite but rather several Latin liturgical rites that developed within the Latin Church, which comprised the majority use of most of Western Christianity for the greater part of the 1st millennium AD. The rites first developed in the early centuries as the Syriac-Greek rites of Jerusalem and Antioch and were first translated into Latin in various parts of the Western Roman Empire Praetorian prefecture of Gaul. By the 5th century, it was well established in the Roman civil diocese of Gaul, which had a few early centers of Christianity in the south. Ireland is also known to have had a form of this Gallican Liturgy mixed with Celtic customs.

== History and origin ==
The Gallican Rite was used from before the 5th century, and likely prior to the Diocletian reform in AD 293 Roman Gaul, until the middle or end of the 8th century. There is no information before the 5th century and very little then; and throughout the whole period there was, to judge by existing documents and descriptions, so much diversity that, though the general outlines of the rite were of the same pattern, the name must not be taken to imply more than a very moderate amount of homogeneity. The Rite of Iberia was used from the 5th century in Roman provinces within the Roman civil diocese of Hispania to the end of the 11th century, and lingered as an archaeological survival in chapels at Toledo and Salamanca. It was so nearly allied to the Gallican Rite that the term Hispano-Gallican is often applied to the two. But the Iberian Mozarabic Rite has, like the allied Celtic Rite, enough of an independent history to require separate treatment, so that though it will be necessary to allude to both by way of illustration, this article will be devoted primarily to the rite once used in what is now France. Of the origin of the Gallican Rite there are three principal theories, between two of which the controversy is not yet settled. These theories may be termed: the Ephesine, the Ambrosian, and the Roman.

=== Ephesine theory ===
The Ephesine theory, first put forward by William Palmer in Origines Liturgicae, was once very popular among Anglican scholars. According to it the Gallican Rite went back to one brought to Lyon from Ephesus by St. Pothinus and Irenaeus, who had received it through Polycarp from John of Patmos. The idea originated partly in a statement in the 8th-century tract in a manuscript, which refers the Service of the Gauls (Cursus Gallorum) to such an origin, and partly in a statement of Colmán of Lindisfarne at the Synod of Whitby (664) respecting the Johannine origin of the Quartodeciman Easter. This theory "may be dismissed as practically disproved," according to Henry Jenner, in Catholic Encyclopedia.

=== Ambrosian theory ===
The second theory is that which Louis Duchesne puts forward in place of the Ephesine. He holds that Milan, not Lugdunum (Lyon), was the principal centre of Gallican development. He lays great stress on the incontestable importance of Mediolanum (Milan) as the capital of the Western Roman Empire from 286 to 402 and of the Church of Milan in the late 4th century, and conjectures that a liturgy of Oriental origin, introduced perhaps by Auxentius the Arian bishop of Milan from 355 to 374, spread from the capital city, Mediolanum, to the Roman provinces in Gaul, Hispania, and Britannia. Duchesne points out that "the Gallican Liturgy in the features which distinguish it from the Roman, betrays all the characteristics of the Eastern Orthodox liturgies," and that "some of its formularies are to be found word for word in the Greek Orthodox texts which were in use in the Churches of the Syro-Byzantine Rite either in the fourth century or somewhat later," and infers from this that, "the Gallican Liturgy is an Oriental liturgy, introduced into the West towards the middle of the fourth century." Duchesne does not, however, note that in certain other important peculiarities the Gallican Liturgy agrees with the Roman where the latter differs from the Oriental. Controverting the third or Roman theory of origin, he stresses that Pope Innocent I (416) in a letter to Decentius, bishop of Gubbio, spoke of usages which Duchesne recognizes as Gallican (e.g. the position of the Diptychs and the Pax) as "foreign importations" and did not recognize in them the ancient usage of his own Church, and he thinks it hard to explain why the African Church should have accepted the Roman reforms, while Ambrose himself a Roman, refused them. He assumes that the Ambrosian Rite is not really Roman, but Gallican, much Romanized at a later period, and that the Gubbio variations of which Innocent I complained were borrowed from Milan.

=== Roman theory ===
The third theory is perhaps rather complicated to state without danger of misrepresentation, and has not been so definitely stated as the other two by any one writer. It is held in part by Milanese liturgists and by many others whose opinion is of weight. In order to state it clearly it will be necessary to point out first certain details in which all the Latin liturgical rites agree with one another in differing from the Eastern, and in this we speak only of the Mass, which is of far more importance than either the canonical hours or the occasional services in determining origins.

==== Invariability of the Priest's part ====
The Eastern Eucharists of whatever rite are marked by the invariability of the priest's part. There are, it is true, alternative anaphoras which are used either ad libitum, as in the Syro-Jacobite Rite, or on certain days, as in Byzantine and East Syrian, but they are complete in themselves and do not contain passages appropriate to the day. The lections of course vary with the day in all rites, and varying antiphons, troparia, etc., are sung by the choir; but the priest's part remains fixed.

In the Western rites – whether Hispano-Gallican, Ambrosian, or Roman – a very large proportion of the priest's part varies according to the day, and these variations are so numerous in the Gallican Rite that the fixed part, even of the Prayer of the Consecration, is strangely little. Certain varying prayers of the Hispano-Gallican Rite have a tendency to fall into couples, a Bidding Prayer, or invitation to pray, sometimes of considerable length and often partaking of the nature of a homily, addressed to the congregation, and a collect embodying the suggestions of the Bidding Prayer, addressed to God. These Bidding Prayers have survived in the Roman Rite in the Good Friday intercessory prayers, and they occur in a form borrowed later from the Gallican in the ordination services, but in general the invitation to prayer is reduced to its lowest terms in the word Oremus.

==== The Institution ====
Another Western peculiarity is in the form of the Words of Institution. The principal Eastern liturgies follow Paul the Apostle's words in the First Epistle to the Corinthians (11:23–25) and date the Institution by the betrayal, and of the less important anaphoras, most either use the same expression or paraphrase it. The Western liturgies date from the Passion, Qui pridie quam pateretur, for which, though of course the fact is found there, there is no verbal Scriptural warrant. The Mozarabic of today uses the Pauline words, and no Gallican Recital of the Institution remains in full; but in both the prayer that follows is called (with alternative nomenclature in the Gallican) post-Pridie and the catchwords "Qui pridie" come at the end of the post-Sanctus in the Gallican Masses, so that it is clear that this form existed in both.

These variations from the Eastern usages are of an early date, and it is inferred from them, and from other considerations more historical than liturgical, that a liturgy with these peculiarities was the common property of Gaul, Hispania, and Italy. Whether, as is most likely, it originated in Rome and spread thence to the countries under direct Roman influence, or whether it originated elsewhere and was adopted by Rome, there is no means of knowing. The adoption must have happened when liturgies were in rather a fluid state. The Gallicans may have carried to an extreme the changes begun at Rome, and may have retained some archaic features which had been later dropped by Rome. During the 4th century – it has been conjectured that it was in the papacy of Pope Damasus I (366–384) – liturgical reforms were made at Rome: the position of the Great Intercession and of the Pax were altered, the latter perhaps because the form of the dismissal of the catechumens was disused, and the distinction between the first part, the Mass of the Catechumens, and second part, the Mass of the Faithful, was no longer needed, and therefore the want was felt of a position with some meaning to it for the sign of Christian unity. The long and diffuse prayers were made into the short and crisp collects of the Roman type. It was then that the variable post-Sanctus and post-Pridie were altered into a fixed Canon of a type similar to the Roman Canon of today, though perhaps this Canon began with the clause which now reads "Quam oblationem", but according to the pseudo-Ambrosian tract De Sacramentis once read "Fac nobis hanc oblationem". This may have been introduced by a short, variable post-Sanctus. This reform, possibly through the influence of Ambrose, was adopted at Milan, but not in Gaul and Hispania. At a still later period, during the 5th and 6th centuries, changes were again made at Rome, principally attributed to Pope Leo I, Pope Gelasius I, and Pope Gregory I; these three popes are the eponyms of three varying sacramentaries. These later reforms were not adopted at Milan which retained the books of the first reform, which are now known as Ambrosian.

=== Summary of origins ===
The Latin liturgical rites have been described as undergoing three phases, which may be called for want of better names the Gallican, the Ambrosian, and the Roman stages. The holders of the theory no doubt recognize that the demarcation between these stages is rather vague, and that the alterations were in many respects gradual. Of the three theories of origin, the Ephesine may be dismissed as practically disproved. To both of the other two the same objection may be urged, that they are largely founded on conjecture and on the critical examination of documents of a much later date than the periods to which the conjectures relate. But at present there is little else to go upon. It may be well to mention also a theory put forward by W. C. Bishop in Church Quarterly for July 1908, to the effect that the Gallican Liturgy was not introduced into Gaul from anywhere but was the original liturgy of that country, apparently invented and developed there. He speaks of an original independence of Rome (of course liturgically only) followed by later borrowings. This does not seem to exclude the idea that Rome and the West may have had the germ of the Western Rite in common. Again the theory is conjectural and is only very slightly stated in the article.

=== Later history ===
The later history of the Gallican rite is obscure and filled with liturgical anarchy. France had no clear capital; Toledo occasionally tried to impose liturgical law, but only over Visigothic areas, and without much success. The Councils of Vannes (465), Agde (506), Vaison (529), Tours (567), Auxerre (578), and Mâcon (581, 623) made attempts at imposing liturgical consistency, but only at a local level. In the 7th century, Columbanus's missionaries likely introduced Irish elements to the rite.

Throughout this period, there was a slow process of Romanization in the Gallican rite, accelerated in the 8th century by Boniface. Nearly all the Gallican books of the later Merovingian period, which are all that are left, contain many Roman elements. The 1913 Catholic Encyclopedia speculates that some of these represent originally Gallican liturgies with Roman elements introduced, while evaluating others, such as the Gelasian Sacramentary and the Missale Francorum, as Roman liturgies with Gallican additions and adaptations.

The Roman Liturgy was adopted at Metz in the time of Chrodegang (742–66). The Roman chant was introduced about 760, and by a decree of Pepin of Herstal, Mayor of the Palace, quoted in Charlemagne's Admonitio generalis in 789, the Gallican chant was abolished in its favour. Pope Hadrian I between 784 and 791 sent to Charlemagne at his own request a copy of what was considered to be the Gregorian Sacramentary, but which certainly represented the Roman use of the end of the 8th century. This book, which was far from complete, was edited and supplemented by the addition of a large amount of matter derived from the Gallican books and from the Roman book known as the Gelasian Sacramentary, which had been gradually supplanting the Gallican. It is probable that the editor was Alcuin of York, Charlemagne's principal liturgical advisor. Copies were distributed throughout Charlemagne's empire, and this "composite liturgy", as Duchesne describes, "from its source in the Imperial chapel spread throughout all the churches of the Frankish Empire and at length, finding its way to Rome gradually supplanted there the ancient use." More than half a century later, when Charles the Bald wished to see what the ancient Gallican Rite had been like, it was necessary to import Hispanic priests to celebrate it in his presence. A French variant of the Roman rite introduced in the Kingdom of Sicily by the Normans was also known as the "Gallican Rite", but it has little relation to the historic rite of the same name.

=== Other uses of the name Gallican ===
The name Gallican has also been applied to two other uses:

- a French use introduced by the Normans into Apulia and Sicily. This was only a variant of the Roman Rite.
- the reformed Breviaries of the French dioceses in the 17th to mid-19th centuries. These have nothing to do with the ancient Gallican Rite.

== Manuscripts and other sources ==
There are no manuscripts of the Gallican Rite earlier than the later part of the 7th century, though the descriptions in the letters of Germain of Paris (555–76) take one back another century. The known manuscripts are:

=== Reichenau Fragments ===
The Reichenau Fragments are described in Léopold Victor Delisle's Mémoire sur d'anciens Sacramentaires. They were discovered by Franz Mone in 1850 in a palimpsest manuscript from the Abbey of Reichenau, in the library of Karlsruhe. The manuscript, which is late 7th century, had belonged to John II, Bishop of Constance (760–781). It contains eleven Masses of purely Gallican type, one of which is a Mass for the feast of Germanus of Auxerre, but the others do not specify any festival. One Mass is written entirely in hexameter verse, except for the post-Pridie which is prose.

=== Peyron, Mai, and Bunsen Fragments ===
The Peyron, Mai, and Bunsen fragments are disjointed palimpsest leaves. Those fragments which are eponyms of Cardinal Angelo Mai and Amedeo Peyron were found in the Biblioteca Ambrosiana at Milan, (Note: Peyron believed the fragment was written in the 7th century and Hammond suspected that the Peyron fragment was from the same manuscript as the Mai fragment; nevertheless, according to Hammond, the fragments belong to the Gallican type liturgies classification.) and those fragments which are an eponym of Christian Charles Josias von Bunsen were found at the Abbey of Saint Gall. (Note: The Bunsen fragments belong to the Gallican type liturgies classification, according to Hammond.) The Peyron fragment contains part of what looks like a Lenten Contestatio (Preface) with other prayers of Gallican type. The Bunsen fragment contains part of a Mass for the Dead (post-Sanctus, post-Pridie) and several pairs of Bidding Prayers and Collects, the former having the title "Exhortatio" or "Exhortatio Matutina". The Mai fragments begin with part of a Bidding Prayer and contain a fragment of a Contestatio, with that title, and fragments of other prayers, two of which have the title "Post Nomina", and two others which seem to be prayers ad Pacem.

=== Missale Gallicanum Vetus ===
The Missale Gallicanum Vetus (Gallicanum), described by Delisle, is a manuscript dating from the end of the 7th, or the early part of the 8th. Only a fragment, it begins with a Mass for the feast of Germanus of Auxerre, after which come prayers for the Blessing of Virgins and Widows, two Advent Masses, the Christmas Eve Mass, the expositio symboli and traditio symboli and other ceremonies preparatory to Baptism; also the Maundy Thursday, Good Friday and Easter Sunday ceremonies and the baptismal service, Masses for the Sundays after Easter up to the Rogation Mass, where the manuscript breaks off. Masses, as in Gothicum, are Gallican in order with many Roman prayers. The Good Friday prayers are, with a few verbal variations, exactly as those in the Roman Missal.

=== Missale Gothicum ===
Missale Gothicum (Gothicum), described by Delisle, is a manuscript dating from the end of the 7th century and once belonging to the Petau Library. The name is due to a 15th-century note at the beginning of the book, and hence it has been attributed by Tommasi and Jean Mabillon to Narbonne, which was in the Visigothic Kingdom. Duchesne, judging by the inclusion of Masses for the feast of Symphorian and the feast of Leodegar (d. 680), attributes it to Autun. Masses are numbered, the manuscript beginning with Christmas Eve which is numbered III. Probably there were once two Advent Masses, as in Gallicanum. There are eighty-one numbered sections, of which the last is the first prayer of "Missa Romensiſ cottidiana", with which the manuscript breaks off. The details of Masses in this book are given in the section of the present article on the liturgical year. Masses are all Gallican as to order, but many of the actual prayers are Roman.

=== Luxeuil Lectionary ===
The Luxeuil Lectionary (Luxeuil) is a 7th-century manuscript discovered by Mabillon in the Abbey of Luxeuil, but because among its very few saints' days it contains the feast of Saint Genevieve, Germain Morin, it has been attributed to Paris. It contains the Prophetical Lessons, epistles, and Gospels for the year from Christmas Eve onwards. At the end are the lessons of a few special Masses, for the burial of a bishop, for the dedication of a church, when a bishop preaches, "et plebs decimas reddat", when a deacon is ordained, when a priest is blessed, "in profectione itineris", and "lectiones cotidianae". This lectionary is purely Gallican with no apparent Roman influence. The manuscript has not been printed in its entirety, but Mabillon, in De Liturgia Gallicana, gives references to all the lessons and the beginnings and endings of the text.

=== Letters of Pseudo-Germanus of Paris ===
The Letters of St. Germanus of Paris are from a manuscript at Autun. Duchesne says of the descriptions, on which the interpretations are based, that "We may reconstruct from the letters a kind of Ordo Gallicanus".

There now seems to be a scholarly consensus that these letters were written in the eighth to ninth centuries

=== Celtic books ===
Much side light is thrown on the Gallican Rite by the Celtic books, especially by the Stowe Missal and Bobbio Missal. A comparison with the Ambrosian Liturgy and Rite may also be of service, while most lacunae in our knowledge of the Gallican Rite may reasonably be conjecturally filled up from the Mozarabic books, which even in their present form are those of substantially the same rite. There are also liturgical allusions in certain 5th and 6th century writers: Hilary of Poitiers, Sulpicius Severus, Caesarius of Arles, and especially Gregory of Tours, and some information may be gathered from the decrees of the Gallican councils mentioned above.

The above are all that exist as directly Gallican sources, but much information may also be gleaned from the books of the transition period, which, though substantially Roman, were much edited with Germanic tendencies and contained a large amount which was of a Gallican rather than a Roman type. The principal of these are as follows.

=== Gelasian Sacramentary ===
There are three extant manuscripts of the Gelasian Sacramentary, one at Vatican City, one at Zürich, and one at the Abbey of Saint Gall. The manuscripts are of the early 8th century. The groundwork is Roman, with Gallican additions and modifications. Evidence for the Gallican rites of ordination and some other matters is derived from this book.

=== Missale Francorum ===
The Missale Francorum (Vat. Reg. Lat. 257) is a fragment of a sacramentary similar to the Gelasian Sacramentary, though not identical with it.

=== Gregorian Sacramentary ===
There are many manuscripts of the Gregorian Sacramentary. It represents the sacramentary sent by Adrian I to Charlemagne, after it had been rearranged and supplemented by Gelasian and Gallican editions in France.

== The Liturgical Year ==
The Luxeuil Lectionary, Missale Gothicum and Missale Gallicum, and the Gallican adaptations of the Martyrologium Hieronymianum are the chief authorities on this point, and to these may be added some information to be gathered from the regulations of the Council of Agde (506), Fourth Council of Orléans (541), Council of Tours (567), and Second Council of Mâcon (581), and from Gregory of Tours' Historia Francorum, as to the Gallican practice in the 6th century.

It is probable that there were many variations in different times and places, and that the influence of the Martyrologium Hieronymianum brought about gradual assimilation to Rome. The year, as is usual, began with Advent. The Council of Mâcon arranged three fasting days a week during Advent and mentioned St. Martin's Day as the key-day for Advent Sunday, so that, as at present in the Mozarabic and Ambrosian Rites, there were six Sundays of Advent (but only two Advent Masses survive in Gallicanum). Gothicum and the Luxeuil Lectionary both begin with Christmas Eve. (Note: For a list of liturgical year variations in Gallicum, Gothicum, and Luxeuil, see Jenner (1909).)

Both books also have Commons of Martyrs and Confessors, the Luxeuil has Commons of bishops and deacons for a number of other Masses, and Gothicum has six Sunday Masses. Gallicanum has a Mass for the feast of Germanus of Auxerre before the two Advent Masses. In both Gothicum and Gallicanum a large space is given to the services of the two days before Easter, and in the latter the expositio symboli and traditio symboli are given at great length. The moveable feasts depended, of course, on Easter. When the Roman Church altered the Easter computation from the old 84-year-cycle to the new Victorius Aquitaine 532-year-cycle in 457, the Gallican Church, unlike the Celts, did the same; but when, in 525, the Roman Church adopted the Dionysius Exiguus 19-year-cycle, the Gallican Church continued to use the 532-year-cycle, until the end of the 8th or beginning of the 9th century. Lent began with the first Sunday, not with Ash Wednesday. There is a not very intelligible passage in the canons of the Council of Tours to the effect that all through August there were "festivitates et missae sanctorum", but this is not borne out by the existing sacramentaries or the Lectionary.

== The Divine Office ==
There is curiously little information on this point, and it is not possible to reconstruct the Gallican Divine Office from the scant allusions that exist. It seems probable that there was considerable diversity in various times and places, though councils, both in Gaul and Hispania, tried to bring about some uniformity. The principal authorities are the Councils of Agde (506) and Tours (567) and allusions in the writings of Gregory of Tours and Caesarius of Arles. The general arrangement and nomenclature were very similar to those of the Celtic Rite. There were two principal services, Matins and Vespers; and four Lesser Hours, Prime, or ad Secundum, Terce, Sext, and None; and probably two night services, Complin, or ad initium noctis, and Nocturns.

But the application of these names is sometimes obscure. It is not quite clear whether Nocturns and Lauds were not joined together as Matins; Caesarius speaks of Prima, while Gallicanum speaks of ad Secundum; Caesarius distinguishes between Lucernarium and ad Duodeciman, while Aurelian distinguishes between ad Duodeciman and Complin; Gothicum speaks of Vespera Paschae and Initium Noctis Paschae, and Gallicanum has ad Duodeciman Paschae. The distribution of the Psalter is not known. The Council of Tours orders six psalms at Sext and twelve ad Duodecimam, with Alleluia (presumably as Antiphon). For Matins there is a curious arrangement which reminds one of that in the Rule of St. Columbanus. Normally in summer (apparently from Easter to July) "sex antiphonae binis psalmis" are ordered. This evidently means twelve psalms, two under each antiphon. In August there seem to have been no psalms, because there were festivals and Masses of saints. "Toto Augusto manicationes fiant, quia festivitates sunt et missae sanctorum." The meaning of manicationes and of the whole statement is obscure. In September there were fourteen psalms, two under each antiphon; in October twenty-four psalms, three to each antiphon; and from December to Easter thirty psalms, three to each antiphon. Caesarius orders six psalms at Prime with the hymn "Fulgentis auctor aetheris", two lessons, one from the old and one from the New Testament, and a capitellum"; six psalms at Terce, Sext, and None, with an antiphon, a hymn, a lesson, and a capitellum; at Lucernarium a "Psalmus Directaneus", whatever that may be (cf. "Psalmus Directus" of the Ambrosian Rite), two antiphons, a hymn, and a capitellum; and ad Duodecimam, eighteen psalms, an antiphon, hymn, lesson, and capitellum. From this it seems as though the office of Lucernarium and ad Duodecimam made up Vespers, combining the twelfth hour of the Divine Office (that is, of the recitation of the Psalter with its accompaniments) with a service for what, without any intention of levity, one may call "lighting-up time". The Ambrosian and Mozarabic Vespers are constructed on this principle, and so is the Byzantine Hesperinos.

Caesarius mentions a blessing given by the bishop at the end of Lucernarium, "cumque expleto Lucernario benedictionem populo dedisset". The rules of Caesarius and Aurelian both speak of two nocturns with lessons, which include on the feasts of martyrs lessons from their passions. They order Magnificat to be sung at Lauds and during the Paschal days, and Gloria in excelsis Deo sung on Sundays and greater festivals.

There is a short passage which throws a little light upon the Lyon use of the end of the 5th century in an account of the Council of Lyon in 499. The council, assembled by Gundobad, king of Burgundy, began on the feast of Just. The vigil was kept at his tomb. This began with a lesson from the Pentateuch, Exodus 7:3. Then psalms were sung and a lesson was read from the prophets (Isaiah 6:9,), more psalms and a lesson from the Gospels, Matthew 11:21 or Luke 10:13, and a lesson from the Pauline epistles, Romans 2:4.

Agobard, in the 9th century, mentions that at Lyon there were no canticles except from the Psalms, no hymns written by poets, and no lessons except from Scripture. Mabillon says that though in his day Lyon agreed with Rome in many things, especially in the distribution of the Psalter, and admitted lessons from the Acts of the Saints, there were still no hymns except at Complin, and he mentions a similar rule as to hymns at Vienne. But the 767 Council of Tours canon 23 allowed the use of the Ambrosian hymns. Though the Psalter of the second recension of Jerome, now used in all the churches of the Roman Rite except St. Peter's Basilica, Vatican City, is known as the "Gallican", while the older, a revision of the Vetus Itala now used in St. Peter's Basilica only, is known as the "Roman", it does not seem that the Gallican Psalter was used even in Gaul until a comparatively later date, though it spread thence over nearly all the West. At present the Mozarabic and Ambrosian Psalters are variants of the "Roman", with peculiarities of their own. Probably the decadence of the Gallican Divine Office was very gradual. In an 8th-century manuscript tract, the Cursus Gallorum is distinguished from the Cursus Romanorum, the Cursus Scottorum and the Ambrosian, all of which seem to have been going on then. The unknown writer, though his opinion is of no value on the origin of the cursus, may well have known about some of these of his own knowledge; but through the 7th century there are indications of adoption of the Roman or the Monastic cursus instead of the Gallican, or to mix them up, a tendency which was resisted at times by provincial councils.

== The Mass ==
The chief authorities for the Gallican Mass are the letters of Saint Germanus of Paris (555–576), and by a comparison of these with the extant sacramentaries, not only of Gaul but of the Celtic Rite, with the Irish tracts on the Mass, with the books of the still existing Mozarabic Rite, and with the descriptions of the Hispanic Mass given by Isidore of Seville. One may arrive at a fairly clear and general idea of the service, though there exists no Gallican Ordinary of the Mass and no Antiphoner. Duchesne, in Origines du Culte chrétien, gave a very full account constructed on this basis, though some will differ from him in his supplying certain details from Ambrosian books, and in his claiming the Bobbio Missal Sacramentary as Ambrosian rather than Celtic. (Note: For a reconstructed order of a Gallican Mass, see Jenner (1909).)

Jenner's analysis shows that the Gallican Mass contained a very small number of fixed elements and that nearly the whole service was variable according to the day. The absence of an Ordinary of the Mass is, therefore, of less importance than it would be in, for instance, the Roman Mass or the Ambrosian Mass. (Note: For the full list of variables, in the Reichenau fragments, Gothicum, and Germanus's description, see Jenner (1909).) Thus the fixed parts of the service would only be: (a) the three Canticles, (b) the Ajus and Sanctus, etc., at the Gospel, (c) the Prex, (d) the Dismissal, (e) the priest's prayers at the Offertory, (f) the Great Intercession, (g) the Pax formula, (h) the Sursum corda dialogue, (i) the Sanctus, (j) the Recital of the Institution, (k) the Lord's Prayer. Possibly fixed would be the Confractorium, Trecanum, and Communio. and probably fixed would be the priest's devotions at Communion. Most of these are very short and only the most important passage wanting is the one fixed passage in the Prayer of Consecration, the Words of Institution.

== The Occasional Services ==
=== The Baptismal Service ===
The authorities for the Gallican Baptismal Service are Gothicum and Gallicanum, both of which are incomplete, along with a few details in the second Letter of Germanus of Paris. The forms given in the Stowe Missal and the Bobbio Missal are too much Romanized to well illustrate the Gallican Rite. The form given in Gothicum is the least complete. (Note: For the baptismal service in Gothicum, see Jenner (1909).) Gallicanum has a much fuller form with the traditio symboli and expositio symboli, etc. (Note: For the baptismal service in Gallicanum, see Jenner (1909).)

The Holy Week ceremonies which are mixed with the Baptismal service in the two books are not very characteristic. The couplets of invitatory and collect which occur in the Roman Good Friday service are given with verbal variations in Gothicum; in both, however, there are other prayers of a similar type and prayers for some of the Hours of Good Friday and Easter Vigil. The Blessing of the Paschal Candle consists of a Bidding Prayer and collect (in Gothicum only), the Exsultet and its Preface nearly exactly as in the Roman, a Collectio post benedictionem cerei, and Collectio post hymnum cerri. There is no blessing of the new fire in either.

=== Ordination Service ===
The Ordination services of the Gallican Rite do not occur in any of the avowedly Gallican books. They are found in the Gelasian Sacramentary and the Missale Francorum. That is to say, a mixed form which does not agree with the more or less contemporary Roman form in the Leonine and Gregorian Sacramentaries, though it contains some Roman prayers, is found in these two books, and it may reasonably be inferred that the differences are of Gallican origin. Moreover, extracts relating to ceremonial are given with them from the Statuta Ecclesia Antiqua, formerly attributed to the Fourth Council of Carthage, but now known to be a Gallican decree "promulgated in the province of Arles towards the end of the 5th century" (Duchesne).

The ceremonial contained therein agrees with that described in De Officiis Ecclesiasticis by Isidore of Seville. The forms of minor orders, including subdeacon, were very short, and consisted simply of the delivery of the instruments: keys to the porters; books of lectors and exorcists; cruets to acolytes; chalice, paten, basin, ewer and towel to subdeacons. Bidding Prayers and all are in the Roman Pontifical of today. In the ordination of deacons there is a form which is found in the Byzantine Rite but has not been adopted in the Roman Rite, the recognition by the people, after an address, with the cry of Dignus est! This is used for priests and bishops also, for example, the Axios acclamation in Byzantine ordinations. The Bidding Prayer and collect which follow are both in the present Roman Pontifical, though separated by much additional matter. The ordination of priests was of the same type as that of deacons, with the addition of the anointing of the hands. The address, with a varied end, and the collect (but not the Bidding Prayer), and the anointing of the hands with its formula are in the modern Roman Pontifical, but with very large additions. The consecration of bishops began, after an election, with a presentation and recognition, neither of which is in the modern Pontifical. Then followed a long Bidding Prayer, also not adopted in the Roman Rite, and the Consecration Prayer Deus omnium honorum, part of which is embodied in the Preface in the Leonine and Gregorian Sacramentaries, and in the present Pontifical. During this prayer two bishops held the Book of the Gospels over the candidate, and all the bishops laid their hands on his head. Then followed the anointing of the hands, but apparently not of the head as in the modern rite, with a formula which is not in the Roman books.

=== The Consecration of a church ===
The Consecration of a church does not occur in the recognized Gallican books and from prayers in the Gelasian Sacramentary and Missale Francorum. Duchesne's analysis of both rites shows, in Christian worship, that at a time when the Roman Rite of Consecration was exclusively funerary and contained little else but the deposition of the relics, as shown in the Ordines Romani in the Saint-Amand Abbey manuscript, (Note: Bibliothèque nationale de France. Manuscript. Latin 974.) the Gallican Rite resembled more closely that of the modern Pontifical, which may be presumed to have borrowed from it. A 9th century commentary on the ritual of a dedication, attributed by Edmond Martène to Remigius of Auxerre, and the 8th or 9th century Angoulême Sacramentary manuscript are the other authorities from which Duchesne derives his details. The order of the Celtic Consecration given in the An Leabhar Breac is very similar. (Note: For the order of the consecration of a church, see Jenner (1909).)
