= Sue Rankin =

American academic

- Born: Susan Ruth Rankin; 1956 (age 69–70)

Academic background
- Education: Montclair State Teachers College (BS); Pennsylvania State University (MS, PhD)
- Thesis: The Perceptions of Heterosexual Faculty and Administrators Toward Gay Men and Lesbians (1994)
- Doctoral advisor: M. Lee Upcraft

Academic work
- Discipline: Higher education policy, queer studies
- Institutions: Pennsylvania State University
- Website: rankin-consulting.com

Susan Ruth Rankin (born 1956) is an American academic specializing in higher education policy and queer studies. She was a member of the faculty and administration at Pennsylvania State University from 1979 to 2013. Rankin is part of the LGBTQ sports movement and was one of the first openly lesbian NCAA Division I coaches.

== Education ==
Sue Rankin completed a B.S. in physiology, health, and physical education at the Montclair State Teachers College in 1978. At the Pennsylvania State University (PSU), she earned a M.S. (1981) in physiology with a specialization in aging and a Ph.D. (1994) in higher education administration with a focus in organizational theory and social justice in higher education. Her master's thesis was titled, A comparison of the use of Nautilus apparatus and Universal Gym Equipment for the development of strength and flexibility. Rankin's dissertation was titled, The Perceptions of Heterosexual Faculty and Administrators Toward Gay Men and Lesbians. Her doctoral thesis advisor was M. Lee Upcraft.

== Career ==
Rankin joined the faculty at PSU in 1979 as a lecturer in kinesiology in the College of Health and Human Development. From 1998 to 2001, she was coordinator of LGBT Equity at PSU. Rankin held various administrative positions including head of public scholarship initiatives and senior diversity planning analyst. She was an affiliate assistant professor of education policy studies from 2002 to 2006 before being promoted to associate professor and senior research associate from 2006 to 2013.

Rankin is recognized as a prominent figure in the LGBTQ sports movement. She was the head coach of the women's softball team at PSU from 1979 to 1996.

Rankin researches higher education policy and queer studies. Her studies investigate LGBT life on college campuses.

== Personal life ==
Rankin was one of the first openly lesbian NCAA Division I coaches during the 1980s and 1990s.

== Selected works ==
=== Books ===
- Rankin, Sue; Weber, Genevieve N.; Blumenfeld, Warren J.; Frazer, Somjen (2010). 2010 State of Higher Education for Lesbian, Gay, Bisexual & Transgender People. Campus Pride. ISBN 978-0-9830176-0-8.
- Beemyn, Genny; Rankin, Susan (2011). The Lives of Transgender People. Columbia University Press. ISBN 978-0-231-14307-3.

=== Journal articles ===
- Rankin, Susan R.; Reason, Robert Dean (2005). "Differing Perceptions: How Students of Color and White Students Perceive Campus Climate for Underrepresented Groups". Journal of College Student Development. 46 (1): 43–61. doi:10.1353/csd.2005.0008. ISSN 1543-3382. S2CID 145079992.
- Rankin, Susan R. (2005). "Campus climates for sexual minorities". New Directions for Student Services. 2005 (111): 17–23. doi:10.1002/ss.170. ISSN 0164-7970.
- Rankin, Susan; Reason, Robert (2008). "Transformational Tapestry Model: A comprehensive approach to transforming campus climate". Journal of Diversity in Higher Education. 1 (4): 262–274. doi:10.1037/a0014018. ISSN 1938-8934.
- Rankin, Sue; Beemyn, Genny (2012). "Beyond a binary: The lives of gender-nonconforming youth". About Campus. 17 (4): 2–10. doi:10.1002/abc.21086. S2CID 145529045.
