= Higher education policy =

Rules and strategies governing higher education systems

Higher education policy refers to education policy concerning higher education systems and institutions, including universities, colleges, institutes of technology, research institutions and other post-secondary providers. It covers how higher education is organised, funded, regulated, quality-assured and connected to wider social, economic, cultural and research objectives.

Policy areas commonly associated with higher education include governance, institutional autonomy, public funding, tuition fees, student financial support, quality assurance, admissions, widening participation, research funding, internationalisation, recognition of qualifications, graduate employment, academic freedom and the relationship between higher education and the labour market.

== Policy areas ==
=== Governance and regulation ===
Higher education policy often defines the legal status, powers and responsibilities of higher education institutions. This may include the balance between institutional autonomy and public accountability, the role of ministries and intermediary bodies, and the regulation of governing bodies, leadership, financial management and institutional performance.

Governance systems vary across countries. Some systems rely heavily on direct ministerial control, while others use arm's-length agencies, funding councils, accreditation bodies or quality assurance agencies to regulate and oversee institutions. Higher education governance may also include policies on academic freedom, public accountability, institutional mergers, university status, and the designation or recognition of higher education providers.

=== Funding and student finance ===
The funding of higher education varies by country and may include direct public grants, competitive research funding, tuition fees, student loans, scholarships, tax incentives, philanthropy and private investment. Public funding may be allocated through block grants, formula funding, negotiated performance agreements, competitive calls or targeted programmes.

The OECD has identified higher education resourcing as a major policy area, including institutional funding, student support, resource governance and coordination, and human resources. OECD work on higher education funding has also examined the financial sustainability of public and publicly funded higher education institutions, including the role of core operating grants.

=== Access and participation ===
Higher education policy frequently addresses who can enter, participate in and complete higher education. Policies may include admissions rules, student aid, outreach, widening participation, support for disadvantaged students, and measures to improve retention and graduate outcomes.

Access policies can focus on socioeconomic background, disability, ethnicity, gender, geography, age, prior educational opportunity, migration status, or membership of historically under-represented communities. In some systems, policy has shifted from a narrow focus on entry into higher education to a broader focus on access, participation, student success and progression after graduation.

=== Quality assurance and qualifications ===
Quality assurance policy concerns how higher education standards are maintained, reviewed and improved. This may include institutional reviews, programme accreditation, external examining, national quality codes, professional accreditation, and requirements for public reporting.

Qualifications policy may include national qualifications frameworks, degree standards, recognition of foreign qualifications and alignment with international frameworks. In Europe, national qualifications frameworks may be referenced to the European Qualifications Framework and the Framework for Qualifications of the European Higher Education Area.

=== Research and innovation ===
Higher education policy often overlaps with research and innovation policy. Governments may fund universities and research institutes to support basic research, applied research, innovation, doctoral training, knowledge exchange, commercialisation and collaboration with industry, government and civil society.

Some systems use performance-based research funding, competitive research councils, research assessment exercises or strategic national research programmes. These policies can influence institutional priorities, academic careers, research collaboration and the balance between teaching and research.

=== Internationalisation ===
Internationalisation policies may concern international student recruitment, transnational education, student and staff mobility, international research collaboration, branch campuses, recognition of foreign qualifications and participation in programmes such as the Erasmus+ programme.

Policies on internationalisation are often linked to migration rules, student visas, quality assurance, export education, research collaboration and soft power. They may also raise questions about student protection, housing, language support, academic standards and dependence on international fee income.

== Comparative frameworks ==
Comparative research has identified different national models of higher education policy. Ansell described three broad institutional forms of higher education provision in advanced industrial states: Anglo-Saxon, Continental and Scandinavian systems. According to this account, the Anglo-Saxon model tends toward mass higher education with a significant private contribution; the Continental model tends toward a more publicly funded and historically elite system; and the Scandinavian model tends toward mass higher education with high levels of public expenditure.

Later comparative work has often treated these categories as broad ideal types rather than fixed descriptions. National higher education systems may combine features of several models, and policy reforms can change the balance between public funding, private contribution, institutional autonomy and state regulation.

=== Anglo-Saxon systems ===
Anglo-Saxon or Anglo-American higher education systems are often associated with institutional autonomy, competitive funding, tuition fees, diversified providers and market-oriented policy instruments. Examples commonly discussed include the United States, England, Australia and, to varying degrees, other English-speaking systems.

=== Continental systems ===
Continental European systems have often been characterised by stronger state coordination, lower or no tuition fees in public institutions, and a historically closer relationship between universities and the state. Reforms associated with the Bologna Process, qualifications frameworks and European quality assurance have altered many of these systems.

=== Scandinavian systems ===
Scandinavian higher education systems are often described as publicly funded, high-participation systems with comparatively strong welfare-state support for students. They are commonly associated with low or no tuition fees for domestic students and substantial public investment in education.

== International policy observatories ==
The UNESCO International Institute for Higher Education in Latin America and the Caribbean operates the Higher Education Policy Observatory, an online platform providing comparative information on national higher education systems and policies. The observatory includes indicators on governance structures, legislative frameworks, quality assurance, planning, access, public higher education gratuity, admission pathways and recognition of foreign qualifications. In 2025, the observatory was expanded to include statistical indicators from the UNESCO Institute for Statistics on personnel, enrolment, graduation, funding and expenditure, and international mobility.

The OECD also publishes comparative analysis of higher education policy through its education and skills work, including Education at a Glance, the Higher Education Policy programme and thematic reports on resourcing, digitalisation, skills and institutional roles in upskilling and reskilling.

== By country ==
=== Ireland ===
In Ireland, higher education policy is overseen by the Department of Further and Higher Education, Research, Innovation and Science. The Higher Education Authority is the statutory planning, development and funding body for higher education and research in Ireland.

The Higher Education Authority Act 2022 replaced the Higher Education Authority Act 1971 and modernised the regulatory role of the HEA, including oversight of designated institutions of higher education and a governance, performance and accountability framework for the sector.

Irish higher education policy includes system performance, access, funding, research, internationalisation and institutional governance. The HEA's System Performance Framework 2023–2028 sets out system-level priorities and provides a basis for performance dialogue with higher education institutions. Ireland's National Access Plan 2022–2028 sets out policy for equity of access, participation and success in higher education.

Quality and Qualifications Ireland is responsible for quality assurance and qualifications in further and higher education. It maintains the National Framework of Qualifications, validates certain programmes, makes certain awards, and operates recognition services for foreign qualifications.

=== England ===
In England, higher education policy is shaped by the Department for Education, the Office for Students and other bodies such as Research England. The Office for Students is the independent regulator of higher education in England and regulates providers on issues including quality and standards, financial sustainability, access and participation, and student protection.

English higher education policy includes tuition fee regulation, student loans, access and participation plans, quality assessment, institutional registration and the allocation of public funding for teaching and research. The system has been associated with market-oriented reforms, including competition between providers and a substantial role for student fee income.

=== United States ===
Higher education policy in the United States is decentralised. States, the federal government, accrediting agencies, institutions and courts all play roles in shaping policy. State governments are major funders and regulators of public higher education, while the federal government has major responsibilities in student financial aid, civil rights enforcement, research funding and data collection.

The United States Department of Education administers federal student aid programmes, enforces federal education laws and collects data on postsecondary education. Accreditation is carried out by recognised accrediting agencies and is linked to institutional eligibility for federal student aid.

=== Australia ===
In Australia, higher education policy is overseen by the Australian Government Department of Education, while quality assurance and regulation are carried out by the Tertiary Education Quality and Standards Agency (TEQSA). TEQSA regulates and assures the quality of Australia's higher education sector against the Higher Education Standards Framework.

Australian higher education policy includes public funding, student loan arrangements, research funding, international education, quality assurance and equity in access. The Australian Universities Accord final report, published in 2024, proposed reforms relating to participation, funding, skills, research, governance and system stewardship.

== Debates and criticism ==
Higher education policy is often contested because it involves trade-offs between access, quality, public cost, institutional autonomy and labour-market objectives. Policies that expand participation may increase educational opportunity but also raise questions about funding, capacity, student support and graduate employment.

Tuition fees and student loans are common areas of dispute. Supporters argue that private contributions can expand capacity and target public spending, while critics argue that high fees and debt may reduce access, increase inequality or shift risk from the state to individuals.

Performance-based funding and competitive research funding are also debated. Supporters argue that they can improve efficiency, accountability and excellence, while critics argue that they may encourage short-termism, institutional stratification, gaming of metrics, or reduced support for disciplines and activities that are less easily measured.

Internationalisation policies can generate economic and cultural benefits, but may also create risks for institutions that become dependent on international fee income. The growth of international student recruitment has also raised policy concerns about migration rules, student housing, quality assurance and student welfare.

== See also ==
- Academic freedom
- Education policy
- European Higher Education Area
- European Qualifications Framework
- Governance in higher education
- Higher education accreditation
- Higher education bubble
- Quality assurance
- Tertiary education
- Widening participation
