= Ninine =

Ninine or Niníne is a name. It may also be the Ninine or Ninene people of Tasmania.

== List of people with the given name ==
- Niníne Éces (born circa 800), Irish poet
- Ninine Garcia, French guitarist

== List of people with the surname ==
- Jules Ninine (1903–1969), politician from France, Guadeloupe and Cameroon
