= Pauline Park =

American transgender activist

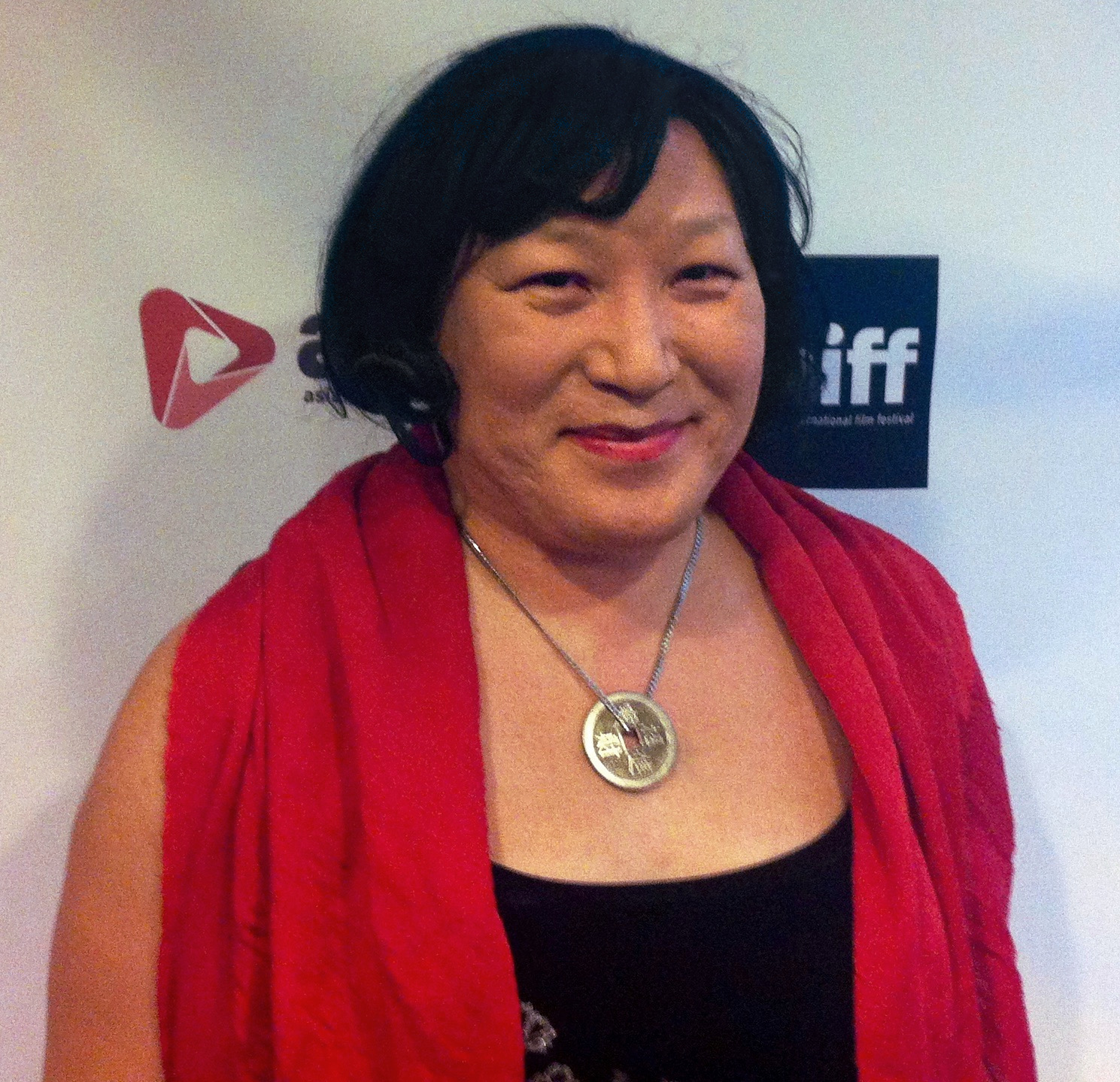
- Park in 2016
- Education: University of Wisconsin–Madison, London School of Economics and Political Science, and University of Illinois at Urbana-Champaign
- Occupation: Transgender activist
- Website: www.paulinepark.com

Pauline Park (born 1960) is a transgender activist based in New York City.

== Early life and education ==
Born in Korea, Park was adopted by European American parents and raised in the United States. As a child, she attended public schools in Milwaukee. She received a B.A. in philosophy from the University of Wisconsin–Madison, an M.Sc. in European studies from the London School of Economics and Political Science, and a Ph.D. in political science at the University of Illinois at Urbana-Champaign. Park was the first student from any University of Illinois campus to receive a Fulbright fellowship for France, which she was awarded to fund her dissertation research on the Maastricht Treaty on European Union; she was introduced to Sen. William Fulbright at the American embassy in Paris at a reception for academic year 1991-92 Fulbright recipients for France.

== Activism ==
In 1997, Park co-founded Queens Pride House, a center for the LGBT communities of Queens, and Iban/Queer Koreans of New York. She was the founding first secretary of the board of directors of Queens Pride House and helped draft the organization's bylawys; she also supervised the board election in January 1999. Park served as coordinator of Iban/QKNY from 1997 to 1999, editing the organization's newsletter. In 1998, she co-founded the New York Association for Gender Rights Advocacy (NYAGRA), the first statewide transgender advocacy organization in New York; she sought and secured over $175,000 in funding for NYAGRA from foundations.

Park served as coordinator of the work group which led the campaign for the transgender rights law enacted by the New York City Council (Int. No. 24, enacted as Local Law 3 of 2002). She served on the working group that helped to draft guidelines—adopted by the Commission on Human Rights in December 2004—for implementation of the new statute.

Park negotiated inclusion of gender identity and expression in the Dignity For All Students Act (DASA), a safe schools bill enacted by the New York State Legislature in 2010, and the first fully transgender-inclusive legislation introduced in that body. She also served on the steering committee of the coalition that secured enactment of the Dignity in All Schools Act by the New York City Council in September 2004. In 2005, Park became the first openly transgender person chosen to be grand marshal of the New York City Pride March, the oldest and largest pride event in the United States.

In January 2012, Park participated in the first US LGBTQ delegation tour of Palestine.

In 2009, Park was named 'a leading advocate for transgender rights in New York' on Idealist in NYC's 'New York 40.' In December 2011, she was designated one of the 'official top 25 significant queer women of 2011' by Velvetpark. In October 2012, she was one of 54 individuals named to a list of 'The Most Influential LGBT Asian Icons' by the Huffington post. In November 2012, she was named to a list of '50 Transgender Icons' for Transgender Day of Remembrance 2012.

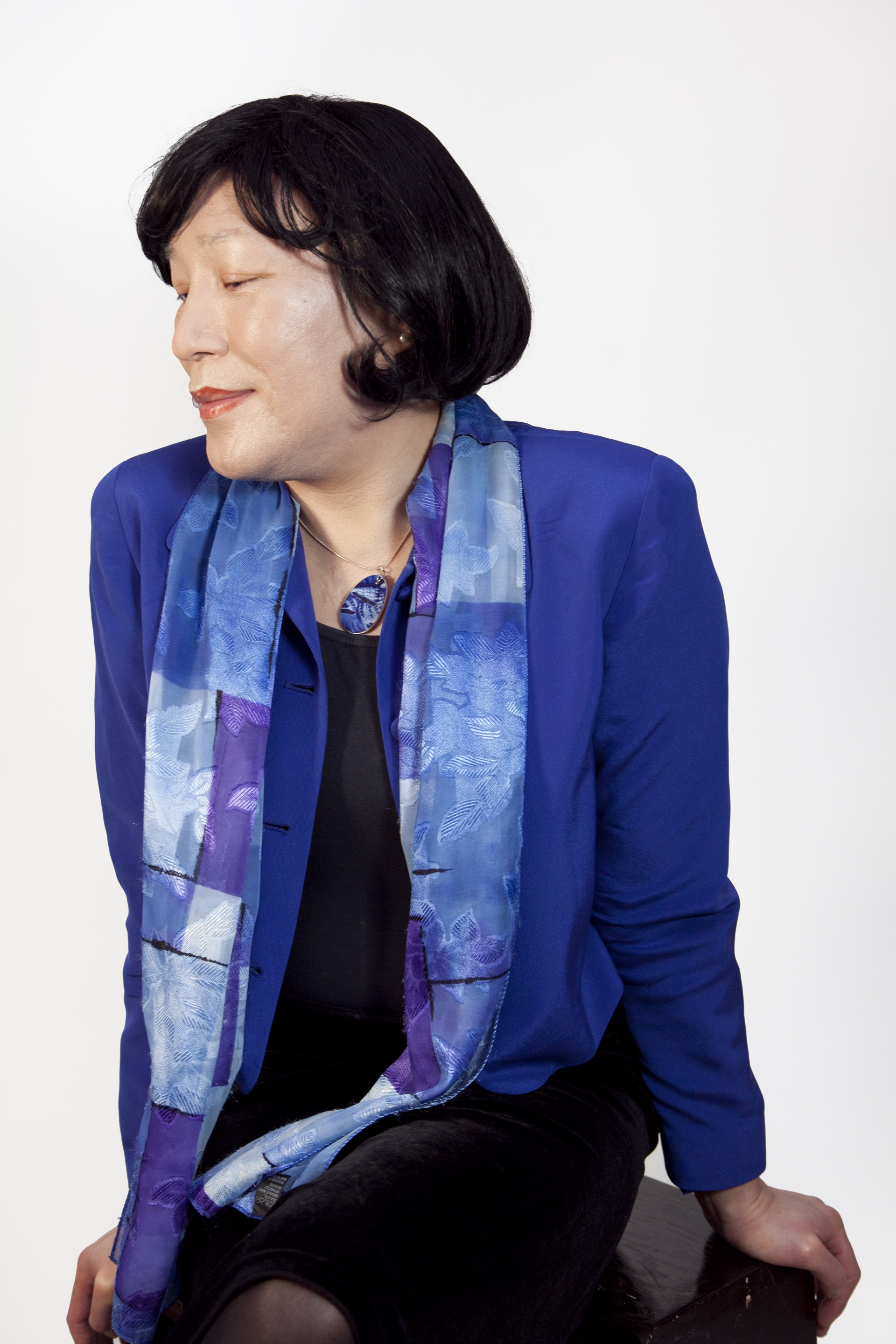
Pauline Park's Visibility Project portrait

== Other ==
She is the subject of Envisioning Justice: The Journey of a Transgendered Woman, a 32-minute documentary about her life and work by documentarian Larry Tung that premiered at the New York LGBT Film Festival (NewFest) in 2008.

In 2010, Park recorded "Barricades Mystérieuses", which includes keyboard music by Couperin, Bach, Beethoven, Schumann, Chopin, and Debussy.

In June 2015, Park joined a group of Korean adoptees returning to Korea in search of information about their birth parents and relatives. Park's trip, which also coincided with the Queer Korea Festival that preceded the Seoul Pride Parade of that year, was the subject of a biographical documentary short film, "Coming Full Circle: The Journey of a Transgendered Korean Adoptee," also directed by Tung.

On 28 June 2015, she was the keynote speaker at the Queer Korea Festival/Seoul Pride Parade, the largest event in the history of the LGBTQ community Korea up to that date, with a crowd estimated at more than 35,000.

On 6 July 2015, Park gave a presentation on the first US LGBTQ delegation tour of Palestine (which she was part of in 2012), at a meeting of Palestine Peace & Solidarity group in South Korea.
