= Susan Rankin =

English musicologist, professor of medieval music

Susan Kathleen Rankin, Litt.D., FBA, FSA, is an English musicologist. Since 2006, she has been a professor of medieval music at the University of Cambridge; she has also been a Fellow of Emmanuel College, Cambridge, since 1981.

== Life and career ==
Rankin completed her undergraduate degree at Newnham College, Cambridge, in 1975, and then graduated from King's College London with a Master of Music degree the following year; in 1982, she was awarded a doctorate by the University of Cambridge. From 1981 to 1984, she was a Research Fellow at Emmanuel College before becoming an official Fellow. In 1990, Rankin was appointed an assistant lecturer in Medieval Music at Cambridge; she was promoted three years later to lecturer, and then to reader in 1999. Since 2013, she has also been Chair of the Henry Bradshaw Society. According to her British Academy profile, her research relates to "Western medieval music and its transmission and notation from the origins to the thirteenth century and the development of the Latin liturgy, with an especial focus on ritual".

== Honours ==
Rankin was awarded the Dent Medal by the Royal Musical Association in 1995. In 2006, she was elected to the fellowship of the Society of Antiquaries of London (FSA), and in 2009 was also elected a Fellow of the British Academy (FBA), the United Kingdom's national academy for the humanities and social sciences. In 2021-2022 she held the Lyell Readership in Bibliography. The American Musicological Society elected her a Corresponding Member in 2015 and the Medieval Academy of America awarded her a Corresponding Fellowship in 2016. At Cambridge University, UK, Prof. Rankin is Vice-Master of Emmanuel College.

== Selected works ==
- The Music of the Medieval Liturgical Drama in France and England, 2 vols (Garland, 1989)
- Rankin, Susan (1991). "The Earliest Sources of Notker's Sequences: St Gallen, Vadiana 317, and Paris, Bibliothèque Nationale lat. 10587". Early Music History. 10: 201–233. doi:10.1017/S0261127900001133. JSTOR 942454. S2CID 193196394.
- (Co-edited with D. Hiley) Music in the Medieval English Liturgy: Plainsong and Medieval Music Society Centennial Essays (Oxford University Press, 1993)
- (Co-edited with W. Arlt) Stiftsbibliothek St Gallen Codices 484 & 381, 3 vols (Amadeus, 1996)
- The Winchester Troper: Introduction and Facsimile, Early English Church Music series, no. 50 (Stainer and Bell, 2007)
- Writing Sounds in Carolingian Europe: the invention of musical notation, ISBN 978-1108421409, 2018
- Sounding the Word of God: Carolingian books for singers, ISBN 978-0268203436, 2022
