= Saint Patrick =

Christian missionary, bishop, and saint

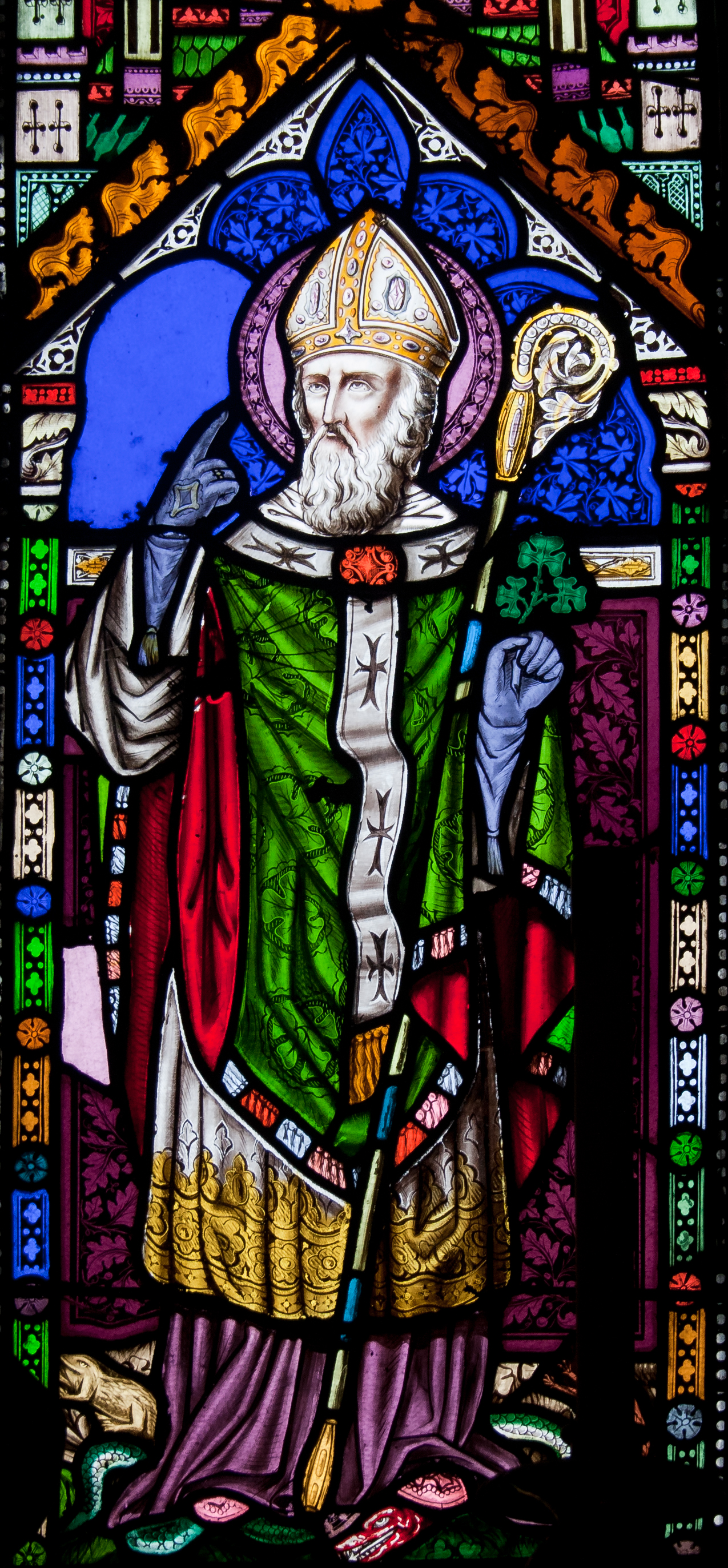
- Stained-glass window of Saint Patrick from Church of the Assumption, Our Lady's Island, County Wexford, Ireland

Bishop and Confessor; "Apostle of Ireland"
- Born: Britain
- Died: Mid-fifth to early-sixth century Ireland
- Resting place: Downpatrick
- Venerated in: Catholicism; Eastern Orthodoxy; Oriental Orthodoxy; Lutheranism; Anglicanism
- Major shrine: Downpatrick, Croagh Patrick
- Feast: 17 March (Saint Patrick's Day)
- Attributes: Crozier, mitre, holding a shamrock, carrying a cross, repelling snakes, green colour
- Patronage: Ireland, Nigeria, Montserrat, Archdiocese of New York, Roman Catholic Archdiocese of Newark, Roman Catholic Archdiocese of Los Angeles, Boston, Rolla, Missouri, Loíza, Puerto Rico, Murcia (Spain), Clann Giolla Phádraig, engineers, paralegals, Archdiocese of Adelaide, Archdiocese of Melbourne; invoked against snakes, sins

Saint Patrick (Note: Latin: Pātricius; Irish: Pádraig, Irish pronunciation: [ˈpˠɑːɾˠɪɟ] or [ˈpˠaːd̪ˠɾˠəɟ]; Welsh: Padrig, Welsh pronunciation: [ˈpadrɪɡ]) was a fifth-century Romano-British Christian missionary and bishop in Ireland. Known as the "Apostle of Ireland", he is the primary patron saint of Ireland, the other patron saints being Brigid of Kildare and Columba. He is also the patron saint of Nigeria. Patrick is venerated as a saint in the Catholic Church, the Church of Ireland (part of the Anglican Communion), Lutheranism, and in the Eastern Orthodox Church, where he is regarded as equal-to-the-apostles and Enlightener of Ireland.

The dates of Patrick's life cannot be fixed with certainty, but there is general agreement that he was active as a missionary in Ireland during the fifth century. Two Latin writings by Patrick survive: the Confessio and the Letter to the soldiers of Coroticus. Patrick writes that when he was sixteen, he was captured by Irish pirates from his home in Britain and taken as a slave to Ireland. He writes that he lived there for six years as a herder before escaping and returning to his family. After studying for many years, probably in Gaul, he returned to spread Christianity in Ireland. As a bishop, Patrick converted "thousands" and ordained many priests. Years later, he was summoned to Britain by church leaders to answer various accusations. Patrick issued a lengthy and personal statement denying the accusations and defending himself, which became the Confessio.

The earliest hagiographies of Patrick were written in the seventh century by Muirchú and Tírechán. By this time, he had come to be revered as a patron saint of Ireland. According to tradition, Patrick was the first bishop of Armagh and Primate of Ireland, and is credited with bringing Christianity to Ireland (despite evidence of some earlier Christian presence), converting the people from paganism. There are many legends about Patrick, such as him using a shamrock to symbolize the Trinity, banishing snakes and demons from Ireland, and fasting on a mountaintop.

Saint Patrick's Day, considered his feast day, is observed on 17 March, the supposed date of his death. It is celebrated in Ireland and among the Irish diaspora as a religious and cultural holiday. In the Catholic Church in Ireland, it is both a solemnity and a holy day of obligation.

== Sources ==
Two Latin works survive which are generally accepted as having been written by St. Patrick: the Declaration (Latin: Confessio) and the Letter to the soldiers of Coroticus (Latin: Epistola), from which come the only generally accepted details of his life. The Declaration is the more biographical of the two. In it, Patrick gives a short account of his life and his mission. Most available details of his life are from subsequent hagiographies and annals, which have considerable value but lack the empiricism scholars depend on today.

=== Name ===
The only name that Patrick uses for himself in his own writings is Pātricius (Latin pronunciation: [paːˈtrɪ.ki.ʊs]), which gives Old Irish: Pátraic Irish pronunciation: [ˈpˠaːd̪ˠɾˠəɟ] and Irish: Pádraig (Irish pronunciation: [ˈpˠaːd̪ˠɾˠəɟ] or Irish pronunciation: [ˈpˠɑːɾˠɪɟ]); English Patrick; Scottish Gaelic: Pàdraig; Welsh: Padrig; Cornish: Petroc.

Hagiography records other names he is said to have borne. Tírechán's seventh-century Collectanea gives "Magonus, that is, famous; Succetus, that is, god of war; Patricius, that is, father of the citizens; Cothirthiacus, because he served four houses of druids." "Magonus" appears in the ninth-century Historia Brittonum as Maun, descending from British *Magunos, meaning "servant-lad". "Succetus", which also appears in Muirchú moccu Machtheni's seventh-century Life as Sochet, is identified by Mac Neill as "a word of British origin meaning swineherd". Cothirthiacus also appears as Cothraige in the 8th-century biographical poem known as Fiacc's Hymn and a variety of other spellings elsewhere, and is taken to represent a Primitive Irish: *Qatrikias, although this is disputed. Harvey argues that Cothraige "has the form of a classic Old Irish tribal (and therefore place-) name", noting that Ail Coithrigi is a name for the Rock of Cashel, and the place-names Cothrugu and Catrige are attested in Counties Antrim and Carlow.

Muirchú summarizes that these four names correspond to Patrick's different roles at different periods of this life: "Patrick son of Calforni(us) had four names: Sochet when he was born, Cothriche when he was a slave, Mauonius when he studied, Patrick when he was consecrated."

=== Dating ===
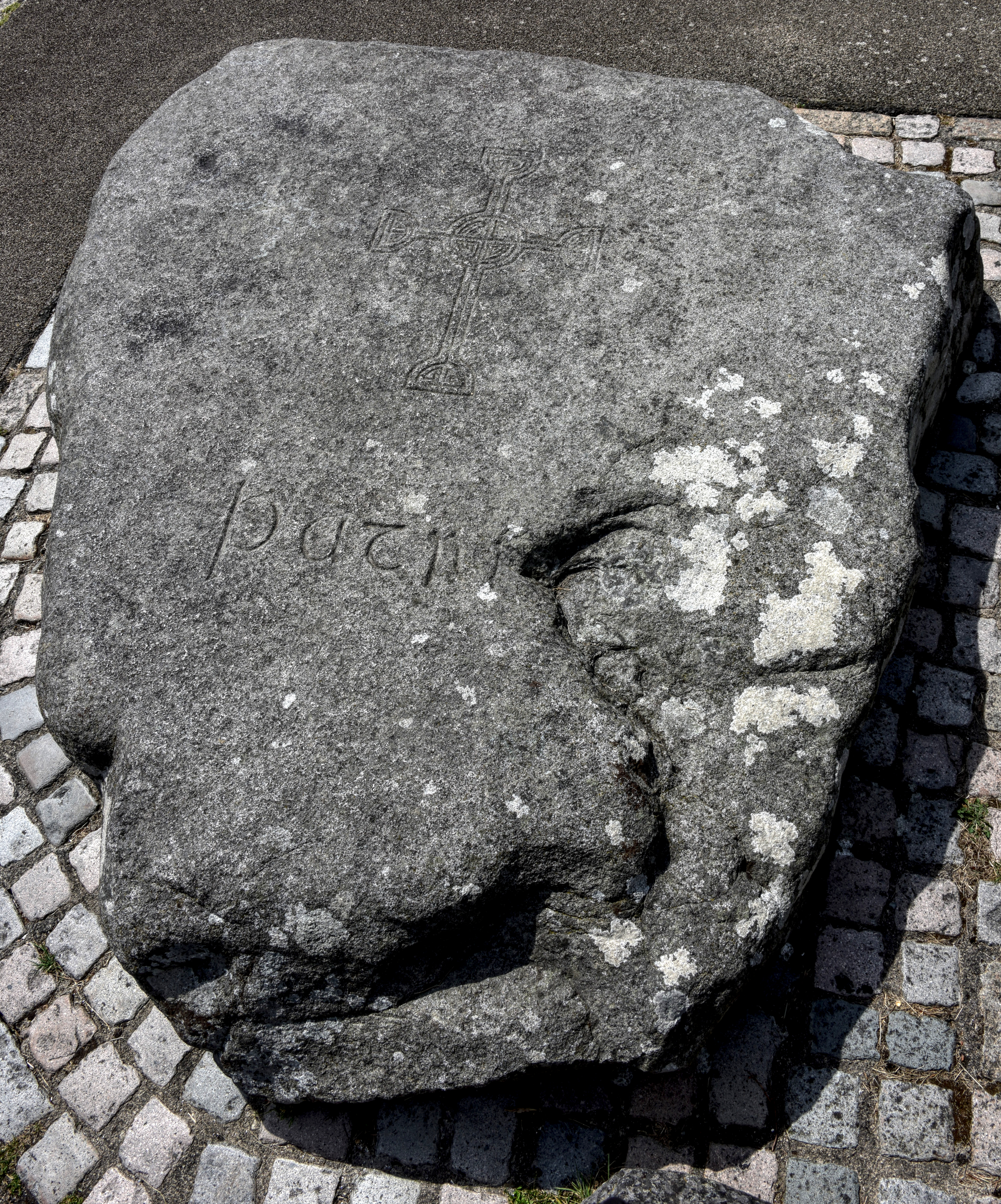
The reputed burial place of Saint Patrick in Downpatrick

The dates of Patrick's life are uncertain; there are conflicting traditions regarding the year of his death. His own writings provide no evidence for any dating more precise than the 5th century generally. His Biblical quotations are a mixture of the Old Latin version and the Vulgate, completed in the early 5th century, suggesting he was writing "at the point of transition from Old Latin to Vulgate", although it is possible the Vulgate readings may have been added later, replacing earlier readings. The Letter to Coroticus implies that the Franks were still pagans at the time of writing; their conversion to Christianity is dated to the period 496–508.

The Irish annals date Patrick's arrival in Ireland at 432, but they were compiled in the mid-6th century at the earliest. The date 432 was probably chosen to minimise the contribution of Palladius, who was known to have been sent to Ireland in 431, and maximise that of Patrick. A variety of dates are given for his death. In 457 "the elder Patrick" (Irish: Patraic Sen) is said to have died: this may refer to the death of Palladius, who according to the Book of Armagh was also called Patrick. In 461/2 the annals say that "Here some record the repose of Patrick"; in 492/3 they record the death of "Patrick, the arch-apostle (or archbishop and apostle) of the Scoti", on 17 March, at the age of 120.

While some modern historians accept the earlier date of c. 460 for Patrick's death, scholars of early Irish history tend to prefer a later date, c. 493. Supporting the later date, the annals record that in 553 "the relics of Patrick were placed sixty years after his death in a shrine by Colum Cille" (emphasis added). The death of Patrick's disciple Mochta is dated in the annals to 535 or 537, and the early hagiographies "all bring Patrick into contact with persons whose obits occur at the end of the fifth century or the beginning of the sixth". However, E. A. Thompson considers that none of the dates given for Patrick's death in the Annals are reliable. A recent biography suggests that a late fifth-century date for the saint is not impossible.

== Life ==
=== Early life and captivity ===
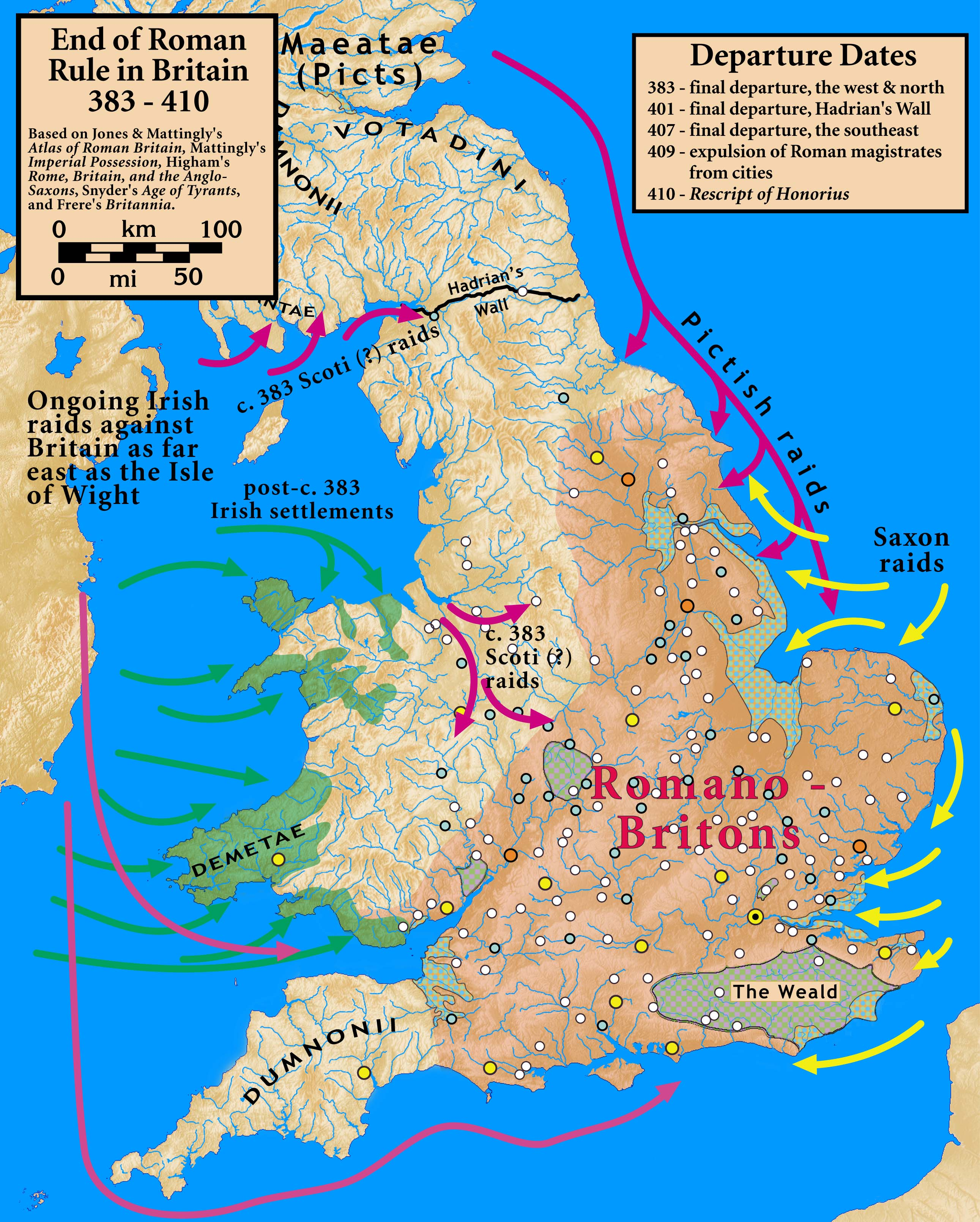
Late Roman Britain

Patrick was born in Britain at the end of Roman rule. He came from a family of Romano-Britons, i.e. Romanized Celtic Britons. He would have spoken British Celtic as his mother tongue, the Irish language, and some Latin. In his Confessio, Patrick writes that his father, Calpurnius, was a decurion (senator and tax collector) of an unnamed Romano-British town, and also a deacon in the Church; his grandfather Potitus was a priest. However, Patrick writes that he was not religious in his youth, and considered himself in that period to be "idle and callow".

His birthplace is not known with any certainty, but it is believed to be near the Irish Sea (as he was captured by Irish pirates) and near a large Roman town (as his father was a decurion). Patrick writes that his family hailed from the vicus of Bannavem Taburniae, and that his father had a small villa nearby. Several places have been proposed. One is the Roman fort Banna (Birdoswald) on Hadrian's Wall, which is near Luguvalium (Carlisle) in Cumbria. Another is Banwen in south Wales, which was the site of a Roman marching camp. The West Country has also been proposed; particularly Banwell-Wint Hill, and Avonmouth, both in Somerset. It has been suggested that the last part of Bannavem Taburniae refers to the Severn (Sabrina) or that it is made up of the Celtic banna (promontory) venta (town) and berniae (a pass or gap). The Roman town of Bannaventa in Northamptonshire is phonically similar to the name Patrick gave, but is probably too far from the sea. Muirchú's 7th century Life of Patrick says that he was born at a place called Nemthor, which in the following centuries was identified with a place near Dumbarton in Strathclyde. Nearby is Kilpatrick, another proposed birthplace.

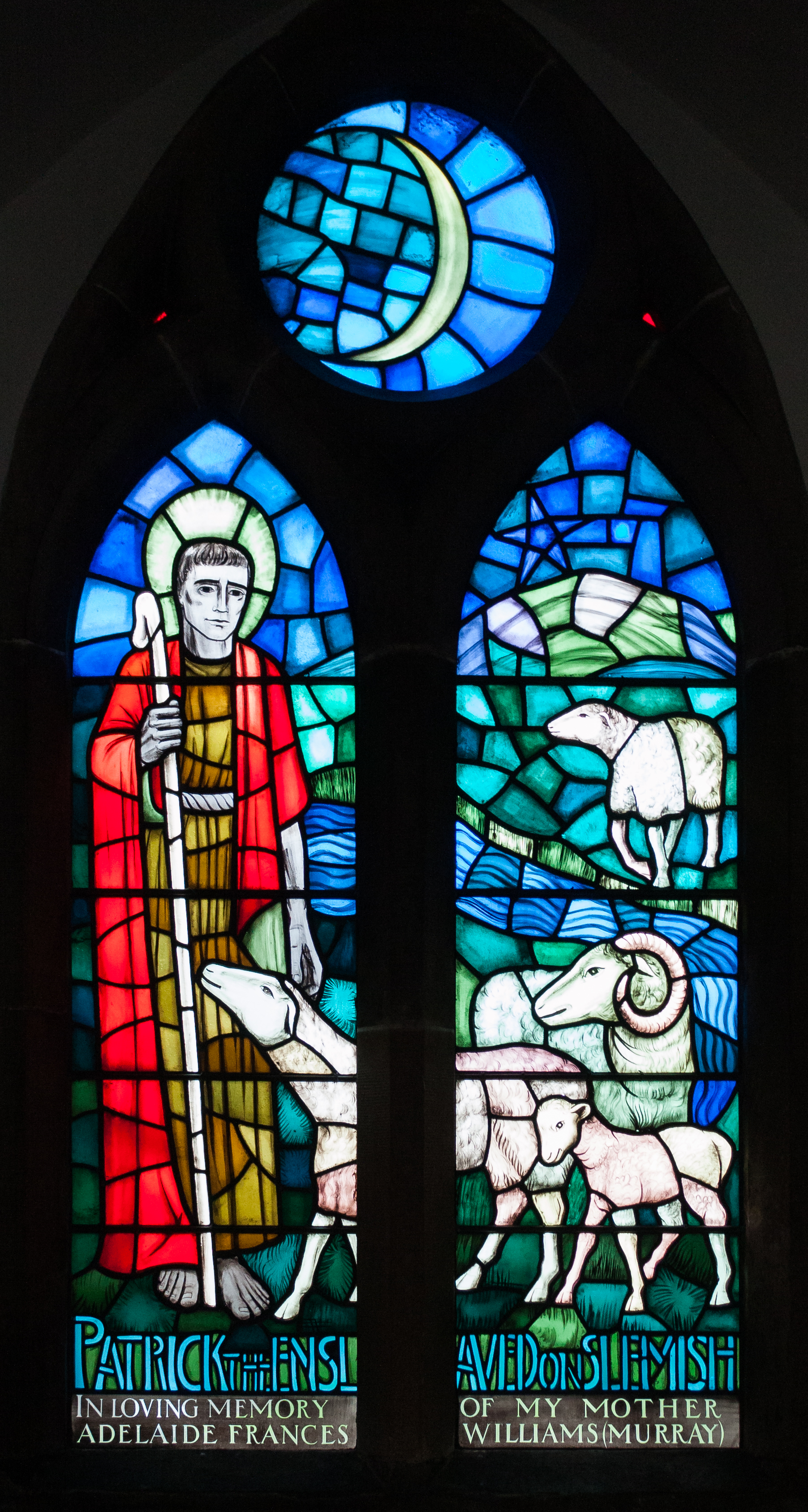
A stained-glass window in St Patrick's Church, Ballymena, showing him as a shepherd near Slemish mountain

According to his Confession, he was captured at the age of sixteen from his family's villa at Bannavem Taburniae by a group of Irish pirates. They took him to Ireland where he was enslaved and held captive for six years. Patrick writes in the Confession that the time he spent in captivity was critical to his spiritual growth. He says that God gave him the opportunity to be forgiven his sins and to grow in his faith through prayer.

As a slave, Patrick worked as a herder and was introduced to the Irish culture that would define his life and reputation. Patrick does not say where in Ireland he worked. However, in his Confessio, he recounts a dream he had many years later, where the people near "the wood of Foclut" (silva Focluti or Vocluti), which is "next to the western sea", beseech him to "come and walk again amongst us". This suggests that Foclut was in the area of his captivity. Patrick writes that after six years of captivity, he heard a voice telling him that he would soon go home, and then that his ship was ready. Fleeing his master, he travelled 200 Roman miles (about 188 statute miles or 300 km) to a port, presumably on the eastern or southern coast, where he found a ship and persuaded the captain to take him aboard. It is generally believed that Foclut refers to Foghill (Fochoill, meaning "under-wood") near Killala Bay in Connacht. However, Patrick's hagiographer Muirchú said it was in the area of Slemish mountain (Sliabh Mis) in Ulster.

Patrick says that they sailed for three days before reaching land. The likelihood that they set sail from the eastern or southern coast, and the length of the journey, suggests that they may have sailed to Gaul, perhaps Armorica. All apparently disembarked and then walked for 28 days in a "wilderness", becoming faint from hunger. Patrick prayed for sustenance, and about the sixteenth day, they came upon a herd of wild boar and were able to feed themselves. Eventually they reached civilization. Patrick's account of his escape from slavery is recounted in his Confessio.

=== Return to Britain and education ===
After a few years (paucos annos), Patrick says he returned home to his family in Britain, now in his early twenties. Patrick then began his ecclesiastical training. Muirchú says that Patrick studied at Auxerre in central Gaul for thirty years. J. B. Bury suggests that Amator ordained Patrick to the diaconate at Auxerre. It is suggested that Saint Germanus of Auxerre, a bishop of the Western Church, ordained him to the priesthood, while Maximus of Turin is said to have consecrated him as bishop. However, Tírechán says that Patrick studied for thirty years at Lérins Abbey off the south coast of Gaul.

Patrick recounts that he had a vision a few years after returning home:

I saw a man coming, as it were from Ireland. His name was Victoricus, and he carried many letters, and he gave me one of them. I read the heading: "The Voice of the Irish" (Vox Hiberionacum). As I began the letter, I imagined in that moment that I heard the voice of those very people who were near the wood of Foclut, which is beside the western sea—and they cried out, as with one voice: "We appeal to you, holy servant boy, to come and walk among us."

A.B.E. Hood suggests that the Victoricus of St. Patrick's vision may be identified with Saint Victricius, bishop of Rouen in the late fourth century, who had visited Britain in an official capacity in 396. However, Ludwig Bieler disagrees.

Patrick writes in his Epistola that he was a bishop established in Ireland, and that he had sold his "nobility ... for the sake of others". It is presumed that the church in Britain sent Patrick to be a bishop for part of Ireland, with Papal approval, and that he had sold his late father's estate to raise funds for the Irish bishopric.

=== Mission in Ireland ===
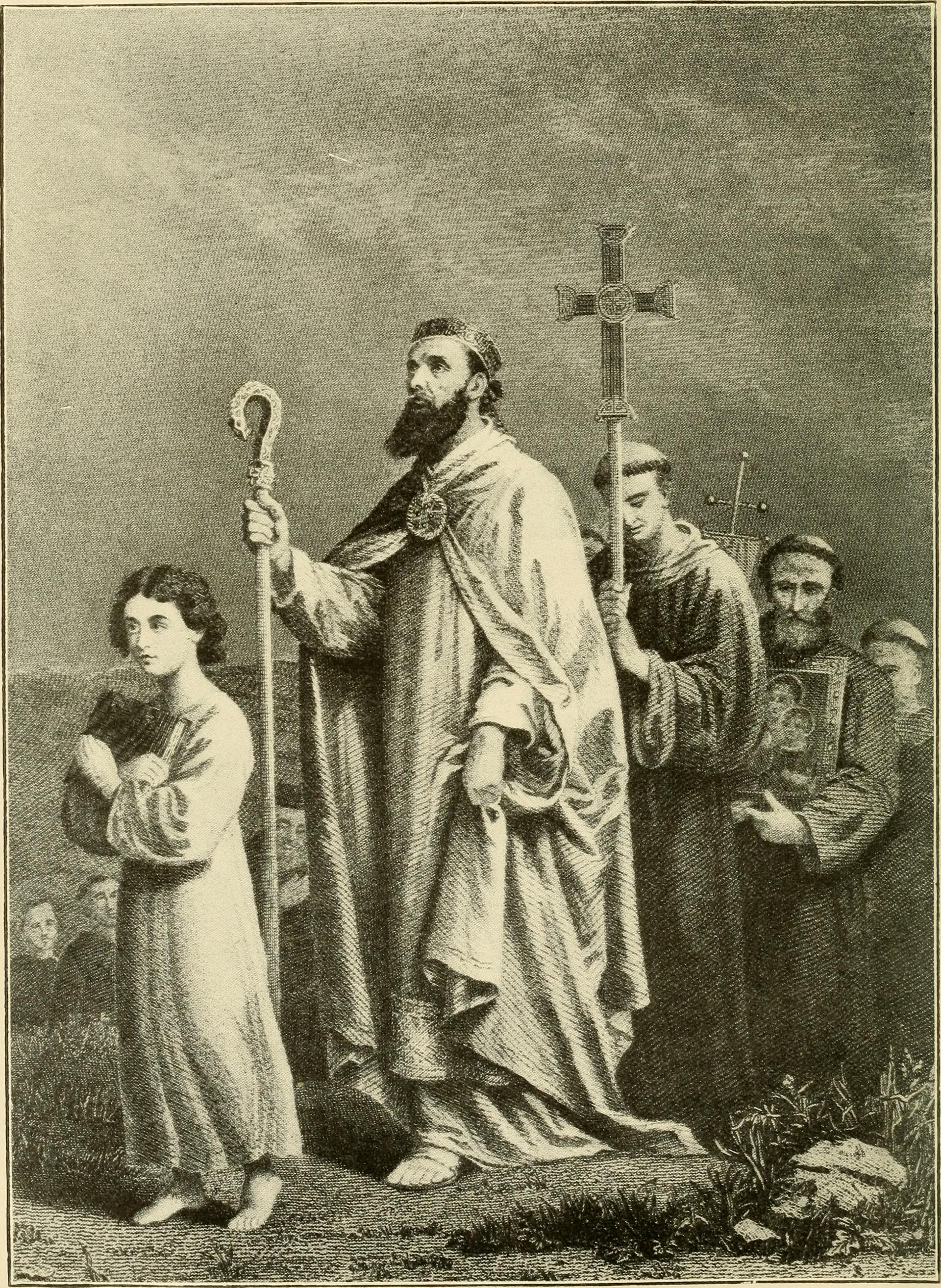
"Patrick going to Tara", illustration from a 1904 book

Patrick returned to Ireland as a Christian missionary. According to Muirchú, he landed at Inber Dea in Cualu (now Arklow in County Wicklow). Muirchú says that Patrick then decided to travel north to convert his former master, Miliuc of Dál mBuinne, and to buy his freedom. He rested at an island later named after him, before sailing north and landing at Mag Inis in the territory of Dál Fiatach. According to Muirchú, Patrick converted the local chieftain Díchu and was given a barn as a church, which became known as Sabhall Phádraig (Patrick's barn), now Saul. Tírechán, however, says that Patrick landed in Brega and founded his first churches there, then travelled clockwise around the island. Brega was part of the kingdom of Meath and included the royal capital of Tara. He says that Benen (or Benignus), son of the chieftain Secsnán, was Patrick's first Irish disciple. After founding his first church, both Muirchú and Tírechán have Patrick contending with Lóegaire mac Néill, the king of Tara.

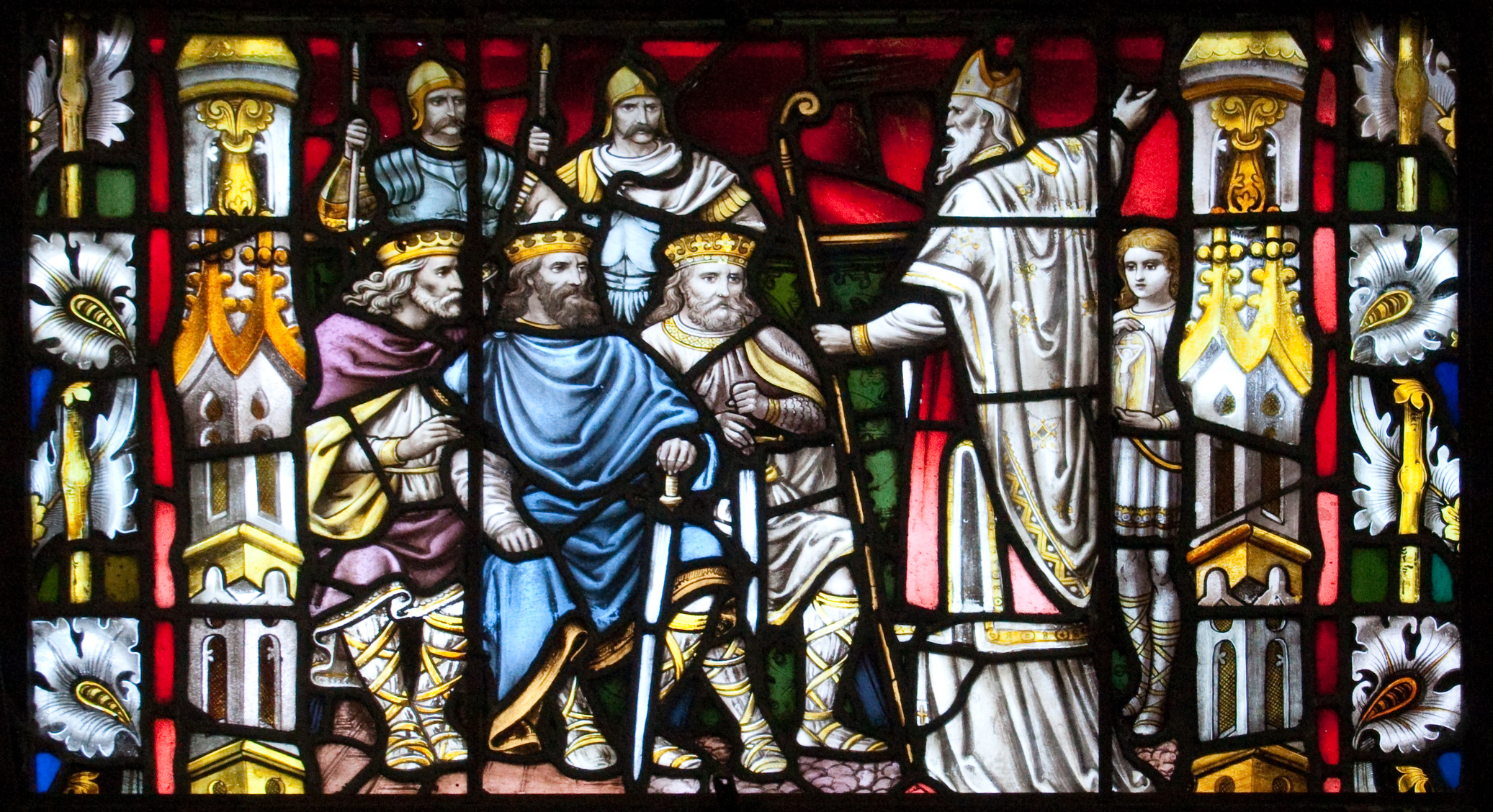
Stained glass window in Carlow Cathedral, showing Saint Patrick preaching to Irish kings

From the Confessio, something can be seen of Patrick's mission. He writes that he "baptised thousands of people", even planning to convert his slavers. He ordained priests to lead the new Christian communities. He converted wealthy women, some of whom became nuns in the face of family opposition. He also dealt with the sons of kings, converting them too. The Confessio is generally vague about the details of his work in Ireland, though giving some specific instances. This is partly because, as he says at points, he was writing for a local audience of Christians who knew him and his work. There are several mentions of travelling around the island and of sometimes difficult interactions with the ruling elite. He claims of the Irish:

Never before did they know of God except to serve idols and unclean things. But now, they have become the people of the Lord, and are called children of God. The sons and daughters of the leaders of the Irish are seen to be monks and virgins of Christ!

Patrick's position as a foreigner in Ireland was not an easy one. His refusal to accept gifts from kings placed him outside the normal ties of kinship, fosterage and affinity. He says that he was on one occasion beaten, robbed of all he had, and put in chains, perhaps awaiting execution. Patrick says that he was also "many years later" a captive for 60 days, without giving details.

=== Letter to Coroticus and defence against accusers ===
Patrick's Letter to the Soldiers of Coroticus (Epistola ad milites Corotici), is an open letter announcing his excommunication of a British king, Coroticus, and his soldiers, because they had killed and enslaved some of Patrick's new converts while raiding in Ireland. Patrick writes, "I cannot say that they are my fellow-citizens, nor fellow-citizens of the saints of Rome, but fellow-citizens of demons, because of their evil works". He calls them "allies of the Scots and apostate Picts". In other words, Coroticus was at least nominally Christian, and the southern Picts had converted to Christianity but lapsed into paganism. The Scots (Scotti in Latin) are most likely the Gaels of Dál Riata. Coroticus is widely believed to be king Ceretic of Alt Clut, the region surrounding Dumbarton (Ail Cluaithe in Irish). Thompson however proposed that Coroticus was a Romano-British warlord based at Ailech in the north of Ireland.

After spending decades in Ireland, Patrick was summoned to Britain by church leaders to answer various accusations or charges. He is estimated to have been around 60 years old. It is possible that Patrick's letter led to his being summoned. Historian Charles Thomas suggests that there were longstanding accusations against Patrick; when he publicly excommunicated king Coroticus, he overstepped his authority, and the Church in northern Britain at last decided to call him to account.

Patrick does not say outright what these accusations were, but they can be inferred based on the rebuttals he gives in his Confessio. He was accused of financial impropriety, and perhaps of obtaining his bishopric in Ireland with personal gain in mind. Specific accusations seem to be that he accepted valuable gifts from the Irish nobility, including from those hoping to be ordained, and took payment for baptisms. Patrick refused to leave Ireland, but instead issued a lengthy statement denying the accusations and defending himself. He says that he gave up his nobility in Britain, left his family and his homeland to work in Ireland, suffering insult, violence and imprisonment. Patrick says he returned the gifts wealthy women gave him, did not ask payment for baptisms, nor for ordaining priests, and indeed paid for many gifts to kings and judges, as well as compensating the sons of chiefs to accompany him. According to Roy Flechner, the Confessio was written in part as a defence against his detractors, who did not believe that he was taken to Ireland as a slave, despite Patrick's vigorous insistence that he was.

== Seventh-century hagiographies ==
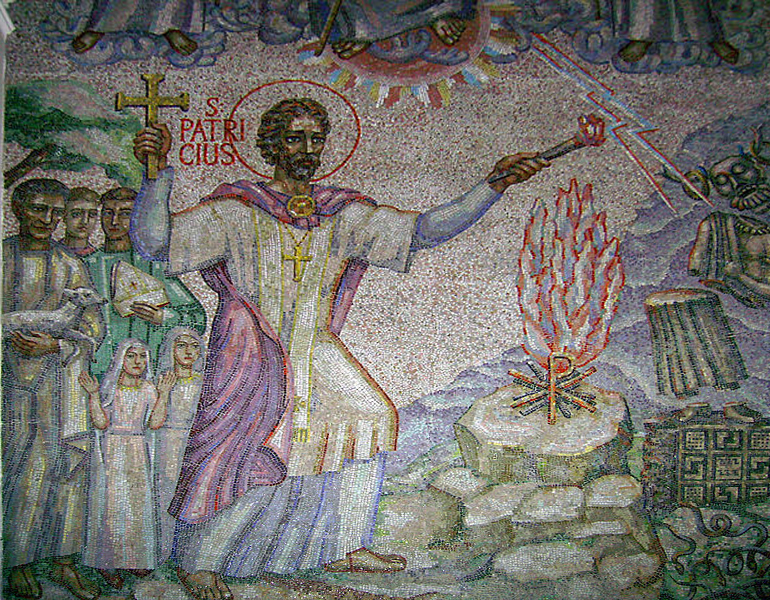
A mosaic of Saint Patrick in Cathedral of Christ the King, Mullingar, showing Patrick lighting the Easter fire at Slane and destroying pagan idols

Two works by late seventh-century hagiographers of Patrick have survived. These are the Vita sancti Patricii of Muirchú moccu Machtheni and the writings of Tírechán. Both writers relied upon an earlier work, now lost, the Book of Ultán. This Ultán, probably the same person as Ultan of Ardbraccan, was Tírechán's foster-father. His obituary is given in the Annals of Ulster under the year 657. These works thus date from a century and a half after Patrick's death.

The Patrick portrayed by Tírechán and Muirchu is a martial figure, who contests with druids, overthrows pagan idols, and curses kings and kingdoms. On occasion, their accounts contradict Patrick's own writings: Tírechán states that Patrick accepted gifts from female converts although Patrick himself flatly denies this. However, the emphasis Tírechán and Muirchu placed on female converts, and in particular royal and noble women who became nuns, is thought to be a genuine insight into Patrick's work of conversion. Patrick also worked with the unfree and the poor, encouraging them to vows of monastic chastity. Tírechán's account suggests that many early Patrician churches were combined with nunneries founded by Patrick's noble female converts.

The martial Patrick found in Tírechán and Muirchu, and in later accounts, echoes similar figures found during the conversion of the Roman Empire to Christianity. It may be doubted whether such accounts are an accurate representation of Patrick's time, although such violent events may well have occurred as Christians gained in strength and numbers.

Much of the detail supplied by Tírechán and Muirchu, in particular the churches established by Patrick, and the monasteries founded by his converts, may relate to the situation in the seventh century, when the churches which claimed ties to Patrick, and in particular Armagh, were expanding their influence throughout Ireland in competition with the church of Kildare. In the same period, Wilfred, Archbishop of York, claimed to speak, as metropolitan archbishop, "for all the northern part of Britain and of Ireland" at a council held in Rome in the time of Pope Agatho, thus claiming jurisdiction over the Irish church.

Muirchú's life of Saint Patrick contains a supposed prophecy by the druids which gives an impression of how Patrick and other Christian missionaries were seen by those hostile to them:

Across the sea will come Adze-head, crazed in the head,
his cloak with hole for the head, his stick bent in the head.
He will chant impieties from a table in the front of his house;
all his people will answer: "so be it, so be it."

Both Muirchú and Tírechán say that Patrick contended with Lóegaire mac Néill, the king of Tara. Muirchú includes a famous story that Patrick lit a Paschal (Easter) fire on the Hill of Slane, in defiance of the king. The story says that the fire could not be doused by anyone but Patrick.

Other presumed early materials include the Irish annals, which contain records from the Chronicle of Ireland. These sources have conflated Palladius and Patrick. Another early document is the so-called First Synod of Saint Patrick. This is a seventh-century document, once, but no longer, taken as to contain a fifth-century original text. It apparently collects the results of several early synods, and represents an era when pagans were still a major force in Ireland. The introduction attributes it to Patrick, Auxilius, and Iserninus, a claim which "cannot be taken at face value."

== Legends ==
=== Patrick uses shamrock in an illustrative parable ===
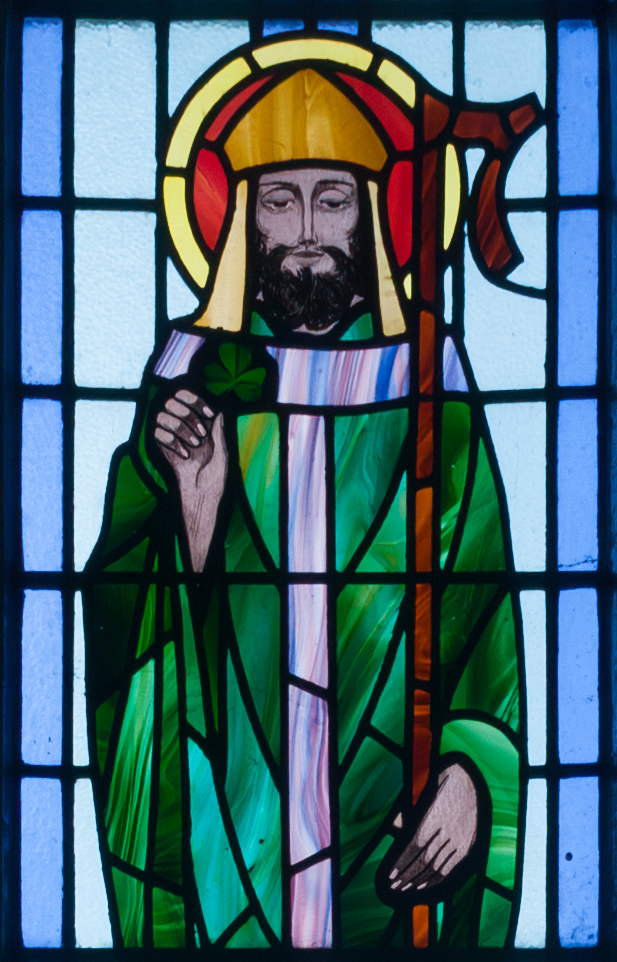
Patrick depicted with shamrock in detail of stained glass window in St. Benin's Church, Kilbennan, County Galway, Ireland

Legend credits Patrick with teaching the Irish about the doctrine of the Holy Trinity by showing people the shamrock, a three-leafed plant, using it to illustrate the Christian teaching of three persons in one God. The earliest written version of the story is given by the botanist Caleb Threlkeld in his 1726 Synopsis stirpium Hibernicarum, but the earliest surviving records associating Patrick with the plant are coins depicting Patrick clutching a shamrock which were minted in the 1680s.

In pagan Ireland, three was a significant number and the Irish had many triple deities, a fact that may have aided Patrick in his evangelisation efforts when he "held up a shamrock and discoursed on the Christian Trinity". Patricia Monaghan says there is no evidence that the shamrock was sacred to the pagan Irish. However, Jack Santino speculates that it may have represented the regenerative powers of nature, and was recast in a Christian context. Icons of St Patrick often depict the saint "with a cross in one hand and a sprig of shamrocks in the other". Roger Homan writes, "We can perhaps see St Patrick drawing upon the visual concept of the triskele when he uses the shamrock to explain the Trinity".

=== Patrick banishes snakes from Ireland ===
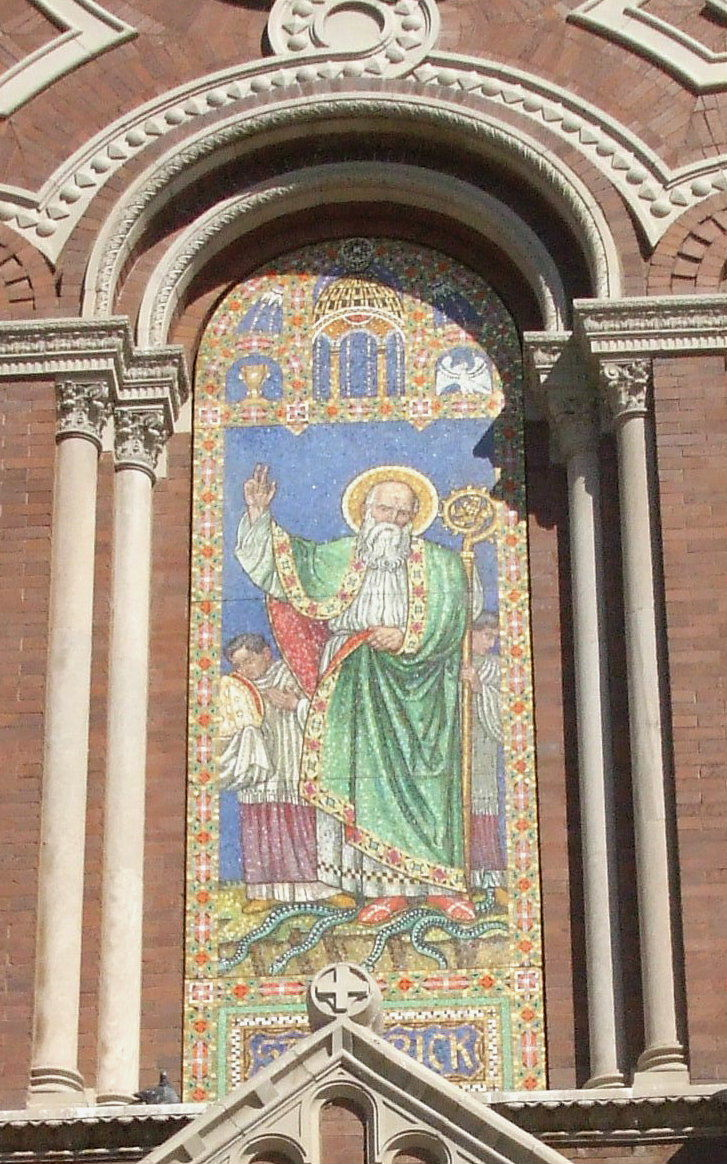
Patrick banishing the snakes

Ireland was well known to be a land without snakes, and this was noted as early as the third century by Gaius Julius Solinus, but later legend credited Patrick with banishing snakes from the island. The earliest text to mention an Irish saint banishing snakes from Ireland is in fact the Life of Saint Columba (chapter 3.23), written in the late seventh or early eighth century. The earliest writings about Patrick ridding Ireland of snakes are by Jocelyn of Furness in the late twelfth century, who says that Patrick chased them into the sea after they attacked him during his fast on a mountain. Gerald of Wales also mentions the story in the early thirteenth century, but he is doubtful of its truthfulness. Post-glacial Ireland never had snakes. "At no time has there ever been any suggestion of snakes in Ireland, so [there was] nothing for St. Patrick to banish", says naturalist Nigel Monaghan, keeper of natural history at the National Museum of Ireland in Dublin, who has searched extensively through Irish fossil collections and records.

=== Patrick's fast on the mountain ===
Tírechán wrote in the 7th century that Patrick spent forty days on the mountaintop of Cruachán Aigle, as Moses did on Mount Sinai. The 9th century Bethu Phátraic says that Patrick was harassed by a flock of black demonic birds while on the peak, and he banished them into the hollow of Lugnademon ("hollow of the demons") by ringing his bell. Patrick ended his fast when God gave him the right to judge all the Irish at the Last Judgement, and agreed to spare Ireland from the final desolation. A later legend tells how Patrick was tormented on the mountain by a demonic female serpent named Corra or Caorthannach. Patrick is said to have banished the serpent into Lough Na Corra below the mountain, or into a hollow from which the lake burst forth. The mountain is now known as Croagh Patrick (Cruach Phádraig) after the saint.

=== Patrick and Dáire ===
According to tradition, Patrick founded his main church at Armagh (Ard Mhacha) in the year 445. Muirchú writes that a pagan chieftain named Dáire would not let Patrick build a church on the hill of Ard Mhacha, but instead gave him lower ground to the east. One day, Dáire's horses die after grazing on the church land. He tells his men to kill Patrick, but is himself struck down with illness. Dáire's men beg Patrick to heal him, and Patrick's holy water revives both Dáire and his horses. Dáire rewards Patrick with a great bronze cauldron and gave him the hill of Ard Mhacha to build a church, which eventually became the head church of Ireland. Dáire has similarities with the Dagda, an Irish god who owns a cauldron of plenty.

In a later legend, the pagan chieftain is named Crom. Patrick asks the chieftain for food, and Crom sends his bull, in the hope that it will drive off or kill Patrick. Instead, it meekly submits to Patrick, allowing itself to be slaughtered and eaten. Crom demands his bull be returned. Patrick has the bull's bones and hide put together and brings it back to life. In some versions, Crom is so impressed that he converts to Christianity, while in others he is killed by the bull. In parts of Ireland, Lughnasa (1 August) is called 'Crom's Sunday' and the legend could recall bull sacrifices during the festival.

=== Patrick speaks with ancient Irish ancestors ===
The twelfth-century work Acallam na Senórach tells of Patrick being met by two ancient warriors, Caílte mac Rónáin and Oisín, during his evangelical travels. The two were once members of Fionn mac Cumhaill's warrior band the Fianna, and somehow survived to Patrick's time. In the work St. Patrick seeks to convert the warriors to Christianity, while they defend their pagan past. The heroic pagan lifestyle of the warriors, of fighting and feasting and living close to nature, is contrasted with the more peaceful, but unheroic and non-sensual life offered by Christianity.

=== Patrick and the innkeeper ===
A much later legend tells of Patrick visiting an inn and chiding the innkeeper for being ungenerous with her guests. Patrick tells her that a demon is hiding in her cellar and being fattened by her dishonesty. He says that the only way to get rid of the demon is by mending her ways. Sometime later, Patrick revisits the inn to find that the innkeeper is now serving her guests cups of whiskey filled to the brim. He praises her generosity and brings her to the cellar, where they find the demon withering away. It then flees in a flash of flame, and Patrick decrees that people should have a drink of whiskey on his feast day in memory of this. This is said to be the origin of "drowning the shamrock" on Saint Patrick's Day.

=== Battle for the body of St Patrick ===
According to the Annals of the Four Masters, an early-modern compilation of earlier annals, his corpse soon became an object of conflict in the Battle for the Body of Saint Patrick (Cath Coirp Naomh Padraic):

The Uí Néill and the Airgíalla attempted to bring it to Armagh; the Ulaid tried to keep it for themselves.

When the Uí Néill and the Airgíalla came to a certain water, the river swelled against them so that they were not able to cross it. When the flood had subsided the Ui Neill and the Ulaid united on terms of peace, to bring the body of Patrick with them. It appeared to each of them that each had the body conveying it to their respective territories. The body of Patrick was afterwards interred at Dun Da Lethglas with great honour and veneration; and during the twelve nights that the religious seniors were watching the body with psalms and hymns, it was not night in Magh Inis or the neighbouring lands, as they thought, but as if it were the full undarkened light of day.

== Modern theories ==
=== "Two Patricks" theory ===
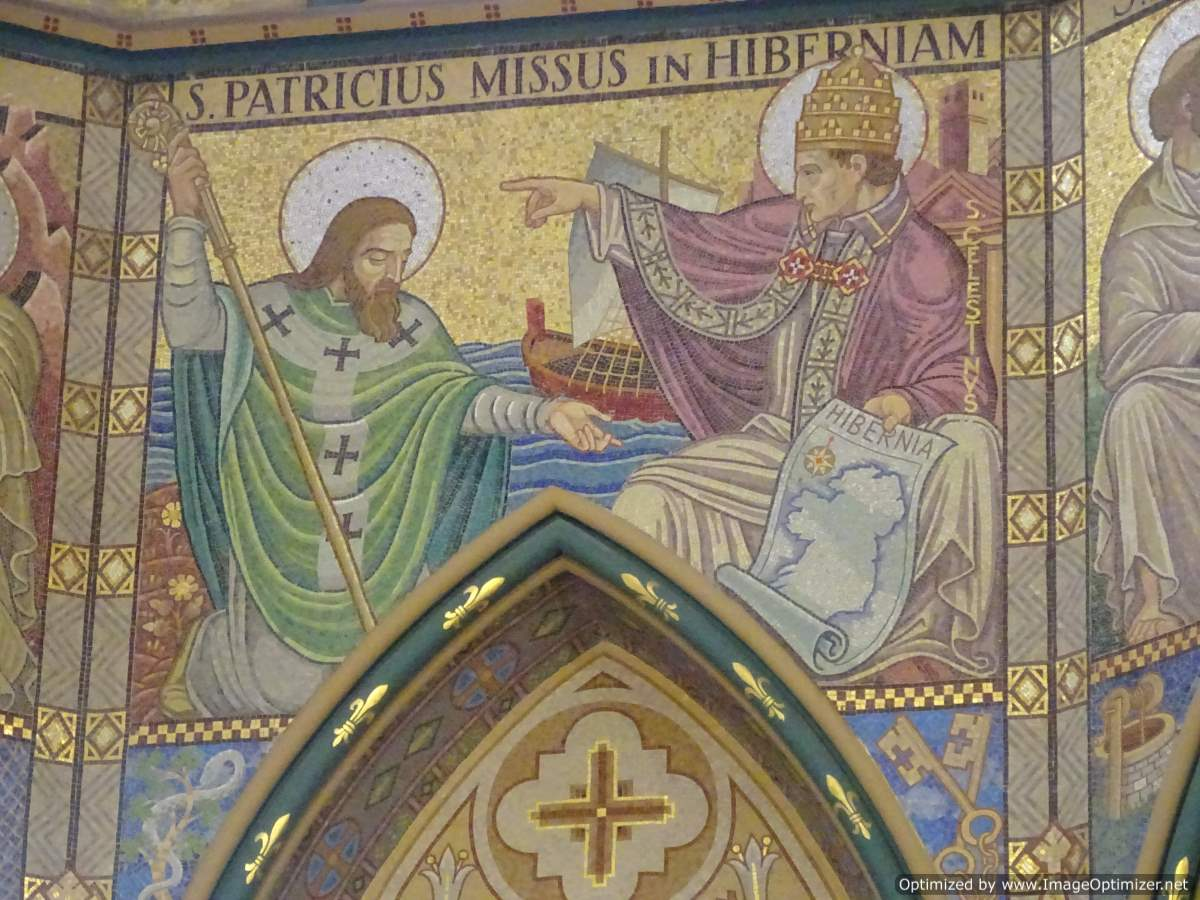
Saint Patrick sent to Ireland by the Pope; wall mosaic in St Mary's Cathedral, Kilkenny. Emphasising the supposed papal mission of Patrick would help lend credence to the Catholic teaching that the Irish church was always under Papal authority.

Irish academic T. F. O'Rahilly proposed the "Two Patricks" theory, which suggests that many of the traditions later attached to Saint Patrick actually concerned the aforementioned Palladius, who, according to Prosper of Aquitaine's Chronicle, was sent by Pope Celestine I as the first bishop to Irish Christians in 431. An early document which is silent concerning Patrick is the letter of Columbanus to Pope Boniface IV of about 613. Columbanus writes that Ireland's Christianity "was first handed to us by you, the successors of the holy apostles", apparently referring to Palladius only, and ignoring Patrick. Palladius was not the only early cleric in Ireland at this time. The Irish-born Saint Ciarán of Saigir lived in the later fourth century (352–402) and was the first bishop of Ossory. Ciaran, along with saints Auxilius, Secundinus and Iserninus, is also associated with early churches in Munster and Leinster. By this reading, Palladius was active in Ireland until the 460s.

Prosper associates Palladius' appointment with the visits of Germanus of Auxerre to Britain to suppress Pelagianism and it has been suggested that Palladius and his colleagues were sent to Ireland to ensure that exiled Pelagians did not establish themselves among the Irish Christians. The appointment of Palladius and his fellow bishops was not obviously a mission to convert the Irish, but more probably intended to minister to existing Christian communities in Ireland. The sites of churches associated with Palladius and his colleagues are close to royal centres of the period: Secundus is remembered by Dunshaughlin, County Meath, close to the Hill of Tara which is associated with the High King of Ireland; Killashee, County Kildare, close to Naas with links with the kings of Leinster, is probably named for Auxilius. This activity was limited to the southern half of Ireland, and there is no evidence for them in Ulster or Connacht.

Although the evidence for contacts with Gaul is clear, the borrowings from Latin into Old Irish show that links with Roman Britain were many. Iserninus, who appears to be of the generation of Palladius, is thought to have been a Briton, and is associated with the lands of the Uí Ceinnselaig in Leinster. The Palladian mission should not be contrasted with later "British" missions, but forms a part of them; nor can the work of Palladius be uncritically equated with that of Saint Patrick, as was once traditional.

=== Abduction reinterpreted ===
According to Patrick's own account, it was Irish raiders who brought him to Ireland where he was enslaved and held captive for six years. However, a recent alternative interpretation by Roy Flechner of Patrick's departure to Ireland suggests that, as the son of a decurion, he would have been obliged by Roman law to serve on the town council (curia), but chose instead to abscond from the onerous obligations of this office by fleeing abroad, as many others in his position had done in what has become known as the 'flight of the curiales'. Flechner also asserts the improbability of an escape from servitude and a journey of the kind that Patrick purports to have undertaken. He also interprets the biblical allusions in Patrick's account (e.g. the theme of freedom after six years of servitude in Exod. 21:2 or Jer. 34:14), as implying parts of the account may not have been intended to be understood literally.

== Sainthood and veneration ==
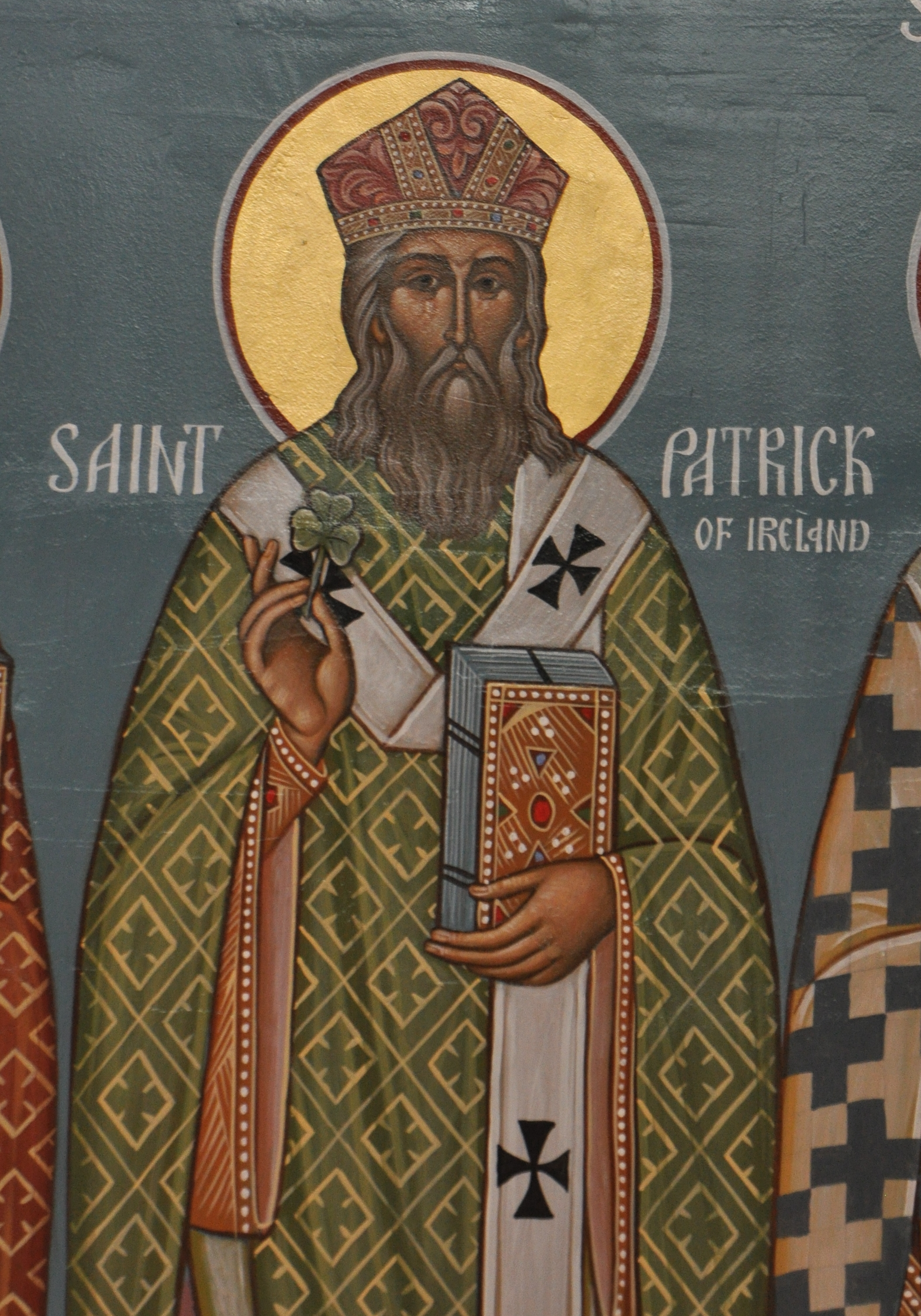
Icon of Saint Patrick from Christ the Savior Russian Orthodox Church, Wayne, West Virginia

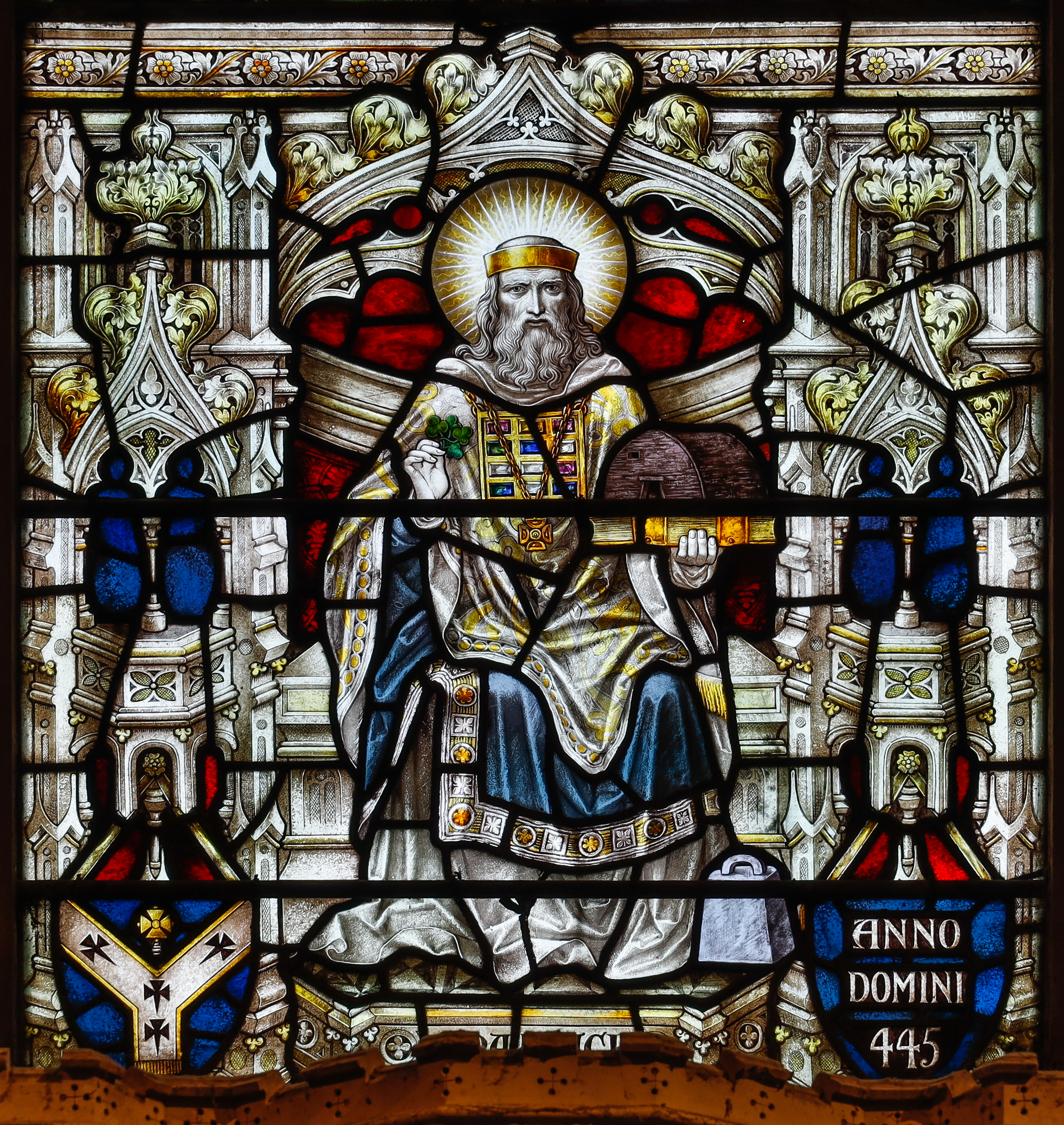
Stained glass window of Saint Patrick from the Protestant Church of Ireland cathedral in Armagh

Writing on the Easter controversy in 632 or 633, Cummian—it is uncertain whether this is Cumméne Fota or Cumméne Find—refers to Patrick as "our papa", that is, father or primate.

17 March, popularly known as Saint Patrick's Day, is believed to be his death date and is the date celebrated as his Feast Day. The day became a feast day in the Catholic Church due to the influence of the Waterford-born Franciscan scholar Luke Wadding, as a member of the commission for the reform of the Breviary in the early part of the 17th century.

For most of Christianity's first thousand years, canonisations were done on the diocesan or regional level. Relatively soon after the death of people considered very holy, the local Church affirmed that they could be liturgically celebrated as saints. As a result, Patrick has never been formally canonised by a pope (common before 10th century); nevertheless, various Christian churches declare that he is a saint in Heaven (see List of Saints). He is still widely venerated in Ireland and elsewhere today.

Patrick is also honoured with a feast day on the liturgical calendar of the Episcopal Church (USA) and with a commemoration on the calendar of Evangelical Lutheran Worship, both on 17 March. Patrick is also venerated in the Eastern Orthodox Church as a pre-Schism Western saint, especially among Orthodox Christians living in Ireland and the Anglosphere; as is usual with saints, there are Orthodox icons dedicated to him.

Saint Patrick remains a recurring figure in Folk Christianity and Irish folktales.

Patrick is said to be buried at Down Cathedral in Downpatrick, County Down, alongside Saint Brigid and Saint Columba, although this has never been proven. Saint Patrick Visitor Centre is a modern exhibition complex located in Downpatrick and is a permanent interpretative exhibition centre featuring interactive displays on the life and story of Patrick. It provides the only permanent exhibition centre in the world devoted to Patrick.

Patrick is remembered in the Church of England with a Lesser Festival on 17 March.

On 9 March 2017, his name was added to the Russian Orthodox Church calendar by the Holy Synod of the Russian Orthodox Church.

=== Saint Patrick's Breastplate ===
Saint Patrick's Breastplate is a lorica, or hymn, which is attributed to Patrick during his Irish ministry in the 5th century.

=== Saint Patrick's crosses ===
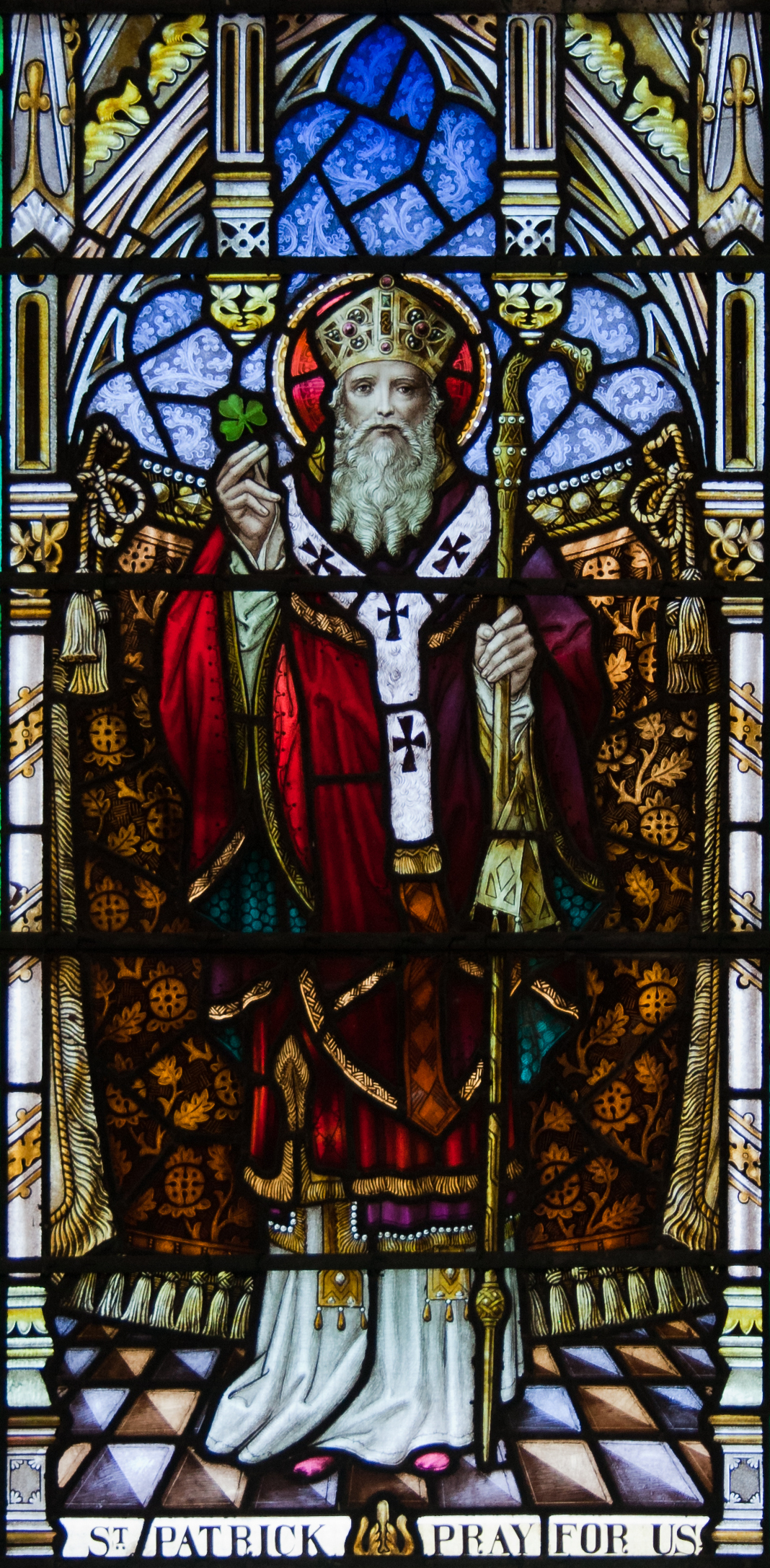
Patrick showing cross pattée on his robes

There are two main types of crosses associated with Patrick, the cross pattée and the Saltire. The cross pattée is the more traditional association, while the association with the saltire dates from 1783 and the Order of St. Patrick.

The cross pattée has long been associated with Patrick, for reasons that are uncertain. One possible reason is that bishops' mitres in Ecclesiastical heraldry often appear surmounted by a cross pattée. An example of this can be seen on the old crest of the Brothers of St. Patrick. As Patrick was the founding bishop of the Irish church, the symbol may have become associated with him. Patrick is traditionally portrayed in the vestments of a bishop, and his mitre and garments are often decorated with a cross pattée.

The cross pattée retains its link to Patrick to the present day. For example, it appears on the coat of arms of both the Roman Catholic Archdiocese of Armagh and the Church of Ireland Archdiocese of Armagh. This is on account of Patrick being regarded as the first bishop of the Diocese of Armagh. It is also used by Down District Council which has its headquarters in Downpatrick, the reputed burial place of Patrick.

Saint Patrick's Saltire is a red saltire on a white field. It is used in the insignia of the Order of Saint Patrick, established in 1783, and after the Acts of Union 1800 it was combined with the Saint George's Cross of England and the Saint Andrew's Cross of Scotland to form the Union Flag of the United Kingdom of Great Britain and Ireland. A saltire was intermittently used as a symbol of Ireland from the seventeenth century but without reference to Patrick.

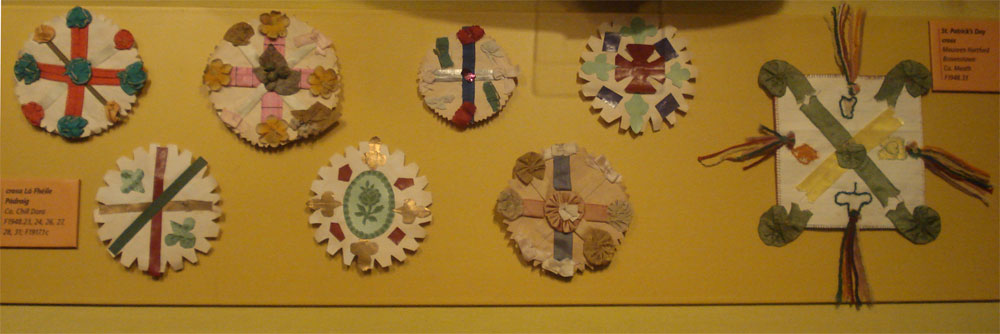
Traditional Saint Patrick's Day badges from the early twentieth century, from the Museum of Country Life, Castlebar

It was formerly a common custom to wear a cross made of paper or ribbon on St Patrick's Day. Surviving examples of such badges come in many colours and they were worn upright rather than as saltires.

Thomas Dinely, an English traveller in Ireland in 1681, remarked that "the Irish of all stations and condicõns were crosses in their hatts, some of pins, some of green ribbon." Jonathan Swift, writing to "Stella" of Saint Patrick's Day 1713, said "the Mall was so full of crosses that I thought all the world was Irish". In the 1740s, the badges pinned were multicoloured interlaced fabric. In the 1820s, they were only worn by children, with simple multicoloured daisy patterns. In the 1890s, they were almost extinct, and a simple green Greek cross inscribed in a circle of paper (similar to the Ballina crest pictured). The Irish Times in 1935 reported they were still sold in poorer parts of Dublin, but fewer than those of previous years "some in velvet or embroidered silk or poplin, with the gold paper cross entwined with shamrocks and ribbons".

=== Saint Patrick's Bell ===
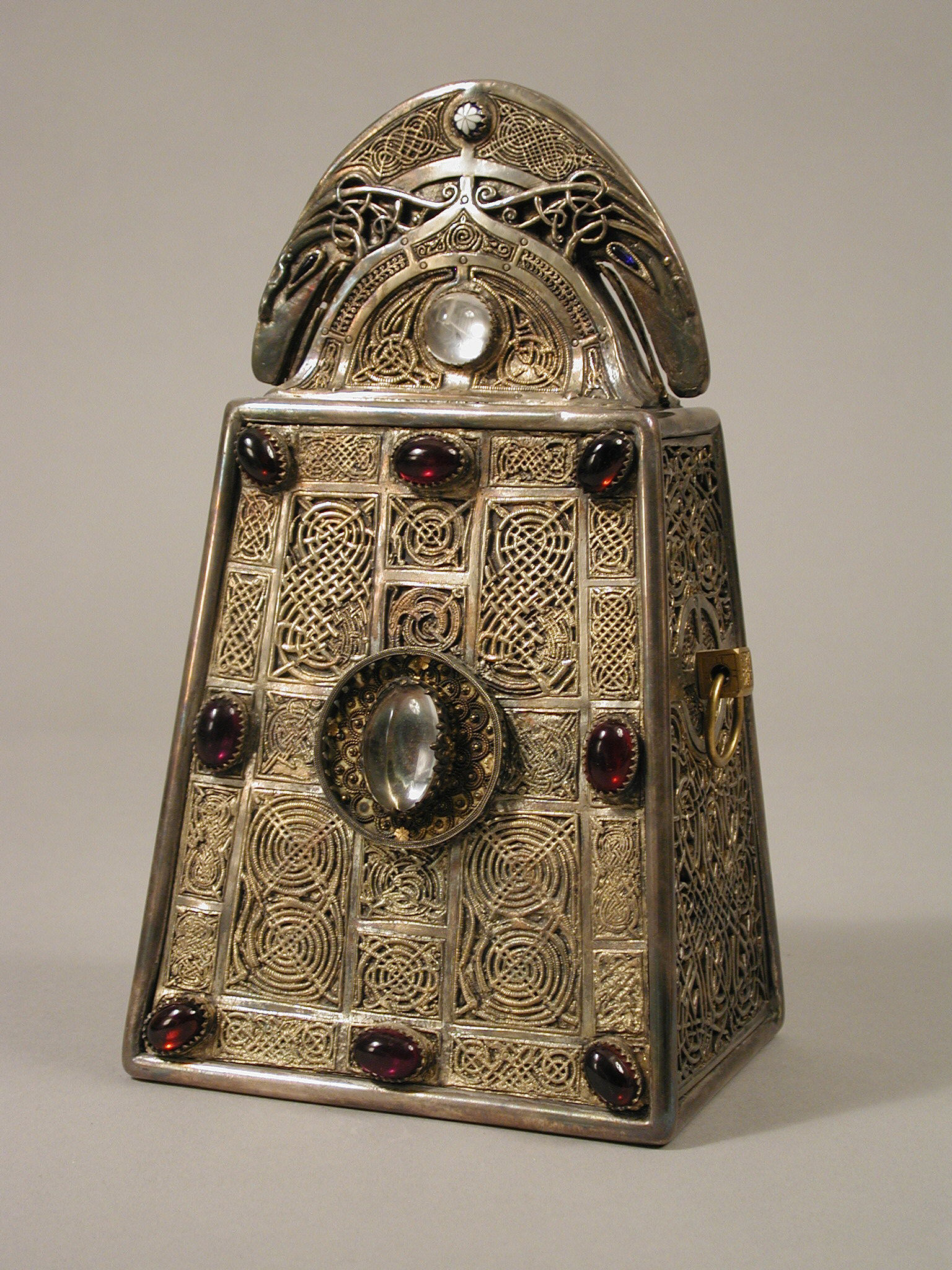
The Shrine of Saint Patrick's Bell

The National Museum of Ireland in Dublin possesses a bell (Clog Phádraig) (Note: The bell was formerly known as "The Bell of St Patrick's Will" (Clog an eadhachta Phatraic), in reference to a medieval forgery which purported to have been the saint's last will and testament.) first mentioned, according to the Annals of Ulster, in the Book of Cuanu in the year 552. The bell was part of a collection of "relics of Patrick" removed from his tomb sixty years after his death by Colum Cille to be used as relics. The bell is described as "The Bell of the Testament", one of three relics of "precious minna" (extremely valuable items), of which the other two are described as Patrick's goblet and "The Angels Gospel". Colum Cille is described to have been under the direction of an "Angel" for whom he sent the goblet to Down, the bell to Armagh, and kept possession of the Angel's Gospel for himself. The name Angels Gospel is given to the book because it was supposed that Colum Cille received it from the angel's hand. A stir was caused in 1044 when two kings, in some dispute over the bell, went on spates of prisoner taking and cattle theft. The annals make one more apparent reference to the bell when chronicling a death, of 1356: "Solomon Ua Mellain, The Keeper of The Bell of the Testament, protector, rested in Christ."

The bell was encased in a "bell shrine", a distinctive Irish type of reliquary made for it, as an inscription records, by King Domnall Ua Lochlainn sometime between 1091 and 1105. The shrine is an important example of the final, Viking-influenced, style of Irish Celtic art, with intricate Urnes style decoration in gold and silver. The Gaelic inscription on the shrine also records the name of the maker "U INMAINEN" (which translates to "Noonan"), "who with his sons enriched/decorated it"; metalwork was often inscribed for remembrance.

The bell itself is simple in design, hammered into shape with a small handle fixed to the top with rivets. Originally forged from iron, it has since been coated in bronze. The shrine is inscribed with three names, including King Domnall Ua Lochlainn's. The rear of the shrine, not intended to be seen, is decorated with crosses while the handle is decorated with, among other works, Celtic designs of birds. The bell is accredited with working a miracle in 1044, and having been coated in bronze to shield it from human eyes, for which it would be too holy. It measures 12.5 × 10 cm at the base, 12.8 × 4 cm at the shoulder, 16.5 cm from base to shoulder, 3.3 cm from shoulder to top of the handle and weighs 1.7 kg.

=== Saint Patrick and Irish identity ===
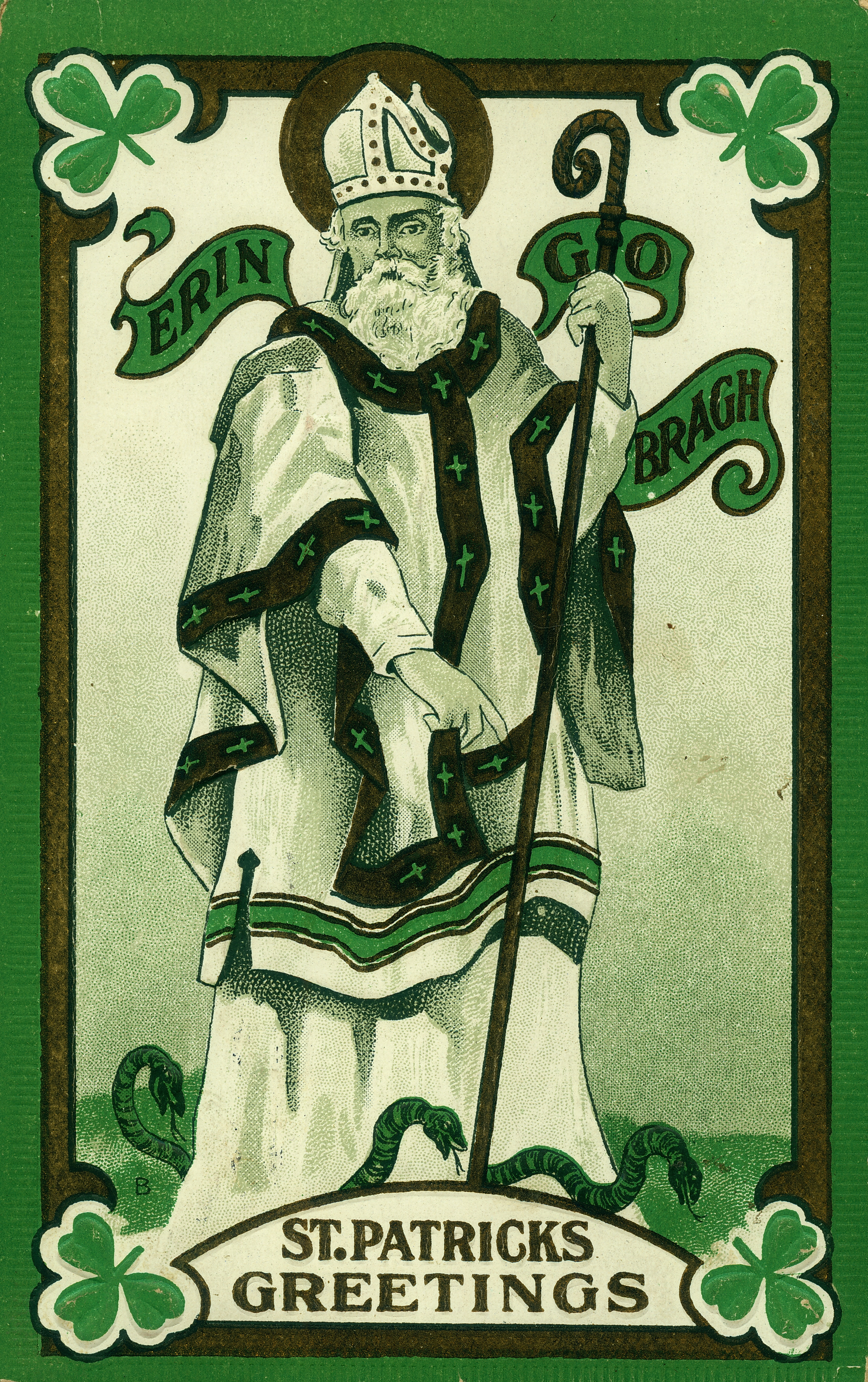
A 1909 St Patrick's Day postcard with the Irish slogan "Erin go bragh" (Ireland Forever)

Patrick features in many stories in the Irish oral tradition and there are many customs connected with his feast day. The folklorist Jenny Butler discusses how these traditions have been given new layers of meaning over time while also becoming tied to Irish identity both in Ireland and abroad. The symbolic resonance of the Saint Patrick figure is complex and multifaceted, stretching from that of Christianity's arrival in Ireland to an identity that encompasses everything Irish. In some portrayals, the saint is symbolically synonymous with the Christian religion itself. There is also evidence of a combination of indigenous religious traditions with that of Christianity, which places St Patrick in the wider framework of cultural hybridity. Popular religious expression has this characteristic feature of merging elements of culture. Later in time, the saint became associated specifically with Catholic Ireland and synonymously with Irish national identity. Subsequently, Saint Patrick is a patriotic symbol along with the colour green and the shamrock. Saint Patrick's Day celebrations include many traditions that are known to be relatively recent historically but have endured through time because of their association either with religious or national identity. They have persisted in such a way that they have become stalwart traditions, viewed as the strongest "Irish traditions".

== Places associated with Saint Patrick ==
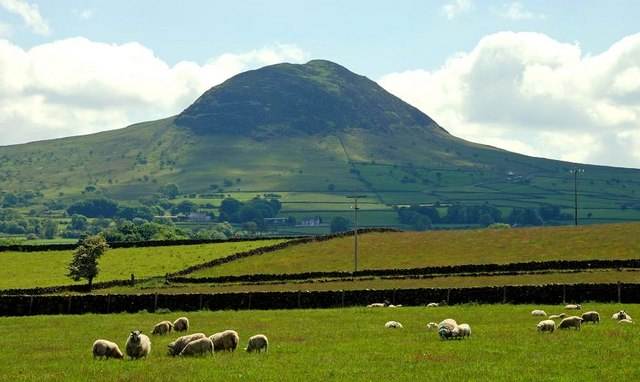
Slemish, County Antrim, traditionally associated with Saint Patrick's time as a shepherd slave

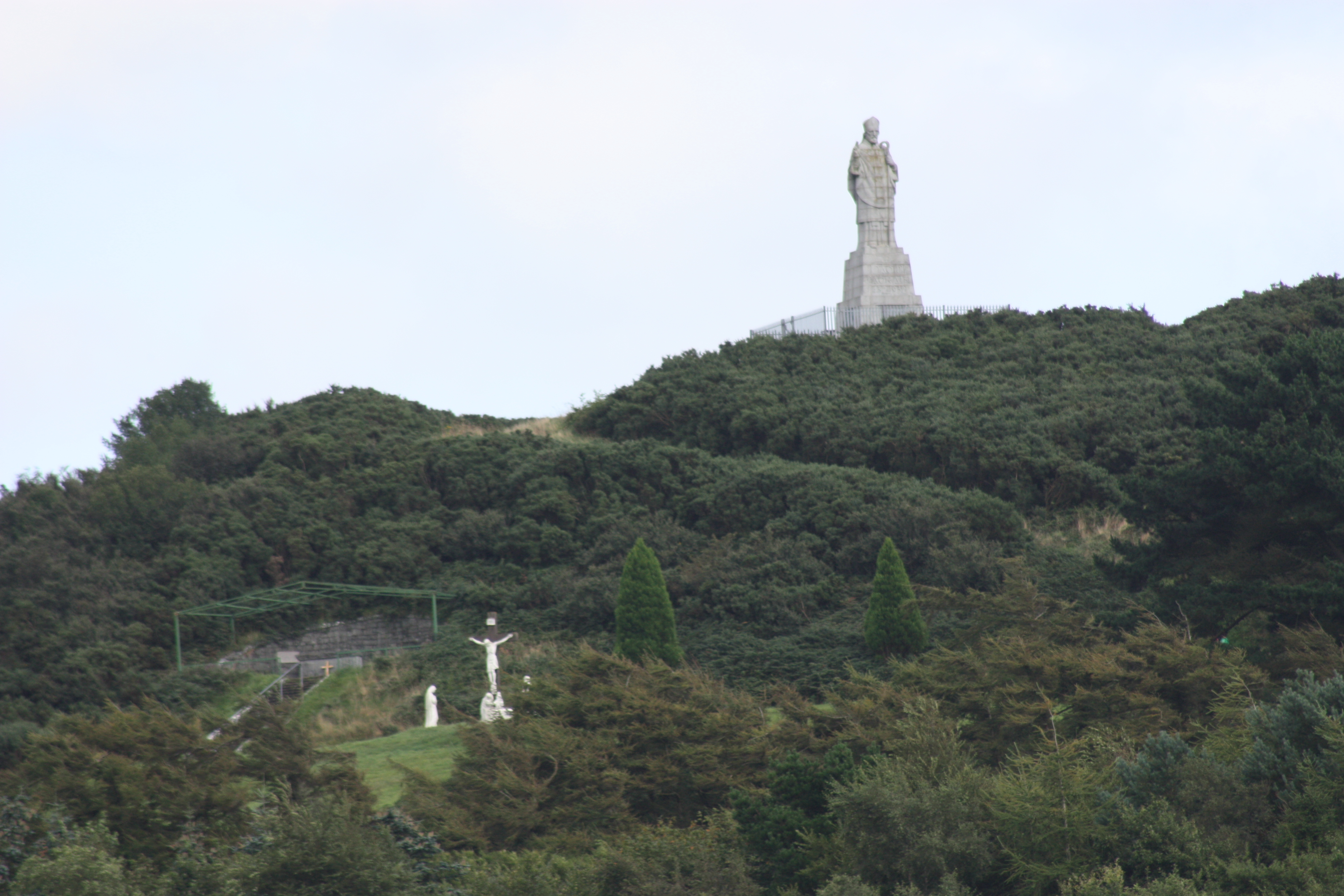
Saint Patrick's statue at Saul, County Down

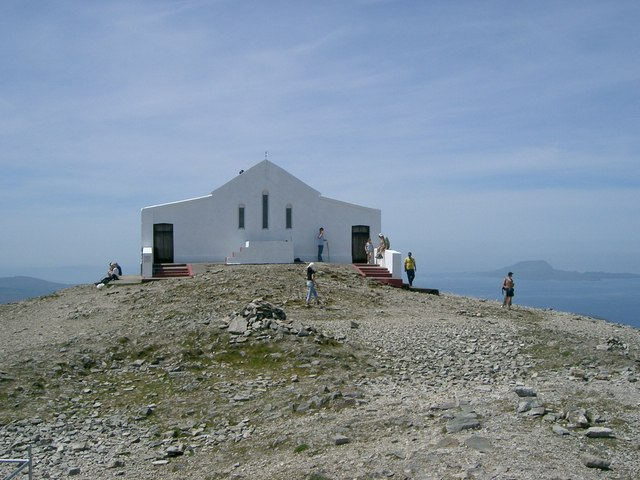
Saint Patrick's Oratory at the top of Croagh Patrick, County Mayo

- Slemish, County Antrim and Killala Bay, County Mayo: When captured by raiders, there are two theories as to where Patrick was enslaved. One theory is that he herded sheep in the countryside around Slemish. Another theory is that Patrick herded sheep near Killala Bay, at a place called Fochill.
- Saul Monastery (from Irish Sabhall Phádraig, meaning 'Patrick's barn'): It is claimed that Patrick founded his first church in a barn at Saul, which was donated to him by a local chieftain called Dichu. It is also claimed that Patrick died at Saul or was brought there between his death and burial. Nearby, on the crest of Slieve Patrick, is a huge statue of Patrick with bronze panels showing scenes from his life.
- Croagh Patrick, County Mayo (from Irish Cruach Phádraig, meaning 'Patrick's stack'): It is claimed that Patrick climbed this mountain and fasted on its summit for the forty days of Lent. Croagh Patrick draws thousands of pilgrims who make the trek to the top on the last Sunday in July.
- Lough Derg, County Donegal (from Irish Loch Dearg, meaning 'red lake'): It is claimed that Patrick killed a large serpent on this lake and that its blood turned the water red (hence the name). Each August, pilgrims spend three days fasting and praying there on Station Island. Located on the island is St Patrick's Purgatory which has been considered as the entrance to Purgatory since the Middle Ages.
- Armagh: It is claimed that Patrick founded a church here and proclaimed it to be the most holy church in Ireland. Armagh is today the primary seat of both the Catholic Church in Ireland and the Church of Ireland, and both cathedrals in the town are named after Patrick.
- Downpatrick, County Down (from Irish Dún Pádraig, meaning 'Patrick's stronghold'): It is claimed that Patrick was brought here after his death and buried in the grounds of Down Cathedral.
- Glastonbury Abbey, England: It is claimed that he was buried within the Abbey grounds next to the high altar, which has led to many believing this is why Glastonbury was popular among Irish pilgrims. It is also believed that he was 'the founder and the first Abbot of Glastonbury Abbey.' This was recorded by William of Malmesbury in his document "De antiquitate Glastoniensis ecclesiae (Concerning the Antiquity of Glastonbury)" that was compiled between 1129 and 1135, where it was noted that "After converting the Irish and establishing them solidly in the Catholic faith he returned to his native land, and was led by guidance from on high to Glastonbury. There he came upon certain holy men living the life of hermits. Finding themselves all of one mind with Patrick they decided to form a community and elected him as their superior. Later, two of their members resided on the Tor to serve its Chapel." Within the grounds of the Abbey lies St. Patrick's Chapel, Glastonbury which is a site of pilgrimage. The well-known Irish Scholar James Carney also elaborated on this claim and wrote "it is possible that Patrick, tired and ill at the end of his arduous mission felt released from his vow not to leave Ireland, and returned to the monastery from which he had come, which might have been Glastonbury". It is also another possible burial site of the saint, where it is documented he has been "interred in the Old Wattle Church".

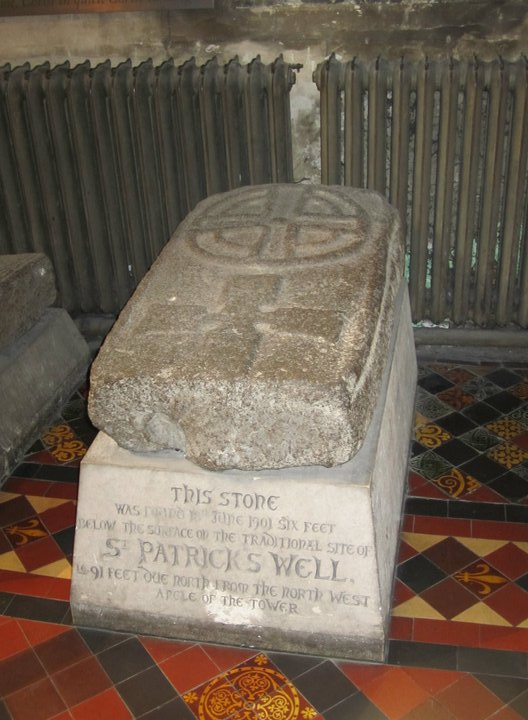
Stone found below St. Patrick's Well. St. Patrick's Cathedral, Dublin, Ireland.

Other places named after Saint Patrick include:

- Patrickswell Lane, a well in Drogheda Town where St. Patrick opened a monastery and baptised the townspeople.
- Ardpatrick, County Limerick (from Irish Ard Pádraig, meaning 'high place of Patrick')
- Patrick Water (Old Patrick Water), Elderslie, Renfrewshire. from Scots' Gaelic "AlltPadraig" meaning Patrick's Burn
- Patrickswell or Toberpatrick, County Limerick (from Irish Tobar Phádraig, meaning 'Patrick's well')
- St Patrick's Well, Patterdale
- Three churches in the Diocese of Carlisle are dedicated to St Patrick, they are all within the historic county of Westmorland: St Patrick's Patterdale, at the head of Ullswater (the present church was built in the 19th Century but the chapel in Patricksdale is mentioned in a charter of 1348); St Patrick's Bampton, near Shap; St Patrick's Church, Preston Patrick near Kirkby Lonsdale.
- St Patrick's Chapel, Heysham, a ruined chapel near St Peter's Church, Heysham, Lancashire. The chapel dates from the 8th Century.
- St Patrick's Island, County Dublin
- Old Kilpatrick, near Dumbarton, Scotland from "Cill Phàdraig," Patrick's Church, a claimant to his birthplace
- St Patrick's Isle, off the Isle of Man
- St. Patricks, Newfoundland and Labrador, a community in the Baie Verte district of Newfoundland
- Llanbadrig (church), Ynys Badrig (island), Porth Padrig (cove), Llyn Padrig (lake), and Rhosbadrig (heath) on the island of Anglesey in Wales
- Templepatrick, County Antrim (from Irish Teampall Phádraig, meaning 'Patrick's church')
- St Patrick's Hill, Liverpool, on old maps of the town near to the former location of "St Patrick's Cross"
- Parroquia San Patricio y Espiritu Santo, Loiza, Puerto Rico. The site was initially mentioned in 1645 as a chapel. The actual building was completed by 1729, is one of the oldest churches in the Americas and today represents the faith of many Irish immigrants that settled in Loiza by the end of the 18th century. Today it is a museum.

== In art ==
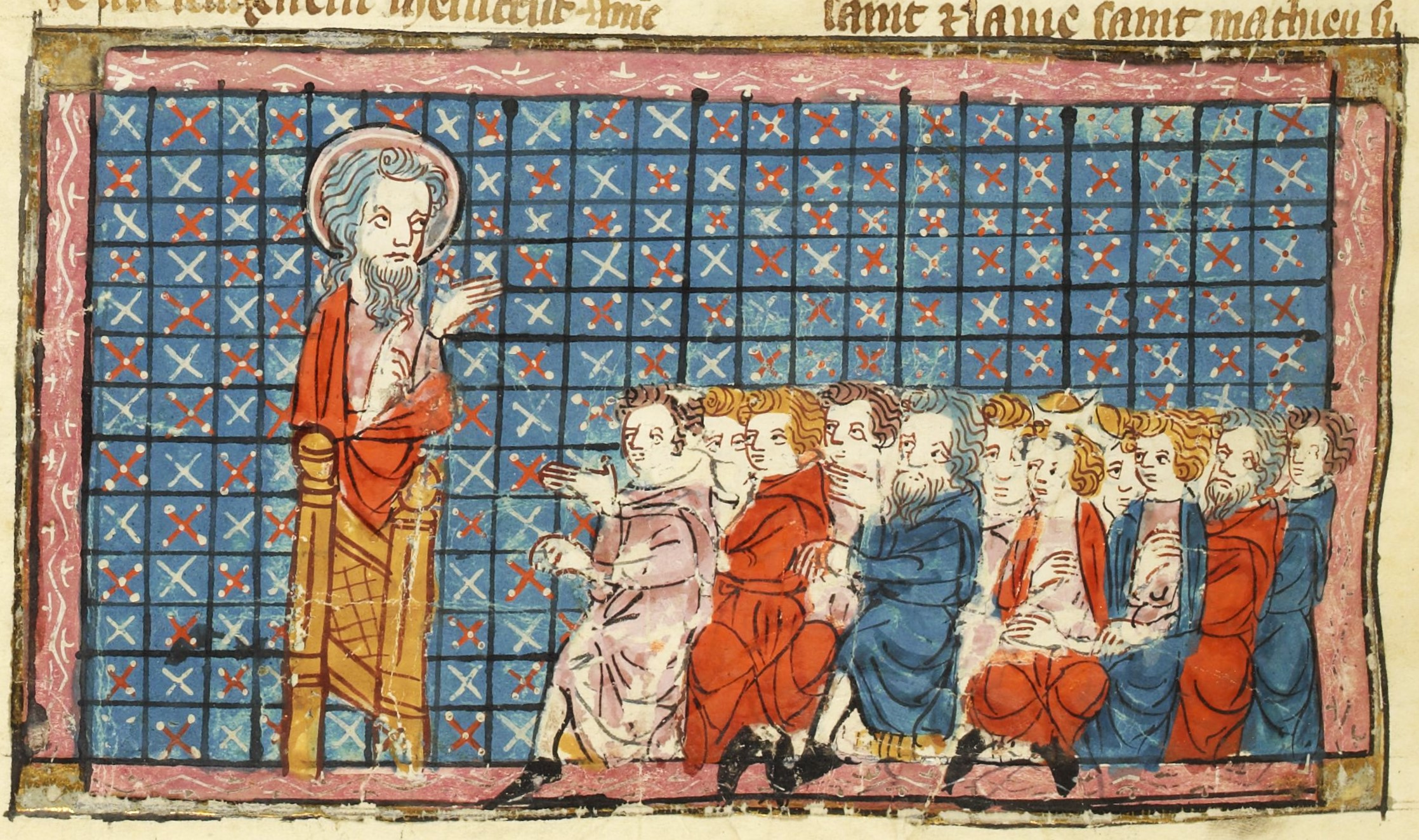
Jeanne de Montbaston, Saint Patrick Preaching (c. 1325–1350)

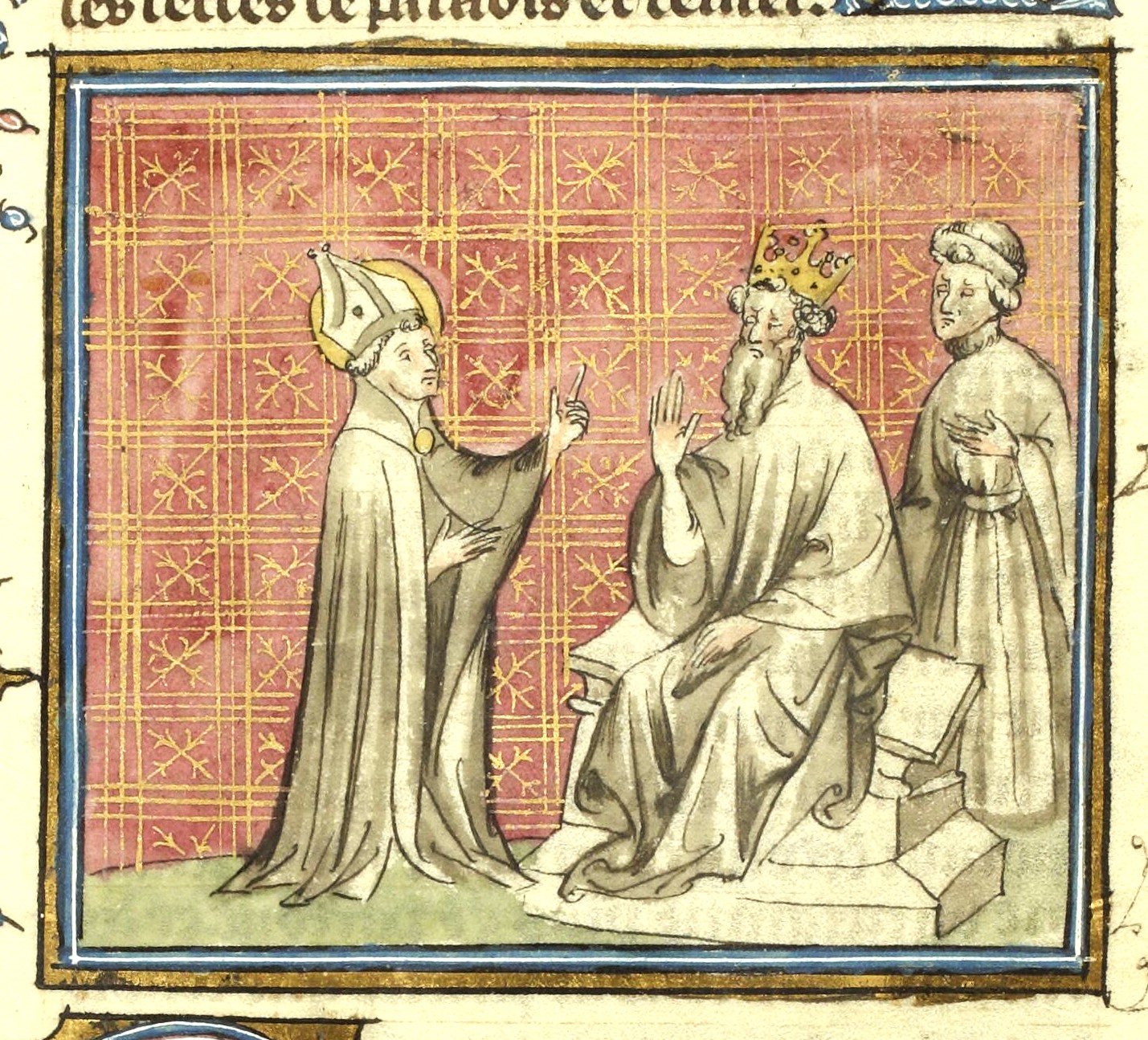
Richard de Montbaston, Saint Patrick and the King (1348)

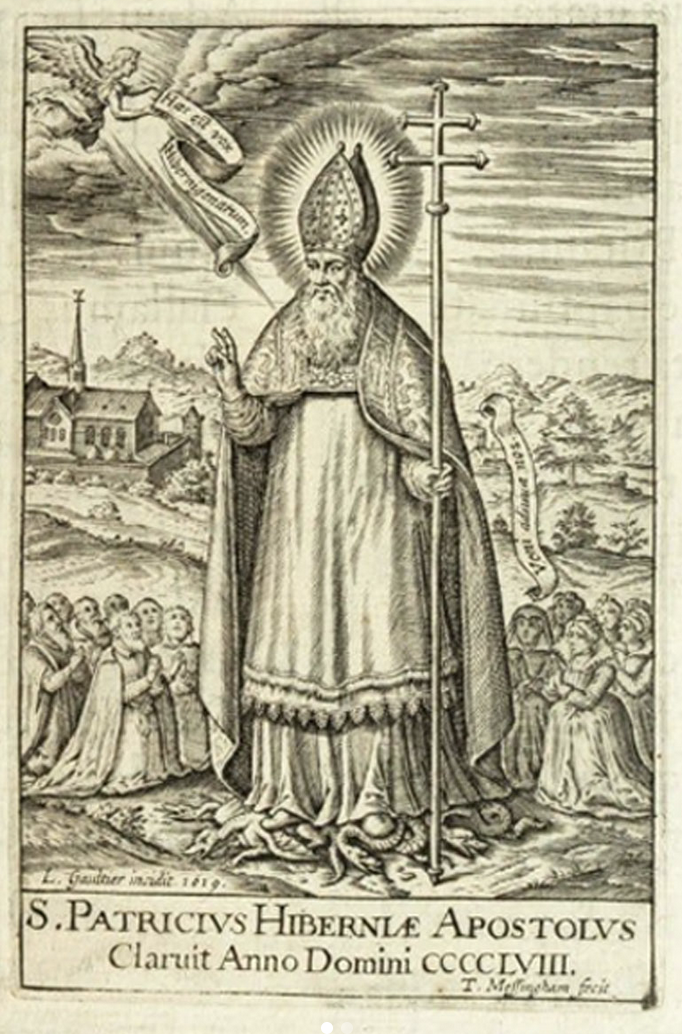
Thomas Messingham, Florilegum Insulae Sanctorum (1624)

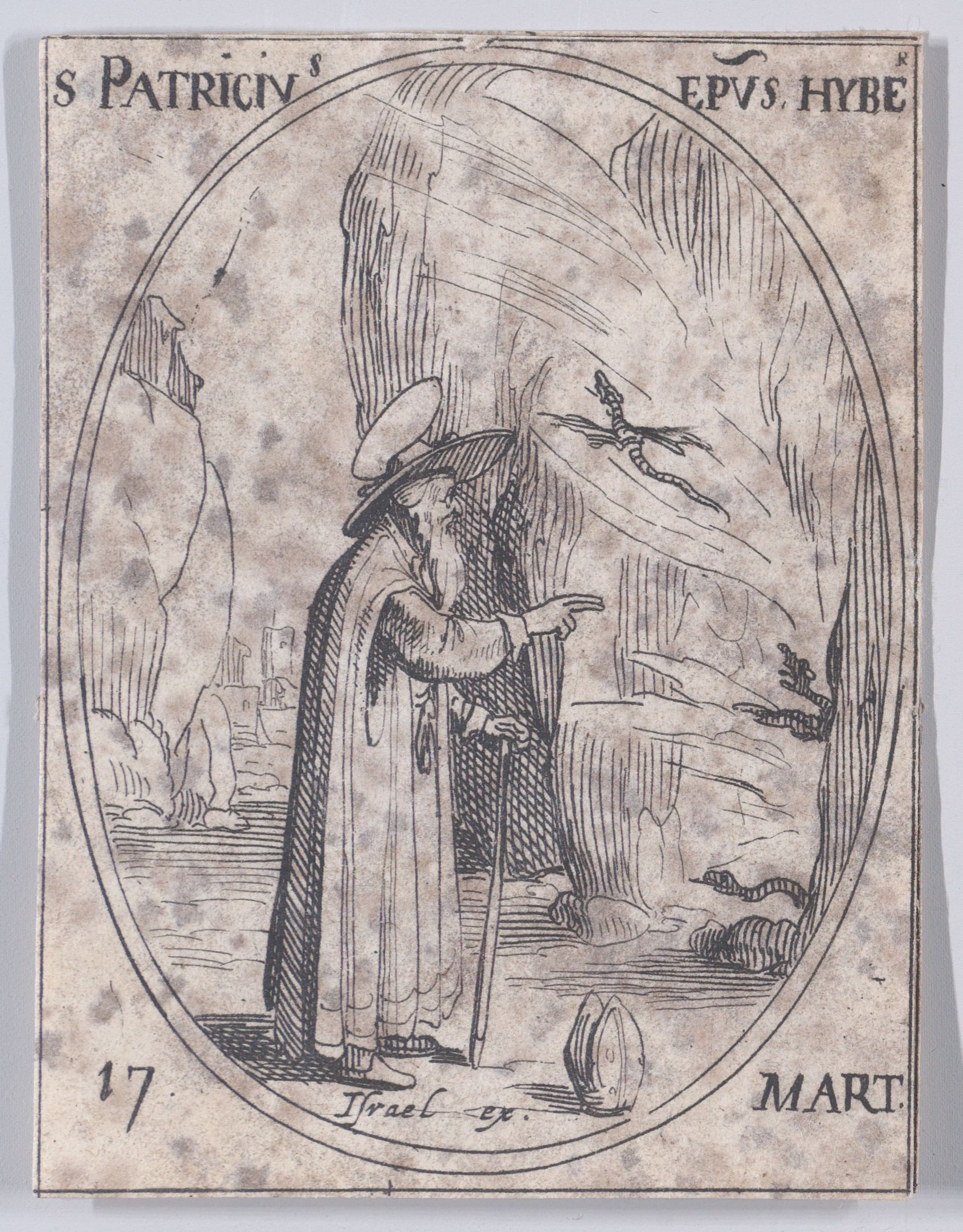
Jacques Callot, St. Patrick, Bishop of Ireland (1636)

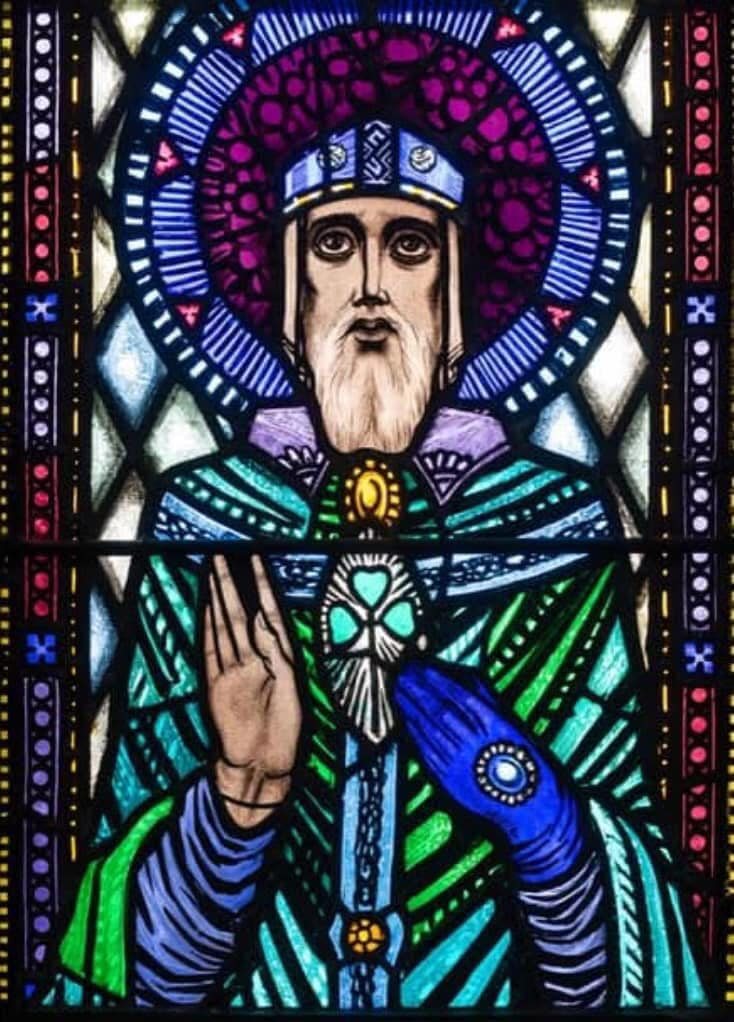
Harry Clarke, Saint Patrick (detail) (1925)

== In literature ==
- Pedro Calderón de la Barca wrote El Purgatorio de San Patricio in 1634.
- Robert Southey wrote a ballad called "Saint Patrick's Purgatory", first published in 1798, based on popular legends surrounding the saint's name.
- Patrick is mentioned in a 17th-century ballad about "Saint George and the Dragon"
- Stephen R. Lawhead wrote the fictional Patrick: Son of Ireland loosely based on the saint's life, including imagined accounts of training as a druid and service in the Roman army before his conversion.

== In film ==
- St. Patrick: The Irish Legend is a 2000 television historical drama film about the saint's life. Patrick is portrayed by Patrick Bergin.
- I am Patrick: The Patron Saint of Ireland is a 2020 film based on Patrick's own writings and the earliest traditions. Patrick is portrayed by Seán Ó Meallaigh, with Robert McCormack playing him when he is younger and John Rhys-Davies in later life.

== See also ==
- Saint Mun
- Saint Patrick, patron saint archive
- Saint Patrick's Breastplate
- Saint Patrick's Day
- Saint Patrick's saltire, cross and flag
- St Patrick halfpenny
- St Patrick's blue
- St Patrick's Purgatory
- St Patrick's Rock
- Saint Patrick’s Battalion

== Works cited ==
- Bury, John Bagnell (1905). Life of St. Patrick and His Place in History. London: Macmillan.
- Byrne, Francis J. (1973). Irish Kings and High-Kings. London: Batsford. ISBN 978-0-7134-5882-4.
- Charles-Edwards, T.M. (2000). Early Christian Ireland. Cambridge: Cambridge University Press. ISBN 978-0-521-36395-2.
- Dark, Ken (2000). Britain and the End of the Roman Empire. Stroud: Tempus. ISBN 978-0-7524-2532-0.
- Paor, Liam De (1993). Saint Patrick's World: The Christian Culture of Ireland's Apostolic Age. Dublin: Four Courts Press. ISBN 978-1-85182-144-0.
- Duffy, Seán, ed. (1997). Atlas of Irish History. Dublin: Gill and Macmillan. ISBN 978-0-7171-3093-1.
- Dumville, David M. (1993). Saint Patrick, AD 493–1993. Woodbridge: The Boydell Press. ISBN 978-0-85115-332-2.
- Flechner, Roy (2011). "Patrick's Reasons for Leaving Britain". In Russell, Edmonds (ed.). Tome: Studies in Medieval Celtic History and Law in Honour of Thomas Charles-Edwards. Woodbridge: Boydell Press. ISBN 978-1-84383-661-2.
- Flechner, Roy (2019). Saint Patrick Retold: The Legend and History of Ireland's Patron Saint. Princeton, NJ: Princeton University Press. ISBN 978-0691184647. Archived from the original on 11 June 2020.
- Fletcher, Richard (1997). The Conversion of Europe: From Paganism to Christianity 371–1386 AD. London: Harper Collins. ISBN 978-0-00-686302-1.
- Hood, A.B.E. (1978). St. Patrick: his Writings, and Muirchú's Life. London and Chichester: Phillimore. ISBN 978-0-85033-299-5.
- Ó Cróinín, Dáibhí (1995). Early Medieval Ireland: 400–1200. London: Longman. ISBN 978-0-582-01565-4.
- O'Rahilly, T. F. (1942). The Two Patricks: A Lecture on the History of Christianity in Fifth-Century Ireland. Dublin: Dublin Institute for Advanced Studies.
- Stancliffe, Claire (2004). "Patrick (fl. 5th cent.)". Oxford Dictionary of National Biography (online ed.). Oxford University Press. doi:10.1093/ref:odnb/21562. (Subscription, Wikipedia Library access or UK public library membership required.)
- Thomas, Charles (1981). Christianity in Roman Britain to AD 500. London: Batsford. ISBN 978-0-7134-1442-4.
- Thompson, E.A. (1980). Caird, G.B.; Chadwick, Henry (eds.). "St. Patrick and Coroticus". The Journal of Theological Studies. 31: 12–27. doi:10.1093/jts/XXXI.1.12. ISSN 0022-5185.
- White, Newport J.D. (1920). St. Patrick, His Writings and Life. New York: Macmillan. Archived from the original on 11 June 2020.
- Wood, Ian (2001). The Missionary Life: Saints and the Evangelisation of Europe 400–1050. London: Longman. ISBN 978-0-582-31213-5.
- Yorke, Barbara (2006). The Conversion of Britain: Religion, Politics and Society in Britain c. 600–800. London: Longman. ISBN 978-0-582-77292-2.
