= Slemish =

Mountain in County Antrim, Northern Ireland

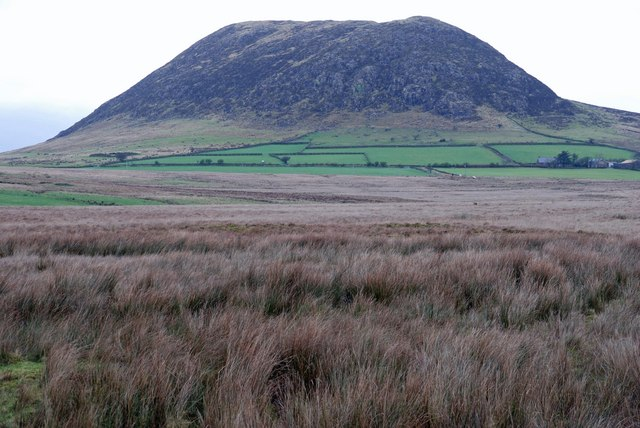

Highest point
- Elevation: 437 m (1,434 ft)
- Prominence: 150 m (490 ft)
- Listing: Marilyn
- Coordinates: 54°52′55″N 6°5′49″W

Naming
- Native name: Sliabh Mis
- English translation: Mis' Mountain

Geography
- Location within Northern Ireland
- Location: County Antrim, Northern Ireland
- Parent range: Antrim Hills
- OSI/OSNI grid: D221054

Geology
- Mountain type: Volcanic plug

Slemish, historically called Slieve Mish (from Irish Sliabh Mis, meaning 'Mis's mountain'), is a hill in County Antrim, Northern Ireland. It lies a few miles east of Ballymena, in the townland of Carnstroan. Tradition holds that Saint Patrick, enslaved as a youth, was brought to this area and tended sheep herds on Slemish, and that during this time he found God.

Slemish is the remains of the plug of an extinct volcano. The plug is made of olivine dolerite and was formed during the Palaeogene period of the Earth's geological history. Its distinctive appearance — its upper reaches are very steep and rugged, in contrast to the tidy fields on its lower westward-facing slopes and the relatively flat bogland to the east — causes it to dominate the landscape for miles around.

Slemish is within an Environmentally Sensitive Area (ESA) and, therefore, helps to protect and manage the fragile animal and plant communities that inhabit its slopes. An ideal location for bird watchers, large black ravens, buzzards, wheatears and meadow pipits can be seen regularly.

== History ==
Slemish Mountain is the legendary first known Irish home of Saint Patrick. According to legend, following his capture and being brought to Ireland as a slave, Patrick worked as a shepherd at Slemish Mountain for about six years, from ages 16 to 22, for a man named Milchu (or Miluic).

It was during this time that Patrick turned to frequent prayer as his only consolation in his loneliness. In a vision he heard the voice of an angel telling him to escape and return home to Britain.

He did this, then became a priest and returned to Ireland, allegedly to convert his old master. The legend goes that his own real conversion took place while on Slemish out in all weathers, communing with nature and praying continuously. As Patrick was not the first Christian Bishop to visit Ireland, his ministry was confined to the North. Here he established churches and an episcopal system. One such church is thought to have been founded at the nearby site of Skerry Churchyard.

In later times, Slemish was the site of a United Irish camp during the 1798 rebellion in County Antrim.

== Cultural significance ==
Saint Patrick's Day (17 March) large crowds walk to the top of the mountain as a pilgrimage.

== Literature ==
Slemish features in Dennis Kennedy's book Climbing Slemish. The book chronicles the history of a family over a whole century of Northern Irish life.

== Annalistic references ==
See Annals of Inisfallen (AI)

- AI777.1 Kl. The battle of Sliab Mis, in which Nia, son of Cú [777] Allaid, fell.

== Gallery ==
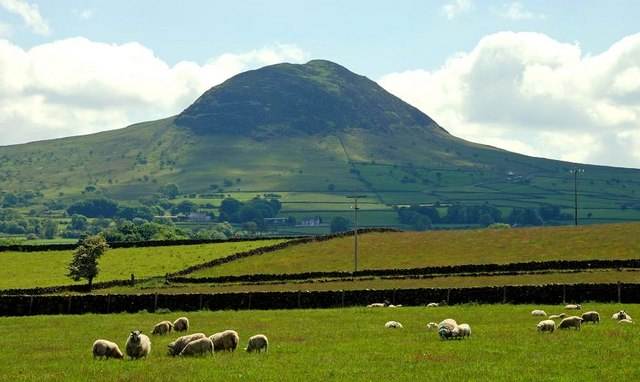
Slemish from Buckna

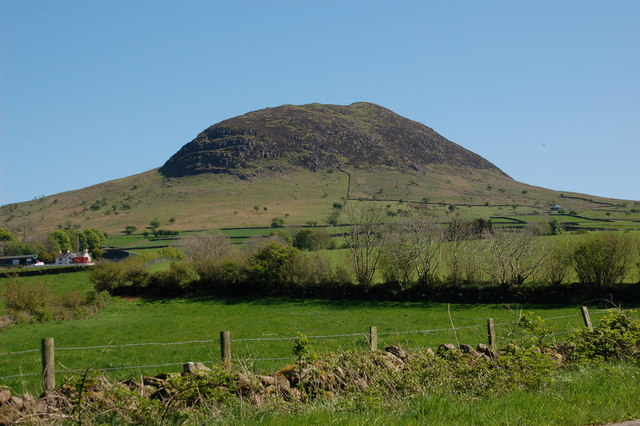
Slemish from Carnstroan Lane

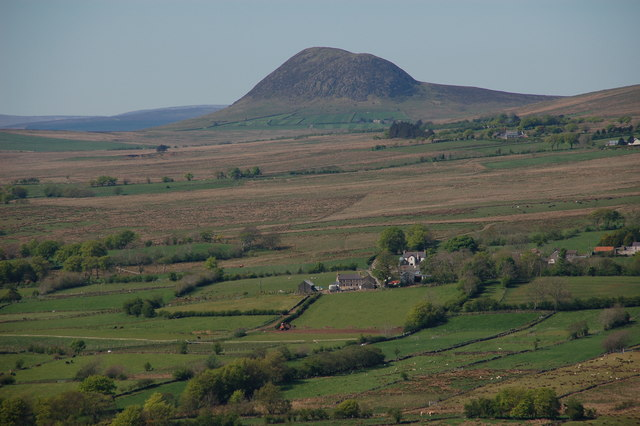
Slemish from Collin Road

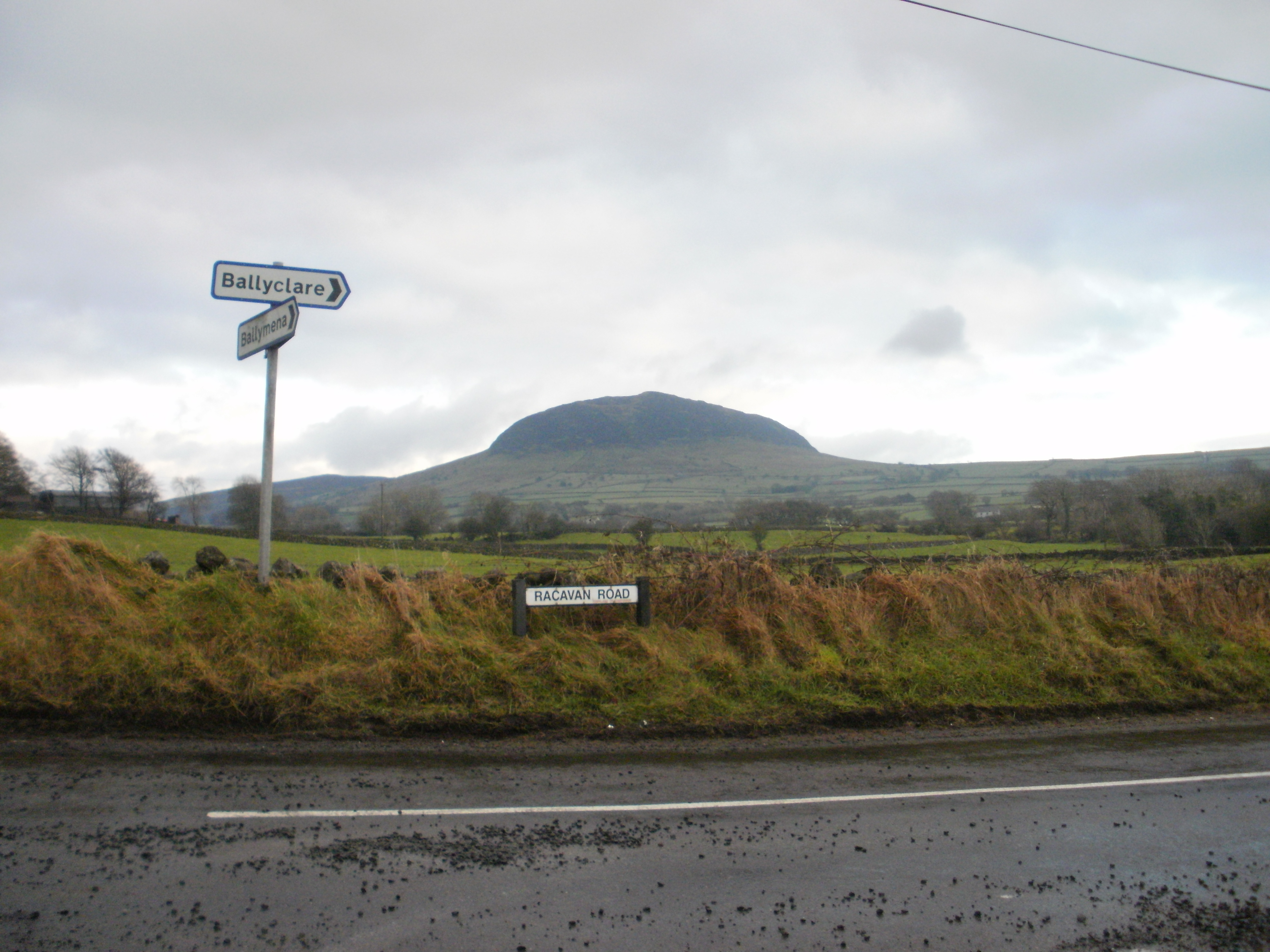
Slemish from Racavan Road

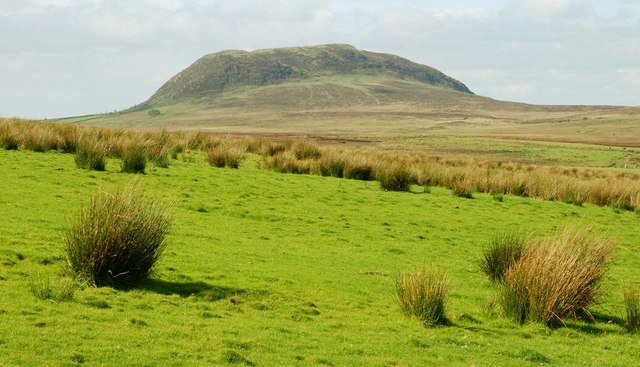
Slemish from Shilnavogy Road
