= Foclut =

Ancient forest in Ireland, described by Saint Patrick

Focluth was the name of an ancient forest in Ireland. Saint Patrick refers to Focluth in the autobiographical portion of his Confession:

...I heard the voices of those Irish who live near the woods of Focluth near the Western Sea. They called out to me with a single voice: "We beg you, holy boy, come here and walk among us!"

Because Patrick was a native of Roman Britain who was taken to Ireland as a slave, most modern scholarship assumes that Focluth was the site of his captivity.

== Focluth's location ==
Focluth's location is not known with certainty. Patrick's 7th-century biographer, Tírechán, writing two centuries after Patrick, indicates that Foclut was in County Mayo near the border with County Sligo, near the modern village of Killala.

There is no direct evidence for this location, but the circumstantial case is fairly strong. Patrick indicates that during his escape from captivity, he had to travel 200 Roman miles (about 185 statute miles) to find a ship to take him to Britain, i.e., a ship on the east coast of Ireland. Additionally, the Killala area's modern climate, among the coldest and wettest in Ireland, meshes well with Patrick's description of performing slave labor "through snow and frost and rain."
