= Jeanne and Richard de Montbaston =

French illustrator

Jeanne de Montbaston (fl. c. 1325–1353) was a French illuminatrix and bookseller who managed a book shop in Paris alongside her husband, Richard de Montbaston. She illustrated and illuminated the books coming out of the Montbaston Aterlier, and her husband sold them.

An illuminatrix at work by Jeanne de Montbaston, perhaps a self-portrait. Roman de la Rose, BnF fr. 25526, fol. 77v.

The Montbaston Aterlier was famous in Paris and produced many notable works for important patrons, such as Philip VI. A colophon in their manuscript of the Legenda Aurea places their atelier on Rue Neuve Notre Dame in Paris. Among the Montbaston's most famous works is one of their copies of Guillaume de Lorris and Jean de Meun's Roman de la Rose, currently housed at the Bibliothèque nationale de France, shelkmarked BnF fr. 25526.

Jeanne's illustrations in the pas de page of the manuscript, showing nuns and friars in various explicit acts, are some of her most recognizable, particularly the so called "Phallus Tree" or "Tree of Phalli".

Questions of Jeanne's literacy have been raised by some scholars, citing the roughness of the illustrations in pas de page of the BnF fr. 25526 Roman de la Rose and their seeming lack of connection to the text. However, other scholars have dispelled these doubts, claiming thematic ties to the text. Rossi suggests rather a deep reading of the text and its thematic implications.

Phallus Tree from the bas de page of Jeanne de Montbaston's Roman de la Rose, BnF MS fr. 25526, fol. 106.

After Richard's death, Jeanne took over the business and continued her work of illuminating and selling books. She was already widowed by the time she took her oath and was registered as an illumniatrix in 1353. Her oath was recorded at the University as follows: Johanna, relicta deffuncti Richardi de Montebaculo, illuminatrix librorum jurata Universitatis ("Joan, widow of the late Richard de Monbaston, illuminator of books, sworn to the University").

While it was not uncommon for the wives and daughters of booksellers to work in the family workshop as copyists, decorators, illuminators, illustrators, and bookbinders, they normally worked informally, remaining unnamed in the records. It was even less common for a woman to give a personal guild oath as Jeanne de Montbaston did. It is unclear whether Richard was himself an artisan and had a hand in book production, or whether his was a purely managerial role. A pair of Jeanne's illustrations in BnF fr. 25526 show two artisans at work, a man writing and a woman illustrating. The woman has been speculated to be a stand-in for Jeanne herself, but the identity of the man has been debated. It is possible that Jeanne's husband was also involved in the production of the books sold by the Montbaston Aterlier, but it has also been speculated that Jeanne had an anonymous collaborator.

Jeanne de Montbaston's illustration of artists at work, from her copy of the Roman de la Rose, BnF MS fr. 25526, fol. 77r.
