= Sancti venite =

- by monks at Bangor Abbey
- English: Come all ye holy
- Genre: Hymn
- Written: 7th century
- Language: Latin
- Meter: 10.10
- Published: AD 680–691

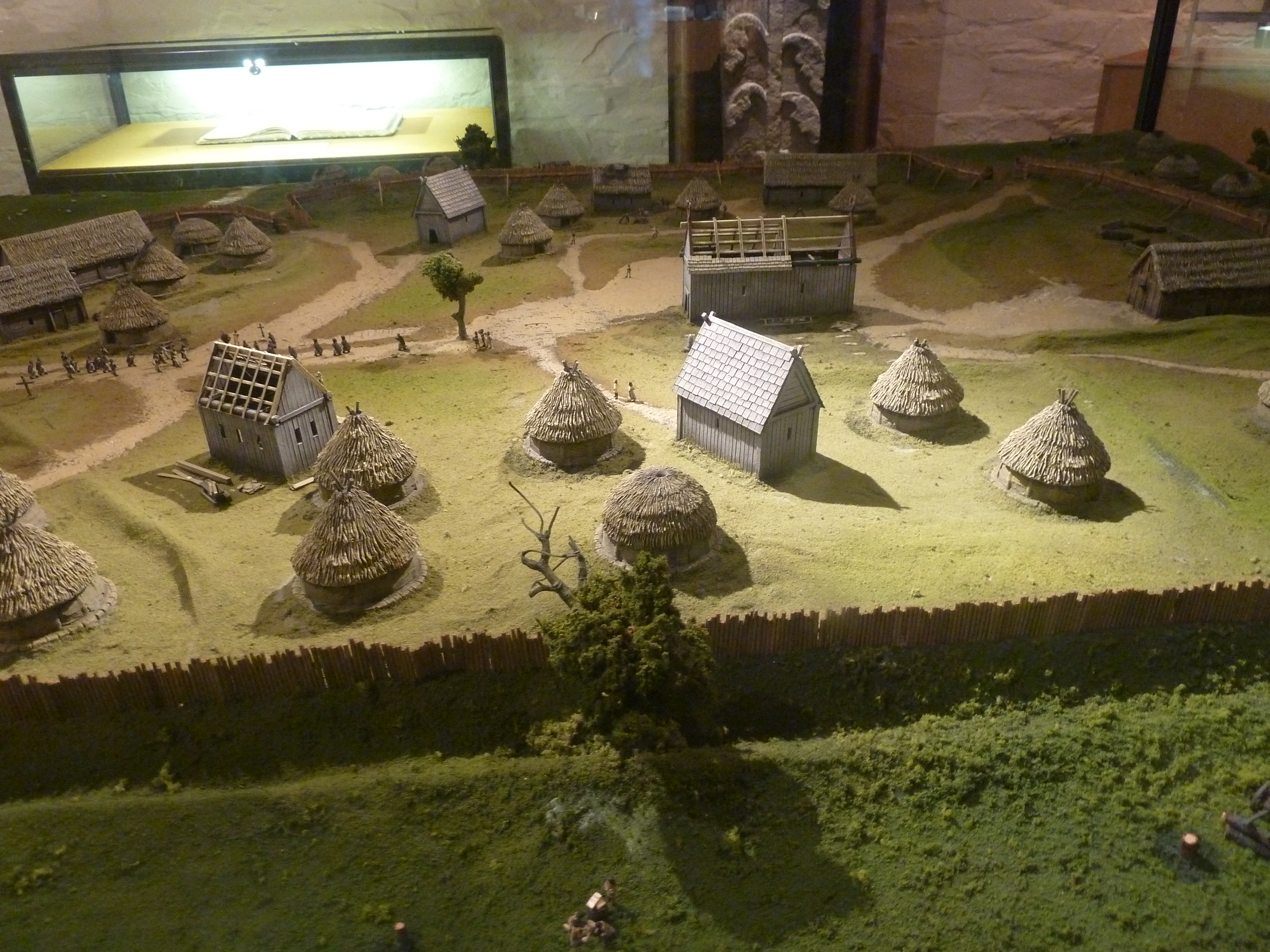
Model of Bangor Abbey around the time of the composition of "Sancti venite"

"Sancti venite" is a Latin Eucharistic hymn recorded in the Antiphonary of Bangor.

== History ==
"Sancti venite" was composed at Bangor Abbey in the 7th century AD, making it the oldest known Eucharistic hymn.

It was carried to Bobbio Abbey and was first published by Ludovico Antonio Muratori in his Anecdota Latina ex Ambrosianæ Bibliothecæ codicibus (1697–98), when he discovered it in the Biblioteca Ambrosiana.

According to a legend recorded in An Leabhar Breac, the hymn was first sung by angels at St. Seachnall's Church, Dunshaughlin, after Secundinus had reconciled with his uncle Saint Patrick.

== Lyrics ==
Latin text

Sancti venite, Christi corpus sumite,
Sanctum bibentes, quo redempti sanguinem.

Salvati Christi corpore et sanguine,
A quo refecti laudes dicamus Deo.

Hoc sacramento corporis et sanguinis
Omnes exuti ab inferni faucibus.

Dator salutis, Christus filius Dei,
Mundum salvavit per crucem et sanguinem.

Pro universis immolatus Dominus
Ipse sacerdos exstitit et hostia.

Lege praeceptum immolari hostias,
Qua adumbrantur divina mysteria.

Lucis indultor et salvator omnium
Praeclaram sanctis largitus est gratiam.

Accedant omnes pura mente creduli,
Sumant aeternam salutis custodiam.

Sanctorum custos, rector quoque,
Dominus, Vitae perennis largitor credentibus.

Caelestem panem dat esurientibus,
De fonte vivo praebet sitientibus.

Alpha et omega ipse Christus Dominus
Venit, venturus iudicare homines.

English text
(tr. John Mason Neale, 1851)

Draw nigh and take the Body of the Lord,
and drink the holy Blood for you outpoured.

Saved by that Body and that precious Blood,
with souls refreshed, we render thanks to God.

Salvation's Giver, Christ, the only Son,
by his dear Cross and Blood the victory won.

Offered was he for greatest and for least,
himself the Victim, and himself the Priest.

Victims were offered by the law of old,
which in a type this heavenly mystery foretold.

He, Ransomer, from death, and Light from shade,
now gives his holy grace his saints to aid;

approach ye then with faithful hearts sincere,
and take the safeguard of salvation here.

He that in this world rules his saints and shields,
to all believers life eternal yields.

With heavenly bread makes them that hunger whole,
gives living waters to the thirsting soul.

Alpha and Omega, to whom shall bow
all nations at the Doom, is with us now.
