= Darerca of Ireland =

Sister of St. Patrick

Saint Darerca of Ireland
- Born: 4th century Britain
- Died: 5th century Ireland
- Venerated in: Roman Catholic Church; Eastern Orthodox Church
- Feast: 22 March
- Patronage: Valentia Island

Saint Darerca of Ireland was a sister of Saint Patrick.

== Life ==
Much obscurity is attached to her history, and it is hard to separate the facts of her history from the network of legends which medieval writers interwove with her acts. Her fame, apart from her relationship to Ireland's national apostle, stands secure as not only a great saint but as the mother of many saints.

When Saint Patrick visited Bredach, as is found in the "Tripartite Life of St. Patrick," he ordained Aengus mac Ailill, the local chieftain of Moville, now a seaside resort for the citizens of Derry. While there he found "the three deacons," his sister's sons, namely, Saint Reat, Saint Nenn, and Saint Aedh, who are commemorated respectively on 3 March, 25 April, and 31 August.

Darerca was at least twice married. Among her husbands, according to histories in Brittany, she was the second wife of Conan Meriadoc and the mother of his eldest son, Gradlon Mawr who became Gradlon the Great, King of Brittany.

Darerca's second husband, Chonas the Briton, founded the church of Both-chonais, now Binnion, Parish of Clonmany, in the barony of Inishowen, County Donegal. She had children by both husbands, all of whom, according to Colgan, became bishops (according to Breton history at least one became King of Brittany, rather than serve the church as a bishop). From the "Tripartite Life of Saint Patrick" it is evident that there were four sons of Darerca by Chonas, namely four bishops, Saint Mel of Ardagh, Ríoch of Inisboffin, Saint Muinis of Forgney, County Longford, and Saint Maelchu. It is well to note that another Saint Muinis, son of Gollit, is described as of Tedel in Ara-cliath.

Darerca had two daughters, Saint Eiche of Kilglass and Saint Lalloc of Senlis. Her first husband was Restitutus the Lombard, after whose death she married Chonas the Briton. By Restitutus she was mother of Saint Sechnall of Dunshaughlin; Saint Nectan of Killunche, and of Fennor (near Slane); of Saint Auxilius of Killossey (near Naas, County Kildare); of Saint Diarmaid of Druim-corcortri (near Navan); of Dabonna, Mogornon, Drioc, Luguat, and Coemed Maccu Baird (the Lombard) of Cloonshaneville, near Frenchpark, County Roscommon.

Four other sons are assigned to her by old Irish writers, namely Saint Crummin of Lecua, Saint Miduu, Saint Carannog, and Saint Maceaith. According to Colgan, the latter is identical with Liamania but must not be confounded with Saint Monennia, or Darerca, whose feast is on 6 July.

Saint Darerca is honoured on 22 March and is the patroness of Valentia Island.

== See also ==
- Darerca
