= St. Patrick: The Irish Legend =

2000 television film

- Written by: Martin Duffy; Robert Hughes
- Directed by: Robert Hughes
- Starring: Patrick Bergin; Malcolm McDowell; Alan Bates; Susannah York
- Music by: Inon Zur
- Country of origin: United Kingdom
- Original language: English

Production
- Producer: Robert Hughes
- Cinematography: James Mathers
- Editor: Terry Chiappe
- Running time: 92 minutes
- Production company: Fox Family Channel

Original release
- Release: 12 March 2000

St. Patrick: The Irish Legend is a 2000 television historical drama about the life of Saint Patrick, the fifth-century missionary bishop and patron saint of Ireland. Directed by Robert Hughes and starring Patrick Bergin in the title role, it was produced by the Fox Family Channel and filmed in Ireland. The film premiered on 12 March 2000. Reviewers praised its cast and Irish locations but criticised its loose treatment of history.

== Plot ==
The film presents Patrick's life in chronological order. Born into a noble family in Roman Britain, he is seized by raiders in his youth and taken to Ireland as a slave, spending six years in captivity before he escapes. He trains for the priesthood and later returns to Ireland as a bishop, founding churches that make room for the customs of the local clans. His work sets him against the Church in Britain, where Bishop Quentin moves to have him excommunicated after Patrick declines to collect the British church's taxes.

== Cast ==
- Patrick Bergin as Saint Patrick
- Malcolm McDowell as Quentin
- Alan Bates as Calpornius, Patrick's father
- Susannah York as Concessa, Patrick's mother
- Luke Griffin as Young Patrick
- Eamonn Owens as Benignus
- Christopher McHallem as Auxilius
- Michael Caven as Iserninus
- Stephen Brennan as Briain

== Production ==
The film was produced by the Fox Family Channel in association with Sharpmist III Ltd. and shot on location in Ireland. Lance H. Robbins was executive producer, with Morgan O'Sullivan and James Flynn as co-producers. James Mathers was the cinematographer and Terry Chiappe edited the film. Inon Zur's score featured the Irish groups the Chieftains and Clannad, and the visual effects were produced by Foundation Imaging.

To prepare for the role, Bergin read as much about the saint as he could. He later described the prayer "Saint Patrick's Breastplate" as a personal ritual, saying that performing its movements amounted to "essentially doing a kind of yoga".

Supporting actor Alan Bates was paid £30,000 for two days' work in March 1999; he thought poorly of the film but used his salary to buy a Renault he coveted.

== Release ==
The film premiered on Fox Family Channel on 12 March 2000.

== Reception ==
Variety praised Bergin ("though it appears that even he is straining to keep a straight face through some of the more fantastical sequences"), and wrote that McDowell, Bates and York "bring some much-needed dignity to the production". It summed up: "An impressive cast and fabulous locales can't elevate this well meaning but completely absurd costumer from years of certain servitude in parochial school auditoriums."

Bates's biographer Donald Spoto says, "Drenched in saccharine piety and utterly lacking in historical accuracy, the television movie presented Patrick mostly as a sideshow miracle worker."

== See also ==
- List of historical drama films
