= St. Seachnall's Church =

- Domnach Sechnaill
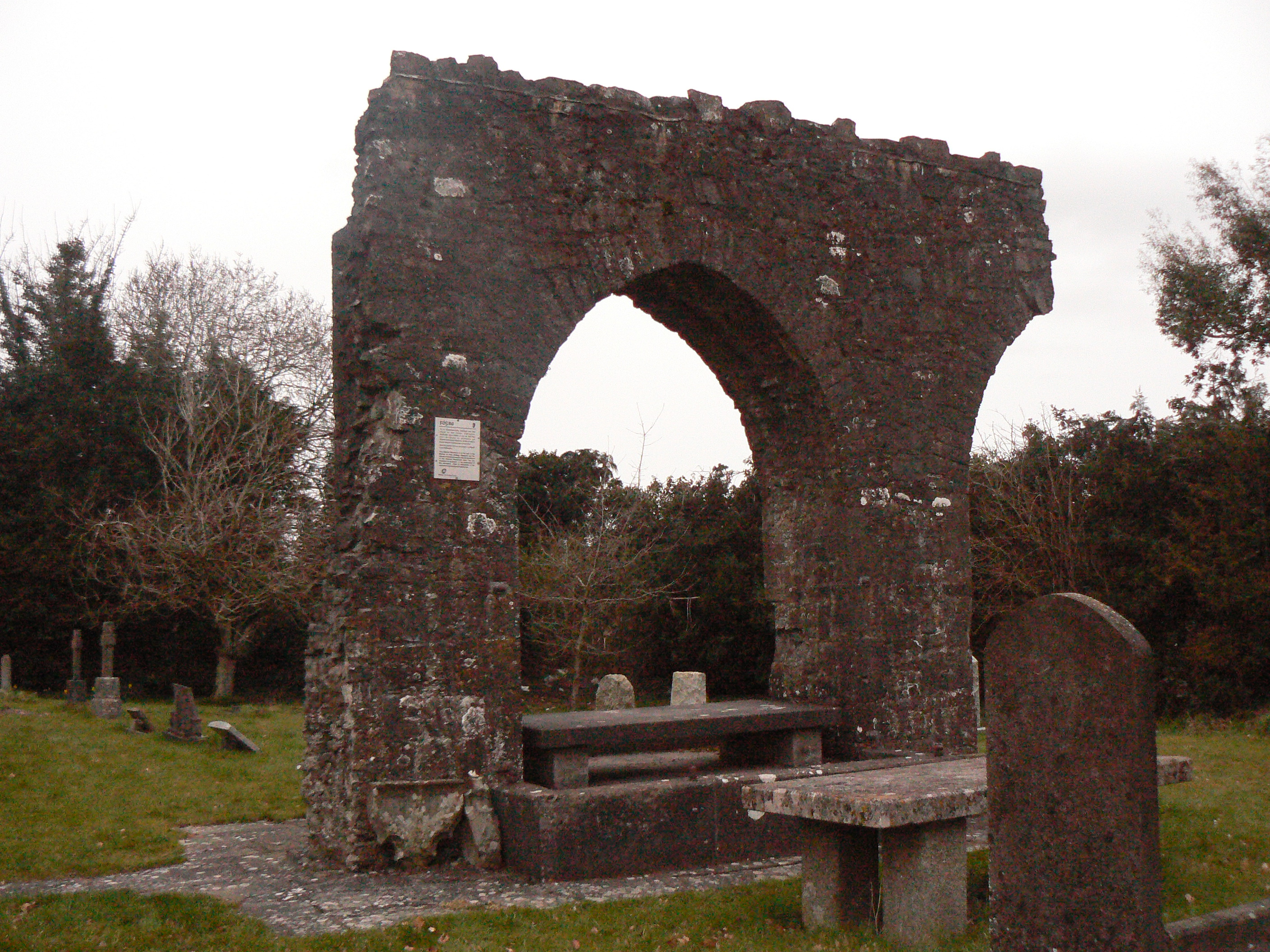

- Location within Ireland
- 53.514242°N 6.539295°W
- Location: Seachnall Place, Dunshaughlin, County Meath
- Country: Ireland
- Denomination: Church of Ireland
- Previous denomination: Pre-Reformation Catholic

History
- Dedication: Secundinus

Architecture
- Style: Celtic Christianity
- Years built: 10th/11th century
- Closed: 18th century

Specifications
- Materials: limestone

Administration
- Diocese: Meath
Designations
National monument of Ireland
- Official name: St. Seachnail's Church
- Reference no.: 400

St. Seachnall's Church is a medieval church and National Monument in County Meath, Ireland.

== Location ==
St. Seachnall's Church is in the centre of Dunshaughlin, slightly east of the R147 (formerly the N3 main road).

== History ==
The R147 road curves around the church, suggesting that an ancient ecclesiastical enclosure has become fossilised in the street layout.

Secundinus (d. 447; variously Sechnall, Seachnall, Seachnail, Secundus) was son of was a son of Restitutus, a Lombard, and Lubaid, traditionally said to be a sister of Saint Patrick and founder of a church on the site between AD 439 and 447. The name Dunshaughlin is ultimately from Domhnach Seachnall – the church of Seachnall. The name Máel Sechnaill – servant of Seachnall – was common among Kings of Tara.

According to a legend recorded in An Leabhar Breac, the 7th-century Eucharistic hymn Sancti venite was first sung by angels at Dunshaughlin, after Secundinus had reconciled with his uncle Saint Patrick.

The abbots of Dunshaughlin are recorded in the 9th century, beginning with Ruamnus (d. 801), and continuing to Scannal mac Fergil (murdered 886). Erenachs and coarbs (lay guardians of a parish church and headman of the family in hereditary occupation of church lands) of Dunshaughlin are recorded in AD 952, 1027 and 1040. The monastery at Dunshaughlin was burned down in raids in AD 1026, 1142 and 1143. It was also plundered by the Uí Briúin in 1152.

Dunshaughlin was also probably the church site of the Síl nÁedo Sláine kings of the 6th–8th century.

After the Norman invasion of Ireland Dunshaughlin became a seigniorial manor of Hugh de Lacy, Lord of Meath. The earthwork c. 700 m to the south of the church could be a motte built by him. Thereafter, the church became parochial.

A church at "Denclynschael" is listed in the ecclesiastical taxation (1302–06) of Pope Nicholas IV. James Ussher, Church of Ireland Archbishop of Armagh described the church and chancel of "Donshahlen" as ruined in 1622. Isaac Butler, writing in 1749, describes the church and tower as in good repair, but the chancel was ruined.

The present Church of Ireland church was built in 1813 north of the older structure.

== Church ==
The remains of the parish church, consisting of one pointed arch and two piers of an arcade, suggest that its nave had aisles.

An octagonal limestone font has been moved to the modern church;it contained carvings in relief.

Also present is a crucifixion scene carved in false relief over the lintel of a doorway.
