= Killashee =

Killashee may refer to:

- Killashee, County Longford, Irish village
- Killashee Round Tower, monastic site in County Kildare, Ireland
