= Killashee Round Tower =

Irish recorded monument

Killashee
- Cill Uasaille
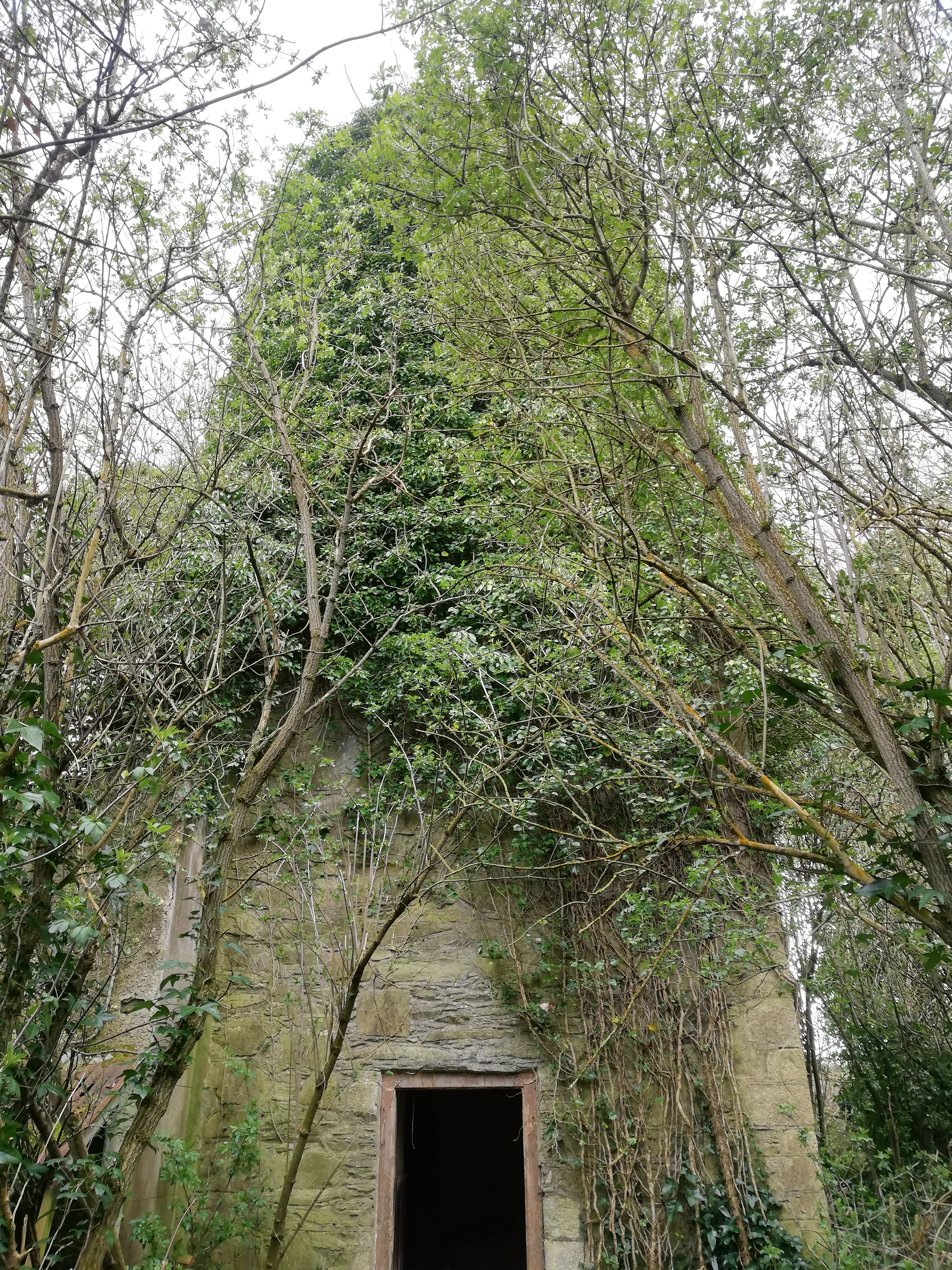
- The round tower with modern doorway at base

- Location within Ireland
- Interactive map of Killashee

Monastery information
- Other names: Killussy, Kyllusty, Killossy, Cell-Usall, Ceall-Usall, Cill-Ausaille
- Order: Celtic; Knights Hospitaller
- Denomination: Church of Ireland (church, 1540–1965); Catholic (monastery, 450–1540)
- Established: c. AD 450s
- Disestablished: c. 1540
- Dedication: Auxilius
- Diocese: Kildare and Leighlin

People
- Founder: Auxilius

Architecture
- Status: Ruined
- Functional status: Inactive
- Style: Celtic

Site
- Location: Killashee, Naas, County Kildare
- Country: Ireland
- Coordinates: 53°11′20″N 6°40′20″W
- Visible remains: round tower, church, walls, graveyard
- Public access: No

Killashee Round Tower is an Irish round tower that forms part of the monastic remnants of Killashee, County Kildare, Ireland. On the Record of Monuments and Places its number is KD024-003.

== History ==
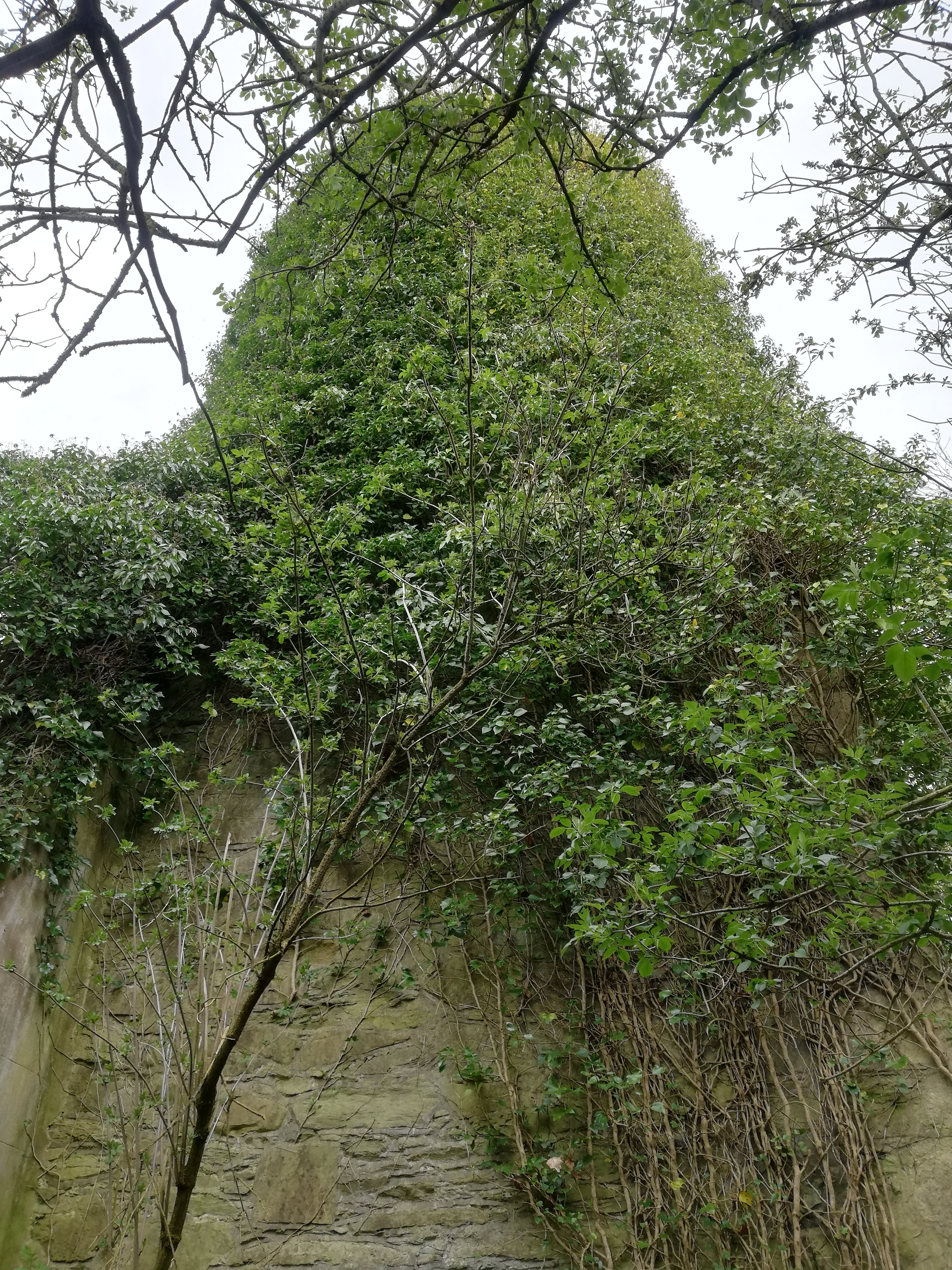
Killashee tower

Killashee traces its foundation to the 5th century and is associated with Auxilius, a nephew and companion of Saint Patrick, with the Annals of the Four Masters dating its founding to AD 454. Souterrains were also dug during the medieval period. Located on the ancient territory of the Uí Bairrche tribe, Killashee was raided by Vikings in AD 824. In 1035 it was again plundered by Vikings, who also attacked Clane Abbey.

The round tower is dated to the 12th or 13th century; it is similar to those at Ferns or Dungiven.

In the Late Middle Ages it came under the control of the Knights Hospitaller. After the Dissolution of the Monasteries (1539–40) control fell to Thomas Luttrell.

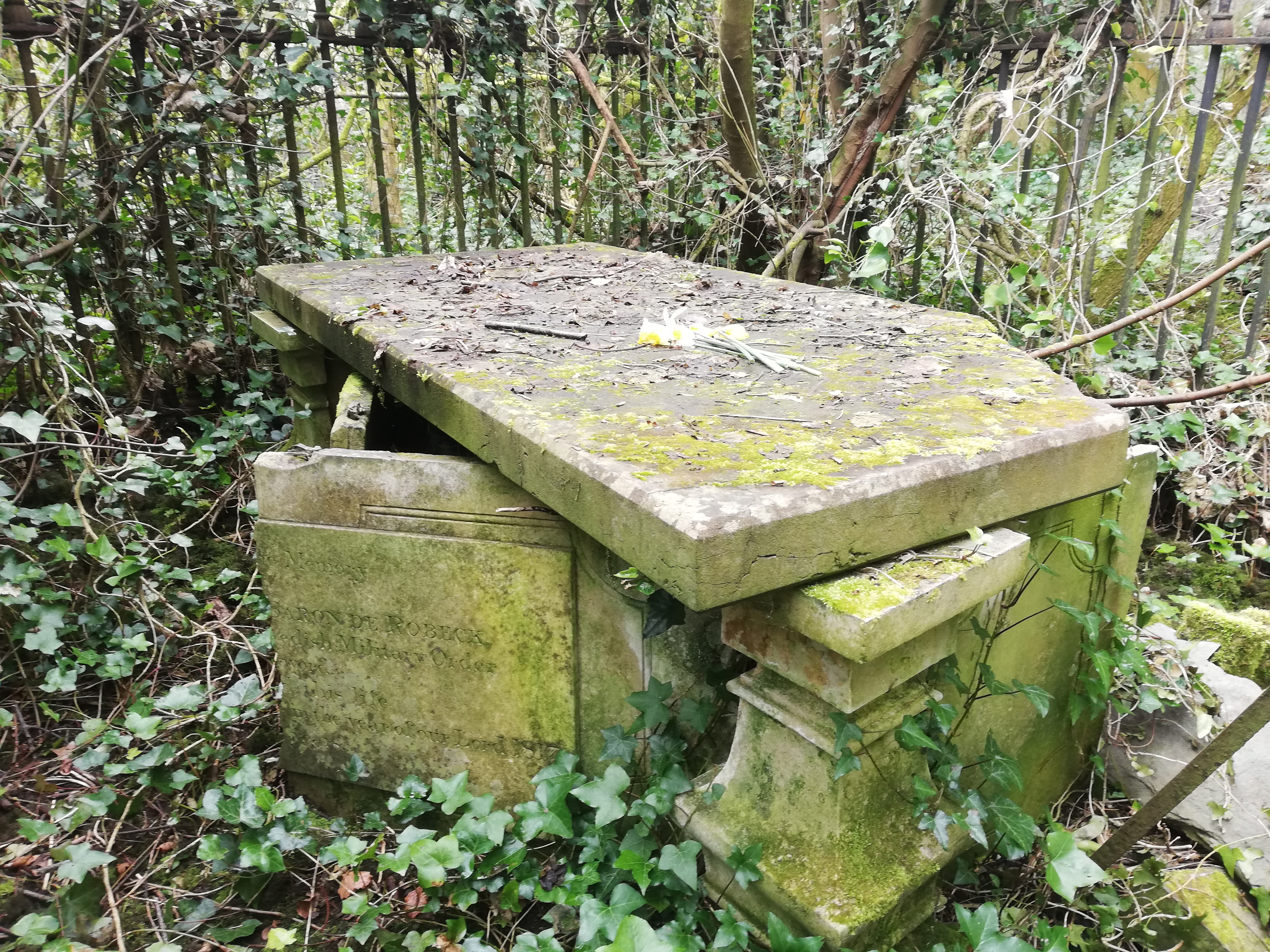
Tomb in Killashee graveyard

The current church dates to the 18th century and was built atop the earlier medieval church. The A-roof line of the old church is visible on the east wall of the round tower.

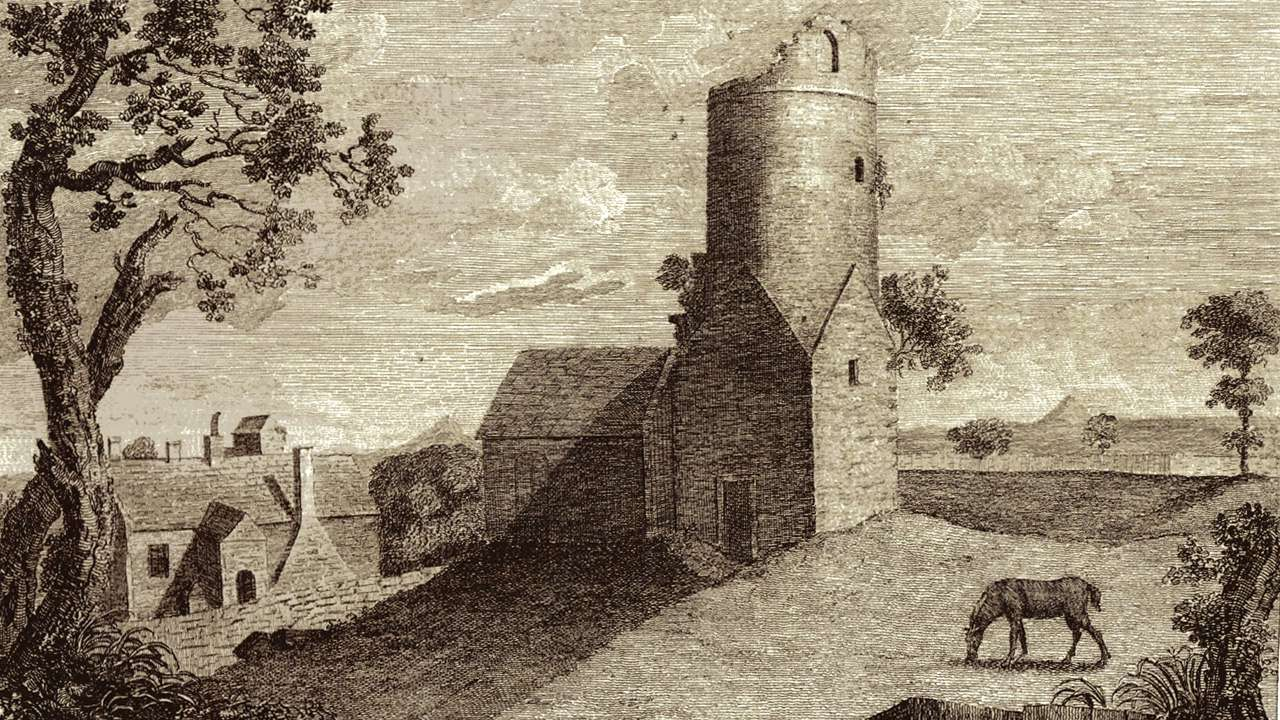
1792 engraving

By the 18th century the land was in the hands of the Graydon family, who built a mill, nicknamed "Graydon's Folly", to the north. In 1792 it was visited by Daniel Charles Grose who commissioned an engraving by J. Newton. In the mid-19th century the Moore family owned Killashee and built a large Victorian mansion; this was in 1927 sold to the Holy Union Sisters for a convent and is today a hotel.

The church was in use by the Church of Ireland until it was closed in 1965; some of the memorial plaques in the church were moved to St David's Church, Naas. It is today heavily overgrown and is closed to the public.

=== Annalistic references ===
- AD 454 (AFM): Saint Usaille, Bishop of Cill Usaille, in Liffe, died on the twenty seventh of August.
- 827 (AFM): Maeldobharchon, Abbot of Cill Uasaille; [died]
- 829 (Annals of Ulster): Mael Dobarchon, abbot of Cell Usaile [died]
- 870 (AFM): Loingseach, son of Faeillen, Abbot of Cill Ausaille [died].
- 874 (AU): Áed son of Niall led an army to Laigin and they profaned Cell Ausili, and other churches were burned with their oratories.
- 1035 (AFM): Cill-Usaille and Claenadh were plundered by the foreigners; but the son of Donnchadh, son of Domhnall, overtook them, and made a bloody slaughter of them.

== Buildings ==
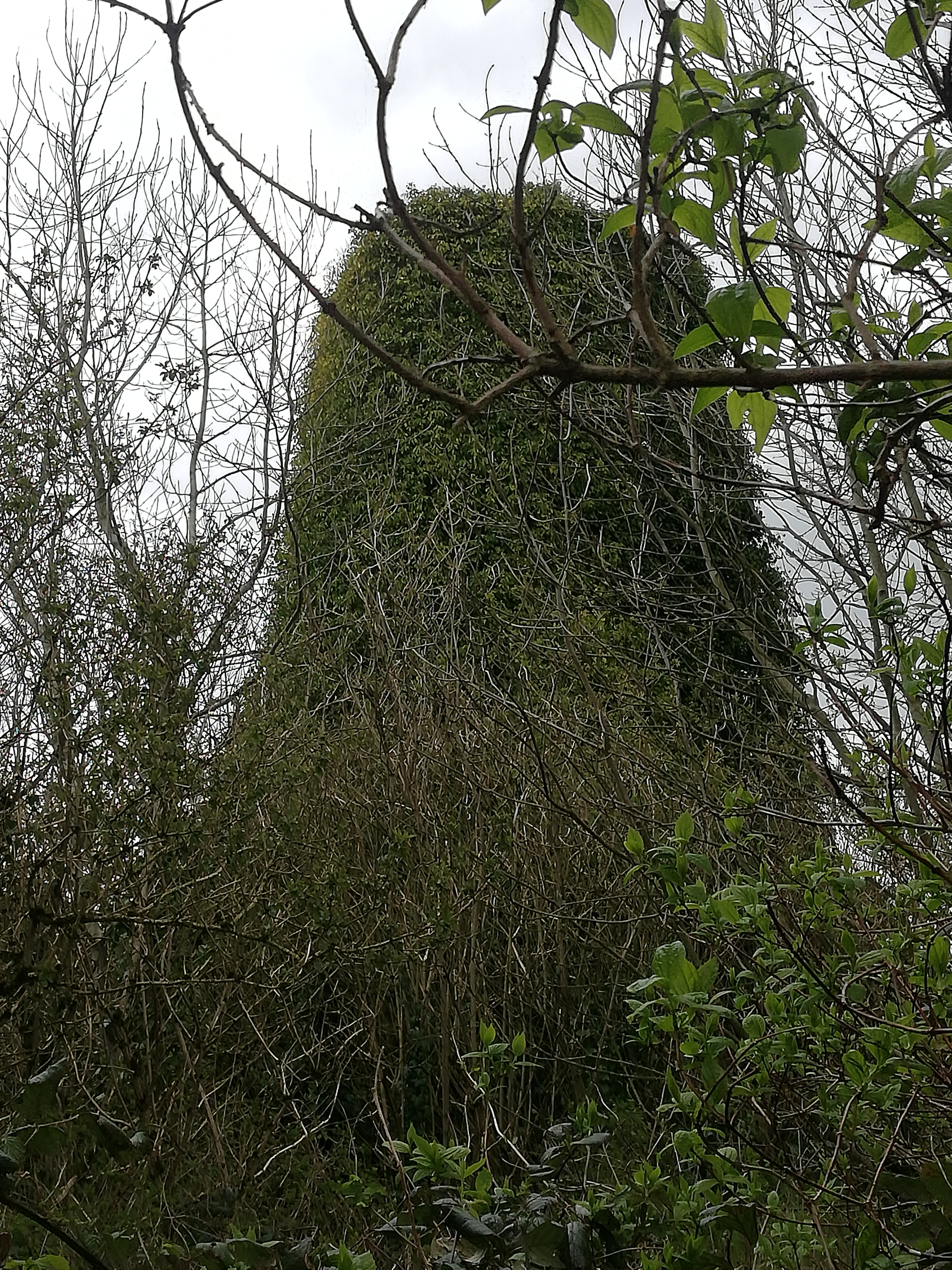
View of the round tower, covered by vegetation

In 1837, it was reported that none of the old church was left, but there was a round tower with a square base attached to the west end of the modern stone church. The Ordnance Survey reported that "a few years ago an old castle stood near the Round Tower" but that it had been thrown down and that "the stones of it are yet to be seen."

The round tower is small, covering three storeys, and is built of uncoursed granite blocks. It is incorporated into the fabric of the church in an unusual manner, with St Kevin's Kitchen in Glendalough being the most similar.

There is a graveyard surrounding the tower and church, and a holy well dedicated to Saint Patrick located nearby.
