= Palladius (bishop of Ireland) =

5th century deacon and first bishop of Ireland

Saint Palladius

Bishop of Ireland Apostle of the Scots
- Venerated in: Catholic Church; Eastern Orthodox Church; Anglican Communion
- Patronage: Leinster, Kincardineshire

Palladius (fl. early 5th Century) was the first bishop of the Christians of Ireland, preceding Saint Patrick. It is possible that some elements of their life stories were later conflated in Irish tradition. Palladius was a deacon and member of one of the prominent families in Gaul. Pope Celestine I consecrated him a bishop and sent him to Ireland "to the Scotti believing in Christ".

== Background ==
The Palladii were reckoned among the noblest families of France and several of them held high rank about this time in the Church of Gaul. The Gallo-Roman poet Rutilius Claudius Namatianus, in his poem De reditu suo, recounting his voyage from Rome to Gaul in 417, mentions a young relative of his called Palladius, who had been sent from Gaul to Rome to study law. He refers to Palladius's father, Exuperantius, as bringing peace, law and freedom to Armorica. Exuperantius was apparently praefectus praetorio Galliarum ("Praetorian prefect of the Gallic provinces") when he was killed in an army mutiny at Arles in 424.

Prosper of Aquitaine in his Chronicon mentions a deacon called Palladius, who in 429 urged Pope Celestine I to send bishop Germanus of Auxerre to Britain to bring the Britons back to the Catholic faith. Butler and P.F. Moran say that Palladius was a Deacon of Rome, as it is unlikely that a deacon of Auxerre would exercise the influence in Rome that many have assigned to Palladius; and that it is in accordance with St Prosper's usage to indicate the Roman deacon by the simple title "diaconus." Historian Kathleen Hughes regards it as more probable that he was a deacon of Germanus, and that Germanus sent him to Rome, to request a commission to travel to Britain at the request of the British bishops to help combat Pelagianism.

== Ireland ==
In 431, Prosper's Chronicon records: "Palladius, having been ordained by Pope Celestine, is sent as first bishop to the Scotti believing in Christ." This implies there was already a community of Christians in Ireland, who may have requested a bishop be appointed. Prosper later wrote in his Contra collatorem (c. 433) that Celestine, "having ordained a bishop for the Irish, while he labours to keep the Roman island Catholic, he has also made the barbarian island Christian."

Palladius landed at Arklow. Auxilius, Secundinus, and Iserninus are missioners identified with St. Patrick, but more recent research associates them not with Patrick but with Palladius.

Irish writers who chronicled the life of St Patrick state that St Palladius preached in Ireland before St Patrick, although he was soon banished by the king of Leinster, and returned to North Britain. According to Muirchu (who lived two centuries later) in the Book of Armagh, "God hindered him...and neither did those fierce and cruel men receive his doctrine readily, nor did he himself wish to spend time in a strange land, but returned to him who sent him." Palladius was accompanied by four companions: Sylvester and Solinus, who remained after him in Ireland, and Augustinus and Benedictus, who followed him to Britain but returned to their own country after his death. Palladius is most strongly associated with Leinster, particularly with Clonard, County Meath.

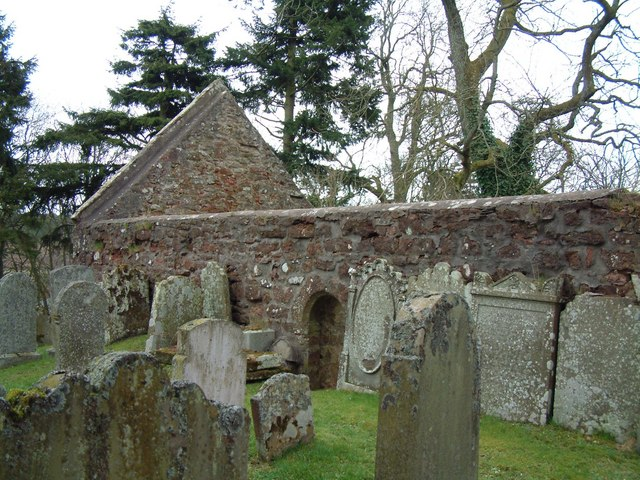
St Palladius Church, Fordoun

== Scotland ==
According to Muirchu, Palladius arrived among the Scots in North Britain after he left Ireland. Scottish church tradition holds that he presided over a Christian community there for about 20 years. A cluster of dedications in the Mearns in Scotland, in the village of Auchenblae, are believed to mark his last resting place. As late as the reign of James V, royal funds were disbursed for the fabrication of a new reliquary for the church there, and an annual "Paldy Fair" was held at least until the time of the Reformation.

== Death ==
His date of death is unknown; however, the Annals of Ulster contain the following references:

- 457 "Repose of the elder Patrick, as some books state"
- 461 "Here some record the repose of Patrick"
- 492 "The Irish state here that Patrick the Archbishop died."
- 493 "Patrick... apostle of the Irish, rested on the 16th day before the Kalends of April..."

Thus, it is possible that later writers confused Palladius and Patrick. If the earlier dates of 457/461 indeed refer to him, then it seems that the actual St Patrick died much later about 492/493. Patrick's mission was largely confined to Ulster and Connacht, while Palladius seems to have been active in Leinster, particularly in the area around Clonard.

The Vita tripartita states that he died at Cell Fine (thought to be modern-day Killeen Cormac, County Kildare), where he left his books, writing tablet and relics of Peter and Paul. Alban Butler, citing Hector Boethius and Camden, says that he died at Fordun, fifteen miles south of Aberdeen, around the year 450.

== See also ==
- Secundinus

== Bibliography ==
- "New light on Palladius?", Peritia iv (1986), pp. 276–83.
- Ó Cróinín (2000). "Who was Palladius 'First Bishop of the Irish'?". Peritia. 14: 205–37. doi:10.1484/j.peri.3.400.
- Vita tripartita Sancti Patricii (MS).
