= Secundinus =

Saint Secundinus
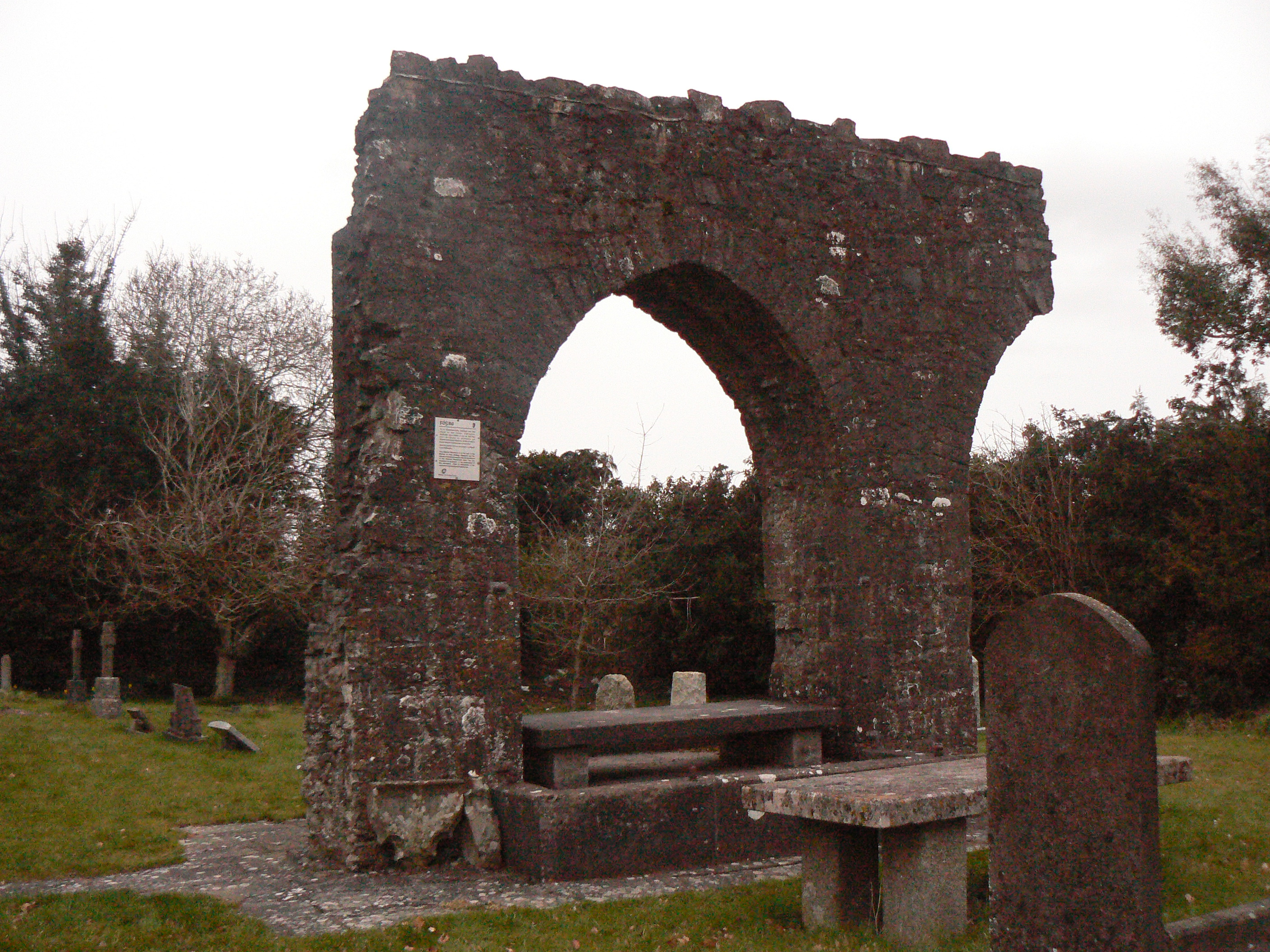
- Monastic ruins in Dunshaughlin today
- Church: Domhnach Sechnaill/Dunshaughlin, County Meath.

Personal details
- Born: 372 Italy?
- Died: 447/8? Ireland

Sainthood
- Feast day: 27 November
- Venerated in: Roman Catholic Church

Secundinus (fl. 5th century), or Sechnall (Modern Irish: Seachnall) as he was known in Irish, was founder and patron saint of Domhnach Sechnaill, County Meath, who went down in medieval tradition as a disciple of St Patrick and one of the first bishops of Armagh. Historians have suggested, however, that the connection with St Patrick was a later tradition invented by Armagh historians in favour of their patron saint and that Secundinus is more likely to have been a separate missionary, possibly a companion of Palladius.

== Background and sources ==
Little is known about the saint and his cult. His foundation is Domnach Sechnaill ('Church of Sechnall'), now Dunshaughlin (County Meath), not far from Tara, and to judge by the use of the toponymic element domnach (from Latin dominicum), the church is likely to be early. T.M. Charles-Edwards suggests that the site may have belonged originally to the province of Leinster rather than Mide, but that the political geography had changed by the 8th century, when much of southern Brega was divided between different septs of the Síl nÁedo Sláine. By that time, Domnach Sechnaill lay in the kingdom of the Uí Chernaig, close to the royal crannóg seat in Loch nGabor, as did the churches of Trevet and Kilbrew.

Linguistic arguments in favour of the early date of the saint's arrival and his foundation have also been advanced with respect to the saint's name in Latin and Irish. The Late Latin name Secundinus was a common one across Latin-speaking parts of Europe. His name was borrowed into the vernacular as Sechnall, according to a pattern for which David N. Dumville proposes the following stages of development: Secundinus > *Sechundinus > *Sechundīnəs > *Sechundīn > *Sechndən > *Sechnən and finally by the 8/9th century, > *Sechnəl. If correct, this pattern lends further credence to a 5th-century floruit of the saint.

Traditions about the saint are witnessed by variety of sources, including Irish annals, the Félire Óengusso and other martyrologies, the Tripartite Life of St Patrick and a list of the coarbs of St Patrick. Secundinus is also the ascribed author of an early Latin hymn in praise of St Patrick, known as Audite Omnes Amantes ('Hear ye, All lovers') or the Hymn of Secundinus written in trochaic septenarius, the earliest copy of which is found in the late 7th-century Antiphonary of Bangor. The ascription to Secundinus, whether true or false, is commonplace in medieval sources, occurring as early as in the Félire Óengusso, and notably appears in the Irish preface preserved in some manuscript copies of the Hymn. This preface adds some biographical detail, including a legend about Sechnall's quarrel and reconciliation with Patrick leading up to the composition of the hymn. A hagiographical Life was written for the saint, but it comes down to us only in a 17th-century manuscript compilation donated by Irish Jesuit Henry FitzSimon to the Bollandists. The manuscript is found in the Bollandist collection of the Royal Library of Brussels under the shelfmark MS 8957–8.

== Life ==
Srúaim n-ecnai co n-áni,
Sechnall mind ar flathae,
ro gab ceol, sóer solad,
molad Pátric Machae. A stream of wisdom with splendour,
Sechnall diadem of our lords,
has chanted a melody — noble profit! —
a praise of Patrick of Armagh

— — Félire Óengusso (27 November)

The Irish annals report that in 439, bishops Secundinus, Auxilius and Iserninus arrived in Ireland to the aid of St Patrick. Muirchú also tells of the involvement of Auxilius and Iserninus, both possibly from Auxerre, but does not name Secundinus.

Later tradition, which is of uncertain provenance, appears to suggest that Secundinus and Auxilius were of Italian origin. Details to this effect are first given in the Irish preface to the Hymn of Secundinus as found in some manuscript versions of the Liber Hymnorum. It states that Secundinus was a son of Restitutus and St Patrick's sister Dar Ercae; in the Chronicon Scotorum the latter is named Culmana. The preface cites a stanza by Armagh scholar Eochaid ua Flannacain (d. 1005) to assert that Restitutus belonged to the Lombards of Letha, a place-name which referred to Gaul but was sometimes confused with Latium. In the stanza, Sechnall receives the paternal family name moccu Baird. Although the presence of Lombards in Italy would be an anachronism, Thomas F. O'Rahilly considers it possible that Secundinus – and perhaps Auxilius, too – came from northern Italy. Like the saint's own name, Restitutus was a popular Late Latin name in Christian Europe, but in this case there is no way of telling whether Patrician historians were using genuine information or filling in gaps in the saint's genealogical dossier.

Some scholars have suggested that Secundinus preceded Saint Patrick in Ireland. In his lecture The Two Patricks, O'Rahilly argues that Secundinus, possibly a native of northern Italy (see above), was one of three bishops who arrived in Ireland in 439 to assist Palladius, whose mission had begun in 431 and who was known in Ireland as Patricius (leading to confusion with the later Saint Patrick). In 441 Palladius was recalled to Rome to be examined by the newly elected Pope Leo I, leaving Secundinus in charge of the Church in Ireland. He became known as the first Christian bishop to die on Irish soil.

Dumville allows for the possibility that Secundinus participated in the Palladian mission, but is more hesitant.

The development of Patrician legend also saw Secundinus becoming gradually more involved in the process whereby the see of Armagh received the relics of Saints Peter and Paul. St Patrick, according to his Tripartite Life, entrusted his see to Secundinus when he went to Rome to obtain the relics, while the preface to the Hymn tells that Patrick had sent him off to obtain them in person.

Secundinus is said to have died in 447 or 448, aged 75.

== Commemoration ==
The saint's name was familiar enough in Mide to give rise to a number of derivative personal names, notably Máel Sechnaill (attested since the 9th century) and later also Gilla Sechnaill.

Despite the evidence for a medieval Life, there is little in the sources to suggest that Sechnall was the subject of a flourishing cult during much of the Middle Ages. His feast-day is 27 November.
