= Darerca =

Darerca may refer to any one of four Irish saints:

- Darerca of Ireland, 5th century sister of Saint Patrick. Feastday: 22 March
- Darerca of Killeevy (also known as Saint Monenna), late 5th/early 6th century Abbess of Killeevy, Co Armagh. Feastday: 6 July
- Darerca of Druim, mother of Bishop Tigernach of Clonmacnoise. Feastday: 4 April
- Darerca ingen Cairbre, Feastday: 15 January
