= Antiphonary of Bangor =

Ancient Irish manuscript in Latin

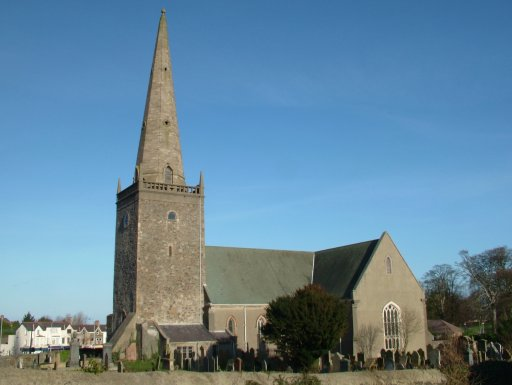
Bangor Abbey, where the Antiphonary of Bangor may have been written

The Antiphonary of Bangor (Antiphonarium Monasterii Benchorensis) is an ancient Latin manuscript, supposed to have been originally written at Bangor Abbey in modern-day Northern Ireland.

== History ==
A thin manuscript volume of 36 leaves, it is the oldest extant liturgical monument of the Celtic Church to which an approximate date can with certainty be assigned, and which on this and other grounds is of particular interest to liturgical scholars, particularly in Ireland and Great Britain.

The codex, found by Muratori in the Ambrosian Library at Milan, and named by him the "Antiphonary of Bangor" ("Antiphonarium Benchorense"), was brought to Milan from Bobbio Abbey with many other books by Dr Federigo Cardinal Borromeo, Archbishop of Milan, when he founded the Ambrosian Library in 1609.

Bobbio, situated in a gorge of the Apennines thirty-seven miles north-east of Genoa, was founded by Saint Columbanus, a disciple of Saint Comgall, founder of the great monastery at Bangor, in County Down, Northern Ireland. Columbanus died at Bobbio and was buried there in 615. This establishes at once a connection between Bobbio and Bangor, and an examination of the contents of the codex placed it beyond all doubt that it was originally compiled in Bangor and brought thence to Bobbio, although not in the time of Saint Columbanus: there is in the codex a hymn entitled "ymnum sancti Congilli abbatis nostri", and he is referred to in it as "nostri patroni Comgilli sancti". Again there is a list of fifteen abbots, beginning with Comgall and ending with Cronan, the fifteenth abbot, who died in 691; the date of the compilation, therefore, may be referred to 680–691.

It is natural that a certain measure of occasional contact may have been kept up between Bobbio and Bangor. At what time or by whom the Antiphonary was carried from Bangor to St. Columban's Abbey of Bobbio, cannot with ceritainty be determined. It would not be surprising if, on the destruction of the establishment at Bangor by the Danes in the ninth century, some monk from Bangor should have sought shelter in the house founded by the disciple of St. Comgall, and should have carried thither a portion of the literary treasures of his own monastic home.

The actual bearer of the codex from Bangor is generally supposed and stated to have been Saint Dungal, who left Ireland early in the 9th century, acquired great celebrity on the Continent, and probably retired to Bobbio towards the close of his life. He bequeathed his books to "the blessed Columbanus", i.e., to his monastery at Bobbio. The antiphonary, however, cannot be identified with any of the books named in the catalogue of the books bequeathed by Dungal, as given by Muratori, and there are no sufficient grounds for connecting Dungal with Bangor at all.

Muratori is careful to state in his preface that the codex, though very old, and in part mutilated, may have been a copy made at Bobbio, by some of the local monks there, from the original service book. The Antiphonary is written in Latin, but contains strong internal evidence of its Irish origin. It is written, as regards the orthography, the form of the letters, and the dotted ornamentation of the capital letters, in "the Scottic style", but this, of course, may have been done by Gaelic monks at Bobbio.

Here only a summary can be given of the contents of the codex, to which the name of "Antiphonary" will be found to be not very applicable: (1) six canticles; (2) twelve metrical hymns; (3) sixty-nine collects for use at the canonical hours; (4) special collects; (5) seventy anthems, or versicles; (6) the Creed; (7) the Pater Noster. The most famous item in the contents is the venerable Eucharistic hymn "Sancti venite Christi corpus sumite", which is not found in any other ancient text. It was sung at the Communion of the clergy and is headed, "Ymnum quando comonicarent sacerdotes". A text of the hymn from the old manuscripts of Bobbio, with a literal translation, is given in "Essays on the Discipline and Constitution of the Early Irish Church," (p. 166) by Cardinal Moran, who refers to it as that "golden fragment of our ancient Irish Liturgy".

There are six canticles given:

1. Audite, coeli
2. Cantemus Domino
3. Benedicite
4. Te Deum
5. Benedictus
6. Gloria in excelsis

The Bangor Antiphonary gives sets of collects to be used at each hour. One set is in verse (cf. the Mass in hexameters in the Reichenau Gallican fragment). It also gives several sets of collects, not always complete, but always in the same order. It may be conjectured that these sets show some sort of skeleton of the Bangor Lauds. The order always is:

1. Post canticum" (evidently from the subjects, which, like those of the first ode of a Greek canon, refer to the Crossing of the Red Sea, Cantemus Domino)
2. Post Benedictionem trium Puerorum
3. Post tres Psalmos, or Post Laudate Dominum de coelis (Ps. cxlvii–cl)
4. Post Evangelium (clearly meaning benedictus, the only gospel canticle in the book and the only one not otherwise provided for. The same term is often applied—e.g. in the York Breviary—to Benedictus, Magnificat, and Nunc Dimittis)
5. Super hymnum
6. De Martyribus-The last may perhaps be compared with the commemorations that come at the end of Lauds in, for instance, the pre-Vatican II Roman Divine Office. There are also sets of antiphons, super Cantemus Domino et Benedicite, super Laudate Dominum de coelis, and De Martyribus. In the Bangor book there are collects to go with the Te Deum, given apart from the preceding, as though they formed part of another Hour; but in the Turin fragment they, with the text of the Te Deum, follow the Benedicite and its collects, and precede the Laudate Dominum de coelis.

The Antiphonary gives twelve hymns of which eight are not found elsewhere, and ten are certainly intended for liturgical use. Comgall and Camelac are credited as authors.

In his Vita S. Columbani, Jonas of Bobbio mentioned that as a young man, Columbanus composed a number of pieces suitable for singing and useful for instruction. Michael Lapidge suggests that some of these may have found their way into Bangor books, including the Antiphonary, which seems to have been written around 700, about 100 years after the death of Columbanus. He indicates that there are compelling reasons to believe that the hymn Precamur patrem was written by Columbanus, although this interpretation is not universally accepted.
