= Máel Sechnaill =

Máel Sechnaill, an early Irish personal name meaning "Devotee of St Sechnall" who is thought to be a 5th century Italian Bishop that preceded St Patrick. It may refer to:

- Máel Sechnaill mac Máele Ruanaid (d. 862), high-king of Ireland
- Máel Sechnaill mac Domnaill (d. 1022), king of Mide and high-king of Ireland
- A name shared by other kings of Mide
