= Iserninus =

Saint Iserninus
- Died: ~456; Aghade, Ireland
- Venerated in: Roman Catholic Church

Saint Iserninus (or Isernius) (c. 456 AD) was an early Christian missionary of Ireland who is associated with Saint Patrick and Saint Auxilius in establishing Christianity in the south of that island. More recent research associates him not with Patrick but with Palladius.

== Traditional view ==
Saint Iserninus is thought to have been a Briton or Irishman, and is associated with the lands of the Uí Cheinnselaig in Leinster. He was originally named Fith, and he may have been ordained a deacon at Auxerre with Patrick and Auxilius.

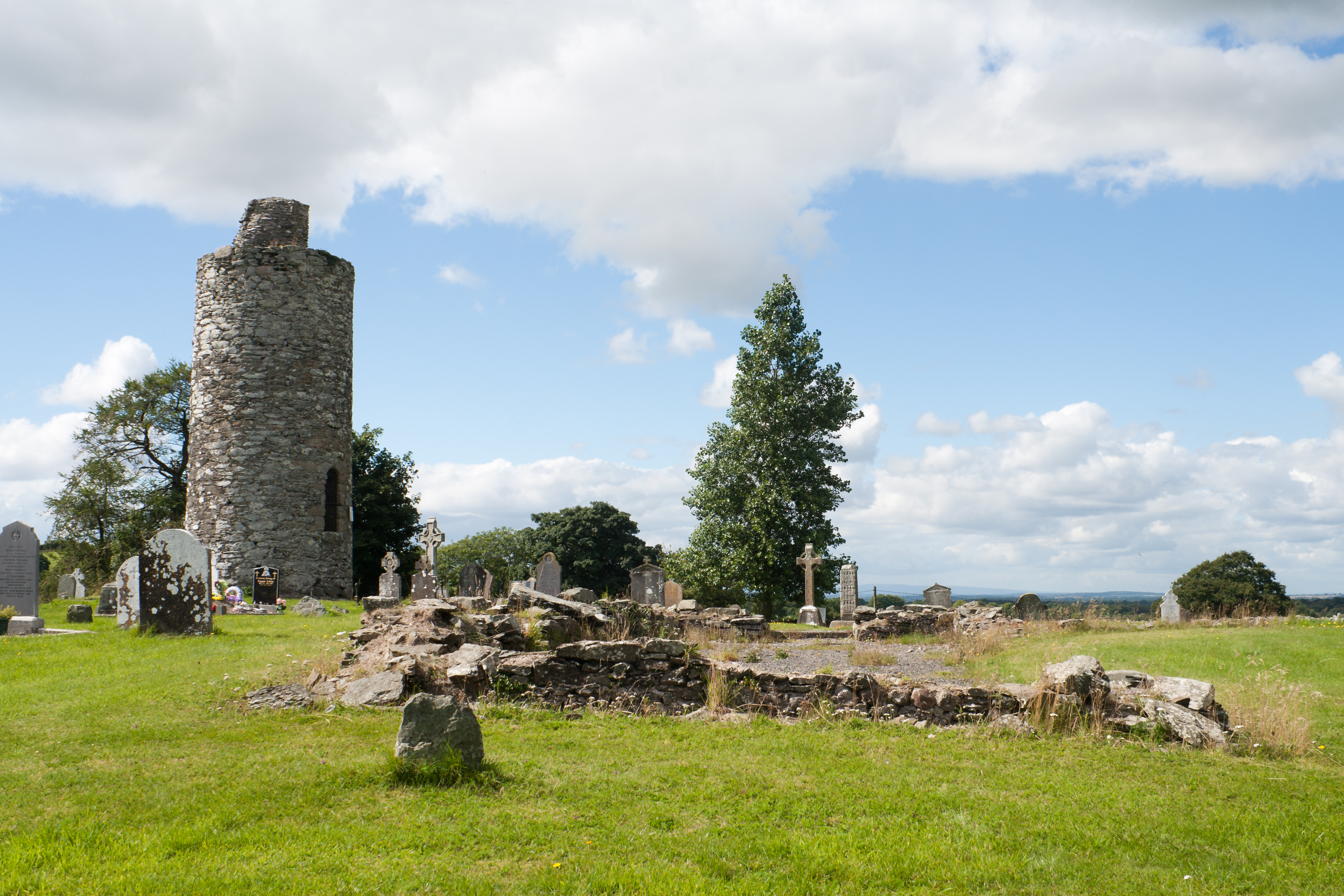
Old Kilcullen Church and Round Tower

Iserninus is referred to as a bishop in the Annals of Ulster, and he is recorded as having begun his mission in 439 AD. According to Patrick F. Moran, St. Patrick assigned the valley of the Liffey to Auxilius and Iserninus.

== Modern studies ==
According to historian Charles Thomas, "The weight of current opinion is perhaps in favour of associating Secundinus, Auxilius, and Iserninus with Palladius rather than with Patrick."

A tradition at Aghade, County Carlow, holds that Iserninus founded a church there and was later buried there. Iserninus is also called the founder of the church at Old Kilcullen, where he was reputedly appointed as bishop by St. Patrick, possibly along with St. Mactail. Kilcullen began as a monastic settlement, in the period around 448. The choice of location for the settlement was perhaps related to the nearby Dun Ailinne, a ceremonial site related to the kings of Leinster.

== Sources ==
- Dumville, David N. "Auxilius, Iserninus, Secundinus and Benignus." In Saint Patrick, AD 493-1993, ed. by David N. Dumville and Lesley Abrams. Studies in Celtic history 13. Woodbridge: Boydell, 1993. pp. 89–105. ISBN 0-85115-332-1.
