= Moninne =

Irish saint

Saint Moninne
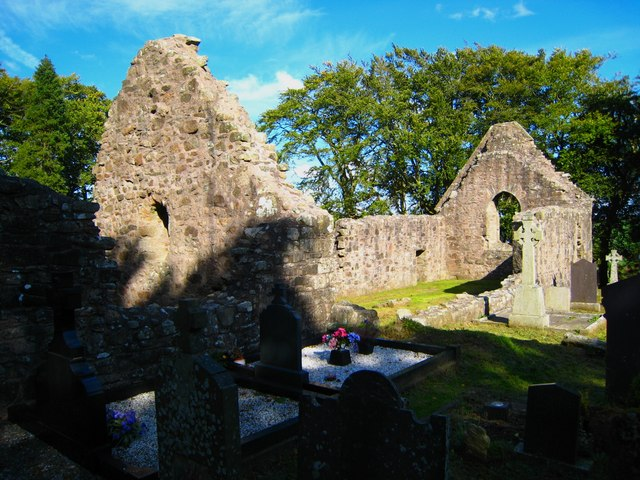
- Killevy Church (10th century), reputed site of Morinne's convent
- Born: c.435 Donaghmore, County Down
- Died: c.517
- Venerated in: Roman Catholicism, Orthodox Church
- Feast: 6 July

Saint Moninne or Modwenna of Killeavy was one of Ireland's early female saints. After instruction in the religious life, she founded a community, initially consisting of eight virgins and a widow with a baby, at Slieve Gullion, in what became County Armagh. They lived an eremitical life, based on that of Elijah and Saint John the Baptist. Moninne died in 517. Her feast day is 6 July.

== Life ==
Moninne was born around 435 in the Donaghmore area of County Down. Her father was Machta, King of the territory stretching from Louth to Armagh and her mother was Comwi or Coman daughter of one of the northern kings. It was said that she was baptised and confirmed by Saint Patrick. When he was passing through the lands of Machta he stopped at her parents' house and predicted that Moninne's name would be remembered throughout time. It was said that she was veiled by Saint Patrick also.

There are a couple of versions of the name Moninne, for example, Darerca, Blinne or the spelling Moninna which means in Irish "My Ninna" or "My Daughter". A legend says that she got the name "Moninna" when she cured a dumb man and the first word he uttered was "Ninna Ninna". It was also said that when she was a baby the first word she said was Ninna.

She is said to have been brought up by St. Brigid of Kildare. Monenna founded a number of convents in Scotland and England and also founded a nunnery in Faughart, County Louth, One night the nuns were disturbed by sounds of profane merriment from the homesteads lower down the hill, and when they enquired the cause were told that there was a wedding party in one of the houses. Moninne and her sisters found this a distraction and determined to seek for themselves a place more suited to their way of life.

She took her Sisters west to the island of Begerin to be guided in the ways of monastic life by her uncle, one of the first Irish bishops, St. Ibar. The community eventually returned from Leinster to the north of Ireland, settling first at Faughart, then at Killeavy. Faughart Church was founded by Saint Moninne in honour of Brigid. The nunnery at Killeavy (meaning "church of the mountain"), initially consisting of eight virgins and a widow with a baby boy. The lad, whose name was Luger, was lovingly raised by the sisters and in time became a bishop.

She died around the year 517 and was buried at Killeavy.

== Veneration ==
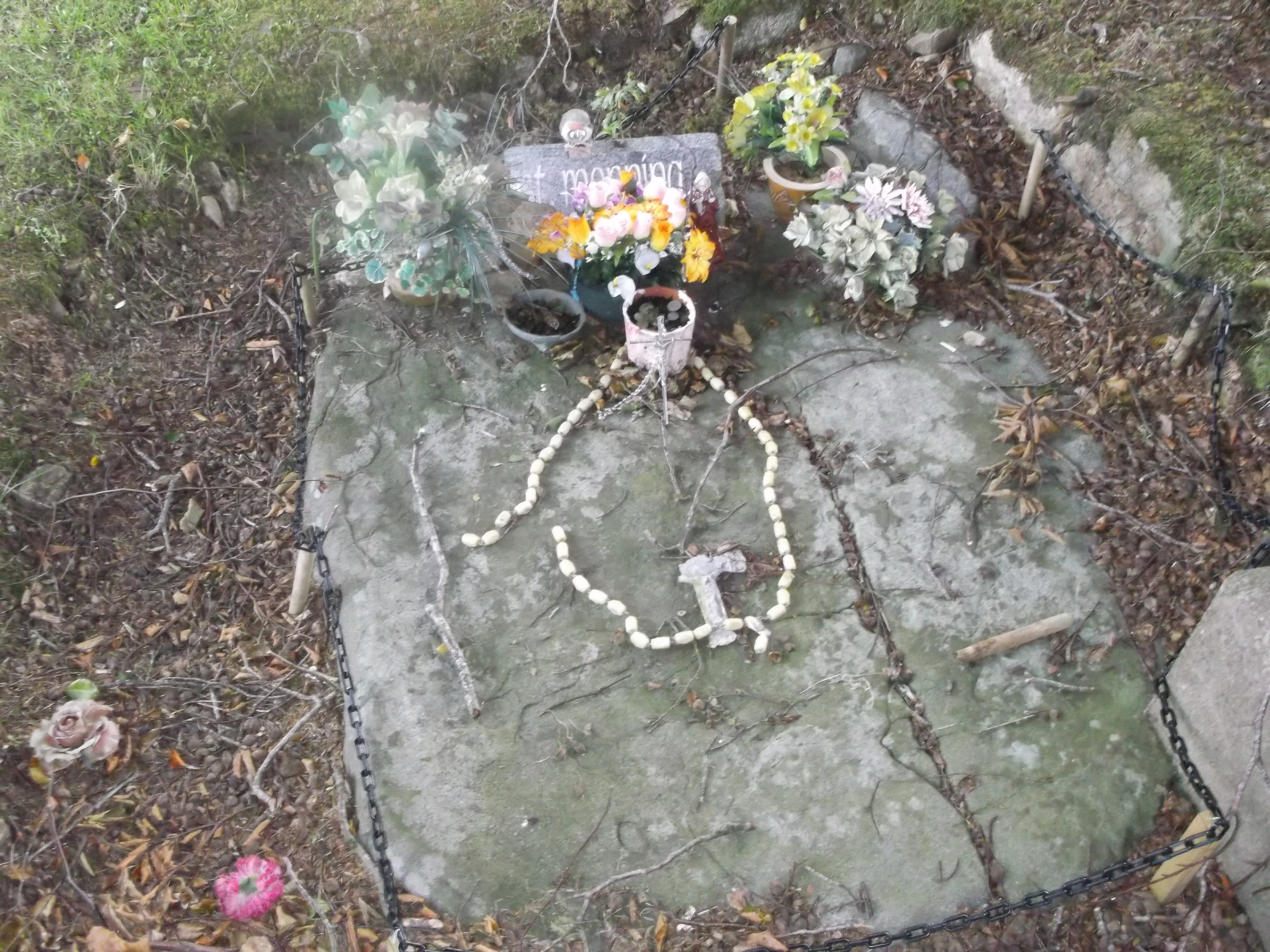
The grave of St Monnina, Killeavy Graveyard

A large granite stone covers the supposed grave of St Moninne and on days when the Pattern (which was the anniversary of the day on which a church had been dedicated to a saint) was celebrated, prayers were said at this spot and the pilgrims continued to her Holy Well further up the slopes of Slieve Gullion, returning to this gravestone for the final prayer.

The pattern day of St Moninne was 6 July, but with the coming of persecution to the Catholic faith, these religious ceremonies were banned by law. After the suppression of the Pattern in 1825, the existence of the Holy Well was forgotten about but it was re-discovered by Father James Donnelly, C. C., Meigh in 1880.

Saint Moninne's Well is marked by a large white cross. The Pattern was revived in 1928 and appears to have survived until 1934. A shrine was placed over the well with a statue Of the Virgin Mary. The inscription on the well reads "Tobhar Naoimh Blathnaidh". The scene was a historical setting for the Holy Year Pilgrimage on 4 August 1974.

Monnine's feast day is celebrated on 6 July and is marked by pilgrims visiting her well. The Gaelic Athletic Association club founded in Killeavy in 1888 is Killeavy St Moninna's GAC.

== See also ==
- Darerca
