= Dunshaughlin =

Commuter town in County Meath, Ireland

Dunshaughlin Dún Seachlainn/Domhnach Seachnaill
- Town
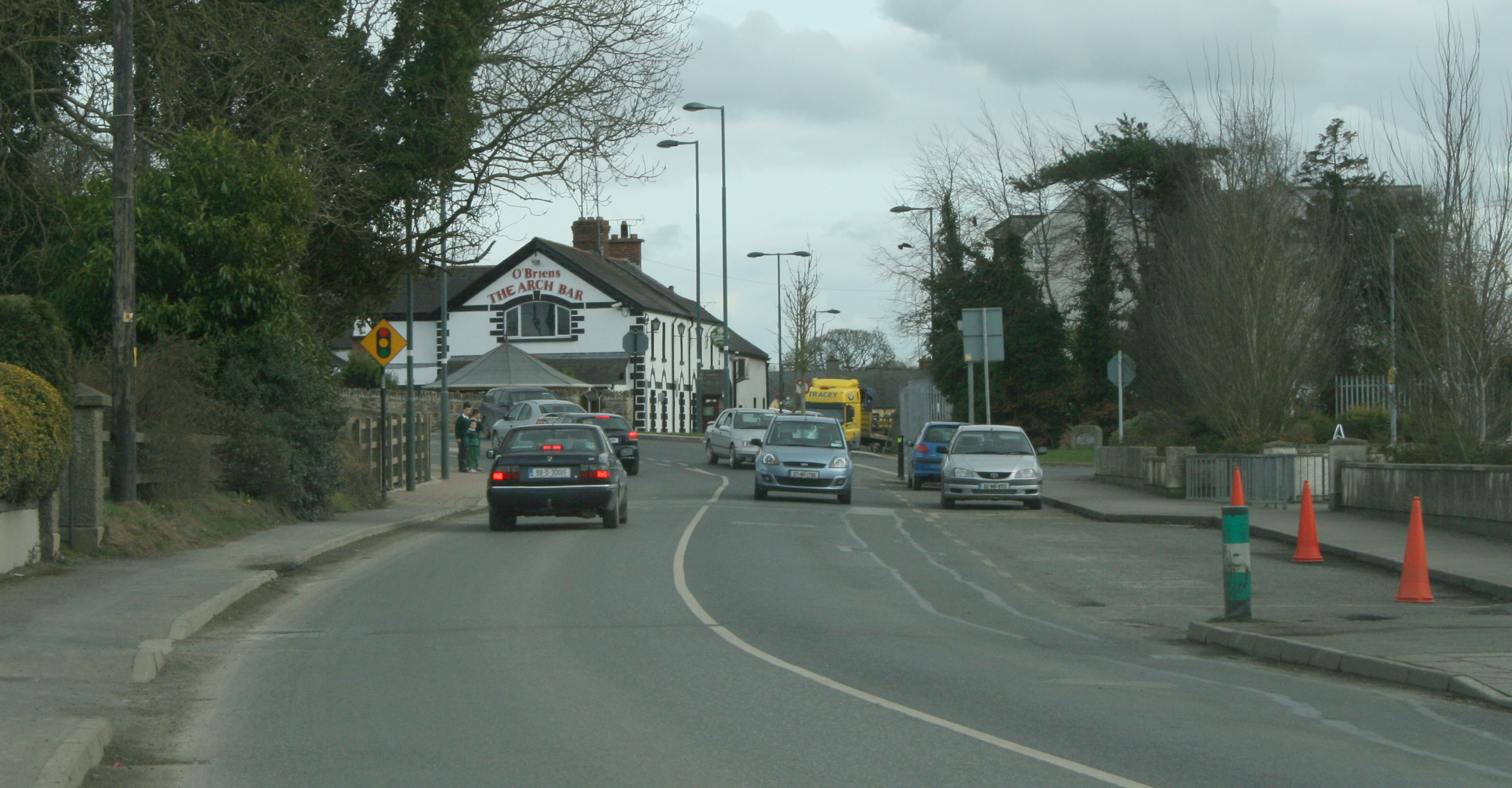
- The Drumree Road in Dunshaughlin

- Location in Ireland
- Coordinates: 53°30′42″N 6°32′22″W
- Country: Ireland
- Province: Leinster
- County: County Meath
- Elevation: 105 m (344 ft)

Population (2022 census)
  - Total: 6,644
- Time zone: UTC+0 (WET)
  - Summer (DST): UTC-1 (IST (WEST))
- Irish Grid Reference: N965526

Dunshaughlin (Irish: Dún Seachlainn, meaning 'the fort of Seachlainn' or locally Irish: Domhnach Seachnaill, meaning 'St Seachnall's Church') is a town in County Meath, Ireland. A commuter town for nearby Dublin, Dunshaughlin more than tripled in population (from 2,139 to 6,644 inhabitants) between the 1996 and 2022 censuses. The town is in a townland and civil parish of the same name.

== History ==
=== Foundation ===
Dunshaughlin is named for Saint Seachnall, who established a church there in the 5th century, where he is said to be buried. The oldest reference to the place name is an entry in the Annála Uladh from the year 801, where the name takes the form "Domnaig Sechnaill". The word "Domnach", used in this way, can be attributed to churches which originate from the beginnings of Christianity in Ireland. North of the ruins of the original church, on the site, there is a Church of Ireland church built in 1814 with funds from the Board of First Fruits.

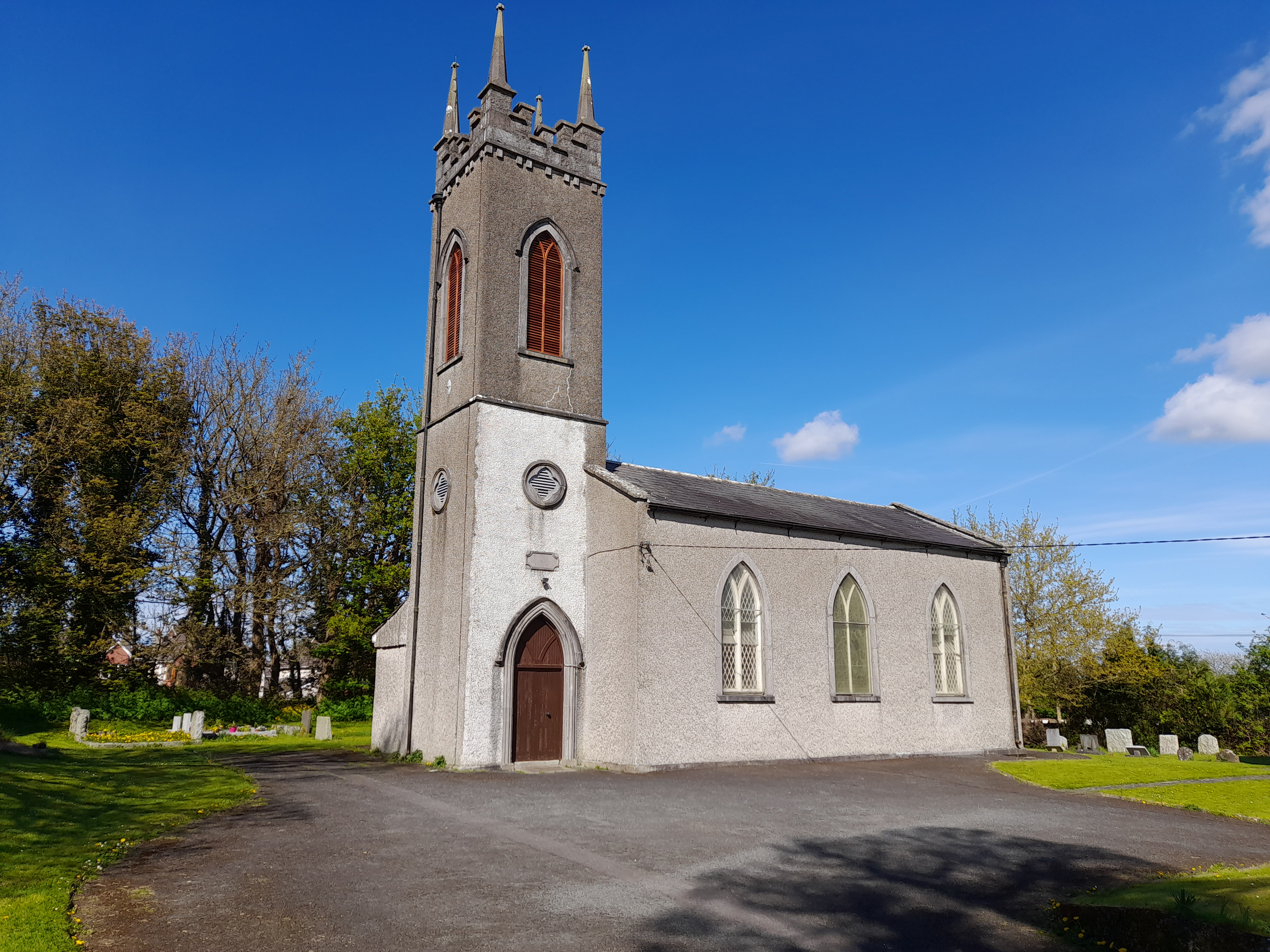
Dunshaughlin Church of Ireland

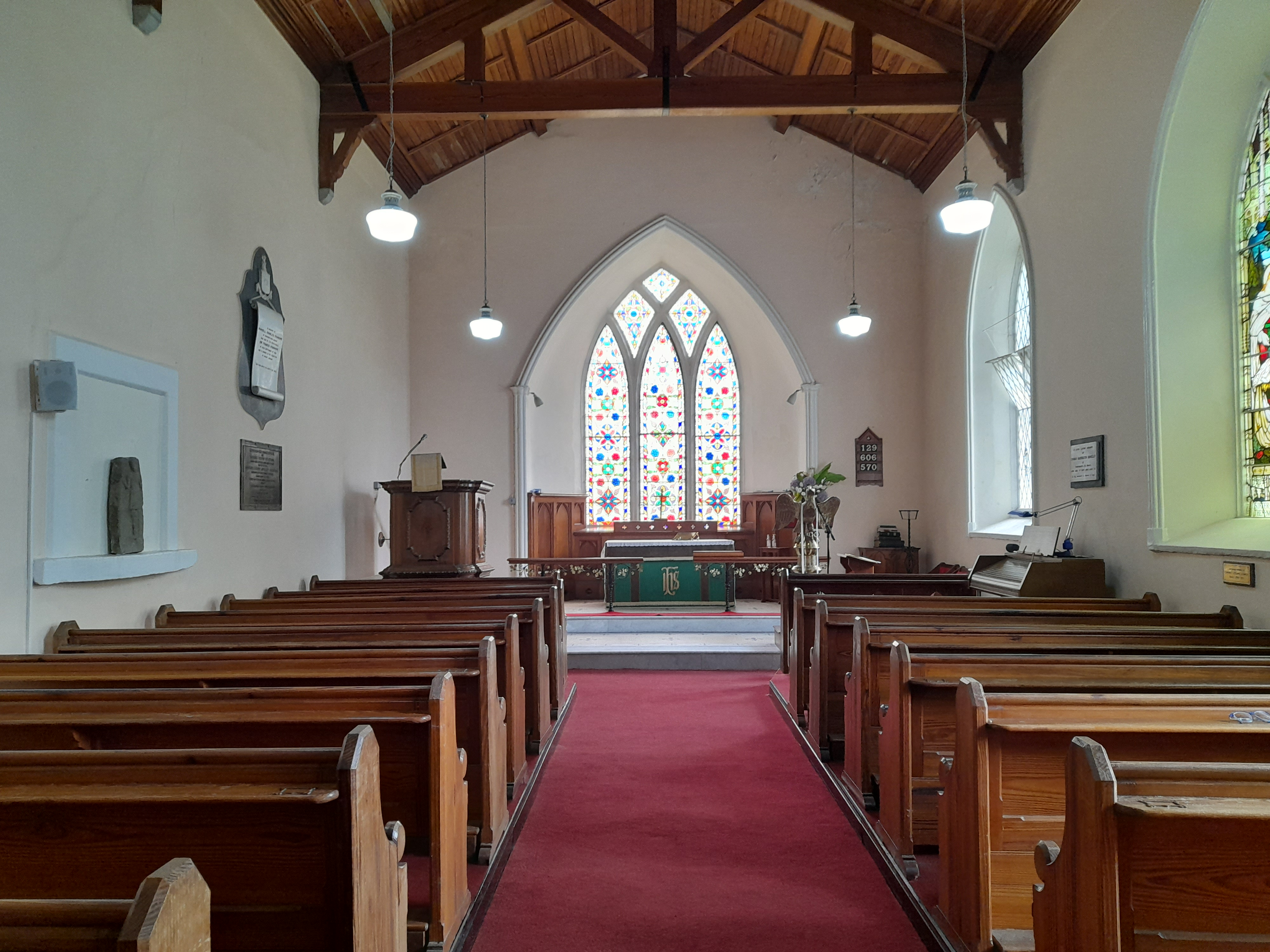
Dunshaughlin Church of Ireland interior

Máel Sechnaill mac Domnaill was an ancestor from which the principal family of Brega, Ó Maoilsheachlainn, is descended. Dunshaughlin (or more specifically, the townland of Lagore) is famous for an ancient crannóg or settlement from the 7th century where a number of Irish antiquities were discovered.

=== Workhouse ===
Approximately 2 km (1.2 mi) from the village is a preserved workhouse from the Great Famine. This workhouse was erected in 1840–41 on 2 hectares (4.9 acres), south of Dunshaughlin. Designed to accommodate 400 inmates, it cost about £6,000 to build, all told. It was declared fit for habitation on 12 May 1841 and received its first admissions on 17 May. During the famine period, in the mid-1840s, elements of the workhouse were converted to accommodate additional inmates, and a burial ground was located to the rear. Occupancy declined after the famine. During the First World War, the building was used to house Belgian refugees, some of whom died there and were buried in the paupers' graveyard. In 1920–21, the building was taken over by the Black and Tans, who used it as a barracks during the Irish War of Independence. After the workhouse system was abolished in 1922, following the conclusion of the war and the establishment of the Irish Free State, the facility served as a school, courthouse, and factory (among other things). As of 2002, parts of the building were being used as a guest residence.

== Demographics ==
Dunshaughlin is 29 km from Dublin on the R147, and is a growing satellite town of that city. In the 20 years between the 1991 and 2011 census, the town's population had more than tripled from 1,275 inhabitants to 3,903 people. By the time of the 2022 census, this had further increased to 6,644.

== Amenities ==
Several housing estates centre on the main street, with multiple retail units consisting of newsagents, pubs, takeaway food outlets, clothing stores, and banks. There is also a business park on the outskirts of the town.

Dunshaughlin houses a number of public amenities, including a library, a health centre, and the Meath County Council civic offices. A community and sports centre was opened on the grounds of Dunshaughlin Community College in 2000. The centre is operated by a voluntary board of management.

== Education ==
Dunshaughlin has three primary schools, Gaelscoil na Ríthe, St. Seachnall's and Dunshaughlin Community National School. It has two secondary schools, Dunshaughlin Community College and Coláiste Ríoga. St. Seachnall's was founded in 1835. As of 2019, it had 552 students, both boys and girls. Gaelscoil na Ríthe (an Irish medium school) was established in 1985 by a group of parents from the Dunshaughlin, Drumree, and Culmullen areas. A new building was constructed in 1996 and, as of 2019, the school had an enrollment of 226 pupils. Dunshaughlin Community College (DCC), established in 1933, is a co-educational school which is part of the Louth and Meath Education and Training Board. Construction was completed on an extension to the school in 2013, and was officially opened on 29 November 2014.

== Transport ==
Dunshaughlin is located at a junction between the R147 and R125 regional roads, approximately 1 km from the M3 motorway. It is served by Bus Éireann commuter bus services to Dublin, including route 109, which generally runs at a frequency of every half-hour.

== Sport ==
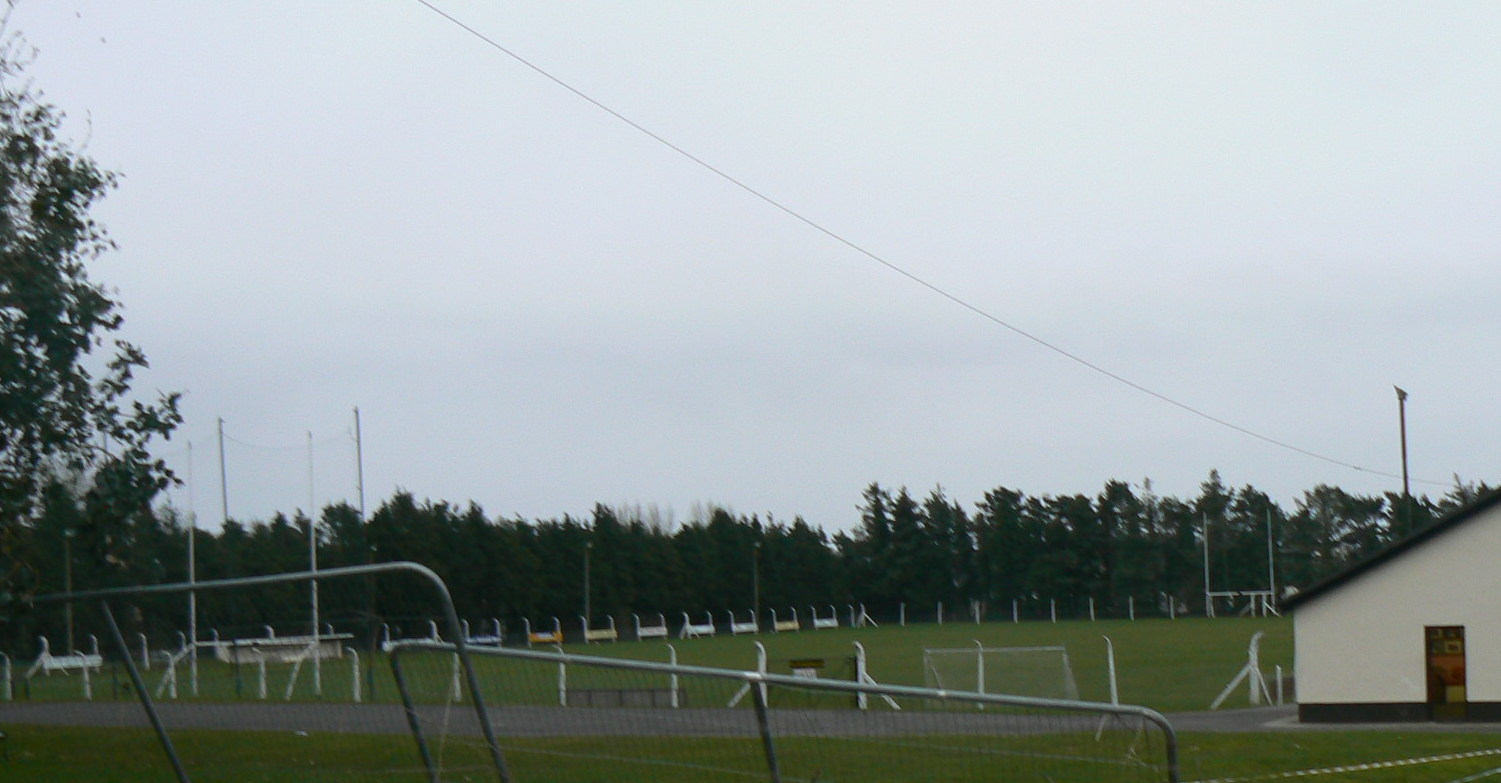
Dunshaughlin GAA grounds

The town is represented in sport by men's and women's Gaelic football teams. The Dunshaughlin GAA men's team were Meath Senior Football Championship for three consecutive seasons (2000 to 2003). The local soccer club, Dunshaughlin Youths, fields teams in the North Dublin Schoolboy's League.

The local basketball club, Dunshaughlin Rockets, compete in both the North East Basketball League and the Dublin Ladies Basketball League. Dunshaughlin Community College has won a girl's under 16's All-Ireland title, a second-year girl's All-Ireland and a boy's under 19's All-Ireland title.

Dunshaughlin Athletic Club is traditionally considered a long-distance running club. However, club members have also entered juvenile sprinting competitions. The town's golf course is the "Black Bush Golf Club". Around 3 km (1.9 mi) outside the village, a new golfing resort designed by Jack Nicklaus has been created at Killeen Castle. The course hosted the 2011 Solheim Cup.

The town also has a strong association with horse racing, in particular National Hunt racing. The leading flat race sprinter Sole Power, dual winner of both the Nunthorpe Stakes and the King's Stand Stakes, is trained near the town by Edward Lynam.

== Events ==
The Dunshaughlin Harvest Festival is a three-day culture festival, usually taking place towards the end of September. It is a non-profit event, organized and run by local volunteers.

== Gallery ==
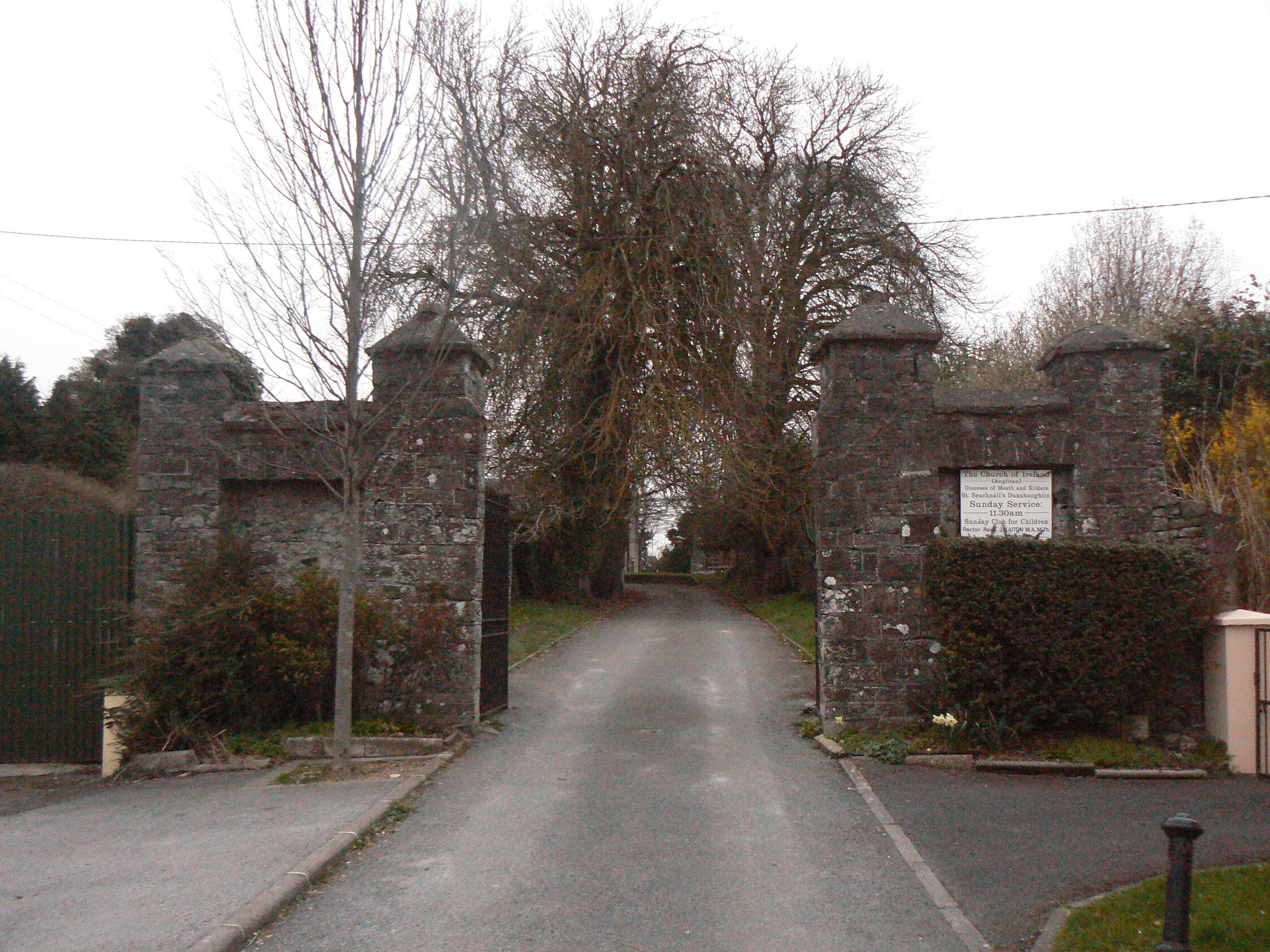
Entrance to Saint Seachnall's Church of Ireland, site of the village's original ecclesiastical foundation in the fifth century AD

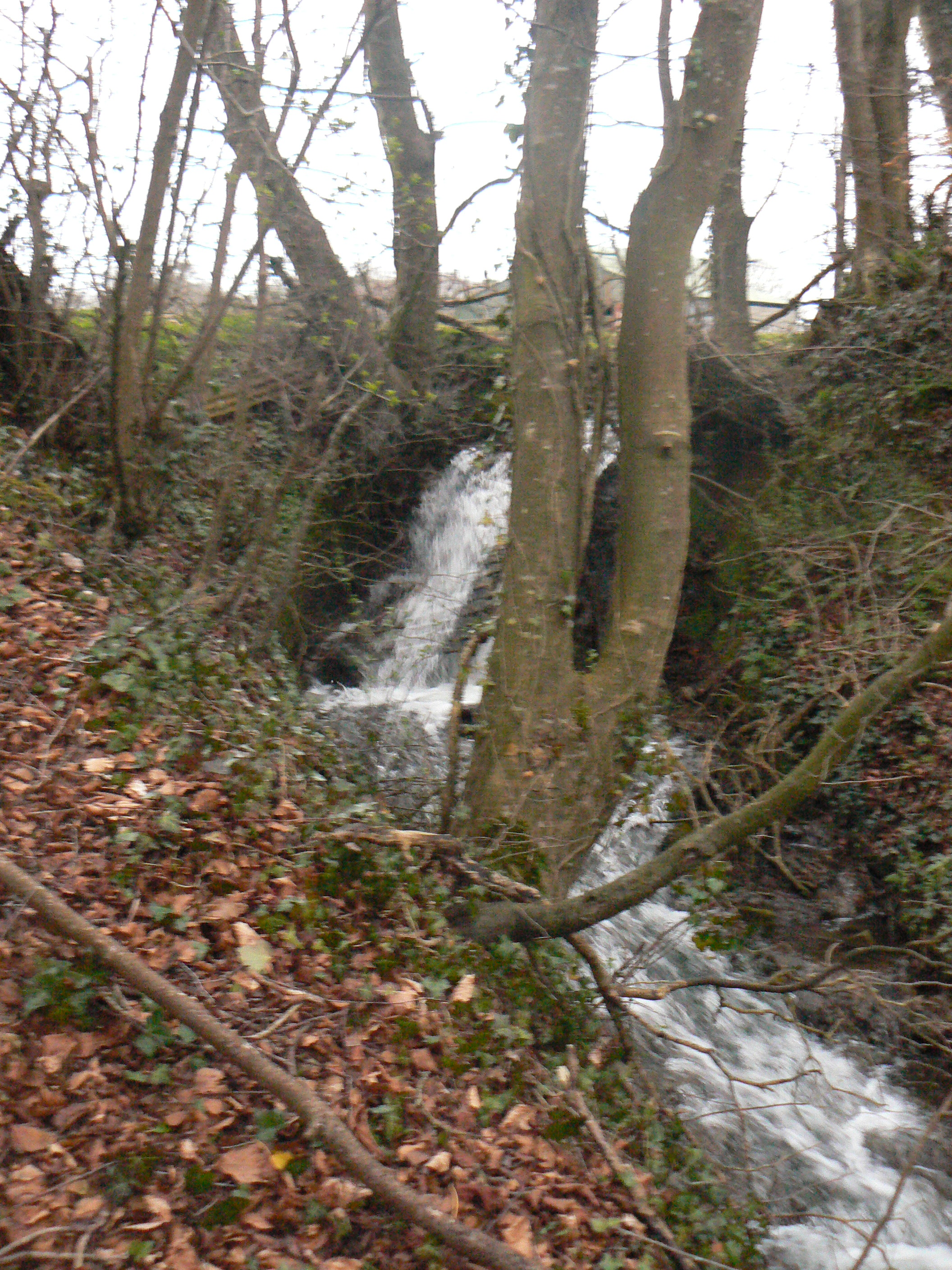
Waterfall next to the old mill on the Killeen Road

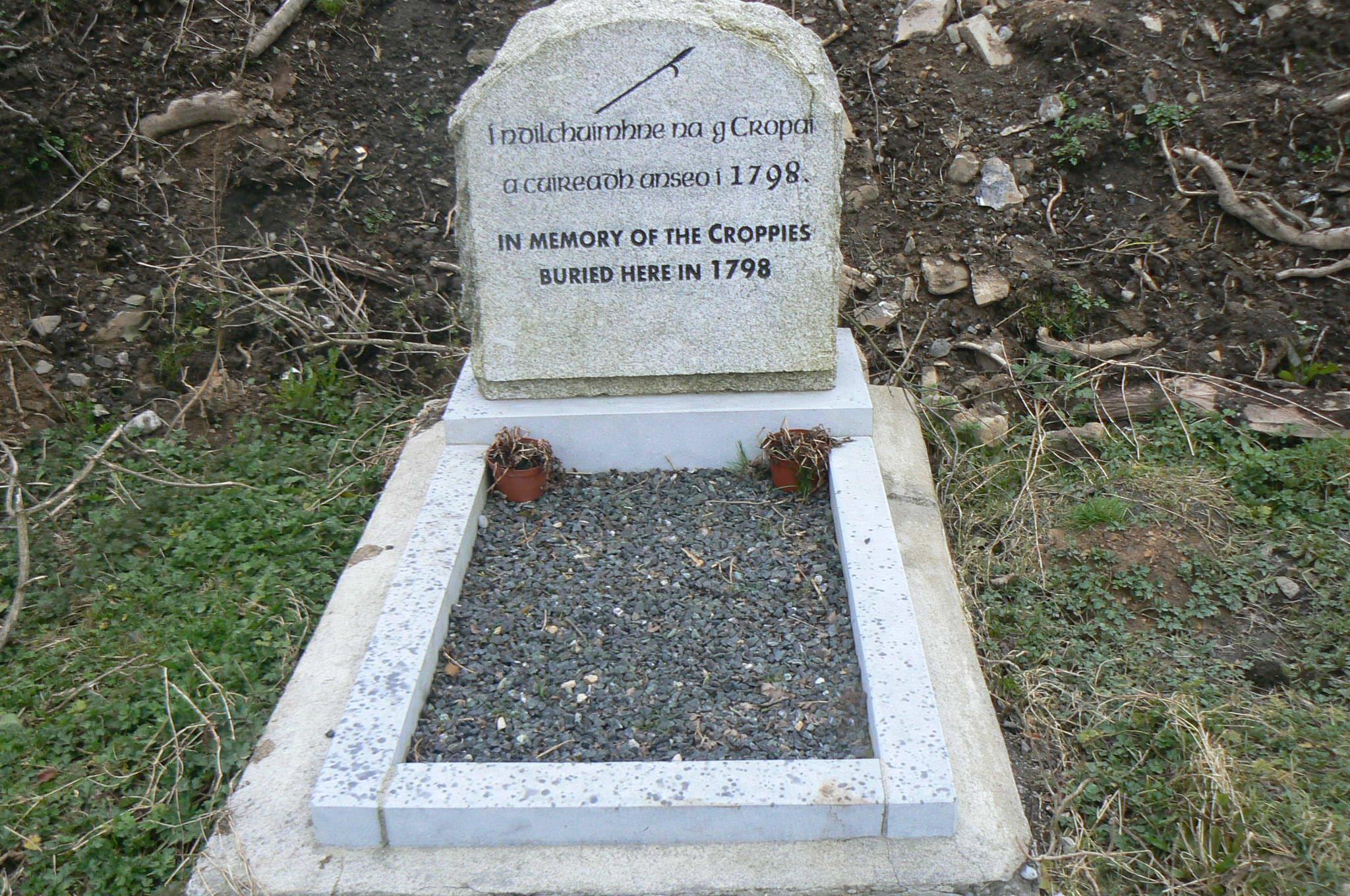
1798 Croppy Commemoration, Croppy Lane, Trim Road

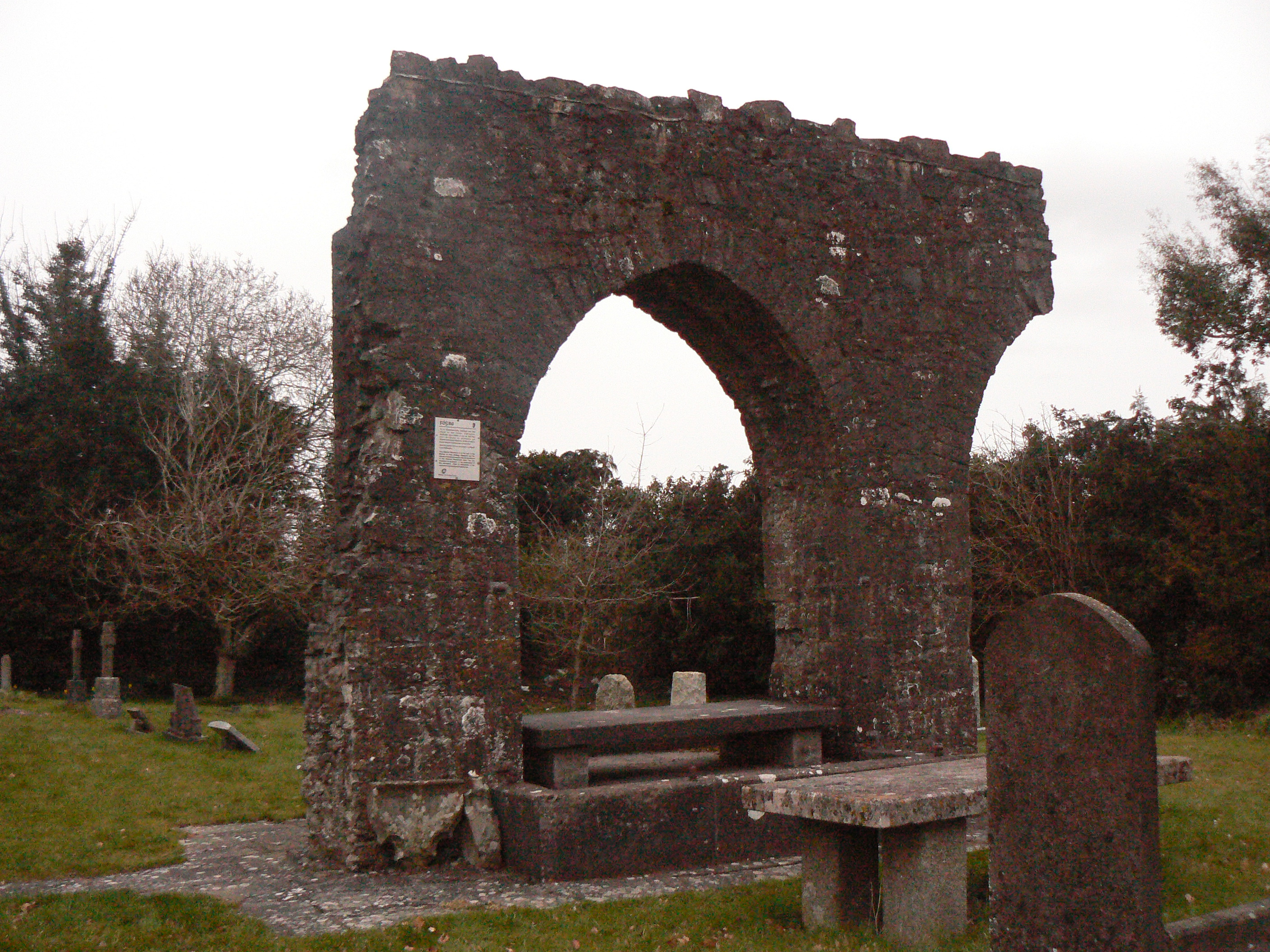
Remains of the monastic site of Saint Seachnall, Domhnach Seachnaill, from which the town's name derives

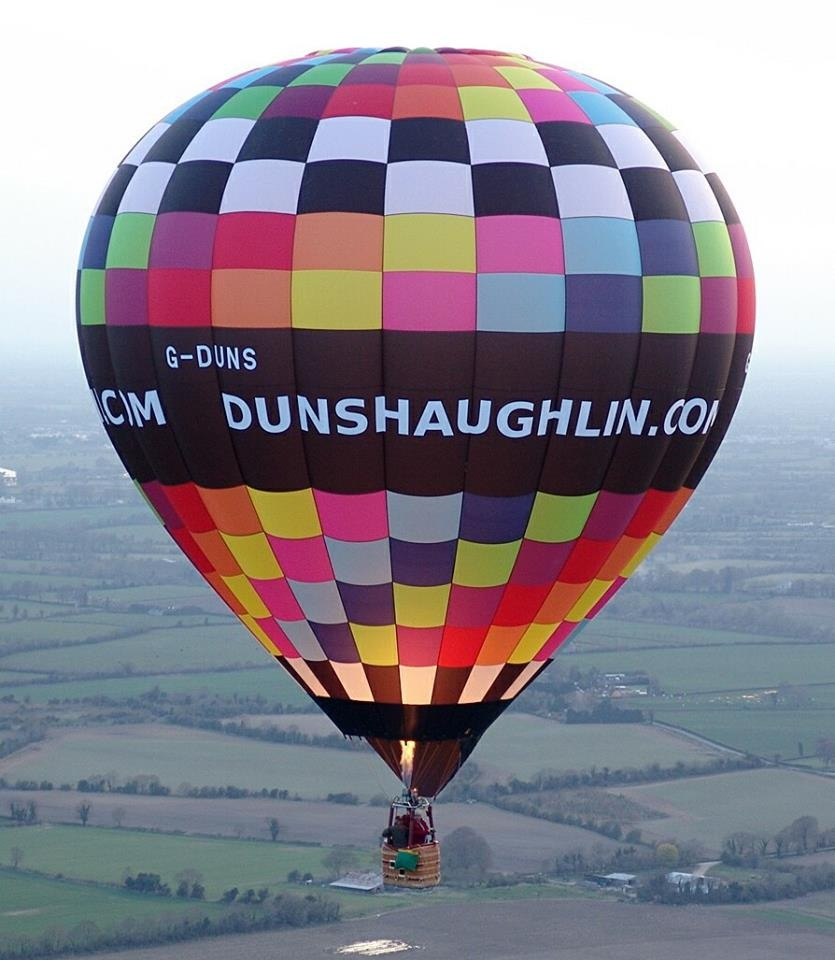
A hot-air balloon over north-west Dunshaughlin

== See also ==
- List of towns and villages in Ireland
