= Auxilius of Ireland =

Saint Auxilius
- Died: ~459; Ireland
- Venerated in: Roman Catholic Church
- Feast: (see below)

Saint Auxilius, or Usaille, (d. ca. 459) was an early Christian missionary of Ireland who is associated with Saint Patrick, Saint Seachnaill (Secundinus), and Saint Iserninus in establishing Christianity in the south of that island, although more recent studies tend to associate him with the earlier Palladius.

== Traditional view ==
Auxilius may have been ordained a deacon at Auxerre with Patrick and Iserninus. Sabine Baring-Gould believes that Iserninus and Auxilius were Celts. "They would not have been of much use to [Patrick] had they not been fluent speakers of the Celtic language, and we may assume that they were Celts, either from Armorica, Cornwall, or Wales.” He was the nephew of St. Patrick, the son of Patrick's sister, Darerca, and her husband, Restitutus, a Lombard. He was one of nine brothers, eight of whom became bishops in Ireland. His early life and training are obscure, but he appears to have studied in Gaul at the school of St. Germanus. According to John Francis Shearman, in 438, six years after Patrick left for Ireland, Germanus sent Auxilius and Iserninus to assist him.

== Later perspective ==
The first documentary evidence that exists is an entry in the Irish Annals recording the arrival of St. Sechnall and his brother St. Auxilius "to help St. Patrick". Auxilius seems to have been important in the early Irish Christian church as there is a reference to a Synod of Bishops held in 448 or 450, headed up by Patrick, Auxilius and Iserninus. This would suggest that he had some special eminence or authority among the bishops, for the laws made there would have been binding on the whole Irish church at the time.

He has also been called a brother of Seachnaill. However, historians have suggested that the connection of Secundinus with St Patrick was a later tradition invented by Armagh historians in favour of their patron saint and that Secundinus is more likely to have been a separate missionary, possibly a companion of Palladius. There is a general consensus among historians that Palladius established a mission in what is today County Meath. Auxilius and Secundinus were probably his assistants. Auxilius is called the founder of the church at Killashee, near Naas in County Kildare; Killashee being derived from Kill (the Irish for church) + Usaille.

Both the annals of Innisfallen and Clonmacnoise give 458 A.D as the date when this cleric died, but his date of death is also given as 454 or 455.

== Veneration ==
His feast day varies in old martyrologies. In the Martyrology of Gorman, his feast day is 7 February. In the Book of Obits, of Christ Church, his feast day is 19 October, but other martyrologies give the feast day of 16 April or 16 September. In the Martyrology of Tallaght it is 19 March but in the Annals of the Four Masters, the text gives 27 August as the day of Auxilius' death.
