= Gars Abbey =

Monastery in Germany

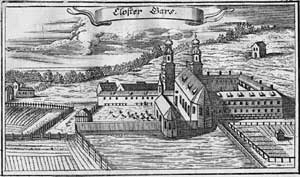
- Copper engraving of the Monastery by Johann Ulrich Kraus from the "Churbaierische Atlas" of Anton Wilhelm Ertl, 1687

- Location within Bavaria
- Interactive map of Gars Abbey

Monastery information
- Order: Congregation of the Most Holy Redeemer
- Established: 768

People
- Founder: Tassilo III, Duke of Bavaria

Architecture
- Functional status: In use

Site
- Coordinates: 48.1565°N 12.2763°E

Gars Abbey (German: Kloster Gars) is a monastery on the Inn River in Bavaria, Germany, in the town of Gars am Inn. It was founded in 768 and has been occupied by Benedictine monks, Augustinian Canons Regular, and most recently Redemptorists.

== History ==
The monastery was founded in 768 by the cleric Boso from Salzburg for Tassilo III, Duke of Bavaria. It was dedicated to saints Mary and Radegund and at first was under the Benedictine rule. The monastery was originally called "Cella Garoz". For centuries it belonged to the archbishopric of Salzburg. In 1128 Bishop Conrad I of Salzburg transferred the monastery to the Augustinian Canons. They erected the present monastery building after 1122. Archbishop Eberhard II of Salzburg (1200–46) took over the advocacies of the Au and Gars Augustinian collegiate churches from their secular lords, the Mödlings.

The monastery is interesting for the relics of the martyr Felix. Ceiling paintings and an altar show the importance of this saint to the monastery. The painted cast stone Pieta on a side altar dates from 1430, and was formerly the main altar of the church. The monastery was home to scholars who valued old alphabets. A late 16th century book from the monastery has a marginal gloss in perfectly correct runic writing.

In 1648 the Swedes pillaged and devastated the town and the monastery. Under Provost Athanasius Peitlhauser the monastery was rebuilt between 1657 and 1659. The monastery wings and the Church of the Assumption were renovated by Italian artists to their present form. The pilaster church was rebuilt after 1661, one of the first Baroque churches in the region. The work was done under the direction of Christoph Zuccalli^{(de)} and his two cousins Kaspar^{(de)} and Enrico^{(de)} from Roveredo in the Swiss Canton of Grisons. The Zuccalli brothers, who made frescos at Weyarn, Gars and Au, were among the small number of foreigners who could get significant commissions.

== Post-secularization ==
In 1803 the Augustinian Canons were expelled as part of the Bavarian secularization program. The buildings and inventory were sold to private individuals. In 1855 the Redemptorists showed an interest in Gars Monastery, and in 1858 they formally re-opened the monastery. Between 1873 and 1894 under the Kulturkampf only three fathers and brothers were allowed to remain. After the monastery was restored in 1894 the first missionaries were sent to Brazil. From 1907 to 1973, Gars housed a Philosophical-Theological College for the Redemptorists.

== Today ==
As of 2013 the monastery housed about 16 brothers and 13 priests. The brothers follow various professions including work as bakers, butchers, gardeners, carpenters and tailors. The Fathers work as ward missionaries, helping in the surrounding communities and in education. The monastery has a plant nursery that is well known in the region. The building complex also houses the teaching and administrative rooms of the Gymnasium Gars and an institute for teacher training.

== Notable people ==
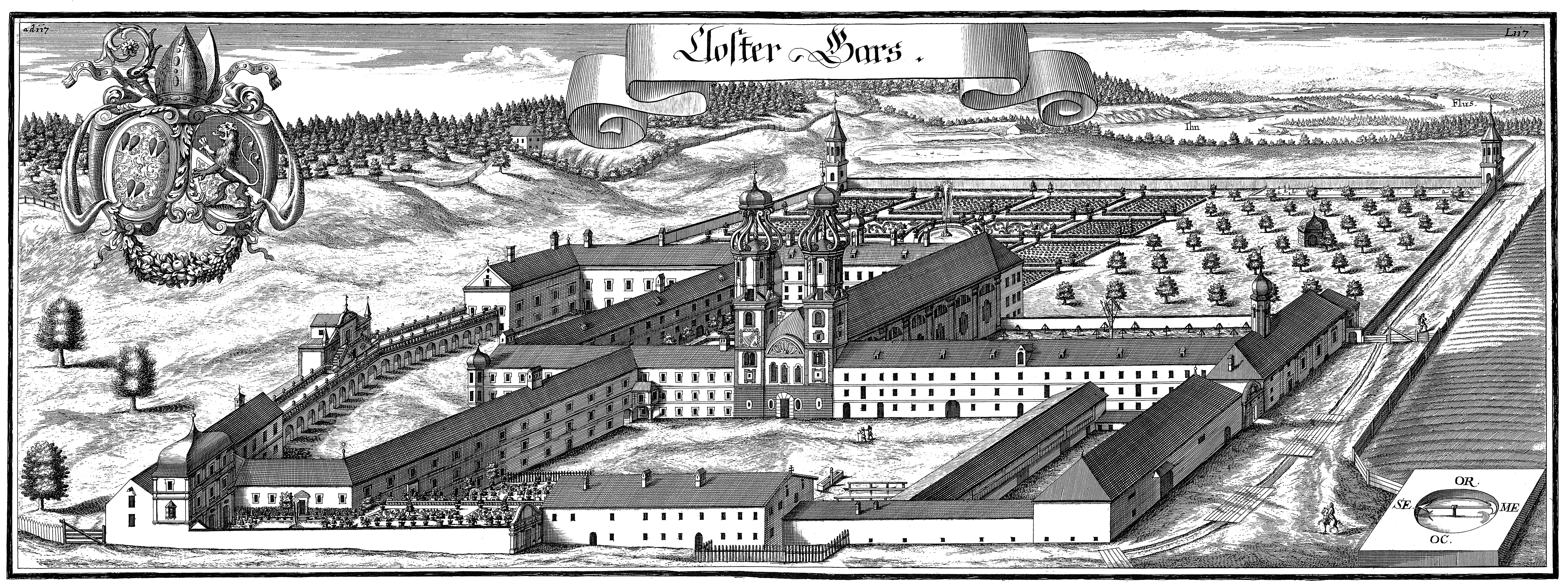
View by Michael Wening (1645-1718)

The stigmatist Louise Beck^{(de)} (1822–79) of Gars had influence over her confessors concerning church policies. She was in personal contact and correspondence with Maria von Mörl^{(de)}. A gifted mystic, Beck had visions from her childhood, and a cult formed around her after she developed the stigmata of Christ. Many priests and believers asked for her directions to save their souls, and gave her their life confessions. This inevitably led to dependency and bondage, where they had to be "faithful children" of the "mother" to avoid eternal ruin. She lived in the monastery from 1862 until her death.

After completing his training as an artist, the painter Max Schmalzl joined the Redemptorist Order at Gars Abbey as a novice in November 1871. Schmalzl died at the monastery in Gars am Inn on 7 January 1930 at the age of 79.

Kaspar Stanggassinger' entered the Redemptorist novitiate at Gars in 1892. He was ordained a priest in Regensburg in 1895 and was assigned to training future missionaries at the minor seminary of Dürrnberg, near Hallein. In 1899 he was transferred to Gars as director of the new seminary there, but died of peritonitis on 26 September 1899. His body was transferred to the side chapel of the Church of Gars in 1935, and in 1988 he was beatified.

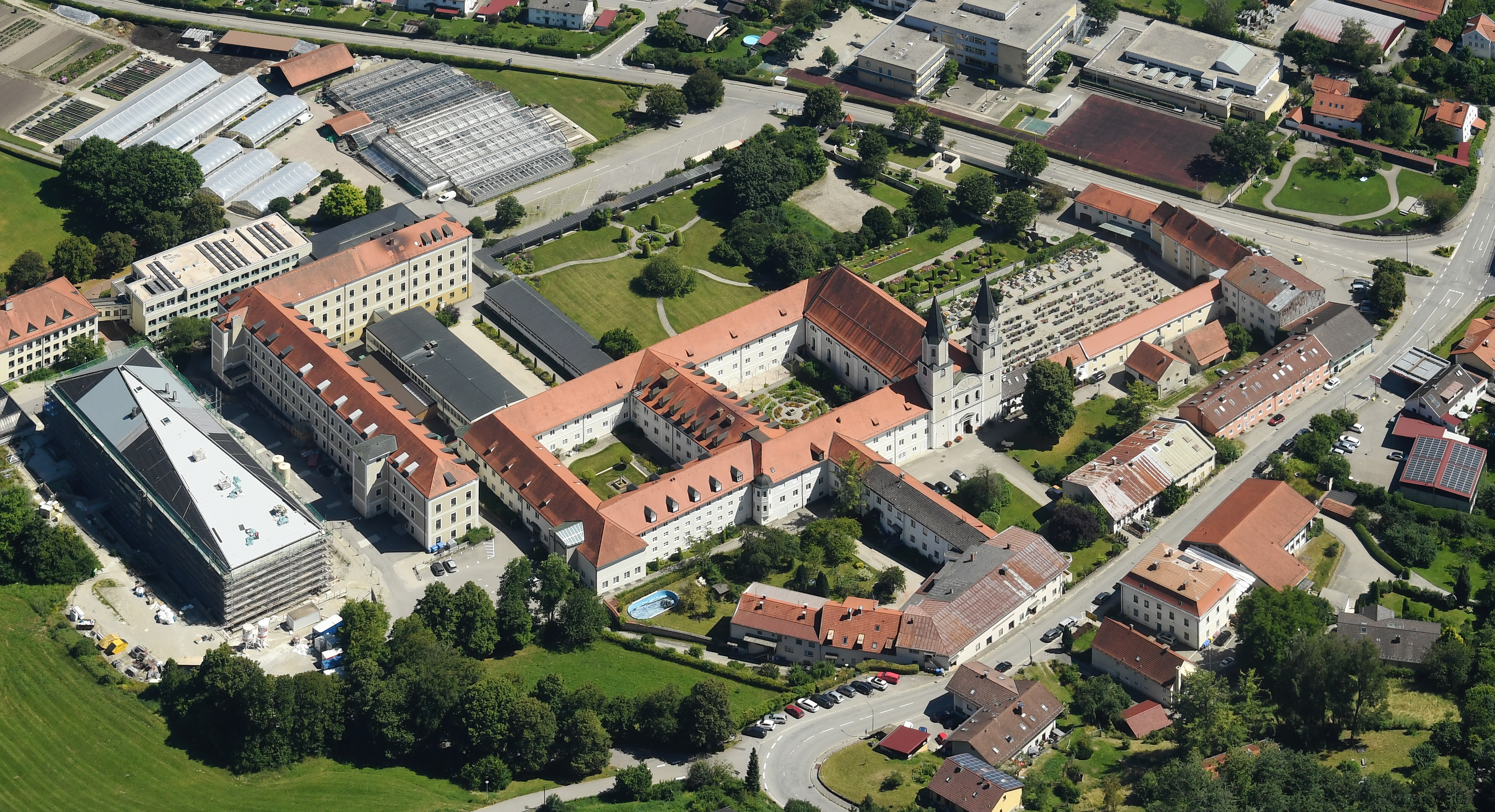
Aerial view of the monastery

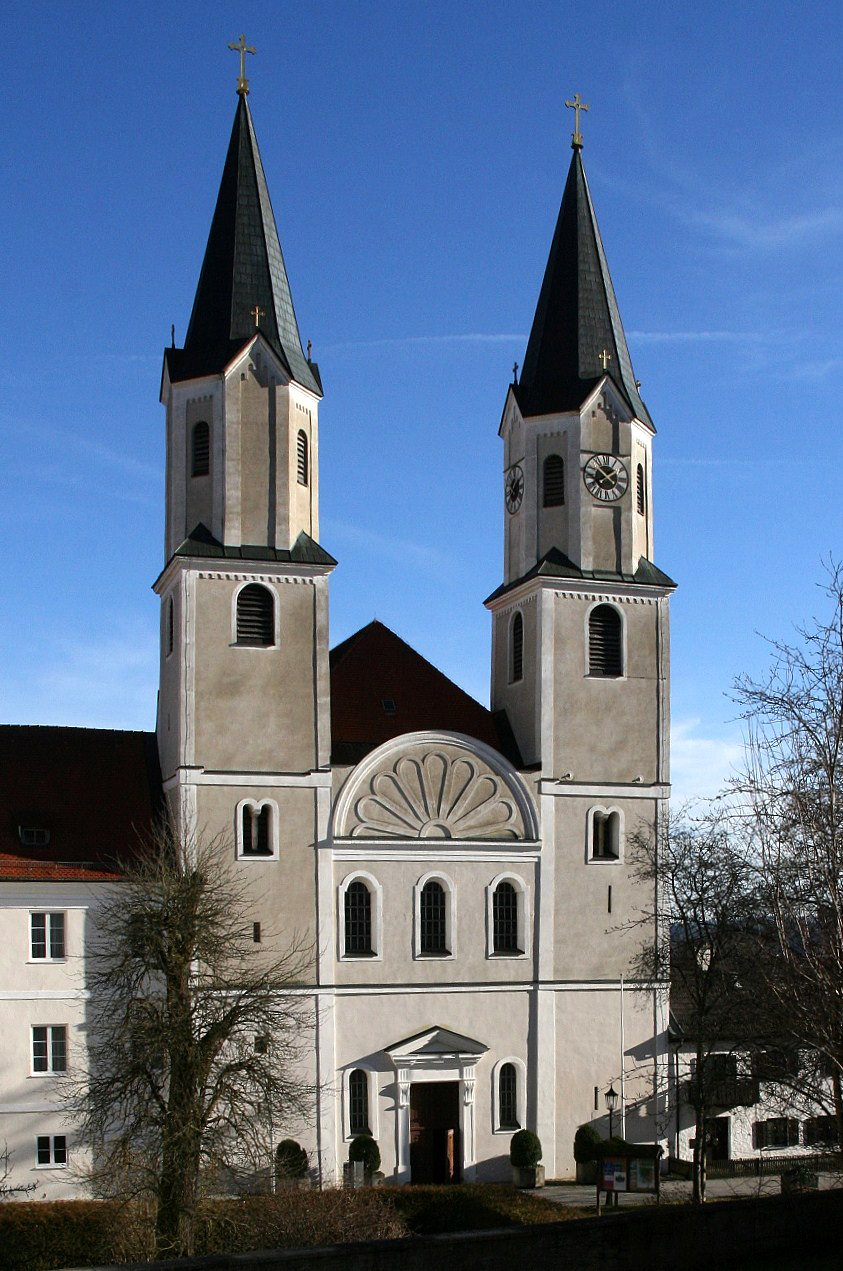
Front of the monastery church

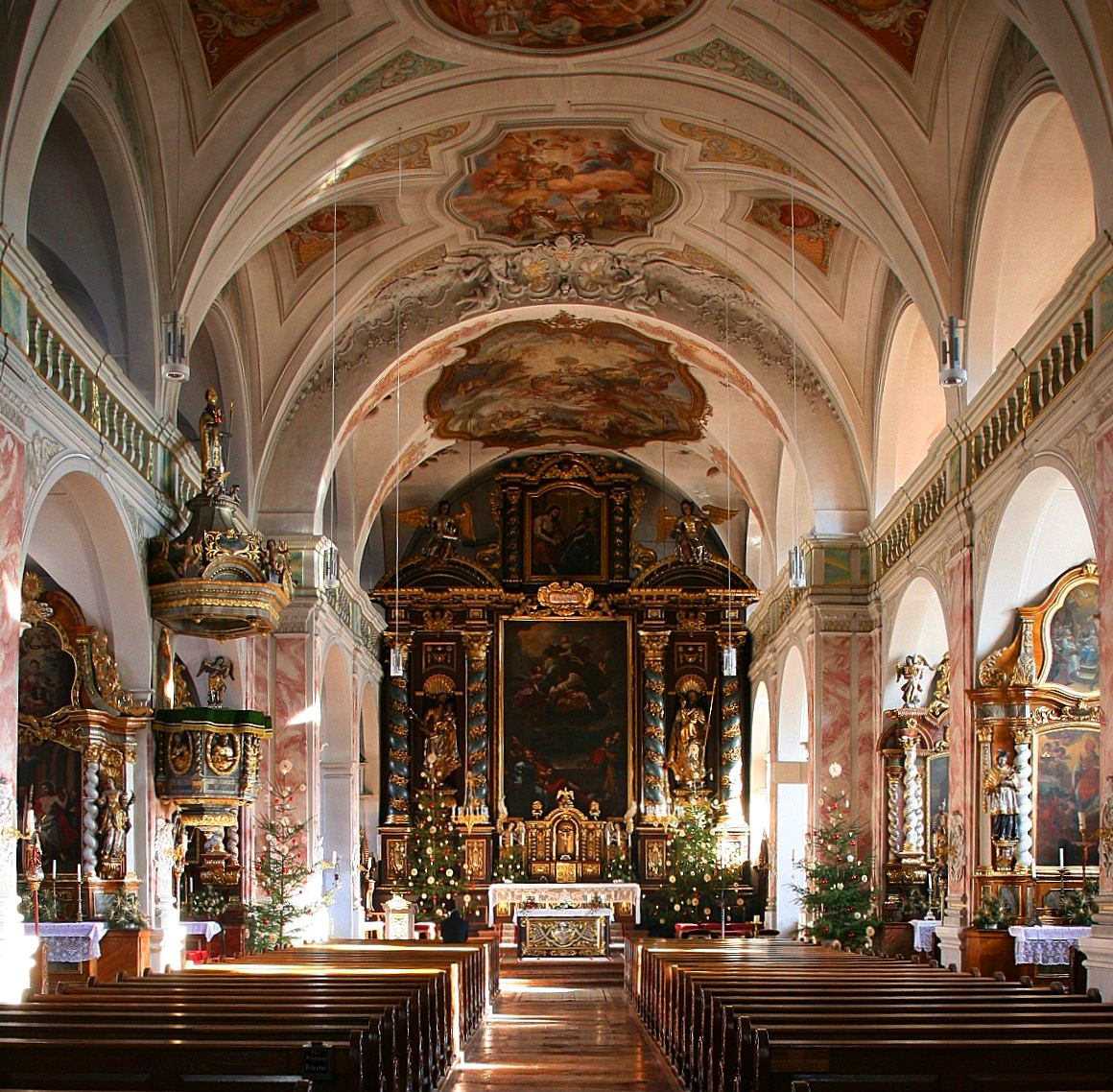
Interior of the monastery church

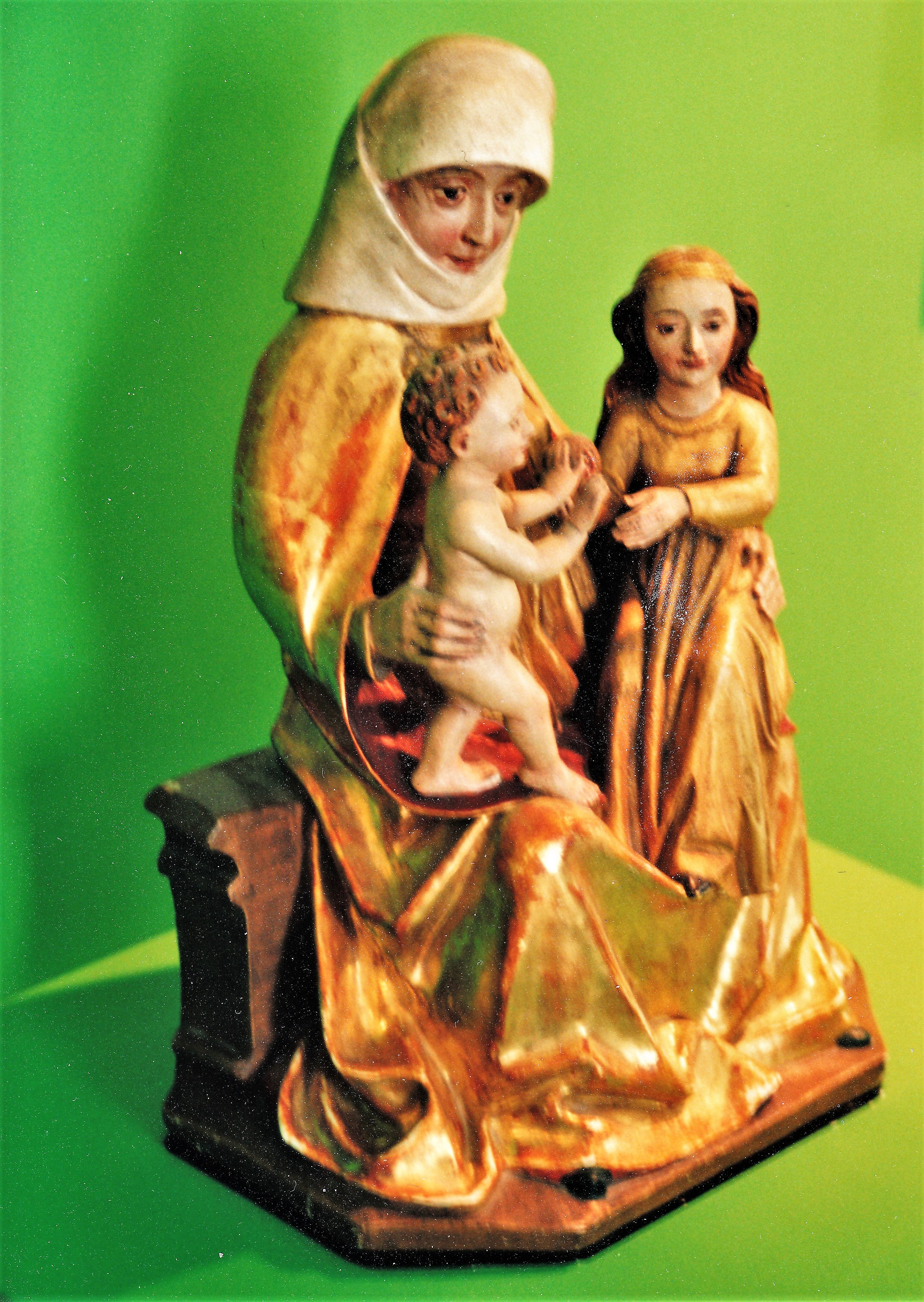
St. Anne (late gothic sculptural group)

== Augustinian canons regular ==
The Augustinian canons regular were:

1. Eppo I.
2. Eberwin
3. Hugo, 1129, 1158
4. Heinrich I., 1160
5. Friedrich I.
6. Egenolf, 1170
7. Heinrich II., 1171, 1177
8. Johann I., 1179, c. 1183
9. Berthold I., 1185, 1195
10. Adelung (Adelwin), 1198, 1210
11. Heinrich III., 1219
12. Friedrich II., 1229
13. Ulrich (?)
14. Conrad I., 1288
15. Thomas I., † 1307 (?)
16. Jakob I.
17. Gundaker, † 1317 (?)
18. Seyfrid
19. Hartnid, † 1323 (?)
20. Berthold
21. Stephan
22. Thomas II.
23. Jakob II.
24. Zacharias, 1381
25. Albert von Leuzendorf, 1383
26. Jakob III., 1388
27. Jakob IV. Hinterkircher, 1414–1420
28. Conrad II. Dezlsamer, † 1435
29. Thomas III. Surauer, 1435–1455
30. Christian Nadler, 1455–1459
31. Johann II. Mosheimer, 1459–1469
32. Johann III. Stockhaimer, 1469–1494; received pontifical vestments in 1484
33. Jakob V. Zollner, 1494–1510
34. Johann IV. Schambacher, 1510–1516
35. Joachim, 1516
36. Sebastian Peltram, 1516–1528
37. Caspar von Leuzenbrunn, 1528–1533
38. Valentin Rhem, 1533–1540
39. Georg I. Edenhueber, 1540–1556
40. Georg II. Hadersperger, 1557–1591
41. Michael Wagnereck, 1592–1620
42. Peter Mittmann, 1620–1643
43. Ubald Mayr, 1643–1648
44. Athanas Peitlhauser, 1648–1698
45. Gelasius Ludwig, 1698–1742
46. Paulus Hoelzl, 1742–1751
47. Joseph Schmid, 1751–1771
48. Floridus Fak, 1772–1794
49. Augustin Hacklinger, 1794–1803, † 1830

== Sources ==
- "Die Klostergemeinde". Kloster Gars.
- Fr. Santo Arrigo (2 September 2010), "Kaspar Stangassinger", redemptorists.ca, Congregation of the Most Holy Redeemer
- Freed, John B. (1984), "The Counts of Falkenstein: Noble Self-Consciousness in Twelfth-Century Germany", Transactions of the American Philosophical Society, 74 (6), American Philosophical Society: 1–70, doi:10.2307/1006394, JSTOR 1006394
- "Geschichte". Kloster Gars.
- Hartig, Michael (1935), Die oberbayerischen Stifte (in German), vol. I: Die Benediktiner-, Cisterzienser- und Augustiner-Chorherrenstifte, München: G. J. Manz, DNB 560552157
- "Kloster Gars". Landratsamt Mühldorf.
- Markus (4 November 2010). "Gars am Inn".
- Rosenfeld, Hellmut (1955–1956), "Die Inschrift des Helms von Negau", Zeitschrift für Deutsches Altertum und Deutsche Literatur (in German), 86 (4), S. Hirzel Verlag: 241–265, JSTOR 20654760
- Scharli, Jolanda Cecile (2012), Auffällige Religiosität: Gebetsheilungen, Besessenheitsfälle und schwärmerische Sekten in katholischen und reformierten Gegenden der Schweiz (in German), disserta Verlag, ISBN 978-3-95425-016-5
- Schopf, Hubert (1997), "Augustinian Canons", in Peter Dinzelbacher und James Lester Hogg (ed.), Kulturgeschichte der christlichen Orden in Einzeldarstellungen, Translated by Theodore J. Antry, O. Praem., Stuttgart: Alfred Kröner Verlag
- Schwarzenberger-Wurster, Monika (21 June 2010), Frater Max Schmalzl (1850–1930). Katholische Bildpropaganda in der christlichen Kunst des späten 19. Jahrhunderts (PDF) (in German), University of Regensburg
- Wolf, Hubert (2006), Index: der Vatikan und die verbotenen Bücher (in German), C.H.Beck, ISBN 978-3-406-54371-5
