= Schmalzl =

Schmalzl is a surname. Notable people with the surname include:

- Eberardo Schmalzl (born 1950), Italian alpine skier
- Helmuth Schmalzl (born 1948), Italian alpine skier
- Max Schmalzl (1850–1930), German redemptorist, engraver, and painter
