= Gymnasium Gars =

Gymnasium in Gars am Inn, Bavaria, Germany

Coordinates: 48°09′26″N 12°16′37″E

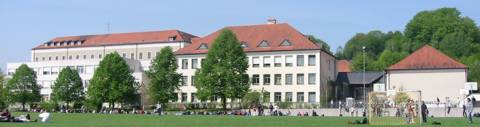
Gymnasium Gars

The Gymnasium Gars is a Gymnasium (high school) in Gars am Inn, Bavaria. Situated on the river Inn in the Gars valley, it was founded as a school of Latin by Augustinians before 1582 AD. It became a state school in 1972. It grew quickly and had about 1000 students and 70 teachers in 2006. Today, a part of the school is still found inside the local Redemptorist monastery, but there were extensions in the 1980s and 1990s.
