= Max Schmalzl =

German painter

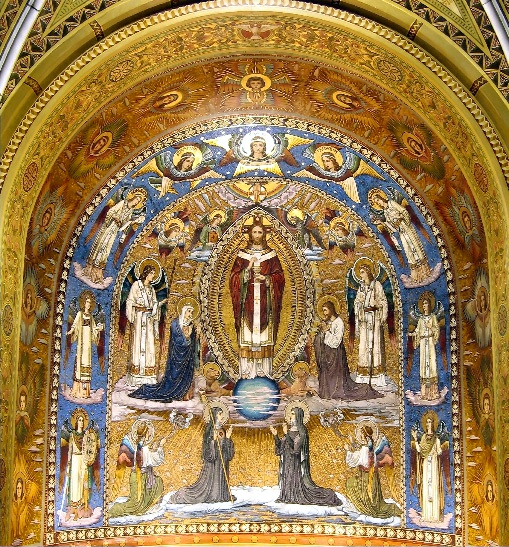
- Born: 7 July 1850; Falkenstein, Bavaria
- Died: 7 January 1930 (aged 79); Gars am Inn
- Education: Königliche Kunstgewerbeschule, Munich
- Known for: Painter, illustrator, designer

Max Schmalzl (7 July 1850 – 7 January 1930) was a German Redemptorist lay brother who worked as a painter, illustrator, and designer in the style of the Nazarene and the Beuron schools. His intricate woodcuts and illustrations are ubiquitous in Catholic missals and devotional volumes from the late 1800s and early 1900s.

== Biography ==
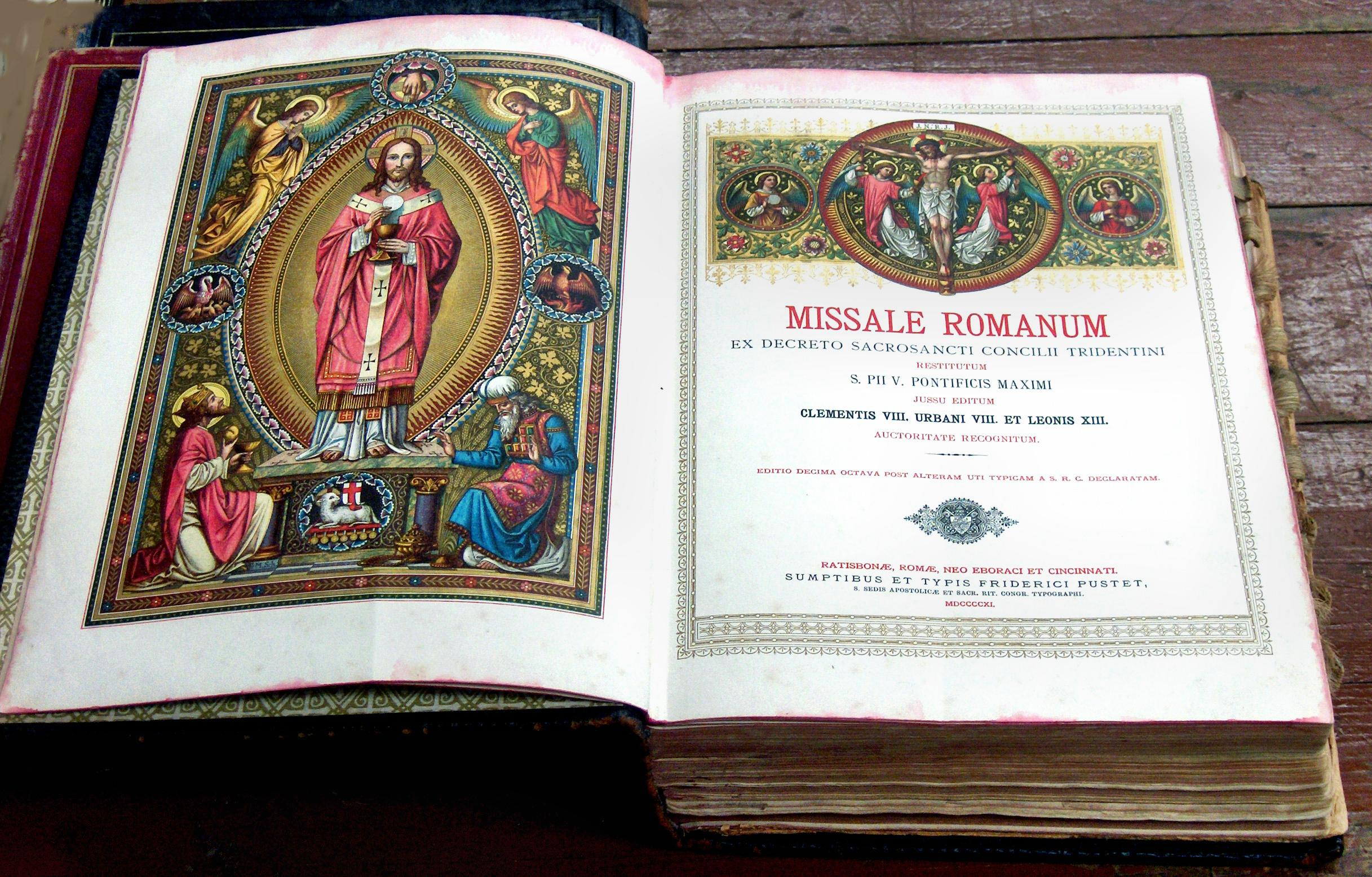
A 1911 Pustet edition of the Missale Romanum with illustrations by Max Schmalzl

Born on 7 July 1850 in Falkenstein, Bavaria, Max Schmalzl came from a Catholic family that was both religious and devoted to ecclesiastical art. His older brother, Peter Schmalzl (1835–1874), was a Redemptorist priest who was a painter in his own right, and his nephew Rudolf Schmalzl (1890–1932) was also a well-known church painter. Schmalzl would later occasionally collaborate with his nephew, most notably in the decoration of the pilgrimage church of Halbmeile near Deggendorf (1910).

Schmalzl attended the Königliche Kunstgewerbeschule (Royal School of Applied Arts) in Munich where he was a student of Theodor Spieß (1846–1920). Schmalzl received an education as a decorative painter and was recognized for his talents such that he received a royal scholarship of 200 guilders in September 1871.

After completing his training as an artist, Schmalzl joined the Redemptorist Order at Gars Abbey in Gars am Inn. He entered the novitiate there in November 1871. He never received priestly ordination, but remained a lay brother.

Schmalzl died at the monastery in Gars am Inn on 7 January 1930 at the age of 79.

== Legacy and influence ==
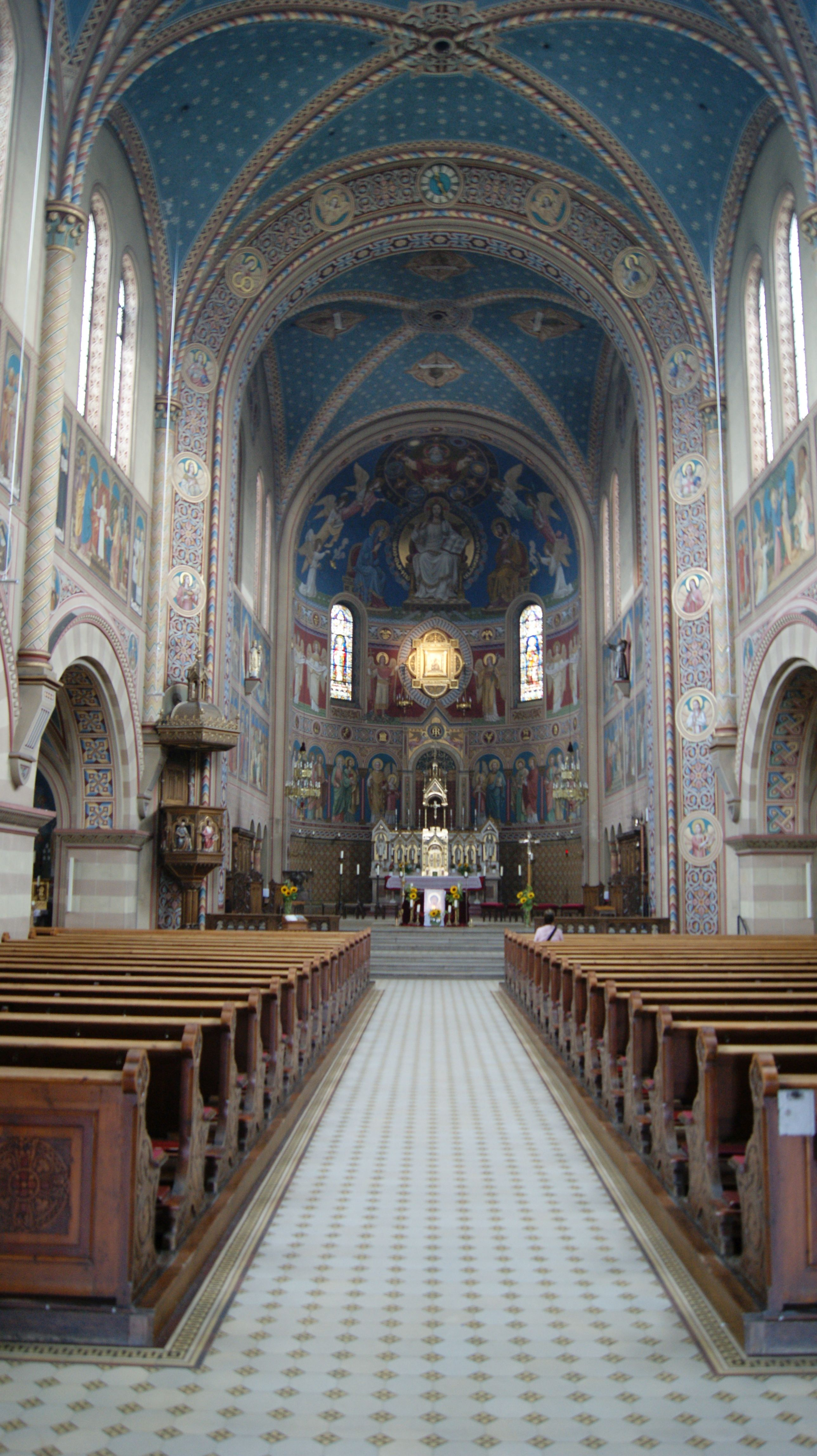
Apse and sanctuary of the Church of Our Lady of Perpetual Help in Cham, Germany. The colorful fresco decoration of the church is of Schmalzl's design.

Because of his monastic lifestyle, Schmalzl was able to be entirely devoted to his work. His artistic subjects were exclusively religious, and his style devotional, dogmatically determined, and precisely drafted. The aesthetic of his work was inspired by the Nazarene school, which looked to the early Italian Renaissance as a model in terms of spiritual purity. Beuronese overtones are obvious, however, in his highly geometric compositions and the general monastic spirit with which he approached his work. In the end, however, his artistic style was uniquely his: he developed a particular style very early in his career, and he remained faithful to that style throughout the entire course of his career.

Monika Schwarzenberger-Wurster, in a 2010 doctoral thesis for the University of Regensburg, evaluated Schmalzl's artistic legacy:

In blatant contrast to his work, which was known and respected by the entire Catholic world at the time, Max Schmalzl led the secluded life of a lay brother in the monastery of Gars am Inn, and placed himself and his artistic abilities at the service of the Church. Schmalzl was so consistent in his religious view of life that, with a medieval sense of modesty, he often declined to sign his works. An evaluation of the details of his life shows Max Schmalzl to be the incarnation of the ideal of the Christian artist, an ideal that was vehemently demanded by Christian art theory in the late 19th century. In Schmalzl, the ideal of the humble, pious, and industrious painter monk, an ideal which the Nazarene and Beuron movements were striving for, reached its final climax. (Note: Gegensatz zu seinem Werk, das von der damaligen gesamten katholischen Welt betrachtet und beachtet wurde, führte Max Schmalzl im Kloster Gars am Inn das zurückgezogene Leben eines Laienbruders und stellte sich und seine künstlerischen Fähigkeiten völlig in den Dienst der Kirche. Schmalzl war so konsequent in seiner religiösen Lebensauffassung, dass er im Sinne des mittelalterlichen Bescheidenheitstopos vielfach auf die Signatur seiner Werke verzichtete. Die Rekonstruktion seiner Lebensumstände kristallisierte Max Schmalzl als Inkarnation des Ideals vom christlichen Künstler heraus. Ein Ideal, das seitens der christlichen Kunsttheorie des fortgeschrittenen 19. Jahrhunderts vehement gefordert wurde. In Schmalzl fand die Vorstellung vom demütigen, frommen und arbeitsamen Malermönch, die bereits die Nazarener und die Beuroner zu verwirklichen suchten, ihren finalen Höhepunkt.)

Because of his monastic background and the fact that he remained faithful to the Nazarene approach until his death in 1930, Schmalzl has been called "the Last Nazarene." At the height of his fame, he was called "the Bavarian Fra Angelico".

== Artistic oeuvre ==
Due to a long-standing collaboration with the Regensburg publishing house Friedrich Pustet, Schmalzl's work became ubiquitous in Catholic circles. (Note: Belegt ist, dass die massenphänomenartige Präsenz seiner Werke in erster Linie aus der fast 50 Jahre währenden Zusammenarbeit mit dem Regensburger Verlag Friedrich Pustet resultierte. Pustet beherrschte im letzten Viertel des 19. Jahrhunderts den Weltmarkt für liturgische Bücher. [...] Die enormen Auflagenzahlen – mitunter erreichte Pustet eine Auflage von bis zu 500.000 Exemplaren – sorgten für eine weltweite Verbreitung von Schmalzls Werken. ("It is proven that the ubiquitous presence of his works resulted primarily from the nearly 50-year-long collaboration with the Regensburg publishing house Friedrich Pustet. Pustet dominated the world market for liturgical books in the last quarter of the 19th century. [...] The enormous circulation figures — [Pustet's publications] sometimes reached a circulation of up to 500,000 copies — made for a worldwide distribution of Schmalzl's works.")) Schmalzl provided the publisher with about 150 illustrations for liturgical works, books for private devotion, and mass-produced religious articles which circulated widely and made his work known throughout the world. In addition to illustrations and painting, Schmalzl also designed sculptures, altars, liturgical instruments and other religious objects, such as reliquaries.

Although many of his illustrations are not signed, Schmalzl did occasionally incorporate the initials "FMS" or "FrMSch" into his work, both of which stand for Frater Max Schmalzl.

=== Notable works ===
In addition to his illustration work for Friedrich Pustet, Schmalzl was also responsible for the decoration and furnishing of several churches.

- Decoration of the monastery chapel of the Church of Our Lady of Perpetual Help in Vilsbiburg, Germany (1873–1880)
- Decoration of the private chapel of the Redemptorists at Gars am Inn, Germany (1885)
- Decoration of the parish church of St. Bartholomew in Kraiburg am Inn, Germany (1893–1897)
- Frescoes in Sant'Alfonso all'Esquilino, Rome, Italy (1898)
- Design of the altar and frescoes in the Bavarian Chapel of San Gioacchino ai Prati in Rome, Italy (1904)
- Design of the frescoes, stained glass, liturgical furnishings and other decorations in the Church of Our Lady of Perpetual Help (Klosterkirche Maria Hilf) in Cham, Germany (1902–1909)
- Mosaic via crucis in the Cathedral of the Assumption in Covington, Kentucky (1919)
