= Kaspar Stanggassinger =

German Roman Catholic priest

Blessed Kaspar Stanggassinger C.Ss.R.
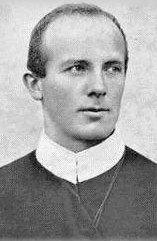

Priest
- Born: 12 January 1871; Berchtesgaden, Oberbayern, German Empire
- Died: 26 September 1899 (aged 28); Gars am Inn, Oberbayern, German Empire
- Venerated in: Roman Catholic Church
- Beatified: 24 April 1988, Saint Peter's Square, Vatican City by Pope John Paul II
- Feast: 26 September
- Attributes: Priest's habit

Kaspar Stanggassinger (12 January 1871 – 26 September 1899) was a German Roman Catholic priest and a professed member of the Redemptorists. His inclination to the priesthood manifested from his childhood and he soon became a seminarian before deciding not be a diocesan priest but part of a religious order after a spiritual experience directed him towards the Redemptorist charism. He was ordained to the priesthood in 1895 and soon began teaching and overseeing new seminarians despite his desire to go out to the missions in Brazil.

The beatification cause commenced in 1960 and he later became titled as Venerable upon the confirmation of his life of heroic virtue in 1986; he was later beatified not long after this in 1988.

== Life ==
Kaspar Stanggassinger was born in 1871 as the second of sixteen children to Kaspar Stanggassiner and Crescencia Hamberger. His father was a farmer who dabbled in stone since he owned one of the quarries close to their home and who was also a well-respected man in their town.

In his childhood the pious Stanggassinger announced that he would become a priest in due course when he grew older. He liked to gather other children and adolescents during periods of vacation and would go to Mass with them or hike or do other activities. On one occasion a friend was in danger of falling while mountain climbing but he risked his life to see him safe and sound. In 1887 he made a private vow to remain chaste and in 1889 contracted a serious illness but recovered and so consecrated himself to the Sacred Heart of Jesus Christ. He first attended a high school in Freising and completed his studies there on 7 January 1890 before beginning his studies for the priesthood on 22 November 1890 in the Archdiocese of Munich and Freising. But he struggled with his studies and so his father issued him with an ultimatum: finish his studies and buckle down or leave and find work someplace. He In 1890 he visited Vienna and Innsbruck and made other trips to places such as Munich and Salzburg. On 2 April 1892 he received the tonsure and the minor orders. That summer he went on pilgrimage to a Marian shrine in the nation's south and there experienced a strong urge to join the Redemptorists.

He entered the novitiate in the order at Gars Abbey in 1892 with the intention of preaching the Gospel to the most abandoned. On 16 October 1893 he made his vows and was later ordained to the priesthood on 16 June 1895 in Regensburg. He had hoped to be part of a mission band in Brazil but was sent instead to Dürrnburg to teach high school students. In addition to teaching he provided pastoral assistance at the churches in neighboring villages and preached for the most part. He was devoted to the Eucharist and in his preaching invited all to have recourse to the Blessed Sacrament in times of need and trouble. In 1899 the order opened a new institute for prospective seminarians in Gars and he was transferred there as its director on 22 September 1894. He had time to preach one retreat to the students and participate in its opening.

He fell ill with what was a fatal case of peritonitis and later died of it on 26 September 1899. He was buried in the Redemptorist convent at Gars am Inn; his remains were later relocated on 1 September 1935.

== Beatification ==
The beatification process opened in the Munich-Freising archdiocese under Cardinal Michael von Faulhaber who opened the informative process on 10 March 1937 and concluded it later on 24 March 1938. Theologians approved all of his spiritual writings on 24 July 1951 after having deemed them to be in strict accordance with the Catholic faith. The formal introduction of the cause came under Pope John XXIII on 27 April 1960 and he was therefore titled as a Servant of God. An apostolic process was later held and was opened on 8 May 1961 while Cardinal Julius Döpfner closed it on 14 February 1964. The Congregation for the Causes of Saints validated the previous processes in Rome on 16 January 1970 before later receiving the Positio from the postulation in 1985. Theologians assented to the cause on 9 July 1985 as did the C.C.S. on 8 January 1986 while the confirmation of his life of heroic virtue allowed for Pope John Paul II to title him as Venerable on 16 January 1986.

The miracle for his beatification was investigated and later validated prior to a medical board of experts approving it on 7 January 1987 with theologians to follow on 26 June 1987 and the C.C.S. as well on 20 October 1987. John Paul II issued final authorization needed for the miracle on 11 December 1987 and beatified Stanggassinger on 24 April 1988.

The current postulator for this cause is the Redemptorist priest Antonio Marrazzo.

== Quotations ==
Stanggassinger often said that: "The saints have a special intuition. For me, who am not a saint, what is important are the simple eternal truths: the Incarnation, the Redemption and the Holy Eucharist".

== Sources ==
- Butler's Lives of the Saints: September (26). Collegeville, MN: Liturgical Press, 2000.
- Weiss, Otto. To Do What the Day Demands: The Life of Father Kaspar Stanggassinger, Ligouri Publications ISBN 9780764820717
