= St. Alphonsus Liguori Church, Rome =

Church of Saint Alphonsus of Liguori
- Italian: Chiesa di Sant'Alfonso di Liguori all'Esquilino; Latin: S. Alfonsi in Exquiliis
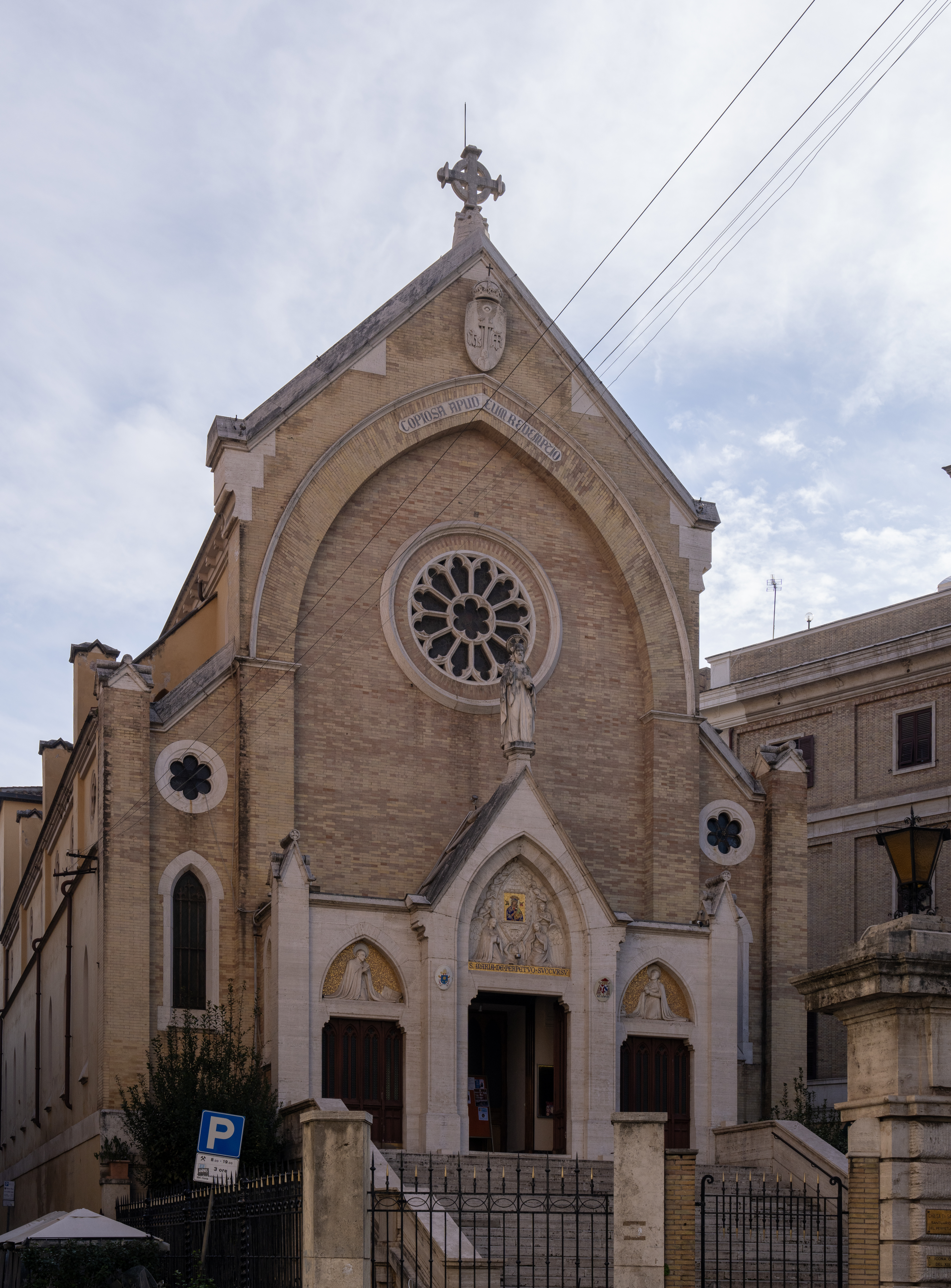
- Click on the map for a fullscreen view
- 41°53′45″N 12°30′01″E
- Location: Via Merulana 26; 00185 Rome
- Country: Italy
- Denomination: Roman Catholic
- Religious institute: Redemptorists
- Website: saintalphonsus.net

History
- Status: Titular church

Architecture
- Functional status: Active
- Architect: George J. Wigley
- Style: Gothic Revival
- Completed: 1859

Specifications
- Materials: Brick

The Church of Saint Alphonus of Liguori (Chiesa di Sant'Alfonso di Liguori all'Esquilino in Italian) is a rectory church located on the Via Merulana on the Esquiline Hill of central Rome's Vth prefecture, Italy, and a titular church for a Cardinal-priest under the name Santissimo Redentore e Sant'Alfonso in Via Merulana (Church of the Most Holy Redeemer and Saint Alphonse).

== Church ==
It is dedicated to St. Alphonsus Liguori, the founder of the Congregation of the Most Holy Redeemer (Redemptorists), who built and staff the church.

The church is one of the rare examples of neo-Gothic architecture in Rome. It is one of the last papal churches of Rome, although the Redemptorists have possession of the church and its related complex.

It was built between 1855 and 1859, designed by the Scottish architect George Wigley. The facade made of brick and travertine features three doors. In the central tympanum of the door there is a polychrome mosaic, depicting Our Lady of Perpetual Help. The facade is further embellished by a rose window.

The interior decorations, rich with marble, from the end of the nineteenth century, are by the Bavarian painter and Redemptorist Max Schmalzl (1850-1930). The apse is crowned by a mosaic, put in place in 1964, depicting the Redeemer enthroned between the Virgin Mary and Saint Joseph. Below the mosaic hangs the original icon of Our Lady of Perpetual Help, which was produced in Crete in the 14th century. This icon was claimed to have been stolen from Keras Kardiotissas Monastery in 1498 and given to the Redemptorists by Pope Pius IX in 1866. The shrine received a papal visit from Pope John Paul II on 30 June 1991.

== Cardinal-protectors ==
Saint John XXIII named St. Alphonsus a Cardinal Titular Church on 30 December 1960 as SS. Redentore e S. Alfonso in Via Merulana (Most Holy Redeemer and St. Alphonsus on Via Merulana). The following cardinals have served as Cardinal priests:

- (United States) Joseph Elmer Ritter, (1961.01.19 – 1967.06.10), while Metropolitan Archbishop of Saint Louis (1946.07.20 – 1967.06.10)
- (Germany) José Clemente Maurer, C.Ss.R. (1967.06.29 – 1990.06.27), while Metropolitan Archbishop of Sucre (Bolivia) (1951.10.27 – 1983.11.30), President of Episcopal Conference of Bolivia (1968 – 1979)
- (United States) Anthony Joseph Bevilacqua, (1991.06.28 – 2012.01.31), while Metropolitan Archbishop of Philadelphia (USA) (1988.02.11 – 2003.07.15)
- (United Kingdom) Vincent Nichols, (2014.02.22 – ...), while Metropolitan Archbishop of Westminster (London, England, UK) (2009.04.03 – ...), President of Bishops' Conference of England and Wales (2009.04.30 – ...)

== Gallery ==
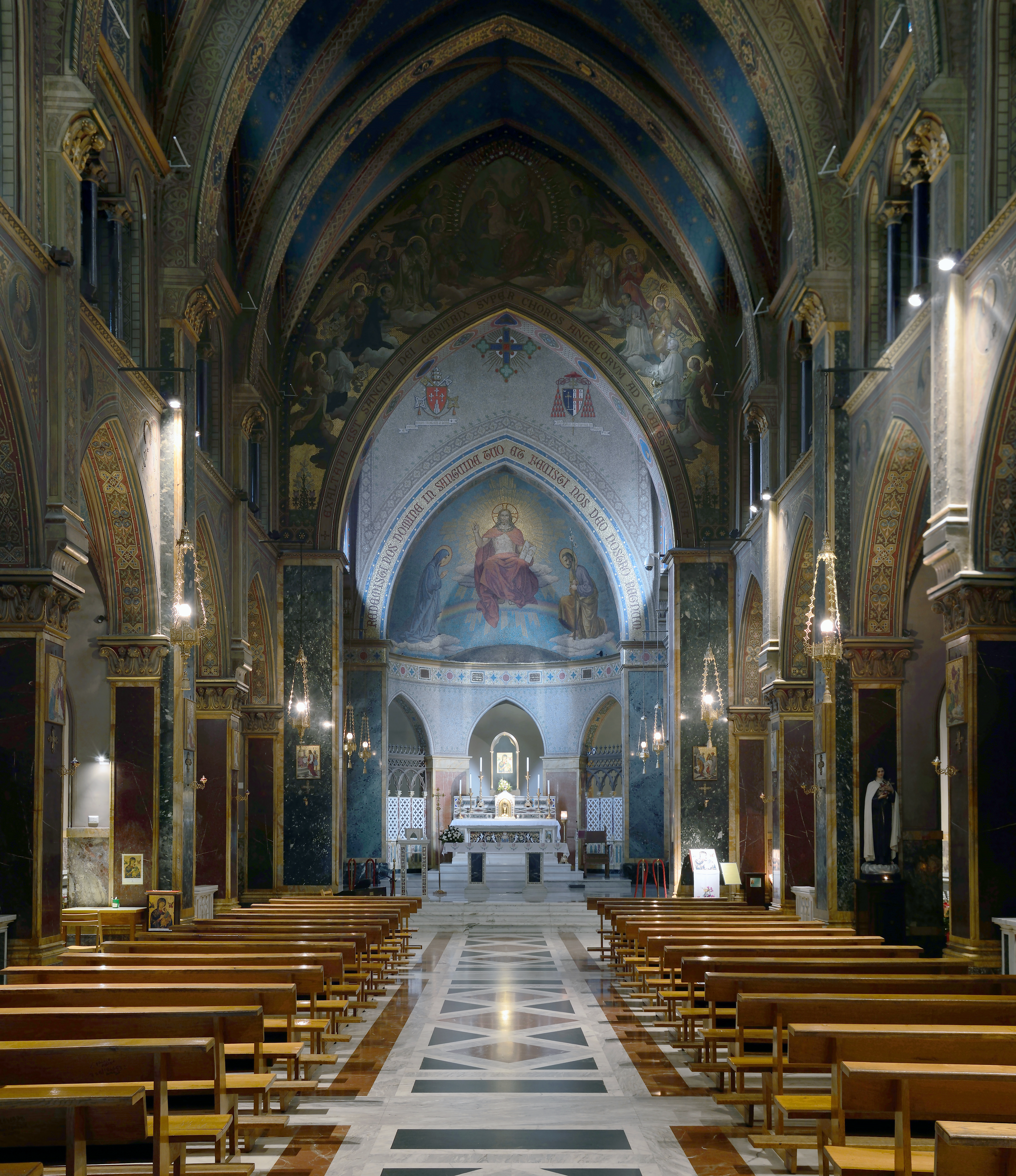
Central view

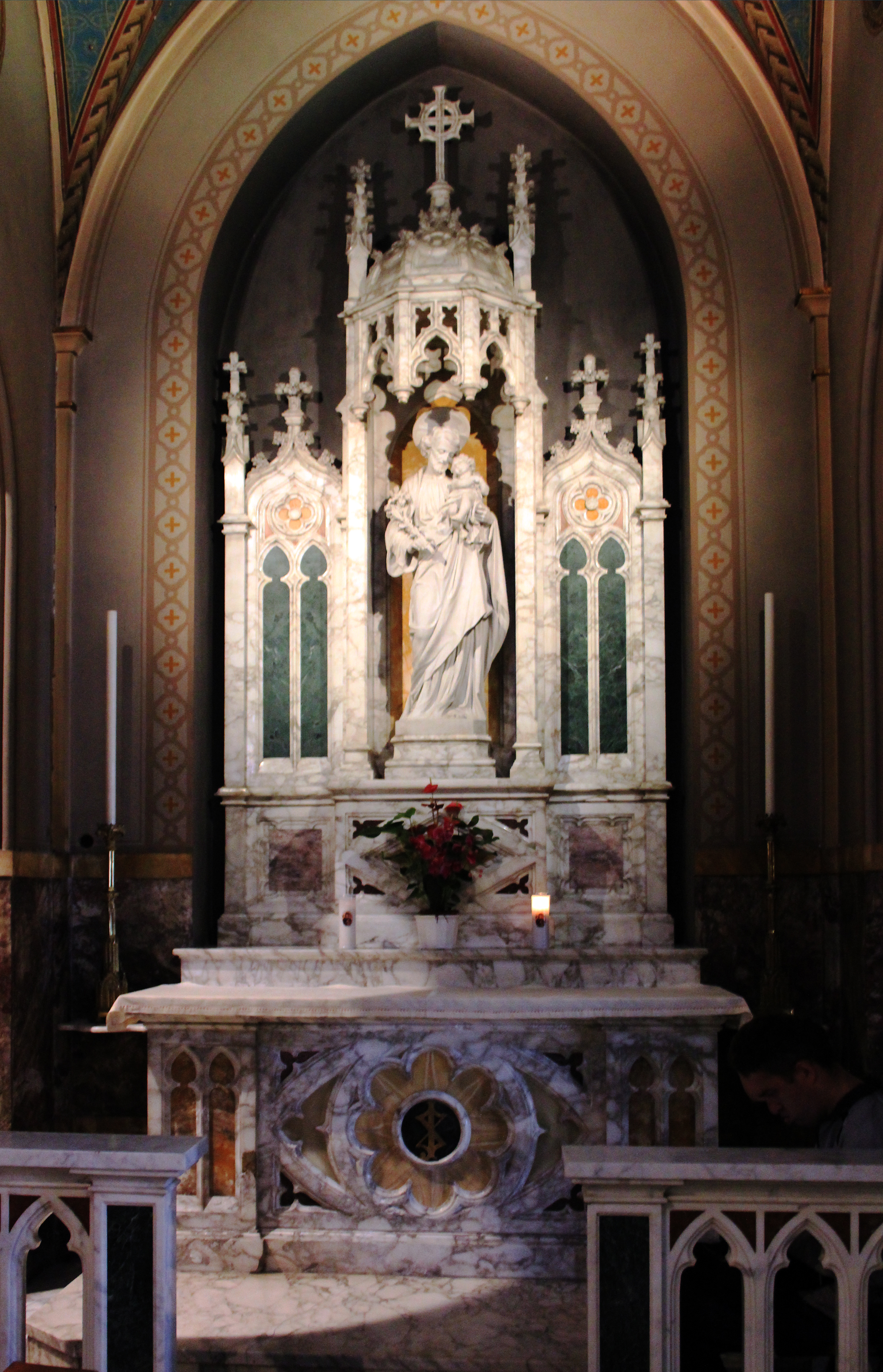
Chapel

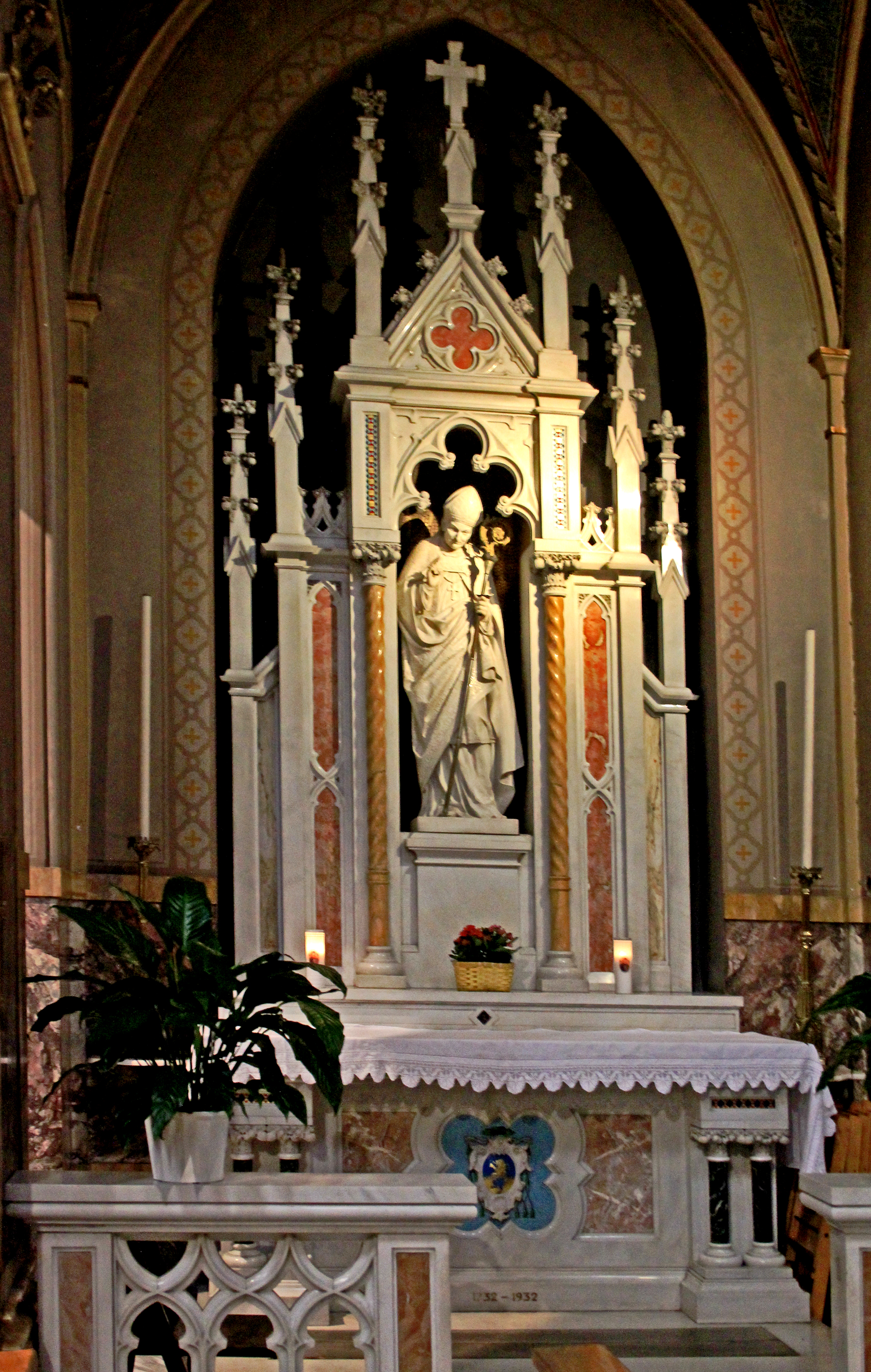
Chapel

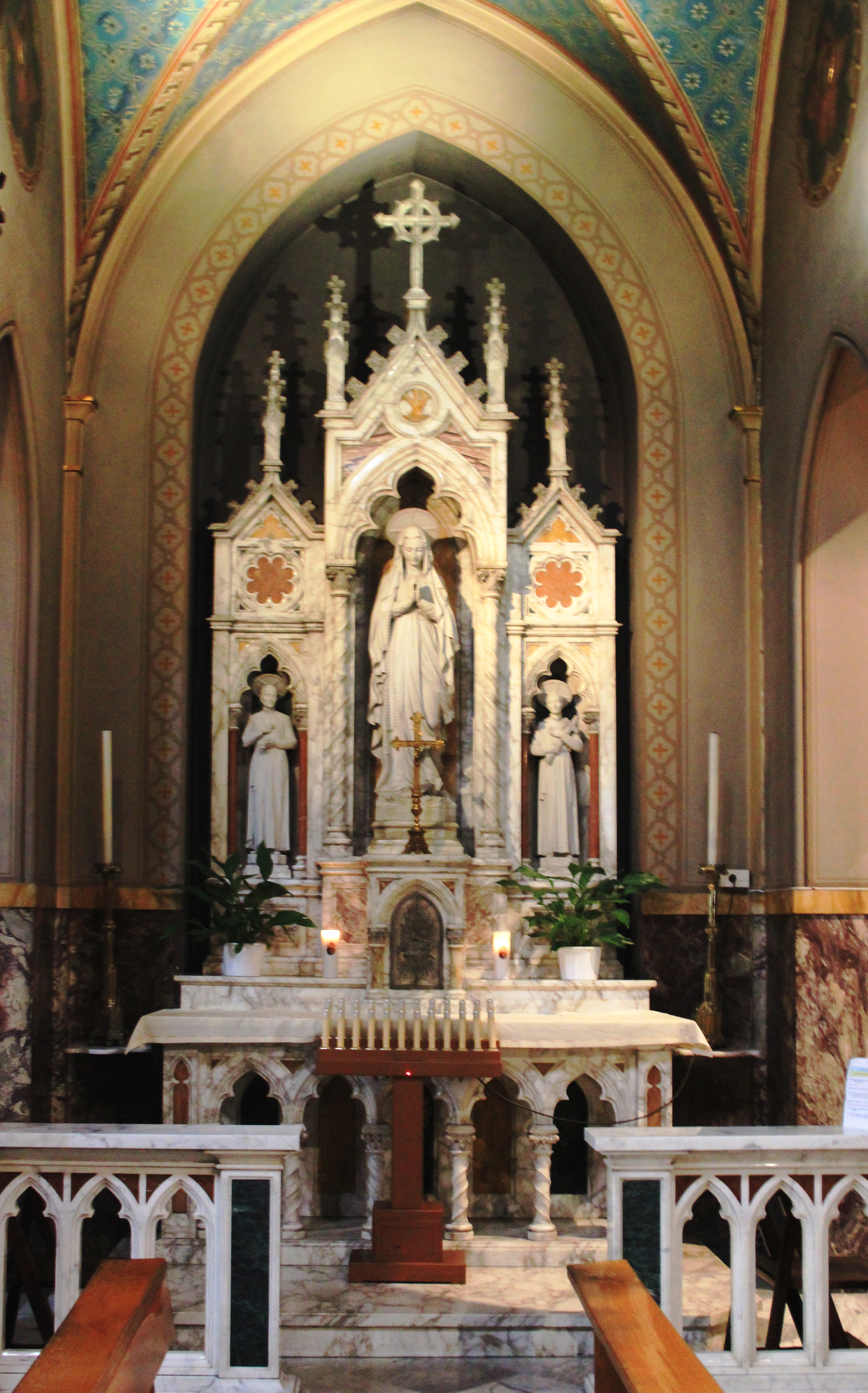
Chapel

== Sources and external links ==
- Official Website (in English, Spanish, Italian, French, and German)
- GCatholic cardinal title
- GCatholic church
