= Alfred Pampalon =

Canadian Redemptorist priest

Venerable Alfred Pampalon CSsR
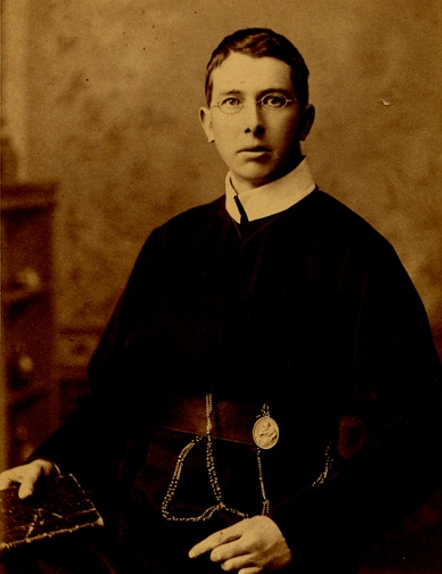
- Pampalon, c. 1890
- Born: 24 November 1867; Lévis, Quebec, Canada
- Died: 30 September 1896 (aged 28); Sainte-Anne-de-Beaupré, Quebec, Canada

Alfred Pampalon CSsR (24 November 1867 – 30 September 1896) was a Canadian Redemptorist priest known for having a deep faith in God and a deep love of Mary. His beatification process was opened in 1920.

== Early life ==
Alfred Pampalon was born 24 November 1867 in Lévis, Quebec, the ninth of twelve children born to Antoine and Josephine Dorion Pampalon. His father was a stonemason, who worked building churches. His mother died when he was five and his father remarried. Alfred was tutored at home until he age of nine. In 1876 Pampalon entered the Collège de Lévis in 1876 where he took courses in business. Somewhat frail, he was an average student. He was considered a modest, prayerful person; he was thought of as honest and pure by his classmates. Pampalon was devoted to Mary.

Pampalon experienced a near fatal bout of pneumonia in 1885, and attributed his recovery to the intercession of St. Anne. He made a pilgrimage, walking the twenty-one miles to the shrine of Sainte-Anne-de-Beaupré and while there asked to join the Congregation of the Most Holy Redeemer. His brother was already a member. In July 1886 he sailed for the Redemptorist novitiate in Sint-Truiden, Belgium. He was sent to the major seminary of Saint-Jean-de-Beauplateau for two years of philosophy and four years of theology. During his years of formation and study, his classmates dubbed him "the Lamb of God," a testimony to his piety and gentleness. His fellow students asked him how he managed to study philosophy so well, and he replied that he imagined Mary was asking him the questions.

== Later years and death ==
Pampalon was ordained 4 October 1892. He began his ministry in Mons, a mining area in Belgium. He carried out various duties, replacing absent priests or on occasion accompanying those who went to preach in neighboring parishes. Pampalon suffered from a slight speech impediment, and while not an exceptional preacher, was nonetheless an effective one. He suffered from tuberculosis from the age of fourteen. Never in robust health, it was decided that he be transferred to Saint-Jean-de-Beauplateau. He was then sent back to Quebec in the hope that the change might improve his health. His father and two sisters had died during his nine years abroad.

He returned in September 1895 and was assigned to Sainte-Anne-de-Beaupré, where he was able to carry out simple duties, preaching in the basilica and hearing confession. He entered the infirmary the following February. Before his death he was in constant pain, unable to alleviate it, and would spend his days in prayer. The night before Pampalon died, he said in a soft voice; "O death..., O holy death..., come..., do come! O divine Savior..., my hope is in your merits... I am happy... to suffer for you! I want to go to Heaven... to see you and Mary," After this he got up and sang the Magnificat in a loud voice. He has become known as the "Hail Mary Saint" because of this.

Pampalon died at Sainte-Anne-de-Beaupré on 30 September 1896.

== Beatification process ==
The beatification process for Pampalon was opened on 28 April 1920, and he was declared a Servant of God. Pampalon was declared venerable by Pope John Paul II on May 14, 1991.

== Quotations ==
"Que la volonté de Dieu soit faite!" in English: "That the will of God be done!" is inscribed on the tomb of Alfred Pampalon, which is located in the Basilica of Sainte-Anne-de-Beaupré, Quebec City.
