= George J. Wigley =

English journalist and Roman Catholic activist

George Jonas Wigley (born Scotland 1825 - died 20 January 1866, Rome, Italy) was a British architect, journalist and supporter of Catholic causes.

== Life ==
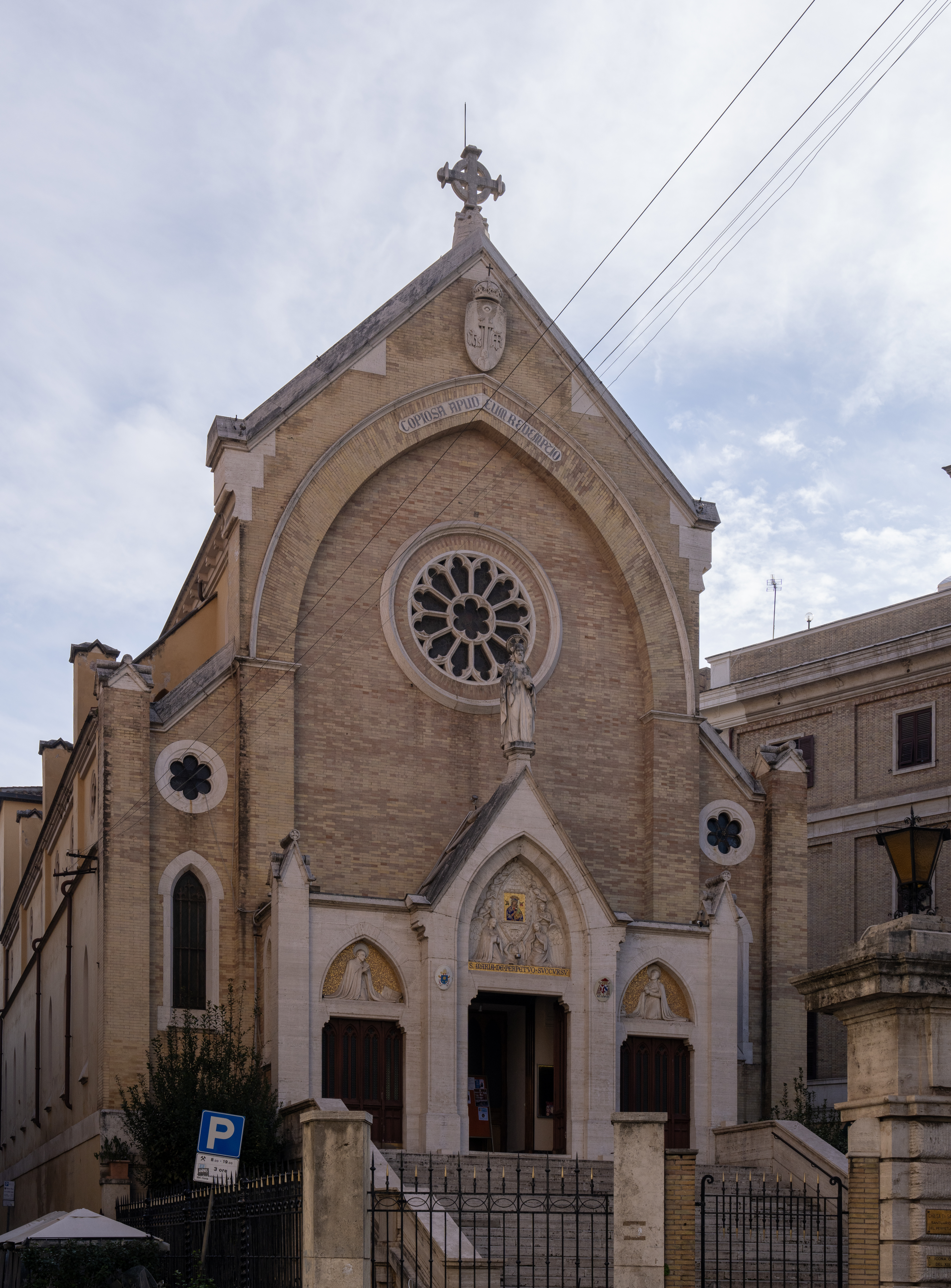
Church of the Redeeemer and St. Alphonsus Liguori; Rome

By profession he was an architect, but subsequently devoted himself to journalism in Paris. He was one of the band of laymen who surrounded Frederick Ozanam and who founded with him the Society of St. Vincent de Paul. At Ozanam's suggestion, he wrote some letters to The Tablet describing the aims and the work of the new Society. Frederick Lucas, editor of The Tablet, then wrote some articles on the same subject and in January, 1844, the English branch was formed, with Wigley, who was by then living in London, becoming one of the original thirteen members.

He designed the Redeemer and St. Alphonsus Liguori titular church, Esquiline, Rome, which was built in 1855-59. The only church he built in England was St Mary's Church in Woolhampton in 1848.

In or about 1860 Wigley took a leading part in forming both in England and in France the Peterspence Association for assisting the Pope. Shortly after, Pius IX bestowed on him the Cross of St. Gregory the Great. He met his death in attending one of the St. Vincent de Paul cases in Rome, a Protestant English sailor. Wigley nursed him, and had him received into the Catholic Church on his death-bed. Then falling ill himself, he went to the hospital of the Brothers of St. John of God, where he died on 20 January 1866.

== Sources ==
- ; entry cites:
  - Archibald Dunn, The Society S.V.P.; recollections of its early days in London (1907)
  - William Joseph Amherst, The Formation of the Society of S.V.P. (London, 1899)
