= Keras Kardiotissas Monastery =

Greek Orthodox monastery in Crete

- Μονή Κεράς Καρδιώτισσας
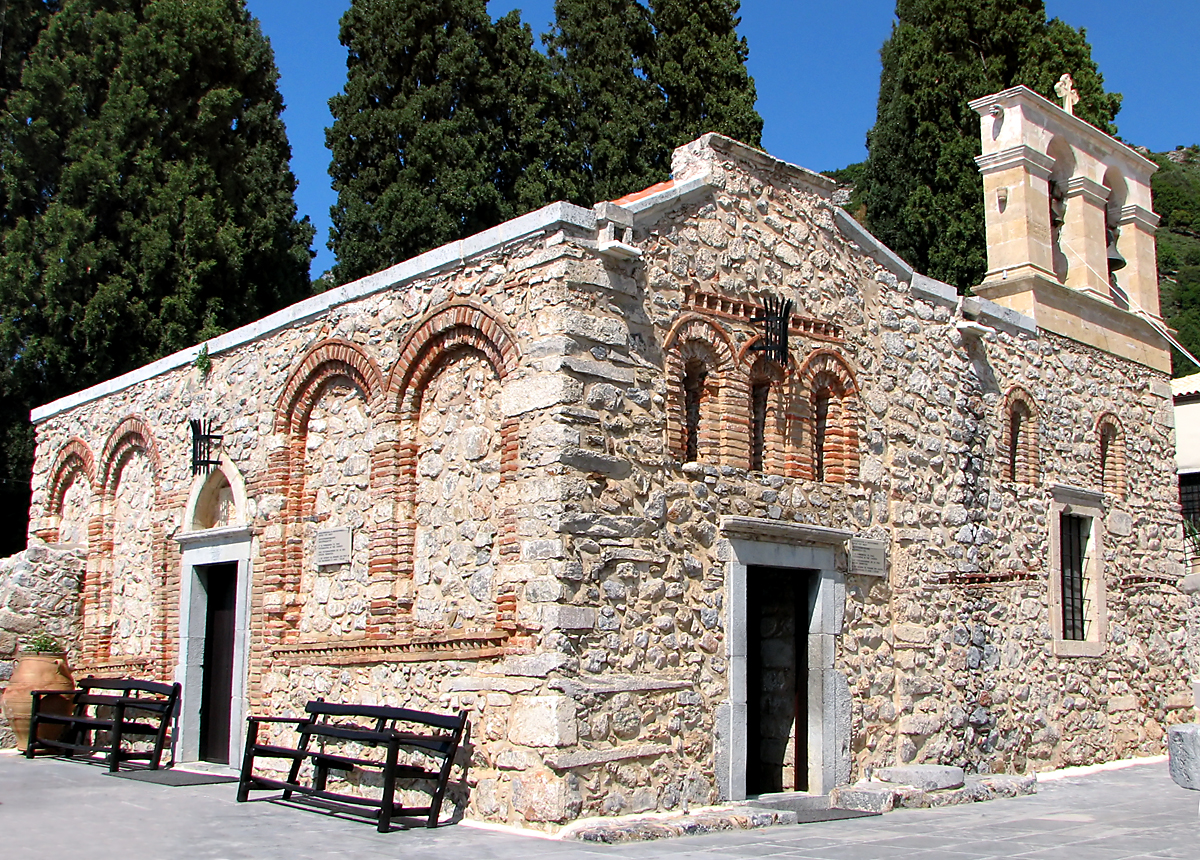
- The katholikon of the monastery

- Location of the monastery in Crete
- Interactive map of Keras Kardiotissas Monastery

Monastery information
- Full name: Monastery of Agios Ioannis Kapsas
- Order: Ecumenical Patriarchate of Constantinople
- Denomination: Greek Orthodox
- Dedication: Virgin Mary
- Celebration: September 8: Birth of Mary
- Archdiocese: Church of Crete

Architecture
- Status: Monastery; Nunnery
- Functional status: Active
- Style: Byzantine
- Completion date: c. early-14th century

Site
- Location: Kera, Heraklion, Crete
- Country: Greece
- Coordinates: 35°13′28″N 25°27′41″E

The Keras Kardiotissas Monastery (Greek: Μονή Κεράς Καρδιώτισσας, romanized: Moni Keras Kardiotissas), or simply the Keras Monastery (Μονή Κεράς) and officially as the Monastery of Agios Ioannis Kapsas, is a Greek Orthodox monastery that is situated near the village of Kera of the Heraklion region in Crete, Greece. Dedicated to the Virgin Mary, the monastery was built on the north slopes of Mt. Dikti, at a 650 metres (2,130 ft) above sea level and is approximately 50 kilometres (31 mi) east of the city of Heraklion, next to the road to Lasithi Plateau.

== History ==
The exact date of the monastery's establishment is unknown. However, references to it are made in manuscripts dating from the early fourteenth century; most likely, 1333. The monastery was named after an old icon of Theotokos that according to tradition was miraculous. That icon was transferred to Rome by a wine merchant in 1498, where it is now permanently enshrined in the Church of St. Alphonsus near the Esquiline Hill. The stolen icon was replaced by another one in 1735 that is also regarded as miraculous.

=== Icon ===
The first mention of the monastery dates from 1333 and is linked to the icon of the All-Holy Virgin the Kardiotissa. According to tradition, the icon was painted by St. Lazaros, a monk and icon painter who lived during the period of Iconoclasm. The icon was stolen during Venetian occupation and was transferred to the church of St. Alphonse in Rome, while the newer icon that replaced it since 1735 is considered equally miraculous.

During the Ottoman occupation of Crete, the monastery often served as a local revolutionary center and suffered several retaliatory attacks as a result. In 1720, The Keras Monastery became stauropegic (independent of the local Bishop).

The monastery functions as a nunnery. The birth of Mary is celebrated on September 8.

== Architecture ==
The Byzantine-style monastery is surrounded by fortified walls. The main church (katholikon) was originally built as an arch-covered single space structure and was later expanded with two narthexes and a smaller chapel. The church features murals dating to the 14th and 15th centuries. The icon is on the left of the iconostasis next to the chains (you will see the devout wrap themselves in these chains and kiss the icon); the marble pillar is outside. There is also a small religion museum.

Of the original monastery, only the katholikon survives, that has been structured architecturally after successive interventions to the original single-nave church. The barrel-vaulted space to the north and the three parallel to each other spaces on the west side were added subsequently. The whole was united with the addition of the large transverse narthex. The sides of the narthex are of particular interest as they are structured according to the Byzantine model, with blind brick arcades and ceramo-plastic decoration.

== See also ==
- Church of Crete
- List of Greek Orthodox monasteries in Greece
- List of museums in Greece
