= Domenico Blasucci =

Italian religious man (1732–1752)

Domenico Blasucci (5 March 1732 – 2 November 1752) was an Italian religious man.

== Biography ==
Biasucci was born as the son of Nicola, who died just three years after his birth, and Maria Antonia Carnevale. He has 3 brothers and 6 sisters. His religious vocation occurred in many periods: in 1747 during the preaching of a minor conventual father, and in 1748, after a mission of the Vincentians in his country. The following year he learned of a missionary congregation founded in 1932 by the priest Alfonso Maria de' Liguori and approved by the Pope in the same year. After having asked with supplications to be welcomed among the Redemptorists, he was received on 24 December 1749 as a novice in the house of Ciorani. On 2 February 1750 he wore his religious habit for the first time. Already educated in adolescence by an uncle who was an archpriest, in 1751 he began to study theology in Pagani. He later met his brother Gerardo Maiella in Deliceto, with whom he became a close friend. after having freed him, in a way considered miraculous, from his anguish. Having fallen ill with tuberculosis, after almost two years he died on 2 November 1752 in Materdomini, a hamlet of Caposele. His body remained in the church for another two days after the funeral, and was then buried in a rock where the Madonna della Potenza is. On 26 November of the following year another ceremony took place in the religious house of Pagani and, in the funeral eulogy, he was presented as the model and soul of the Institute.

== Historical importance ==
Since 1812, contemporary testimonies on the life of the religious man have been published, edited by the Redemptorists Giuseppe Landi and Antonio Maria Tannoja.

Because of his heroic virtues, the example of the young Domenico was an impulse, together with that of other confreres such as Gerardo Maiella, Cesare Sportelli and Paolo Cafaro and of Sister Maria Celeste Crostarosa, to vocations in the period in which Alfonso Maria de' Liguori was still alive. In particular, both Maiella and Blasucci, despite Liguori recommending not to abuse the body in penance, practiced asceticism in such a way as to impress the rural and pastoral culture of the South. The same elder brother Pietro Paolo entered the congregation shortly before Domenico's death, becoming superior general years later.

The beatification process was started in 1893, with the cause introduced in 1907, after Pope Pius X proclaimed him "venerable" on 23 May 1906. On 12 December 1922 the validity of the beatification and canonization process was confirmed. Since 5 January 2003 the venerable's body has been located in the left nave of the Sanctuary of San Gerardo Maiella.

== Iconography ==
The religious man is portrayed in works exhibited in numerous places in Europe: Ruvo del Monte, Materdomini (Caposele) (Sanctuary of San Gerardo Maiella ), Pagani (Basilica of Sant'Alfonso), Naples (Tarsia area), Torre del Greco, Francavilla Fontana, Rome (Church of Sant'Alfonso all'Esquilino and General House of the Congregation), Cortona, Bruges, Roeselare and Muro Lucano (Co-Cathedral of San Nicola).

== Memory ==
In Ruvo Del Monte have been named after Domenico Blasucci:

In the parish area:

- the meeting room of the Catholic Action Parish, with a metal plaque
- the A.N.S.P.I.–National Association of San Paolo Italy– Parish
- an exhibition space in the Parish Museum of Sacred Art, Rural Civilization and Historical Memory of Ruvese
- the Parish Youth Community Center
- the Parish Choir
- the Parish Altar Servers Group
- in Memory of the Venerable, the traditional 5-a-side football tournament "San Rocco and San Donato Martire"
- the final evening of the IV edition of the Summer Camp for Catholic Action Kids

In the civil sphere, the Municipal Administration has created the dedication or the memory of the Venerable as follows:

- the street where his birthplace is located in the historic city center, upon petition of the Parish Catholic Action
- a commemorative stone epigraph on the external wall of his birthplace
- has inserted, among the information in transition on the large luminous screen, the website www.domenicoblasuci.it in the "sites of community interest" and a link to the same site in the institutional one of the Municipality
- a commemorative ceramic plaque on the external wall of the nursing home for the elderly "Dott. Tommaso Patrissi"
- an exhibition space in the Multiplex of Memory
- a metal road sign placed at the three main entrances to the city center, with the words "Native town of the Venerable Domenico Blasucci (Redentorista)"

In the Notiziario Ruvese, a bimonthly periodical of the Municipality, several articles have been published on the Venerable.

The biographical notes of the Venerable Domenico Blasucci and his older brother Pietro Paolo have been reported in the Redemptorist Dictionary written by Father Samuel Joseph Boland, an Australian Redemptorist. The volume consists of 440 pages and was printed by Tipografia Editrice M. Pisani S.a.s. – Isola del Liri in the province of Frosinone. It was published in English by the Istituto Storico Redentorista on the occasion of the bicentenary of the birth in Heaven of Saint Alfonso Maria De Liguori, 1787 – 1 August – 1987.

In the house of the Redemptorist Missionaries of Agrigento, the Corridor on the upper floor of the religious structure is named after the Venerable.

=== Worship ===
The Venerable is remembered in the following Holy Masses: February 2, the day of the wearing of the religious habit and of the religious profession; 5 March, the day of his birth; 6 March, the day of his Baptism; 1 November, the eve of his death; 2 November, the day of the Dies Natalis.

Since 2003, generally on the third Sunday of the month of October, the mortal remains of the Venerable are venerated, prayers are said for his glorification and his hymn is sung around the monumental tomb, located in the Basilica of San Gerardo Maiella in Materdomini di Caposele, in the province of Avellino, during the annual afternoon pilgrimage that the parish community of Ruvo del Monte makes in honor of the miracle-working Saint, co-patron of Basilicata, venerated and invoked celestial patron of mothers and children, fraternal friend of our beloved Venerable Domenico Blasucci.

Since 2005, a devout remembrance of the Venerable has been held in the homily for the Parish Feast of San Gerardo Maiella, usually in the month of September, during the Eucharistic Celebration at 11:00.

On 13 June 2005, a citywide prayer vigil was held in the Parish Church of Santa Maria Assunta in honor of the Venerable Domenico Basucci on the occasion of the "Peregrinatio gerardina", held to commemorate the 250th anniversary of the death of San Gerardo Maiella, a close friend of the young Professed Student Blasucci. The fathers of the Congregation of the Most Holy Redeemer were present at the evening with the relics of San Gerardo Maiella.

During the first pastoral visit of Monsignor Gianfranco Todisco, Bishop of the Diocese of Melfi–Rapolla–Venosa, on 23 May 2008 (the day of his proclamation as Venerable), a long and well-attended Solemn Prayer Vigil was held in honor of the Venerable.

The parish priest, Don Gerardo Gugliotta, on the 1st Centenary of the proclamation of the young Domenico Blasucci as Venerable, published a picture of the Venerable and a new biography: Venerable Domenico Blasucci, Redemptorist, native of Ruvo del Monte, from the Lucanian land on the paths of sanctity, Materdomini (AV), Valsele Tipografica srl, July 2006.

On 23 May, the day of his proclamation as Venerable, a Solemn Mass is celebrated, preceded by a Triduum of prayers and reflections on 20, 21 and 22 May, which has been held since 2011;

Every third Sunday of the month, since 2011, the Monthly Day of Prayers and Reflections in Memory of the Venerable is celebrated, with Eucharistic Adoration, the Holy Rosary, the Litany of Loreto, Vespers, the reading of his Spiritual Thoughts, the Prayer for glorification, the Eucharistic Blessing and the singing of the Hymn (currently there are two and they alternate from Sunday to Sunday).

On the evening of 1 November, the Solemnity of All Saints and the Eve of the pious passing and birth into heaven of the venerable Domenico Blasucci, a votive light is placed at the windows of the houses to remember the venerated death of the young Saint, to show devotion and to implore his protection, praising and thanking the Lord for the gift of the Venerable and praying to Him to grant His faithful servant glorification.

Over the centuries, several hymns have been dedicated to the Venerable, including in French and Dutch, used in religious houses across the Alps on the day in which his death is commemorated. In recent times, it was written on the occasion of the 100th anniversary of the proclamation of Venerability of the young Redemptorist (1906 – 23 May – 2006) by Don Pasquale Di Fronzo, a priest of the Diocese of Avellino; the score was written by Maestro Dino Rigillo of Ginestra (PZ); this hymn was recorded in amateur form by the Parish Choir, dedicated to the Venerable. The second hymn to the Venerable Essere Santi was written and set to music by Father Antonio Mario Leva, a religious priest of the Community of Hermits of Cerreto in Venosa, a biblical scholar, musician, director of the Diocesan Choir of Melfi–Rapolla–Venosa and head of the Diocesan Commission of Sacred Music.

The Catholic Action Parish of Ruvo del Monte has produced a single issue newspaper in the printing press with the involvement of the Diocesan Bishop, five editions of a wall calendar, images, bookmarks, postcards and leaflets, as well as printed information sheets.

The Italian Catholic Action of the Diocese of Melfi–Rapolla–Venosa, the birthplace of the venerable Domenico Blasucci, during the association year 2011/2012, rediscovered and prayed with the entire diocesan Church for the young Redemptorist Saint Blasucci. The official announcement was made on December 8, 2011, on the Solemnity of the Immaculate Conception of the Blessed Virgin Mary and the Feast of Adhesion to the A.C.I., by Remigio Strazzo of Melfi, diocesan president, with a letter

== Bibliography ==
- Giuseppe Galasso, The Other Europe, Guide, 2009, p. 116.
- Gabriele De Rosa, Religious Time and Historical Time, Ed. di Storia e Letteratura, 1987, pp. 348–350.
- Claudio Benedetti, Positions and articles for the ordinary processes on the reputation of sanctity, virtues and miracles of the servant of God Domenico Blasucci, professed student of the Congregation of the Most Holy Redeemer, Rome, 1893.
- Michele Donato Grieco, Friendship in Sacred Scripture and the relationship between the Venerable Domenico Blasucci and Saint Gerard Maiella (PDF), on strada-facendo.it
