= Gars am Inn =

Gars a.Inn
- Municipality
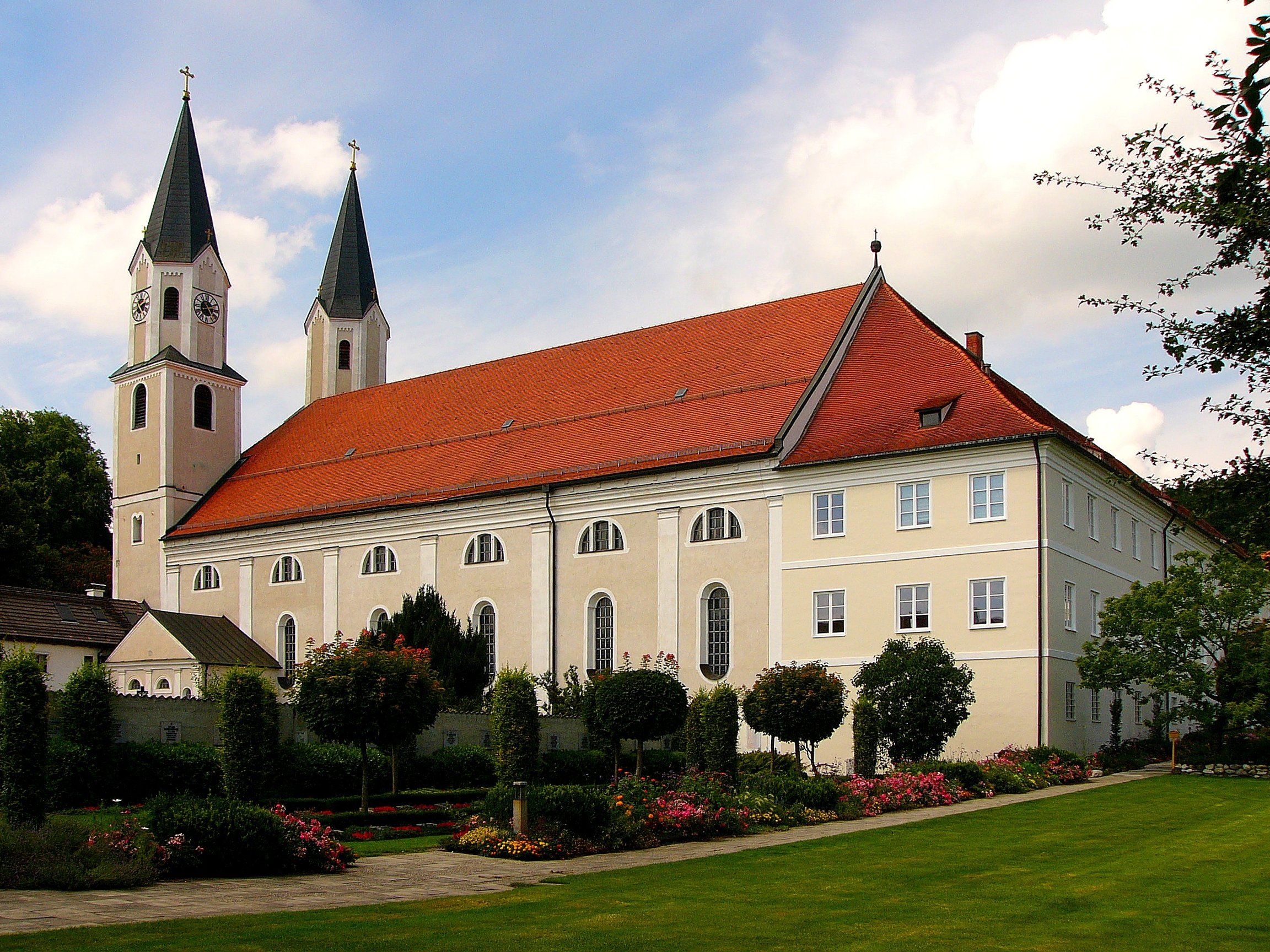
- Church of the Assumption of the Virgin Mary at the Gars Abbey

- Coat of arms

- Location of Gars a.Inn within Mühldorf am Inn district
- Interactive map of Gars a.Inn
- Location within Germany Location within Bavaria
- Coordinates: 48°9′N 12°17′E
- Country: Germany
- State: Bavaria
- Admin. region: Oberbayern
- District: Mühldorf am Inn
- Municipal assoc.: Gars am Inn
- Subdivisions: 6

Government
  - Mayor (2020–26): Robert Otter

Area
  - Total: 4.366 km^{2} (1.686 sq mi)
- Elevation: 404–598 m (1,325–1,962 ft)

Population (2025-12-31)
  - Total: 4,026
  - Density: 922.1/km^{2} (2,388/sq mi)
- Time zone: UTC+01:00 (CET)
  - Summer (DST): UTC+02:00 (CEST)
- Postal codes: 83536, 83546, 83555
- Dialling codes: 08073
- Vehicle registration: MÜ
- Website: www.gars.de

Gars is a municipality in the district of Mühldorf in Bavaria in Germany. It is the location of Gars Abbey.

== International relations ==
Gars am Inn is twinned with the following city:

- Gars am Kamp, Niederösterreich, Austria
