= Redemptorists =

Catholic missionary order

Congregation of the Most Holy Redeemer
- Congregatio Sanctissimi Redemptoris
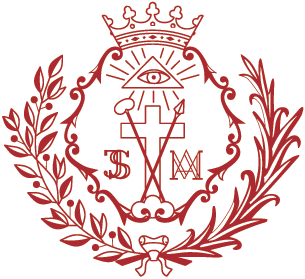
- Abbreviation: CSsR
- Formation: November 9, 1732; 293 years ago
- Founder: Alphonsus Liguori
- Founded at: Scala, Italy
- Type: Clerical religious congregation of pontifical right for men
- Headquarters: Via Merulana 31, Rome, Italy
- Members: 4,440 members (includes 3,358 priests) as of October 2026
- Superior general: Fr. Rogério Gomes, CSsR
- Patroness: Our Lady of the Immaculate Conception
- Website: cssr.news

The Redemptorists, officially named the Congregation of the Most Holy Redeemer (Latin: Congregatio Sanctissimi Redemptoris), abbreviated CSsR, is a Catholic clerical religious congregation of pontifical rite for men (priests and brothers). It was founded by Alphonsus Liguori at Scala, Italy, for the purpose of labouring among the neglected country people around Naples. It is dedicated to missionary work, ministering in more than 100 countries. Members of the congregation are Catholic priests and consecrated religious brothers.

The Redemptorists are especially dedicated to Our Lady of Perpetual Help and were appointed by Pope Pius IX in 1865 as both custodians and missionaries of the icon of that title, which is enshrined at the Redemptorist Church of St. Alphonsus Liguori in Rome. Many Redemptorist churches are dedicated to her under that title.

However, the Patroness of the Congregation is the Blessed Virgin Mary under the title "Immaculate Conception", of which St. Alphonsus was a strong propagator even before Marian Dogma was officially promulgated.

== Foundation and development ==
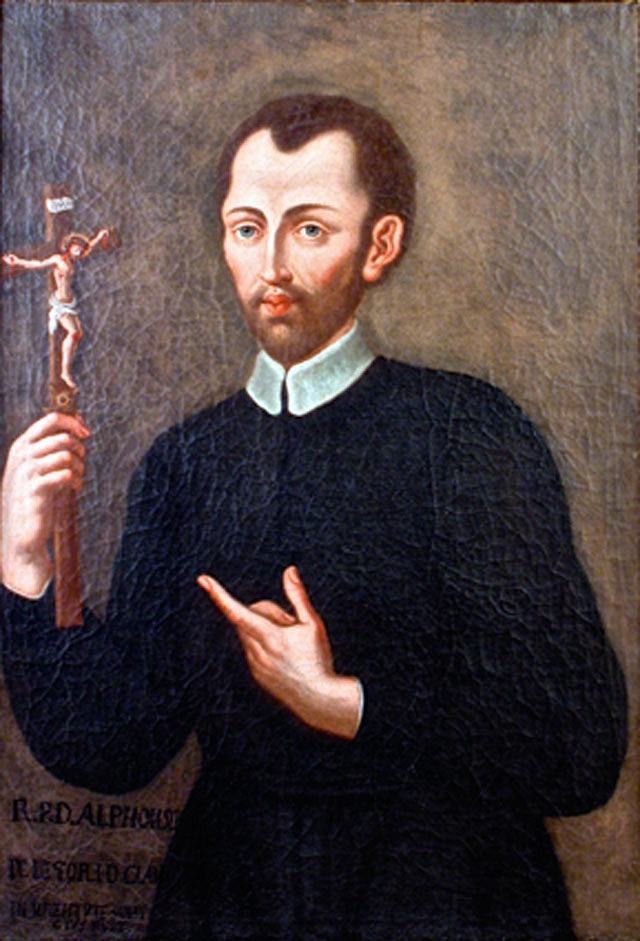
Alphonsus Liguori (1696–1787)

Alphonsus Liguori was deeply moved by the plight of the poor living in Naples and the surrounding area. In 1732 he established his community with the aim of providing spiritual nourishment. Amongst his companions was Gerard Majella. In 1748 Alphonsus petitioned Pope Benedict XIV, to allow him to establish a congregation to minister to the poor in the area around Naples. Benedict agreed and the congregation was formed on November 9, 1749.

Within ten years of its foundation, communities had been established at Nocera, Ciorani, Iliceto, and Caposele. Due to political complications, there was an initial difficulty with the houses in the Papal States being separated from those in the Kingdom of Naples, but this was overcome in 1793 and the congregation soon opened houses in Sicily and other parts of southern Italy.

The congregation was soon to move beyond the borders of present-day Italy. In 1785, two Austrians, Clemens Maria Hofbauer and Thaddeus Hübl, joined the Redemptorists. In 1786 Hofbauer and Hübl went to Warsaw, Poland where the papal nuncio gave them responsibility for the parish of Saint Benno in the New Town; their mission thrived until the community was expelled in 1808. In 1793, Hofbauer turned his sights on establishing communities in Germanic lands. Soon houses were opened in the south at Jestetten, Triberg im Schwarzwald, and Babenhausen. In 1818, a house was established in Switzerland at the abandoned Carthusian monastery in La Valsainte.

=== 19th century ===
In 1826, at the request of the government of Austria, the Redemptorists established a community in Lisbon, Portugal, with the purpose of ministering to German speaking Catholics. Other houses quickly followed in German-speaking areas: Mautern an der Donau (1827), Innsbruck (1828), Marburg (1833), Eggenburg (1833), and Leoben (1834).

The congregation also rapidly expanded into Belgium with communities at Tournai (1831), Sint-Truiden (1833), Liège (1833), and Brussels (1849). A community was even established in the Netherlands, at the time somewhat anti-Catholic, when a house was opened in Wittem in 1836. The revolutions of 1848 which swept over Europe caused much upheaval, and the Redemptorists were expelled from Switzerland and Austria and were at risk elsewhere.

The congregation thrived throughout the remainder of the 19th century; in 1852 there were four provinces, and by 1890 this had increased to twelve with communities having been established in Chile, Colombia, Ecuador, England, Scotland, Spain, and Suriname. The 20th century saw the continuation of expansion to where the congregation created new provinces, vice provinces, and missions in every decade, and established a network of lay associates and volunteers who work with the Redemptorists to bring the Gospel to the poor.

== Apostolate ==
Redemptorists are essentially a missionary society although their ministry is not confined to developing nations. According to their rule they are "to strive to imitate the virtues and examples of Jesus Christ, our Redeemer consecrating themselves especially to the preaching of the word of God to the poor". Their labors consist principally in missions, retreats, and similar exercises. In 2019, there were approximately 5,500 Redemptorists in 82 countries throughout the world.

=== Preaching and parochial missions ===
Alphonsus Liguori wanted his companions to be itinerant preachers of the Word of God. Traditionally, this has been the mainstay of the Redemptorists as they are well known for conducting parochial missions. The purpose of these parochial missions and the homilies preached by the Redemptorists is to "... invite people to a deeper love for God and a fuller practice of the Christian life." In accordance with the instructions of Liguori, preaching is to be down-to-earth and understandable to all who are listening.

=== Shrines, sanctuaries and retreat houses ===
In order to advance their mission and provide places of pilgrimage, the Redemptorists administer several shrines, which draw hundreds of thousands of people, the best-known being in Brazil, Canada, Colombia, the Philippines, Rome, and Singapore. The congregation operates many retreat houses where people of all walks of life, Catholic or otherwise, can spend some time in reflection, either individually or in a group.

Redemptorists are caretakers of the Byzantine icon of Our Mother of Perpetual Help, depicting the Virgin Mary with the Child Jesus and the instruments of the Passion. The icon was entrusted to them by Pope Pius IX. It is now enshrined in the Redemptorist Church of St. Alphonsus Liguori, Rome, and Redemptorists propagate devotion to Mary under this title.

=== Other ministry ===
As with most religious congregations, the Redemptorists are also involved in other forms of ministry such as parishes, education, youth and social communication. In recent years the congregation has increasingly become concerned with matters of social justice; as the Generalate website states "Redemptorists believe that the saving love of God touches the whole person and calls for the transformation of social injustice into respect for the dignity of all men and women". The Redemptorist religious province of Cebu in the Philippines have made a specific commitment in this regard: "Moved by the poverty and dehumanised condition of our people, and encouraged by their faith and desire for justice ... We, the Redemptorists of the Province of Cebu, as an apostolic community dedicated through our vows, are called to respond to the urgent needs of our people, especially the most abandoned and the poor ..."

== Religious formation ==
After an initial period of contact and discernment, the person seeking to enter the Redemptorists becomes a "candidate" and goes to live in one of the communities so that both sides might become better acquainted. This lasts about two years during which they learn about Redemptorist prayer, life, and ministry.

Assuming that all goes well, the candidate then begins the novitiate, lasting a year. The novitiate year is crucial, for it is then "... that the novices better understand their divine vocation, and indeed one which is proper to the institute, experience the manner of living of the institute, and form their mind and heart in its spirit, and so that their intention and suitability are tested." Thus, the novices are given the opportunity for longer periods of prayer and spiritual reading as well as silence in order to reflect on the vocation God is offering and nature of their response. The spiritual development of the novice is of particular focus, especially through spiritual direction. During the novitiate the history and constitutions of the congregation are studied in depth.

A simple profession is made at the end of the novitiate, and the person officially becomes a member of the Redemptorists for "By religious profession, members assume the observance of the three evangelical counsels by public vow, are consecrated to God through the ministry of the Church, and are incorporated into the institute with the rights and duties defined by law." At this point it is normal to begin studying philosophy and theology at university level. During this time there is ample opportunity to experience a variety of ministries in which the Redemptorists are engaged, both in the member's home country and internationally. Temporary vows are renewed annually.

At the end of this period of formation, which lasts for a minimum of three years perpetual profession (final vows) is made and ordination to the diaconate and presbyterate follows for those called to holy orders (i.e. to become a priest).

As the academic programs come to an end, all Redemptorists in temporary vows are required to participate in a pastoral experience for a minimum of six months to a year, outside of a brother's home province.

== Religious vows ==
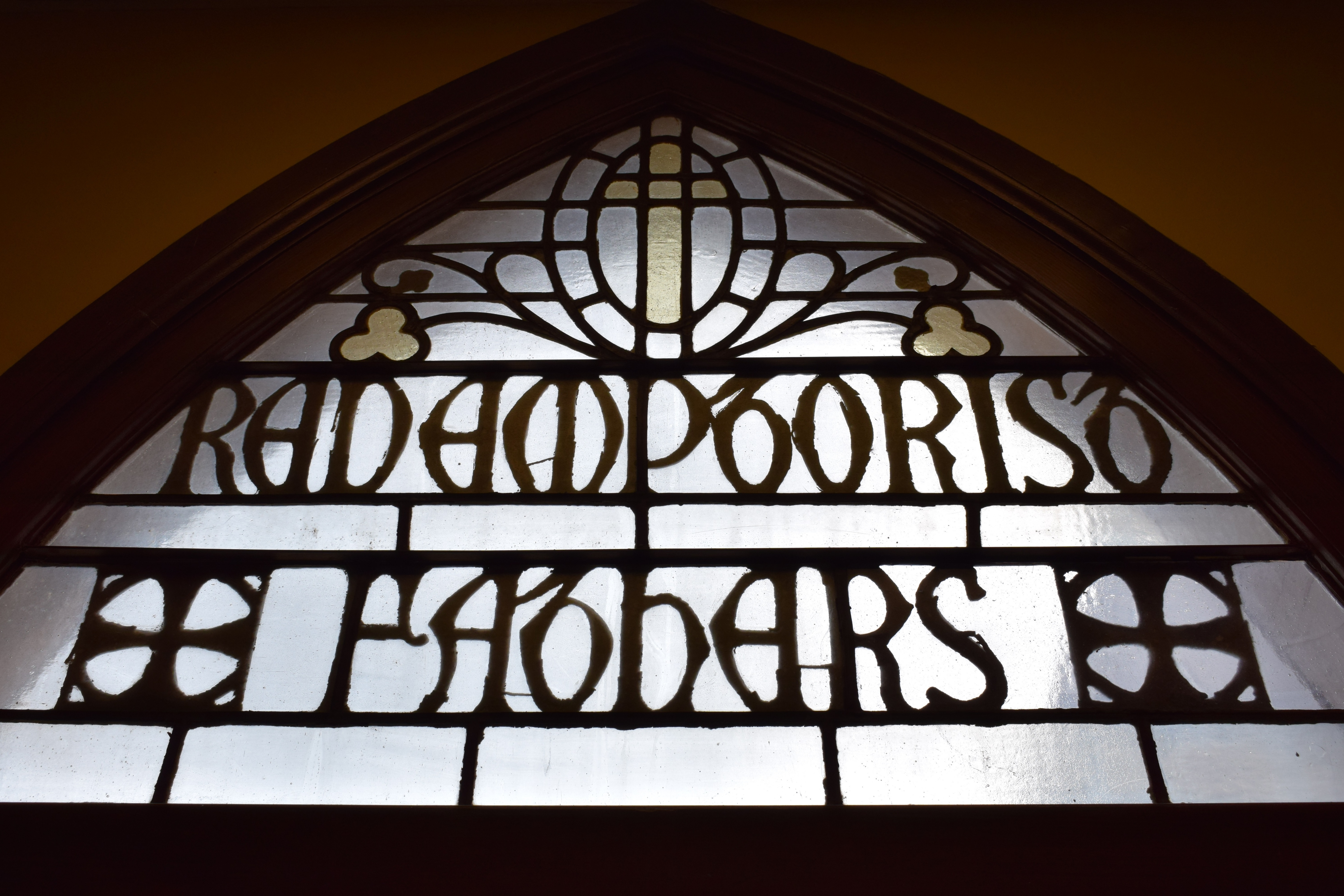
A window from the office of St. Alphonsus Ligouri "Rock" Catholic Church in St. Louis, Missouri

As members of a religious congregation, Redemptorists embrace the evangelical counsels, taking the three traditional religious vows of poverty, chastity and obedience. Poverty means that all possessions are held in common and that no member may accumulate wealth. Chastity means more than abstaining from sexual activity and its purpose is to make the religious totally available for service; it is also a sign that only God can completely fill the human heart. For a member of a religious congregation, obedience is not slavishly doing what one is told by the superior but being attentive to God's will by prayerfully listening to the voice of the person in charge. For the Redemptorist, the three vows challenge those values presented as being important by modern-day society. Recognising that the living out of the three traditional vows can be truly challenging, each Redemptorist takes a fourth vow and oath, that of perseverance.

== Organization ==
The Generalate is in Rome. The most fundamental unit of the Redemptorists is the local community in which members live together, combining their prayers, experiences, successes and failures, as well as any possessions for the service of the Gospel. Each community has a local superior who is chosen to exercise the ministry of leadership and the service of authority for the common good. The superior is assisted by a vicar and a group of advisors.

Local communities are organized into larger groups: Missions, regions, vice-provinces, provinces. A province is led by a provincial and his council, composed of elected members. In terms of governance, the members of each province elect representatives who gather in a Provincial Chapter. Vice-provinces usually look to a founding province to provide support in terms of personnel and finances until it is able to become self-sufficient. Otherwise, they enjoy the freedom and authority necessary to adjust matters to the particular needs of its mission. Regions and missions are normally communities established in new missionary areas and they depend on the founding province or vice-province.

The Superior General convokes the General Chapter every six years. The General Chapter is the primary governing and representative body of the Redemptorists, carefully examining the mission of the congregation in accordance with the spirit of Alphonsus Liguori and its traditions. The day-to-day international affairs of the congregation are handled by the General Council, which is composed of a superior general and six consultors. The General Council is both a directive and executive body.

=== Regions and provinces ===
- South Europe: 6 provinces and 2 regions
- North Europe: 8 provinces, 2 vice-provinces, 2 regions and 1 mission,
- North America: 4 provinces (Baltimore, Denver, Canada (founded in 2019 and composed of the former provinces of Edmonton-Toronto, Sainte-Anne-de-Beaupré, and Yorkton), and Mexico) and one vice-province (Extra-Patriam, for the Vietnamese Catholics).
- Latin America: 13 provinces, 11 vice-provinces, 4 regions and 2 missions.
- Africa: 1 province, 5 vice-provinces, 2 regions and 5 missions.
- Asia-Oceania: 6 provinces, 5 vice-provinces, 4 regions and 2 missions.

== Regional development ==
=== Africa ===
In 1899 the Belgian fathers were requested by their government to take charge of a number of missions in the Congo State, at that time a Belgian colony: Kinkanda, Kionzo, Kimpese, Matadi, Sonagongo and Lake Tumba.

In 1987 the Denver Province established a mission in Nigeria which was so fruitful that it soon became a vice-province. The members of the vice-province have made concerted efforts to involve the laity in their work. The Redemptorists also minister in Angola (1967); Burkina Faso; Ghana; Ivory Coast (1993); Madagascar (1967); Niger; Zimbabwe (established by the British Redemptorists in 1960 and revitalized in 1989)

In 1990 the Indian Redemptorists began a mission in Kenya where there are several professed members.

In South Africa Redemptorists administer parishes in Cape Town, Rustenburg and Howick. There is also a convent of Redemptoristines sisters in Merrivale, KwaZulu-Natal. For the Redemptorists of Southern Africa "... Justice and Peace is part and parcel of everything we are and do. In the South African context ... we are called by the poor to a simple life-style and we cannot avoid the struggle of the outcasts and oppressed of the townships and the desperate plight of the poor."

In May 2011 a number of allegations of child sexual abuse by a member of the institute in South Africa were revealed on the RTÉ programme Prime Time Investigates. Alan Shatter, the Minister for Justice and Equality, stated:

I have been in touch with the Garda Commissioner about this matter who, of course, shares my concern at the revelations in the programme. The Superintendent in charge of the Domestic Violence and Sexual Assault Investigation Unit is being appointed to examine the programme. In particular, he will examine whether any criminal behaviour was disclosed which can be pursued in this jurisdiction.

=== Australia and New Zealand ===
The first house established was in Singleton, New South Wales, but during the summer heat missions were conducted in the cooler climate of New Zealand's dioceses. As Singleton was an unsuitable base, the community oversaw the building of a new monastery at Mount St Alphonsus, Waratah, New South Wales. It was opened on the founder's feast, 1887, just five years after the Redemptorists' arrival. In the first year at Waratah the community conducted 45 missions through New South Wales, Victoria and South Australia. A new house in Ballarat followed in 1888 and work began on a new monastery in the suburb of Wendouree. It was officially opened in September 1893.

With the south now being cared for by the Ballarat community, those in Waratah looked north to Queensland and the first missions were preached there in 1889. Missions began in Brisbane and its surrounds, with their success convincing the Archbishop to extend the programme to the far flung country parishes.

The first structure that was purpose-built for the Redemptorists in New Zealand was St Gerard's Church in Wellington in 1908.

In 1927, the province of Australasia, which included Australia and New Zealand, was created. New Zealand became an independent province in 1970 and from New Zealand, the Redemptorists went to Samoa in 1972.

The years after World War II were a time of rapid expansion. As well as ongoing participation in the development of the vice-provinces in the Philippines and in Singapore and Malaysia, further houses were opened in New Town in Tasmania and Townsville and Miami in Queensland. There were also communities established in New South Wales: Campbell's Hill, Concord, Fairfield West, Penrith and Yagoona. In Victoria, there were communities at Balwyn, Box Hill, Brighton, Wongarra and Yarraville. In Melbourne, the order also conducted a psychotherapy clinic and Training Institute, Hofbauer Centre, from 1977 until 1998.

The Redemptorist Lay Community formed during the 1980s and led to the Olympic Village Exodus Community in Melbourne's Heidelberg West area in 1998, attempting to meet identified emerging needs of local residents. The live-in members of the Exodus Community volunteer their services to the Community and its ministries. Another Exodus Community was later established in Wendouree West in Ballarat. Exodus Community is currently supported by 50 volunteers.

Missionary activity continues to flourish across Australia. Through parochial missions, preaching, retreats, adult education, teaching in universities, social justice work, counselling, accompaniment of indigenous communities, chaplaincies, devotions to Our Lady of Perpetual Help, working with people on the margins of society and promoting the family through the Majellan magazine, Redemptorists have sought to highlight that people matter greatly to God. For the Australian Redemptorists, the issue of social justice "... matters to the Redemptorists for it is at the core of our mission in the world."

=== India ===
Three Irish Redemptorists Mathew Hickey, Gerard McDonell and Leo O'Halloran from the province of Dublin arrived in Sri Lanka in the year 1938. Redemptorists established a foundation in India in the 1940 when the first community was established in Bangalore.

It was Hugo Kerr, the Provincial Superior of the province of Dublin who obtained permission from Maurice Bernard Departures, the Bishop of Mysore, to establish a foundation in Bangalore. In the Lent of 1941 St. Gerard's House at John Armstrong Road became the First Permanent residence of the Redemptorists. On 1 October 1945 the Indian Redemptorist mission became a Vice-Province and Mathew Hickey was the first Vice-Provincial. And the next ten years (from 1945 to 1955) saw great structural developments with Mt. St. Alphonsus (MSA) being built which would be the permanent house of the Studentate (7 June 1951) and the much awaited Holy Ghost Parish was opened for public worship on 24 May 1953. It was during this time St. Alphonsus School with the help of Sisters of St. Joseph of Tarbes, began in the Students' wing of MSA. The school was later moved to Davis Road which stands till today catering to the education of the poor children who come from the vicinity of the area. In July 1964 Sadupadesa College on Hennur Road was built to house students who would study philosophy. It is now turned into a Juvenate which is the first stage of formation (as of 2015). In July, 2010 Holy Redeemer Parish was erected in Sadupadesa.

The Vice-Province of Bangalore grew steadily facing all odds and overcoming all obstacles to become the province of Bangalore on 15 August 1972 and also took a momentous initiative in the year 1990 by establishing a Redemptorist community in Kenya, Africa. Now the mission has 7 indigenous priests along with the members of the province serving in the mission. The Province of Bangalore has also given birth to two other units, the Liguori Province of Kerala and the Vice-province of Majella along the western coast of India.

As of 2011 there were some 260 Redemptorists in India, belonging to two Provinces, one Vice-Province, one Region and one Mission. The Region of Alwaye was established in 1992 and became a Province (Province of Liguori) in 2008. The Region of Mumbai was established in 1999 and was raised to the status of a Vice-Province in 2011. The Mission of Kenya began in 1990 and there are several perpetually professed Kenyan members.

=== Mesopotamia (now Iraq) ===
Christianity first arrived during the 1st and 2nd centuries AD through the preaching of St Thomas the Apostle. Centuries later, in 1952, Cardinal Eugène Tisserant approached the Superior General in Rome Fr. Amerigo Buijs, a Dutch priest, asking if the Redemptorists would take on a new mission in Iraq. The missionaries from Flemish Belgian province accepted the task. In 1958, the new Chaldean Patriarch Paulus III Cheikho (1958-1989) invited the Redemptorist Fathers officially to come to Baghdad. Fr Jan Praats and Fr Maurits Demarey were the first to arrive. In 1960, Fr Lucien Cop joined them. Four years later in 1964 Fr Frans Van Stappen (known as Fr Francis) arrived in Baghdad, and in 1965 Fr Vincent Van Vossel arrived together with Fr M. Demarey.

=== The Philippines ===
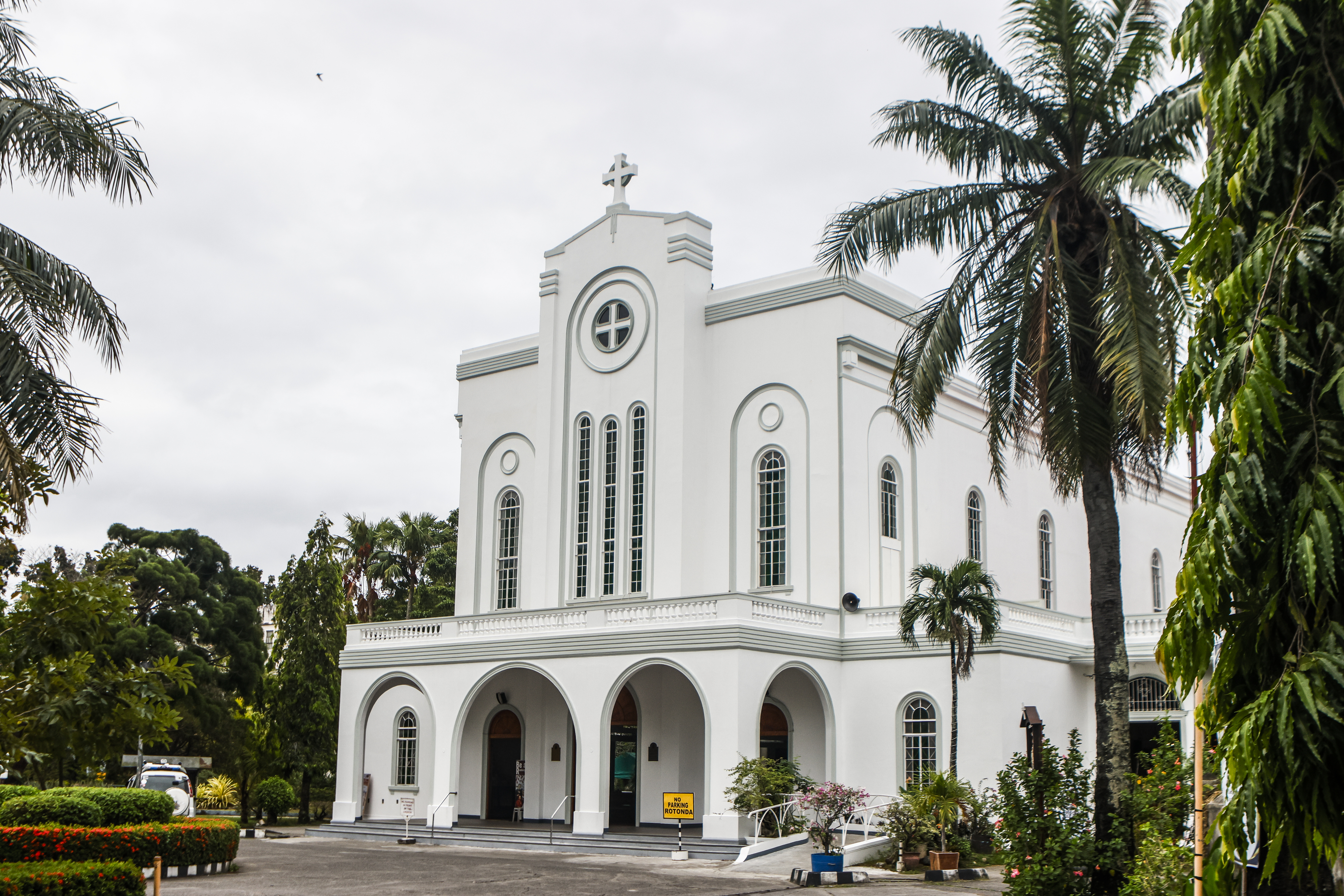
St. Clement's Church – Redemptorists Iloilo.

The first Redemptorists, belonging to the Irish province, arrived in Opon, Cebu, on 30 June 1906, setting up missions in Compostela, San Francisco and on the Camotes Islands. From 1914 to 1928 further communities were established, the most prominent being: Luzon (where the Redemptorists preached the first mission completely in Tagalog), Lipa, Iloilo, Tacloban and Cagayan de Oro on Mindanao.

In 1928, the Philippines was divided into two vice provinces, each under a different province—the Cebu vice-province responsible for the Visayas and Mindanao under the Irish province; and the Manila vice-province responsible for Luzon under the Australian province, now headquartered at the National Shrine of Our Mother of Perpetual Help in Baclaran.

The Second Vatican Council (1962–1965) had a profound impact on the Redemptorist Congregation and this resulted in them pledging themselves more strongly to the poor and disadvantaged in imitation of Alphonsus Liguori. When the political and social upheavals came in the 1960s and 1970s the Filipino Redemptorists stood in solidarity with those seeking justice and equality for they were to "... embrace the mission to proclaim by word and action, the Gospel of justice so that the poor's aspirations can be fully realised in Christ, the source of liberation."

In 1996, the Cebu vice-province became an independent province, known as the Cebu Province.

=== Vietnam ===
Redemptorists arrived to Vietnam in 1925, with 66 missionary members from the Canadian Redemptorist Missionaries of the Sainte-Anne-de-Beaupré Shrine. The Province of Vietnam was officially established in 1964, with apostles in major cities such as Ha Noi, Sai Gon, Da Nang, Da Lat, and more. Their activities briefly stopped by 1975, likely due to the fact that the Vietnam War resumed and the South was defeated.

Redemptorist missionaries are still active in Vietnam to this day, and have sent members to other countries such as Australia, Thailand, Laos, Philippines, Angola, France, the US and Canada.

=== United Kingdom and Irish provinces ===
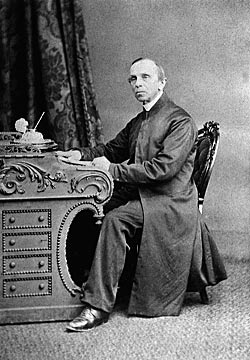
Vladimir Pecherin (1807–1885), one of the first Redemptorists to work in Ireland

Redemptorists arrived from Belgium in 1843, and the new province owed its great progress to Robert Aston Coffin, one of the band of converts associated with Cardinal John Henry Newman, Cardinal Henry Edward Manning, and William Faber in the Oxford Movement. Coffin was engaged in missions until he was appointed first provincial in 1865. During his administration new houses were founded in various parts of the United Kingdom, St Mary's Monastery at Perth being the first Scottish monastery opened since the Reformation. By 1910, the province had eight houses: Clapham in London, Bishop Eton in Liverpool, St Benet's Church, Monkwearmouth, Bishop's Stortford, Kingswood, Edmonton and a total membership of one hundred and twenty-three.

Today the Redemptorists of Britain are engaged in a variety of ministries: the mission amongst the poor of Zimbabwe, a renewal centre in Kinnoull, Perth where people can spend time in prayer and reflection as well as parishes in Birmingham, Bishop Eton in Liverpool and London. Their goal is "to defend our joy in Jesus Christ and to bring to others Plentiful Redemption"

In 1898 the houses in Ireland were constituted a separate province with the provincial house at Limerick. On 25 March 1901, the foundation of the juvenate house at Limerick was laid. The province of Ireland then comprised four houses: Limerick, Dundalk, Belfast, and Esker, Co. Galway. In 1904, John Creagh orchestrated the antisemitic "Limerick boycott" by giving two antisemitic sermons that invoked the blood libel, blamed Jews for the crucifixion of Jesus Christ, and called for a de facto boycott; under Creagh's watch, a number of Jews were violently beaten, and the majority of the Jewish population was driven out of Limerick after two years of near-total economic boycott. Today, the provincial house is located in Dublin with other communities being found in Belfast (Clonard Monastery and the parish of Saint Gerard), Cork, Dundalk, Athenry in Galway, Limerick and four houses are established. The Irish Redemporists are involved in parish ministry, youth work, Redemptorist publications and retreats. They also help staff the missions in Cebu in the Philippines Alec Reid, of Clonard Monastery, were instrumental in cross community initiatives, and helped facilitate the Irish Peace Process. Reid also helped promote talks for peace in the Basque country.

=== North American Province ===
==== United States ====
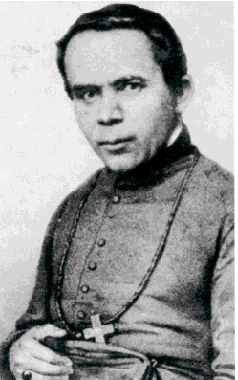
John Neumann (1811–1860), the first US bishop to be canonized

In 1828 Frederick Rese, Vicar-General of Cincinnati, visited Europe in search of priests. While at Vienna he secured three priests and three lay brothers; they arrived in New York on 20 June 1832 and began working amongst the people of northern Michigan. In 1839 they were called to Pittsburgh to assume charge of the German congregation and from this time the care of German congregations became a prominent element of the Redemptorists in North America.

The US province was erected in 1850 and one of the first tasks was the establishment of a seminary and the selection of a suitable place for a novitiate. Cumberland in Maryland, was chosen for the seminary and Baltimore for the novitiate. In 1868 the students were transferred to the new house of studies at Ilchester, Maryland and in 1907 the faculty and the students moved to Esopus, New York, on the Hudson River where a more spacious building had been erected.

In 1882, the congregation sent priests to the Archdiocese of Washington and eventually established five parishes. In 1861 they opened a community in Chicago, Illinois. Soon after, due to the many successful missions they had given in the Archdiocese of St. Louis a house was opened at St. Louis. In 1871 an important mission house was opened at Roxbury, Boston and was dedicated to Our Lady of Perpetual Help. When, in 1883, a new parish was formed, the fathers of the mission church took charge. (In 2009, its later basilica, of the same name, hosted the nationally televised funeral of Massachusetts Senator Edward Kennedy, attended by President Barack Obama, three former US presidents and first ladies, among other dignitaries.)

From 1883 onward, the Redemptorists spread throughout most of North America and are present in a variety of states such as California in the west, Michigan and Illinois in the midwest, Washington, DC, and Baltimore in the northeast and Louisiana, Mississippi and Texas in the south.

North American Redemptorists are involved in giving parochial missions, social justice, retreats, youth ministry, ministry to adults with special needs, bioethics, publication of religious materials and chaplaincy work as well as outreach to the Hispanic community, ministry amongst the poor, and helping to staff missions in the Caribbean The Denver Province owns Liguori Publications, which publishes books and Liguorian magazine.

==== Canada and Caribbean ====
In 1874 the Redemptorists were called to St. Patrick's Church, Montreal, Quebec, Canada, the only church in that city for English-speaking Catholics. In 1878 they became the custodians of the shrine of Ste-Anne de Beaupré, near Quebec and then of St. Anne's, Montreal, a large parish in a very poor district of the city. Two other foundations were quickly established in Canada: Saint Patrick's, Toronto and Saint Peter's, New Brunswick in 1881 and 1884 respectively.

The Redemptorist presence in Canada was made a vice-province in 1894, where four more houses were opened. This province was initially dependent on the Belgian province. The West Indies were made a vice-province in 1904. There is also a house at Mayagüez in Puerto Rico. Spanish Redemptorists settled at San Juan. A parish with a population of 30,000 is confided to their care. On 26 July 1911, the Belgian houses of Canada were erected into a new province called Sainte-Anne-de-Beaupré. On May 19, 1918, the English-speaking houses in Canada, with 83 Canadian members and nine foundations, were erected into a new province called Toronto Province. The dawn of the new province also heralded the expansion of the order in parishes across the country. This included parishes in Vancouver (1923), Edmonton (1924), Moose Jaw, Saskatchewan (1927), Calgary (1929; 1931), Charlottetown (1929), Corner Brook, Newfoundland (1931), Grande Prairie, Alberta (1931), Saskatoon (1934), Dawson Creek, BC (1936), Nelson, BC (1938), Williams Lake, BC (1938), Athabasca, Alberta (1940), Wells, BC (1941), Claresholm, Alberta (1941), Winnipeg (1942) and Peterborough (1945).

The rising number of Redemptorists foundations in Western Canada led to the creation of the Edmonton Vice-Province in July 1945, which would be responsible for any foundations that were located west of the Ontario-Manitoba border. In July 1961, Edmonton achieved provincial status and took responsibility of 14 foundations and 80 members.

The Redemptorists continued to expand following the creation of the Edmonton Vice-Province and served in parishes in St. George's, Newfoundland (1947), Edson, Alberta (1949), Sudbury, Ontario (1949), Whitbourne, Newfoundland (1950), Toronto (1950), Windsor (1952), St. John's, Newfoundland (1956), and Hinton, Alberta (1958).

In 1996, due to declining numbers in both provinces, the Edmonton and Toronto Provinces were merged to become the Edmonton-Toronto Province.

The newly combined province continued to see the number of parishes administered by the Redemptorists shrink. They withdrew from Quebec City and Edmonton in 1999, Moose Jaw in 2002, Kelowna in 1999, 2002, and 2005 respectively, Saint John in 2006 and Sudbury in 2012.

On 12 August 2014 a court in Quebec approved a settlement by which the Redemptorists of the province of Sainte-Anne-de-Beaupré will pay $20 million in compensation to people who had been sexually assaulted by members of the order while school students in their care.

The Yorkton Province is an Eastern church branch of the worldwide Congregation of the Most Holy Redeemer, serving the Ukrainian Greek Catholic Church in North America and is based in Saskatchewan and Manitoba, Canada.

On August 1, 2019, the Redemptorist Provinces of Edmonton-Toronto, Sainte-Anne-de-Beaupré, and Yorkton merged to become a new province called "The Redemptorist Province of Canada". The provincial offices of the new province are located in the Bedford Park neighborhood of Toronto.

== Saints, Blesseds, and other holy people ==
Saints

- Alfonso Maria de Liguori (27 September 1696 – 1 August 1787), founder, bishop and Doctor of the Church, canonized on 26 May 1839
- Gerard Majella (6 April 1726 – 16 October 1755), professed religious, canonized on 11 December 1904
- Klemens Maria Hofbauer (26 December 1751 – 15 March 1820), patron saint of Vienna and Warsaw, canonized on 20 May 1909
- John Nepomucene Neumann (March 28, 1811 – January 5, 1860), Bishop of Philadelphia, canonized on 19 June 1977

Blesseds

- Gennaro Maria Sarnelli (12 September 1702 – 30 June 1744), priest, beatified on 12 May 1996
- Petrus Norbertus Donders (27 October 1809 – 14 January 1887), missionary to lepers in Batavia, Suriname, beatified on 23 May 1982
- Francis Xavier Seelos (11 January 1819 – 4 October 1867), missionary to the United States, beatified on 9 April 2000
- Kaspar Stanggassinger (12 January 1871 – 26 September 1899), priest, beatified on 24 April 1988
- Vicente Nicasio Renuncio Toribio and 11 Companions (1876 - died between July to November 1936), Martyrs of the Spanish Civil War, (Madrid) beatified on 22 October 2022
- José Xavier Gorosterratzu Jaunarena and 5 Companions (1877 - died between August 1936 – July 1938), Martyrs of the Spanish Civil War, (Cuenca) beatified on 13 October 2013
- Nicholas Charnetsky (14 December 1884 – 2 April 1959), bishop and martyr, beatified on 27 June 2001
- Metod Dominik Trčka (6 July 1886 – 23 March 1959), priest and martyr, beatified on 4 November 2001
- Ivan Ziatyk (26 December 1899 – 17 May 1952), priest and martyr, beatified on 27 June 2001
- Vasyl Velychkovsky (1 June 1903 – 30 June 1973), bishop and martyr, beatified on 27 June 2001
- Zynoviy Kovalyk (18 August 1903 – end of June 1941), priest and martyr, beatified on 27 June 2001

Venerables

- Domenico Blasucci (5 March 1732 – 2 November 1752), cleric, declared Venerable on 23 May 1906
- Joseph-Amand Passerat (30 April 1772 – 30 October 1858), priest, declared Venerable on 29 April 1980
- Vito Michele di Netta (26 February 1787 – 3 December 1849), priest, declared Venerable on 7 July 1935
- Giuseppe Maria Leone (23 May 1829 – 9 August 1902), priest, declared Venerable on 18 December 2024
- Antonio Filomeno Maria Losito (16 December 1838 – 18 July 1917), priest, declared Venerable on 30 September 2015
- Bernard Alojzy Łubieński (9 December 1846 – 10 September 1933), priest, declared Venerable on 6 March 2018
- Wilhelm Janauschek (19 October 1859 – 30 June 1926), priest, declared Venerable on 15 April 2014
- Alfred Pampalon (24 November 1867 – 30 September 1896), priest, declared Venerable on 14 May 1991
- Pelágio Sauter (9 November 1878 – 23 November 1961), priest, declared Venerable on 7 November 2014
- Francisco Barrecheguren Montagut (8 August 1881 – 7 October 1957), widow and father of Blessed María Concepcion Barrecheguren García and priest, declared Venerable on 5 May 2020
- Vítor Coelho de Almeida (22 September 1899 – 21 July 1987), priest, declared Venerable on 5 August 2022

Servants of God

- Cesare Sportelli (19 June 1701 – 19 April 1750), lawyer and priest
- Paolo Cafaro (5 July 1707 – 13 August 1753), priest
- Johann Baptist Stöger (4 October 1810 – 3 November 1883), professed religious
- Emmanuele Ribera (2 March 1811 – 8 November 1874), priest
- Vittorio Lojodice (25 July 1834 – 10 January 1916), priest
- Francesco Pitocchi (21 September 1852 – 13 June 1922), priest
- Friedrich Grote (16 July 1853 – 30 April 1940), priest
- Antonio Solari (27 January 1861 – 14 July 1945), oblate, declared as Servant of God on 18 October 1995
- Isidoro Fiorini (23 May 1867 – 24 July 1956), priest, declared as Servant of God on 24 September 2002
- Ángel Vesga Fernández (1 October 1886 – 1 October 1936), Martyr of the Spanish Civil War, declared as Servant of God on 8 May 2008
- Celso Alonso Rodríguez (28 July 1896 – 29 September 1936), Martyr of the Spanish Civil War, declared as Servant of God on 8 May 2008
- Danylo (Roman) Bakhtalovs'kyi (21 October 1897 – 6 October 1985), Ukrainian priest and founder of the Sisters of the Immaculate Heart of Mary of Fatima, declared as Servant of God on 30 September 2005
- Ján Ivan Mastiliak (5 November 1911 – 18 September 1989), priest, declared as Servant of God in 2014
- Jorge Gottau (23 May 1917 – 24 April 1994), Bishop of Añatuya, declared as Servant of God in 2016
- Marian Halan (28 September 1927 – 5 June 1952), professed religious and Martyr of Ukraine, declared as Servant of God on 6 July 2002
- Gioakim (Marcel) Nguyen Tân Văn (15 March 1928 – 10 July 1959), Vietnamese professed religious and martyr, declared as Servant of God on 7 January 1995

== Famous Redemptorists ==
- Michael Müller (1825–1899) author of devotional books
- William Hickley Gross (1837–1898) Archbishop of Oregon City, Oregon, US
- Antonio Maria Losito (1838–1917) priest
- Hugh MacDonald, (1841–1898) Bishop of Aberdeen
- Bernard Łubieński (1846–1933) priest
- Willem Marinus van Rossum (1854–1932) Cardinal Prefect of the Congregation for the Evangelization of the Peoples
- Patrick Clune (1864–1935) first Archbishop of Perth, Australia
- Alfred Pampalon (1867–1896) priest
- John Creagh (1870–1947) priest who delivered anti-Semitic sermons in Limerick in 1904.
- Pelágio Sauter (1878–1961) priest
- Willem Duynstee (1886-1968) priest, jurist, moralist, and professor, Netherlands
- Aloysius Joseph Willinger (1886–1973) Bishop of Monterey-Fresno, California, US
- Francis Connell (1888–1967) priest, theologian, and advisor at the Second Vatican Council
- William Tibertus McCarty (1889–1972) Bishop of Rapid City, South Dakota, US
- Liam Pilkington (1894–1977)
- Juan Campos Rodríguez (1907–1995) missionary, writer, founder of Anglo-Chinese School of Perpetual Help
- Leo James English (1907–1997) compiler and editor of an English-Tagalog dictionary (1965) and a Tagalog-English dictionary (1986)
- Joseph Owens (1908–2005)
- Charles Fehrenbach (1909–2006) author of the book Mary Day by Day
- Bernard Häring (1912–1998) priest and influential theologian at the Second Vatican Council
- Joseph Ivel Mendanha (1922–2019) first Indian Redemptorist priest
- Varkey Vithayathil (1927–2011) Cardinal & Major Archbishop of Ernakulam-Angamaly for Syro-Malabars (India)
- Frans Van Stappen (1929-1991) priest, Beveren, Belgium
- Lucien Cop (1929-2018) priest, Beveren, Belgium
- Alec Reid (1931–2013), facilitator in the Northern Ireland peace process
- Teofilo Vinteres (1932–2001) liturgical composer and former rector of the Baclaran Church
- Raymond Brennan (1932–2003) founder of the Father Ray Foundation in Pattaya, Thailand
- Ireneo Amantillo (1934–2018) Bishop of Tandag
- Vincent Van Vossel (born 1935-) priest, Beveren, Belgium
- Julio Terrazas Sandoval (1936–2015) Archbishop of Santa Cruz de la Sierra (Bolivia)
- Joe Maier (born 1939-) co-founder of the HDF Mercy Centre in Bangkok
- Benoit (Ben) Van Vossel (born 1939-) priest, Beveren-Waas, Belgium
- Rudy Romano (born 1940 - missing since 1985), a Filipino Redemptorist priest and a prominent martial law-era activist who served as the Vice President for Visayas of the Bagong Alyansang Makabayan (BAYAN) who was abducted by alleged armed state forces in Cebu City on July 11, 1985. His disappearance has become one of the prominent cases of enforced disappearances in the Philippines, with appeals even coming from Pope John Paul II.
- Emmanuel Cabajar (born 1942-) Bishop of Pagadian
- Joseph Nguyễn Tiến Lộc (1943–2022)
- Seán McManus (born 1944-)
- Tadeusz Rydzyk (born 1945-) founder and head of the Radio Maryja Family
- Clement Campos (1946–2018) well-known Indian moral theologian
- Tony Flannery (born 1947-) Irish religious writer and dissident
- Mykhaylo Koltun (born 1949-) Eparchial Bishop of Ukrainian Catholic Eparchy of Sokal–Zhovkva
- Joseph William Tobin (born 1952-) former Superior General (1997–2009), Secretary of Congregation for Institutes of Consecrated Life and Societies of Apostolic Life, former Archbishop of Indianapolis, Archbishop of Newark
- Ralph Heskett (born 1953-) Bishop of Gibraltar
- Amado Picardal (1954–2024) CBCP-BEC Executive Secretary, web blogger and "biking priest"
- Marreddy Vatti (1956–2015)
- Petro Loza (born 1979-) Ukrainian Greek Catholic hierarch
- Mykola Bychok (born 1980-) cardinal
- Ciriaco Santiago (born 1971 -), Redemptorist Brother and Photojournalist who documented President Rodrigo Duterte's brutal Philippine Drug War

== Educational institutions (partial list) ==
Schools

- Our Lady of Perpetual Succour High School (Mumbai, India)
- St Alphonsus School, Bangalore, India
- Ruamrudee International School (Bangkok, Thailand)
- Saint Alphonsus Catholic School (Cebu, Philippines) – now under the Benedictine Sisters
- de:Collegium Josephinum Bonn (Bonn, Germany)

Tertiary and other

- Alphonsian Academy
- Holy Redeemer College of The Catholic University of America
- St. Mary's College, Brockville (Toronto, Canada) — closed

== See also ==
- Radio Maryja is a radio station owned and run by the congregation
- The teen magazine, Face Up
- Sons of the Most Holy Redeemer, formerly the Transalpine Redemptorists
- Feast of the Most Holy Redeemer
- Spanish Redemptorist missions in Sichuan
