= Baclaran (disambiguation) =

Baclaran is a barangay in Parañaque, Philippines. It may also refer to:

- Baclaran station, a station on the Manila LRT Yellow Line, Pasay
- Baclaran Church, also called the National Shrine of Our Mother of Perpetual Help, Parañaque
- Baclaran Mosque, a demolished mosque that once stood in Parañaque
