= Novena to Our Mother of Perpetual Help =

Booklet of Catholic prayers

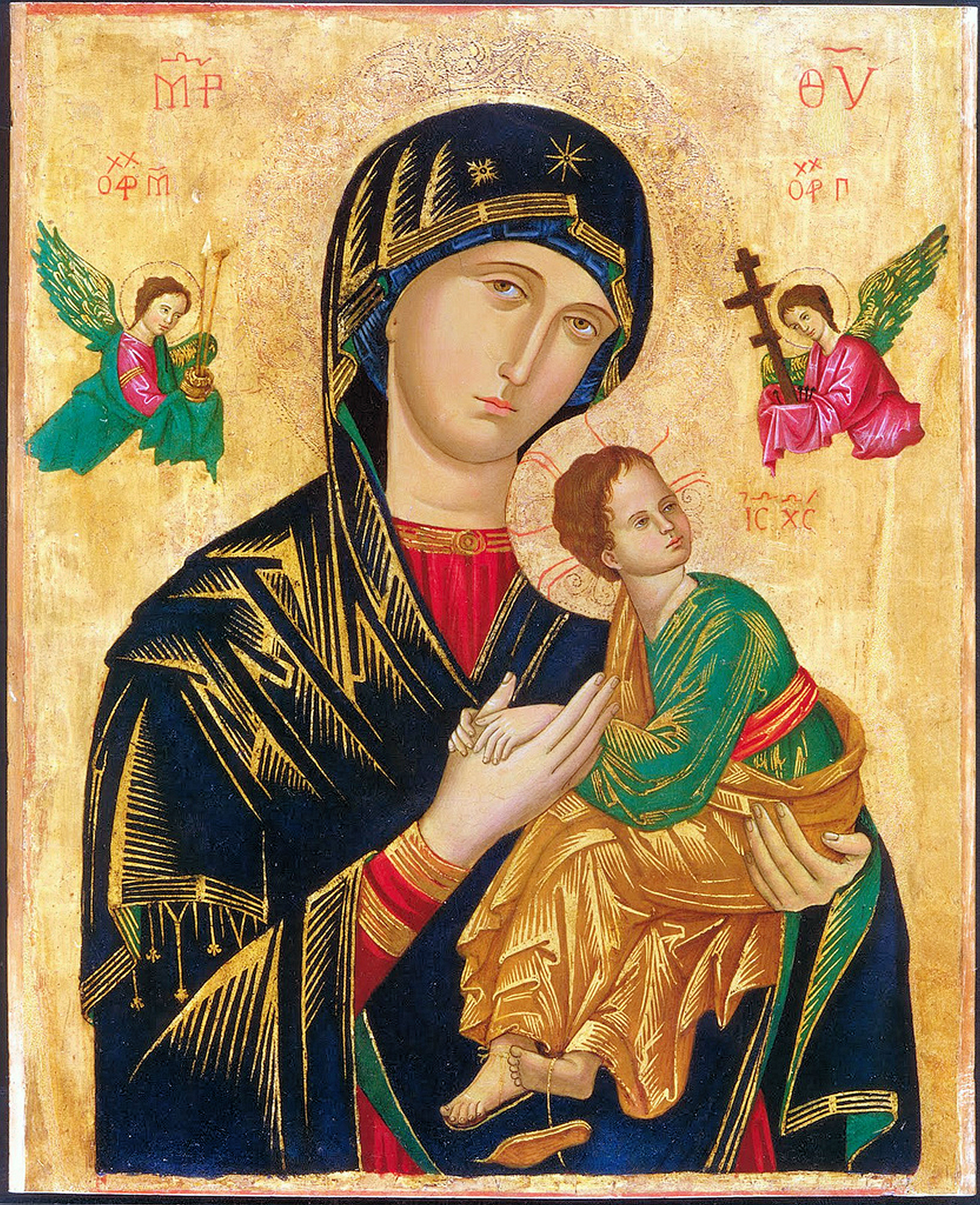
Icon of Our Mother of Perpetual Help, dating to before 1499.

The Novena to Our Mother of Perpetual Help is a booklet containing a set of prayers including the Roman Catholic novena to Our Mother of Perpetual Help, that was originally published in Jaén, Spain in 1899. It was then widely republished by American Redemptorist priests in 1927, then ultimately revised by Irish and Australian Redemptorist priests on 23 June 1948.

The present booklet was mainly co-authored by the Australian priest The Rev Leo James English, C.Ss.R, and Fra Gerard O'Donnell, and is officially presently used at the Church of Saint Alphonsus Ligouri in Rome each week, where the original icon of Our Mother of Perpetual Help is permanently enshrined.

In the Catholic Church in the Philippines, the novena was first recited at the Redemptorist-run Saint Clement's Church in La Paz, Iloilo following World War II and is still prayed there every Wednesday. The Wednesday novena has since spread to Baclaran Shrine in Pasay, elsewhere in the Philippines, and the worldwide Filipino diaspora. The popularity of the novena became known due to the authorisation granted by the Holy See to propagate the icon, along with prayers which addressed the strengthening of marriages, healing of sicknesses, and helping find employment, thus earning it a quick following from the masses.

In the United States, a nine-day televised novena is held at the Basilica and Shrine of Our Lady of Perpetual Help hosted by CatholicTV. The icon featured on the show does not bear its canonical crown.

== History ==
The earliest existing novena to Our Mother of Perpetual Help was a booklet already in its third edition, and was published by the Bishop of Madrid, José María Cos y Macho, who granted his imprimatur in 1899. These were followed by re-printing in later years.

In the United States, the first novena prayers were compiled by Reverend Joseph Chapoton, the Vice-provincial of Portland, Oregon. After his death in 1925, the laity added more prayers and hymns into the booklet.

This perhaps was the main reason why for many years, there were fixed novena prayers to Our Lady of Perpetual Help. By research within the United States, numerous texts varied from the Perpetual Help novena used in Redemptorist centers in Portland, Brooklyn, Boston, Massachusetts, Pennsylvania, and Saint Louis, Missouri. Several versions of the Novena were made and circulated from the now-closed St. Philomena's Church (Pittsburgh). One of these copies, dating to 1927, was brought to Manila in the Philippine Islands, then still a United States colony.

The novena prayers were originally designed to be recitation only by the presiding priest. After the Second Vatican Council, the laity were encouraged to participate more in religious activities, necessitating a revised, uniform text for the congregation. This new set of prayers was used in Baclaran Church and spread among Filipino congregations.

The specific acts of Benediction and Exposition of the Blessed Sacrament during the novena service, as per Canon law, have remained the exclusive domain of the presiding priest.

== Revision ==
During the reign of Pope Paul VI, a foreword on the indulgences for the novena was attached, including instructions citing Sacrosanctum Concilium (#13) to:

- Assist during Mass for collections, lector and laity recitation of the Novena within parishes;
- Permission to recite the novena in private, in cases of dire sickness or illness before the image;
- Writing a letter of thanksgiving in honour of Our Mother of Perpetual Help;
- Dropping the letter of thanksgiving or petition in its designated box provided by the parish; and
- Attaching the Benediction and Exposition of the Blessed Sacrament, citing Mediator Dei, part II, chapter IV

From the original 1927 Portland version, several common Marian hymns were included. After Vatican II, the following expiatory prayers were deleted:

- "That we may never grow so proud as to think we can do without God or religion"
- "That we may practise self-denial and penance this Lent"
- The Magnificat prayerMagnificat

== Imprimatur ==
On 17 May 1866, Pope Pius IX originally granted approval via the Sacred Congregation of Rites to three specific prayers dedicated to the Marian title of Perpetual Help. These prayers were granted a plenary indulgence of 100 days.

The Bishop of Madrid, José María Cos y Macho, granted his Imprimatur to the earliest compiled novena booklets in 1899, followed by reprints in 1902, 1917, 1927, 1935 etc.

An ordinary local permission to print the text was obtained via the vice-provincial of Portland, Oregon, Reverend Joseph Chapoton. To date, various texts were re-printed for private devotional use.

The Archbishop of Chicago, Cardinal George Mundelein gave an Imprimatur for the Perpetual Help novena in the Polish language on New Year's Eve 1934.

The Archbishop of San Francisco John Joseph Mitty gave his license on 26 August 1941 on a reprint of the original 1927 Portland version.

The Archbishop of New York, Cardinal Francis Spellman granted his license for the novena devotions in Boston, Massachusetts on 20 June 1948.

The Archbishop of Manila, Cardinal Rufino Santos on 14 April 1973, while the imprimi potest was given by the vice-provincial of Manila, Redemptorist friar Patrick Deane, CSsR.

The Archbishop of Singapore, Michel Olçomendy who granted a similar version for the town of Novena, Singapore on 28 September 1973.

== Content and ritual ==
- Immaculate Mother (hymn tune: the Pyrenean Immaculate Mary)
- Introductory prayers (optional recitation of letters of petition and thanksgiving)
- Mary Immaculate, Star of the Morning (hymn)
- Novena prayers
- Prayer for the Home
- Petitions to Our Mother of Perpetual Help
- Consecration to Our Mother of Perpetual Help (every First Wednesday of the month)
- Mother of Christ (hymn) followed by Benediction or Holy Mass
- O Saving Victim (hymn tune: O Salutaris Hostia)†
- Thanksgiving Prayer
- Prayer for the Sick
- Let Us Raise Our Voice (hymn tune: Tantum Ergo)†
- Divine Praises
- O Sacrament Most Holy (sung or recited)
- Hail Mary (a setting of the Ave Maria)

† In some communities, Salutaris Hostia and Tantum Ergo are sung in the original Latin. The Church in the Philippines meanwhile uses a different tune for Tantum Ergo that is unique to the country.

Ejaculatory prayers for courtship, against temptations, financial help, and the Memorare are also often added to the set of prayers.

== See also ==
- Our Mother of Perpetual Help
- Novena
- Baclaran Church
