= Immaculate Mary =

Popular Catholic Marian hymn

"Immaculate Mary" or "Immaculate Mother" (French: Ô Vierge Marie) is a popular Roman Catholic Marian hymn. It is also known as the Lourdes Hymn, a term which also refers to the hymn tune itself. It is often sung in honour of the Immaculate Conception of the Blessed Virgin Mary.

The earliest version of the hymn was written in 1873 by French priest and seminary director Jean Gaignet, for pilgrims to the site of the apparitions of Our Lady of Lourdes. It was set to a traditional French tune and contained eight verses; he later expanded it to 120 verses.

== Versions ==
Several versions of the hymn are in use in different parts of the world. Many of them are original sets of lyrics in various languages, set to the same tune, theme, and refrain.

A popular version dating to 1952 is as follows:

Immaculate Mary, thy praises we sing,
Who reignest in splendor with Jesus our King.
Ave, Ave, Ave Maria! Ave, Ave Maria!

In Heaven the blessed thy glory proclaim,
On earth we thy children invoke thy fair name.
Ave, Ave, Ave Maria! Ave, Ave Maria!

We pray for our Mother, The Church upon earth
And bless, sweetest Lady, the land of our birth.
Ave, Ave, Ave Maria! Ave, Ave Maria!

Another popular version which appeared in hymnals between 1900 and 1975 has, as its first line, "Immaculate Mary, our hearts are on fire." It extends to around 12 verses in order to facilitate its use in processions.

=== In the Philippines ===
A different text is sung at novena services and Masses honouring Our Lady of Perpetual Help, as well as Marian processions in general. This version is commonly associated with Baclaran Church, the Philippine's national shrine for the icon and its devotion.

English	Filipino
Immaculate Mother, to you do we plead. To ask God, our Father, for help in our need. Ave, Ave, Ave María! Ave, Ave María! We pray for our Country, the land of our birth; We pray for all nations, that peace be on Earth! Ave, Ave, Ave María! Ave, Ave, María!	Ináng Sakdál Linis, kamí ay ihingî. Sa Diyos Amá namin, awang minímithî. Ave, Ave, Ave María! Ave, Ave María! Bayang tinubua'y ipinagdárasal; At kapayapaan nitóng sánlibutan. Ave, Ave, Ave María! Ave, Ave María!
