= 1986 COMELEC walkout =

Computer technician protest in the Philippines against the election of President Marcos

On 9 February 1986, a group of computer technicians walked out from their jobs at the tabulation center of the presidential election called by President Ferdinand Marcos, claiming they observed major anomalies in the election results being reported to the public. This incident precipitated the People Power Revolution 13 days later, resulting in the end of Marcos's rule.

== Background ==
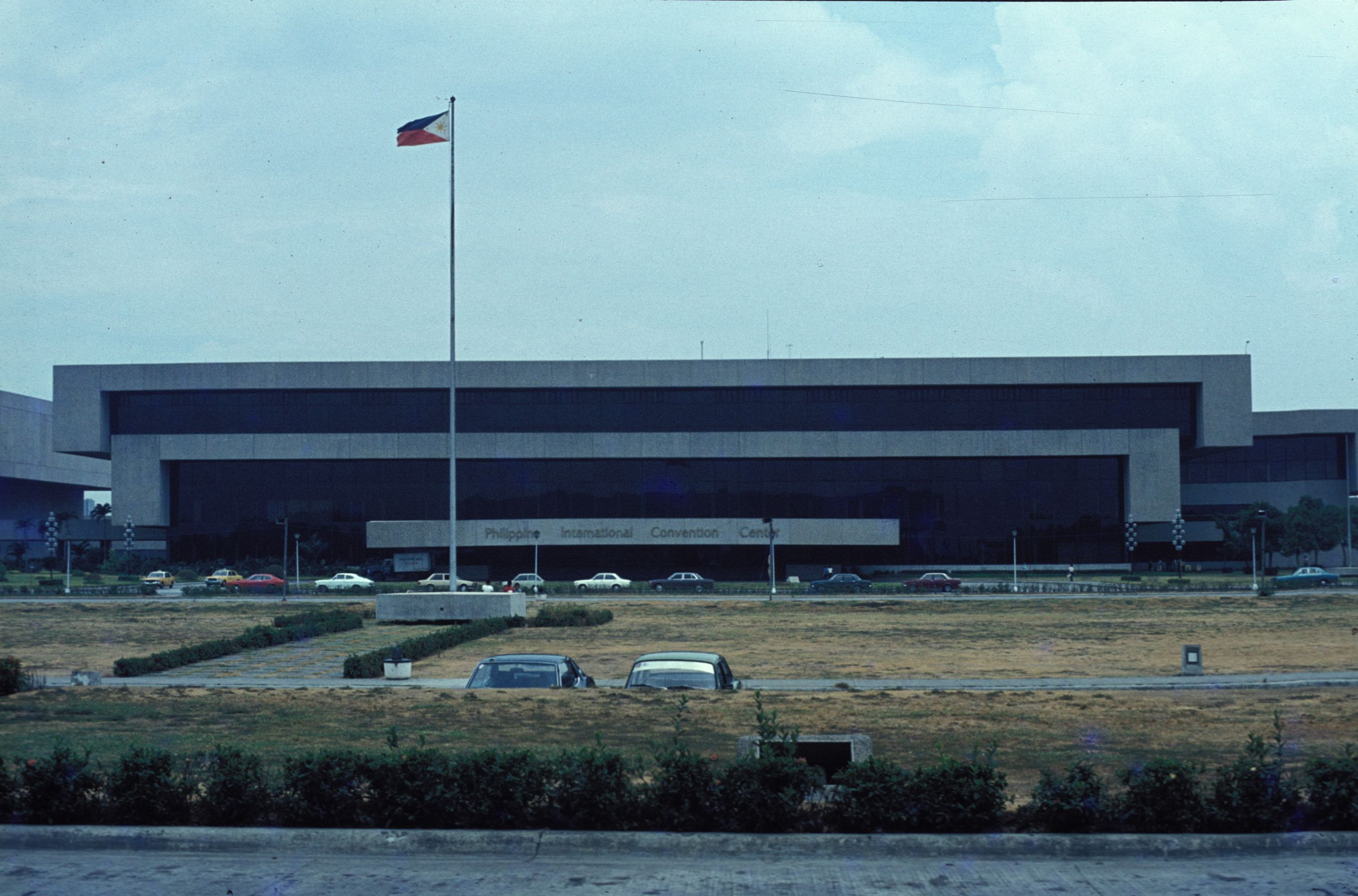
The Philippine International Convention Center, photographed in 1981, where the canvassing was held

On 3 November 1985, Philippine President Marcos announced a snap election for President and Vice President to be held on 7 February 1986.

The Commission on Elections (COMELEC) contracted the National Computer Center (NCC), a bureau under the Office of the President, to automate the tabulation of votes. NCC developed the hybrid but mostly manual tabulation system, recruited and trained additional staff, and set up the election operations center at the Philippine International Convention Center (PICC) in Pasay. As the votes were being processed, the computer technicians noticed discrepancies between their reports and the figures for the media and public posted on the large tally board at the Plenary Hall of PICC.

== The walkout ==
In protest, 35 technicians, composed of 30 women and five men, walked out of the processing center at 10:30pm on 9 February, two days after the election day. They first sought refuge in Baclaran Church in Parañaque, about 5 kilometers (3.1 mi) away from PICC, where they gave their only press conference before they went into hiding. Two women from among the 35 technicians spoke for the group. They were later identified as Juls Valderrama and Linda Kapunan.

In their public statement released to the press days after, the group emphasized that their walkout was non-partisan, and a mere declaration of their integrity and responsibility to the general public, who deserved to know the truth.

== After the walkout ==
In fear for their safety, the technicians went into hiding, first at the homes of two of the women, then at the Cenacle Retreat House in Quezon City. There, the nuns offered housing and spiritual guidance, while the Reform the Armed Forces Movement (RAM) provided physical security.

On 22 February 1986, Defense Minister Juan Ponce Enrile and General Fidel V. Ramos announced their break-away from the Marcos government, leading to the four-day People Power Revolution, which ended Marcos' rule, and brought Corazon Aquino to power. By that time, the 35 technicians who walked out of the COMELEC tabulation center 16 days earlier no longer had to hide. They were able to return to their homes and resume normal lives.
