= Baclaran Mosque =

Mosque in Metro Manila, Philippines

Coordinates: 14°31′56.15″N 120°59′30.28″E

Religion
- Affiliation: Islam
- Ownership: Baclaran-Parañaque City Islamic Center, Inc.

Location
- Interactive map of Baclaran Mosque

Architecture
- Established: 1994
- Demolished: 2013

The Baclaran Mosque, formally called the Rajah Sulaiman Grand Mosque was a mosque in Barangay Baclaran at the border of Pasay and Parañaque in Metro Manila, Philippines.

The mosque, along with nearby shopping stalls, was demolished by local authorities in 2013, due to tenants' lack of legal ownership of the site, and an ordinance to widen city streets and prevent pickpocketing and violence in the area. A belfry for the National Shrine of Our Mother of Perpetual Help is currently being built in its place, as part of the shrine's redevelopment plan that is expected to be completed in 2016.

== Background ==
Baclaran Mosque sat on reclaimed land on Roxas Boulevard just south of Epifanio de los Santos Avenue, overlooking Manila Bay. The mosque, which was topped by an onion dome, had a main room that contained four, 25-foot tall columns; the walls still showing exposed iron rebar. It was at the heart of a Muslim squatter community, whose size is estimated at 5,000 people. In April 2005, a fire destroyed 170 houses in the squatter community, leaving two children dead. The mosque was across the Catholic National Shrine of Our Mother of Perpetual Help; Los Angeles Times writer Richard C. Paddock used this contrast between the large, well-maintained church and the far more modest mosque as an opening allegory to an analysis of the inequalities between Muslims and Catholics in the Philippines.

=== Jurisdiction ===
The Baclaran Mosque is owned by the Baclaran-Parañaque City Islamic Center, Inc., whose legal representatives are Nasser Ramos, Jalil Moluk, and Sultan Sohayle Cosain Tanandato. It was built in 1994. Abdelmanan Tanandato, brother of Sultan Tanandato, claims that the Baclaran Mosque is Metro Manila's third biggest. There is some confusion as to what city government should actually have jurisdiction over the site; the mosque was constructed on the strength of a building permit from Parañaque, but the Office of Muslim Affairs (now the National Commission on Muslim Filipinos) claims the site is in Pasay.

== History ==
=== 2007 demolitions ===
In March 2007, the Metropolitan Manila Development Authority (MMDA) ordered residents around the mosque to vacate their land, stating that the structures they lived in were illegal and would be torn down in May. The MMDA offered residents ₱5,000 in compensation to move to other sites. Roberto Esquivel, said on behalf of the MMDA that the mosque would remain untouched temporarily, but the residents themselves had to move. By June, the Philippine Reclamation Authority (PRA) claimed that 121 out of 344 total families there had accepted ₱30,000 in compensation to return to their home provinces. Remaining families were quoted as vowing a "struggle" against demolition attempts. The Office of Muslim Affairs and the Embassy of Saudi Arabia in Manila wrote to the government to seek assurances that the mosque would not be affected; the PRA promised that it would not tear down the mosque, and said that a search was underway to identify a suitable relation site for the mosque.

On the morning of 7 June, a PRA demolition team and 50 Pasay city police surrounded the site, planning to begin demolition work. Some residents took refuge in the mosque; others went out to confront the demolition team and threw stones at them, leading police to respond by beating them with truncheons; furthermore, some residents set fire to their own homes as the demolitions proceeded. The demolitions were completed by noon, leaving 800 people homeless. Some evicted residents even appealed to Auxiliary Bishop of Manila Broderick Pabillo for help in delivering a letter to the government. Affected residents remained in the vicinity of the mosque, and on 26 June were granted a 60-day reprieve from the eviction order.

In the end, the residents rebuilt their homes on the same land. In June 2008, after a court order from the Parañaque Regional Trial Court for residents to vacate the area, 300 instead armed themselves with wooden clubs and successfully faced off another demolition attempt by 100 Pasay city police officers.

=== Relocation order ===
In May 2009, then Executive Secretary Eduardo Ermita sent a memorandum to the Philippine Reclamation Authority instructing them to reclaim the land and relocate the mosque to another site on Coastal Road, so that the land could be used for the construction of the Southwest Public Transport Intermodal Center. However, local residents claimed that the land would actually be used for high-end residential developments and casinos. Oscar V. Cruz, the founder of anti-gambling organization Krusadang Bayan Laban sa Jueteng (People's Crusade Against Jueteng) and then-Archbishop of Lingayen-Dagupan, spoke out in opposition to the demolition, as did the NGO Urban Poor Associates. In early August, Swiss NGO Centre on Housing Rights and Evictions also wrote a letter to then-President Gloria Macapagal Arroyo to urge her to halt the evictions and to condemn the worsening living convictions faced by the residents due to the repeated demolition attempts.

The Parañaque Regional Trial Court Branch 274 issued a writ of execution in relation to the memorandum on 13 August 2009. This writ ordered the settlers and the mosque to vacate the area peacefully, and warned that the court might use force to implement the order. The writ was delivered just before the start of Ramadan that year, leading to further consternation by the Muslims. In September, Catholic priest and activist Fr. Robert Reyes, showed solidarity with the Muslim residents by joining them in their Ramadan fast, and expressed his opposition to the relocation.

=== Violent clash ===
On 18 November 2009, Muslim residents violently clashed with Pasay city police who were attempting to enforce the demolition order. Roughly 170 shanties were destroyed without incident, but among roughly 300 residents who had sought refuge in the mosque, some began throwing stones at police. The police responded with gunfire, killing three residents including a seven-year-old boy, and injuring another seven. Nine of the police implementing the demolition order were also injured. The incident led to condemnation against the police by Anak Mindanao Party Representative Mujiv Hataman. In early comments after the incident, the police stated that no one had died.

=== Aftermath ===
After the incident, the Philippine Reclamation Authority, and Pasay Mayor Wenceslao Trinidad, continued to state that they would pursue plans to relocate the mosque. However, in the short term, they stated that the mosque would remain in place and the transit center plans would seek to "integrate" the mosque. The proposed relocation site, Lot 1555 in Barangay Tambo, was also reportedly the object of a dispute between the government and a private individual. The individual in question, Dr. Bernardo de León, asserted that the lot at the corner of Kabihasnan Street and Coastal Road was actually in Barangay San Dionisio, and belonged to his family after he had inherited it in 1984. Parañaque Mayor Florencio Bernabe countered that the property had actually been handed over to the city government in payment of back taxes. The lot had been an object of a dispute as far back as 1992, when Public Estate Authority security guards entered the compound and destroyed improvements made by De León and his family.

=== 2013 demolition ===
On 24 September 2013, the mosque was demolished by the city government due to the lack of legal land ownership held by a shopping mall, as well as an effort to reduce known pickpocketing and violence in the nearby area. In the early weeks, various illegal shopping stalls were also ordered by the city mayor to be disposed due to congesting the city streets and designated parking slots leading up to the area around the Shrine.
