= Leo James English =

Australian compiler and editor (1907–1997)

Leo James English (August 1907 – 1997) was the Australian priest, compiler and editor of two of among the first most widely used bilingual dictionaries in the Philippines. He was the author of the two companion dictionaries namely, the English–Tagalog Dictionary (1965) and the Tagalog–English Dictionary (1986). English saw the successful completion of his dictionaries that were carried out in the course of his 51 years of religious service in the Philippines. He was a member of the Redemptorists or the Congregation of the Most Holy Redeemer, a religious order that has been engaged in preaching missions using the vernacular language in the Philippines for more than seventy years. English was instrumental in the introduction and revision of the Novena to Our Mother of Perpetual Help.

== His dictionaries ==
The Tagalog–English dictionary contains about 16,000 Tagalog main words, 21,000 derivatives and 30,000 translated sentences that illustrate the use of the words. For some entries, synonyms and explanatory notes are added. The English–Tagalog dictionary contains more than 14,000 main English entries and an addition of 40,000 nuances, each both defined in English and translated into Tagalog, as well as 30,000 exemplifying sentences. Together, they are one of the most exhaustive published collections of the Tagalog language.

The dual dictionaries of English pioneered the launching of many bilingual dictionaries and thesauruses in the Philippines including those authored by the Filipino compiler, Vito C. Santos, namely the Vicassan's Pilipino–English Dictionary and the New Vicassan's English–Pilipino Dictionary (1995). James English acknowledged consulting Vito Santos’s Pilipino–English Dictionary for reference while completing his Tagalog–English Dictionary. Vito C. Santos once worked with English.

English's dictionaries had been influential in the development and propagation of the Filipino language in the Philippines and abroad.
