= Our Lady of Perpetual Help =

Title of Mary, mother of Jesus

Our Lady of Perpetual Help; Sancta Mater de Perpetuo Succursu
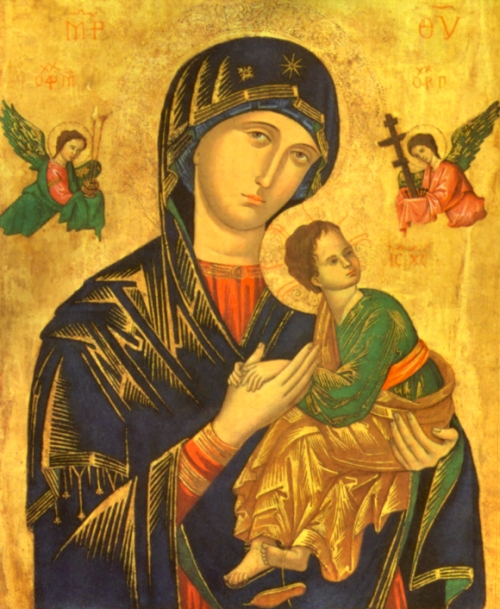
- Location: Esquiline Hill, Rome, Italy
- Date: Between 1325 and 1480
- Type: Icon of the Cretan school, Amolyntos (Passion)
- Approval: Pope Pius IX
- Venerated in: Catholic Church; Philippine Independent Church
- Shrine: The Church of Saint Alphonsus of Liguori
- Patronage: Redemptorist Order; Haiti; Almoradi in Valencia (Spain); Baclaran, Parañaque, Philippines; Diocese of Cabanatuan; Diocese of Issele-Uku; Diocese of Leeds; Diocese of Middlesbrough; Diocese of Wilcannia-Forbes; Diocese of Salina
- Feast day: 27 June first Sunday in July (Ukrainian Greek Catholic Church)

Our Mother of Perpetual Succour (Latin: Nostra Mater de Perpetuo Succursu), colloquially known as Our Lady of Perpetual Help), (Note: Pontifical decree of nomenclature granted by the Vatican Chapter and Pope Pius IX in April 1865.) is a Catholic title of the Blessed Virgin Mary associated with a 15th-century Byzantine icon and a purported Marian apparition. The image was enshrined in the Church of San Matteo in Via Merulana from 1499 to 1798 and is today permanently enshrined in the Church of Saint Alphonsus of Liguori in Rome, where the novena to Our Mother of Perpetual Help is prayed weekly.

Pope Pius IX granted a pontifical decree of canonical coronation along with its official formalized title Nostra Mater de Perpetuo Succursu on 5 May 1866. The Latin Patriarch of Constantinople, Cardinal Ruggero Luigi Emidio Antici Mattei, executed the rite of coronation on 23 June 1867.

The Congregation of the Most Holy Redeemer serve as custodians of the icon. The image is alternatively named as the Virgin of the Passion in Eastern Orthodoxy. Novena prayers are held before its feast day on 27 June every year. Due to promotion by the Redemptorist priests, the image has gained popularity among Western and Eastern Catholics. Modern reproductions are often displayed in residential homes, commercial establishments, and public transportation.

== History of the Marian title ==
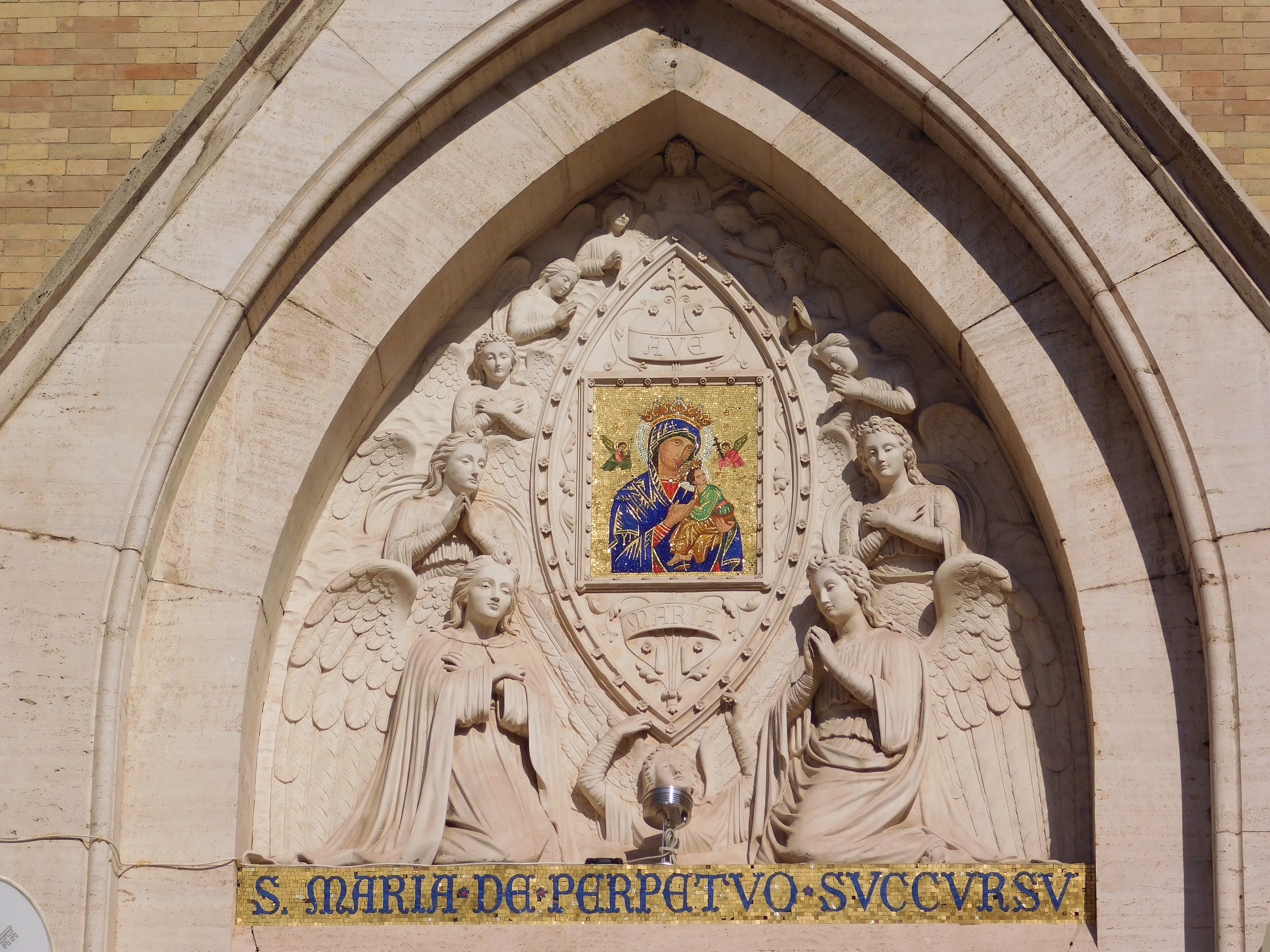
The facade Tympanum of its current temple in Via Merulana, Rome

The Cretan image originated as an Eastern Orthodox icon of the Virgin of the Passion called Amolyntos which depicted the Madonna and Child along with two angels carrying the Holy Instruments of the Passion of Jesus Christ.

The current title derives from the external door tymphanum of the Augustinian Church of San Matteo in Via Merulana, where the antiquated inscription from 1579 once bore the invocation:

Deiparæ Mater et Virginis Succursu Perpetui
(Latin for 'Virginal Mother who bore God, May always Assist us')

The Order of Saint Augustine already had a devotion to this Marian title based on a namesake cloistered monastery "Our Lady of Help" (Italian: Madonna del Soccorso) in Corleone, Palermo, Sicily.

This posthumous title was formalized by Pope Pius IX based on the history of the older church that housed the icon in the present accorded title "Holy Mother of Perpetual Succour" (Latin: Sancta Mater de Perpetuo Succursu). The same decorative style is reconstructed in its current original shrine.

== Claims of origin ==
=== Painted by Andreas Rizo of Candia ===
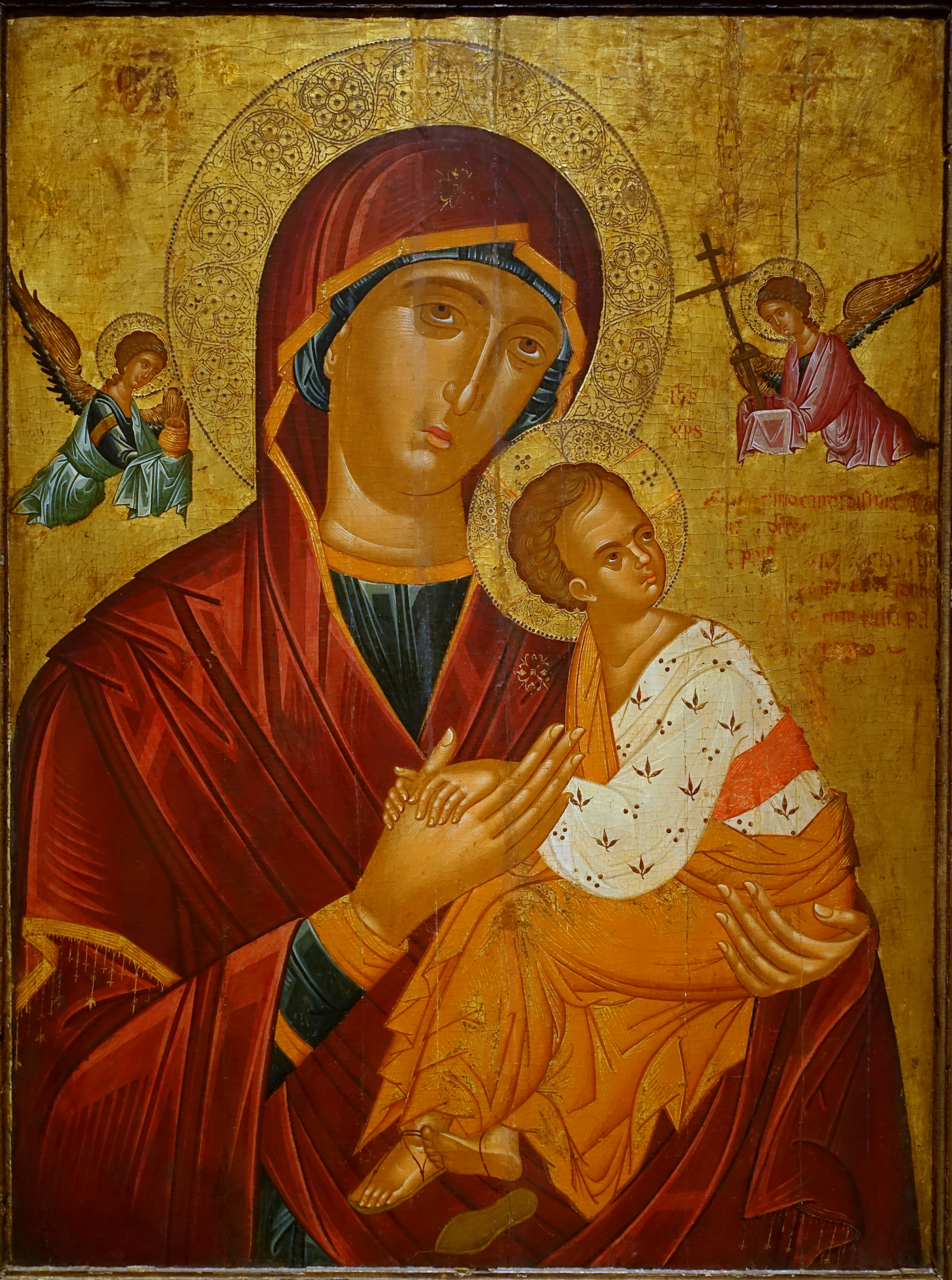
The Theotokos Amolyntos, by Cretan iconographer Andreas Rizo de Candia (1421–1492). Tempera paint on wood Panel. Princeton University Art Museum.

According to many art historians, the image was painted by the leading painter of the Cretan school, Andreas Rizo de Candia (1421–1492), who created several works bearing high resemblance to the icon, many for export to Italy.

A pious tale later emerged through the published account of Jesuit priest Father Concezio di Carroci, who later alleged that the image was originally stolen from Lasithi, Crete by an anonymous Roman merchant. This pious account was popularized by the sensationalized tale of a Marian apparition to a young maiden, now related to the icon being transferred to the Church of San Matteo in Via Merulana.

The former Archpriest of Saint Peter's Basilica, Cardinal Francesco Nerli Jr. also praised the icon for its miraculous claims of glorious wonder (Latin: Miraculorum Gloria Insignis).

=== The Monastery of Kardiotissa ===
According to the Keras Kardiotissas Monastery, the icon was painted by Lazarus Zographos (810–865 AD) and was known as the Panagia Kardiotissa (Greek: Παναγίας Καρδιώτισσας), due to the depiction of the Mother of God holding the Child Jesus near her heart. Historian Stergios Spanakis had argued that the miraculous icon was the reason for the founding of the monastery. The Italian Franciscan priest and traveler Cristoforo Buondelmonti visited Crete in 1415, wrote of a similar icon being miraculous:

"Βαδίζαµε ανάµεσα σε πυκνοδασωµένα πετρώδη βουνά µέχρι που φθάσαµε στην εκκλησία της Καρδιώτισσας, που πολλές φορές είχε φανερωθή στους πιστούς µε θαύµατα.
(Greek for 'We walked between densely forested stony mountains until we reached the church of Kardiotissa, which had appeared to the faithful many times with miracles.')"

Accordingly, the icon alleging to be the same image was claimed to be stolen from the monastery in 1498 The earliest written account of the icon after its abduction comes from a Latin and Italian plaque placed in the church of San Matteo in Via Merulana where it was first venerated by the public in 1499. The writer of the icon is unknown, but according to a parchment attached to the painting that accompanied the icon, it was stolen by a merchant sailing to Rome from the island of Crete. The image remained in the private possession of a Roman merchant and his family until 27 March 1499, when the icon was transferred to the church of San Matteo where it remained for 300 years. The picture was then popularly called the "Madonna di San Matteo".

=== According to the Redemptorist Order ===
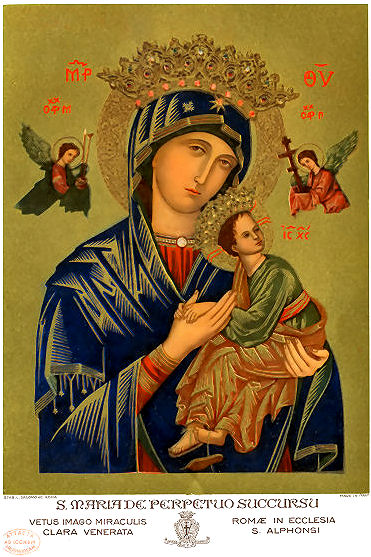
The official publication of the venerated image by the Order of the Redemptorists

The Congregation of the Most Holy Redeemer maintain a robust account of the icon and its passage from the private hands of a merchant family in Rome to its final and current location at Sant'Alfonso di Liguori, on the Esquiline Hill in Rome. The accounting includes the story of a merchant who secured the icon from Crete, and brought it to his family's home in Rome, during the late 15th century. The story includes a passage of a young member of the family, the six-year-old daughter of the merchant, who was visited by the Virgin Mary in a dream. Part of the accounting includes the following passage:

At last, the Blessed Virgin Mary appeared to the six-year-old daughter of this Roman family and told her to tell her mother and grandmother that the picture of Holy Mary of Perpetual Help should be placed in the Church of Saint Matthew the Apostle, located between the basilicas of Saint Mary Major and Saint John Lateran.

The icon remained at Saint Matthew's for three centuries. For at least the final 60 years of the 18th century, St. Matthew's was occupied by the Augustinian Order of the Catholic Church. When war broke out in Rome in 1798, the icon was moved to the Church of Saint Mary in Posterula, near the "Umberto I" bridge that crosses the Tiber River in Rome. The icon remained "hidden" there until Pope Pius IX granted the possession of the icon to the Redemptorists by Pontifical decree in 1865. The Church of Saint Mary in Posterula was later demolished in 1880.

According to the account by the Redemptorists: "In January 1866, Fathers Michael Marchi and Ernest Bresciani went to Saint Mary's in Posterula to receive the picture from the Augustinians.". The Redemptorists had purchased the property where the former Saint Matthew's had stood, and had established and built the modern Sant'Alfonso di Liguori, in honor of the founder of their congregation. Thus, the venerated icon of the Catholic Church was returned to the location described by the Virgin Mary in the dream of the merchant's daughter, that is, at the church between Saint Mary Major and Saint John Lateran.

Redemptorist tradition holds that Pope Pius IX declared, in 1866, that the Redemptorists make the icon known to the world, and so, several copies were made and sent to Redemptorist parishes around the world.

== Translation (transfer) of the image ==
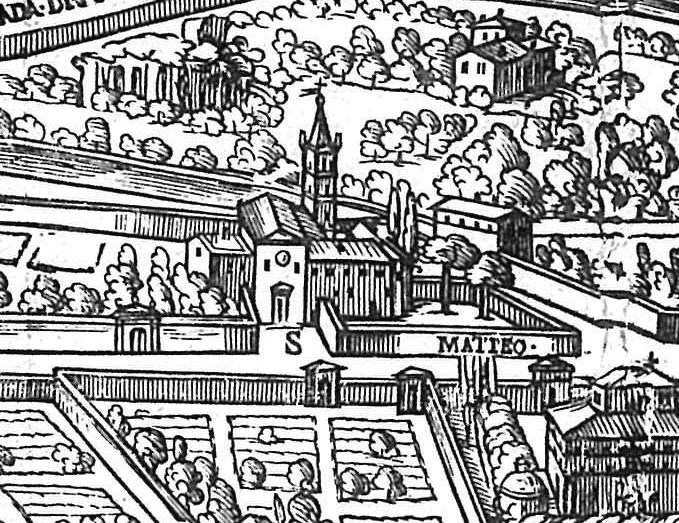
The Augustinian Church of Saint Matthew in Via Merulana. Woodcut by Roman artisan Giovanni Maggi (1566—1630). "The Maps of Rome", 1 January 1625.

In 1798, French troops under Prince Louis-Alexandre Berthier occupied Rome as part of the French Revolutionary Wars, establishing the short-lived Roman Republic and taking Pope Pius VI prisoner. Among the several churches demolished during the French occupation was San Matteo in Via Merulana, which housed the icon. The Augustinian friars who rescued the icon first took it to the nearby Church of Saint Eusebius, then later set it up on a side altar in the Church of Santa Maria in Posterula.

In January 1855, the Redemptorist priests purchased Villa Caserta in Rome along the Via Merulana and converted it into their headquarters. Decades later, Pope Pius IX invited the Redemptorist Fathers to set up a Marian house of veneration in Rome, in response to which the Redemptorists built Sant'Alfonso di Liguori at that location. The Redemptorists were thus established on the Via Merulana, not knowing that it had once been the site of the Church of San Matteo and shrine of the once-famous icon.

== Custodianship ==
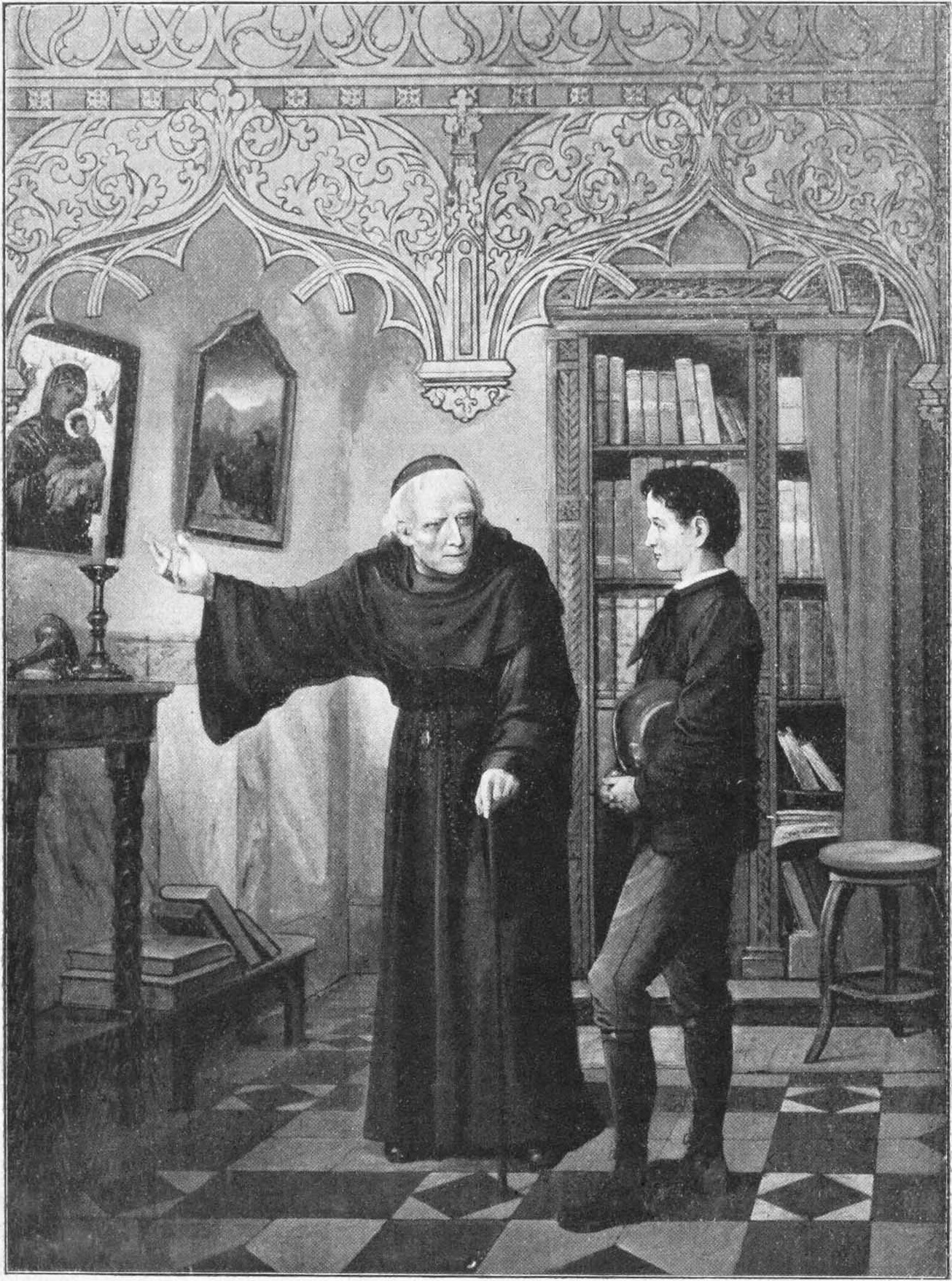
The Augustinian friar Agostino Orsetti and Redemptorist missionary, Michael Marchi discussing the image at the Church of San Matteo in Via Merulana. Religious pamphlet, De Volks Missionaris, 15 November 1916.

The icon was moved to the former Church of Saint Matthew on 27 March 1499 by the Augustinians who were custodians of the image. The icon remained damaged and unrestored at the backside chapel of the Church of Saint Matthew, where an Augustinian monk, Agostino Orsetti complained that the devotees did not venerate the icon well enough due to an already existing image of "The Madonna of Grace" venerated in the main altar. A younger friend of Orsetti, the Redemptorist missionary, Michael Marchi saw the opportunity for the Order of Redemptorists planning to build a new church in the Esquilline Hill. This proposal was brought to Father—General Nicholas Mauron who then petitioned Pope Pius IX for papal dispensation to transfer the custodianship of the original image.

Pope Pius IX sent a letter on 11 December 1865 to Father—General Nicholas Mauron, which ordered that the Marian image be once again publicly venerated in Via Merulana, the new designated church of Saint Alphonsus of Ligouri. The same pontiff directed the Augustinian friars to surrender the original icon to the Redemptorist priests, on condition that the Redemptorists must supply the Augustinian priests with another adequate picture in exchange as a gesture of goodwill.

The instructions of the Pontifical order to the Redemptorists were:

"The Prefect of Propaganda, Cardinal Alessandro Barnabò shall call the Superior of the community of Sancta Maria in Posterula and will tell him that it is Our desire that the image of Most Holy Mary, referred to in this petition, be again placed between Saint John the Lateran and Saint Mary Major; the Redemptorists shall replace it with another adequate picture." — Pope Pius IX

The original icon remains under the care of the Redemptorist Fathers at the Church of St. Alphonsus of Ligouri with the latest restoration of the icon having taken place in 1990.

== Feast Day ==
The commemoration of Our Lady of Perpetual Help was fixed by Pope Pius IX on 27 June as a feast (second class double) in May 1876. It remained a feast on the General Roman Calendar appearing on the calendar of 1960. In the calendar reform following the Ecumenical Council of Vatican II it was removed from the universal calendar and then added by national episcopal conferences. The countries which include in it their national liturgical calendars are: Costa Rica, Haiti, Mexico, Peru, Puerto Rico, and Russia. The commemoration enjoys the rank of feast on the Redemptorist liturgical calendar, with its own propers for the Liturgy of the Hours and the Mass. There are also propers for the Mass in the Extraordinary Form. In the Ukrainian Greek Catholic Church, the Feast of Our Mother of Perpetual Help is observed on the first Sunday in July, with Festal propers added to the Divine Liturgy.

== Restoration and carbon dating ==
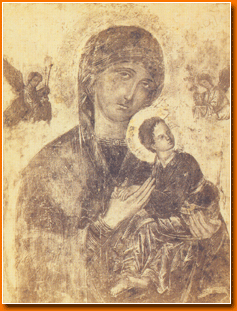
Photograph of the icon prior to its restoration in 1866

Pope Pius IX tasked the Dean of the College of Cardinals, Costantino Patrizi Naro to restore the worn and damaged image on 26 April 1866. The icon underwent restoration by the Polish painter Leopold Nowotny (1822–1870).

In 1990, the icon was taken down from its altar for new photography and image restoration commissioned by the General Government of Redemptorists. The Redemptorist Order entered into contract with the Technical Department at the Vatican Museum to restore the icon and prevent further fungal damage to the icon. (Note: The trailer for the documentary, Icon of Love: An Incredible Story of a Precious Image, shows the condition of the icon before the 1992 restoration.) The restoration process involved X-ray, infrared scanning, technical analysis of the paint and ultra-violet testing along with a carbon-14-test which placed the icon between the year 1325–1480. Artistic analysis of the icon revealed that the facial structure of the icon was altered due to previous overpainting, resulting in a combination of "oriental and occidental" features of the image.

== Composition of the image ==
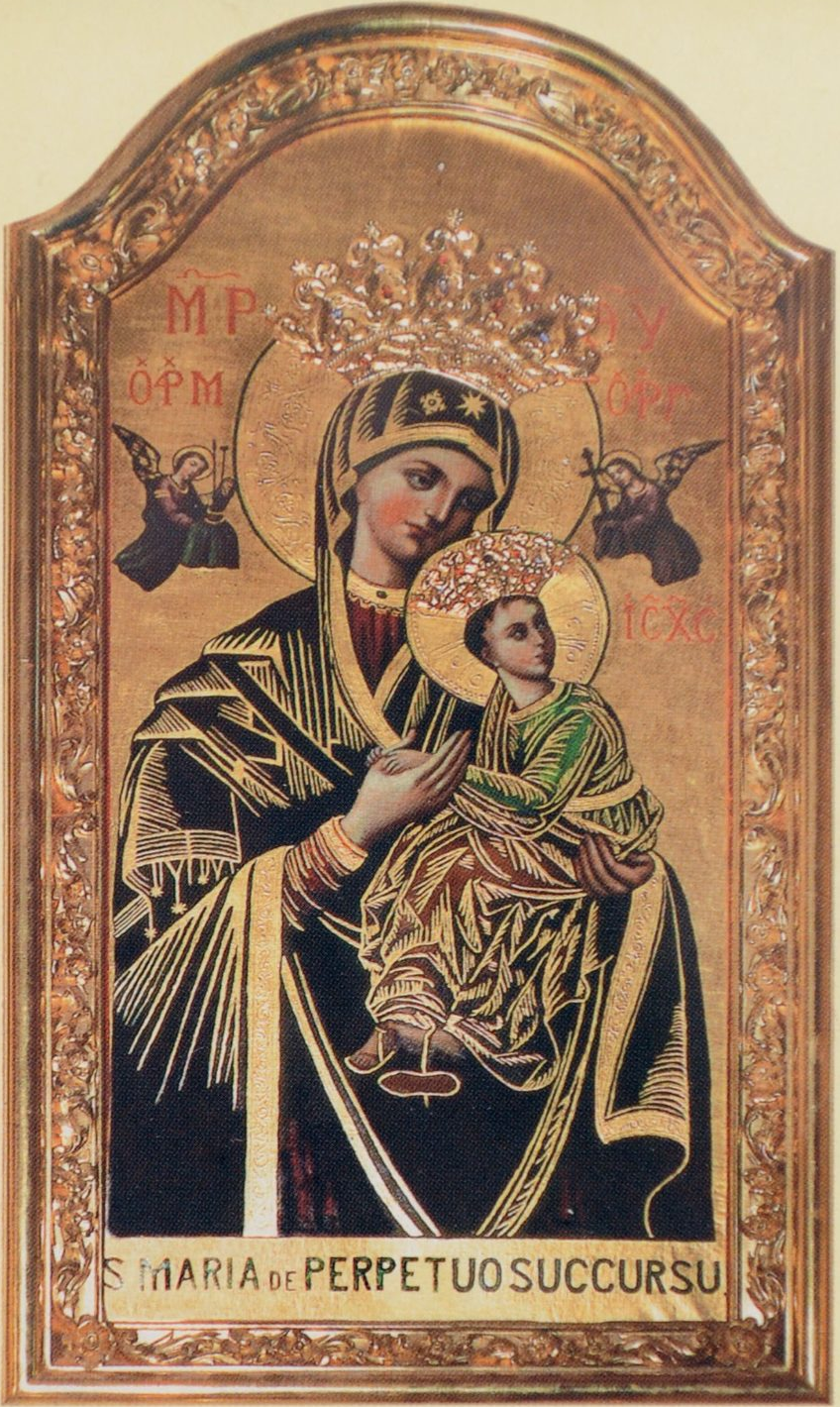
The namesake icon crowned by Pope John Paul II via the decree Una Altra Volta for Wadowice, Poland on 16 June 1999. The Chapel of the Holy Cross, inside the Minor Basilica of the Holy Presentation of the Blessed Virgin Mary.

The original wooden icon is suspended on the altar, measures 17" × 21" inches, on a wood panel with a gold leaf background. The image depicts the following symbols:

- The Blessed Virgin Mary – wearing a dress of dark red, in Byzantine iconography the color of the Empress.
- The subject shows Mary looking towards the faithful while pointing at the Child Jesus, frightened by the instruments of crucifixion and is depicted with a fallen sandal.
- The left side is Saint Michael Archangel – carrying the lance and sponge of the crucifixion of Jesus.
- On the right side is Saint Gabriel Archangel carrying a 3-bar cross and nails.
- The Virgin Mary has a star on her forehead signifying her role as Star of the Sea while the cross on the side has been claimed as referring to the Greek monastery which produced the icon.

Byzantine depictions of the Blessed Virgin Mary in art have three stars, one star each on the shoulder and one on the forehead. This type of icon is called Hodegetria, where Mary is pointing to her Son, known as a Theotokos of the Passion.

The Greek inscriptions read MP-ΘΥ (Μήτηρ Θεοῦ, Mother of God), ΟΑΜ (Ὁ Ἀρχάγγελος Μιχαήλ, Michael the Archangel), ΟΑΓ (Ὁ Ἀρχάγγελος Γαβριήλ, Gabriel the Archangel) and IC-XC (Ἰησοῦς Χριστός, Jesus Christ), respectively.

The icon has a gold ground on a walnut panel, believed to be from Crete. The Cretan school was the source of the many icons imported into Europe from the late Middle Ages through the Renaissance. The gold background represents the Kingdom of God. The round halo surrounding the Virgin Mary's head as well as details on the robes were created through Estofado, which is an artistic effect created by scraping the paint to reveal the gold background, additional effects are achieved by chasing designs on the gold. The icon was cleaned and restored once in 1866 and again in the year 1940.

== Veneration ==
=== India ===
On 8 September 1948, the Perpetual Succour Novena was started at St. Michael's Church, Mumbai, India. Father Edward Fernandes brought back with him a copy of the image for public devotion from Ireland. The widespread devotion continues today in multiple dialects and languages at the shrine.

=== The Philippines ===
Our Lady of Perpetual Help is widely venerated by Filipino Catholics and overseas Filipino communities. A German copy of the icon is venerated in the National Shrine of Our Mother of Perpetual Help in Baclaran, Parañaque City—the country's centre of devotion to the icon. Since 1958, the Church has been authorized to remain open 24 hours a day. Cardinal Karol Józef Wojtyła offered a Catholic Mass at the shrine in February 1973 and later visited the country again as Pope John Paul II on 17 February 1981.

The icon has become a ubiquitous symbol of Philippine religiosity similar to the archetype of the Last Supper in a Filipino dining room, and is even sometimes caricatured in cultural satire. Copies can be found in many Catholic churches and chapels, often enshrined in a side altar or the narthex, as well as countless houses, businesses, and even public utility vehicles.

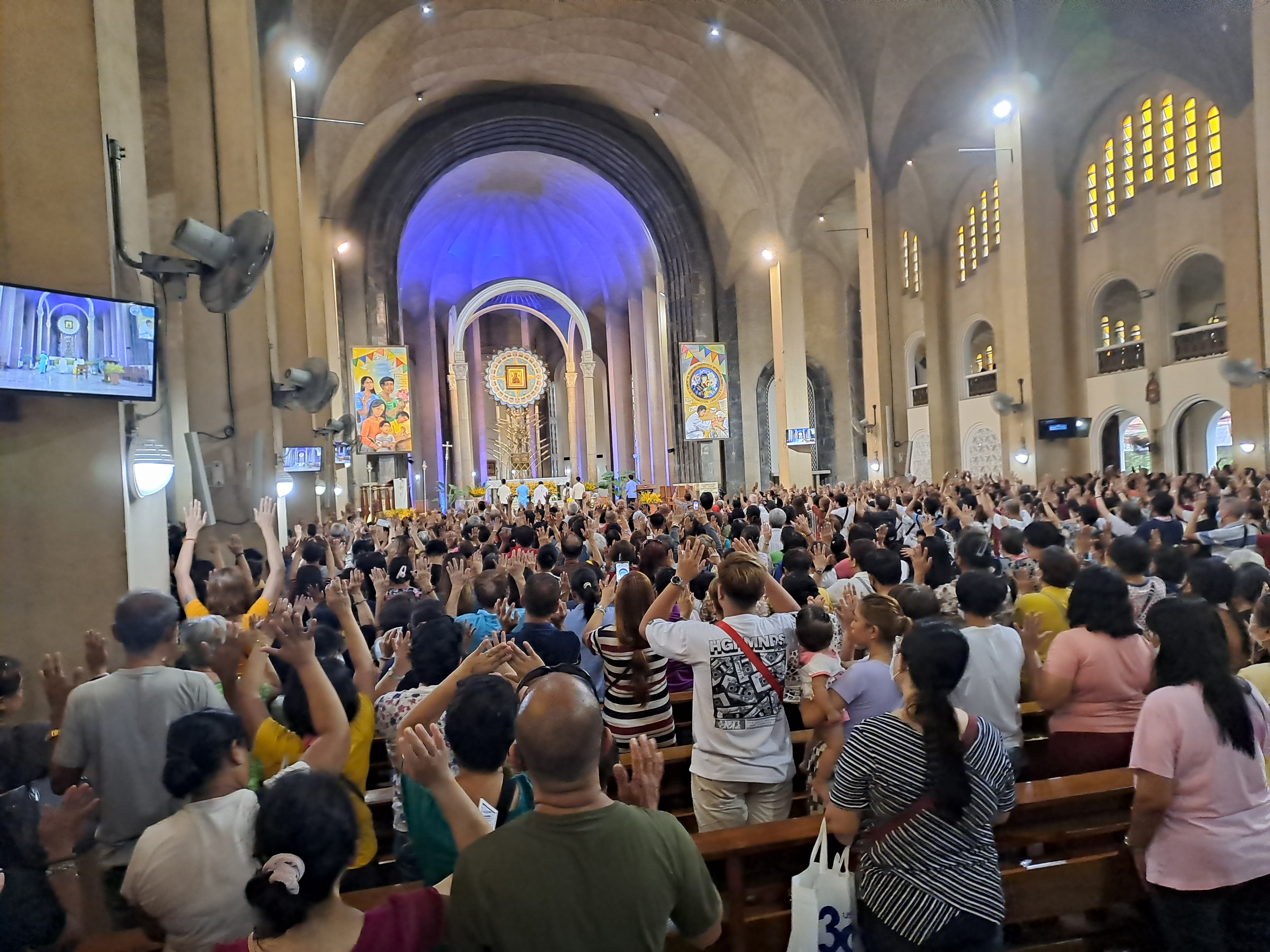
The Wednesday Novena at Baclaran Church draws thousands of devotees.

Every Wednesday, congregations hold services where they publicly recite the rosary and the icon's associated novena, and if possible with a priest delivering Benediction and celebrating a votive Mass in its honor. Devotees today still use the same Novena booklet first published by Irish Redemptorists, who introduced the icon and its devotion to the Philippines in the early 1900s. The Filipino Diaspora continue keeping the Wednesday Novena, holding novena services in their respective parishes overseas.

In Saint John the Baptist Church, Garcia Hernandez, Bohol, the feast of the image is held on 27 April instead of the usual liturgical date. The 48 sub-chapels in the parish participate in the annual feast, while every 27th of the month has each chapel's respective congregations holding a procession of the icon. This form of devotion began in 1923 when two missionary priests, a Dutchman named Thomas and a German named Jorge, brought the icon to the town. The original icon can still be seen in a chapel of the parish; its reverse bears a Latin inscription attesting to its dedication.

=== Singapore ===
The center of devotion to Our Mother of Perpetual Help is the Church of Saint Alphonsus, known locally as the Novena Church due to popular services that take place every Saturday. Beginning in 1949, pilgrims have been coming each week to give praise to the Mother of God and every week there are many prayers of petition and prayers of thanksgiving received. Each week, the Redemptorists offer six novena prayer services—five in English and one in Mandarin.

=== Ukraine ===
Devotion to the Mother of God of Perpetual Help was propagated by the Greek Catholic Redemptorists, who arrived in Ukraine in 1913 at the invitation of Metropolitan Andrew Sheptytsky.

Hieromartyr Nicholas Charnetsky and Hieromartyr Vasyl Velychkovsky were devoted to the Mother of God of Perpetual Help. Charnetsky was ordained on 8 February 1931 in the presence of the original icon in Rome and died while invoking the aid of the Mother of God of Perpetual Help. Velychkovsky wrote a book about the icon titled, A History of the Miraculous Icon of our Mother of Perpetual Help in 1968, for the centennial of the public veneration of the icon in 1866.

The city of Lviv had two crowned copies of Mother of God of Perpetual Help at one time. The first, crowned on 30 October 1927, was taken to Poland on 14 October 1945 and placed in the chapel of the theological seminary in Warsaw. The second, crowned on 25 June 1939, was taken to Poland in 1943. It is now kept at the Carmelite monastery in Kalisz-Niedźwiady. This copy was crowned a second time on 7 June 1991, by Pope John Paul II.

An akathist composed by Roman Bachtalowsky, CSsR, was published in 1931.

Another copy of the Perpetual Help icon was kept in the Redemptorist monastery in Lviv. In 1939, a Soviet soldier entered the monastery chapel and shot at the icon. The bullet pierced the board just above the head of the Christ Child. The soldier would later be shot and killed by a bullet of unknown origin. The icon was kept hidden during the years of persecution. On 7 April 2009, the icon was translated to the Greek Catholic church of Saint Josaphat, where the relics of Nicholas Charnetsky are enshrined.

On 24 June 2015, a copy of the Mother of God of Perpetual Help was blessed by Pope Francis and brought to Ukraine on pilgrimage.

On 11 December 2017, Major Archbishop Sviatoslav Shevchuk proclaimed that the Ukrainian Greek Catholic Church will celebrate the feast day of the Mother of God of Perpetual Help each year on the first Sunday of July.

=== United States ===
The Redemptorist parish, Saint Mary's in Annapolis, Maryland, received a copy of the icon from Rome in 1868. The image is prominently displayed within the sanctuary of the parish.

In 1878, the Basilica and Shrine of Our Lady of Perpetual Help in Boston, Massachusetts, obtained a certified copy of the icon being the first in the United States.

Between 1927 and 1935, the first American novena service dedicated to the icon was recited in Saint Alphonsus "The Rock" church in St. Louis, Missouri, and various other Redemptorist stations around the United States.

There is a shrine Church of the Most Holy Redeemer in Manhattan; and at the Basilica of Our Lady of Perpetual Help (Brooklyn) and Ybor City, Tampa, Florida.

== Patronage ==
The town of Almoradí in the Valencian Country of Spain invokes the patronage of Our Mother of Perpetual Help. In 1918, the son of the Marquis of Ríoflorido, José Carlos, fell ill with pleurisy. His mother, Lady Desamparado Fontes, fed him a silk fabric cloth touched to the icon of Perpetual Help in Rome, which resulted in instantaneous healing later claimed to be miraculous. As a token of thanksgiving, Fontes officially donated funds to begin the Confraternity of Almoradí. On 29 May 1919, Our Lady of Perpetual Help was officially enthroned in Saint Andrew's Parish as the official patroness of the town. In 1945, Pope Pius XII confirmed this patronage by a pontifical decree. On its 50th anniversary in 1969, a public diocesan coronation of this image was held, directed by the town mayor and its authorities, with the crowns made by Santero artist José David.

Our Lady of Perpetual Help is also the principal patroness of Haiti. According to Catholic bishop Guy Sansaricq, former Haitian president Élie Lescot and his cabinet petitioned the Holy See to make Our Mother of Perpetual Help the Patroness of Haiti in 1942. Many Haitians credit the Virgin Mary under this title with performing miracles to prevent a smallpox outbreak which ravaged the country in 1882. The Holy See approved the request for patronage under the Pontificate of Pope Pius XII. Our Lady of Perpetual Help is also present in numerous Haitian public stamps used by the Office des Postes d'Haiti. In January 2010, Pope Benedict XVI invoked Our Lady of Perpetual Help for Haiti's earthquake relief through Archbishop Louis Kébreau.

Our Lady of Perpetual Help is also the patroness of the Diocese of Salina, Kansas in the United States, of the Diocese of Middlesbrough and the Diocese of Leeds in England, the Diocese of Wilcannia–Forbes in Rural Australia, and of the Diocese of Issele-Uku in Nigeria.

== See also ==
- Virgin of Mercy
- Titles of Mary
