= Baclaran =

Barangay in Parañaque, Metro Manila, Philippines

- Barangay
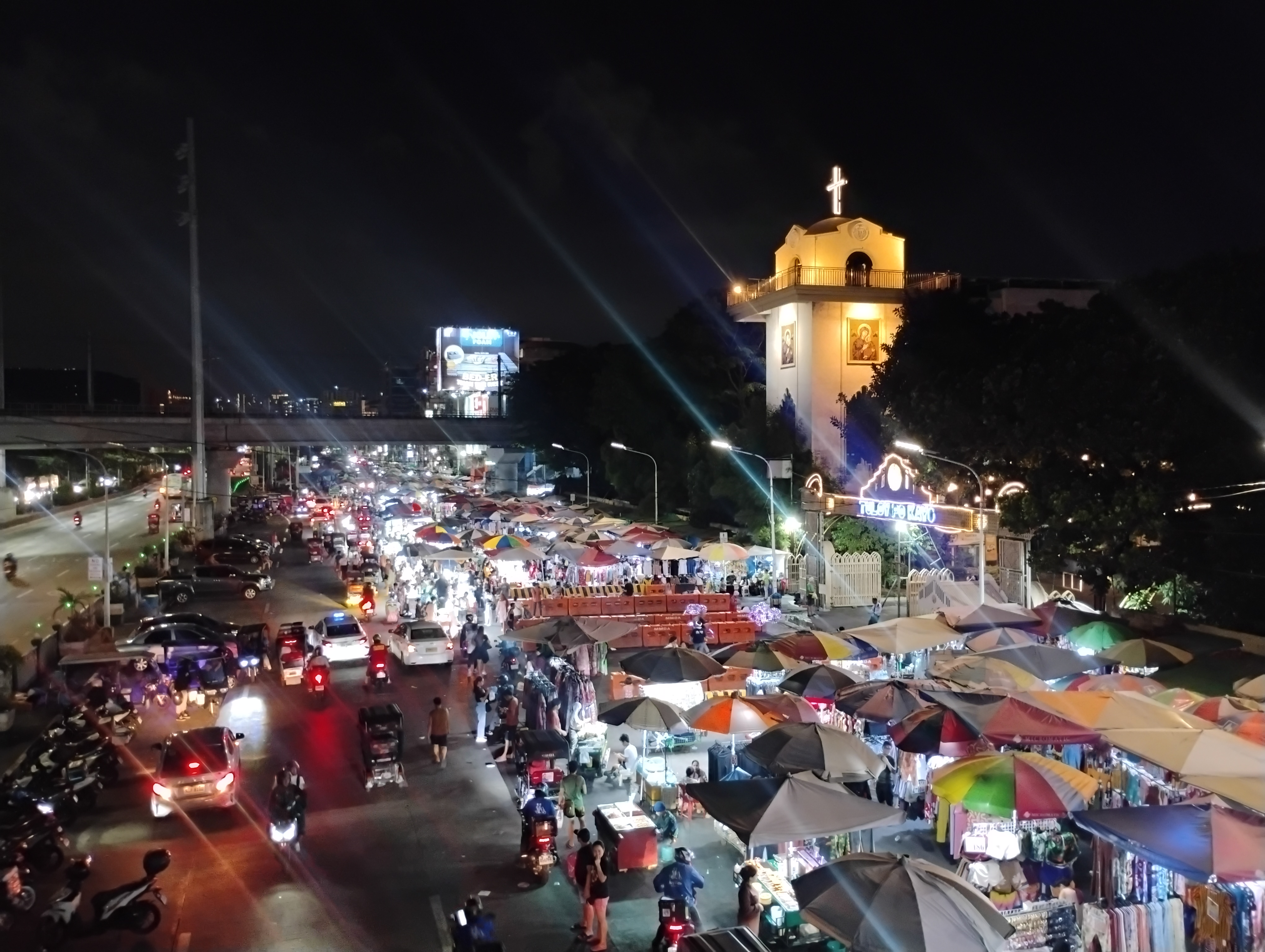
- Baclaran at night
- Interactive map of Baclaran
- Location within Metro Manila
- Coordinates: 14°31′55″N 120°59′39″E
- Country: Philippines
- Region: National Capital Region
- City: Parañaque
- District: 1st Legislative District of Parañaque
- Established: 1971

Government
  - Type: Barangay
  - Barangay Captain: Julius Anthony Zaide
  - Sangguniang Barangay: Kagawad: Vincent Ace Mangosing; Wilmer Agnas; Joseph Oliver Lim; Carlito Vacal; Romulo Fernandez; Carlito Gabriel

Area
  - Total: 0.6372 km^{2} (0.2460 sq mi)

Population (2020)
  - Total: 33,850
  - Density: 53,120/km^{2} (137,600/sq mi)
- Time zone: UTC+8 (PST)
- Postal Code: 1702
- Area code: 02
- Patron Saint: St. Rita of Cascia

Baclaran is a barangay located in the northern area of the city of Parañaque, Metro Manila, Philippines. It is also known to be located at the borders of the cities of Parañaque and Pasay.

Because of its proximity to the shore of Manila Bay, the place was named after a piece of fishing equipment called "baklad". Baklad is a rattan fence placed around the fish to protect them until they are ready to be sold in the market. Many of these baklads were assembled at the seashore, so people started calling the place "Bakladan". The Filipino grammatical feature of changing d's to r's when a suffix is added changed this to "Baclaran".

== History ==
Then a barrio, Baclaran was excised, alongside barrio Tambo, from the then-municipality of Parañaque to form part of the newly established municipality of Baclaran in 1965, when both municipalities were part of Rizal province. However, the Supreme Court of the Philippines later voided the creation of the new municipality, thus returning the aforementioned barrios to Parañaque.

Baclaran was established in 1971 in the municipality, now city, of Parañaque. It was later converted into a barangay alongside all other barrios in the Philippines in 1974.

In 1973, Cardinal Karol Józef Wojtyła (later Pope John Paul II), then the Archbishop of Kraków, visited the Baclaran Church and celebrated Mass there during a brief, unofficial stopover in Manila, which was his first visit to the Philippines. In 1981, Wojtyła as Pope John Paul II returned to the shrine as part of his apostolic visit to the Philippines.

The area is well known for the National Shrine of Our Mother of Perpetual Help, also known as the Redemptorist Church or Baclaran Church, dedicated to Our Mother of Perpetual Help. The first Wednesday of every month is dedicated to the shrine of Our Lady of Perpetual Help. There was also once Muslim mosque, the Baclaran Mosque, now demolished by the City of Pasay. Baclaran is known for its children and youth membership in the local rondalla, which won at NAMCYA in 1996, and the Drum and Lyre Band, as well as its street welding. There are a number of tiangges (flea markets) occupying the westbound lane of Taft Avenue.

Baclaran officially expanded its boundary westward into the Bay City reclamation area on July 26, 2026, after voters ratified Parañaque City Ordinance No. 2023-19 that implements a straight-line boundary approach. It particularly covers the portion of the Aseana City development north of Asean Avenue.

== Demographics ==
Year	Population
2007	26,159
2010	21,332
2015	28,385
2020	33,850
2024	35,290

== Transportation ==
Located near the intersection of Epifanio de los Santos Avenue and Roxas Boulevard, Baclaran is a major transportation hub and transfer point. Redemptorist station of Manila Light Rail Transit System Line 1 Cavite Extension is located in the barangay, while the Baclaran station, the line's former southern terminal station in Pasay, serves the barangay. Many bus and jeepney routes pass through Baclaran or have it as their end destination, especially transportation to and from the province of Cavite to the south. Baclaran also has the closest street near the four terminals of Ninoy Aquino International Airport, more known as the Airport Road. Wednesdays are generally busier as novena devotees come to pray at the Baclaran Church.

Cycle rickshaws can also be used to navigate the interior streets.
