= Baclaran Church =

Roman Catholic church in Parañaque, Philippines

- National Shrine of Our Mother of Perpetual Help
- Redemptorist Church
- Pambansáng Dambana ng Iná ng Laging Saklolo (Filipino); Santuario Nacional de Nuestra Señora del Perpetuo Socorro (Spanish)
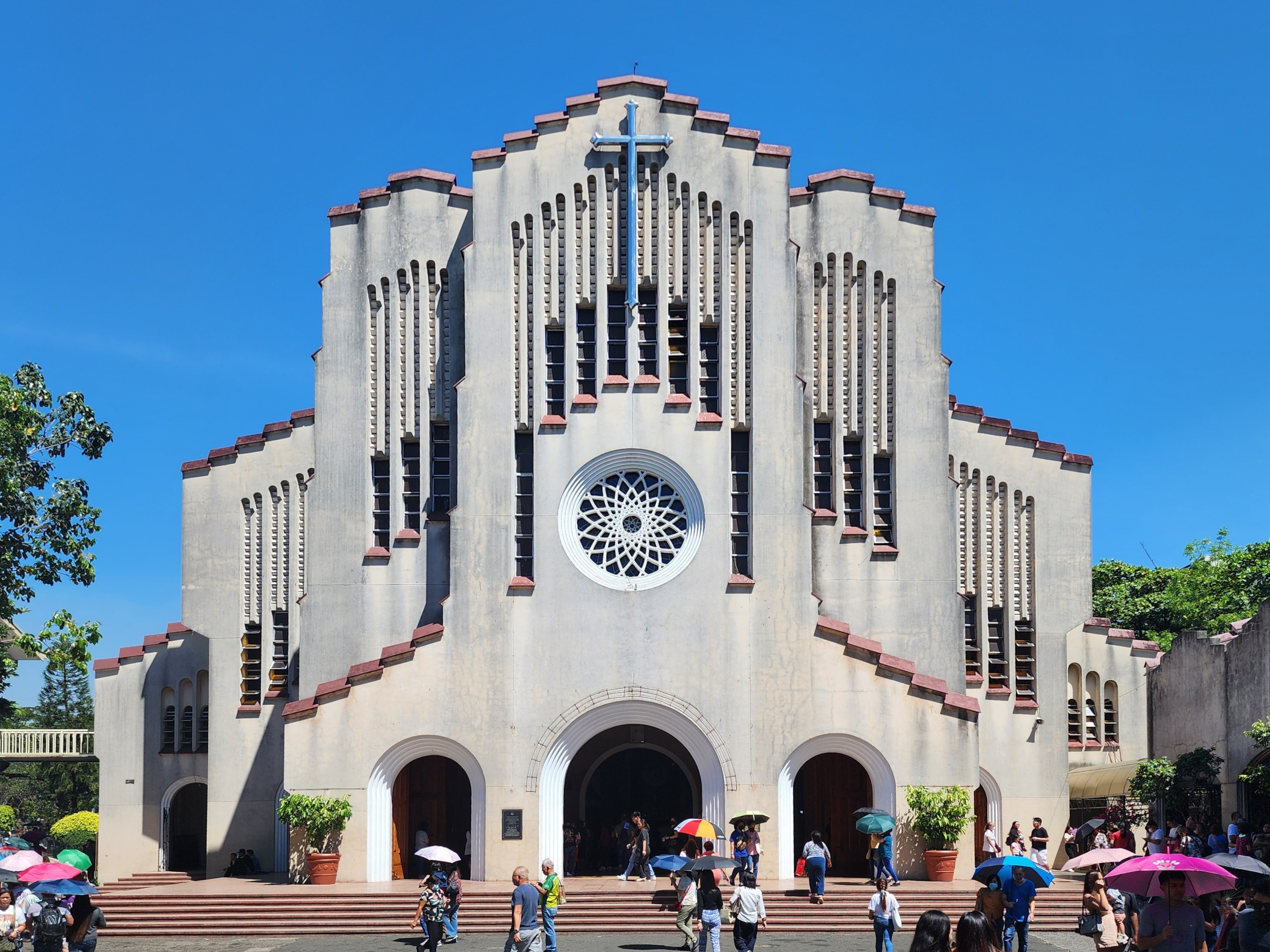
- Church façade in March 2024
- Baclaran Church
- 14°31′53″N 120°59′43″E
- Location: Parañaque, Metro Manila
- Country: Philippines
- Language(s): Filipino, English
- Denomination: Roman Catholic
- Religious institute: Redemptorists
- Website: Baclaran Church

History
- Status: National shrine
- Dedication: Our Mother of Perpetual Help
- Consecrated: December 1, 1958; 67 years ago

Architecture
- Functional status: Active
- Heritage designation: Important Cultural Property
- Designated: June 27, 2023
- Architect: César Homero R. Concio Sr.
- Architectural type: Church
- Style: Modern Romanesque
- Groundbreaking: January 11, 1953; 73 years ago
- Completed: December 5, 1958; 67 years ago

Specifications
- Capacity: 11,000: 2,000 sitting; 9,000 standing
- Length: 110 m (350 ft)
- Width: 36 m (118 ft)
- Height: 22 m (71 ft)
- Materials: Adobe, steel, cement

Administration
- Province: Manila
- Diocese: Parañaque
- Deanery: Sta. Rita de Cascia
- Parish: Our Mother of Perpetual Help

Clergy
- Rector: Rico John Bilangel, CSsR

The National Shrine of Our Mother of Perpetual Help, also known as the Redemptorist Church (Spanish: Iglesia Redentorista) and colloquially as Baclaran Church (Filipino: Simbahan ng Baclaran), is a national shrine dedicated to Our Lady of Perpetual Help along Roxas Boulevard in Baclaran, Parañaque city of Metro Manila, Philippines. It is under the jurisdiction of the Roman Catholic Diocese of Parañaque. The church enshrines the icon of Our Mother of Perpetual Help, and is one of the largest Marian churches in the Philippines.

Devotion to Our Mother of Perpetual Help is popular amongst Filipino Catholics, who flood the church on Wednesdays to attend Mass and pray the Novena to Our Mother of Perpetual Help. In Manila, Wednesdays are popularly called "Baclaran Day" due to congested roads near the shrine. The original icon enshrined above the main altar came from Germany before priests of the Redemptorist Order brought it to what was then the United States territory of the Philippine Islands in 1906. Since 1958, the shrine has been authorised by the Holy See to remain open 24 hours a day throughout the year.

The wider shrine complex also serves as the headquarters of the Manila Vice Province of Congregation of the Most Holy Redeemer, while the Cebu Province of the Redemptorists is headquartered in Cebu. The shrine's current rector is Rico John Bilangel. The shrine celebrates its annual feast day on June 27, the liturgical feast day of the icon. The Bantayog ng mga Desaparecido, dedicated to victims of the brutal Marcos dictatorship and located on shrine grounds, was inscribed in 2019 in the CIPDH-UNESCO Memorias Situadas, which maps international sites of memory linked to serious human rights violations.

== History ==
The shrine and its attached convent were initially dedicated to Saint Thérèse of Lisieux; a grotto statue of the saint on the shrine grounds memorializes her patronage.

The first Redemptorists came to the Philippines in 1906 and set up a community at Opon, Cebu. The Redemptorist community arrived in Manila and settled in Malate in 1913, where they built a small, popular shrine to Our Mother of Perpetual Help. By 1932, the community moved south to the Baclaran neighbourhood of Pasay. Denis Grogan, the builder, was devoted to Saint Thérèse of Lisieux and made her patroness of the new church and parish house. However, the Ynchaustí family, longtime supporters and friends, donated a high altar on the condition that it enshrine the icon of Our Mother of Perpetual Help. When the church opened, the shrine became very popular.

During the Japanese occupation of the Philippines during the Second World War, invading Imperial Japanese troops overran the church, and the priests dispersed. Australian and New Zealander priests were interred in the concentration camp at University of the Philippines – Los Baños. The icon was meanwhile removed from the church and given to a family for safekeeping; their home was later burned and ransacked towards the end of the Occupation. The icon was initially thought lost until a De La Salle brother found it among other valuable objects that the Japanese had seized and abandoned at the Old Bilibid prison in Manila's Quiapo district.

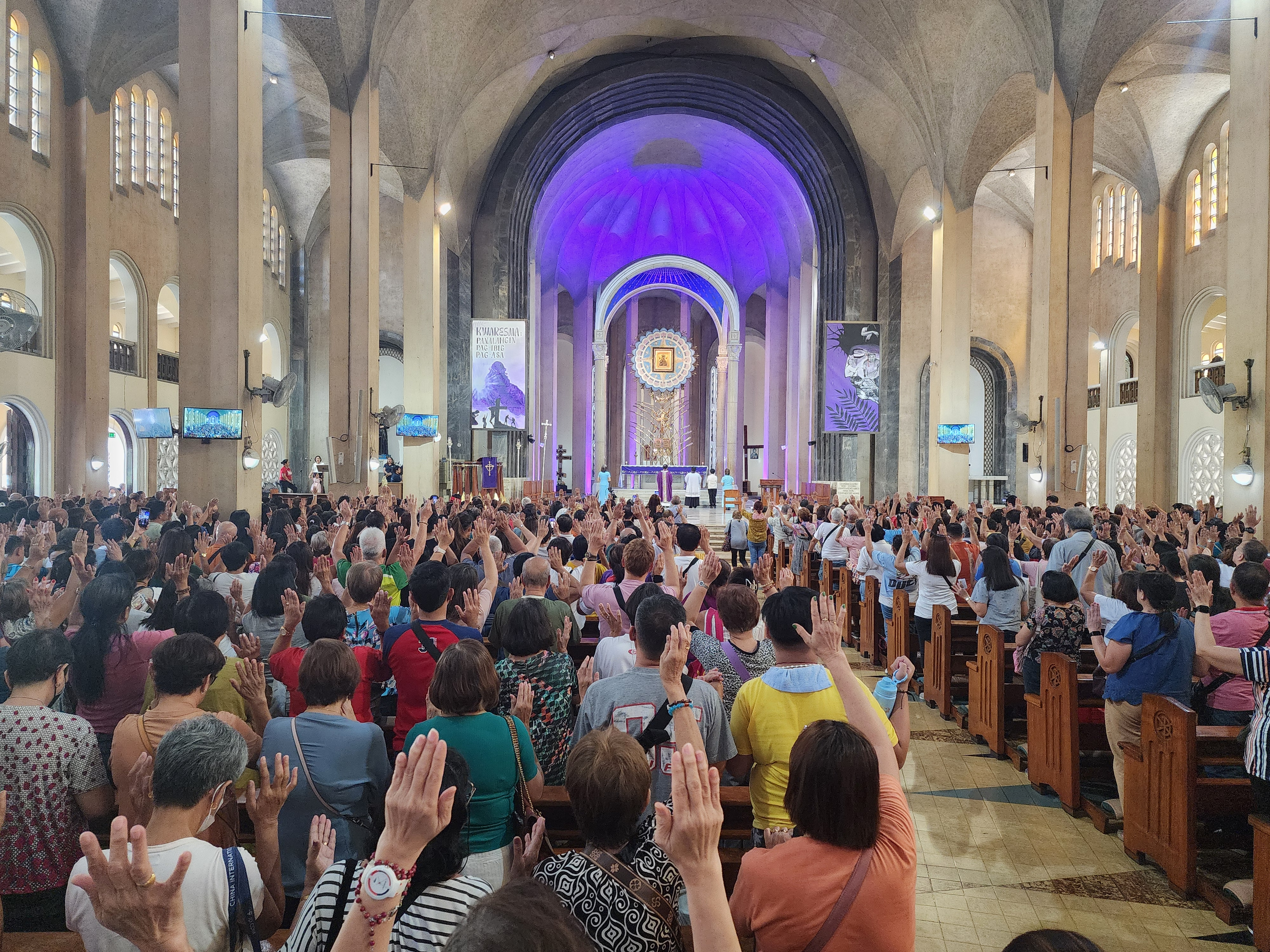
The Wednesday Novena in the church draws thousands of devotees.

Contrary to popular belief, the Perpetual Help Novena did not originate in Baclaran, but at the Redemptorist Church dedicated to Saint Clement Hofbauer in La Paz, Iloilo City, first held on May 6, 1946. After witnessing the devotion of Ilonggos to the icon, the Australian Redemptorist Gerard O'Donnell introduced the novena to Baclaran. Linguist Leo J. English conducted the first Baclaran Novena with 70 participants on Wednesday, June 23, 1948, giving rise to Wednesday's local moniker of "Baclaran Day".

The present Modern Romanesque church is the third to be built on the same site. It was designed by architect César Concio. It took six years to build because most of the money came from small donations—the suggestion from the pulpit was 10 Philippine centavos per week—that often ran out, requiring construction to stop. The foundation stone was laid on January 11, 1953, and on December 1, 1958, the new church was consecrated. The church was dedicated on December 5, 1958, and has been open 24 hours ever since.

In February 1973, Archbishop of Kraków Cardinal Karol Wojtyła offered Mass at the shrine during a brief, unofficial stopover in Manila. On February 17, 1981, he returned as Pope John Paul II for his first Apostolic Visit to the country.

The shrine was notably the refuge of several computer engineers from the Commission on Elections (COMELEC) during the controversial 1986 Snap Elections. Thirty-five technicians who were operating the COMELEC's electronic quick count staged a walkout from their headquarters at the Philippine International Convention Center to protest alleged electoral fraud by supporters of dictator President Ferdinand Marcos. Marcos's wife, Imelda, was a benefactress of the shrine and devotee, having often brought her children there to perform the Visita Iglesia during Holy Week.

In 2015, a detached belfry was built as part of the shrine's redevelopment plan. The structure, which houses a 24-bell carillon cast by the Grassmayr Bell Foundry in Innsbruck, was blessed on September 8 that same year by Cardinal Luis Antonio Tagle, then-Archbishop of Manila. It was the first time the shrine had a bell tower since it was built. The carillon bells are automatically programmed to ring 15 minutes before every Mass or Novena service.

On September 5, 2019, the original icon was brought down from the altar for restoration and was returned upon completion on November 27 of the same year.

On June 27, 2023, the feast day of Our Mother of Perpetual Help, the shrine was declared an Important Cultural Property by the National Museum of the Philippines.

== Architecture ==
The Modern Romanesque building has a full seating capacity of 2,000, but as many as 11,000 people (including those standing) can fit inside during Masses. The baldachin, made of marble, serves as the shrine's centrepiece and is where the icon is enshrined. The ceiling design is patterned after two hands joined in prayer.

The belfry, which has mosaics of the icon on its four faces, is built closer to Roxas Boulevard some distance from the shrine. It is topped by a finial in the shape of a simplified Redemptorist coat-of-arms, particularly the Cross, Spear, and sponge on a stick of hyssop. It also housed the Sinirangan coffee shop at its base until the COVID-19 pandemic, and presently has the Perpetual Help Center and Souvenir Shop.

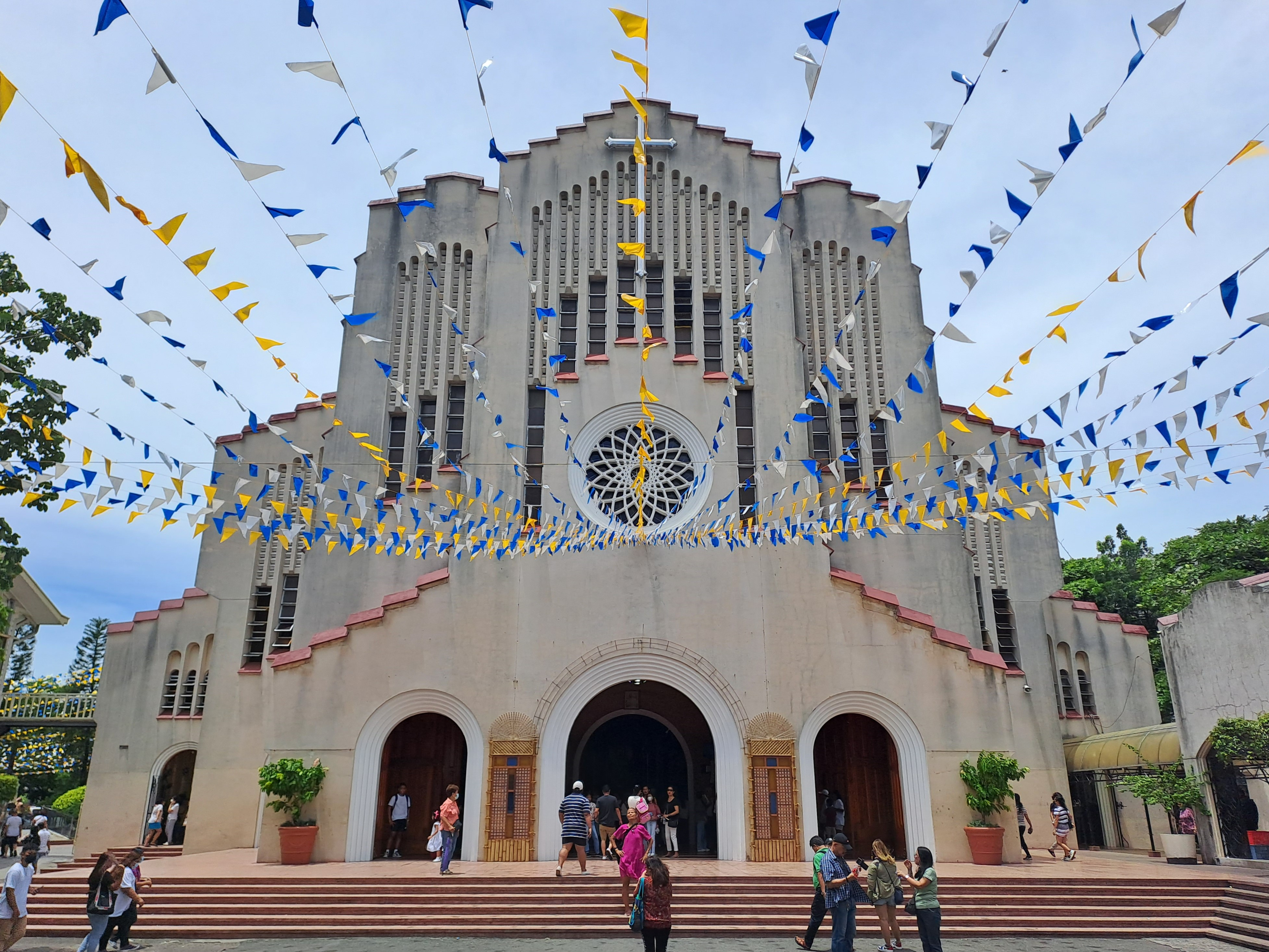
Main façade in June 2023, for the diamond jubilee of the first Baclaran Novena

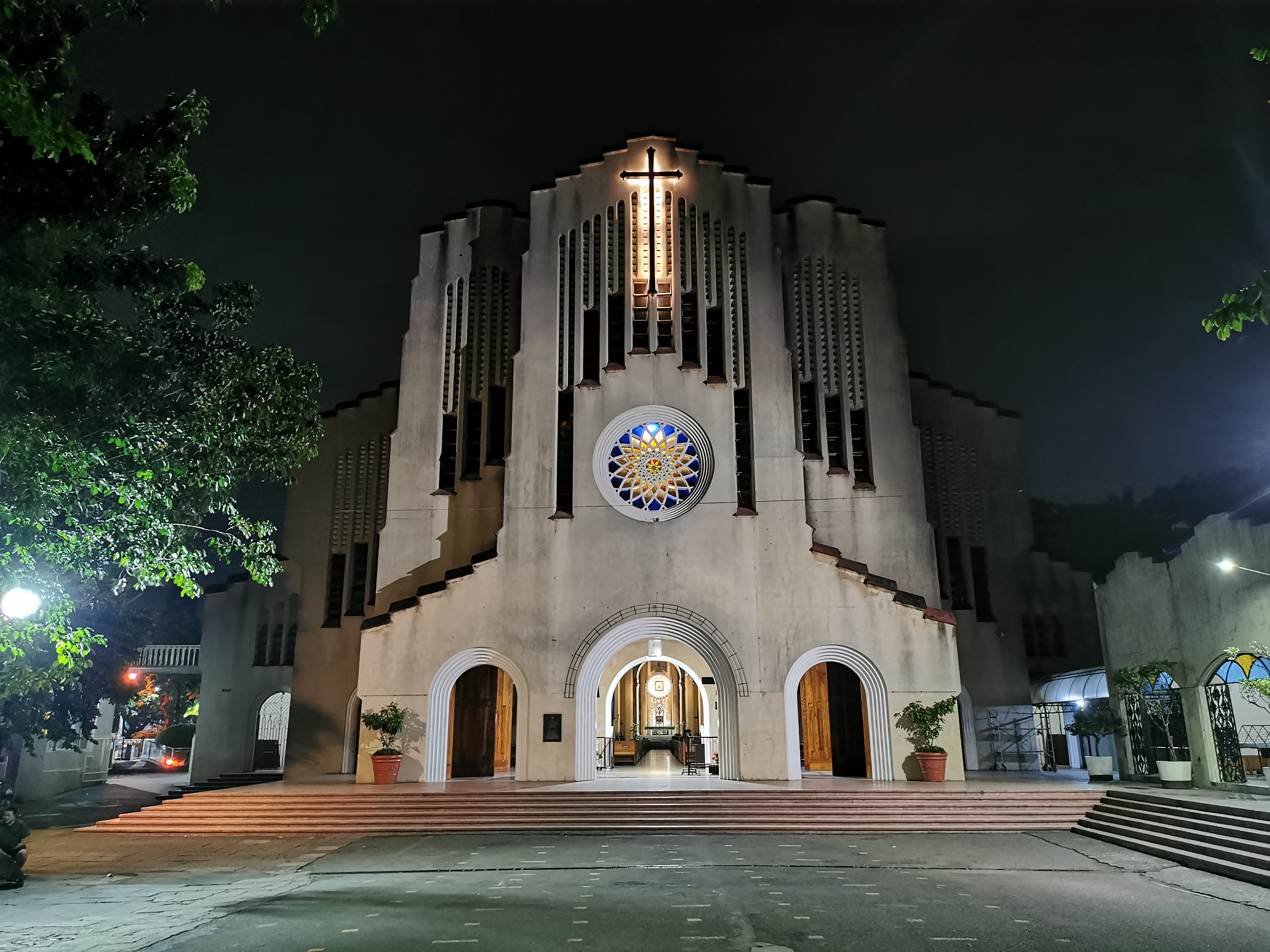
Façade at night

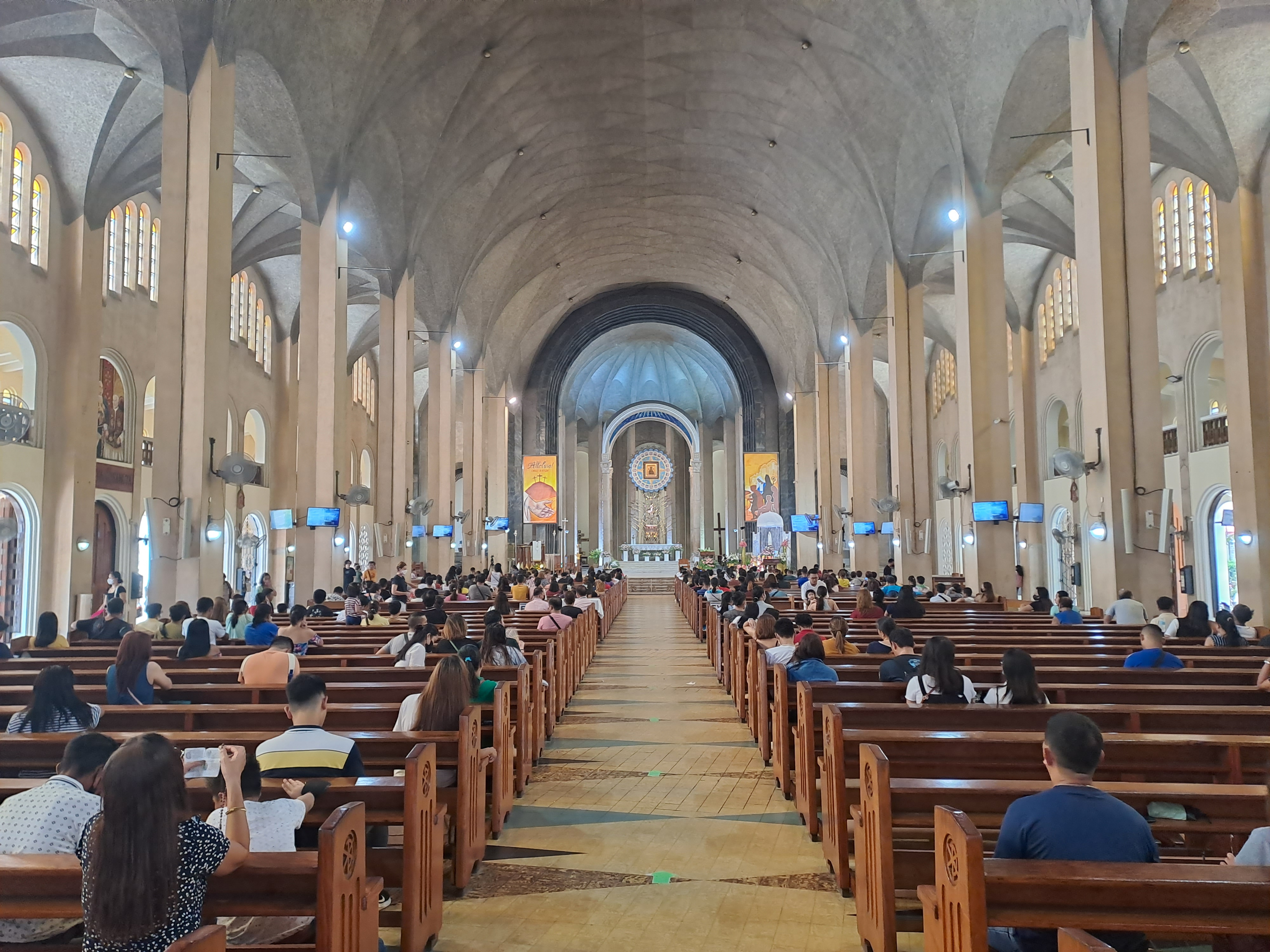
The nave in 2023

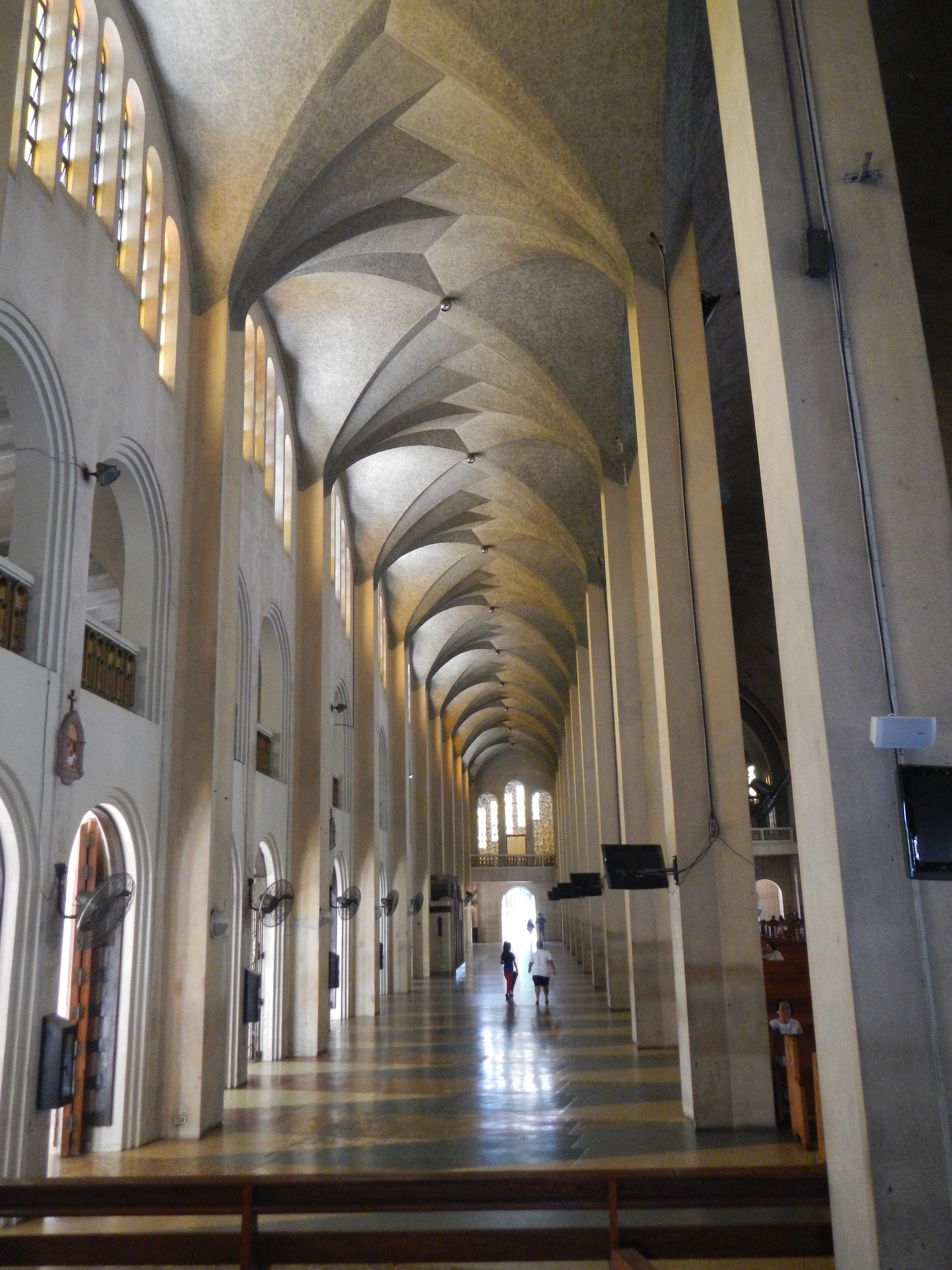
One of the church's side aisles

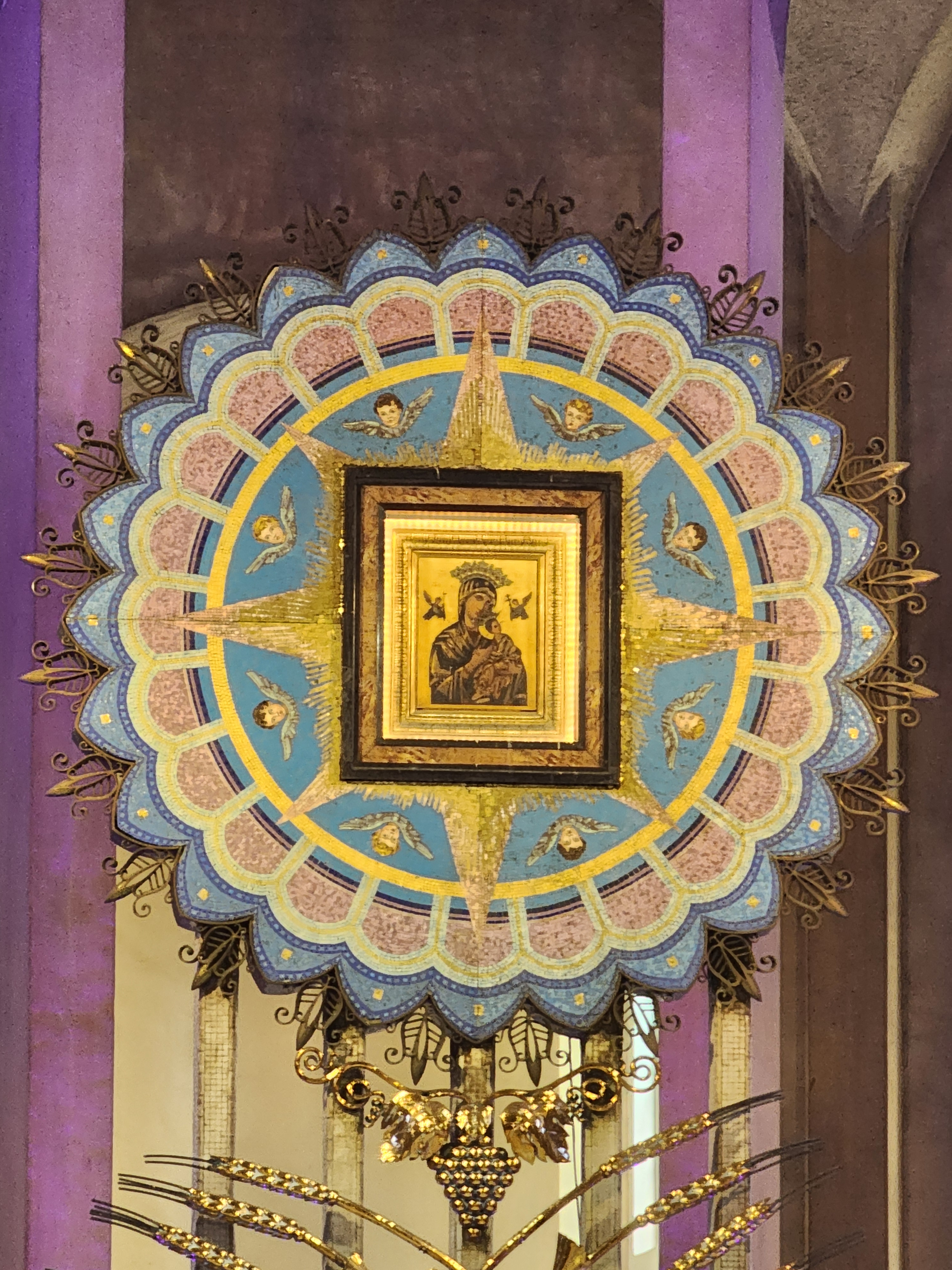
The icon in its mosaic frame, enshrined above the high altar

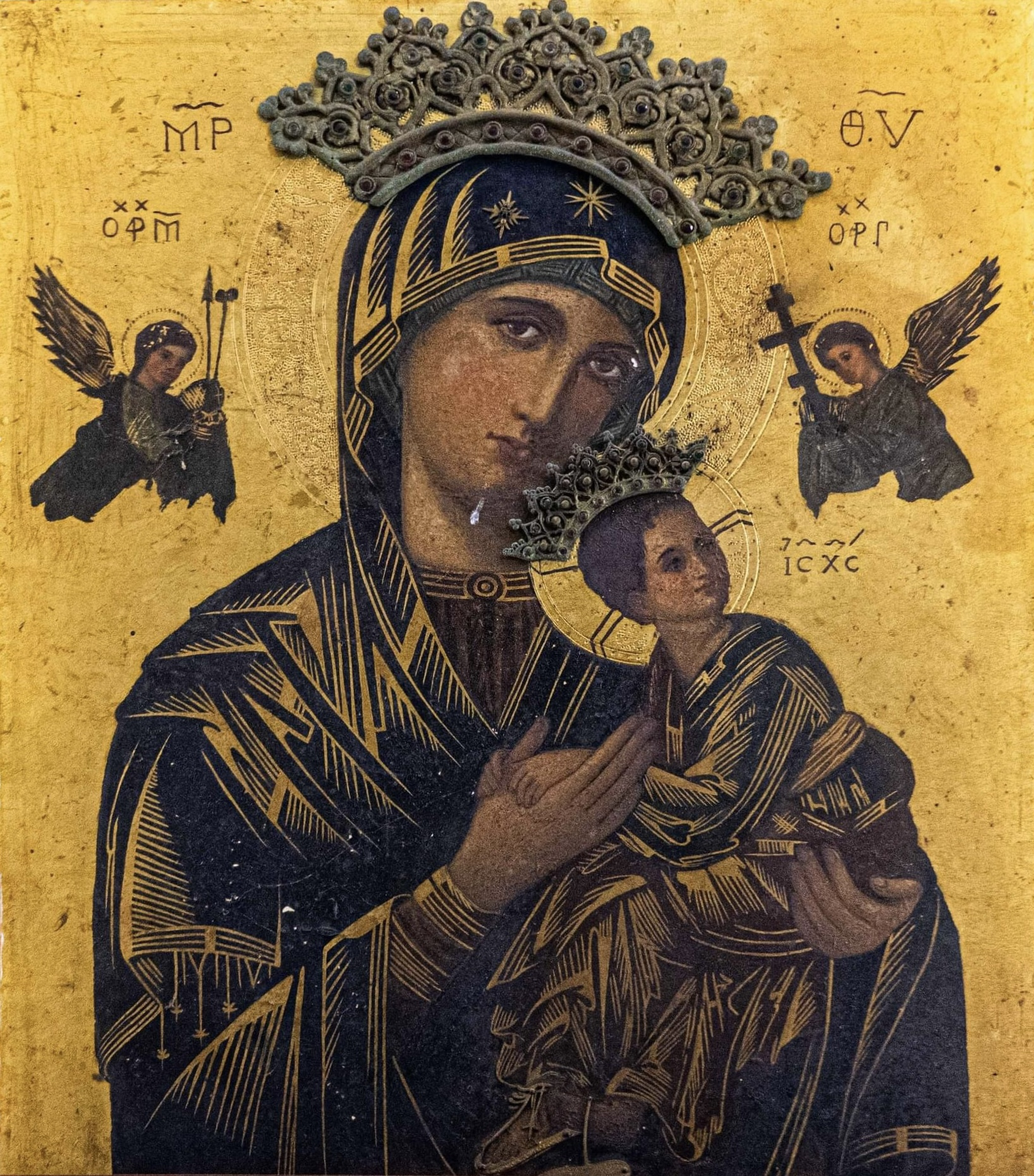
A close-up view of the actual icon enshrined in the church

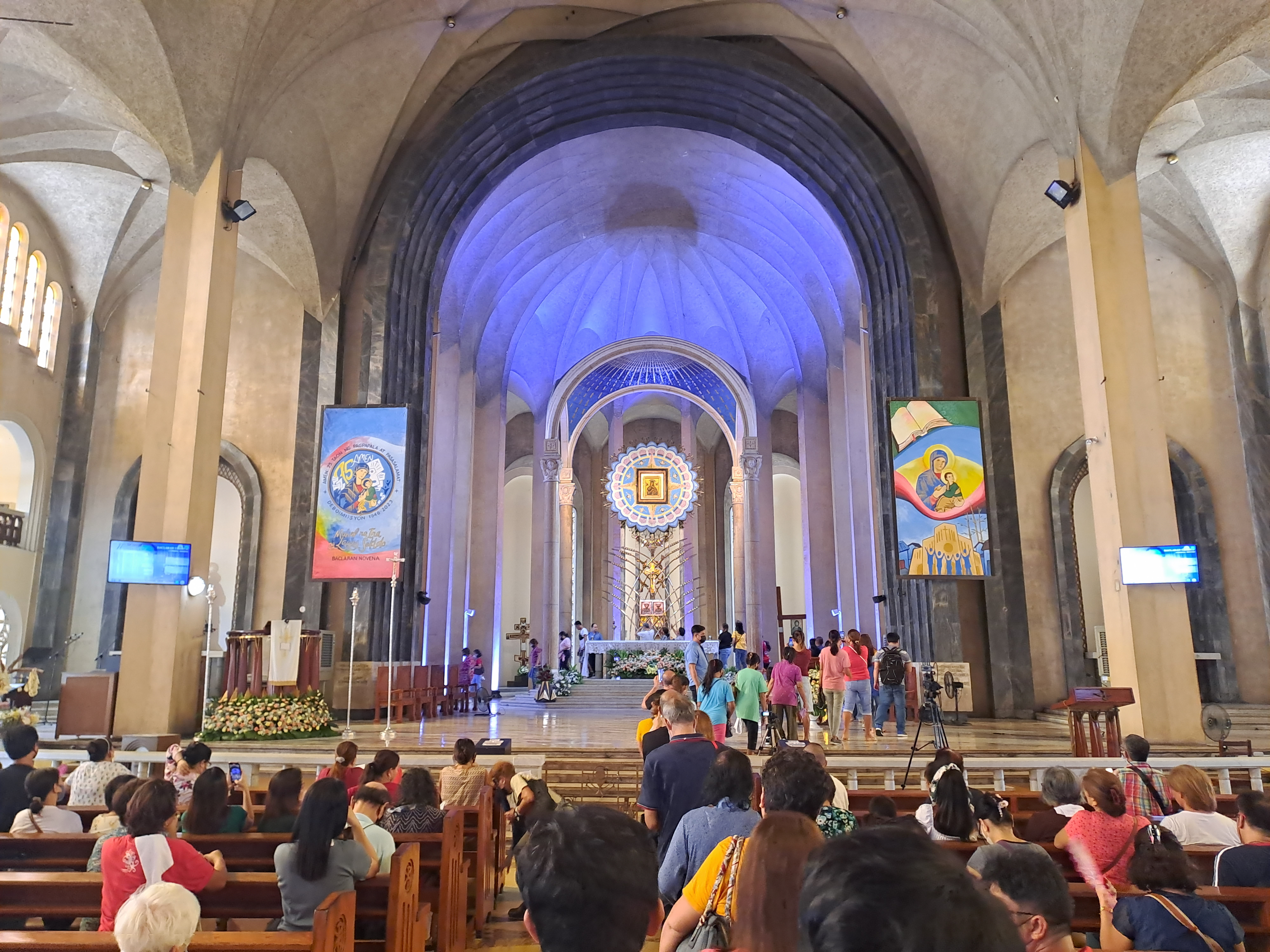
The sanctuary

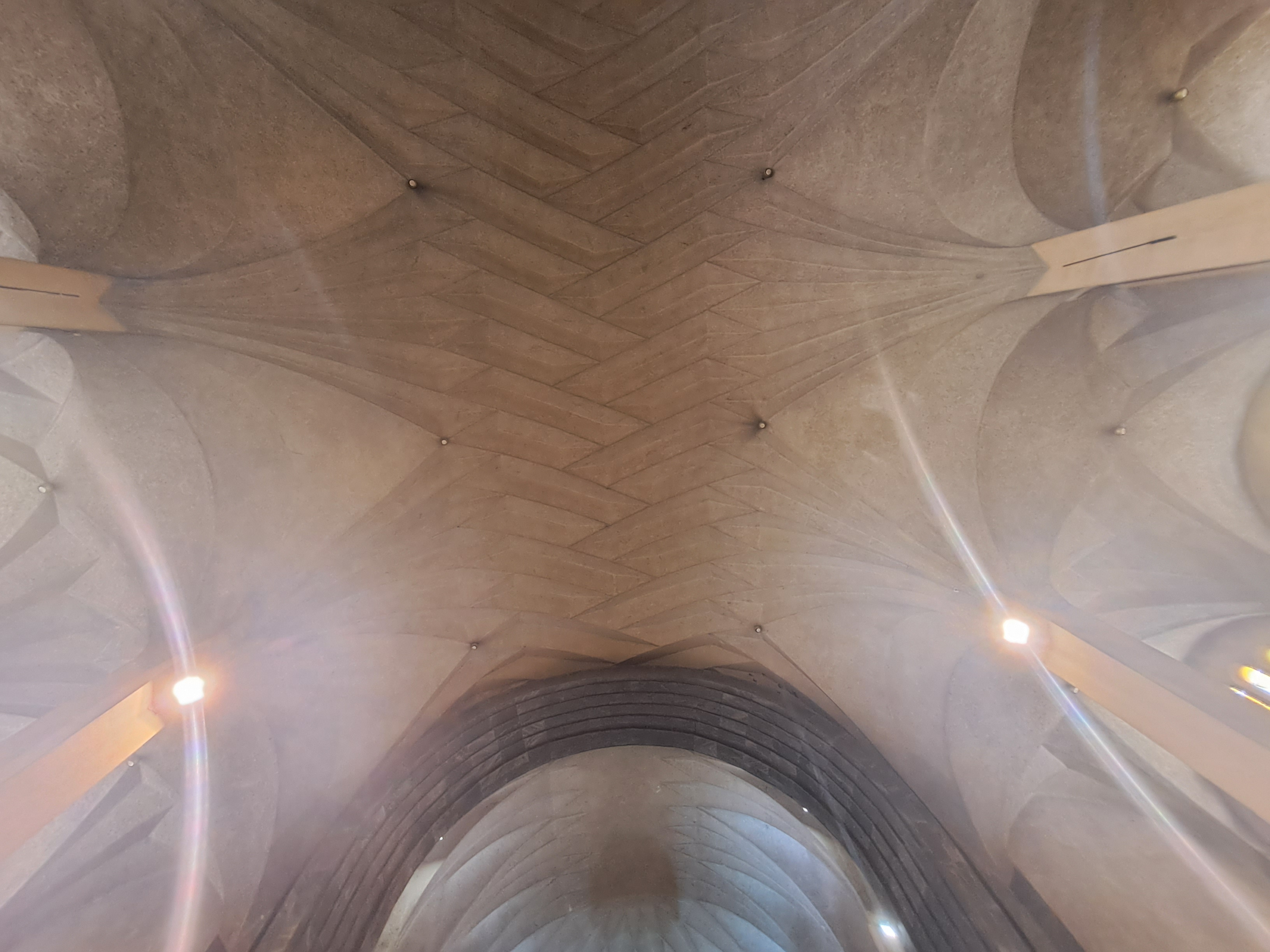
Roof interior ribbing

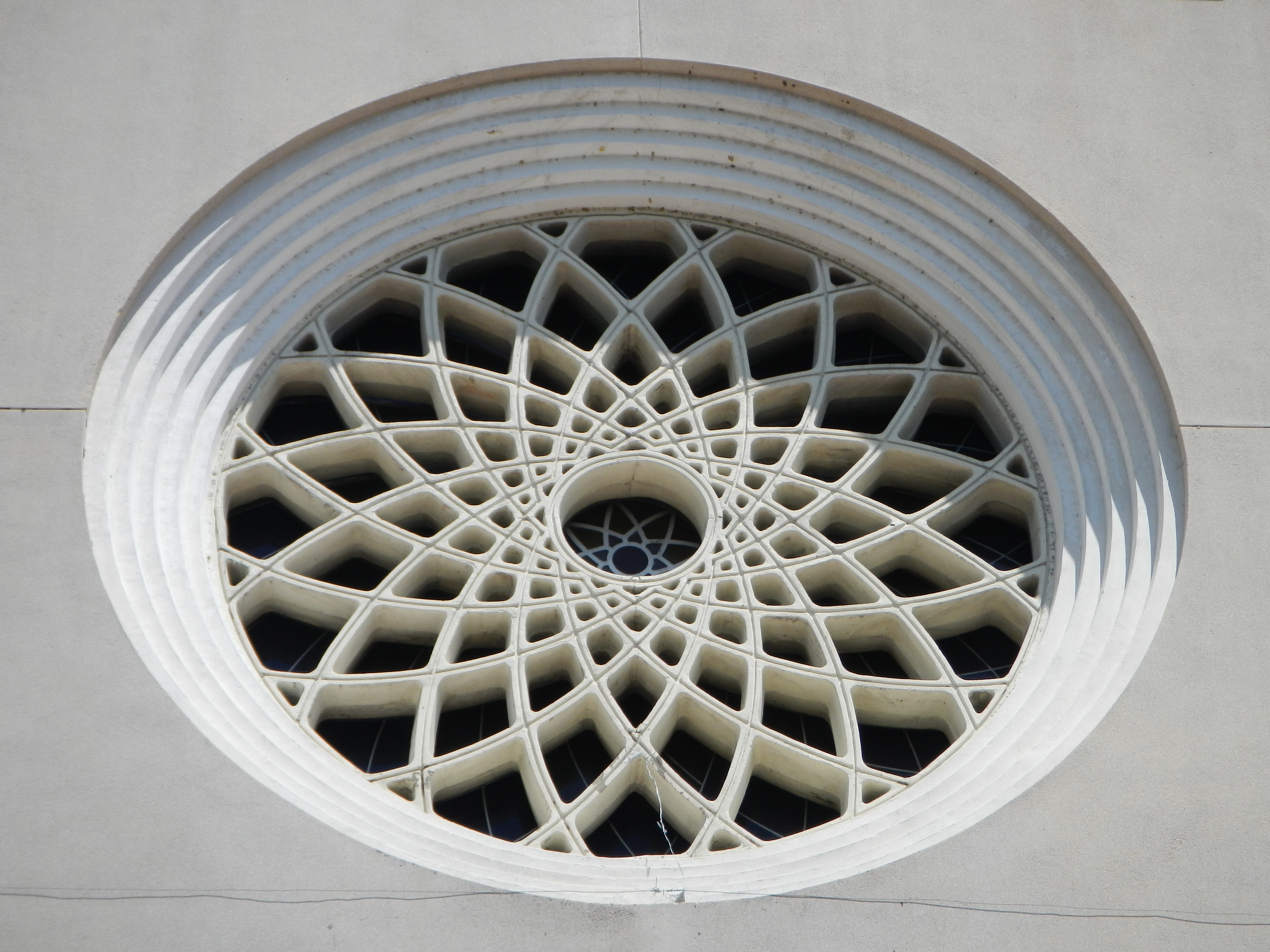
Rose window

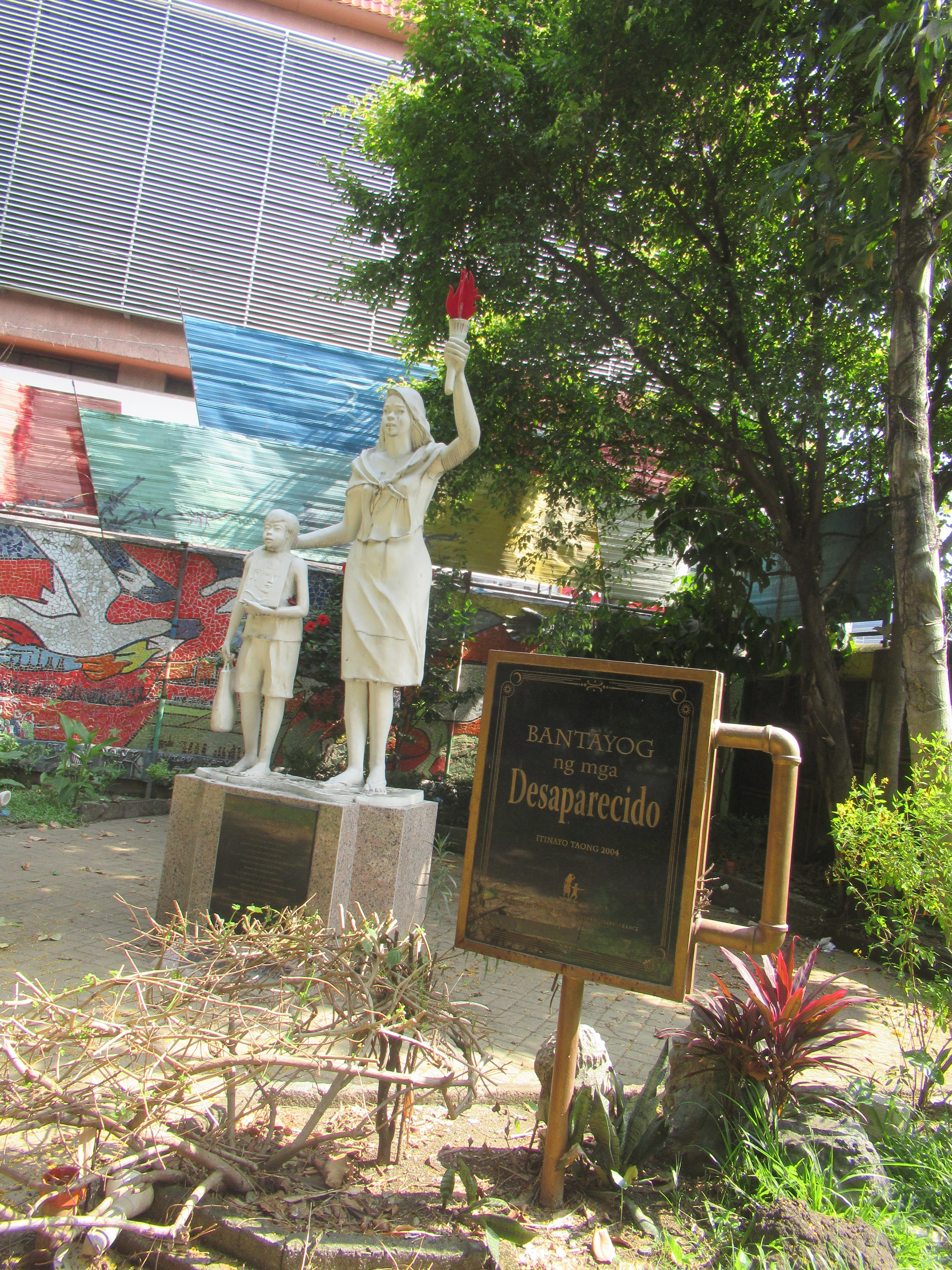
Bantayog ng mga Desaparecidos

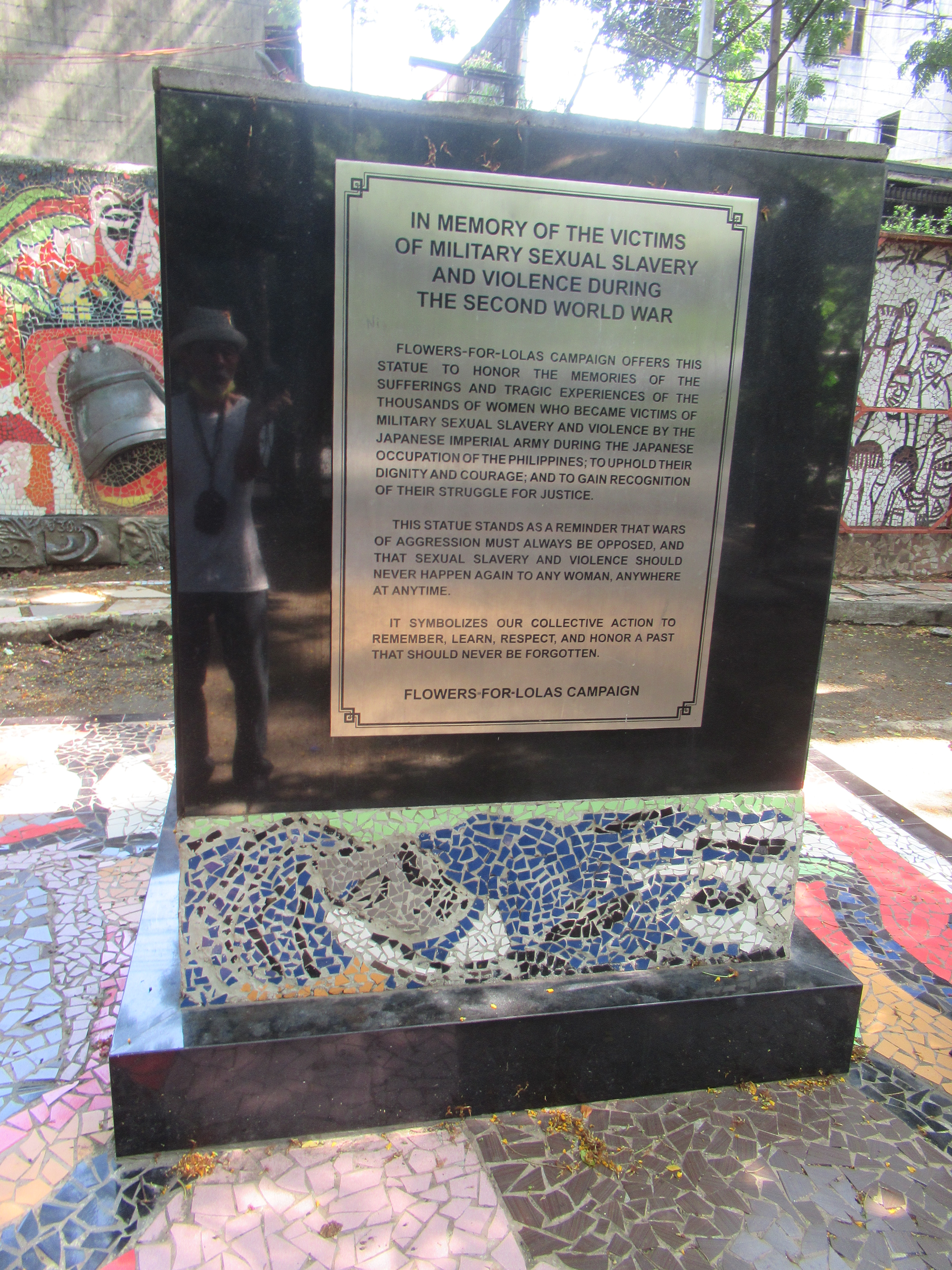
Flower-for-Lolas Campaign Monument

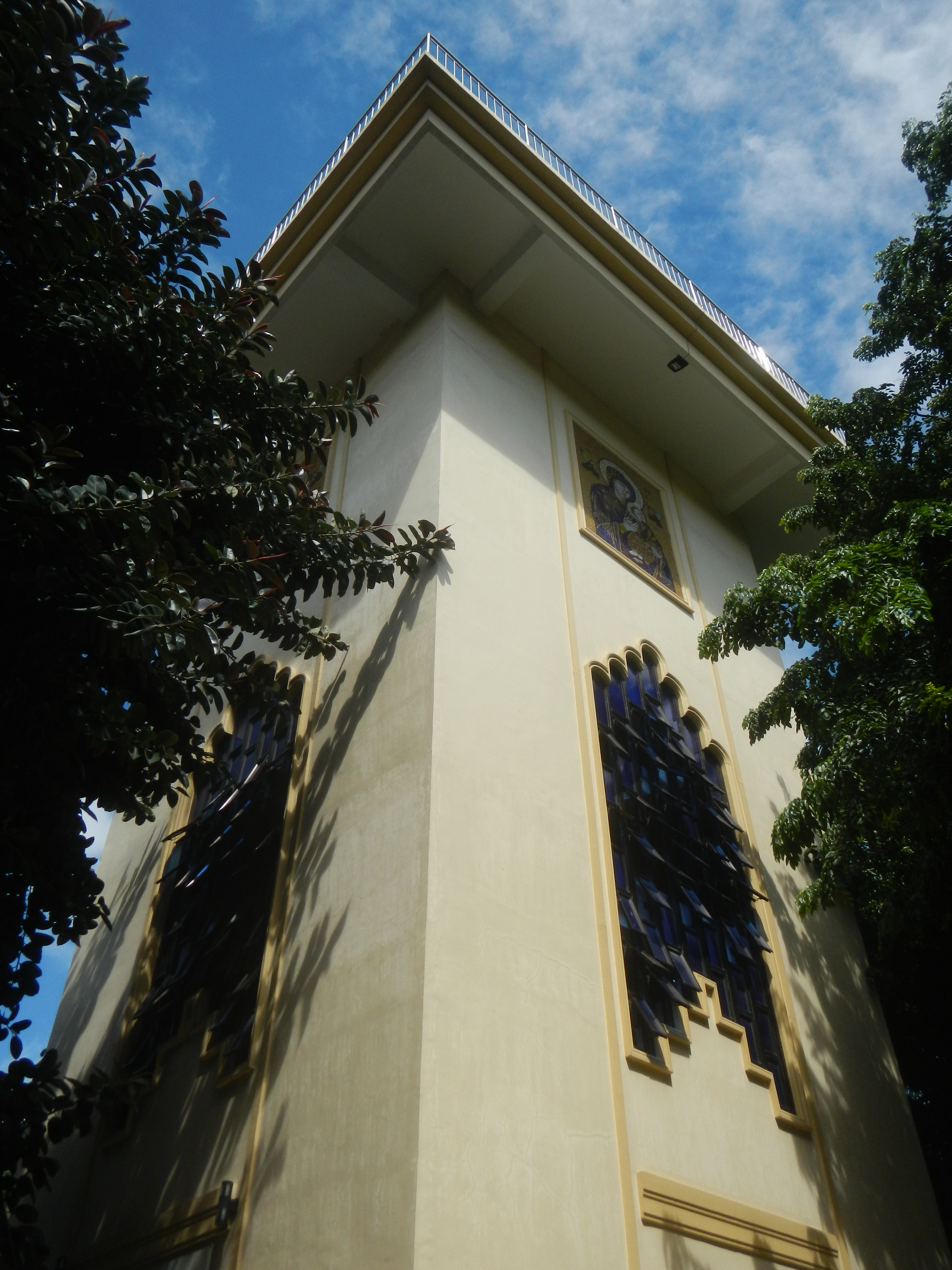
The detached belfry housing the carillon

== Organization ==
The shrine is under Santa Rita de Cascia Parish, located a few blocks away from the Redemptorist Church, within the Vicariate of Santa Rita de Cascia in the Diocese of Parañaque. The shrine is situated along Roxas Boulevard in Baclaran, Parañaque, Metro Manila. It is primarily financed by donations and Mass intention donations from Filipinos in the country as well as Overseas Filipinos, and in turn funds charitable social programs for the poor.

When the early Redemptorists first arrived in Baclaran, they insisted the church beside their convent would not become a parish but a mission station to free them from sacramental work, except the Eucharist and Penance. Redemptorists chose this arrangement to concentrate on fostering devotion to Our Mother of Perpetual Help, administering of Sacrament of Penance, and mission work, particularly with the poor in Manila and wider Tagalog-speaking region.

Canon Law of the Catholic Church defines a shrine as "a church or other sacred place which, with the approval of the local Ordinary, is by reason of special devotion frequented by the faithful as pilgrims (Can. 1230). Canon Law explains the implications of being a shrine: "As shrines the means of salvation are to be more abundantly made available to the faithful: by sedulous proclamation of the word of God, by suitable encouragement of liturgical life, especially by the celebration of the Eucharist and penance, and by the fostering of approved forms of popular devotion" (Can 1234 §1). "In shrines or in places adjacent to them, votive offerings of popular art and devotion are to be displayed and carefully safeguarded" (Can 1234 §2).

=== Rectors ===
- Gerard O'Donnell (1948)
- Lewis O'Leary (1948–1958)
- Patrick Deane (1958–1985)
- Teofilo Vinteres (1985–2000)
- Pedro Katigbak (2000–2004)
- Joseph Echano (2004–2007, 2015–2016)
- Victorino A. Cueto (2007–2015, 2019–2023)
- Carlos G. Ronquillo (2016–2019)
- Rico John C. Bilangel (2023–present)
