= Book of Common Prayer (1559) =

Anglican liturgical book

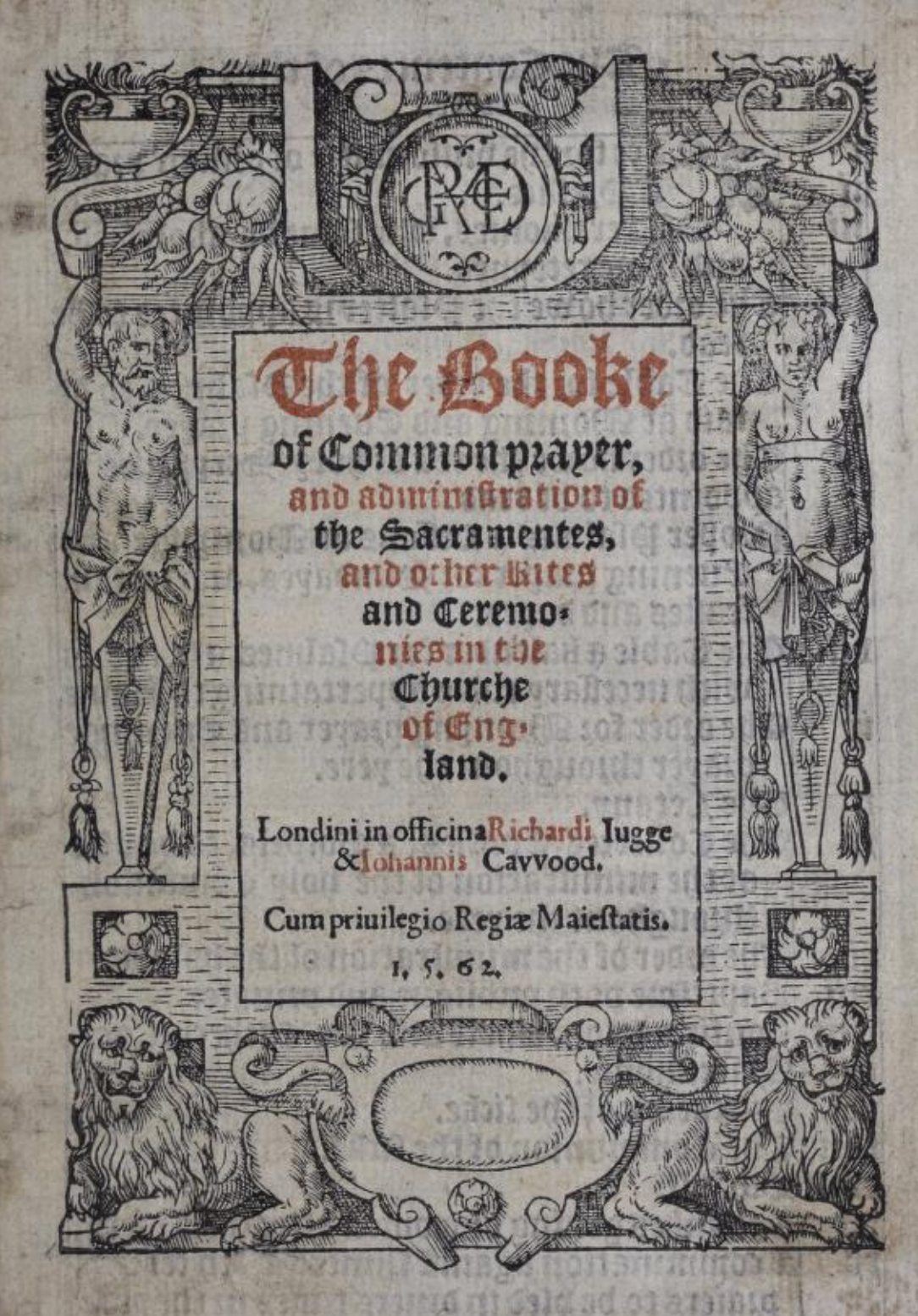
Title page of a 1562 Jugge and Cawood printing of the 1559 Book of Common Prayer

The 1559 Book of Common Prayer, (Note: The full title of the 1552 prayer book as it appears in a 1559 Jugge and Cawood printing was The Booke of common praier and administration of the Sacramentes and other rites and Ceremonies in the Churche of Englande. In modern English, the title is The Book of Common Prayer and Administration of the Sacraments, and other Rites and Ceremonies in the Church of England, the same title as the 1552 prayer book.) also called the Elizabethan prayer book, is the third edition of the Book of Common Prayer and the text that served as an official liturgical book of the Church of England throughout the Elizabethan era.

Elizabeth I became Queen of England in 1558 following the death of her Catholic half-sister Mary I. After a brief period of uncertainty regarding how much the new queen would embrace the English Reformation, the 1559 prayer book was approved as part of the Elizabethan Religious Settlement. The 1559 prayer book was largely derived from the 1552 Book of Common Prayer approved under Edward VI. Retaining much of Thomas Cranmer's work from the prior edition, it was used in Anglican liturgy until a minor revision in 1604 under Elizabeth's successor, James I. The 1559 pattern was again retained by the 1662 Book of Common Prayer, which remains in use by the Church of England.

The 1559 prayer book and its use throughout Elizabeth's 45-year reign secured the Book of Common Prayer's prominence in the Church of England and is considered by many historians as embodying the Elizabethan church's drive for a via media between Protestant and Catholic impulses and cementing the church's particular strain of Protestantism. Others have assessed it as an achievement in Elizabeth's commitment to an evangelical and stridently Protestant faith.

The text became integrated with late 16th-century English society and the diction used within the 1559 prayer book has been credited with helping mould the English language's modern form. Historian Eamon Duffy considered the Elizabethan prayer book an embedded and stable "re-formed" development out of medieval piety that "entered and possessed" the minds of the English people. A. L. Rowse asserted that "it is impossible to over-estimate the influence of the Church's routine of prayer".

== History ==
=== Edwardine prayer books and Mary's reign ===
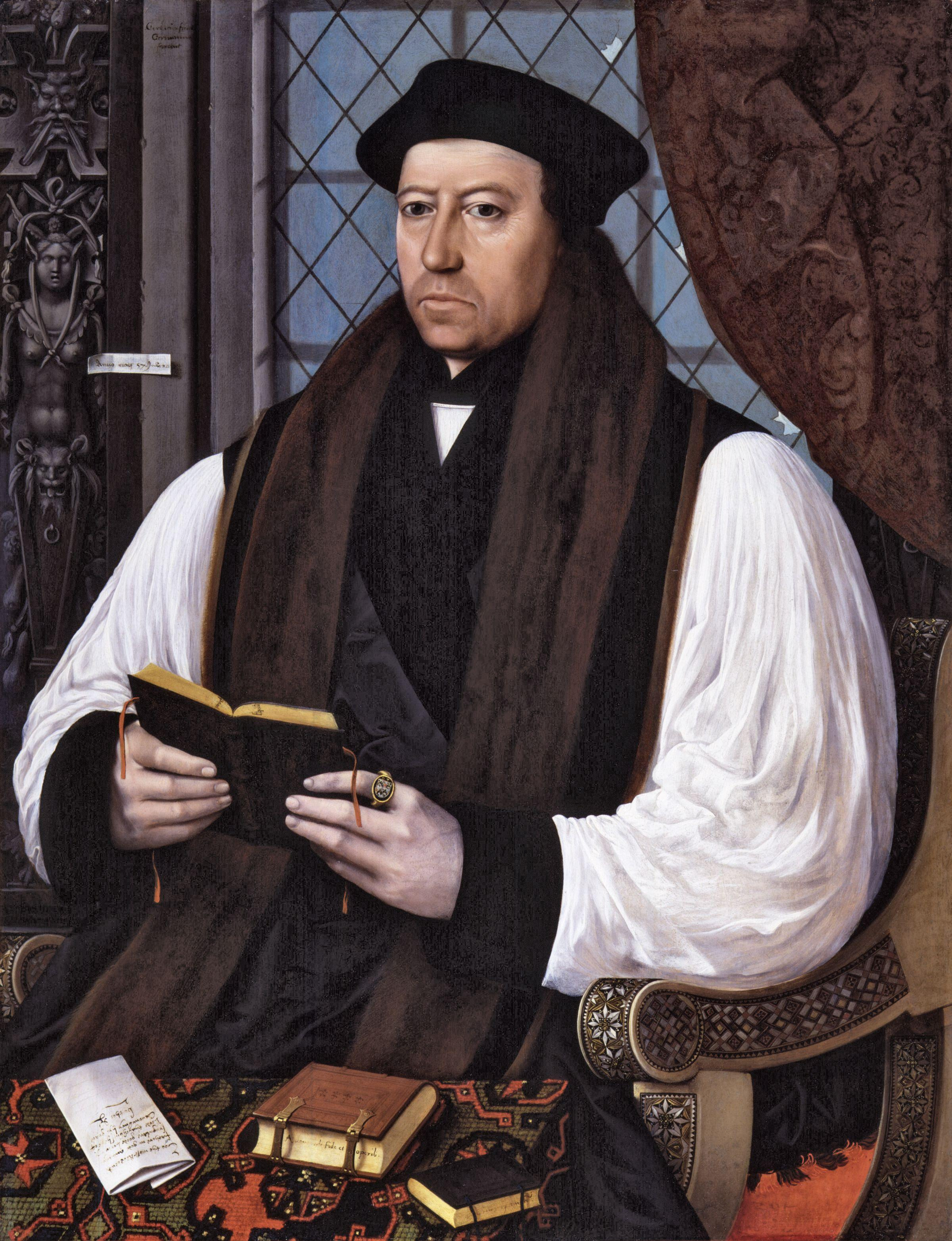
Thomas Cranmer, chief compiler of the first two prayer books

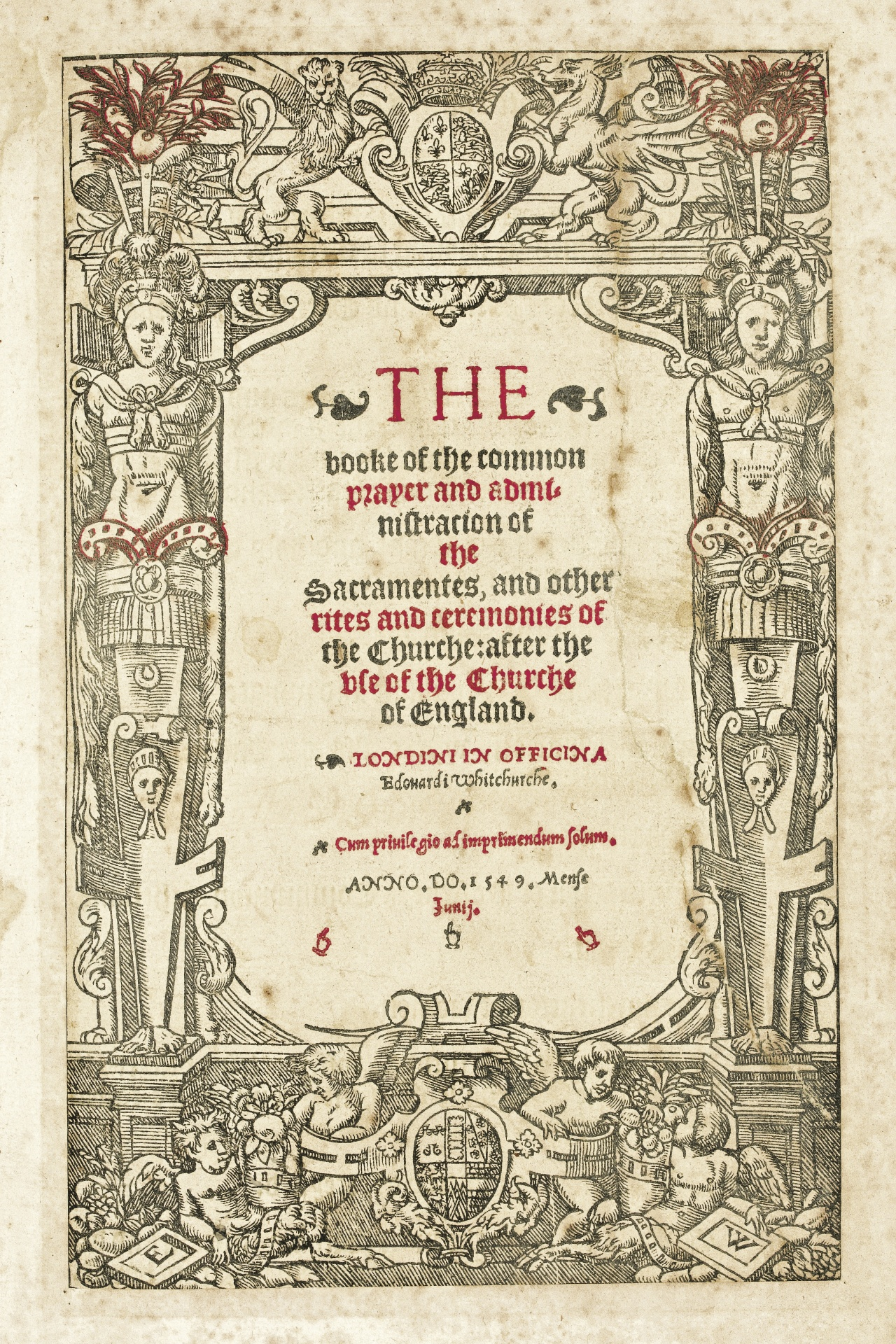
Title page of the 1549 Book of Common Prayer

When Edward VI succeeded his father Henry VIII as King of England in 1547 on the latter's death, the young king's regency council encouraged the English Reformation and its associated Protestant liturgical reforms in England. These reforms would be undertaken by Thomas Cranmer, the archbishop of Canterbury, who had already performed revisions under Henry such as to the litany in 1544. Cranmer was familiar with contemporary Lutheran developments as well as the Catholic efforts to reform the Roman Breviary under Cardinal Quiñones. Cranmer's royally authorized 1548 Order of the Communion introduced an English-language devotion into the Latin Mass along the lines of work done by Martin Bucer and Philip Melanchthon in Cologne. On Pentecost Sunday 1549, the first Book of Common Prayer was issued under an Act of Uniformity and replaced the Latin rites for service in the Church of England.

The first prayer book reflected a variety of influences. Cranmer may have introduced an Epiclesis into the 1549 Communion canon based on familiarity with the Divine Liturgies of Saint John Chrysostom and Saint Basil. Other services were derived from the Use of Sarum (the liturgical use of Salisbury Cathedral) and still others were translations of the old rites from Latin into English. A rubric prohibited the Catholic practice of elevating the Communion elements, and other Protestant interpolations and simplifications appear throughout the text. Though some Catholics such as the imprisoned bishop Stephen Gardiner assessed the 1549 Communion rite as "not distant from the Catholic faith", peasants in the West Country launched the unsuccessful Prayer Book Rebellion partially as a bid to restore the old rites.

Despite resistance, the English Reformation and its liturgical developments continued. The primer issued under Henry was further reformed with the Hail Mary deleted while Latin liturgical books were defaced. The first Edwardine Ordinal (Note: The word ordinal was not used in reference to the ordination ritual texts during or prior to the Elizabethan era; pre-Reformation ordinals compiled rubrics primarily associated with the liturgical year. Frank Edward Brightman believed that the word ordinal was first used in the context of ordination rituals in 1656, while the Oxford English Dictionary places the date at 1658.) appeared in 1550; its vesting rubrics proved insufficiently reformed for John Hooper, who convinced the young king to authorize more reformed vestment regulations in the subsequent ordinal and prayer book. Cranmer's work in the 1552 Book of Common Prayer–authorized for introduction on All Saints' Day that year by another Act of Uniformity–further directed English worship towards Protestantism. The Black Rubric, which was added to 1552 text after parliament had approved it, was a notable result of Protestant pressure from Hooper, John Knox, Nicholas Ridley, and Peter Martyr Vermigli. It explained that kneeling in the Communion office did not imply Eucharistic adoration nor "any real and essential presence there being of Christ's natural flesh and blood".

The momentum towards Protestantism was halted after Edward's death on 6 July 1553, which led to the accession of his Catholic half-sister, Mary I. (Note: Protestants had briefly attempted to install Lady Jane Grey on the throne prior to Mary successfully succeeding Edward.) Prior to her accession, Mary had her chaplains celebrate Mass according to the pre-prayer book rites. According to Charles Wriothesley's Chronicle, some London parishes restored the Latin Mass of their own accord upon Mary's accession. Liturgical books that were supposed to have been defaced or destroyed under Edward reemerged, sometimes without damage. However, the new queen soon proved unpopular. Her efforts to restore English religion to the state it had existed in before Henry's reforms–alongside her marriage to the Spanish Philip II–brought opposition, not least due to the financial costs involved. Many prominent Protestant fled to avoid becoming imprisoned or executed during the Marian persecutions. These exiles in Continental Europe became influenced by the worship patterns of Protestant exiles in Frankfurt and John Calvin's Geneva. Before her death in 1558, Mary's efforts had claimed Cranmer's life.

=== Elizabeth's succession, revision, and adoption ===
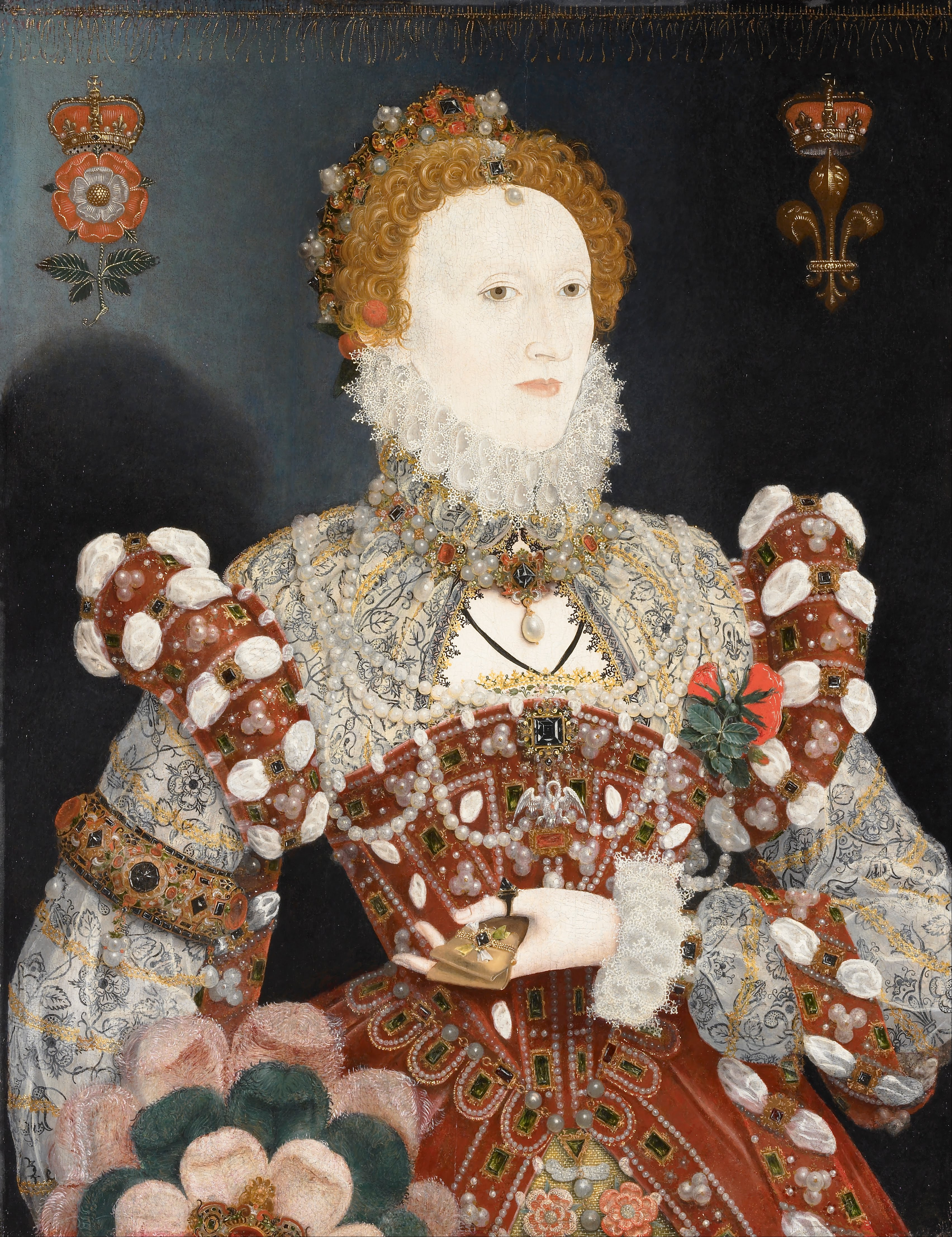
The Pelican Portrait of Elizabeth I by Nicholas Hilliard

Elizabeth succeeded Mary as queen on 17 November 1558. During her sister's reign, Elizabeth had outwardly embodied worship in conformity to the Catholic practices Mary had promoted. However, there were widespread rumours that Elizabeth's faith more approximated that of her half-brother Edward VI. Elizabeth did not firmly pronounce her preferences before her first parliament sat. However, the early years of her reign would be marked by both the Elizabethan Religious Settlement and a restoration of the Edwardine patterns of "matters and ceremonies of religion".

By December 1558, rumours circulated that the English Litany had been restored in Elizabeth's Chapel Royal. On Christmas, the celebrating bishop refused Elizabeth's request that he refrain from elevating the sacramental host, leading her to leave the chapel after singing the gospel. She appointed Richard Jugge as the Queen's Printer and had him print a pamphlet containing a version of the Cranmerian Litany for use in the Chapel Royal at the beginning of 1559; (Note: The Litany as printed by Jugge (an octavo under the name Letanye) deleted the anti-papal prayers that had been used under Kings Henry VIII and Edward VI.) Jugge was joined by John Cawood, who had held the position under Mary and was eventually reinstated by Elizabeth. At her coronation on 15 January 1559 and the 25 January opening of parliament–both at Westminster Abbey–Elizabeth eschewed some ceremonial aspects of the events and processed in with the Chapel Royal singers rather than the typical monks.

On 9 February 1559, a Bill of Supremacy was introduced in the House of Commons to restore the Church of England's independence that had been lost under Mary. It was met with opposition from both Mary's bishops and some in the reformed party. J. E. Neale believed this bill's permission for Communion under both kinds indicates that Elizabeth and her advisors were unwilling to pursue a new Act of Uniformity during the queen's first parliament, as this allowance would have been made superfluous by the latter legislation. Parliament committed the supremacy bill to two returned Marian exiles, Anthony Cooke and Francis Knollys, on 15 February after lengthy debate.

Subsequently, two bills were introduced on 15 and 16 February to establish an English liturgy, though without support from the government. Neale believed these proposals referred to either the 1552 prayer book or a revised Frankfurt liturgy. These bills quickly disappeared but likely contributed to Cooke and Knollys including provisions for an English liturgy in the Bill of Supremacy as reintroduced by their committee on 21 February. On 3 March, the conservative Convocation of Canterbury delivered their decisions in opposition to the supremacy bill to Lord Keeper Nicholas Bacon to no apparent effect. The liturgical provisions were removed from the bill as a concession to conservatives in the House of Lords, passing there on 22 March. With this, Elizabeth became Supreme Governor of the Church of England.

This frustrated the reformed party in Commons which wished to expel the papacy from English affairs but also considered the lack of liturgical revision unacceptable. Elizabeth may have been content with this outcome, willing to incrementally introduce the minor reforms initially implemented in her chapel. However, the increasing threat posed by both emboldened Marian conservatives and disaffected reformers in Commons meant that the post-Easter parliamentary proceedings would emphasize liturgical revision. On 22 March, the Wednesday of Holy Week, Elizabeth intended to issue a proclamation permitting all Englishmen to receive Communion in both kinds in defiance of the Catholic practice. Though this proclamation went unissued, it was printed and made implicit reference to restoring the 1548 Order of the Communion or a similar liturgical supplement. By Easter, Elizabeth was privately receiving Communion in both kinds, though–contrary to some historical speculation–did not introduce the 1552 prayer book on that date as it would have undermined her legal legitimacy.

On Easter Monday, John Jewel wrote to fellow returned Marian exile Peter Martyr of a planned disputation between the Marian conservatives and the reformers. Simultaneously, Elizabeth began floating the idea of "the Mass being said in English". The privy council selected three subjects for the debate: the necessity of vernacular liturgy, whether a national church had a right to prescribe its own liturgy, and whether the Mass was a propitiatory sacrifice. This disputation, perhaps arranged during the lull between the Bill of Supremacy's initial debate and passage in the House of Lords, was intended to secure the Protestant side's success. The Westminster Disputation's first session on 31 March likely indicated that the Marian bishops would not concede the departure from papal authority and, before the 3 April second session could begin, the entire papalist party was arrested. Conservative will was broken. An Uniformity bill was read in Commons on 18 April and was passed ten days later with limited opposition in the House of Lords. The Commons passed a supremacy bill declaring Elizabeth "supreme governor"–a title they had initially rejected in favour of "supreme head"–on 29 April.

The book attached to the Act of Uniformity 1558 (Note: The Act of Uniformity was passed in April 1559. However, all Acts of Parliament prior to the Acts of Parliament (Commencement) Act 1793 were ex post facto laws that came into effect on the first day of the session. The first Parliament of Elizabeth I met three months earlier in January; the year 1559 did not begin until 25 March 1559. Therefore, the Act of Uniformity was officially dated 1558 by the Statute Law Revision Act 1948.) was the 1552 prayer book, though with what Bryan D. Spinks called "significant, if not totally explicable, alterations." Among the changes was the removal of the explanatory Black Rubric from the Communion service. Also removed were the prayers against the pope in the Litany. The new Ornaments Rubric, while not the subject of debate at the time of adoption, was vague regarding what vestments it permitted. Printing rights for the newly adopted prayer book were solely extended to the Queen's Printers, a monopoly that reflected the text's value to the state. The prayer book was used in the queen's chapel on 12 May and legally introduced on the Feast of St. John the Baptist, 24 June. (Note: In January 1560, the Parliament of Ireland passed an Act of Uniformity very similar to that passed in England the year before over much opposition, establishing the Elizabethan prayer book in Ireland.)

=== Use and opposition ===
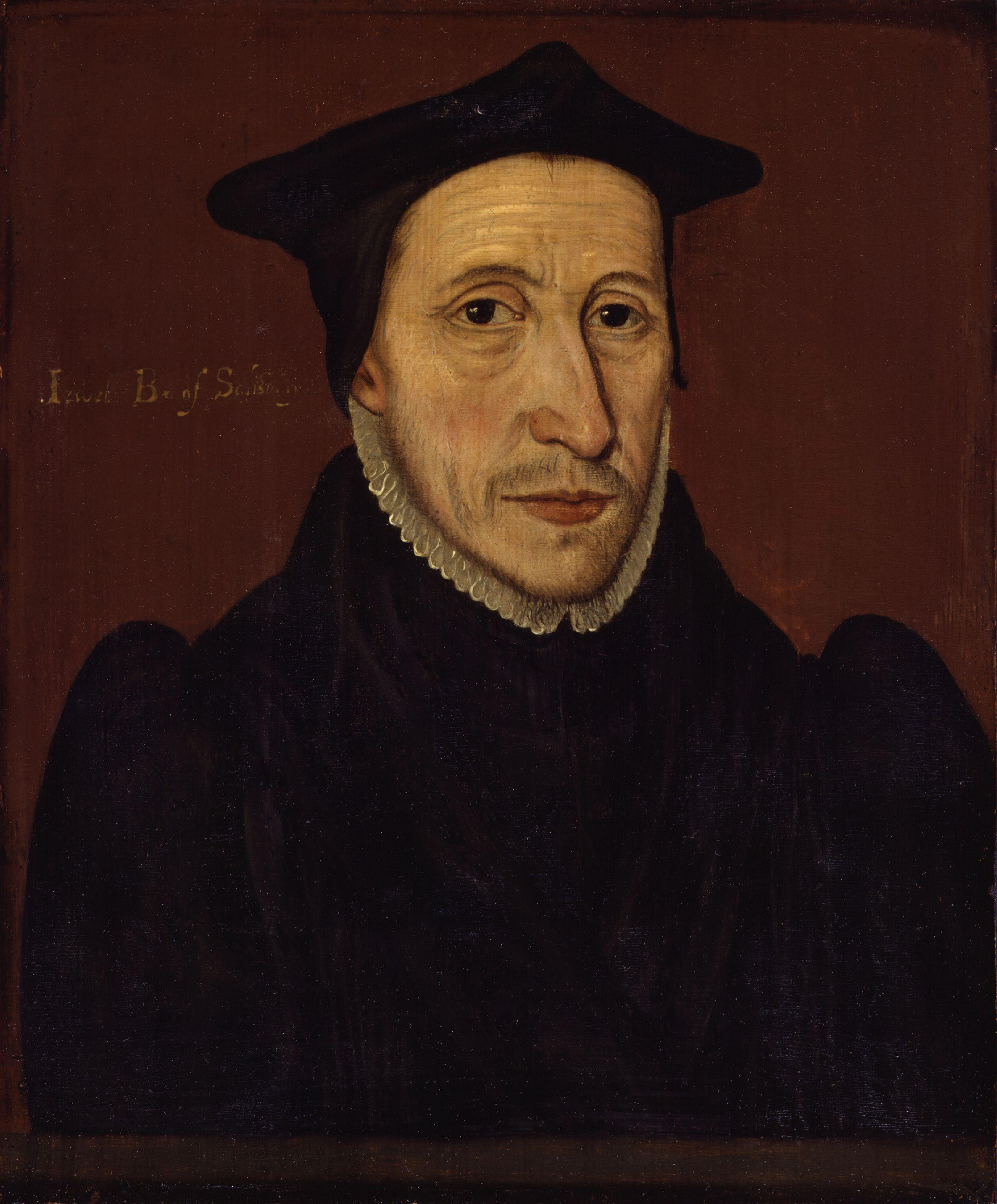
John Jewel considered the reformed doctrine of Elizabethan worship sound but lamented in November 1559 that her Chapel Royal's ceremonies and ornaments contained "too much foolery".

The authorized worship of the Elizabethan church could be broken up into three categories: the first was the Litany and approved versions of the Elizabethan prayer book, the second included the 1559 Elizabethan primer and other authorized private devotionals, and the third being the compilations of occasionally authorized prayers that for celebrations and times of fasting. The Act of Uniformity that introduced the 1559 prayer book had also required conformity to it and mandated Sunday attendance, with fines for all those who failed to attend. (Note: The fine was 12 d., equivalent to £11 in 2010.) Of roughly 9,400 Church of England clergy, around 189 refused the 1559 prayer book on adoption and were deprived of their benefices. Despite this, the act also provided for variety in allowing the queen to order and publish additional texts. Elizabeth exercised this right on 6 April 1560 to publish Liber Precum Publicarum, a Latin version of the prayer book for use in collegiate churches. The 1560 Latin prayer book included alterations which reflected a "practical conservatism" and reversion to the forms present within the Latin translation of the 1549 prayer book.

The prayer book provided thorough guidance on some ceremonial aspects but provided space for interpretation on others. Among those aspects of the prayer book left obliquely addressed was the presence of music. Liturgical music, particularly the compositions of Thomas Tallis and the Catholic recusant William Byrd for the Chapel Royal, was built around and in relationship with the Elizabethan prayer book. In cathedrals, collegiate churches, and chapels, music by Byrd, John Bull, Thomas Morley, Robert White, and others appeared in both in English and Latin for use with organs and choirs at prayer book services. However, through the 1570s, the death of organ repairers and rising inflation meant that these conservative practices grew rarer.

In 1564, the deprived Bishop of London Edmund Bonner challenged the legality of the 1559 ordinal. Bonner had been called to swear the oath of supremacy by Bishop Robert Horne, but Bonner declared that he did not consider Horne a bishop: the ordinal had not been mentioned in the Elizabethan Act of Uniformity, meaning that the ordinations and consecrations were technically irregular. In order to avoid a ruling on the matter, the case was dropped and, in 1566, parliament voted to retroactively authorize the 1559 ordinal and approve the ordinations that had taken place according to it.

Further discord arose regarding the Vestiarian controversy, a debate that had originated with Hooper under Edward and would continue under Elizabeth. The debate over which clerical vestments were appropriate for an English reformed church was excited by both the ambiguity of the 1559 prayer book's Ornaments Rubric and Elizabeth's promotion of vestments within her Chapel Royal. From 1559 until 1563, episcopal visitations provided a mechanism for enforcing the rubrics of the prayer book and allowed for additional regulation that furthered the reformed cause. Some bishops also met during this period and produced the "Interpretation of the Bishops", a resolution intended for acceptance by Convocation that clarified regulations and expectations for worship.

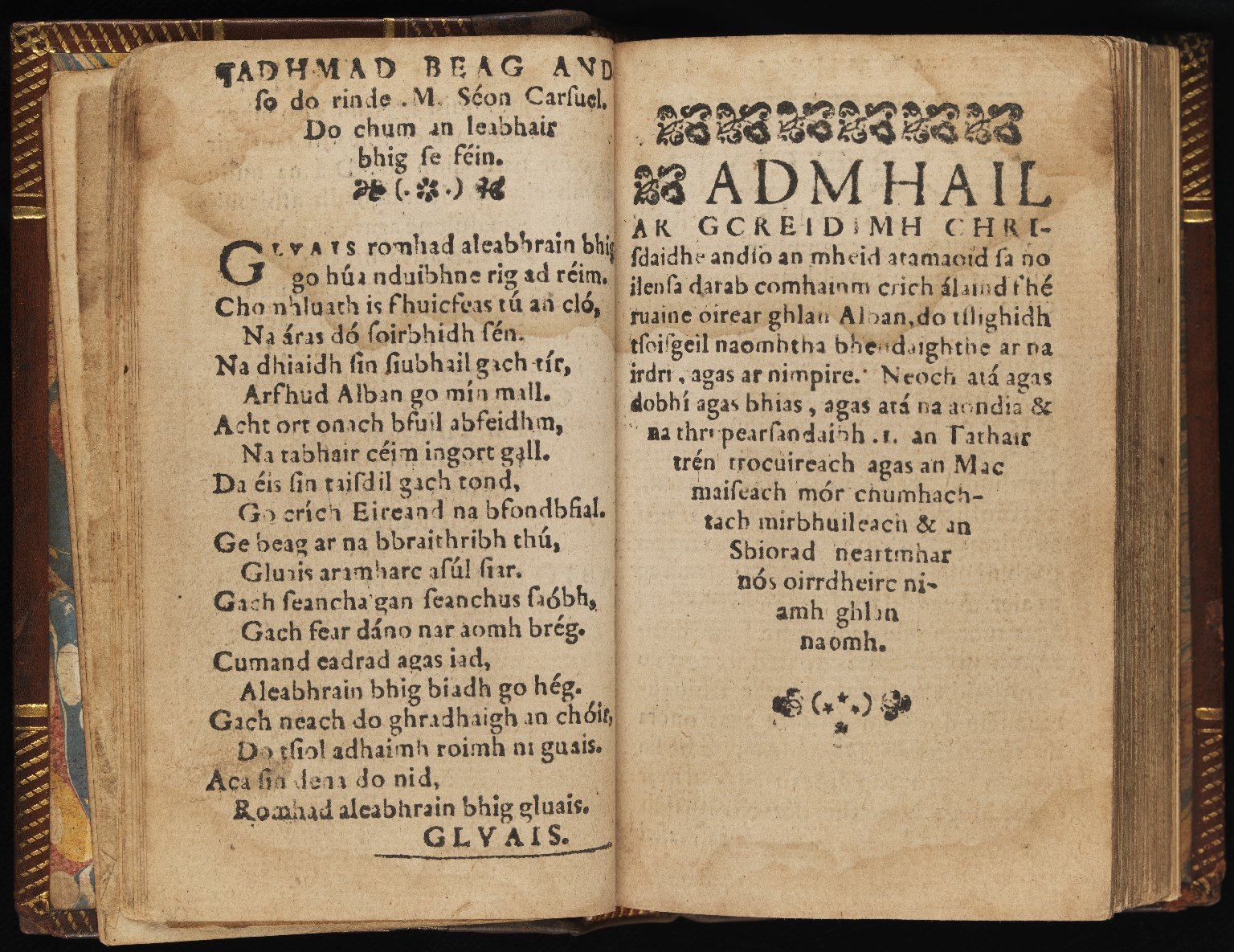
Frontispiece to the Scots Gaelic translation of John Knox's liturgy, 1567. Calvinist liturgies like Knox's challenged efforts to establish uniformity of worship in the Elizabethan church.

By the Convocation of 1563, the prayer book had become entrenched such that even staunch reformers who resented the prayer book's proximity to Catholic ritual and ceremonial practices did not propose any major revisions. Instead, these reformers wanted the 1563 Convocation to perfect the prayer book's rubrics to their preferences. Their proposals engaged with the same matter that the queen and bishops had already issued guidance on, and the proposals generally trended towards standardizing English parish worship upon Continental Protestant lines. The visitations and regulations established by the bishops between 1559 and 1563 had meant that, outside the exceptions of the Chapel Royal and cathedrals, worship according to a reformed interpretation of the prayer book was becoming normative. After several failed attempts at compromise, Archbishop of Canterbury Matthew Parker's 1566 Advertisements put an end to the encroaching Puritan restrictions on vesting. (Note: The 1566 concessions concluded that even though copes at the Communion office were invoked by the 1559 prayer book, they were only expected at cathedrals. For parishes, surplices were sufficient.)

Still, Continental and Calvinist reformed worship continued to pressure the 1559 prayer book. Knox had introduced his version of John Calvin's La Forme des Prières to Scotland in 1559. Later approved by the Church of Scotland as the Book of Common Order, this Genevan pattern was being secretly used in London by 1567. After a revised version of this text was printed in London in 1585, a bill was introduced to House of Commons to select it as a replacement for the 1559 prayer book. Elizabeth suppressed the text and imprisoned those behind it in the Tower of London. Some turned to the Geneva Bible with its Calvinist notes and catechism, which was occasionally bound with the 1559 prayer book after 1583. Others began acquiring smaller printings of the authorized prayer book for purposes of devotion and establishing confessional identity.

Though the 1552 prayer book had been taken to by the minister of Hugh Willoughby's ill-fated Arctic expedition, the 1559 prayer book was the first English prayer book to reach the New World. Robert Wolfall, minister for Martin Frobisher's 1578 expedition, was reported by Richard Hakluyt to have celebrated the Communion upon the expedition's arrival at Frobisher Bay in July. (Note: On 21 June 1579, Church of England priest Francis Fletcher may have been the first to celebrate the prayer book's liturgy in the territory of the modern-day United States. Fletcher was part of Pelican's complement in Francis Drake's circumnavigation, perhaps celebrating according to the 1559 prayer book in territory claimed by Drake for Elizabeth, in what is now San Francisco Bay and near the site of the present-day Prayer Book Cross.)

=== Millenary Petition and replacement ===
Puritan objections to the Elizabethan prayer book persisted after the queen's death. With King James VI of Scotland arriving in England in 1603 to take up the English throne, Puritan ministers gave him the Millenary Petition calling for the full excision of Catholic influence from the church's religion. Among the petition's demands were the deletion of the words "priest" and "altar", the removal of any implication that ministers could pronounce or grant absolution, and ceasing the use of vestments. Perhaps either seeking to appear open-minded or for his appreciation of debate, James opened the Hampton Court Conference in January 1604.

The resultant 1604 prayer book was only slightly different from the 1559 text, with some more significant changes to the baptismal rite. A catechism was also added. The Hampton Court Conference's prayer book and new canons formed a continuation of the Elizabethan religious life until the wars of the 1640s.

== Contents ==
The 1559 Book of Common Prayer is a revision of the 1552 prayer book. The changes from the 1552 text have been described as building towards comprehension across the various parties within the Church of England. At its initial promulgation, the 1559 prayer book's rubrics permitted a wider variety of vestments and ornaments. The Kalendar increased the number of lessons said throughout the year and reintroduced many saints' days first removed in the 1549 prayer book. Both the Ornaments Rubric and the Kalendar would be modified over the 1560s to become more palatable to the Puritan party.

Still, much was retained between editions: The Elizabethan prayer book's title was the same as the 1552. In keeping with both the 1549 and 1552 prayer books, the Visitation of the Sick attributed God as the cause of illness. As with both preceding prayer books, the largely unchanged 1559 prayer book's matrimonial office and allowance of lay baptism drew the ire of Puritans. The 1559 prayer book could at times provide extensive detail on how a rite was to be conducted, though its silence on some matters meant that individual congregations would often celebrate in distinct fashions. Not always explicitly addressed in the prayer book was its use alongside liturgical music.

The 1560 Latin-language prayer book, the Liber Precum Publicarum, was likely translated by Walter Haddon. Meant for use at the chapels of Oxford, Cambridge, Eton, and Winchester, its contents were different from those of the English 1559 prayer book to the chagrin of some Protestants; most Cambridge colleges reportedly refused to use it. Among the differences were the inclusion of a requiem service, epistlers and gospelers vested in copes, and sacramental reservation.

=== Morning and Evening Prayer ===
Morning Prayer took the role of the major Sunday service in smaller parishes, with Communion commonly occurring monthly, quarterly, or even more rarely. The typical Sunday service became the Morning Prayer, Litany, the first part of the Communion service, a sermon, and Evening Prayer with catechetical instruction.

The Ornaments Rubric appeared before Morning Prayer, with language that undid some of the anti-ceremonial components of the 1552 prayer book and established ornamentation and vesting along the lines of the 1549 prayer book. However, this rubric did not demand uniformity in practice. This did not prevent efforts from both those in favour of more traditional vesting practices and those with Puritan anti-vestment views from pushing the limits of this regulation. In the 19th century, this rubric was interpreted as having permitted Mass vestments, altars, and candles. Another rubric, again altering the 1552 pattern, provided detail on where a minister should stand during the Morning and Evening Prayer services.

=== Communion office ===
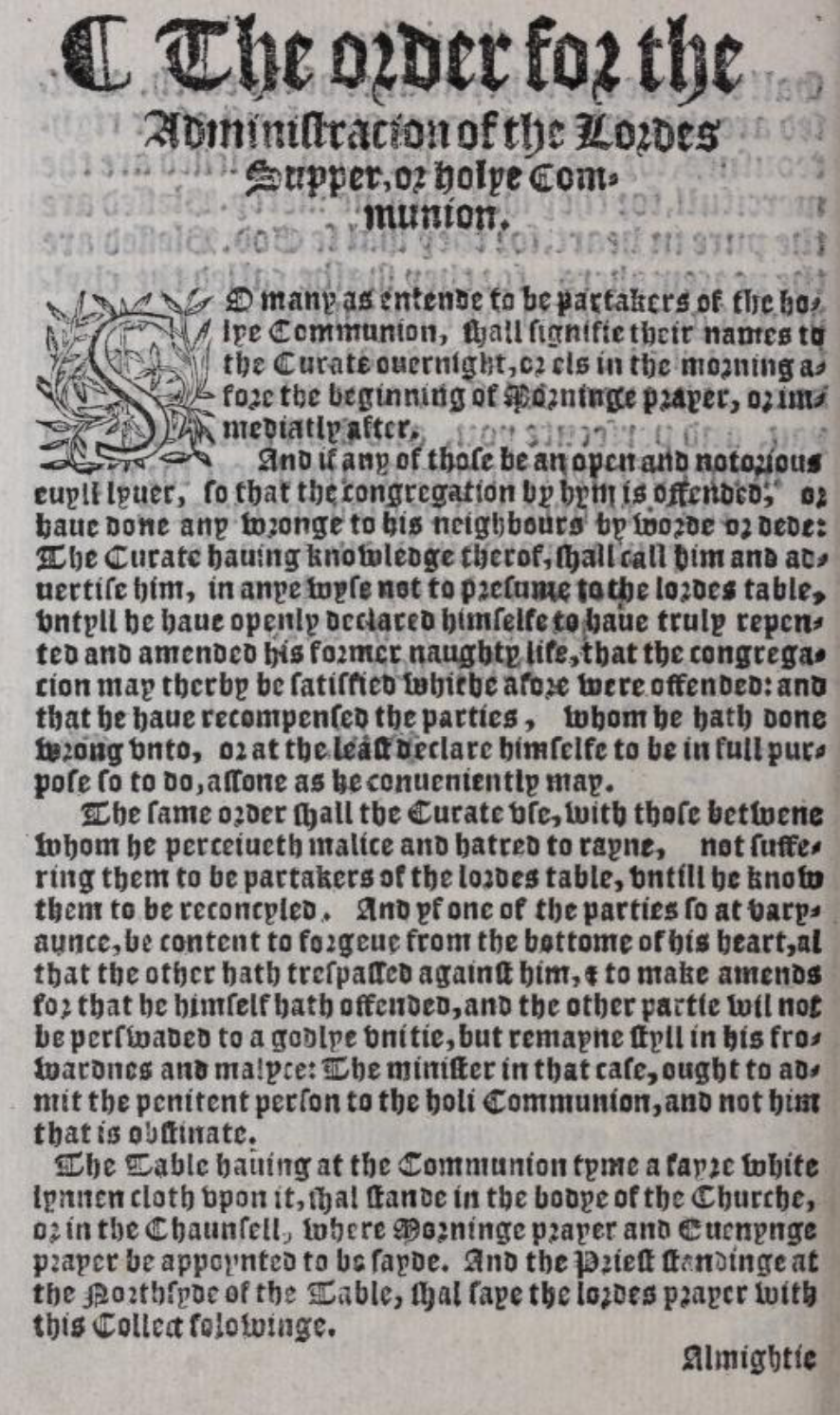
First page of the 1559 Communion office

The office's title, The Order of the Administration of the Lord's Supper or Holy Communion, was the same as the 1552 prayer book and retained through the 1662 prayer book. A rubric detailing the place where a priest should stand during the office from the 1552 prayer book was retained within both the Elizabethan Act of Uniformity and 1559 text, though Elizabeth almost immediately abrogated it. During the administration, two sentences from the preceding prayer books were, as Mark Chapman described, "somewhat incoherently combined" to form the following passage:

The Body of our Lord Jesus Christ which was given for thee, preserve thy body and soul into everlasting life [1549]; take and eat this in remembrance that Christ died for thee and feed on him in your hearts by faith with thanksgiving [1552].

The 1559 prayer book removed the 1552 prayer book's Black Rubric, causing dismay among Puritans. A declaration on the definition of kneeling which implicitly denied the real presence at Communion, it still remained in popular knowledge and contemporary reports maintain that its contents were taught and published. The Black Rubric reappeared in the 1662 prayer book in a modified form.

=== Ordinal ===
The 1559 ordinal, (Note: The title of the 1559 ordinal is The fourme and maner of making and consecratyng, bisshops, priestes, and deacons.) derived from the 1552 Edwardine Ordinal, was not included in the prayer book's contents lists. It contained several slight differences from the prior edition, with minor variation between the 1559 printings by Grafton and Jugge. The Jugge ordinal's printing was divided between several printers, with the first quire printed by Jugge and John Kingston and the second quire printed by Richard Payne and William Copland. The ordinal was not always bound with the 1559 prayer book and the separate sale of each appears to have been planned; the ordinal became an integrated part of the prayer book in the 1662 edition.

The litany recited at the beginning of the 1559 diaconal ordination rite is modified to replace Edward's name with Elizabeth's, swap pronouns, and remove the deprecation of the pope's "detestable enormities". A petition directed towards the ordinands included in the Edwardine ordinal is not missing in the 1559 ordinal. Grafton had included it, but the shared printing responsibility for the Jugge edition may have resulted in its accidental deletion. The diaconal ordination rite also contains what might have been the most significant change to the ordinal. The oath for the king's "supremacie" becomes one for the queen's "Soueraintee" and the pope is again no longer directly invoked. However, in what may have again been a result of the multiple printers behind the Jugge ordinal, the oath's title establishes it as one of "Soueraintee" but the rubric retains the word "supremacye". This discrepancy persisted in Anglican prayer books for over 300 years.

== Appraisal and influence ==
For a long time the second-most diffuse book in England behind only the Bible, the 1559 prayer book had a significant impact on English society. It was a departure from the trajectory the previous prayer books had taken–one of reform growing closer to Continental European Protestant worship–but also not a reversion to 1549, maintaining Protestantism as a crucial component of the Elizabethan Religious Settlement. The Elizabethan prayer book's longevity also distinguished it from its prayer book precedents, with its vernacular rites contributing to the linguistic environment that produced William Shakespeare; Shakespeare made reference to the prayer book's regular private use in his The Merchant of Venice.

The 1559 prayer book was slightly revised in 1604, followed by a more substantial revision that produced the 1662 Book of Common Prayer still used by Anglicans today. Spinks identified the 1559 prayer book as the point at which the Book of Common Prayer became "the 'incomparable liturgy'", a "hegemony" he assessed as surviving until the 1906 Royal Commission on Ecclesiastical Discipline. According to historian John Booty, the revision in 1661 did little to change the tone from that of the Elizabethan prayer book, with its model remaining normative in England until the Prayer Book (Alternative and Other Services) Measure 1965.

Eamon Duffy, in his The Stripping of the Altars, maintained that medieval piety was not replaced by the Elizabethan prayer book but rather "re-formed itself around the rituals and words of the prayer-book." While lamenting that "traditional religion" was "much reduced in scope, depth, and coherence", Duffy acknowledged that the people's consistent usage of the 1559 prayer book's meant "Cranmer's sombrely magnificent prose, read week by week, entered and possessed their minds, and became the fabric of their prayer". A. L. Rowse came to a similar conclusion, saying "it is impossible to over-estimate the influence of the Church's routine of prayer and good works upon that society".

Responding to the then-ongoing 1927–1928 Prayer Book Crisis to the adoption of the 1559 prayer book, William Joynson-Hicks compared the 16th-century episcopal resistance to Protestant liturgy to the bishops of his own time. Joynson-Hicks added that parliament was crucial in upholding the 1552 prayer book pattern in 1559, something he hoped would be repeated in 1928. However, he also lamented the lack of clarity within the Ornaments Rubric.

=== As a via media ===
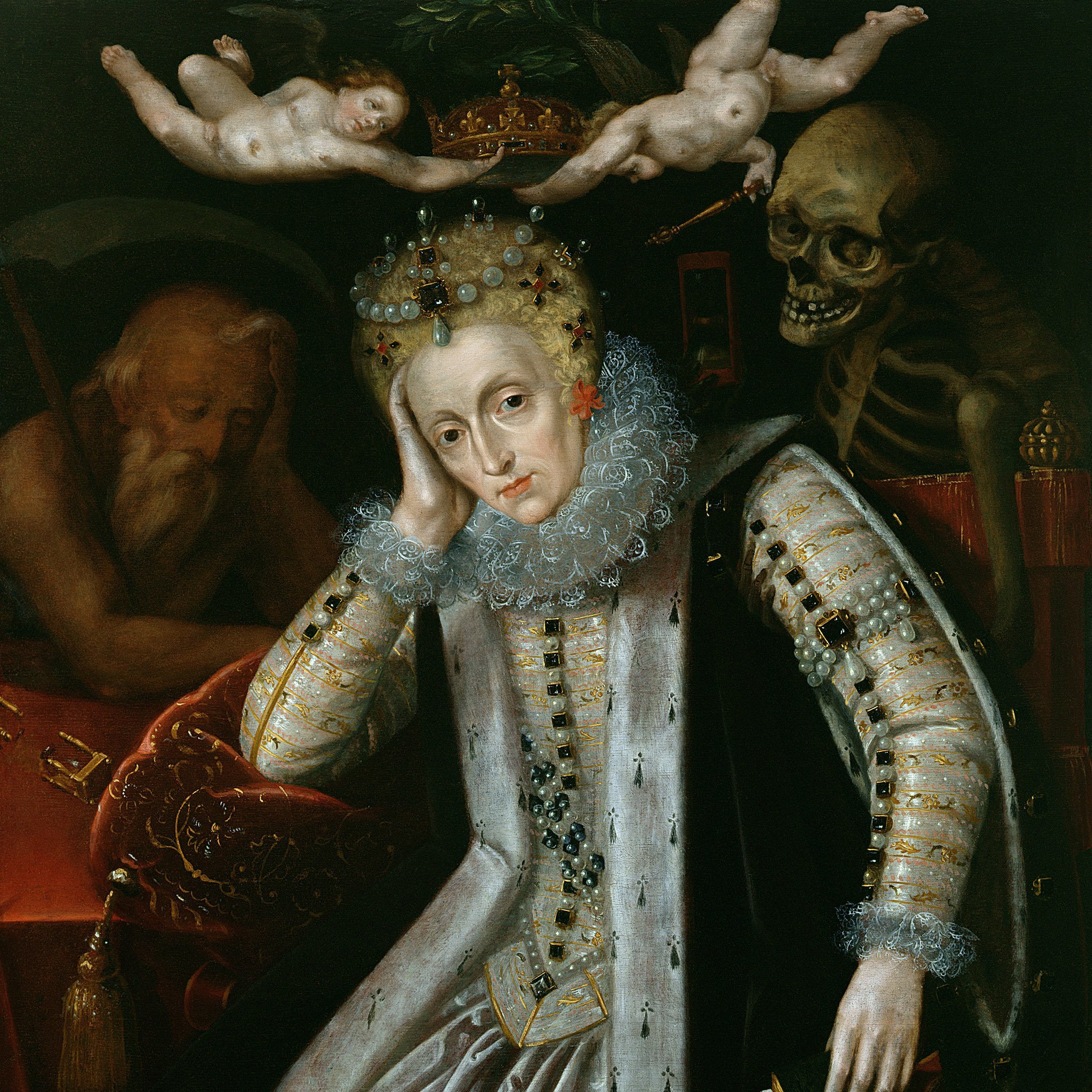
Historians debate to what extent the 1559 prayer book was the result of Elizabeth I seeking a via media between Reformation and Catholic impulses.

The intentions behind the 1559 prayer book, particularly the narrative of Elizabeth's pursuit of a via media, have been the subjects of debate among historians. The via media narrative–supported in the works of Brian Cummings, J. E. Neale, and Walter Frere–describes the Elizabethan prayer book as a compromise between Catholic and Protestant influence. This view remains popular, appearing regularly in English textbooks and academic volumes despite modern criticism. The queen and her ministers are typically described as having favoured the Catholic-leaning 1549 prayer book in conflict with those of reformed inclination. According to this view, parliamentary debate gave way to resolution through the adoption of the more reformed 1552 prayer book but only with alterations that reduced its Protestant character. Proponents point to three pieces of evidence: the December 1558 "Device for the alteration of religion" (thought to have called for a committee of revision), a letter from Edmund Gheast to William Cecil (which suggests that the revising committee met), and the 1549 prayer book (which these accounts imply Elizabeth preferred). (Note: Roger Bowers argued that instructions given to the Elizabeth's Chapel Royal composers suggested she initially planned to restore worship along the lines of the 1549 prayer book; MacCulloch has criticized Bowers's assessment due to the latter's misreading of dates.) Both Frere and John Henry Blunt held that these efforts established a continuity between the 1559 prayer book and the Latin service books of medieval England. (Note: Bishops Frere and Edgar Gibson faced contemporary criticism for their promotion of the via media interpretation of the Elizabethan liturgy and church, which critics such as Charles Sydney Carter regarded a minority anglo-catholic view that discounted the reformed character of both the Edwardine and Elizabethan churches.)

Some modern historians, including Stephen Alford and Diarmaid MacCulloch, have sought to revise the via media narrative by attempting to demonstrate Elizabeth's deep-seated Protestantism. Revisionists maintain that Elizabeth intended to restore the 1552 prayer book from the outset of her reign rather than adapting it as a concession. Critics of the compromise narrative argue that it requires a narrow view towards historical evidence, which revisionists instead appraise as betraying a fundamentally reformed nature of the 1559 prayer book's origins. Responding to MacCulloch's claim that Elizabeth reestablished the Edwardine church as it had existed in September 1552, Bryan D. Spinks argued that the rituals in Elizabeth's Chapel Royal, the 1560 Latin version of the prayer book, and the Elizabethan primers indicated a less reformed church.

A prayer book printed in 1559 by Richard Grafton and now at Corpus Christi College, Oxford, and signed by Elizabeth's privy council is held as evidence for the revisionist view. Formerly rejected as an unsanctioned text, the Corpus Christi prayer book is now interpreted as a legitimate and authorized text possibly intended for limited circulation with the Bill of Uniformity. The Corpus Christi prayer book contains alterations to the 1552 prayer book. As it is dated to early in the revision process and signed by Elizabeth's advisors, revisionists maintain that the Grafton printing demonstrates Elizabeth desire for a prayer book derived from the 1552 edition rather than initially promoting a reversion to the 1549 pattern. Historian Cyndia Susan Clegg has argued that the Corpus Christi prayer book marks Elizabeth as a strong evangelical. (Note: John Booty argued that "there is no great mystery concerning [Elizabeth's] religious predilections", citing some of Elizabeth's 1586 remarks on the proposed execution of Mary, Queen of Scots, to declare Elizabeth a Protestant-humanist.)
