= Book of Common Prayer (1604) =

Anglican liturgical book

The 1604 Book of Common Prayer, (Note: The full title, as given on the cover page of a 1605 printing, was The Booke of Common Prayer, and Administration of the Sacraments, and other Rites and Ceremonies of the Church of England.) often called the Jacobean prayer book or the Hampton Court Book, is the fourth version of the Book of Common Prayer as used by the Church of England. It was introduced during the early English reign of James I as a product of the Hampton Court Conference, a summit between episcopalian, Puritan, and Presbyterian factions. A modest revision of the 1559 prayer book, the Jacobean prayer book became the basis of the 1662 Book of Common Prayer, a still-authorized liturgical book within the Church of England and global Anglicanism.

== Background ==
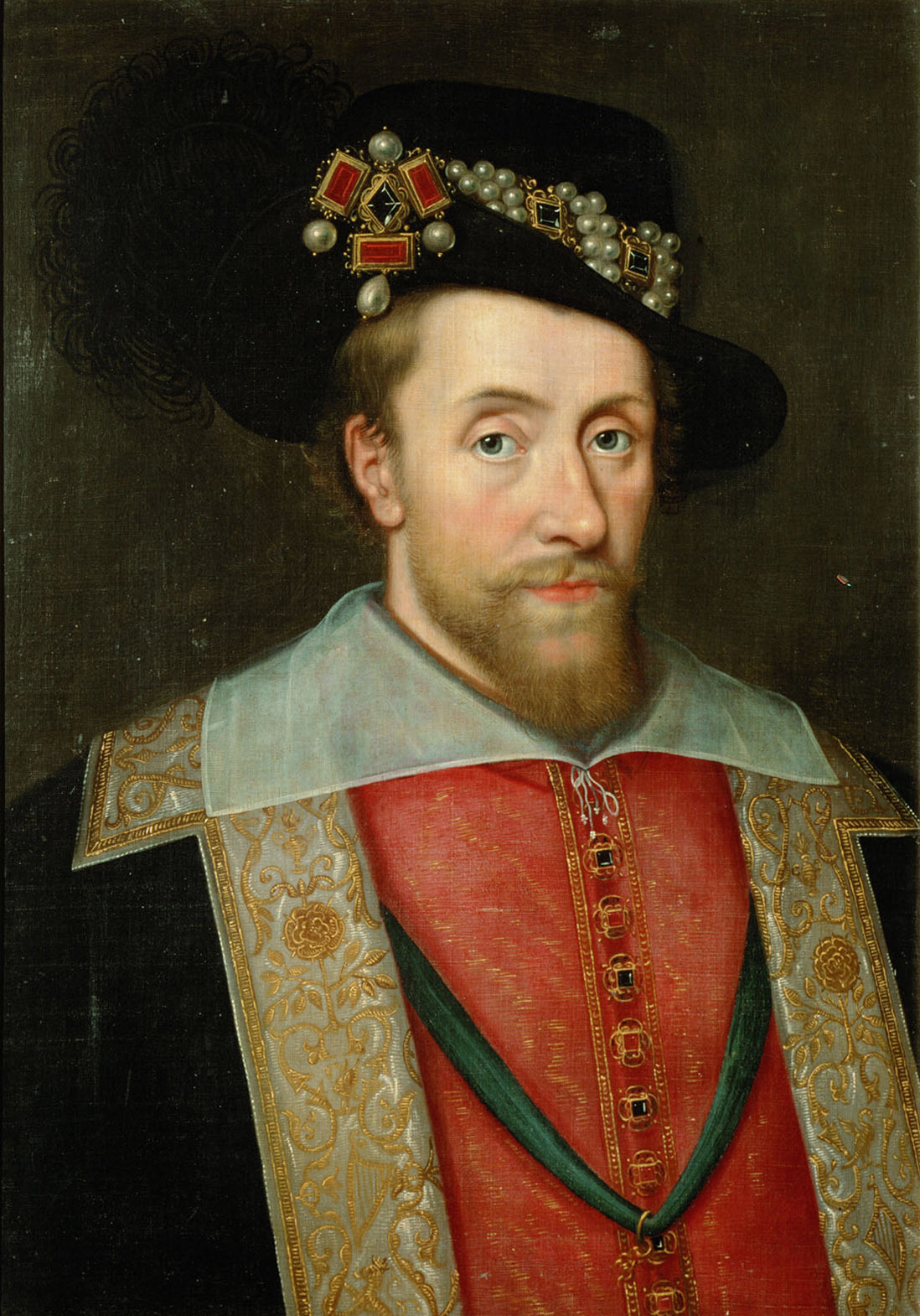
King James VI and I of Scotland and England, c. 1605

The Book of Common Prayer had been introduced as the primary liturgical book of the Church of England post-English Reformation, replacing multiple medieval Catholic texts with vernacular and reformed rites. The 1549 and 1552 prayer books–the latter more reformed than the former–were both largely the work of Thomas Cranmer, the Archbishop of Canterbury. Cranmer, at the behest of Edward VI, had produced the Edwardine Ordinals which were increasingly associated with the prayer book and often bound in with the text.

Following the death of Mary I, who had briefly reintroduced Catholic practices and service books in the Church of England, Elizabeth I assumed the throne and restored the reformed liturgy according to the 1552 model with the 1559 prayer book. Elizabeth I was contending with pressures from Protestant nonconformists, Catholic recusants, and debates such as the Vestarian Controversy within her church. These strains resulted in the Elizabethan Religious Settlement and the Church of England seeking to strike a via media between Protestant and Catholic influences.

The Calvinistic worship in Scotland when James VI sat on the Scottish throne was the Book of Common Order, in conformity to John Knox's Genevan Form of Prayers. According to a rumour in Scotland, Charles, Cardinal of Lorraine had unsuccessfully attempted to convince Mary, Queen of Scots–James's Catholic mother and the cardinal's niece–to adopt the Elizabethan English prayer book. This was poorly received by the staunch Scottish Reformers, who viewed it as little better than Catholic practice. The young King James VI was gifted an English prayer book by Adam Bothwell and copies were sold in Jacobean Edinburgh. However, James opposed the "evil mass said in English" and some Puritans were trying remove even the Calvinist Book of Common Order from public worship. In his Basilikon Doron, James implicitly supported the via media approach.

== Hampton Court Conference and adoption ==
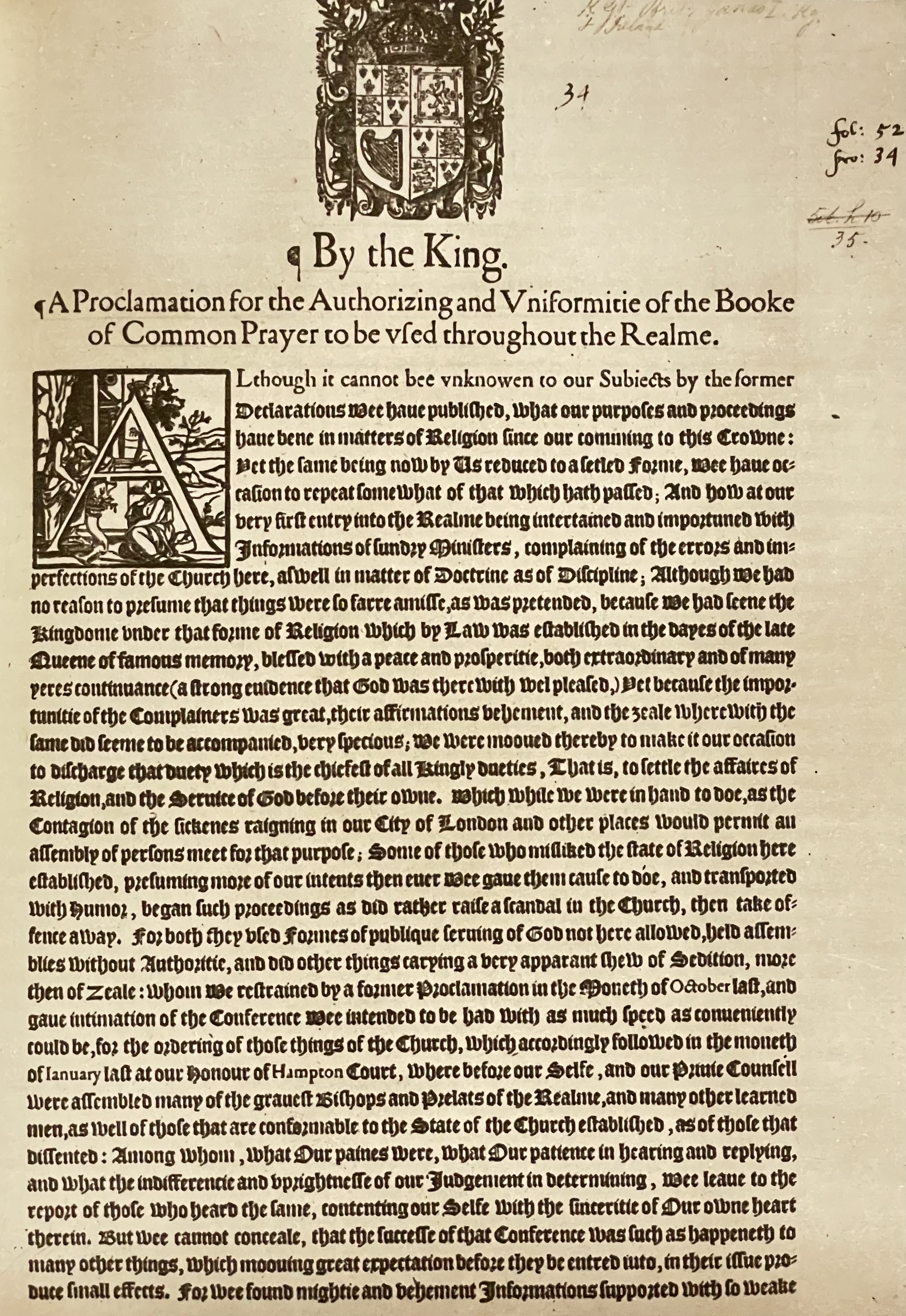
King James I's proclamation on the Hampton Conference prayer book, 5 March 1604

The "godly" Puritans of England, sensing an opportunity for an ally when James VI succeeded Elizabeth on the English throne in 1603 as James I, sought for the new Scottish-born king to bring this pattern of worship with him. Some of this party delivered the Millenary Petition to him while he was travelling from Edinburgh to London. In response, James called a conference at Hampton Court.

Among the personal statements given by the king were his thoughts on baptism. James stated he "utterly disliked" lay baptisms, a practice not unheard of in the decades since the English Reformation. Among those who were recorded as administering lay private baptisms were midwives who feared that a child might die prior to a parish baptism. When the subject of women performing baptisms was raised, James asserted that an ape was a just as able to baptize as women. As such, within the Jacobean prayer book the act of private baptism was regulated, mandating that only a parish minister or "other lawful Minister" could legally perform them, thereby prohibiting all lay baptisms, including those by women.

At the conference, the king announced he "would have one Doctrine and one discipline, one Religion in substance, and in ceremony" and threatened those who would not accept the prayer book that was to be produced as result of the conference. The new prayer book was the 1559 prayer book with the minor changes discussed at the conference and authorized by the king. While James was particularly insistent on conformity to the rubrical and vestry requirements of the new prayer book, the degree of enforcement was largely based on demanding ministers promise to consider these mandates. However, the enforcement of this new prayer book did result in the deprivation of 80 ministers of their benefices.

The extended catechism in the new prayer book negated further provisions for additional instructional document. Further, private devotions like primers no longer required royal initiative. However, a new set of canon law was reviewed. Enacted in March 1604, these canons consolidated earlier Elizabethan directives and were applied to use of the newly approved prayer book.

== Reaction and replacement ==
The reaction to the 1604 prayer book from the Puritan party was sharply critical of the newly authorized liturgy, rejecting both baptismal regeneration and kneeling to receive Communion. These dissenters would distribute pamphlets detailing their disapproval of the prayer book. The ministers in the Diocese of Lincoln issued a petition in 1605 that extensively quoted Reformed divines in opposition to the new prayer book. In 1606, the anonymous Survey of the Book of Common Prayer addressed inconsistencies within the various editions of the prayer book and advocated for the adoption of Scotland's Book of Common Order to unify James's kingdom.

In Scotland, some accepted the prayer book as an element of union with the English under a shared monarch; Scottish ordinations were according the prayer book and, from 1617, it was used daily in the Chapel Royal at Stirling Castle.

William Laud and proponents of his Laudianism school of ritualism and Arminianism were ascendant through the 1620s and 1630s. However, Laud's efforts to introduce his 1637 revised prayer book amplified opposition to Anglican liturgy in Scotland; the Church of Scotland synod abolished both the episcopacy and the prayer book in 1638. Laud's policies in England were also drawing growing Puritan opposition with the Long Parliament spending 1640 and 1641 directly criticizing Laudian practice.

On 13 March 1645, the Puritan Parliament passed legislation that made using the prayer book a penal offence. A single English-language printing of the 1604 prayer book would occur that year, alongside the first Dutch printing. The 1604 prayer book would not be printed again until 1659. During this period, Parliament replaced the prayer book with the Directory of Public Worship.

== Alterations from previous prayer books ==
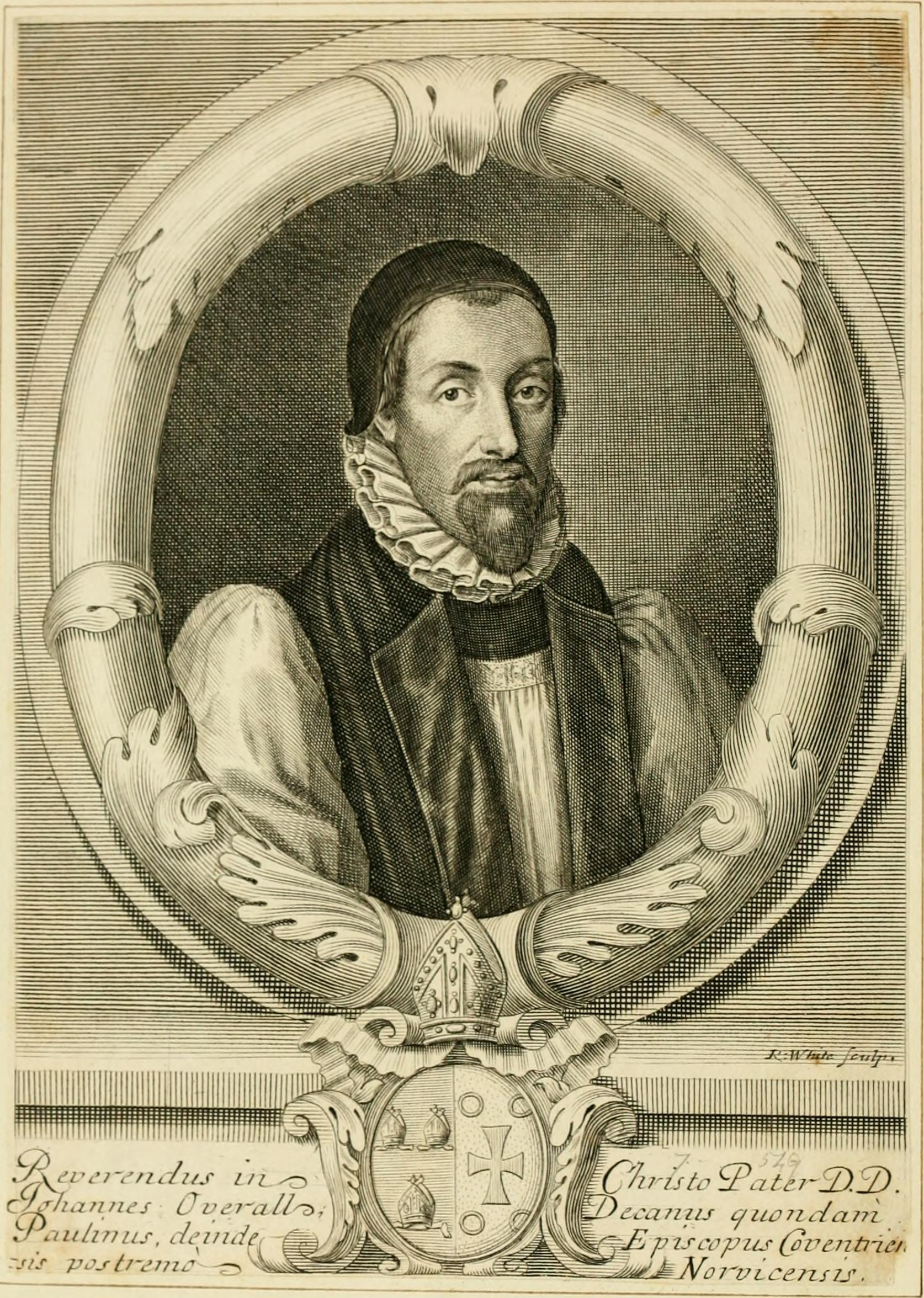
John Overall wrote the new final section of the 1604 prayer book's catechism.

The 1604 prayer book was only a subtle revision relative to other editions of the Book of Common Prayer. Within the offices and liturgies, some minor changes were made. The Prayer for the Royal Family was inserted at the end of the litany, extending the already-long Divine Service, as were six prayers of thanksgiving. The lessons from the Apocrypha were removed. A subtitle of "or Remission of sins" was added to the title of the Absolution; similarly, "Or laying on of hands" was added to the title of Confirmation. As authorized at Hampton Court, the requirement that baptisms be performed by lawful ministers was included. The new final section of the catechism was penned by John Overall, then the Dean of St Paul's.

== Legacy ==
The 1604 prayer book is typically assessed as a "minor" revision of the 1559 prayer book, born primarily in reaction to Puritanism. This view is shared by Anglican liturgical historians Geoffrey Cuming and Brian Cummings. The doctrinal tensions that spurred the 1604 prayer book's creation have been identified as themes in plays by William Shakespeare, particularly Macbeth.

The 1604 prayer book would be the first edition of the Book of Common Prayer translated into Manx (1610), Spanish (1623), and Ancient Greek (1638). A French printing was published in London in 1616 for use on the Channel Islands. The first printing of the 1604 prayer book following the Puritan prohibition in 1645 was within Hamon L'Estrange's 1659 The alliance of divine offices, a comparative volume.

With the Stuart Restoration, the prayer book was restored as the Church of England's liturgy. The new administration broadly supported simply reprinting the 1604 prayer book, but both Laudians and Presbyterians successfully lobbied for revision. A 1619 printing of the Jacobean prayer book would be annotated with amendments by John Cosin, creating what is known as the Durham Book. William Sancroft added these changes to a 1634 copy of the 1604 prayer book, creating what is known as the Fair Copy. The Convocation, encouraged by the 1661 Savoy Conference to adopt a revised prayer book, accepted these changes with a modified 1636 copy, known as the Convocation Book. The adopted version of what became the 1662 Book of Common Prayer notably reintroduced the "Black Rubric".

== See also ==
- Book of Common Prayer (1979)
- Customary (liturgy)
- James VI and I and religious issues
- Pontifical
