= Gregorian Sacramentary (Vat. lat. 3806) =

10th-century illuminated manuscript

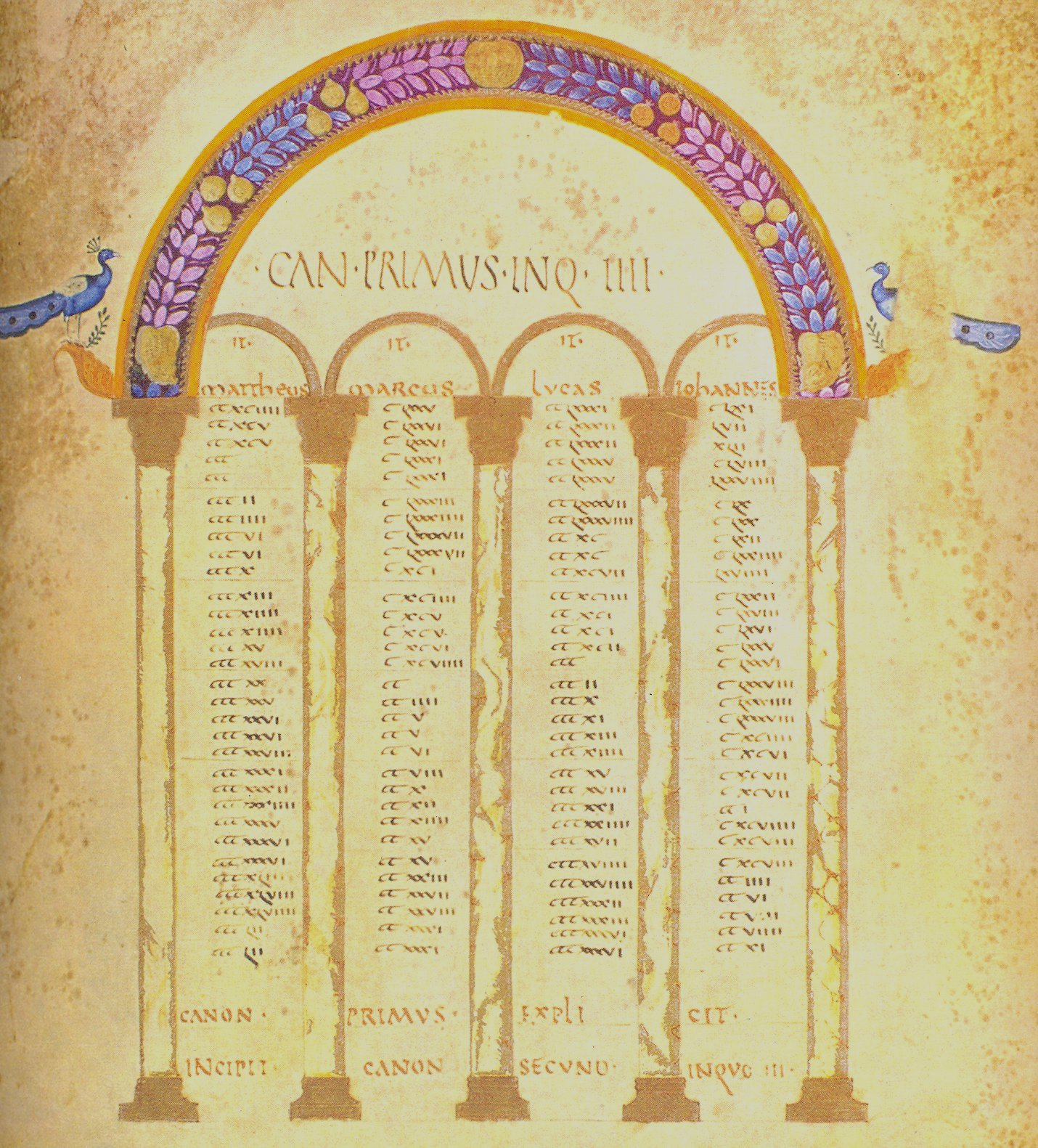
Canon tables from Vat. lat. 3806

Vaticanus latinus 3806 is a 10th-century illuminated manuscript containing the Gregorian Sacramentary. Since the 16th century it has been in the Vatican Library.

It is made up of 307 leaves written in Carolingian minuscule with uncials and incipits. It measures 34 cm by 27 cm. It was produced by an Italian copyist and illuminator, probably at Regensburg, since it includes a calendar with the usage of Fulda Abbey and mass formularies used in the diocese of Regensburg. Due to the archaic style of its first pages, it was once misattributed to saint Gregory, for example by Angelo Rocca in 1593.

The canon tables are on a double page spread at the start (the recto of leaf 1 and the verso of leaf 2), decorated with arches with floral and geometric motifs reminiscent of peacocks (symbols of the resurrection of Christ) and half-palms. The first page is typical of Ottonian or Carolingian art. The incipit to In nomine Domini (folio 11, verso) is ornamented with a gold and silver volute initial on a green and blue background. The following leaves beginning with Per omnia saecula and the monograms for Vere dignum and Te igitur are in gold uncial text on a purple background, surrounded by gold and silver geometric borders. The book concludes (leaf 307, recto) with a pontifical mass dedicated to pope Sylvester II (999-1003).

== Bibliography ==
- Cultural Interplay in the Eighth Century: The Trier Gospels and the Making of a Scriptorium at Echternach by Nancy Netzer (Cambridge University Press, 1994), p 55-56
- (in German) K. Gamber, Liturgie der Regensburger Kirche aus der Agilolfinger- und Karolingerzeit, 1976
