= Book of Advertisements =

Series of enactments concerning Anglican ecclesiastical matters

The Book of Advertisements was a series of enactments concerning Anglican ecclesiastical matters, drawn up by Matthew Parker, Archbishop of Canterbury (1559-1575), with the help of Edmund Grindal, Robert Horne, Richard Cox, and Nicholas Bullingham. It was an attempt to address the vestments controversy.

== Background ==
It is important as connected with the origin of English Nonconformism, and as being one of a group of documents concerning ritual, the import of which became in the nineteenth century the subject of prolonged and inconclusive discussion. On Elizabeth's accession (November, 1558), the Latin services and the Catholic ceremonial were in use. The return from exile of the extreme Protestants, whose doctrinal disputes at Frankfurt had shown the lengths to which they were prepared to go, was viewed with apprehension by those in authority. The opposition of the House of Lords to the Act of Uniformity 1559, rendering obligatory the use of the Elizabethan Book of Common Prayer, made the Government warily follow a policy of compromise.

The rubric authorizing (subject to the proviso in the act, "until other order should be taken by the Queen"), the retention of the Catholic ornaments in use in the second year of Edward VI, was in direct opposition to the tone of the rest of the Prayer-Book, for the communion service was substantially that of the second Prayer-Book of Edward VI (1552), which had been said at a bare table by a surpliced minister. The Reformers' dismay was intense. "Other order", however, was taken by Elizabeth in the "Injunctions", of which the provisions, though opposed to the rubric, became the rule of the Anglican Church. The Reformers were further appeased by the wholesale destruction of Catholic vestments and emblems during the General Visitation (August-October, 1559). The Bishops' Conference held in February, 1560, ended in compromise; the crucifix was rejected, but the cope was retained. Such "rags of the Roman Antichrist" irritated the extreme Reformers, who wanted a worship purified from all taint of 'popery', and they were, therefore, known as "Puritans".

Elizabeth peremptorily called upon the bishops (January, 1564-65) to restore uniformity, and Parker with Grindal and others drew up a "Book of Articles", which he forwarded to William Cecil (3 March, 1564-65). To his intense annoyance they were not approved; but after many delays and alterations they were again submitted to Cecil (28 March, 1566), and published under the title of "Aduertisements, partly for due order in the publique administration of common prayers and usinge the holy sacraments, and partly for the apparell of all persons ecclesiasticall." Elizabeth withheld her formal assent and support; and the bishops were told to exercise their own lawful authority, and so made to bear all the odium their action aroused.

== Book of Advertisements ==
The "Advertisements" recognize that it is impossible to get the cope worn at the communion service, and are content to enforce the use of the surplice. Hence, then, the clerical vestment for all services is the surplice, in the parish church, and the cope for the communion service in cathedral churches. Even that was too much for the liking of the Reformers. Conformity was enforced under penalty of deprivation, thus giving rise to violent dissensions which embittered Parker's closing years, and occasioned the first open separation of Nonconformists from the Church of England.
