= Sacramentary =

Book used by a priest for Catholic liturgical services

In the Western Church of the Early and High Middle Ages, a sacramentary was a book used for liturgical services and the mass by a bishop or priest. Sacramentaries include only the words spoken or sung by him, unlike the missals of later centuries that include all the texts of the mass whether read by the bishop, priest, or others. Also, sacramentaries, unlike missals, include texts for services other than the mass such as ordinations, the consecration of a church or altar, exorcisms, and blessings, all of which were later included in Pontificals and Rituals instead.

In the late 20th century, the word sacramentary was used in the United States and some other English-speaking countries for the English translation of the Roman Missal, particularly those that, like earlier sacramentaries, omitted parts of the Mass not said by the priest.

== Decline of the sacramentary ==
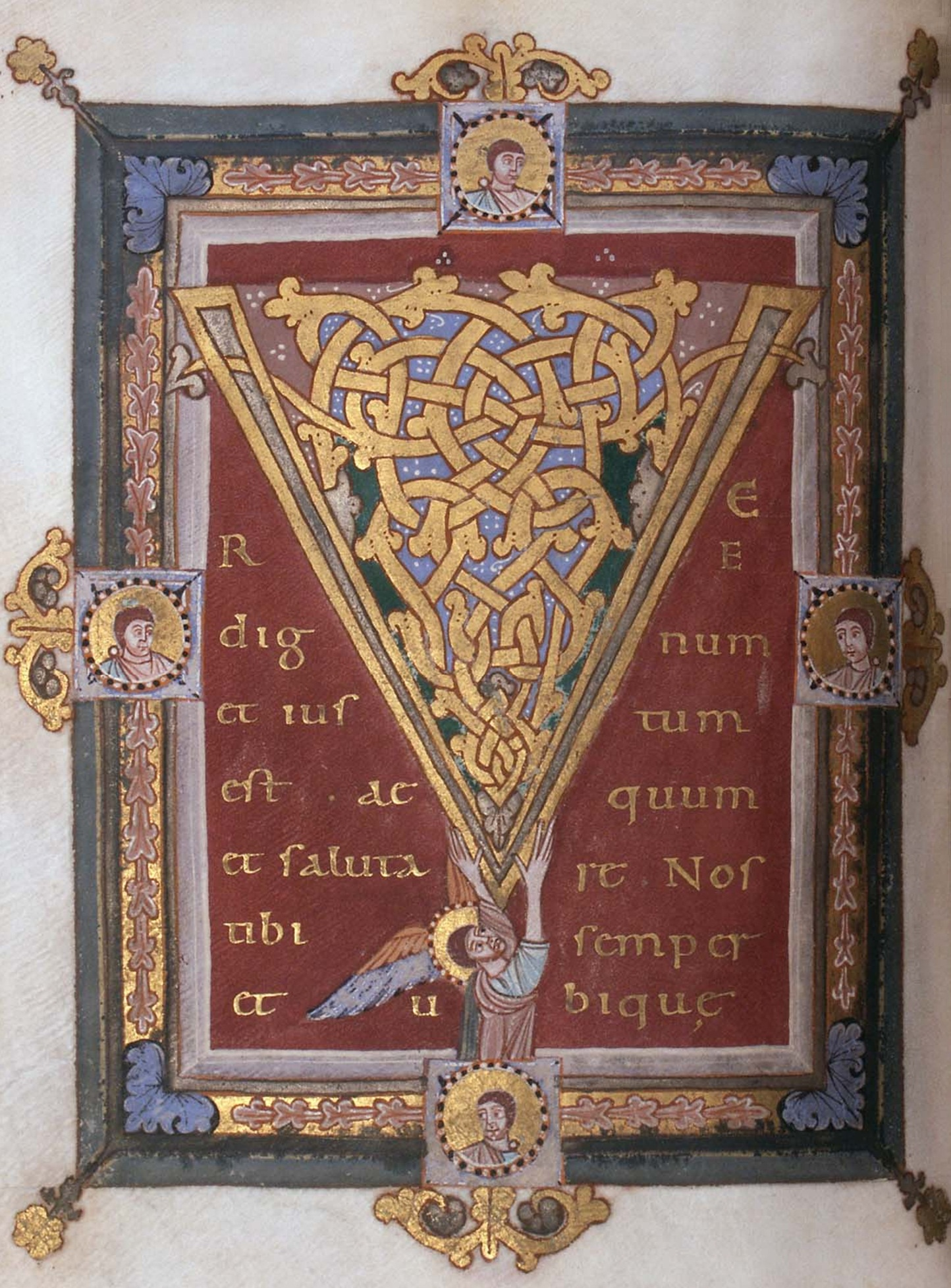
A leaf from the Tyniec Sacramentary, National Library of Poland. Written for the Brauweiler Abbey, it was a kind of sanctuary for the palatines of Lotharingia.

Other books used in the celebration of Mass included the Graduale (texts mainly from the Psalms, with musical notes added), the Evangeliarium or Gospel Book, and the Epistolary with texts from other parts of the New Testament, mainly the Epistles (letters) of Saint Paul.

In late mediaeval times, these books began to be combined, for the use of priests saying Mass without the assistance of a choir and other ministers. This led to the appearance of the Missale plenum ("full or complete Missal") containing all the texts of the Mass (without the music of the choir parts).

Pope Pius V published in 1570 an official version of such a Missal, known as the Roman Missal.

At the behest of the Second Vatican Council, Pope Paul VI greatly increased the amount of Sacred Scripture read at Mass and, to a lesser extent, the prayer formulas. This necessitated a return to having the readings in a separate book, known as the Lectionary. A separate Book of the Gospels, with texts extracted from the Lectionary, is recommended, but is not obligatory. The Roman Missal continues to include elaborate rubrics, as well as antiphons etc., which were not in sacramentaries.

== Textual groups ==
Of the textual groups of sacramentaries of the Roman Rite still extant, either complete or in part, the most important are the three known by the names Leonine, Gelasian, and Gregorian.

=== The Leonine Sacramentary ===
The "Leonine Sacramentary" is the oldest. Only one manuscript of it is known, written in the seventh century. This manuscript was found in the library of the cathedral chapter of Verona, was published by Joseph Bianchini in 1735, and was by him attributed arbitrarily to Pope Leo I (440-61). On the strength of this attribution the book still bears the name Leonine. It represents a pure Roman use with no Gallican elements. But it is not a book compiled for use at the altar. The confusion of its parts shows this. It is a fragment, containing no Canon nor Ordinary of the Mass, but a collection of Propers (Collects, Secrets, Prefaces, Postcommunions, and Orationes super populum), of various Masses with ordination forms, arranged according to the civil year. It begins in the middle of the sixth Mass for April, and ends with a blessing for the font "In ieiunio mensis decimi" (i. e. the winter Ember days). In each month groups of Masses are given, often very large groups, for each feast and occasion. Thus, for instance, in June we find twenty-eight Masses for St Peter and St Paul, one after another, each headed: "Item alia"; there are fourteen for St Lawrence, twenty-three for the anniversary of a bishop's consecration, and so on. Evidently the writer has compiled as many alternative Masses for each occasion as he could find. In many cases he shows carelessness. Many of his Masses in natali episcoporum have nothing at all to do with that anniversary, and are really Masses for Sundays after Pentecost; in the middle of a Mass of St Cornelius and St Cyprian he has put the preface of a Mass of St Euphemia, a Mass for the new civil year is inserted among those for martyrs; Masses for St Stephen's day (26 December) with evident allusions to Christmas are put in August, obviously through a confusion with the feast of the finding of his relics (3 August).

That the collection is Roman is obvious. It is full of local allusions to Rome. For instance, one of the collects to be said by a bishop on the anniversary of his consecration could only be used by the pope of Rome: "Lord God ... who, although Thou dost not cease to enrich with many gifts Thy Church spread throughout the world, nevertheless dost look more favourably upon the see of Thy blessed Apostle Peter, as Thou hast desired that it should be most exalted, etc." The Preface for St John and St Paul remembers that they are buried within "the boundaries of this city"; the Masses of the Patrons of Rome, St Peter and St Paul, continually allude to the city.

Louis Duchesne concluded that the Leonine book is a private collection of prayers copied without much intelligence from the official books at Rome about the year 538. He arrives at this date especially through an allusion in the Secret of a Mass placed in June (but really an Easter Mass), which refers to a recent deliverance from enemies. This allusion he understands to refer to the raising of the siege of Rome by Vitiges and his Goths at Easter-time, 538. Another writer attributed the allusion to Alaric's invasion in 402, and held that the compilation was made between 366 and 461. Another considered that the book was composed under Pope Felix III (483-492). Yet another suggests that the book is a compilation of Roman Masses made in the sixth or seventh century for use in Gaul, so that the composers of Roman books who were at that time introducing the Roman Rite into Gaul might have a source from which to draw their material. He suggests Gregory of Tours (died 594) as possibly the compiler.

=== The Gelasian Sacramentary ===
The "Gelasian Sacramentary" contains everything needed by a priest in charge of a Roman titular or parish church. The archetype, now lost, was likely written in the mid-7th century, possibly for the Church of St Peter in Chains in Rome. It features modifications introduced by Gregory the Great (590–604) in the canon of the Mass (notably the insertion of the prayer Hanc igitur), but does not yet contain either the Agnus Dei made official by Pope Sergius I (r. 687–701) or the Masses for the Thursdays in Lent added by Pope Gregory II (r. 715–731).

The oldest extant copy of the sacramentary, a book now often called the Old Gelasian Sacramentary, Vatican Reg. lat. 316, was made in the 7th or early 8th century for use in the abbey of St Denis at Paris. It includes five interpolated sections that introduce liturgical practices of Gaul from the time the manuscript was copied, but the interpolations are easily distinguished from the Roman sections of the text.

The Old Gelasian Sacramentary consists of three books. Book I includes masses for feasts and Sundays from Christmas Eve to the octave of Pentecost (there were at the time no special masses for the season after Pentecost), together with ordinations, prayers for all the rites of the catechumenate, blessing of the font and oil at the Easter Vigil, dedication of churches, and reception of nuns. Book II includes the Proper of Saints throughout the year, the Common of Saints, and the Advent Masses. Book III includes a great number of masses marked simply "For Sunday" (i.e., any Sunday), the Canon of the Mass, what would today be called votive masses (e.g., for travellers, in time of trouble, for kings, and so on), masses for the dead, some blessings (of holy water, fruits, trees and so on), and various prayers for special occasions.

The Gelasian Sacramentary was revised in the 8th century at the prompting of Pepin the Short, work that was likely undertaken at Flavigny Abbey and completed between 760 and 770. The sacramentary, now lost, is sometimes called the Sacrementary of King Pepin. The family of manuscripts copied from it are generally called Frankish Gelasian or Eighth-Century Gelasian sacramentaries. The most faithful copy is considered to be the Sacramentary of Gellone, Bibliothèque nationale de France MS Latin 12048, copied around 780. About a dozen other manuscripts of the Frankish Gelasian type are extant.

The Frankish Gelasian is a meticulous re-working of material from the Old Gelasian Sacramentary and certain other sacramentaries of the Gregorian type usually called Type 2 Gregorian (known today only from a single extant manuscript, the Paduense Sacramentary, Padua, Bibl. Cap., cod. D.47). The Gellone Sacramentary is divided into two parts. The first part includes the Temporal and Sanctoral in one continuous series, following the usual Gregorian structure, with the canon of the mass given at Easter. The second part includes the episcopal blessings and other episcopal material, prayers for monastic use, the ordo of baptism, and a summary of the Martyrologium Hieronymianum.

The attribution to Pope Gelasius (r. 492–496) likely derives from the Liber Pontificalis, which states that Gelasius wrote various prefaces to the sacraments and prayers, but Gelasius did not compile the later sacramentary that bears his name.

Alongside the sacramentaries of the Gelasian type, all of them hybrids of Roman and Frankish practices, several older Gallican sacramentaries survive from the Merovingian period, all based on a mix of Gallican and some Irish traditions with little emphasis on Roman practices.

=== The Gregorian Sacramentary ===
We know most about the third of these books, the so-called "Gregorian Sacramentary", which is in three parts:

1. The Ordinary of the Mass;
2. the Propers for the year beginning with Christmas Eve. They follow the ecclesiastical year; the feasts of saints (days of the month in the civil year) are incorporated in their approximate places in this. The Roman Stations are noted. There are still no Masses for the Sundays after Epiphany and Pentecost;
3. the prayers for ordinations.

Charlemagne, anxious to introduce the Roman Rite into his kingdom, wrote to Pope Hadrian I between the years 781 and 791 asking him to send him the service-book of the Roman Church. The book sent by the pope is the nucleus of the Gregorian Sacramentary. It was then copied a great number of times, so that there are many versions of it, all containing additions made by the various scribes. The original book sent by Hadrian to Charlemagne is easily distinguished from the different editions because the first to supplement Hadrian's book from other sources was a conscientious person who carefully noted where his additions begin, adding a note: "So far the preceding book of Sacraments is certainly that edited by the holy Pope Gregory." In the earlier versions we may take the first part, down to this note, as being the book sent by Hadrian.

However, its attribution to Pope Gregory I (590-604) shows us that Gregory did much to reform the liturgy. A constant tradition ascribes such a work to him, as to Gelasius. John the Deacon (eighth century) in his Life of Gregory expresses this tradition: "He collected the Sacramentary of Gelasius in one book, leaving out much, changing little, adding something." Pope Adrian himself, in sending the book to Charlemagne, said that it was composed "by our holy predecessor, the divinely speaking Pope Gregory". The fact that the essential foundation of this sacramentary goes back to St Gregory, indeed to long before his time, is certain. We do not doubt that he made such changes as those that are acclaimed to him by his biographer, and that these changes stand in this book. But his work has not remained untouched, additions have been made to it since his time. For example, the addition of his own feast as well as other feasts that had not been celebrated before the seventh century. The book sent by Pope Adrian to Charlemagne has gone through inevitable development over the centuries since Gregory finished it. It represents the Roman Rite of the time when it was sent - the eighth century. In the Frankish kingdom, copies were made for churches and additions of other Masses and prayers were added according to the specific church's requests. These additions were taken partly from the Gelasian book, partly from Gallican sources. Though at first the additions were carefully distinguished from the original book, they were eventually incorporated in it. Between the ninth and eleventh centuries the book, including the additions, returned to Rome, took the place of the original pure Roman Rite, and so became the foundation of the Roman Missal.

== Specific manuscripts ==
A non-comprehensive list of significant sacramentaries from the 7th to the 13th centuries.

=== 6th/7th century ===
- Verona Sacramentary or Leonine Sacramentary, the "Veronense" or "Leonianum", Verona, Biblioteca Capitolare Cod. LXXXV (alt 80), attributed to Pope Leo the Great (440-461) but actually copied from Roman pamphlets (libelli missarum) of the 5th and 6th centuries. This is the only manuscript of this type.
- Old Gelasian Sacramentary, Vatican Reg. lat. 316, attributed to Pope Gelasius I (492-496) but actually originating in the 6th century and dating from the early 8th century in its current form. This is the only witness to the presbyterial liturgy of Rome in the 6th century, with interpolated sections that introduce liturgical practices of Gaul from the time the manuscript was copied.
- Missale Francorum, Vatican Reg. lat. 257 (7th century), a fragment of an uncial codex of a sacramentary similar to the Old Gelasian. The fragment includes eleven masses. Although Roman in form, it is not free from Gallican interpolation, especially in the rubrics.

=== 7th century ===
- Sacramentary of Pope Gregory the Great, a conjecturally reconstructed early sacramentary, the archetype of the Gregorian family of sacramentaries
- The "Ravenna Roll", Lugano, Archivio del Principe Pio, no number. It is "extremely difficult" to determine the dates of this fragment, which contains about 40 prayers now associated with Advent. It may originate in the 5th century, in the time of Peter Chrysologus; the extant fragment is from the 7th century.
- "Missale Gallicanum" or so-called "Missale Gothicum", Vatican Reg. Lat. 317 (c. 700), a sacramentary of the Merovingian-Gallican type
- "Missale Gallicanum Vetus", Vatican Pal. lat. 493 (c. 700), a sacramentary of the Merovingian-Gallican type possibly related to the Missale Gothicum
- Sacramentary of Padua, Padua, Biblioteca Capitulare cod. D.47 (between 659 and 681). This mid-9th-century copy is the only extant example of the "Type 2 Gregorian" sacramentary

=== 8th century ===
- Sacramentary of Bobbio, Bibliothèque nationale de France MS Latin 13246 (first quarter of the 8th century), a sacramentary of the Merovingian-Gallican type
- Sacramentary of King Pepin (between 760 and 770), now lost, the archetype sacramentary of the Frankish Gelasian type
- Sacramentary of Gellone, Bibliothèque nationale de France MS Latin 12048 (c. 780), the most faithful witness to the Frankish Gelasian type
- The Gregorian "Hadrianum", Cambrai, Médiathèque d'agglomération MS 164, a copy of the sacramentary of papal liturgies sent to Charlemagne by Pope Hadrian I between 784 and 791. The copy was produced in 811–812 for Hildoard, bishop of Cambrai, and is likely a direct copy of the now-lost original.
- Sacramentary of Rheinau, Zürich Zentralbibliothek MS Rh. 30 (c. 795/800), a sacramentary of the Frankish Gelasian type
- Sacramentary of St. Gall, the Gelasian Remedius-Sacramentary, St. Gallen, Stiftsbibliothek Cod. Sang. 348 (c. 800), a sacramentary of the Frankish Gelasian type
- Sacramentary of Angoulême, Bibliothèque nationale de France Lat. 816, a sacramentary of the Frankish Gelasian type
- "Phillipps Sacramentary", Berlin, Staatsbibliothek zu Berlin Phill. 1667 (8th or 9th century), a sacramentary of the composite Gelasian-Gregorian type

=== 9th century ===
- Sacramentary of Mainz, Bodleian Library MS Auct. D. 1. 20 (2nd quarter of the 9th century)
- Sacramentary of Marmoutier, sometimes called the Sacramentary of Autun or "Codex Augustodunensis", Autun, Bibliothèque municipale MS 19 (formerly 19 bis) (c. 845—850), a sacramentary of the Gregorian Hadrianum type, with the "Preface" or Praefatiuncula (possibly written by Alcuin) and other supplements
- Sacramentary of Bishop Drogo, Bibliothèque nationale de France MS lat. 9428 (between 826 and 855)
- "Codex Ottobonianus", Vatican Library Ott. lat. 313 (before 850), a sacramentary of the Gregorian Hadrianum type, with the "Preface" or Praefatiuncula (possibly written by Alcuin) and other supplements
- "Codex Reginae 337", Vatican Library Reg. lat. 337 (before 850), a sacramentary of the Gregorian Hadrianum type that lacks the Praefatiuncula but includes other supplements
- Sacramentary of Amiens, Bibliothèque nationale de France MS lat. 9432 (second half of the 9th century)
- Sacramentary of Charles the Bald, Bibliothèque nationale de France MS lat. 1141 (c. 870), a fragment of an elaborately illuminated sacramentary.
- Sacramentary of Nonantola, the "Nonantolensis", Bibliothèque nationale de France MS lat. 2292 (c. 870), a sacramentary of the Gregorian Hadrianum type
- Sacramentary of Echternach, Bibliothèque nationale de France MS lat. 9433 (between 895 and 898)
- Sacramentary of Monza, Monza, Biblioteca Capitolare Cod. F. 1/101 (CXXVI) (9th or 10th century), a sacramentary of the composite Gelasian-Gregorian type
- Sacramentary of Tours (St Martin's Basilica), two substantially identical sacramentaries bound together in great disorder across two manuscripts, Tours, Bibliothèque Municipale 184, and Bibliothèque nationale de France lat. 9430 (late 9th century); see the reconstruction by Jean Deshusses, Le sacramentaire grégorien, vol. 3, pp. 55–8
- Sacramentary of Pamelius, an early-modern edition of now-lost manuscripts from Western Germany, Belgium, and the Netherlands, published by Jacob van Pamele in 1571

=== 10th century ===
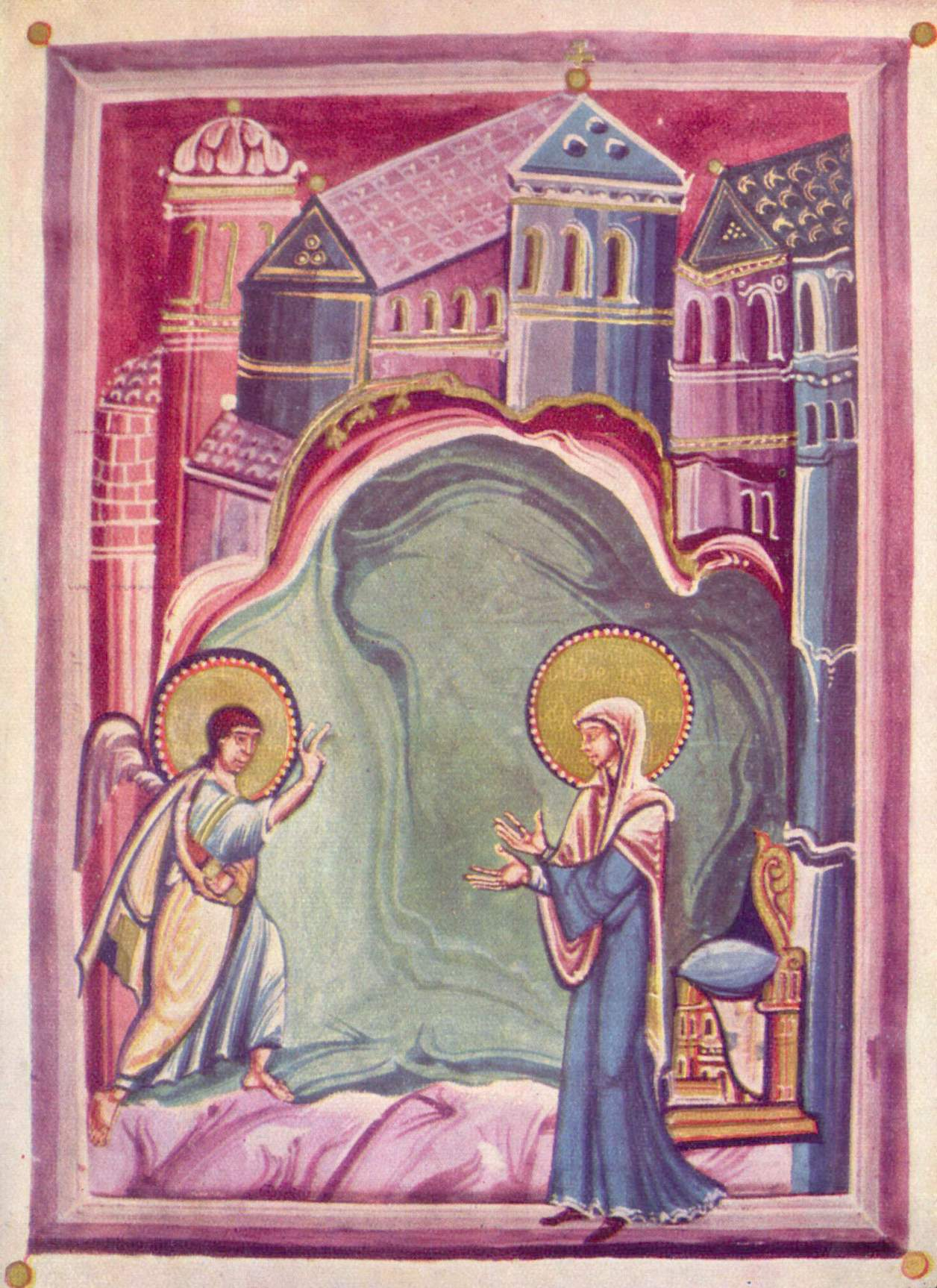
Sacramentary of St Gereon

- Sacramentary of Petershausen Abbey (near Reichenau), Universitätsbibliothek Heidelberg, Cod. Sal. IXb (c. 980)
- Sacramentary of Fulda, Göttingen, Universitätsbibliothek cod. theol. 231 (c. 975), the most important witness to the composite Gelasian-Gregorian sacramentaries that emerged in the 10th century. This is the first of a series of sacramentaries copied and decorated in Fulda for export.
- Sacramentary of Fulda, München, Bayerische Staatsbibliothek Clm 10077 (between 960 and 999)
- Sacramentary of St Gereon, Bibliothèque nationale de France Lat. 817
- Sacramentary of Ratoldus, Bibliothèque nationale de France Lat. 12052, arguably compiled at Corbie Abbey in France
- Sacramentary of Lorsch, Vatican Library Pal. lat. 495 (late 10th century)
- Leofric Missal, Bodleian Library MS Bodl. 579 (10th and 11th centuries). The earliest part of this composite manuscript is a sacramentary from the 10th century
- Sacramentary of Biasca (Ambrosian Rite), Biblioteca Ambrosiana A 24 bis inf. (late 9th or early 10th century)
- Sacramentary of Bishop Warmund of Ivrea, Biblioteca Capitolare di Ivrea MS 31 (late 9th or early 10th century)
- Sacramentary of Regensburg, now Vat. lat. 3806, illuminated

=== 11th century ===
- Sacramentary of Figeac
- Sacramentary of Venice
- Sacramentary of Salzburg
- Sacramentary of the Abbey of Saint-Wandrille
- Sacramentary of Regensburg
- Sacramentary of Minden or of Bishop Sigebert (1022–1036)
- Sacramentary of Reichenau, Bibliothèque nationale de France Lat. 18005 (11th century)
- Tyniec Sacramentary, Kraków, Biblioteka Narodowa Rps BOZ 8 (between 1072 and 1075)

=== 12th century ===
- "Second" Sacramentary of Tours (Cathedral of Tours), Bibliothèque nationale de France NAL 1589 (11th or 12th century)
- Sacramentary of Ratmann, Dom-Museum Hildesheim DS 37 (1159)
- Sacramentary of Millstatt, Klagenfurt, Kärntner Landesarchiv, Geschichtsverein, Cod. 6/35 (1170s or 1180s)

=== 13th century ===
- Sacramentary of Abbot Berthold (Weingarten Abbey) - 1217
- Sacramentary of Hainricus Sacrista - c. 1220

In addition:

- Sacramentary of St Paul
- Sacramentary of Brescia
- Sacramentary of Essen
- Sacramentary of Chantilly
- Sacramentary of Jena
- Sacramentary of Prague
- Sacramentary of Beauvais
- Sacramentary of Remedius - Gelasian type
- Sacramentary of Maria Laach

=== Benedictional ===
The benedictional is a related type of book containing a collection of benedictions or blessings in use in the Roman Catholic Church, essentially collected from those in sacramentaries.

The Anglo-Saxon Benedictional of St. Æthelwold is the most famous of the relatively infrequent illuminated manuscript examples, which are mostly Early Medieval.

== See also ==
- Customary (liturgy)
- Preconciliar rites after the Second Vatican Council
- Pre-Tridentine Mass
- Pontifical
- Ordinal (liturgy)
