= Usage of Paris =

Medieval Christian liturgical tradition

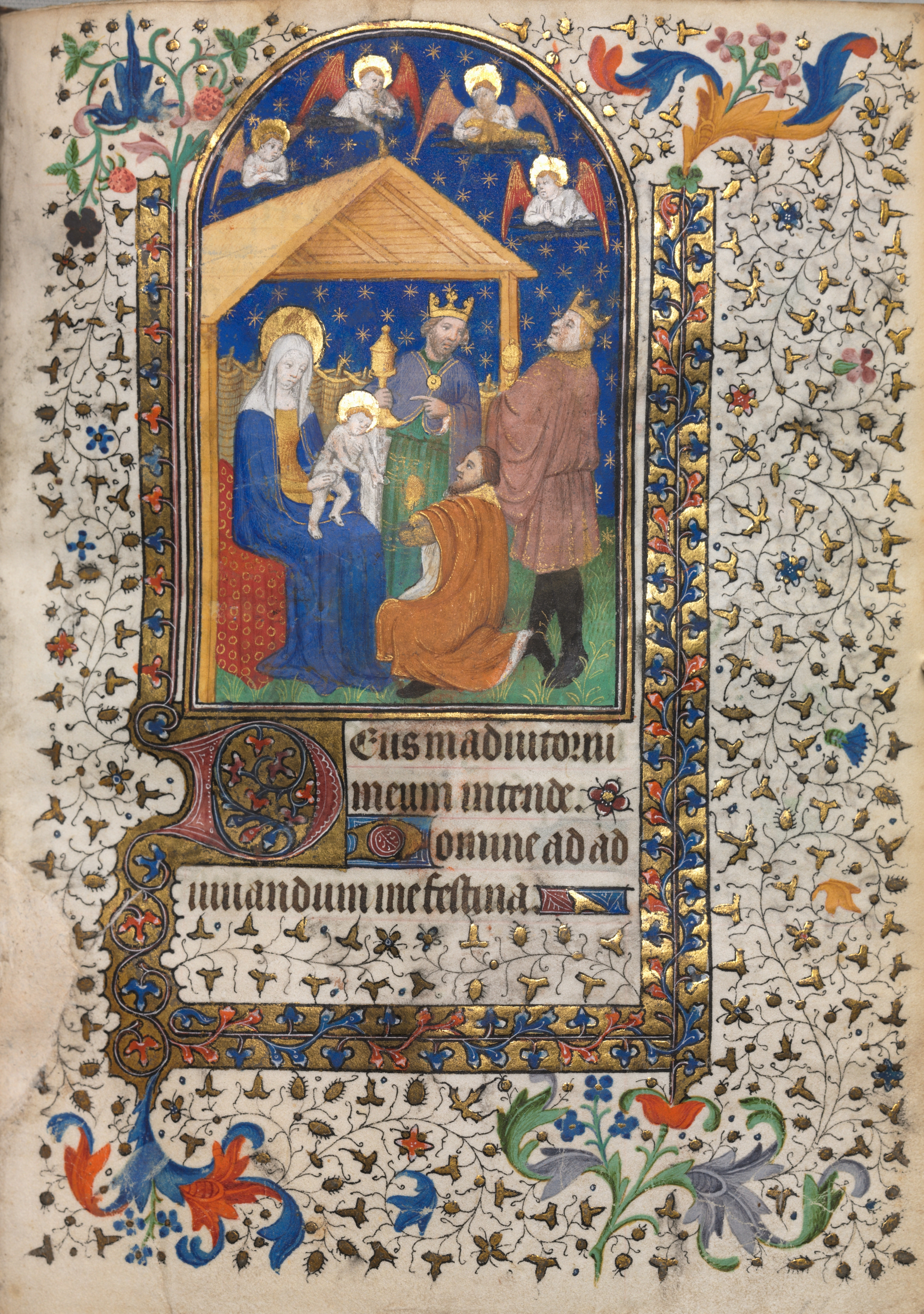
Adoration of the Magi from a Parisian book of hours by the Boucicaut Master

The usage (or use) of Paris was the liturgical usage of any of the churches and monasteries of medieval Paris, especially as adopted for usage outside Paris. The most important usage was that of the cathedral, Notre-Dame de Paris. The usages of the itinernant royal court and of the Burgundian court followed that of Notre-Dame with slight variations. The usage of the royal chapel of Sainte-Chapelle was also based on that of Notre-Dame, although significant differences had emerged by 1471. It was the basis for the usage of the various Saintes-Chapelles founded throughout the kingdom.

The term horae ad usum Parisiensem refers to a book of hours following one of these usages. John, Duke of Berry, commissioned at least two such books:

- Petites Heures du Duc de Berry
- Grandes Heures du Duc de Berry
