= Use (liturgy) =

Distinct practices in Christian liturgy

A use, also commonly usage (Latin: usum) and recension, within Christian liturgy is a set of particular texts or customs distinct from other practitioners of a broader liturgical ritual family, typically on the basis of locality or religious order. Especially prevalent within the Latin liturgical rites of the Middle Ages, few significant uses persisted following a general suppression of these variations by Pope Pius V in the 16th century. The word "use" is most commonly applied to distinct practices branching from the Roman Rite, though it and "recension" can be applied in variations of other ritual families, such as the Ruthenian recension of the Byzantine Rite, the Maronite Use of the West Syriac Rite and the Syro-Malabar Use of the East Syriac Rite. In the historic context of the Scottish Episcopal Church, "usage" refers to certain aspects of the Eucharistic liturgy valued by some nonjurors.

== Definition ==
While the word "rite" is often applied not only to ritual families but to the particular churches and denominations that use them, the word "use" has been considered a more precise term when liturgical variations do not deviate enough to justify distinguishing them as separate rites. The degree of discrepancy among uses within the same rite can vary widely; the Glagolitic Use was primarily an unmodified translation of the Roman Rite Tridentine Mass into Old Church Slavonic, while the modern Anglican Use of the Roman Rite has an assortment of liturgical books blending Catholic and Anglican ritual.

Often, uses develop regionally. A use would often develop from the particular needs or traditions of a diocese, with some gaining broader adoption. In medieval England, "uses" were often synonymous with "customs" and provided aesthetic character and more specific ceremonial instruction not necessarily provided in other sources. Among these was the Sarum Use, which originated in the Diocese of Salisbury and was gradually accepted in other English dioceses. A "great diversity" of uses survived the initial proliferation of the printed service books, with no consistent form of the Mass and Divine Office existing in medieval Britain. The preface of the Book of Common Prayer published as a result of the English Reformation identified multiple liturgical uses and declared that, from the publication of the prayer book, "all the whole realm shall have but one Use".

"Recension" is often in reference to variations of the Byzantine Rite. Among the ritual recensions identified within this tradition are that of the Ruthenian Catholics, Russian Old recension, Slavic, and Melkite Catholics. Variations of the Byzantine Rite, with minor changes to each's ceremonial, can also be referred to as "usages".

=== Anglican "usages" ===
Following the Glorious Revolution, Anglican dissenters known as nonjurors separated from the Church of Scotland and were established as the independent Scottish Episcopal Church in the early 18th century. Some members of this body sought to recover four practices for the Eucharistic liturgy they termed "usages": the mixed chalice, the invocation of the Holy Spirit, transfer of the prayer of oblation, and prayers for the dead. After reprinting the 1549 Book of Common Prayer in 1717, a new service book that incorporated the Usages was produced the next year. Those who worshipped according to this and succeeding texts were known as "Usagers" and were at odds with "Non-Usager" Scottish Episcopalians. During the 19th century, ritualists in the Church of England who had been influenced by the Oxford Movement adopted certain ceremonial "usages" for celebration of the 1662 prayer book Communion service. These "usages"–which the ritualists maintained were mandated by the Ornaments Rubric–included eastward-facing celebration, candles and crosses on the altar, vestments, and incense.

== See also ==
- Christian worship
- Customary (liturgy), a book containing details on practices particular to a use
- Eastern Catholic liturgy
- Pontifical
- Protestant liturgy
- Usage of Paris
