= Custom (Catholic canon law) =

Repeated and constant performance of certain acts

In the canon law of the Catholic Church, custom is the repeated and constant performance of certain acts for a defined period of time, which, with the approval of the competent legislator, thereby acquire the force of law. A custom is an unwritten law introduced by the continuous acts of the faithful with the consent of the legitimate legislator. Historically, some ritual and regulatory customs would be recorded in texts known as customaries for use both within particular cathedrals and religious orders or for dissemination among associated ecclesial communities.

Custom may be considered as a fact and as a law. As a fact, it is simply the frequent and free repetition of acts concerning the same thing; as a law, it is the result and consequence of that fact. Hence its name, which is derived from consuesco or consuefacio and denotes the frequency of the action.

In order for custom to become a source of law, it must be approved by the competent legislator. Custom in canon law is not simply created by the people through their constant performance of a certain act, but it is the constant performance of a certain act, with the intention of making a custom, which is approved by the competent legislator, thereby acquiring the force of law. This is because of the Catholic ecclesiological teaching on the constitution of the Catholic Church, which states that Christ constituted the Church by divine delegation of power to the hierarchical authorities; the Church was not created by the consent of the governed, but by the direct will of Christ.

== Divisions of custom ==
1. Considered according to extent, a custom is universal, if received by the whole Church; or general (though under another aspect, particular), if observed in an entire country or province; or special, if it obtains among smaller but perfect societies; or most special (specialissima) if among private individuals and imperfect societies. The last-named cannot elevate a custom into a legitimate law.
2. Considered according to duration, custom is prescriptive or non-prescriptive. The former is subdivided, according to the amount of time requisite for a custom of fact to become a custom of law, into ordinary (i. e. ten or forty years) and immemorial.
3. Considered according to method of introduction, a custom is judicial or extrajudicial. The first is that derived from forensic usage or precedent. This is of great importance in ecclesiastical circles, as the same prelates are generally both legislators and judges, i. e. the pope and bishops. Extrajudicial custom is introduced by the people, but its sanction becomes the more easy the larger the number of learned or prominent men who embrace it.
4. Considered in its relation to law, a custom is according to law (juxta legem) when it interprets or confirms an existing statute; or beside the law (prœter legem) when no written legislation on the subject exists; or contrary to law (contra legem) when it derogates from or abrogates a statute already in force.

== Legal conditions for custom ==
The true efficient cause of an ecclesiastical custom, in as far as it constitutes law, is solely the consent of the competent legislating authority. All church laws imply spiritual jurisdiction, which resides in the hierarchy alone, and, consequently, the faithful have no legislative power, either by divine right or canonical statute. Therefore, the express or tacit consent of the church authority is necessary to give a custom the force of an ecclesiastical law. This consent is denominated legal when, by general statute and antecedently, reasonable customs receive approbation. Ecclesiastical custom differs, therefore, radically from civil custom. For, though both arise from a certain conspiration and accord between the people and the lawgivers, yet in the Church the entire juridical force of the custom is to be obtained from the consent of the hierarchy while in the civil state, the people themselves are one of the real sources of the legal force of custom. Custom, as a fact, must proceed from the community, or at least from the action of the greater number constituting the community. These actions must be free, uniform, frequent, and public, and performed with the intention of imposing an obligation. The usage, of which there is question. must also be of a reasonable nature. Custom either introduces a new law or abrogates an old one. But a law, by its very concept, is an ordination of reason, and so no law can be constituted by an unreasonable custom. Moreover, as an existing statute cannot be revoked except for just cause, it follows that the custom which is to abrogate the old law must be reasonable, for otherwise the requisite justice would be wanting. A custom, considered as a fact, is unreasonable when it is contrary to divine law, positive or natural; or when it is prohibited by proper ecclesiastical authority; or when it is the occasion of sin and opposed to the common good.

A custom must also have a legitimate prescription. Such prescription is obtained by a continuance of the act in question during a certain length of time. No canonical statute has positively defined what this length of time is, and so its determination is left to the wisdom of canonists. Authors generally hold that for the legalizing of a custom in accordance with or beside the law a space of ten years is sufficient; while for a custom contrary to law many demand a lapse of forty years. The reason given for the necessity of so long a space as forty years is that the community will only slowly persuade itself of the opportuneness of abrogating the old and embracing the new law. The opinion, however, which holds that ten years suffices to establish a custom even contrary to the law may be safely followed. In practice the Roman Congregations scarcely tolerate or permit any custom, even an immemorial one, contrary to the sacred canons. In the introduction of a law by prescription, it is assumed that the custom was introduced in good faith, or at least through ignorance of the opposite law. If, however, a custom be introduced through connivance, good faith is not required, for, as a matter of fact, bad faith must, at least in the beginning, be presupposed. As, however, when there is question of connivance, the proper legislator must know of the formation of the custom and yet does not oppose it when he could easily do so, the contrary law is then supposed to be abrogated directly by the tacit revocation of the legislator. A custom which is contrary to good morals or to the natural or divine positive law is always to be rejected as an abuse, and it can never be legalized.

== Force of custom ==
The effects of a custom vary with the nature of the act which has caused its introduction, i. e. according as the act is in accord with (juxta), or beside (præter), or contrary (contra) to, the written law.

1. The first does not constitute a new law in the strict sense of the word; its effect is rather to confirm and strengthen an already existing statute or to interpret it. Hence the axiom of jurists: Custom is the best interpreter of laws. Custom, indeed, considered as a fact, is a witness to the true sense of a law and to the intention of the legislator. If, then, it bring about that a determinate sense be obligatorily attached to an indeterminate legal phrase, it takes rank as an authentic interpretation of the law and as such acquires true binding-force. Wernz refers to this same principle as explaining why the oft-recurring phrase in ecclesiastical documents, "the existing discipline of the Church, approved by the Holy See", indicates a true norm and an obligatory law.
2. The second species of custom has the force of a new law, binding upon the entire community both in the internal and external forum. Unless a special exception can be proved, the force of such a custom extends to the introduction of prohibitive, permissive, and preceptive statutes, as well as to penal and nullifying enactments.
3. Thirdly, a custom contrary to law has the effect of abrogating, entirely or in part, an already existing ordinance, for it has the force of a new and later law. As regards penal ecclesiastical legislation, such a custom may directly remove an obligation in conscience, while the duty of submission to the punishment for transgressing the old precept may remain, provided the punishment in question be not a censure nor so severe a chastisement as necessarily presupposes a grave fault. On the other hand, this species of custom may also remove the punishment attached to a particular law, while the law itself remains obligatory as to its observance.

Immemorial custom, provided it be shown that circumstances have so changed as to make the custom reasonable, has power to abrogate or change any human law, even though a clause had been originally added to it forbidding any custom to the contrary. To immemorial custom is also attached the unusual force of inducing a presumption of the existence of an Apostolic privilege, provided the said privilege be not reckoned among abuses, and the holder of the presumed privilege be a person legally capable of acquiring the thing in question without first obtaining a special and express Apostolic permission for it. Ferraris notes that no immemorial custom, if it be not confirmed by Apostolic privilege, express or presumptive, can have any force for the abrogation of ecclesiastical liberties or immunities, inasmuch as both canon and civil law declare such custom to be unreasonable by its very nature. In general, it may be said that a valid custom, in both the constitution and the abrogation of laws, produces the same effects as a legislative act.

== Concerning Tridentine decrees ==
A special question has been raised by some canonists as to whether the laws of the Council of Trent may be changed or abrogated by custom, even if immemorial, or whether all such contrary customs should not be rejected as abuses. Some of these writers restrict their denial of the value of contrary customs to ordinary, some also to immemorial ones. It is unquestionably a general principle in canon law, that custom can change the disciplinary statutes even of œcumenical councils. The main reason for rejecting this principle in favour of the Tridentine enactments in particular is that any contrary custom would certainly be unreasonable and therefore unjustifiable. It is by no means evident, however, that all such contrary customs must necessarily be unreasonable, as is plain from the fact that some authors allow and others deny the value of immemorial customs in the premises, even when they agree in reprobating the force of ordinary customs.

As a matter of fact, there is no decree of the Sacred Congregation of the Council which declares, absolutely and generally, that all customs contrary to the laws of the Council of Trent are invalid. Moreover, the Tribunal of the Rota has allowed the force of immemorial customs contrary to the disciplinary decrees of Trent, and the Sacred Congregation of the Council has at least tolerated them in secondary matters. A salient instance of the Roman official view is the statement of the Holy Office (11 March 1868) that the Tridentine decree on clandestine marriages, even after promulgation, was abrogated in some regions by contrary custom (Collect. S. C. de Prop. Fid., n. 1408). The confirmation of the Council of Trent by Pope Pius IV (26 Jan., 1564; 17 Feb., 1565) abolishes all contrary existing customs; however, the papal letters contain nothing to invalidate future customs. Owing to the comparatively recent date of the Council of Trent and the urgency of the Holy See that its decrees be observed, it is not easy for a contrary custom to arise, but whenever the conditions of a legitimate custom are fulfilled, there is no reason why the Tridentine decrees should be more immune than those of any other œcumenical council.

== Cessation of custom ==
Any custom is to be rejected whose existence as such cannot be proved legally. A custom is a matter of fact, and therefore its existence must be tested in the same way as the existence of other alleged facts is tested. In this particular, the decrees of synods, the testimony of the diocesan ordinary and of other persons worthy of credence are of great value. Proofs are considered the stronger the more closely they approximate public and official monuments. If there be a question of proving an immemorial custom, the witnesses must be able to affirm that they themselves have been cognizant of the matter at issue for a space of at least forty years, that they have heard it referred to by their progenitors as something always observed, and that neither they nor their fathers have ever been aware of any fact to the contrary. If the fact of the existence of an alleged custom is not sufficiently proved, it is to be rejected as constituting a source of law. Customs may be revoked by a competent ecclesiastical legislator, in the same way and for the same reasons as other ordinances are abrogated. A later general law contrary to a general custom will nullify the latter, but a particular custom will not be abrogated by a general law, unless a clause to that effect be inserted. Even such a nullifying clause will not be sufficient for the abrogation of immemorial customs. The latter must be mentioned explicitly, for they are held not to be included in any general legal phrase, however sweeping its terms may be. Customs may likewise be abrogated by contrary customs, or they may lose their legal force by the mere fact that they fall into desuetude. Finally, an authentic declaration that a custom is absolutely contrary to good morals and detrimental to the interests of the hierarchy or of the faithful deprives it of its supposed legal value.

== See also ==
- Customary law
- Customary international law
