= Customary (liturgy) =

Christian book containing regulations and ceremonies

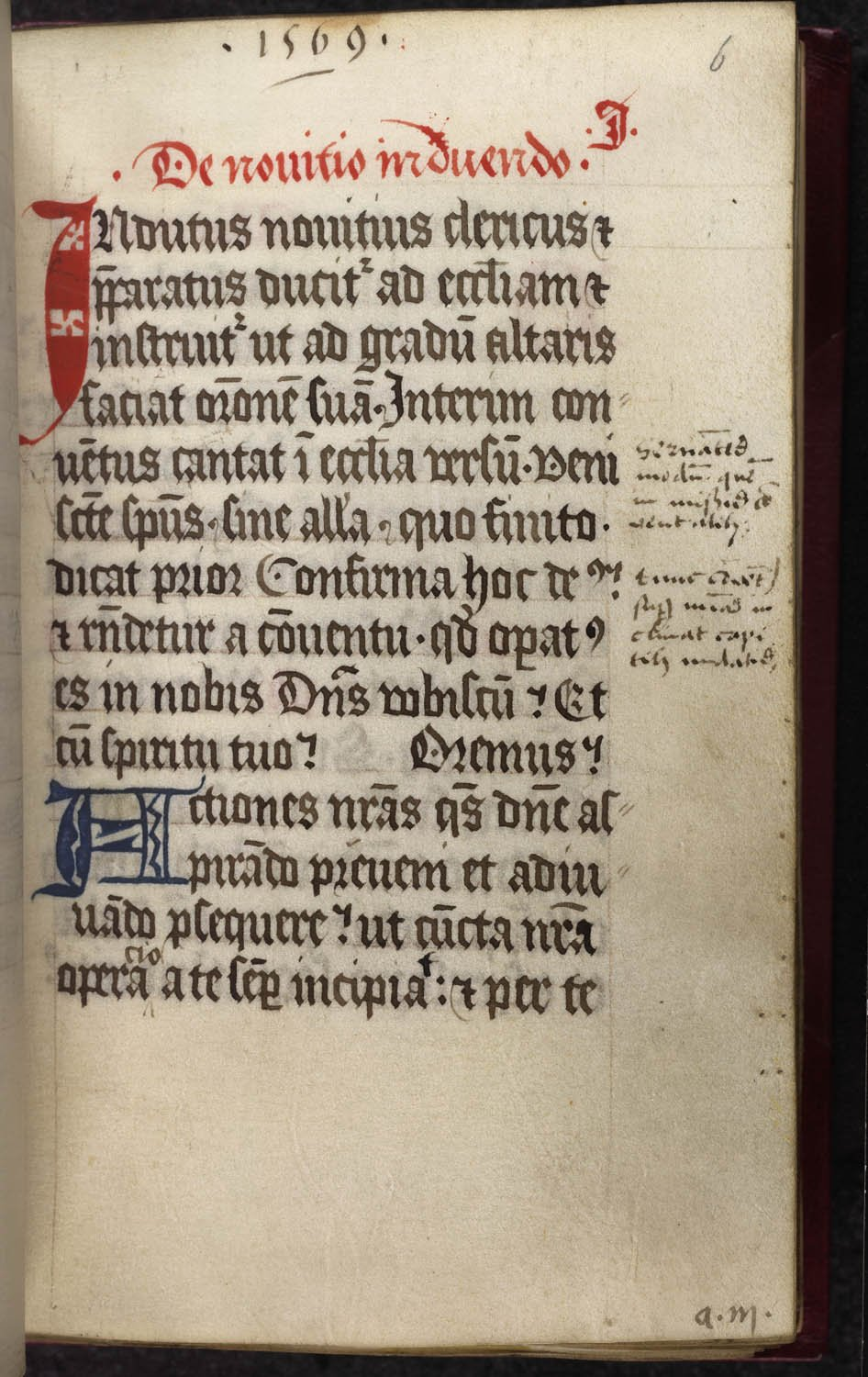
A page from an English Carthusian customary manuscript, c. 1450–1549

A customary is a Christian liturgical book containing the adaptation of a ritual family and rite for a particular context, typically to local ecclesiastical customs and specific church buildings. A customary is generally synonymous to and sometimes constituent of a consuetudinary (Latin: consuetudinarius or consuetudinarium) that contains the totality of the consuetudines—ceremonial forms and regulations—used in the services and community practices of a particular monastery, religious order, or cathedrals. The distinctive qualities of medieval liturgical uses are often described within customaries. In modern contexts, a customary may also be referred to as a custom book.

== Description ==
Customaries are generally liturgical books containing the liturgical and regulatory customs of a particular place or group. Typically subordinate to and in accordance with a given ritual family's primary texts for celebrating a given ritual–such as editions of the Book of Common Prayer within Anglicanism–they adapt these texts according to the spatial constraints of particular church buildings, cathedrals, or religious communities. Customaries were often anonymously written and general in coverage. While some liturgical historians, such as Walter Frere, would distinguish the consuetudinary from the customary, later scholarship has described these texts as concurrent in content but successive in time; others have identified both as proximate and even synonymous with the medieval ordinal. Compared to texts like the Ceremoniale Romanum and the Ceremoniale Episcoporum that were meant to standardize cathedral and collegiate church worship according to the Roman Rite, customaries were dependent on the buildings hosting the liturgies. The Sarum Use customary was of particular note in providing for celebrations outside the cathedral.

Customaries simultaneously developed to contain the community customs and daily organization of a religious order, and often individual customaries would contain material both liturgical and regulatory. While individual monasteries were generally autonomous or semiautonomous during the European Medieval period, individual customaries would trend towards conformity with of the largest contemporaneous monastic communities, such as that at Monte Cassino. They were part of a variety of interrelated other books that directed all aspects of a liturgical celebration and, in the context of religious orders, were supplemental to monastic rules.

=== Academic appraisal ===
Medieval customaries have received recent academic appreciation, particularly from historians of monasticism, who appreciate the detail available in descriptions of the ceremonies and their interactions with local infrastructure. Since the first half of the 20th century, the study of customaries has evolved into its own discipline. Among the notable publications that led to this renewed interest in customaries are Consuetudines monasticae, produced by Bruno Albers from 1905 to 1912, and Corpus Consuetudinum Monasticarum, a continuing series first published in 1963 with Kassius Hallinger as editor that is considered the best source on Benedictine customaries. In some cases, architectural historians have leveraged the detail within historic customaries to reconstruct the appearance of abbey churches at different points in the past. Monastic customaries, such as those compiled by monks observing the ceremonies of the highly influential Cluny Abbey, have been interpreted as documenting reforms and the boundaries of a given abbey's influence. Despite continued research, the territorial relationships between customaries–especially among those from the Benedictines and Augustinian canons–remain poorly understood.

== History ==
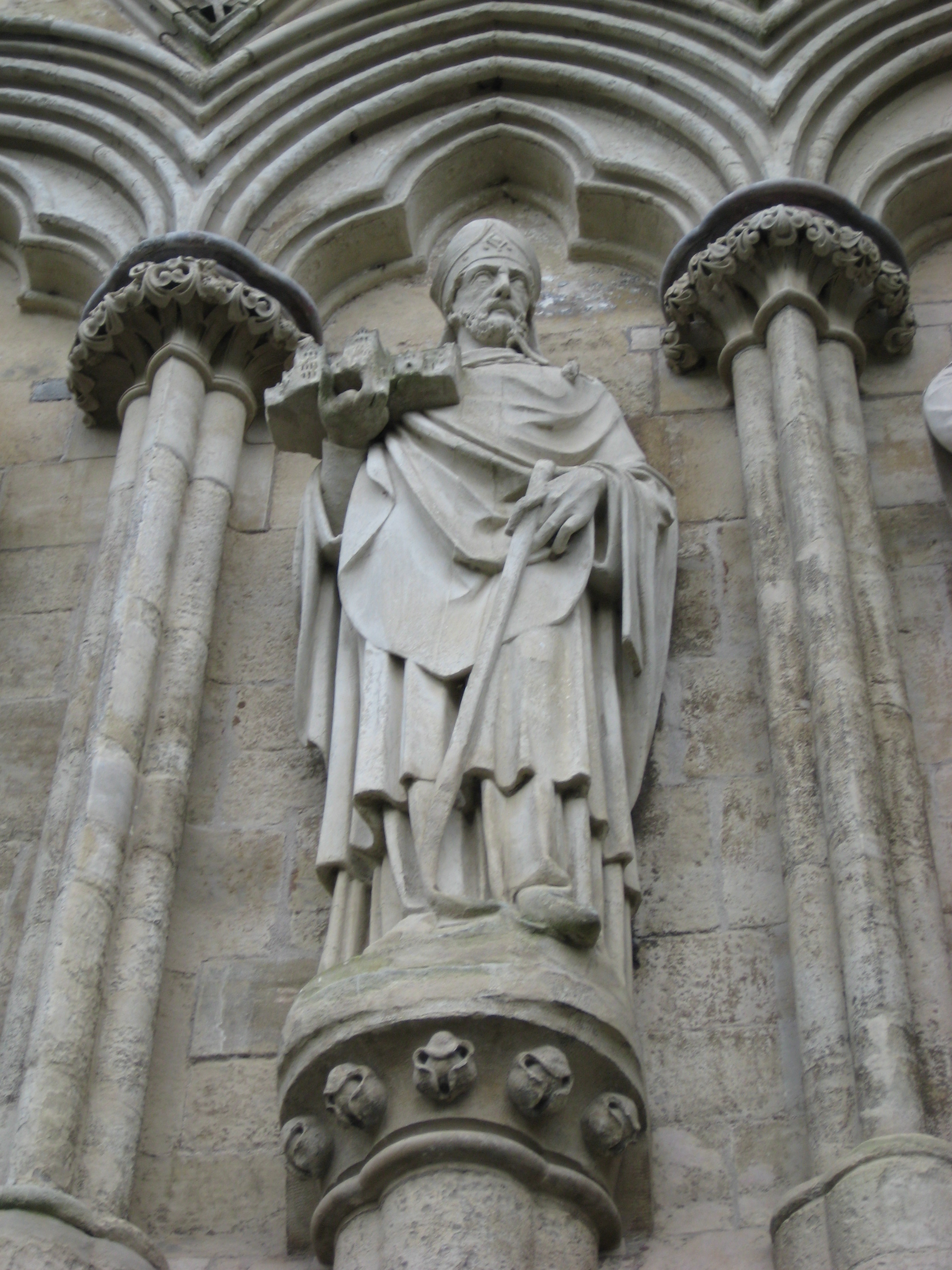
Statue of Richard Poore at Salisbury Cathedral. Poore is credited with producing an early version of the Sarum Consuetudinary.

As bishops had increasing responsibilities, they were increasingly absent from their cathedrals. This necessitated the creation of books of rules for use by the clergy left in charge of cathedrals' practices. The consuetudinary contained these regulations. It also contains the general ceremony and assigned roles for rituals in accordance with rules of precedence and local customs. In monastic communities, the consuetudinary could also introduce new rules and practices; among the earliest requirements for mental prayer was contained in a 12th-century Carthusian consuetudinary.

In cases like the Sarum Use at Salisbury Cathedral, the most important portions of the consuetudinary were condensed into what Frere distinguished as the customary. In the case of Salisbury, the consuetudinary is dated to roughly 1210–though with a range of 1173 to 1220–when Richard Poore was the cathedral's dean and formed the most comprehensive code of customs of the Sarum Use. The Sarum ordinal was a similar book for use by the choir and contained greater detail on certain liturgical actions only addressed more generally by the consuetudinary. The Sarum consuetudinary made reference to the ordinal and relied on it for complete celebration of a given ritual. Surviving manuscripts of the Sarum ordinal and customary dating from before 1279 and originating from outside cathedral feature appended notes that suggest the practices of Salisbury Cathedral had changed from Poore's time as dean.

Gradually, the texts needed for the celebration of the Mass–sacramentary, gradual, Gospel book, and epistle book–were condensed into the missal and the texts of canonical hours–psalter, antiphonal, and others–were condensed into the breviary. This abrogated the need for the ordinal, and in the Sarum Use it was partially integrated into the consuetudinary. Customaries themselves fell into disuse during the 16th century with the increasing standardization of worship in Catholic Church through its imposition of the Tridentine Mass and the 1588 establishment of the Congregation of Rites and the Church of England through its uniform adoption of the Book of Common Prayer.

Customaries were revived in response to the variety of worship patterns that developed within Anglicanism during the 19th century. Editions of the Book of Common Prayer, such as 1662 prayer book in the Church of England, offered few explicit ceremonial directions. As such, communities such as Chichester Cathedral assembled and published customaries for not only internal usage but reference by other church communities.

The use of customaries or custom books continues in Catholic monastic communities, where monasteries such as those of the Benedictine Swiss-American and American-Cassinese Congregations are required by congregational constitutions to create their own customaries. The Second Vatican Council's Decree on the Adaptation and Renewal of Religious Life (Perfectae Caritatis, 1965) directed that custom books were to be adapted to contemporary circumstances and the needs of the post-conciliar church.

== See also ==
- Christian monasticism
- Pontifical
- Rule of Saint Benedict
- Sthathicon
