= Brian Cummings (literary scholar) =

Professor of English

Brian Cummings, FBA is Anniversary Professor in the Department of English and Related Literature at the University of York. He was elected a fellow of the British Academy in 2016.

== Selected publications ==
- Mortal Thoughts: Religion, Secularity and Identity in Shakespeare and Early Modern Culture (Oxford University Press, 2013).
- The Book of Common Prayer: The Texts of 1549, 1559, and 1662 (Oxford University Press, 2011; Oxford World's Classics edition 2013): Runner-Up, Atlantic Book of the Year 2012.
- The Literary Culture of the Reformation: Grammar and Grace (Oxford University Press, 2002; paperback 2007): Times Literary Supplement Book of the Year for 2003.
