= Black Rubric =

Part of the Book of Common Prayer

The term Black Rubric is the popular name for the declaration found at the end of the "Order for the Administration of the Lord's Supper" in the Book of Common Prayer (BCP), the Church of England's liturgical book. The Black Rubric explains why communicants should kneel when receiving Holy Communion and excludes possible misunderstandings of this action. The declaration was composed in 1552, but the term dates from the 19th century when the medieval custom of printing the rubrics in red was followed in editions of the BCP while the declaration was printed in black.

== History ==
In September 1552, after Parliament had approved the Second Prayer Book of Edward VI, John Knox and others argued before the Privy Council that the Holy Communion should be received sitting, but were refuted by Archbishop Thomas Cranmer. As a result of this clash, the council acted on its own authority and ordered the inclusion of the declaration in the new prayer book. The first copies had already been printed so it had to be pasted into them as a correction slip. It explained that kneeling was an expression of "humble and grateful acknowledging of the benefits of Christ, given unto the worthy receiver" and did not imply any adoration of the bread and wine or of the real and essential presence of Christ's natural flesh and blood. Historians have asked about whose victory the Black Rubric represents. Whilst Diarmaid MacCulloch has argued that it was a victory for Cranmer, Isabel Davis, who has made a study based on multiple examples, has made the case that it was a victory for no one and that its interpolation physically disrupted Cranmer's prayer book and the project of uniformity.

The "rubric" was omitted from the Elizabethan prayer-book of 1559, probably as part of the Queen's policy to retain the support of moderate traditionalists (she believed in the Real Presence without a definition of it; and, had she got her way, the celebration of the Prayer Book Communion would have looked like a Mass), but possibly also on the technical grounds that the reversal of her Catholic predecessor's repeal of Edward VI's Protestant legislation revived the 1552 BCP as approved by Parliament and not as published. This omission was one of the cherished grievances of the Puritans and in the Savoy Conference of 1661 the Presbyterians demanded its restoration; but the twelve bishops who took part were not willing to grant it. However, the revision of the prayer-book in 1661/2 involved all the bishops, representatives of the clergy and both Houses of Parliament. At a late stage in the proceedings, the "rubric" was rewritten and condensed with its language updated and a possibly significant verbal modification, the words "real and essential" in 1552 being changed to "Corporal". In this new form, it became part of the book as finally approved. and therefore forms part of the doctrinal standards of the Church of England (Canon A5), but it has never been included in the alternative forms of worship (such as Common Worship) authorised or allowed by Canons B1, B2 and B4.

It is debatable whether the verbal change "corporal" in place of "real and essential" implied some type of recognition of the "real presence" or simply updated the terminology because the original phrase was now out of date. Frere says it does but Griffith Thomas says the opposite. The removal of the rubric by Elizabeth halted any movement towards a more radical Calvinistic position in favor of "fudging and fumbling" (playing a course between radical Protestantism and Catholicism and stressing the continuity of the Church "no break with the Popish past"), Christopher Haigh, op. cit., p. 242.

== Text ==
In the 1552 edition of the Book of Common Prayer, the Black Rubric was written as follows (italics added for emphasis):

Although no order can be so perfectly devised, but it may be of some, either for their ignorance and infirmity, or else of malice and obstinacy, misconstrued, depraved, and interpreted in a wrong part: And yet because brotherly charity willeth, that so much as conveniently may be, offences should be taken away: therefore we willing to do the same. Whereas it is ordered in the book of common prayer, in the administration of the Lord's Supper, that the Communicants kneeling should receive the holy Communion: which thing being well meant, for a signification of the humble and grateful acknowledging of the benefits of Christ, given unto the worthy receiver, and to avoid the profanation and disorder, which about the holy Communion might else ensue: lest the same kneeling might be thought or taken otherwise, we do declare that it is not meant thereby, that any adoration is done, or ought to be done, either unto the Sacramental bread or wine there bodily received, or unto any real and essential presence there being of Christ's natural flesh and blood. For as concerning the sacramental bread and wine, they remain still in their very natural substances, and therefore may not be adored, for that were Idolatry to be abhorred of all faithful Christians. And as concerning the natural body and blood of our Saviour Christ, they are in heaven and not here. For it is against the truth of Christ's true natural body, to be in more places than in one at one time.

The version in the 1662 Book of Common Prayer was slightly altered as follows (italics added for emphasis):

Whereas it is ordained in this Office for the Administration of the Lord's Supper, that the Communicants should receive the same kneeling; (which order is well meant, for a signification of our humble and grateful acknowledgment of the benefits of Christ therein given to all worthy Receivers, and for the avoiding of such profanation and disorder in the holy Communion, as might otherwise ensue;) yet, lest the same kneeling should by any persons, either out of ignorance and infirmity, or out of malice and obstinacy, be misconstrued and depraved: It is hereby declared, That thereby no adoration is intended, or ought to be done, either unto the Sacramental Bread or Wine there bodily received, or unto any Corporal Presence of Christ's natural Flesh and Blood. For the Sacramental Bread and Wine remain still in their very natural substances, and therefore may not be adored; (for that were Idolatry, to be abhorred of all faithful Christians;) and the natural Body and Blood of our Saviour Christ are in Heaven, and not here; it being against the truth of Christ's natural Body to be at one time in more places than one.

== Bibliography ==
Brian Douglas, A Companion to Anglican Eucharistic Theology, Volume 1, Leiden: Brill, 2012
