= Book of Common Prayer (1928, England) =

Proposed Anglican liturgical book

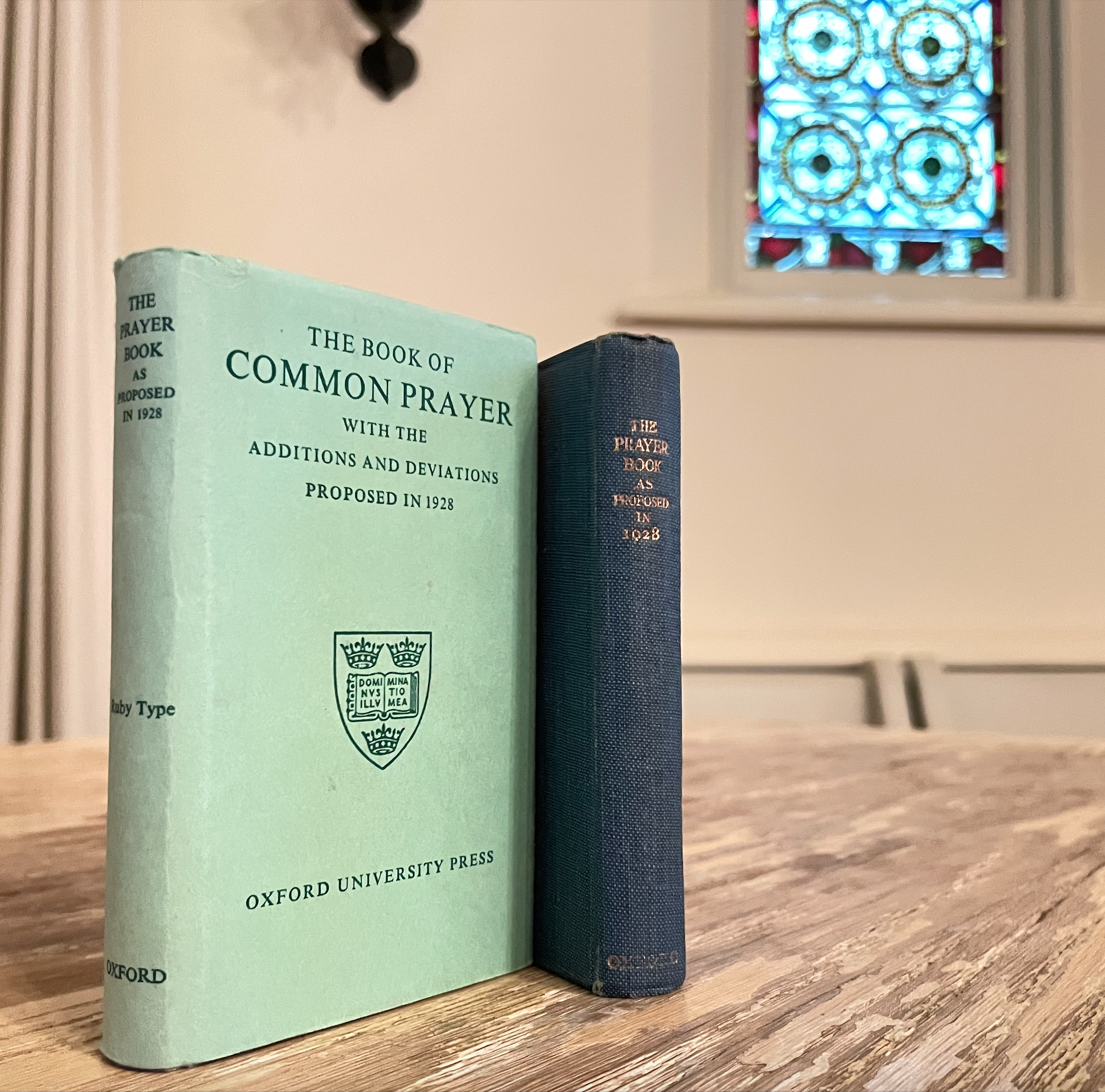
Two Oxford printings of the proposed 1928 Book of Common Prayer

The 1928 Book of Common Prayer, sometimes known as the Deposited Book, is a liturgical book which was proposed as a revised version of the Church of England's 1662 Book of Common Prayer. Opposing what they saw as an Anglo-Catholic revision that would align the Church of England with the Catholic Church—particularly through expanding the practice of the reserved sacrament—Protestant evangelicals and nonconformists in Parliament put up significant resistance, driving what became known as the Prayer Book Crisis.

A text resultant from the Anglo-Catholics and the reaction against them, the proposed revised prayer book failed twice in the House of Commons, first in December 1927 and then in June 1928. With the failures in Parliament, the Church of England's spiritual authority suffered a significant blow. Though Parliament never approved it, the proposed prayer book's use would become widespread during the mid-20th century and see internal approval by the Church of England. The proposed prayer book and its failed adoption has influenced both the contents and revision procedures for Anglican liturgical books both in England and elsewhere.

== Background ==
Early Oxford Movement Tractarians of the Church of England had interpreted the 1662 Book of Common Prayer as a catholic liturgy with rubrics that should be closely followed. This view was challenged by "second-generation" Tractarians and members of the Cambridge Movement, who found the 1662 prayer book too liturgically Protestant. Instead, this latter faction advocated the adoption of ceremonial and some liturgical practices from the Catholic Church, such as celebrating Communion facing eastward, placing candles and a cross on the altar, and vestments. These "usages" were justified by ritualists pointing to the prayer book's Ornaments Rubric, contending that it mandated such practices. It was these Anglo-Catholic and similar movements that would ultimately spur the prayer book revision movement in England.

Among some clergy, adoption of medieval Sarum and modern Catholic Latin liturgies was contemporaneous with the proliferation of Anglo-Catholic devotional literature in the 1870s and 1880s. The Tractarian John Henry Newman's conversion to the Catholic Church elicited praise but also raised concerns regarding his peers' degree of conformity to the Church of England. The Protestant-leaning evangelical party of Anglicans advocated for measures that removed "ambiguity" regarding the prayer book's Protestant qualities. The resulting Royal Commission on Ritual—formed in 1867—and its four reports resulted in the 1872 Act of Uniformity Amendment Act and 1874 Public Worship Regulation Act, the latter of which established a secular court to which bishops could send insubordinate ritualist priests. After several priests were imprisoned, public opinion grew hostile towards these courts and ultimately bishops would refrain from bringing priests before them. (Note: In 1888, Bishop of Lincoln Edward King was brought before an ecclesiastical court raised by Archbishop of Canterbury Edward White Benson at the prompting of the Church Association. King was accused of practicing six illegal ritualist usages, though Benson ultimately ruled that four of the six practices were permissible.)

Opposition to ritualist practice led in the 1890s by John Kensit and his Protestant Truth Society further challenged Anglo-Catholics, who were represented by the English Church Union and Viscount Halifax. While Archbishop of Canterbury Frederick Temple had officially approved several Anglo-Catholic practices, politician William Harcourt met with the church's archbishops in 1900 to promote the prosecution of ritualists. This meeting resulted in a statement that prohibited the reserved sacrament and use of incense in worship.

Despite this, ritualists continued researching further into the past in search of patristic continuity. The Alcuin Club, founded in 1897 to research the history and use of the prayer book, often pulled from medieval pre-Reformation period and sometimes the first centuries of Christian history. Liturgical scholars would soon lean on this research in their criticisms of the 1662 prayer book, preferring a "primitive" liturgy. Prayer book historian Brian Cummings credited their research with doing more to "unearth the original manuscripts of the liturgical traditions", though critiqued their ardent defense of the Victorian era "Anglo-Catholic myth" that the 1549 prayer book was very close to the medieval Sarum Use.

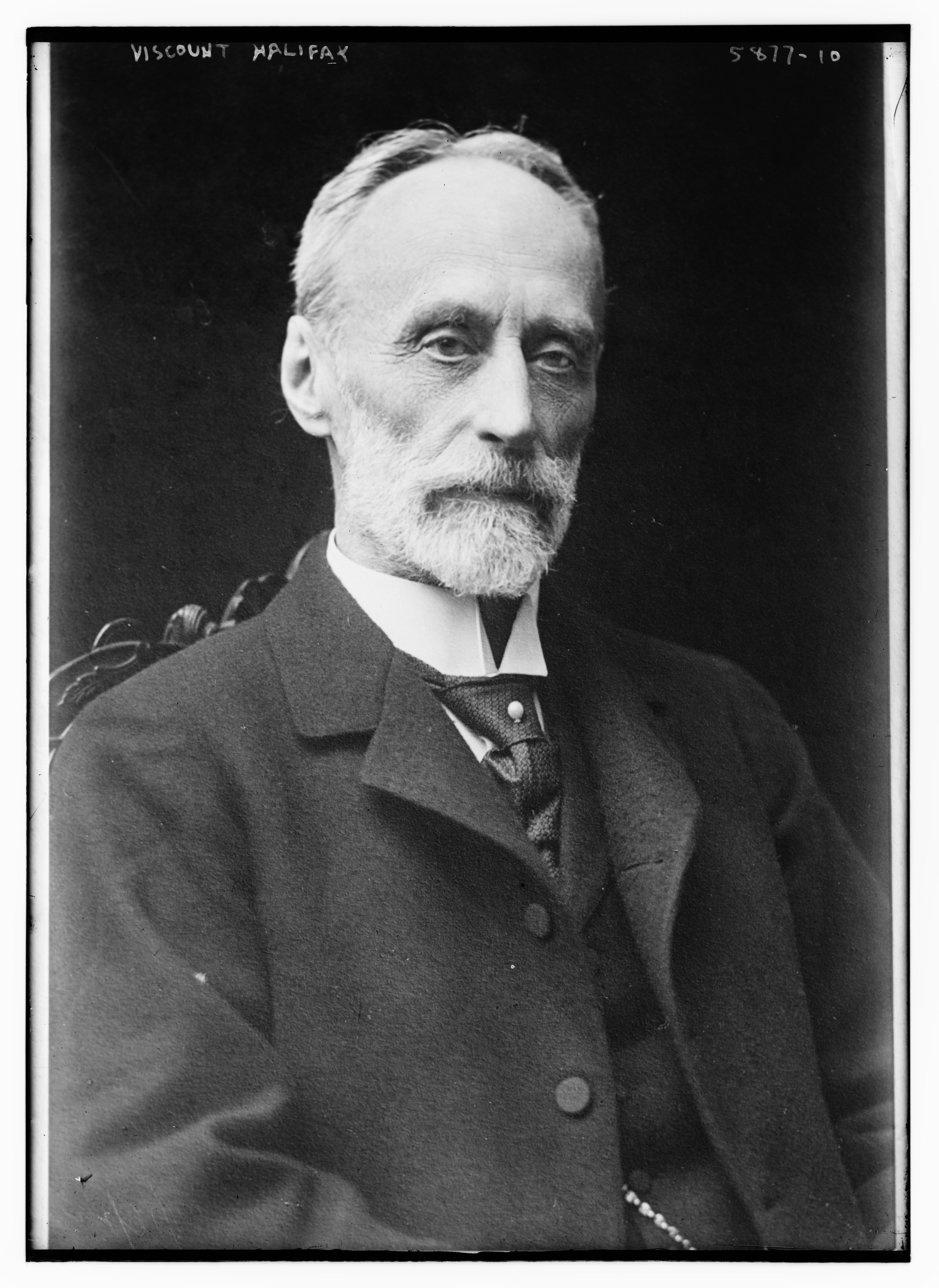
Charles Wood, 2nd Viscount Halifax, was a prominent Anglo-Catholic who led the English Church Union in support of ritualist practice.

The 19th century saw several Anglican liturgical revision efforts outside England: the United States Episcopal Church made a series of minor changes between 1808 and 1868 before approving a comprehensive but conservative prayer book revision in 1892, Church of Ireland evangelicals guided the creation of an 1877 prayer book, and Canadian Anglicans were considering their own revisions from an Anglo-Catholic direction. (Note: Walter Frere would contextualize the potential for English revision with these international examples in his The Re-Construction of Worship (1912).) In England, Anglo-Catholics scholarship and the 1662 prayer book's increasingly dated language both challenged prior idealization of the 1662 liturgies. The linguistic issues within the prayer book, many of which were derived from Thomas Cranmer's translation of Latin, left pastors many "trip-wires" with theological and ministerial implications that could not be easily explained. With no way to stop the mechanisms behind this and other complications, Church of England clergy increasingly supported revision.

Shortly after assuming the archiepiscopate at Canterbury in 1903, Randall Davidson told parliament that he would rein in the ritualists. In March the next year, Davidson and Prime Minister Arthur Balfour authorized a review of the state of church discipline to address the debate between Anglo-Catholics and their opponents. The Royal Commission on Ecclesiastical Discipline—chaired by Michael Hicks Beach—interviewed 164 witnesses to produce a four-volume report in 1906. This report asserted "the law of public worship is too narrow for the religious life of the present generation", particularly with regard to the desire for ceremony and historic continuity as violations of policies including the Ornaments Rubric were widespread. The commission also reported the means of enforcing teaching and practice in the church were ineffective. The report included ten recommendations primarily compiled by Davidson. Among the recommendations was to begin revising the vestiture rubrics, formally initiating the process for a new prayer book authorized by an Act of Uniformity.

== Revision process ==
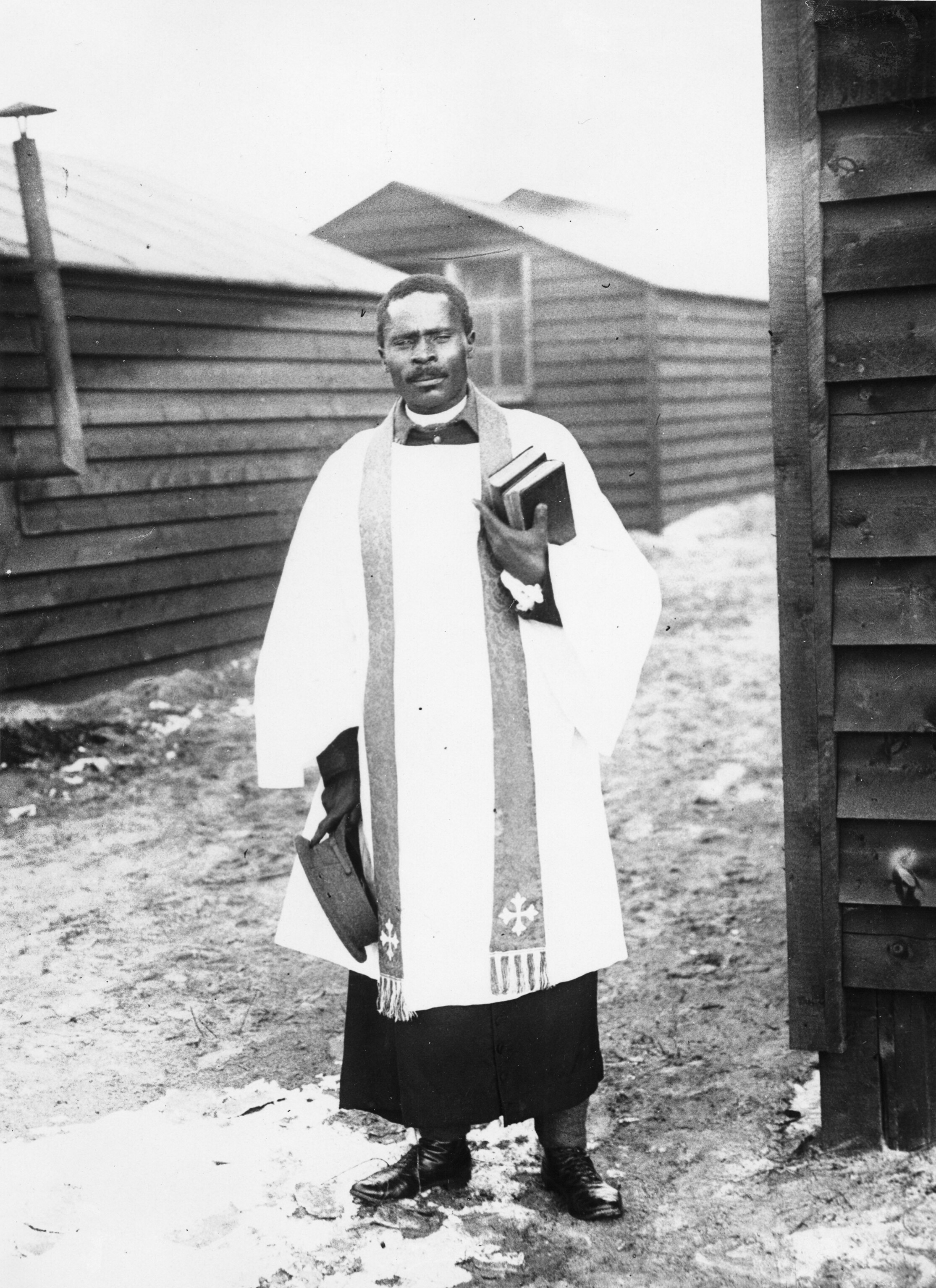
Anglican chaplains, such as this priest likely assigned to the South African Native Labour Corps, were charged with the pastoral duties of wartime. Many felt the 1662 prayer book was inadequate for these purposes.

The initial period of revision, between 1906 and 1914, primarily focused on the 1662 prayer book's Ornaments Rubric and its role in justifying Anglo-Catholic ceremonial practice. John Wordsworth chaired a group of five bishops who issued a report on the rubric in 1908 with the assistance of leading moderate Anglo-Catholic liturgist Walter Frere. The report's assertion that chasubles were legal elicited protest; the upper house of the Convocations of Canterbury and York passed a resolution that was less supportive of this view. In his 1911 Some Principles of Liturgical Reform, Frere requested for a committee to examine liturgical affairs; Davidson established such a body in May that year. Attempting to create a balanced committee, the evangelical bishop Thomas Drury was appointed alongside Arthur James Mason, Frere, Frank Edward Brightman, and, from 1912 onward, Percy Dearmer and Percival Jackson.

Many Anglican scholars in this period published extensive histories on liturgical practice, largely in association with the Alcuin Club. Among them were E. G. Cuthbert F. Atchley's History of the Use of Incense in Divine Worship (1909), F. E. Warren's The Sarum Missal in English (1913), Brightman's The English Rite (1915), and Frere's research on medieval pontificals and early sacramentaries. Another influential work came in the anonymously written A Prayer-Book Revised (1913) prefaced by Charles Gore. It was understood that these scholars were to "safeguard" the "both catholic and reformed" Anglican identity in a manner akin to the earlier Non-jurors. (Note: Through the latter portions of the revision process, many bishops embraced a Centre-High view that historian John G. Maiden identified as its own via media against "theological and liturgical fragmentation".)

In February 1914, the convocation's upper house report was published and committees established to oversee the work. Davidson revealed his disinterest in revision in private correspondence, considering it a distraction from church administration. Soon, World War I hampered the work and saw discussion of approval delayed until after the war so that the laity could engage. Gregory Dix characterized the general attitude among the revisers pre-war with a quote from Bishop George Forrest Browne, who said "that there should be a minimum of change" and "that there should be no change that in any sort of way could honestly be said to touch doctrine at all" (a view similar to Davidson's); Dix compared this with what he found to be a similar attitude in the 1662 prayer book's revision process. This moderate stance towards revision emphasized making a prayer book more easily enforced by law. During the war, Convocation continued reviewing potential changes. Among these was a proposal to emulate the 1549 English and 1637 Scottish prayer books' Holy Communion offices and to move the Prayer of Oblation to after the Consecration. Viscount Halifax went further, requesting that the 1549 Communion service be approved.

The war proved a proximate cause in the more significant revision which followed. Reservation of the sacrament became more popular during the war, as the convenience convinced chaplains who may have avoided this "Romish" practice in peacetime. From 1911, a convocational drafted rubric that had been intended to prevent "extra-liturgical devotions" by authorizing reservation exclusively for communing the sick served as the standard for diocesan permissions. (Note: Standard procedure was locking chapels in which the sacrament was reserved to prevent eucharistic adoration. This policy had failed by the end of the war, with the number of parishes reserving the sacrament eventually rising from around a hundred in 1906 to an estimated 670 by 1928. Bishop of London Arthur Winnington-Ingram advised bishops in 1917 that locking chapels was ineffective, saying they "might as well have stood in Palestine in the path of 50,000 people who thought the Lord was in a certain house, as resist what is at least the same number of people who wish to lay their burdens at his feet today.") Though generally popular, the increased permissions for reservation during the war were met with strong evangelical disapproval and suspicion. Linguistically, the 16th-century diction were not comforting to the many illiterate and barely literate soldiers most in ministerial need. The 1662 prayer book's monotony similarly came under scrutiny during the war, with its repetitiveness felt "mindless" by those attending its liturgies. Alec Vidler described the "conventional worship of the Church of England" as "too dull and cold and reserved" for those living on the social margins. It was among the slums that Tractarians and ritualists had entrenched their ministries, with great success. These factors meant that the moderate rubrical adjustments advocated in the 1906 report were felt insufficient by the war's end.

=== Postwar ===
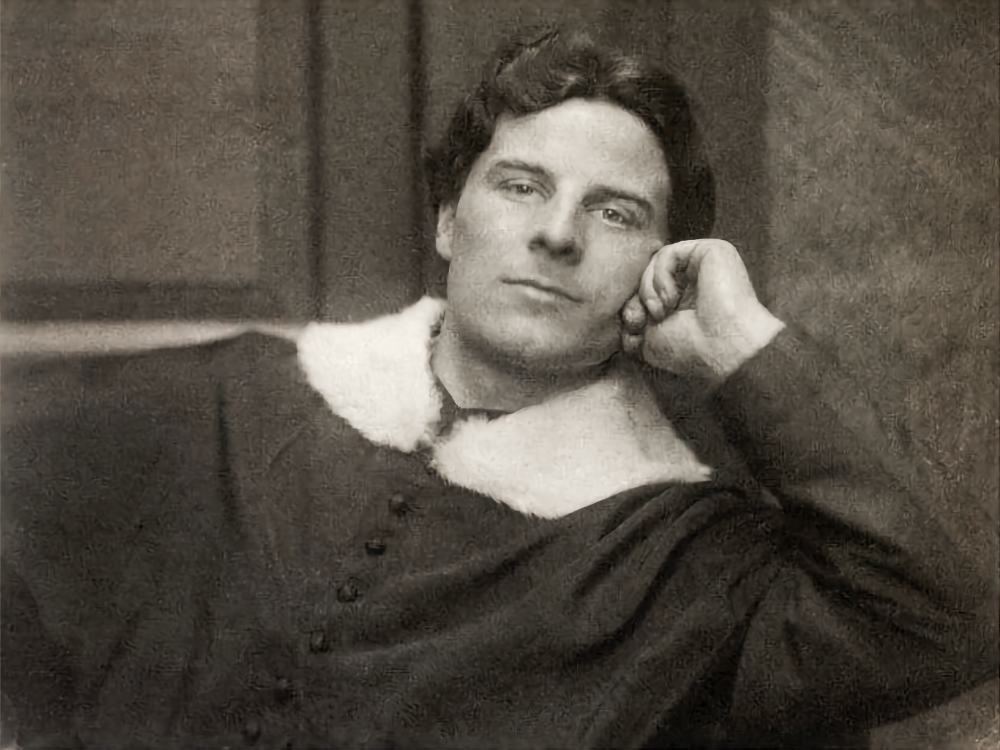
Percy Dearmer (pictured c. 1890) was among the liberal Anglo-Catholics who produced the Grey Book proposal.

While chaplains returning from the war and those ministering to the working class had identified the needs for "a simplified, linguistically modernized, and theologically less intimidating" liturgy in their mounting support for a significantly revised prayer book, these pastoral concerns were generally dismissed once the more substantial work began. Instead, scholastic and party lines became the dominant forces in this renewed process. The role of revision fell not to chaplains, but rather academics more focused on relitigating the evangelical-versus-traditionalist debate that had run since Cranmer's era. Further, the perceived "timeless sanctity" of both the 1662 prayer book and the King James Version of the Bible saw many defend the dated language of both texts as essential for worship. General modernization of the liturgical language would not be accomplished until the 1960s.

By 1918, according to Dix, the concern with statutory matters had given way to revision from the "point of view of liturgy not law." The lower house of Canterbury voted that year in support of altering the Communion service and in 1920 a special conference favoured adopting an "Eastern" modification to the service. The revision process became complicated by Parliament passing the Enabling Act in December 1919, establishing the National Assembly of the Church of England with an upper house of clergy and a lower house of laity was established. The National Assembly first met in 1920, setting up a committee on prayer book revision in the autumn. That committee's report was published in June 1922 as NA 60. The House of Bishops passed the Revised Prayer Book (Permissive Use) Measure that accepted these recommendations—including reservation of the sacrament—without modification in October that year, publishing the liturgy with suggested changes as NA 84. The proposed lectionary changes were detached and submitted to parliament, which passed it in 1922 and accepted its use alongside the 1871 revised lectionary.

NA 84's publication saw three major external efforts to influence the final proposed prayer book. The resulting three proposals were known by the colour of their covers: the English Church Union's "Green Book", the Life and Liberty Movement's "Grey Book", and the Alcuin Club's "Orange Book". (Note: The Green Book's full title was A Suggest Prayer Book: Being the text of the English Rite altered and enlarged in accordance with the Prayer Book Revision proposals made by the English Church Union. The Grey Book's full title was A New Prayer Book: Proposals for the Revision of the Book of Common Prayer and for Additional Services and Prayers, drawn up by a Group of Clergy. The Orange Book's full title was A Survey of the Proposals for the Alternative Prayer Book and was published as three pamphlets.)

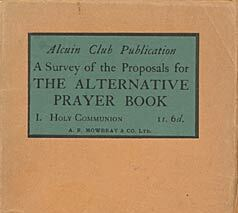
As with the other external proposals, Walter Frere and the Alcuin Club's 1923-4 "Orange Book" was known by its cover's colour.

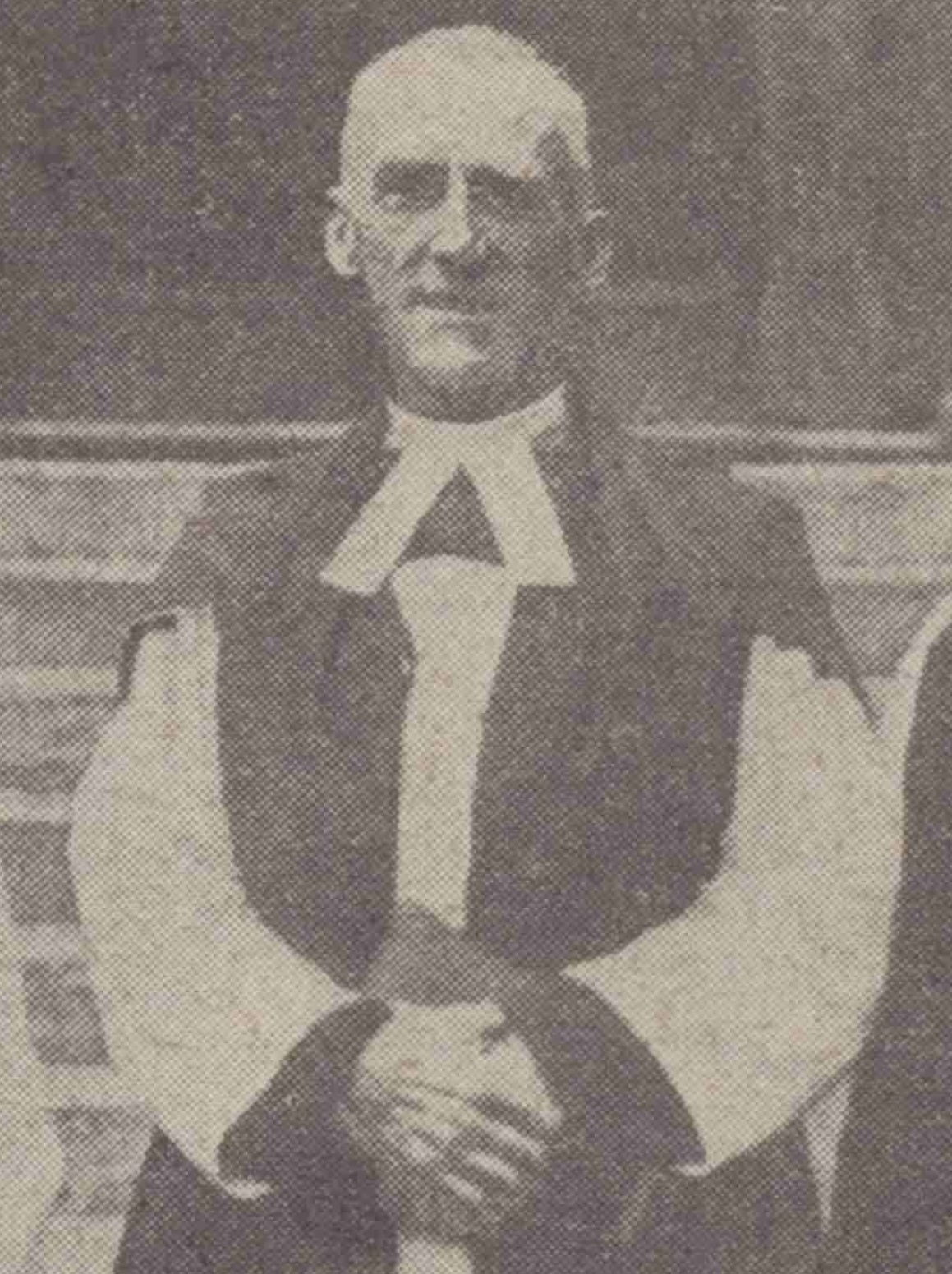
Frere pictured at his 1923 consecration (Note: Frere's use of the proposed prayer book in 1928 led to 200 parishioners marching in protest before his episcopal palace. As the Bishop of Truro, Frere authorized the revised prayer book for use in his diocese in 1929, drawing further protest. He went on to engage in a High versus Low church "quarrel" with the anti-revision Bishop of Birmingham, Ernest Barnes.)

The Green Book, published in October 1922, took a scholarly and Anglo-Catholic view particularly visible in its support for commemorations of Saint Joseph and the Falling Asleep of the Blessed Virgin Mary. The Life and Liberty Movement, which had pushed for the National Assembly's creation, took a Liberal Anglo-Catholic stance in their 1923 Grey Book. The Grey Book, prefaced by Bishop of Manchester William Temple and "largely the work of Revd Percy Dearmer, F.R. Barry, and R.G. Parsons", reflected what prayer book historian Geoffrey Cuming called "a remarkable combination of sound liturgical craftsmanship, modernist theology, and high-flown liberal sentiment." The Orange Book (sometimes also known as the "Yellow Book") mostly produced by Frere and published by the Alcuin Club in 1923 and 1924, took a more moderate Anglo-Catholic stance, attempting to "harmonize" the two other external proposals with NA 84. Each proposal included permission for the reserved sacrament.

Evangelical opposition to the revision process persisted through this period. Instead of organizing their own proposed revisions, many preferred to simply retain the 1662 prayer book, reckoning that suggesting improvements would weaken their stance. Especially controversial were the repositioned Prayer of Oblation, insertion of an Epiclesis, and permission to reserve the sacrament. Bishops Ernest Barnes, Lord William Cecil, Ernest Pearce, and Bertram Pollock opposed each proposal.

The National Assembly's House of Clergy and House of Laity completed their revisions in March and July 1925 respectively. The House of Clergy dropped the earlier proposed Communion canon and offered two of their own. The House of Clergy also widened the permitted forms of reservation and sought to remove the role of regulating the practice from individual bishops. The House of Laity decided on the 1662 Communion service with one alternative form, with reservation exclusively permitted for communing the sick. In October 1925, the bishops began what would eventually be 47 full days of revision. Archbishop Davidson received 800 memorials regarding the revision, including one from nine diocesan bishops that opposed any revision to the Communion service's celebration after the Nicene Creed and rejected the creation of an alternative form. A proposal to separate Communion office revisions from the other changes was defeated. (Note: Historian G. J. Cuming noted that at this later stage only one bishop consecrated since 1917, Frere, could claim liturgical expertise and that the bishops Edgar Gibson and Frederic Chase, prominent in the earlier efforts, had both died.)

The bishops' revision, which featured some original additions as well as borrowings from the unofficial proposals, was sent to convocation in February 1927. Here, some changes were again made and the rubrics on reservation were separated by the upper house. In July 1927, this version was approved by the National Assembly by a vote of 517 to 133. Soon, the matter garnered popular attention with the most partisan Anglo-Catholics and evangelicals opposing the proposed text for polar reasons: the former on the basis that it was too Protestant and the latter on the ground it contained new and old forms of "popery".

== Prayer Book Crisis ==
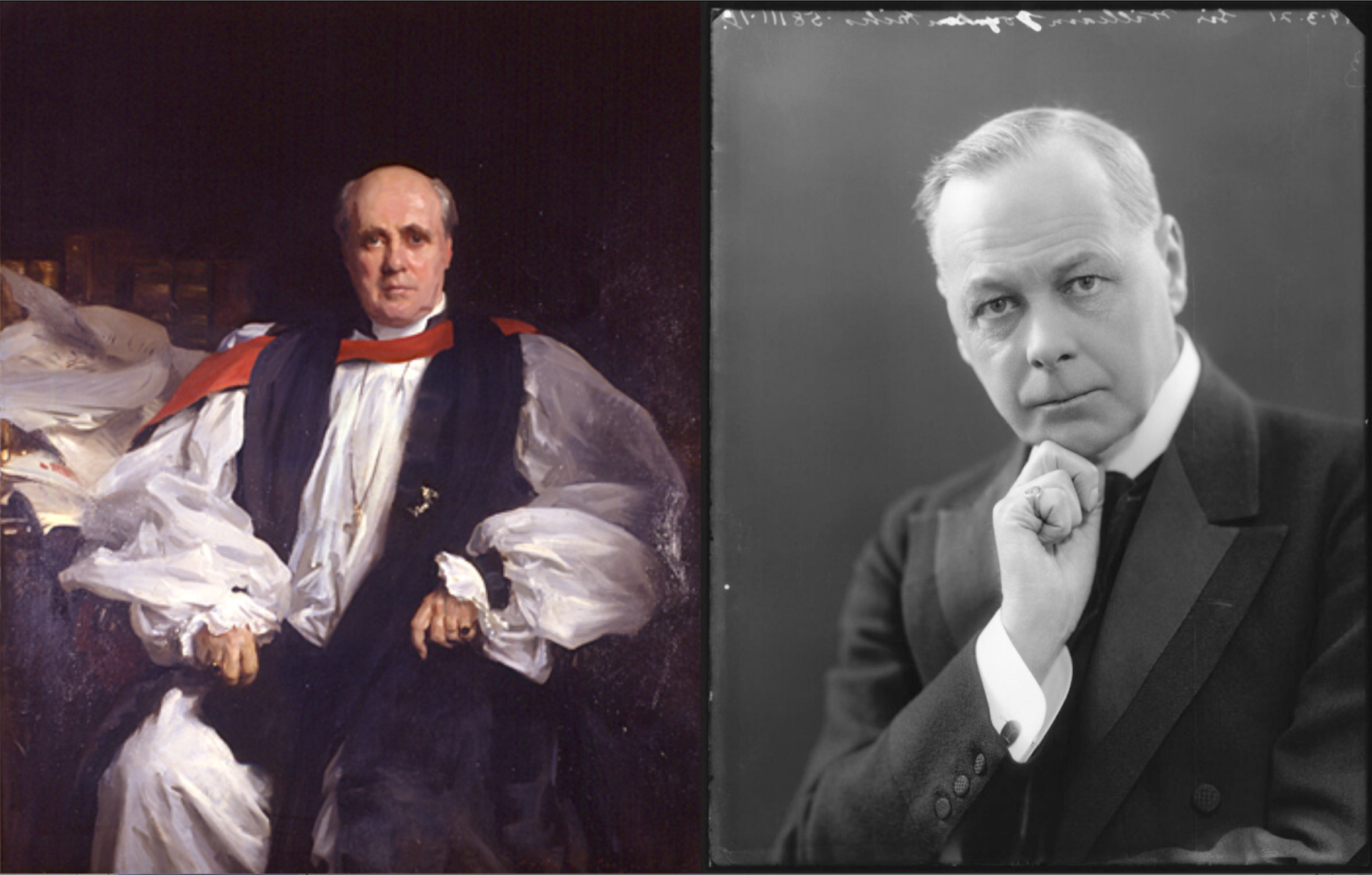
Archbishop of Canterbury Randall Davidson (left) and Home Secretary William Joynson-Hicks (right) opposed one another during the 1927–1928 Prayer Book Crisis.

In 1927, the change in liturgy became a question of national identity. Anglicans understood the Church of England as "inextricably bound up" with "English character", particularly among the many bishops who took a "Centre-High" view. Davidson considered the matter of revision in Arnoldian national terms, saying

"We want to use for the better of English life every ounce of strength which by God's benediction is ours. We want that strength so consecrated and so united that it shall be irresistible for what we desire to effect our country's life."

Anglo-Catholics framed their practices as in line with English norms, arguing that the popular masonic rituals were more complicated than Catholic ones and comparing vestments to Forester regalia. However, others concerned themselves with maintaining England's Protestant character against encroachments by the Catholic Church. In 1927, Dearmer suggested Anglo-Catholic opposition to the revised prayer book was a "determined attempted to destroy the Church of England" coordinated by the papacy. Evangelicals understood Protestantism as underpinning the relationship between the monarchy, Parliament, and the established church, pointing to the anti-papist language in the coronation oath as a contract to preserve English and British religious identity. The evangelical bishop E. A. Knox feared in 1926 that the Catholic Mass might become the coronation rite of a "Roman Catholic king"; similarly disposed churchmen would lean on rhetoric from the Reformation in their opposition to the proposed text. (Note: From 1921, evangelicals were aware and wary of Viscount Halifax's ecumenical dialogue with Rome in the Malines Conversations, fueling further concern of conspiracy.)

The Church of England's status as the established church would soon stymie the revised prayer book's adoption. Unlike the Church of Scotland—also an established church subject to Parliamentary authority—the Church of England lacked latitude in self-governance. Further frustrations arose as Anglican dominance of Parliament became increasingly diminished, particularly in the House of Commons. Since the end of the 19th century, Catholics, agnostics and atheists, non-Christians, and nonconformist Protestants made up a growing proportion of those admitted as ministers in the House of Commons and peers in the House of Lords.

To gain final approval, the proposed text was next deposited before Parliament's Ecclesiastical Committee—a procedure which lent the revision one of its popular names, the Deposited Book—and considered by this group through the late summer and autumn of 1927. The committee's 24 November report found "no change of constitutional importance is involved" and declared the revision as keeping with the coronation oath's promise "to maintain the Protestant Reformed Religion established by law". Davidson opened debate on the Prayer Book Measure in the House of Lords on 12 December, hoping it would pass there before going before the king for his royal approval. The three-day debate in the House of Lords saw emphasis on the theological implications of the revision, with several evangelical speeches against the measure. Viscount Halifax also opposed the measure, but from an Anglo-Catholic perspective. His speech on the measure, which questioned whether the Deposited Book could effectively regulate reservation, may have been an attempt to elicit further evangelical opposition to the measure. The House of Lords voted for the measure, 241 approving and 88 against.

It was anticipated that the House of Commons would pass the measure more easily; but instead, evangelical opponents had been planning their resistance before the measure had reached parliament. At a 30 November inter-party meeting led by Home Secretary William Joynson-Hicks and attended by around 100 members, four whips and an executive committee of six including the home secretary was created. Joynson-Hicks, popularly known as "Jix", had previously voiced his dissent towards the revision following its passage by the National Assembly in July and his 15 December speech proved influential on the other members. Here, Jix lambasted the alternative Communion service as "mediaeval" and declared that reservation necessarily led to adoration of the sacrament. Rosslyn Mitchell of the United Free Church of Scotland gave a similarly stirring and crucial speech, drawing upon the English Reformation and accusing the Deposited Book of promoting the doctrine of transubstantiation. Prime Minister Stanley Baldwin and some nonconformists spoke in favour, but their appeals failed. After the seven-hour debate, the outcome of the House of Commons' vote was announced at just before midnight, to much jubilation among the members. The outcome—238 votes against the measure to 205—left Archbishop Davidson "inconsolable" at the damage done to his church's spiritual authority. Vidler would later comment that "in a single hectic night the House of Commons had apparently destroyed the work of more than twenty years."

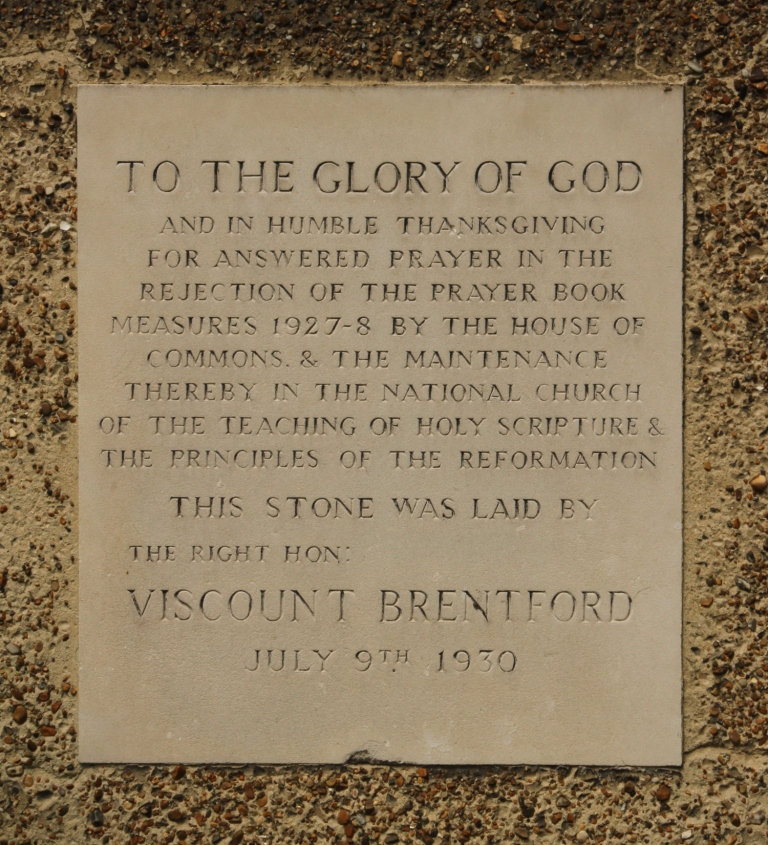
A plaque giving thanks for the defeat of the Prayer Book Measures, placed by then-Viscount Joynson-Hicks

Though he was generally indifferent to the changes and had long considered the revision process a poor use of the church's time, Davidson and others became certain that a new prayer book measure could pass by making some Protestant-leaning changes and better educating the members. Some of the Anglo-Catholic changes, such as not mandating the Prayers for the Sovereign, were undone. This second measure saw a marked decrease in support and a minor increase in opposition during its April 1928 National Assembly votes. After a spate of new pro- and anti-revision literature, the latter including The Prayer Book Crisis by Joynson-Hicks, the new measure failed on 14 June in the House of Commons with a larger majority of 266 to 220. Joynson-Hicks commented in the two-day June debate that the "question of Reservation was the crux of the whole matter" for both measures.

=== Outside England ===
Though a distinct province from the Church of England and disestablished, the prayer book debate reached the Anglican Church in Wales in 1927. After a brief and abortive attempt there in 1922, further proposals towards a local revision had not been forthcoming. However, at the Easter 1927 meeting of the Welsh bishops and with mounting speculation regarding the impact of the English proposed text upon his province, Archbishop of Wales A. G. Edwards asserted that decisions made by the English "have no authority nor force in the Province of Wales" and declared illegal the use of any prayer book other than that authorized by the Church in Wales. In September that year, a motion was brought before the Welsh Governing Body requesting consideration of the English Deposited Book; the archbishop replied that action would not be taken until "the proper moment has arrived." The motion towards consideration was carried by a great majority but intentional inaction by the Bench of Bishops meant the issue of Welsh prayer book revision would not be revisited until 1943.

The controversy also became a topic of discussion among the Scottish denominations. In both the Church of Scotland and United Free Church of Scotland, members variously approved of and opposed the revised prayer book. Reservation, vehemently rejected by English evangelicals, was an accepted and regulated practice within the Church of Scotland despite the church's doctrinal distance from Catholicism. The Episcopal Church of Scotland's Primus, Walter Robberds, refused Davidson's request for a letter calling upon Scottish parliamentarians to vote for the revision on the grounds such a statement could cause trouble. The English prayer book controversy may have also excited anti-Catholic sentiments in Scotland, with the Orange Order of Scotland publicly against the revision and many letters on the matter sent to Scottish members of parliament.

== Aftermath and influence ==
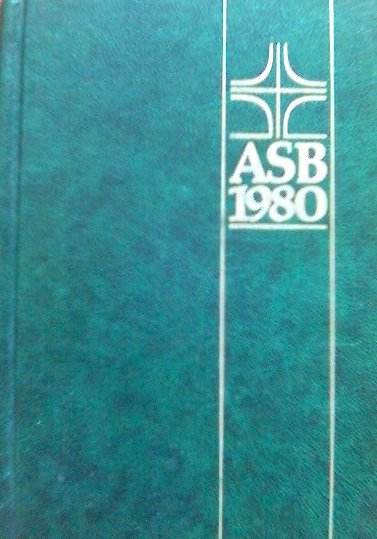
The Church of England adopted the Alternative Service Book in 1974, which was so-named to avoid the parliamentary involvement required for a new Book of Common Prayer.

The process and fallout from the failed prayer book measures saw new calls for disestablishment both within and outside of Church of England. After the December 1927 votes, there was consideration that the National Assembly should raise the matter of disestablishment; the bishops' optimism that the second measure would succeed won out then. However, the second measure's failure saw a newly minted disestablishmentarian: a former proponent of establishment, the Bishop of Hereford Hensley Henson. While Henson became a long-term advocate for disestablishment, his efforts failed to gain further traction. As the Prayer Book Crisis had not been one specifically church and state, there was reduced incentive to further separate the two. Winston Churchill had expressed an antidisestablishmentarian view in the House of Commons and the supposedly disestablishment-disposed Labour Party lacked interest in the matter. Revision opponent Bishop Pollock opposed disestablishment as "utter folly" immediately following the measures' failures, leaving Henson the only evangelical to take the disestablishment line.

Following the parliamentary rejection, use of liturgies unauthorized by parliament became widespread. In 1929, the bishops permitted the Deposited Book's use by clergy "during the present emergency." The Shorter Prayer Book, containing the most popular elements from the 1928 proposal and approved by the Archbishops of Canterbury and York in 1947, came into popular use. Ultimately, the bishops came to consider the Deposited Book's prayers and practices as lawful and formally approved its use in 1958. By 1959, many English clergymen used considerable elements of the 1928 prayer book. The belated episcopal approval for printing of and worshipping according to the 1928 prayer book was contingent on the "goodwill" of the congregations through their representation in the parochial church councils. By failing to perform this approval earlier, the Church of England may have lost out on their proposals being more broadly respected and supported and failed to establish a basis upon which further revision could be accomplished.

Among the more widely adopted 1928 forms were the reserved sacrament, the revised forms of baptism, marriage, and burial, Compline, and the supplementary collects. In particular, clergy preferred performing the marriage office without the 1662 prayer book's referencing of "men's carnal lusts and appetites, like brute beasts that have no understanding", though Cummings reported that some couples enjoyed retaining the older form and the discomfort it brought their relatives. The baptismal office was also once in use by Anglican Church of Canada clergy as an alternative to the 1918 Canadian prayer book's form.

The proposed text also proved influential on other Anglican liturgies, though other 20th century Anglican liturgies also resembled the 1928 English prayer book due to sharing many of the same influences rather than as a result of direct influence by the Deposited Book. William Perry attributed much of the Scottish Episcopalian 1929 Scottish Prayer Book to the Deposited Book, particularly the occasional offices. In the Church of Nigeria, a Hausa-language prayer book combining elements from the 1662 and proposed 1928 prayer books was used. The Nigerian church's 1996 prayer book adapted the 1928 revision's Administration to the Sick. The U.S. Episcopal Church's Standing Liturgical Commission, in its 1953 Prayer Book Studies IV, lamented that the American church had adopted its own 1928 Book of Common Prayer before having the opportunity to examine the English 1928 revision and the 1929 Scottish Prayer Book.

The 1958 Lambeth Conference and the Liturgical Movement applied renewed pressure for new liturgical developments within Anglicanism. In 1960, the notion of "permissive alternatives" was debated before Convocation. The "permissive alternatives" approach grew more popular, though concerns of starting a debate like those over the Deposited Book remained. Many services from the 1928 book were compiled in the Church of England's 1966 First Series of Alternative Services. The Series One marriage office remains authorized. Following the 1970 formation of the General Synod, the church acquired the authority to reform its liturgy. In 1974, the church adopted the Worship and Doctrine Measure which led to the 1980 Alternative Service Book, so entitled to not bring parliament's involvement as required for a prayer book. As such, the 1662 prayer book—only slightly altered from its original form—remains the sole Book of Common Prayer approved by the Church of England. The Alternative Service Book was initially adopted for a period of ten years which was renewed for a further ten before replacement by the currently authorized Common Worship.

== Contents ==
According to Cuming, the preface to the proposed prayer book was likely written by Davidson. As with the 1662 prayer book, the Psalter is the translation found within the 1540 Great Bible rather than the 1611 King James Bible.

The matter of reservation of the sacrament and its permission by rubrics within the Deposited Book proved controversial. The 1927 revision provided three rubrics that governed reservation. These rubrics only permitted reservation for the sake of communing sick persons unable to otherwise receive it—and were phrased explicitly as to prevent other uses—and established that reservation was to only occur with episcopal approval. The practice of non-liturgical adoration utilizing the reserved sacrament was illegal under the rubrics of the Deposited Book. The new vestment rubric, derived from NA 84, also attracted controversy. Bishop Arthur Headlam noted in his 1927 The New Prayer Book that the new rubric was introduced for the purpose of "peace" and "order", as prohibiting Eucharistic vestments was "impossible". The authorized vestments included the chasuble (which Headlam noted was contemporaneously used within the Church of Sweden), cope, and surplice.

=== Calendar and lectionary ===
A Table of Proper Psalms was introduced in the proposed text, assigning specific psalms to all Sundays and some holy days. While this increased the relevancy of the psalms to the given day, it broke up Cranmer's original monthly cycle in which every psalm was read during daily recitation of Morning and Evening Prayer. Many new commemorations were added to calendar of saints, though a few were omitted. Despite his medieval popularity, Thomas Becket was excluded as he was from the 1549 prayer book. The number of vigils requiring fasting was reduced to five: Christmas, Pentecost, St. John the Baptist's Day, All Saints' Day, and Saint Andrew's Day.

While the House of Clergy had approved the commemoration of Corpus Christi Day, the House of Laity had rejected the proposal. The feast's doctrinal implications regarding the Eucharist gave reason to reject a fixed date, but evangelical support permitted the insertion of an unfixed thanksgiving for each of the two Anglican sacraments: the Institution of Holy Baptism and the Institution of the Holy Communion.

=== Daily Office ===
Seeking to increase the variety within the Morning and Evening Prayer's introduction, eight penitential sentences were kept and 19 new sentences with seasonal themes were added in keeping with the earlier Scottish model. The Tudor diction and verbosity of the Confession, Exhortation, and Absolution spurred the creation of alternative forms. The third option was the Irish prayer book's sentence "Let us confess our sins to Almighty God". The proposed prayer book also included a rubric permitting the omission of the introduction "when another Service provided in this Book follows immediately".

In Benedictine and medieval secular practice, the Venite was sung with a variable antiphon to distinguish it from the psalms of a given day. The proposed prayer book reintroduced this practice for greater feasts, but this practice was not widely adopted. Frere provided the ten invitatory antiphons for the Venite, which was said through verse 7. The 1662 prayer book's daily offices ended with "The Grace" from 2 Corinthians 13; the revised text allowed for three alternative endings after the Prayers and Thanksgivings.

A new translation of the Athanasian Creed (Quicunque vult) was introduced as an option in the revised prayer book. Its recitation was prescribed for fifteen days, compared to 13 days in the 1662 offices. However, its recitation also became optional on all these days—with specific rubrical encouragement for recitation on Trinity Sunday and the Feast of the Annunciation—with added permissions allowing it to be split into two sections that omitted of the "damnatory clauses" in verses 2 and 42. This allowance recitation of the Athanasian Creed relegated to only Trinity Sunday in most parishes, with many omitting it altogether.

=== Holy Communion ===
The revised prayer book contained two Communion offices: the 1662 prayer book's Communion service was left intact and a second revised form was added. Frere's influence brought some borrowing from the 1549 and 1637 prayer books to the new rite, including an Epiclesis calling the Holy Spirit into the sacramental elements. The Gloria in Excelsis, as in the 1549 prayer book, was to be optionally omitted on weekdays. (Note: Headlam noted in his 1927 that the Agnus Dei was not explicitly described in any new rubrics and had been a legal hymn with the 1662 prayer book per the Lincoln ruling; it remained acceptable under the rubrics of the Deposited Book.)

Despite there only being one formal fixed Postcommunion thanksgiving, changes between the 1550 ordinal and the 1552 prayer book resulted in a longstanding tradition wherein the Commendatory Prayers were treated as "Postcommunions"; this tradition was formally authorized in the proposed prayer book and 1929 Scottish Prayer Book while a rubric in the 1928 American prayer book failed to completely prevent the practice.

=== Ordinal ===
The 1928 ordinal is largely that as proposed in A Prayer-Book Revised. The Grey Book and Green Book had not included ordinals, and historian Paul F. Bradshaw described Frere's Orange Book ordinal as having "merely reproduced the proposals of A Prayer-Book Revised" with the added suggestions that the litany be abbreviated for ordinations and that new form of "Come, Holy Ghost" aligned more with the Veni Creator than that written by John Cosin and found in the 1662 prayer book. Made Bishop of Truro in 1923, Frere likely guided his fellow bishops in adopting these suggested changes. Deviating from A Prayer-Book Revised, the proposed prayer book made the litany optional; if the litany was omitted in the episcopal consecration rite, silent prayer and then the litany's concluding collect were to be said to provide a prayer of the people. Additionally, the rubrics for episcopal consecration now mandated they occur on only holy days or Sundays and a new collect was added for the simultaneous ordination of deacons and priests. Brightman described the litany's omission as "very distaste" while conceding that abridgment was perhaps desirable.

In 1924, the upper houses of the Convocations of Canterbury and York adopted a rite for the making of deaconesses. This rite was included as an appendix to the bishops' proposed prayer book rather than in its ordinal. This rite was dropped in February 1927 while it was before convocation, for it had not been approved by the National Assembly. The upper house of the Canterbury convocation passed a resolution in 1937, stating that a rite for making deaconesses would be added to the ordinal of any new prayer book.

== See also ==
- Bishops' Wars – Conflict partially spurred by a prayer book revision
- Book of Common Prayer (Unitarian) – Several prior private revisions of the 1662 prayer book
- Jenny Geddes – 17th-century opponent to prayer book rites
- Prayer Book Rebellion – Conflict started by the 1549 prayer book's introduction
