= A History of the Book of Common Prayer =

Textbook by Francis Procter, revised by Walter Frere

A History of the Book of Common Prayer, with a Rationale of its Offices is an 1855 textbook by Francis Procter on the Book of Common Prayer, a series of liturgical books used by the Church of England and other Anglicans in worship. In 1901, Walter Frere published an updated version, entitled A New History of the Book of Common Prayer. Known commonly as Procter and Frere, the book remained a major text in the liturgiological study of the Book of Common Prayer through much of the 20th century. Later works, such as Geoffrey Cuming's 1969 A History of Anglican Liturgy, were written to supersede Procter and Frere as comprehensive studies following the release of further Anglican liturgical texts.

== Background ==
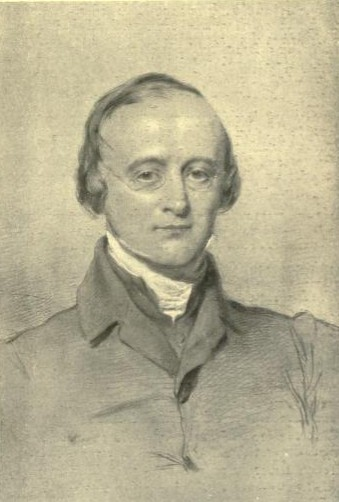
William Maskell wrote The Ancient Liturgy of the Church of England, an early work of modern liturgiology to England.

Liturgical studies of the Book of Common Prayer, the legally mandated book for liturgical worship in the Church of England, began with John Boys in the early 17th century. Several other figures – including Hamon L'Estrange, Anthony Sparrow, and Thomas Elborow – published histories of the prayer book later in the century. John Cosin's studies of the prayer book analysed its development out of medieval liturgical books of the Use of Sarum, while Charles Wheatly emphasized the novelty of the prayer book's rites and the influence of the English Reformation.

In 1832, the theologian William Palmer released Origines Liturgicae, reintroducing the study of liturgy to England. Over the next 50 years, a variety of new studies and reprinted editions of medieval English liturgical books and the Book of Common Prayer appeared. Palmer's work was appraised as "virtually an eighteenth-century book" by later Anglican liturgist Stanley Morison, who noted the influence of studies by the French Edmond Martène and Italian Francesco Antonio Zaccaria from the preceding century. Morison credited William Maskell's 1844 The Ancient Liturgy of the Church of England for initiating a modern form of English liturgical studies. The 1844 book, published by William Pickering at Chiswick Press, established the stylistic form followed by the next five decades of these studies.

Francis Procter was born in 1812 and studied at St Catharine's College, Cambridge before his 1838 ordination as a priest in the Church of England. In 1847, he departed his role as a tutor at the University of Cambridge to become vicar in Witton, Norfolk.

== Editions ==
Procter first published A History of the Book of Common Prayer, with a Rationale of its Offices in 1855. He would release further editions, integrating new material from contemporary research. The book included coverage of English liturgical history, including a summary of pre-Reformation liturgical books and an account of the failed 1689 Liturgy of Comprehension.

Liturgist John Henry Blunt, in his 1866 The Annotated Book of Common Prayer, positively acknowledged the works by Palmer, Maskell, and Philip Freeman as large studies of the Book of Common Prayer, but lauded Procter's work as "the most trustworthy and complete" account of English liturgy that remained compact. Blunt considered these 19th-century works superior to that of Wheatly and others who, according to Blunt, "a Liturgy 'compiled,' and in the main invented, by the Reformers". In his 1912 biography of Procter for the Dictionary of National Biography, liturgical historian Walter Frere wrote that the textbook "followed the lines of sound exposition laid down by Wheatley [sic] and his followers".

A History of the Book of Common Prayer was revised and expanded, into A New History of the Book of Common Prayer, by Frere with Procter's approval in 1901. Frere's revision was part of a number of similar historical studies, such as F. E. Brightman's The English Rite, which were produced by members of the Alcuin Club in the early 20th century. Frere had previously edited reprints of medieval Sarum service books for the Henry Bradshaw Society and Cambridge University Press; he would go on to become the Bishop of Truro. Describing how Procter interpreted the revised version, Frere said, "the old man was startled and a little shocked when he saw the new edition. But he took it rather well."

== Legacy ==
Often known as "Procter and Frere", Frere's 1901 revision (and his minor revisions thereof) of Procter's work was considered "the standard history" of Anglican history and "the authoritative work on the prayer book" for almost a century. With the release of Geoffrey Cuming's 1969 A History of Anglican Liturgy, which Cuming intended as an expansion upon Procter and Frere, included coverage of 20th-century Anglican texts. Cuming's work was interpreted by reviewers as superseding Procter and Frere.

The narrative in Procter and Frere regarding the 1785 American Episcopal Church's prayer book, which suggested that it was an example of liturgical revision going wrong due to an absence of episcopal input, was challenged by the 20th-century historian of the prayer book Marion J. Hatchett.
