= Geoffrey Cuming =

English Anglican liturgist and priest (1917–1988)

Geoffrey Cuming as a canon

Geoffrey John Cuming (9 September 1917 – 24 March 1988) was an English liturgist, Church of England clergyman, and music historian. After being permanently injured during his British Army service prior to the Battle of Arnhem, Cuming was ordained a priest. He authored and edited several nonfiction texts on music and Christianity.

During and after Second World War, Cuming collaborated with Francis F. Clough to compile the World's Encyclopedia of Recorded Music, a discography first published in 1952. On Christian liturgy, Cuming's work included The Durham Book on John Cosin's 17th-century proposed liturgy and A History of Anglican Liturgy. His works on Early Christian liturgies included collaborations with Ronald Jasper and a posthumously published text on the Liturgy of Saint Mark.

Cuming advised the Church of England's committees charged with producing new liturgical texts which produced the Alternative Service series, Alternative Service Book, and Common Worship. He also served as an editorial secretary for the Alcuin Club, vice-principal at St John's College, Durham, and on the faculty of both Ripon College Cuddesdon and the Church Divinity School of the Pacific.

== Early life ==
Geoffrey John Cuming was born in Gilston, Hertfordshire, on 9 September 1917. He attended Eton College, followed by Oriel College at the University of Oxford. Cuming would eventually attain three degrees at Oxford. Schoolmate Henry Chadwick described Cuming as "quiet and bookish" who demonstrated a contrasting "enthusiasm" regarding music.

As a member of the British Army's Non-Combatant Corps during the Second World War—where he was first in a bomb disposal and later in parachute ambulance unit—Cuming participated in a parachute drop before the 1944 Battle of Arnhem, resulting in a leg injury and painful, lifelong back injury. Chadwick suggested that this back injury may have contributed to both his reservedness and sympathy for others' suffering. Cuming trained at Westcott House, Cambridge, before being ordained as a priest in the Church of England, serving as a pastor.

== Career ==
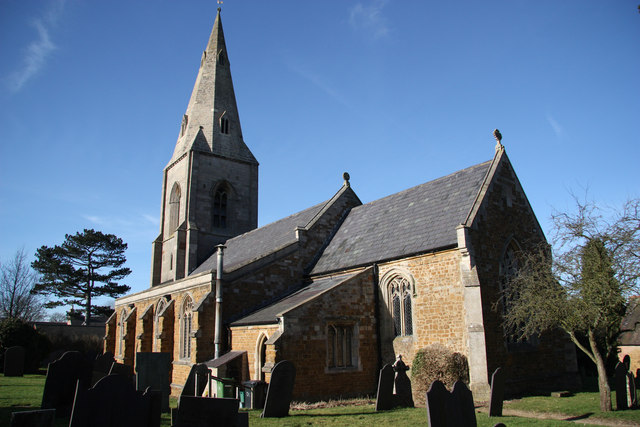
Cuming became the vicar of Billesdon (church pictured) in 1955.

Cuming was a curate for four years before being appointed the vice-principal of St John's College at the University of Durham. Later, Cuming became vicar at Billesdon in 1955. He was vicar at St. Mary's in Humberstone from 1963 until 1974. He was appointed as an honorary canon at Leicester Cathedral in 1965 before serving as the cathedral's canon theologian from 1971 until 1980. Cuming was one of the few lecturers on liturgy left in England when he retired from his lectureship at King's College London. This was followed by him working on the faculty of Ripon College Cuddesdon. He then spent three consecutive semesters teaching at the Church Divinity School of the Pacific, part of the Graduate Theological Union. Donald Gray wrote in 1982 that Cuming balanced his scholarly pursuits with his work as an Anglican pastor, saying "[t]he bulk of Geoffrey Cuming's liturgical and historical work has not been done in the atmosphere of academia, but with the interrupting knock on the vicarage door always in prospect".

Prior to and during the Second World War, Cuming cataloged new music records. Working with Francis F. Clough, Cuming performed research on recordings while Clough catalogued the findings, writing notes in a copy of the 1936 discography The Gramophone Shop Encyclopaedia of Recorded Music by Robert Donaldson Darrell. Their self-financed work continued until 1950. With Clough, Cuming edited The World's Encyclopedia of Record Music, which was published in 1952. Their text was called "huge" by music historian Harold C. Schonberg. Valentine Britten, the librarian of the BBC's Gramophone Library, referred to Clough and Cuming's work in 1956 as the library's "Bible", noting it as "authorative, and enabling one to give immediate, and usually conclusive check, on recordings deleted or extant". The book's title was criticized by Richard S. Hill in a review of its third supplement (published with E. A. Hughes and Angela Noble in 1957) for its "flamboyantly inaccurate title", saying that it was not an "encyclopedia" but rather a "discography" which only provided coverage of music from the Western world, though Hill added that "once past the title, my unhappiness evaporates, and everything seems worthy of praise".

In 1961, Cuming edited an edition of The Durham Book. An annotated Book of Common Prayer created by John Cosin with William Sancroft, the original copy of The Durham Book had largely failed to influence the revision process which produced the 1662 prayer book. Published by Durham University, Cuming's edited version and his research were positively reviewed in The Journal of Theological Studies and Historical Magazine of the Protestant Episcopal Church. In 1962, Cuming received a DD from the University of Oxford for the work, of which Henry Chadwick said "for the history of the Book of Common Prayer in the seventeenth century no work is more cardinal". From 1965 to 1972, Cuming edited for the journal Studies in Church History.

Cuming wrote A History of Anglican Liturgy, first published by Macmillan in 1969. C. W. Dugmore, Colin Buchanan, and other reviewers compared it to Francis Procter's 1855 A History of the Book of Common Prayer and Walter Frere's 1901 revision of Procter (known as "Procter and Frere"). Dugmore praised A History of Anglican Liturgy as "an authoritative and readable account" and as "an admirable supplement" to both "Procter and Frere" and Frank Edward Brightman's The English Rite. Buchanan, reviewing the first edition, criticized some "minutiae" but called it "a model of historical, and often original, scholarship". Buchanan later positively referenced the book's second edition, published in 1982, as a notable historic resource. This second edition featured details on Anglican liturgies through 1980, including the Alternative Service Book that Cuming played a part in producing.

Cuming edited other volumes on early Christian liturgies. With Ronald Jasper, Cuming authored Prayers of the Eucharist Early and Reformed, which was published in 1975 and became a textbook in courses on eucharistic history; a new edition edited by Paul F. Bradshaw and Maxwell E. Johnson was released in 2019. A study of the Liturgy of Saint Mark by Cuming was published posthumously in 1990 in the Pontifical Oriental Institute's Orientalia Christiana Analecta series. Believing that there was a gap in liturgical studies regarding Egyptian Christian liturgical practices, Cuming challenged Brightman and Charles Anthony Swainson's conclusion regarding which manuscript was the best representation of Alexandrian liturgical rites. Bryan D. Spinks positively reviewed the book for The Journal of Theological Studies, crediting Kenneth Stevenson with pushing Cuming's text through the editorial process.

== Liturgical revision ==
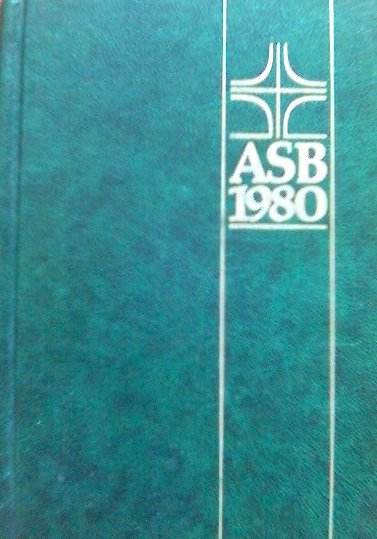
Cuming's work in the Liturgical Commission involved preparation of the Alternative Service Book (cover pictured).

In 1965, while he was the vicar of Humberstone, Cuming was appointed to the Liturgical Commission of the Church of England for his experience as a Book of Common Prayer historian. In this role, Cuming worked on the Alternative Service series and Modern Liturgical Texts. Cuming was one of five people responsible for editing the Alternative Service Book, the first liturgical text authorized for use alongside the Book of Common Prayer in the Church of England since the first Act of Uniformity in 1549. He also served as consultant to the 1981–1986 Liturgical Commission that ultimately led to the publication of Common Worship.

Cuming expressed that the 1662 prayer book's communion office "obscured and confused" Jesus's actions at the Last Supper, ignored Jesus's resurrection, lacked substantial reference to the Holy Spirit and the Old Testament, and had archaic language. Cuming was also concerned with the adaption of liturgical music to the new rites. He expressed belief that Series Two rites lent themselves to previous musical settings from John Merbecke of the 16th century to Martin Shaw of the 20th century, but found Series Three rites presented musicians with a "completely new set of texts". Cuming, "a champion of the new liturgies", was criticized by church music historian Martin Thomas as failing to communicate the basis for the revisions, something "indicative of a wider failure of communication between scholars engaged in revision and the clergy who worked with the new material".

For the October 1966 issue of Theology, Cuming wrote a study defending the phrase "we offer this bread and cup" within the eucharistic rite. In this role, Cuming worked on the Alternative Service series—a series of rites reflecting liturgical scholarship by the commission—and Modern Liturgical Texts. It was one of four such studies written for that issue, of which three favoured the phrase. The studies were responding to the evangelical Liturgical Commission member Buchanan's criticism of the phrase as too Catholic in his pamphlet The New Communion Service—Reasons for Dissent. Cuming's study focussed on 16th- and 17th-century Anglican eucharistic theology to make the case that offering the sacramental elements had long been interpreted in a memorialist fashion. Ultimately, to secure passage in the Liturgical Conference, Jasper proposed the revised form of "with this bread and cup we make the memorial of his saving passion", which was approved by Convocation and published for the Series Two communion office.

Cuming was among the first people "co-opted" by a new Church of England Liturgical Commission in 1981. In 1982, to coincide with Cuming's 65th birthday, the Society for the Promotion of Christian Knowledge (SCPK) published Liturgy Reshaped on liturgists and liturgical revision. Stevenson edited the volume, commenting in its preface that Cuming and other contemporaneous liturgiologists were not only responsible for researching historical practices but also revising liturgies in the present. Gray wrote an appreciation of Cuming for the Festschrift that praised Cuming's "erudition and encyclopedic knowledge". Gray said the Alternative Service Book "enshrined" Cuming and the Liturgical Commission's work, noting that Cuming accepted decisions of the commission despite personal opposition but, on occasion, also won "at the third or fourth round a battle apparently lost at the first". Liturgy Reshaped also included a bibliography compiled by David Tripp of Cuming's works.

The Latin chant Agnus Dei had accompanied the fraction rite in medieval liturgies. The fraction rite was removed from the Church of England's liturgy in the 1549 prayer book and the Agnus Dei was removed in the 1552 prayer book. The prayer reentered Anglican usage in the 19th century and 20th-century Anglican liturgies began reintroducing the fraction rite. Cuming produced a translation of the Agnus Dei for his modernized "translation" of the Series Two communion office that remains in widespread use. His translation was adopted by the International Consultation on English Texts and its successor, the English Language Liturgical Consultation. Cuming's Agnus Dei, which places Jesus's name at the start of each line, appears in the Alternative Service Book and Common Worship as the second, less traditional translation.

== Personal life ==
Cuming was married to Ann Rachel Lucas and had two children, a son and daughter, all three of whom survived him. Late in life, Geoffrey Cuming was known for his humour and grey beard but his disabilities caused by wartime injury left him increasingly limited in what he could do. He died at age 70 during the night of 24 March 1988 in Houston, Texas. A month prior, Cuming had a successful arterial bypass surgery; he had been discussing returning to England with his daughter during the hours preceding his death. Memorial services in both Houston and Oxford were planned, with his ashes to be interred at the latter.

== Legacy ==
The fellow position of Geoffrey Cuming Fellow in Liturgy was established at the University of Durham. The Identity of Anglican Worship, a 1991 memorial volume of 17 essays edited by Stevenson and Spinks and published by Mowbray, was compiled in his honour. Stevenson and Spinks had met at a 1978 event organized by Cuming and Gray. Cuming pressed Stevenson to author Nuptial Blessing on marriage rites, a book that was described by Spinks on Stevenson's death in 2011 as "the only serious monograph on this liturgical topic".

Gray wrote a reflection on Cuming for the 1996 They Shaped Our Worship, published by SPCK and the Alcuin Club to memorialize Anglican liturgists. Gray credited Cuming with "restoring the international reputation of Anglican liturgical scholarship" during the last 20 years of his life. Gray emphasized Cuming's influence on supporting young liturgical scholars, noting Cuming's role in establishing the Society for Liturgical Study and his election as the organization's first president.

== Selected bibliography ==
=== Books ===
==== As editor ====
- The World's Encyclopedia of Record Music. London: Sidgwick & Jackson in association with Decca Record Company. 1952. With Francis F. Clough.
- The Durham Book: Being the First Draft of Revision of the Book of Common Prayer in 1661. London: University of Durham Publications. 1961.
- Popular Belief and Practice: Papers Read at the Ninth Summer Meeting and Tenth Winter Meeting of the Ecclesiastical History Society. Cambridge: Cambridge University Press. 1972. ISBN 0-521-08220-X. LCCN 77-155583. With Derek Baker.
- The Liturgy of St Mark. Orientalia Christiana Analecta. Vol. 234. Rome: Pontifical Oriental Institute. 1990.

==== As author ====
- A History of Anglican Liturgy (1st ed.). London: St. Martin's Press, Macmillan Publishers. 1969.
- A History of Anglican Liturgy (2nd ed.). London: Macmillan Publishers. 1982. ISBN 0-333-30661-9.
- The Godly Order: Text and Studies relating to the Book of Common Prayer. Alcuin Club Collections. Vol. 65. London: Society for the Promotion of Christian Knowledge, Alcuin Club. 1983. ISBN 0-281-04059-1.

=== Chapters and articles ===
- "The English Rite: 'We offer this Bread and this Cup': 4". Theology. 69 (556): 447–453. October 1966. doi:10.1177/0040571X6606955604.
- Davies, John Gordon, ed. (1986). "Books, Liturgical: 4. Anglicanism". The New Westminster Dictionary of Liturgy and Worship. Philadelphia: Westminster Press. ISBN 0-664-21270-0.
- Cuming, G. (April 1988). "The Post-Baptismal Prayer in 'Apostolic Tradition': Further Considerations". The Journal of Theological Studies. 39 (1): 117–199. doi:10.1093/jts/39.1.117. JSTOR 23962603.
