= Francis Procter =

English liturgist and Anglican clergyman (1812–1905)

Francis Procter (21 June 1812 – 24 August 1905) was an English Anglican clergyman and liturgist known for his history of the Book of Common Prayer, the official liturgical book of the Church of England. His A History of the Book of Common Prayer, with a Rationale of its Offices was first published in 1855. A revision of this book first released in 1901 by Walter Frere–known as "Procter and Frere"–became a leading academic history of Anglican liturgy. Procter also produced other works, including an edition of the Sarum breviary first published in 1875. During his career, Procter was a fellow at St Catharine's College, Cambridge, and a minister at several English parishes.

== Early life ==
Francis Procter was born on 21 June 1812 in Hackney, London, to Francis–a warehouse worker in Manchester–and Mary Procter. He was his parents' only son. Due to poor health, Procter spent several years of his childhood at the vicarage of his uncle, Payler Procter, in Newland, Gloucestershire. He began attending Shrewsbury School under Samuel Butler in 1825. He became a student at St Catharine's College of the University of Cambridge in 1831. Another of Procter's uncles, Joseph Procter, (Note: Joseph Procter's name has also been spelled Proctor.) was the college's master. Francis Procter graduated in 1835 with a BA; he was ranked 30th wrangler and, in the Classical Tripos, eleventh in the second class.

== Career ==
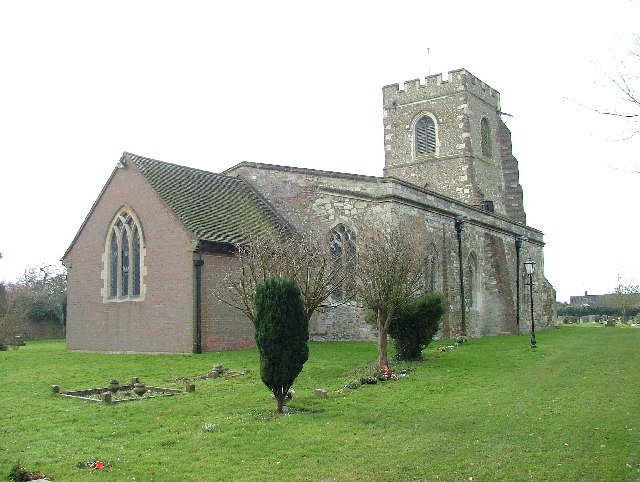
Procter was curate at St Margaret's Church, Streatley, from 1836 until 1840.

Procter was ordained a deacon in 1836 in the Diocese of Lincoln of the Church of England. He was ordained a priest in 1838 in the Diocese of Ely. He served as curate at two parishes: the Church of St Margaret, Streatley, Bedfordshire (1836–1840) and Romsey Abbey (1840–1842). In 1842, he left parochial ministry and served as a fellow and assistant tutor at his former college of St Catharine's, a position he remained at until 1847. That year, he became Vicar at Witton in Norfolk, where he remained for the rest of his life.

In 1855, Procter's A History of the Book of Common Prayer, with a Rationale of its Offices was first published. A history of the Church of England's official liturgical book, the Book of Common Prayer, Procter produced further editions that reflected the development of liturgical scholarship. According to liturgical historian Walter Frere, the textbook was in the academic tradition of Charles Wheatly's "sound exposition". Again published in 1889, the book contained what historian Stanley Morison called a "valuable" summary of service books from before the Reformation.

This book was revised and expanded by Frere with Procter's approval in 1901. The expanded version, entitled A New History of the Book of Common Prayer, was part of a number of similar early 20th-century historical studies by members of the Alcuin Club which also included F. E. Brightman's The English Rite. Also commonly known as "Procter and Frere", the 1901 revision (and minor revisions thereof) was considered "the standard history" of Anglican history until the release of Geoffrey Cuming's A History of Anglican Liturgy in 1969. (Note: In the preface to A History of Anglican Liturgy, Cuming commented that "There can be few textbooks which have had a life over a century, and it was felt that 'Procter and Frere' was beginning to show its age". Cuming also added that his history was not a "rejuvenation" of Procter and Frere's history, but "an entirely new work".)

Procter was among several 19th-century liturgical historians who were interested in the medieval breviary, a liturgical book containing the prayers of the Divine Office. Procter, jointly editing with liturgist Christopher Wordsworth and the assistance of others including Henry Bradshaw, published the first volume of their breviary in 1879 according to the Use of Sarum based on a 1531 edition printed in Paris. Procter and Wordsworth were leaders of a group of historians investigating English breviaries and their variations. The second and third volumes of their reprinted Sarum breviary were published in 1882 and 1886, respectively. (Note: There was an erroneous popular perception that the Use of Sarum was at one point the universal use of England, spurring the use's 19th-century revival. Procter and Wordsworth's edition of the Sarum breviary were not the first republished breviary. In 1854, William John Blew republished the Aberdeen Breviary; Blew's editing was derided by Morison. A previous attempt to reprint the Sarum breviary through publication by subscription failed in 1841 after the first part was published.)

== Personal life and death ==
Francis Procter married Margaret in 1848; she was the daughter of Thomas Meryon of Rye, Sussex. Together, the couple had eight children: five sons and three daughters. Procter died on 24 August 1905 in Witton and was buried in the parish's churchyard.
