= Gabriel Hebert =

English monk and liturgist (1886–1963)

The Reverend Gabriel Hebert SSM
- Born: Arthur Gabriel Hebert; 28 May 1886; Silloth, Cumberland, England
- Died: 26 July 1963 (aged 77)

Ecclesiastical career
- Religion: Christianity (Anglican)
- Church: Church of England
- Ordained: 1911 (deacon); 1912 (priest)

Academic background
- Education: New College, Oxford
- Influences: Gustaf Aulén; Lambert Beauduin; Edmund Bishop; Yngve Brilioth; Ildefons Herwegen; F. D. Maurice

Academic work
- Discipline: Theology
- Sub-discipline: Biblical theology; liturgics
- School or tradition: Anglo-Catholicism; parish communion movement
- Notable works: Liturgy and Society (1935); The Parish Communion (1937)
- Influenced: Yngve Brilioth; Michael Ramsey; Donald Robinson

Arthur Gabriel Hebert (Note: Pronounced /hiːbɜːrt/ HEE-burt.) SSM (1886–1963) was an English monk of Kelham, Nottinghamshire (more strictly a member of the Society of the Sacred Mission), and a proponent within Anglicanism of the ideas of the Liturgical Movement.

Hebert was very much aware of the social implications of liturgical renewal in Continental Europe through contact with Benedictine monasteries in Austria and Germany as well as having contact with artists in Protestant circles in Switzerland.

Furthermore, his interactions with the high church Lutheran movement in Sweden led to becoming a translator of several works from Swedish to English. This included Gustaf Aulén's groundbreaking book on the atonement, Christus Victor, when it was published in English in 1931. Aulén would later say in his autobiography that it was Hebert that came up with that name for the work and that he preferred the Englishman's name for it than his own, Den Kristna Försoningstanken (SV. = EN. The Christian Concept of Reconciliation). Hebert would also translate Part I of Anders Nygren's important work Eros och Agape into English in 1932.

Hebert was, in some respects, a disciple of Gregory Dix.

== Early life ==
Hebert was born on 28 May 1886 in Silloth, Cumberland, the son of the priest Septimus Hebert and his wife Caroline Charlotte Haslam. He was educated at Harrow School. He graduated from New College, Oxford, with first-class honours in literae humaniores in 1908 and with first-class honours in theology in 1909. Following his ordination to the diaconate in 1911, Hebert was priested in 1912.

== Works ==
- translator of Eucharistic Faith and Practice by Yngve Brilioth, London: SPCK, 1930
- translator of Christus Victor: An Historical Study of the Three Main Types of the Idea of Atonement, by Gustaf Aulén, London: SPCK, 1931
- translator of Agape and Eros - a study of the Christian idea of love. Part I, by Anders Nygren, London: SPCK, 1932
- Liturgy and Society, London: Faber and Faber, 1935
- The Parish Eucharist, 1936
- The Throne of David, 1941
- The Form of the Church, 1945
- contributor to Catholicity: a study in the conflict of Christian traditions in the west / being a report presented to...the Archbishop of Canterbury, Westminster: Dacre Press, 1947
- The Authority of the Old Testament, London: Faber and Faber, 1947
- Fundamentalism and the Church of God, Philadelphia: Westminster, 1957
- The Christ of Faith and the Jesus of History, London: SCM Press, 1962
- The Old Testament from Within, London: Oxford, 1962
- Apostle and Bishop: a study of the Gospel, the ministry, and the Church-community, London: Faber and Faber, 1963
- contributor to True Worship, ed. Lancelot Sheppard, Baltimore : London: Helicon Press; Darton, Longman & Todd, 1963
- Articles in The Expository Times

== See also ==
- Parish Communion movement
