= Atchley =

Atchley is a surname. Notable people with the surname include:

- Ben Atchley (1930–2018), American politician
- E. G. Cuthbert F. Atchley, English liturgical scholar
- Fred Atchley, American politician
- Hooper Atchley (1887–1943), American actor
- Justin Atchley (born 1973), American baseball player
- Kenneth Atchley (born 1954), American composer
