= Alternative Service Book =

Church of England prayer book

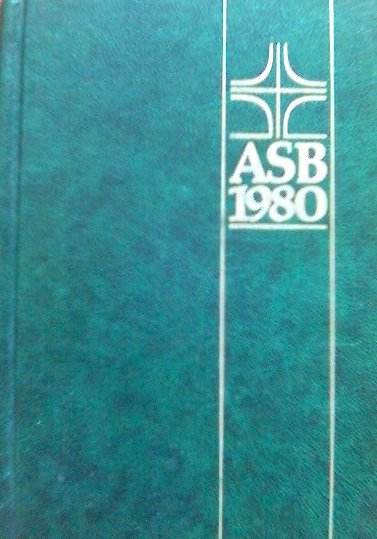
Front cover of the Alternative Service Book — ASB 1980.

The Alternative Service Book 1980 (ASB) was a Church of England service book and the first complete prayer book produced by the Church since 1662. It was conceived not as a replacement for the 1662 Book of Common Prayer (BCP), but as an alternative corresponding broadly to it in content. In practice, however, the ASB became sufficiently widespread to replace the BCP extensively in ordinary use. Its popularity led printers to issue several editions in rapid succession, while churches that continued to use the BCP increasingly drew attention to that choice. The Prayer Book Society complained that churches using the older prayer book were becoming difficult to find and that theological colleges were failing to introduce students to it. The ASB was subsequently replaced by Common Worship.

The services of the ASB incorporated liturgical changes introduced for theological and historical reasons and modernized the older language of the BCP, most conspicuously in "Holy Communion Rite A". The book was the product of approximately twenty-five years of committee work together with revisions by the General Synod; its resulting language was criticized as prosaic and awkward.

== Earlier attempts at reform ==
=== Preparatory work ===
Following the failure of the attempts to introduce a new prayer book through Parliament in the 1920s, liturgical reform had idled.

Some Anglo-Catholic parishes used the English Missal, a version of the BCP which included the prayers of the Roman Missal both in translation and in the original interspersed with prayers from the prayer book; most used either the BCP or the 1928 Prayer Book, which though it was never approved has continued in print until the present with the warning "The publication of this book does not directly or indirectly imply that it can be regarded as authorized for use in churches." As time passed and liturgical scholarship proceeded, it became clear that a new attempt should be made to provide orders of service for the church. In an attempt to break the deadlock, Dom Gregory Dix, in his book The Shape of the Liturgy published in 1945, proposed that his own thinking about the Eucharist, using what he called the "Four Action Shape", be the basis of a rite. He suggested that such a rite be produced by a number of bishops, too many for them to be victimised but not so many so as to suggest rebellion, who would allow such a rite to be used in their own dioceses but who would not protect parish clergy from legal challenge if they used it. Dix's ideas were very influential but no one took up the suggestion.

=== Alternative Services Series 1, 2, and 3 ===
Only in 1955 did the church set up the Liturgical Commission and ten years later the Church Assembly passed the Prayer Book (Alternative and Other Services) Measure 1965. A series of books followed, most becoming authorised for use in 1966 or 1967: the Series 1 (formally "Alternative Services Series 1") communion book scarcely differed from the 1928 book (as was the case with its wedding service). Series 2, issued at the same time, put forward a form which followed the Dix formula: offertory, consecration, fraction, communion. This was a pattern which was to be widely influential in countries which had used the BCP.

Series 3 was less dependent on and, by implication, more reflective of criticism of Dix. It was also published as a collection of individual booklets for different services, between January 1973 (Holy Communion) and November 1977 (Marriage). The evidence for the offertory had been challenged from left and right by liturgical scholars such as Colin Buchanan and Ronald Jasper: it had been championed by the adherents of the Liturgical Movement but came to be regarded as suspect not only by evangelicals. In his Durham Essays and Addresses, Michael Ramsey had warned against a "shallow Pelagianism" which it seemed to betoken. Eric Lionel Mascall asked "what can we offer at the Eucharist?". (Contrary views were expressed by people such as Donald Gray and Roger Arguile, partly on the ground that, following the writings of St Irenaeus, the goodness of the natural order and its relation to the Eucharist was an important element; the offertory brought the world into church). The fraction, or breaking of the bread, was criticised on the grounds that it was not nearly as significant as the consecration or administration; it was largely a practical act. Other services were less controversial and some scarcely surfaced, including the funeral service, which never went beyond the draft stage. The baptism service, allowing more responses from the godparents and being considerably less wordy than the BCP, became popular.

== Birth of the book ==
In 1974, the Worship and Doctrine Measure, passed by the new General Synod allowed the production of a new book which was to contain everything that would be required of priest and congregation: daily Morning and Evening Prayer, Holy Communion, initiation services (Baptism and Confirmation), marriage, funeral services, the Ordinal, Sunday readings, a lectionary and a psalter. Once again, after a gap of nearly fifteen years, parishes which did not want to use the Book of Common Prayer had in their hands all the words, including readings ordered according to themes and with a two-year cycle.

Discussion in General Synod was lengthy. Hundreds of amendments to the initial proposals were debated on the floor of the chamber. Debate about the significance of the communion was taken up again. Since very many more parishes had, following the influence of the Parish Communion movement, already adopted the Eucharist as their main service, debates about it became even more pertinent.

== Contents ==
The book was very variable in the degree to which it departed from the Book of Common Prayer. The Offices of Morning and Evening Prayer provided alternative canticles and all were now ecumenically approved translations, the so-called ICET texts (English Language Liturgical Consultation), but the form was conservative. In addition, a shorter order was provided for weekdays.

There were two forms of the Holy Communion, Rite A and Rite B. Rite A allowed for the Confession to come at the beginning of the service, following Roman practice; it gave space for extempore prayers in the intercessions and introduced the rubric 'or other suitable words' which were to become normative in modern liturgical books, allowing as it did, a departure from the form set down. The Prayer of Humble Access was removed to a place before the Offertory – styled 'the Preparation of the Gifts' and the Four Action Shape was thus given prominence. There were four Eucharistic prayers, a new departure, one of which derived from Cranmer's form, two from the earlier experiments and one from work done between two scholars, one Evangelical and one Catholic, during the progress of the debates; it owed much to a prayer from the Ordo Missae of the Roman Catholic Church. All were heavily dependent on scholarly acceptance of the primacy of a third-century work usually termed the Apostolic Tradition attributed to Hippolytus, and which had been critically edited and published early in the 20th century. Rite B retained a version of Elizabethan language and prayers from the BCP such as the Prayer for the Church Militant (for which an alternative was allowed), and the first Eucharistic Prayer. The word 'Offertory' (though without indication of any actions) survived after the Peace. The Prayer of Oblation, a shortened version of the first Prayer of Thanksgiving in the BCP, was added to conform to the modern pattern. However, Rite A (but not Rite B) was permitted to be said following the order of the Book of Common Prayer, a concession to those who valued Cranmer's 1552 abbreviation of the eucharistic prayer and generally used by conservative evangelicals.

A new rite for Thanksgiving after Adoption preceded the revision of the Old 'Churching of Women' service. Baptism could now be incorporated into the main Sunday service, the result of other influences intended to bring it back into the mainstream of worship. The Baptism of those able to answer for themselves was much more prominent, a result of the influence of those who questioned infant baptism in a post-Christian society. The questions, however, now addressed to the godparents or the person baptised directly, no longer required the renunciation of the devil or 'the vain pomp and glory of the world' or 'the carnal desires of the flesh' but instead a turning to Christ, a repentance from sin and a renunciation of evil. Likewise the ancient Apostles Creed was replaced by three tritheistic questions, which were criticised (by, among others, John Habgood, sometime Archbishop of York) as being unknown to the credal discussions of the Church, Eastern or Western, modern or ancient.

The Marriage rite followed the 1928 book in no longer suggesting that men might be 'like brute beasts that have no understanding' and allowed readings and a sermon (which the BCP had not). It added words for the giving and receiving of the ring and made provision for a communion.

The Funeral service officially allowed the coffin into Church, though Church funerals – or in a crematorium – had not ceased with Cranmer. It no longer excluded suicides or the unbaptised: the rubric was simply omitted. The deceased was not to be addressed directly, as had been the case before the Reformation, but a form of committal was now included: the deceased was "entrust[ed] to '[God's] merciful keeping'".

A two-year cycle of readings was provided, to which thematic titles were given. These proved not very hardwearing – they did not always adequately reflect the readings and were considered too narrow in their scope; It was not long before priests, if not parishioners, noticed that in spite of the huge increase in the amount of Scripture heard – there were now three readings, Old Testament, New Testament and Gospel, much was missed out. When the reading aloud of the Bible at home and Scripture as the basis of Religious Education were the rule, this may not have mattered; people's general knowledge of the Bible was broader. Now that both had disappeared it did. Moreover, the readings jumped from book to book week by week following the themes. It was not therefore possible to follow the thought of a particular biblical writer, something that was noted by the Liturgical Commission and was corrected in the ASB's successor, Common Worship. The book was also the high point of Tractarian influence: apart from retaining something of the Four Action Shape of Gregory Dix, there were set lections for the Blessing of An Abbot, for Those Taking Vows and for Vocations to Religious Communities. These were to disappear in 2000. The same applied to the Saints who would no longer be distinguished as to whether they were Martyrs, Teachers or Confessors. There was a good range of Prefaces to the Eucharistic Prayers, including one for St. Michael and All Angels (for which festival there is now no such provision).

The Sunday Lectionary originated in the work of the Joint Liturgical Group, an English ecumenical grouping. The Weekday lectionary which, for the first time provided Eucharistic Readings for every day of the year, originated with the Weekday Missal of the Roman Catholic Church.

== Further changes ==
The ASB survived until the turn of the Millennium. General Synod learned not to repeat the time-hungry debates through which it had been born, and had amended standing orders allowing for a much more expeditious means of liturgical revision. The Daily or Sunday offices had been superseded in many churches by less formal forms – the Services of the Word – which accommodated the desire of some Evangelicals, particularly those in the charismatic tradition, not to be bound very much by liturgical forms, and by the growing popularity of informal family services. Additional material had been provided for use by General Synod in such books as 'Patterns for Worship' and seasonal material in the book 'Lent, Holy Week and Easter' and, for the winter seasons of Advent, Christmas and Epiphany, in 'The Promise of his Glory'. Some parishes were using the Roman Catholic-derived Revised Common Lectionary, which allowed each Biblical writer to speak in his own voice and on a three-year cycle. The intention had been to replace the ASB and the time seemed ripe. The single, if somewhat bulky book that the ASB was, was replaced by a series of books, none of which include readings, and by software packages and online support. This was Common Worship.

Another notable change, observed during the life of the ASB, was that the text of the Lord's Prayer was originally printed in Rite A only in the modern English form, but later editions printed a more "traditional" version (but adapted to modern grammar - "Our Father, who art in heaven" rather than the BCP's "Our Father, which art in heaven") side by side.
