= Godfrey Bingley =

Godfrey Bingley (1842–1927) was a British photographer, engineer, amateur geologist, local historian, and iron founder. Bingley is remarkable for the number and quality of photographs he took around the United Kingdom and abroad.

== Early life ==
Bingley was born on 3 July 1842 in Leeds to Godfrey Martin Bingley and Mary Walker. His father was a newspaper reporter and shorthand writer. By 1854 the family was living with Bingley's maternal grandfather Thomas Walker and Bingley's father was in business with his father-in-law as a carpet yarn spinner.

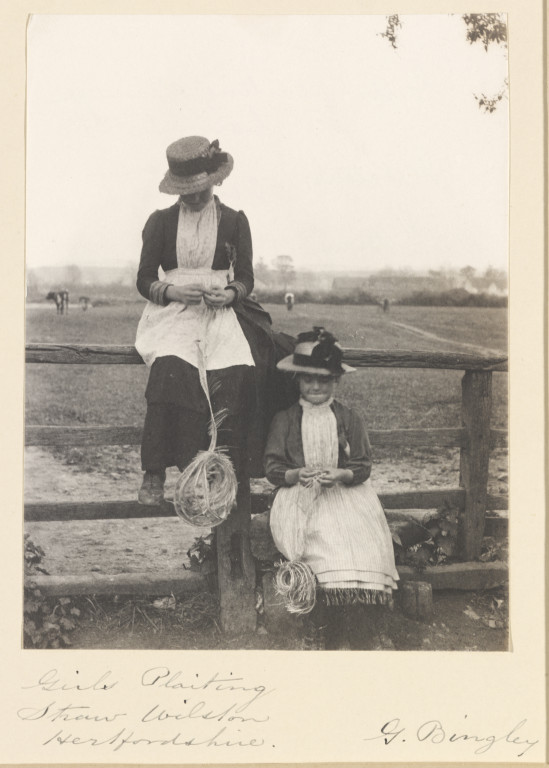
Two girls plating straw for bonnets etcetera at Wilston, Hertfordshire . Taken by Godfrey Bingley.

In 1858 Bingley became apprenticed as an engineer to his uncle John Bingley at Harper Street Foundry in Leeds. The foundry built hydraulic presses, steam engines and other machinery.

== Photography ==
By the age of 42 Bingley was able to retire and developed an interest in dry glass plate photography and its technical capabilities. He subsequently travelled around Yorkshire and more widely around Britain and Europe, taking photographs which reflected his interests in geology, history and travel. Bingley's many photographs formed a record of his contemporary Yorkshire landscape. They often captured important everyday elements of rural life. He also made two trips to the Americas. In 1890, he travelled to Mexico, Central America, Colombia, and Venezuela. In 1896, he returned to Mexico. He would later travel to southern Africa.

In 1895, he joined the Yorkshire Geological Society and became a life member. The Council of the society commended Bingley for providing them with an impressive collection of photographs of geological subjects in Yorkshire. He was elected as chairman in 1898. By 1909 he was the president of the society and vice-president in 1922. For much of his photographic career, Bingley served as an assistant to Professor Percy Kendall, who held one of the first chairs in Geology at the University of Leeds. Many of his photographs were used to illustrate Kendall and Wroot's Geology of Yorkshire: An Illustration of the Evolution of Northern England.

In 1899 Bingley was elected to serve on the Council of the Photographic Convention of the United Kingdom, along with Alfred Horsley Hinton, Henry Peach Robinson and Henry Snowden Ward.

A member of the Leeds Camera Club, Bingley was in charge of a group of club photographers who took photographs for the Yorkshire Survey. The group were asked to take images of Kirkstall Abbey for William St John Hope's 'History of Kirkstall Abbey'. Bingley showed his knowledge of the technical capabilities of photographic equipment when he commented that it was not yet capable of taking the detailed image requested by the author.

Bingley was also a member of the Thorseby Society and led their photographic section, contributing to illustrated guides of Leeds in the period. He was active in the Liberal Party.

Towards the end of his career, he began to experiment with nitrocellulose, or nitrate film. In 1910 he was living at "Thorniehurst", Shaw Lane, Headingley. Failing eyesight forced him to give up photography and in 1913 he donated his archive of around 10,000 photographic negatives to the University of Leeds. He died in 1927.

== Family life ==
In 1878 Bingley married Elizabeth Huckvale; the couple had two daughters: Edith born in 1879 and Mary Gertrude born in 1882.
