= E. G. Cuthbert F. Atchley =

English surgeon and liturgical scholar

Edward Godfrey Cuthbert Frederick Atchley MRCS LRCP (1869–1943) was an English surgeon and Anglican liturgical scholar associated with the Alcuin Club.

He was a member of the Royal College of Physicians and the Royal College of Surgeons.

He wrote numerous books and journal articles. His work on the use of incense in worship has been cited in modern medical and anthropological monographs and journal articles.

He also was a local historian of Bristol. Among other topics, he wrote descriptions of historic churches, such as an examination of parish records for St. Nicholas Church, Bristol; this work has particular value because the records were destroyed subsequently during the Bristol Blitz.

He was a member of the Henry Bradshaw Society.

He was married to May Florence Heriot Atchley.

His papers in seventeen volumes are in the Lambeth Palace Archives.

== Works ==
- Essays on Ceremonial (1904)
- (editor) Ordo Romanus Primus (1905)
- The People's Prayers: Being Some Considerations on the Use of the Litany in Public Worship (1906)
- 'On the Mediaeval Parish Records of the Church of St. Nicholas, Bristol', Transactions of the St. Paul's Ecclesiological Society 6 (October 1906); 35-67.
- 'Some inventories of the parish church of St. Stephen, Bristol', Transactions of the St Paul's Ecclesiological Society, 6, part 3 (1908), 161-84.
- (translator, introduction) The Ambrosian Liturgy: The Ordinary and Canon of the Mass according to the Rite of the Church of Milan (1909)
- A History of the Use of Incense in Divine Worship (1909)
- (with Sir William St. John Hope), An Introduction to English Liturgical Colours (SPCK, 1920)
- 'Some More Bristol Inventories', Transactions of the St. Paul's Ecclesiological Society, 9 Part 2 (1922), 1-50.
- The Parish Clerk and His Right to Read the Liturgical Epistle (1924)
- On the Epiclesis of the Eucharistic Liturgy and in the Consecration of the Font (1935)
