= Bryan D. Spinks =

British liturgical scholar

Bryan Douglas Spinks FRHistS (born 23 December 1948) is Bishop F. Percy Goddard Professor of Liturgical Studies and Pastoral Theology at Yale Divinity School, the Yale Institute of Sacred Music, and Berkeley Divinity School. He is a British priest in the Church of England and officiates in the Episcopal Church in the United States.

== Life ==
He was born in Braintree, Essex and lived in Black Notley, Essex, where he attended Black Notley Church of England Primary School; Endsleigh School, Colchester; and Braintree County High School. Spinks attended St. Chad's College at the University of Durham where he earned an honours Theology degree in 1970 (Class 2, Div. 1) while studying under Canon Arthur Couratin. He also earned a postgraduate diploma in Theology with distinction on a Lightfoot Scholarship. Following this, Spinks earned an M.Th. in Liturgy under the supervision of Ronald Jasper and Geoffrey Cuming.

Spinks completed ordination training at St. Chad's College but was under the canonical age for ordination and so worked for a short time in employment with the Essex County Council. He was ordained a deacon in 1975 and a priest in 1976.

In 1978, he was successfully examined for the Durham BD on English Reformed liturgy, which was subsequently published as two books. He also studied Syriac liturgy with Sebastian Brock and published papers on East Syrian liturgy.

In 1981, he was appointed chaplain to the chapel at Churchill College, Cambridge. He was also an affiliated lecturer in Liturgy in the Faculty of Divinity, Cambridge (1981–1997). He served two curacies in the diocese of Chelmsford (1975–1979). He served on the Church of England Liturgical Commission (1986–1995) and as a consultant (1996–2000).

In 1988, he was successfully examined for the Durham DD, the highest examined doctorate in Theology in English universities.

In 1998, he was appointed Bishop F. Percy Goddard Professor of Liturgical Studies and Pastoral Theology at Yale Divinity School, the Yale Institute of Sacred Music, and Berkeley Divinity School.

Spinks is a past chair of the Society for Liturgical Study, a past president of the Scottish Church Service Society (the only Anglican and non-Presbyterian thus far to hold this office), and a past president of the Society for Oriental Liturgy. He has published widely on early Christian, Syrian, Anglican, Reformed, and contemporary liturgy. In 2021, he was invited to give the Aidan Kavanagh Lecture in Liturgical Studies at the Yale Institute of Sacred Music. Since 1998, he has served as a priest in the Middlesex Area Cluster Network of Parishes in Connecticut.

== Selected works ==
- Addai and Mari- The Anaphora of the Apostles: A Text for Students. Grove Liturgical Study 24, Bramcote 1980. ISBN 0 905422 93 7
- Luther's Liturgical Criteria and His Reform of the Canon of the Mass. Grove Liturgical Study 30, Bramcote 1982. ISBN 0 907536 24 7
- Freedom or Order? The Eucharistic Liturgy in English Congregationalism 1645–1980. Pittsburgh Theological Monographs New series 8. Pickwick Publications, Allison Park 1984. ISBN 0 915138 60 3
- From the Lord, and the Best Reformed Churches: A Study of the Eucharistic Liturgy in the English Puritan and Separatist Traditions 1550–1633. Bibliotheca Ephemerides Liturgicae Subsidia 33. Edizioni Liturgiche, Rome 1985.
  - 2004 paperback ISBN 9781556350436
- The Sanctus in the Eucharistic Prayer. Cambridge University Press, Cambridge 1991. ISBN 0 521 39307 8
- Western Use and Abuse of the Eastern Liturgical Tradition. Centre for Indian and Inter-religious Studies, Rome and Bangalore 1993.
- Worship: Prayers from the East. Pastoral Press, Washington 1993. ISBN 1 56929 000 8
- (With J.R.K.Fenwick) Worship in Transition. Highlights of the Liturgical Movement.T & T Clark, Edinburgh and Continuum, New York 1995. ISBN 0 567 29279 7
- Two Faces of Elizabethan Anglican Theology: Sacraments and Salvation in the Thought of William Perkins and Richard Hooker, Drew University Studies in Liturgy 9, Scarecrow Press 1999.ISBN 0-8108-3677-7
- Mar Nestorius and Mar Theodore the Interpreter: The Forgotten Eucharistic Prayers of East Syria, Alcuin/GROW Liturgical Study 45, Cambridge 1999.ISBN 1-85174-422-3
- Sacraments, Ceremonies and the Stuart Divines: Sacramental Theology and Liturgy in England and Scotland 1603–1662. Ashgate Publishing, Aldershot and Burlington 2001. ISBN 0754614751
- Early and Medieval Rituals and Theologies of Baptism: From the New Testament to the Council of Trent, Ashgate Publishing Aldershot and Burlington 2006. ISBN 9780754614289
- Reformation and Modern Rituals and Theologies of Baptism: From Luther to Contemporary Practices. Ashgate Publishing, Aldershot and Burlington 2006. ISBN 9780754656975
- Liturgy in the Age of Reason: Worship and Sacraments in England and Scotland 1662-c,1800, Ashgate, Aldershot and Burlington 2009. ISBN 9781032099538
- The Worship Mall: Liturgical Initiatives and Responses in a Postmodern Global World, SPCK London 2010; Church House Publishing US edition, 2011. ISBN 9780898696752
- Do This in Remembrance of Me: The Eucharist from the Early Church to the Present Day, SCM Press, London 2013. ISBN 9780334043768
- The Rise and Fall of the ‘Incomparable Liturgy’: The Book of Common Prayer 1559–1906, SPCK London 2017. ISBN 9780281076055
- Luther's Liturgical Criteria and His Reform of the Canon of the Mass (Independent publication of earlier monograph) ISBN 9798582400288
- Scottish Presbyterian Worship: Proposals for Organic Change, 1843 to the Present Day. Edinburgh: St. Andrew Press, 2020. ISBN 9781800830004
- contributor, From Anchorhold to Parish: English Monasticism and Anglican Spirituality, The James Lloyd Breck Conference on Monasticism and The Church, 2022. ISBN 9780979224386
