= Ritology =

Ritology, also called ritual studies or ritualistics, is the study of rites and rituals. The ritology focuses most directly on enactment and performance, that is, it gives priority to the acts and actions of people. A secondary focus is on the words, text, or objects used in the rituals.

== See also ==
- Liturgics
