= Malines Conversations =

Conversations between the Roman Catholic church and the Church of England in the 1920s

The Malines Conversations were a series of five informal ecumenical conversations held from 1921 to 1927 which explored possibilities for the corporate reunion between the Roman Catholic Church and the Church of England, forming one stage of Anglican–Roman Catholic dialogue.

== History ==
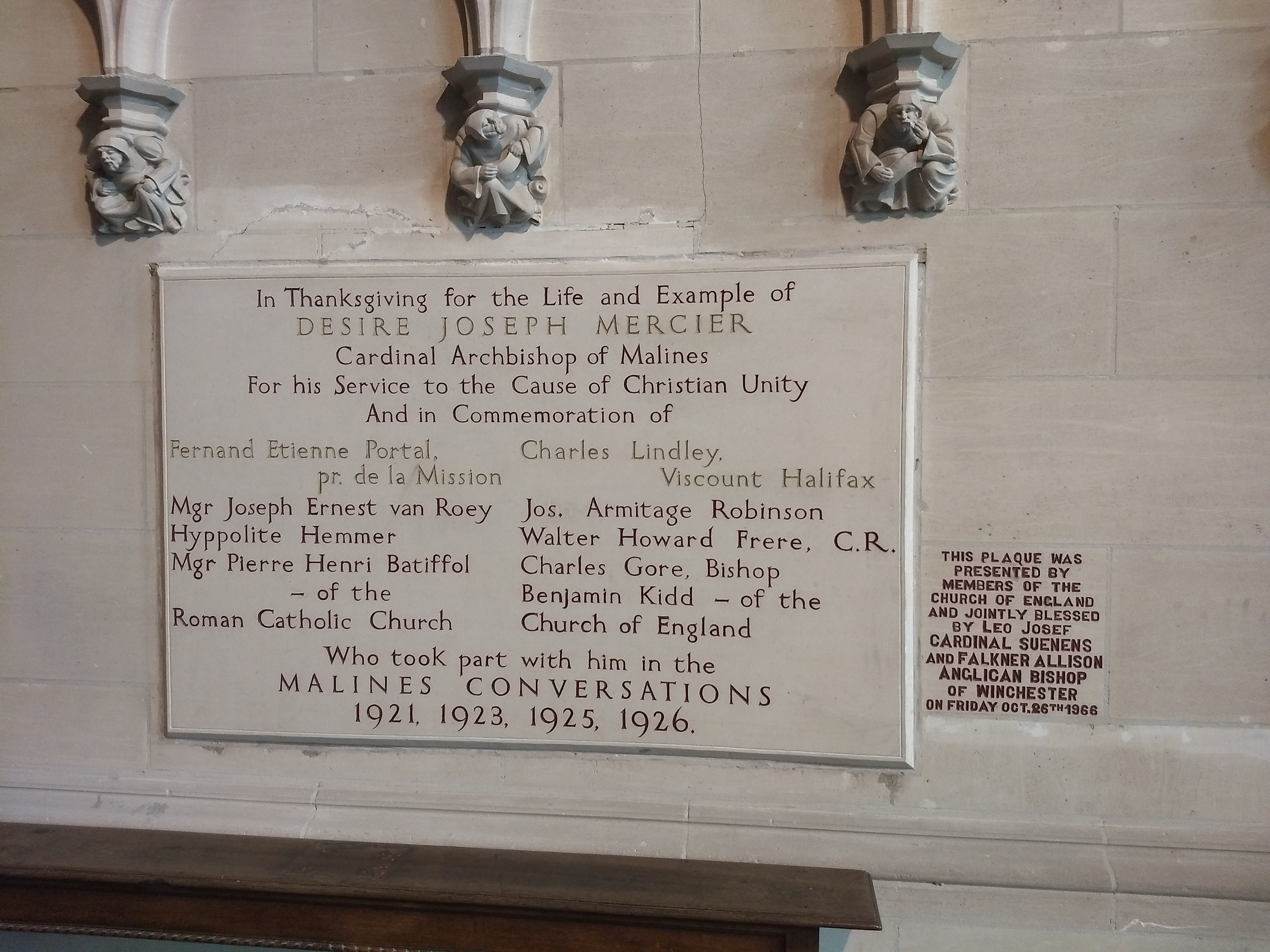
Plaque in St Rumbold's Cathedral, Mechelen (Malines), commemorating Cardinal Mercier and the Malines Conversations

The impetus for the conversations emerged largely out of the friendship between the high church Anglican, Charles Wood, 2nd Viscount Halifax, and the French Roman Catholic priest Fernand Portal. Although the ultramontane attitudes of the Roman Catholic hierarchy in Great Britain made direct talks between British Anglicans and British Roman Catholics infeasible, the Lambeth Appeal of 1920 opened doors to Roman Catholics on the continent. Cardinal Désiré Joseph Mercier, Archbishop of Malines, agreed to host the private ecumenical discussions desired by Lord Halifax and Abbé Portal. The conversations were held in the Belgian primatial see of Malines (being the French name for the city of Mechelen) from 1921 to 1927 with tacit support from the Vatican and the archbishops of Canterbury and York, Randall Davidson and Cosmo Gordon Lang respectively.

The number of participants varied but included on the Anglican side Lord Halifax, bishops Walter Frere and Charles Gore, and Armitage Robinson (Dean of Wells). The Roman Catholic participants included Mercier himself, Pierre Batiffol, Hippolyte Hemmer, Portal and Mercier's successor, Jozef-Ernest van Roey, who wound up the conversations in 1927. A consensus emerged during the five conversations, of which only the first four proved substantial, that the Anglican Church should be "reunited" with—not simply "subsumed" by—the Roman Church. Dom Lambert Beauduin's 1925 paper "L'église anglicane unie, mais non absorbée" was particularly remarked.

Van Roey was personally less favourable to the idea of unity than his predecessor, and Cardinal Bourne, Archbishop of Westminster, successfully urged the Vatican to withdraw its encouragement, in line with Leo XIII's bull Apostolicae curae (1896), which had denied validity to Anglican orders. Although the conversations provoked controversy in both churches and failed to produce concrete results, they did pave the way toward future ecumenical discussions between Roman Catholics and Anglicans.

== Bibliography ==
- Walter Howard Frere, Recollections of Malines, 1935.
- George Bell, Life of Randall Davidson, 1935.
- Bernard Barlow, ‘A Brother Knocking at the Door’ The Malines Conversations 1921-1925. Norwich: The Canterbury Press, 1996.
- Balthasar Fischer, Lexikon für Theologie und Kirche, Band 2, 1994, p. 110.
- John A. Dick, The Malines Conversations Revisited. Leuven: University Press, 1989.
