= Gregory Dix =

English Benedictine monk (1901–1952)

The Reverend Dom Gregory Dix OSB
- Prior of Nashdom Abbey
- Church: Church of England
- In office: 1948 to 1952

Orders
- Ordination: 1924 (deacon); 1925 (priest)

Personal details
- Born: 4 October 1901 London, England
- Died: 12 May 1952 (aged 50) Burnham, Buckinghamshire, England
- Buried: Nashdom Abbey, Burnham, Buckinghamshire, England
- Denomination: Anglicanism
- Education: Merton College, Oxford

Sainthood
- Feast day: 12 May
- Venerated in: Church of England

George Eglinton Alston Dix OSB (4 October 1901 – 12 May 1952), known as Gregory Dix, was a British monk and priest of Nashdom Abbey, an Anglican Benedictine community. He was a noted liturgical scholar whose work had particular influence on the reform of Anglican liturgy in the mid-20th century.

== Life ==
Dix was born on 4 October 1901 in Woolwich, south London. He was the son of Mary Jane Dix, a Methodist, and George Henry Dix, a schoolmaster and Anglo-Catholic priest who served as the first principal of the College of St Mark and St John, Chelsea. He was educated at Westminster School and became an exhibitioner at Merton College, Oxford. His modest degree did not reflect his real ability and from 1924 to 1926 he was appointed lecturer in modern history at Keble College, Oxford, while studying at Wells Theological College. He was made deacon on 5 October 1924 and was ordained priest on 4 October 1925. He entered Nashdom the following year and was sent to the Gold Coast as a novice until his health broke down in 1929.

Returning to Nashdom he became an intern oblate and took his final vows only in 1940. During the Second World War he lived for a while in Beaconsfield, Buckinghamshire, and looked after the Anglo-Catholic daughter church of St Michael whilst his brother Ronald, who was the priest there, served as a military chaplain. With another monk he lived in the parsonage, kept the round of monastic offices and cared for the parish. On his return to Nashdom he was succeeded in Beaconsfield by Augustine Morris, who was to become Abbot of Nashdom in 1948. Dix was elected to the Convocation in 1945 and prior of his abbey in 1948.

=== Scholarly work ===
As a scholar, Dix worked primarily in the field of liturgical studies. He produced an edition of the Apostolic Tradition in 1935. In The Shape of the Liturgy, first published in 1945, he argued that it was not so much the words of the liturgy but its "shape" which mattered. His study of the liturgy's historical development led him to formulate what is called the four-action shape of the liturgy: offertory, prayer, fraction, communion. Dix's work then influenced liturgical revision in the Anglican Communion. More recent scholars, however, have criticised it as lacking historical accuracy. Dix's conclusion that "Cranmer in his eucharistic doctrine was a devout and theologically founded Zwinglian, and that his Prayer Books were exactly framed to express his convictions" also proved controversial.

In particular, Dix's claims for the "shape" of the liturgy, which laid emphasis on the significance of the offertory, have been argued to rest on weak evidence historically. On the other hand, Dix's thesis was defended by members of the English Parish Communion movement, such as Gabriel Hebert and Donald Gray, who saw the offertory as representing the bringing of the world into the eucharistic action. This is also the traditional Eastern Orthodox perspective on the offertory.

=== Ecclesiastical politics ===
Dix was an Anglican Papalist, who sought reunion with the Holy See and was against any developments which might make such a union impossible. He therefore campaigned against the projected church union in South India, which he saw as a possible model for similar schemes in England, and which in his view equated Anglican and free church ordinations. "If these proposals were to be put into practice, the whole ground for believing in the Church of England which I have outlined would have ceased to exist." A by-product of his campaign was the book of essays entitled The Apostolic Ministry, published in 1946 and edited by Kenneth Kirk with a contribution by Dix.

In 1944 Dix defended Anglican orders against Roman Catholic critics. Believing that "Unless we are 'Catholics' inasmuch and because we are 'Anglicans', then we are not being 'Catholics'", he stated that "For three centuries the C. of E. taught the essentials of the Catholic Faith and ministered the essential Catholic Sacraments to the ordinary English people, when no one else could, or would have been allowed by the state to do. That is her title to exist, and I think a man could and should love her for that, even if he felt that he must leave her now." In explaining his oft-repeated description of the Anglican episcopate as Edwardian, he commented "Strictly Edward VI in theology; strictly Edward VII in mental equipment and strictly Edward VIII in their views on marriage."

=== Death ===
Dix died of intestinal cancer on 12 May 1952 at Grovefield House (near Nashdom). He was described by Kenneth Kirk, Bishop of Oxford, as "my closest and oldest friend, and the most brilliant man in the Church of England". He was buried at Nashdom Abbey.

Gregory Dix is remembered in the Church of England with a commemoration on 12 May.
