= William Henry St John Hope =

English antiquary (1854–1919)

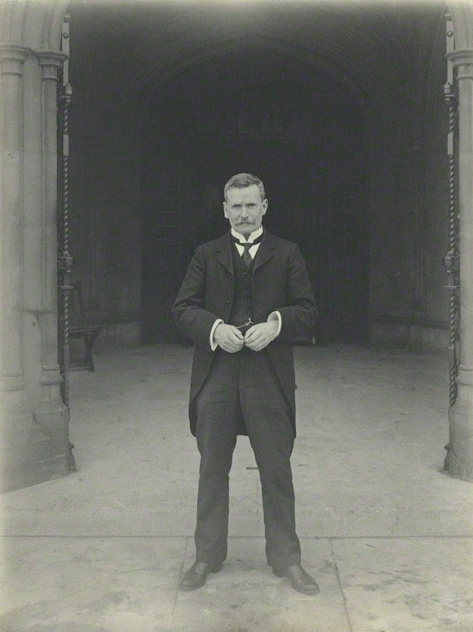
1909 portrait of Hope by Sir Benjamin Stone

Sir William Henry St John Hope (1854–1919) was an English antiquary.

== Life ==
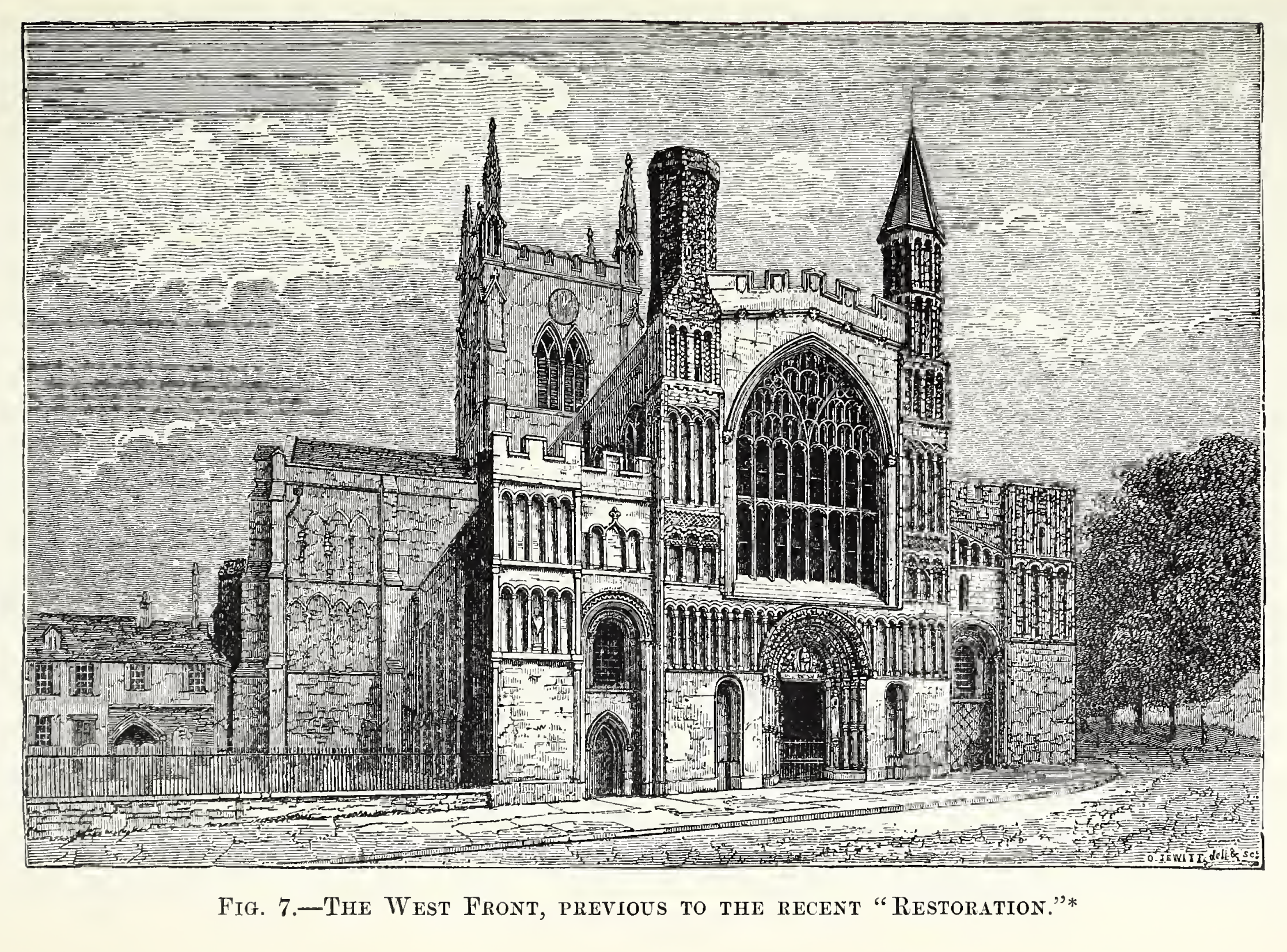
West front of Rochester Cathedral, before the recent "restoration"

Hope was born in Derby, the son of the Reverend William Hope, vicar of Saint Peter's Church. He was educated at Derby Grammar School and entered Peterhouse, Cambridge in 1877, graduating B.A. 1881, M.A. 1884, and Litt.D. 1912.

On leaving Cambridge, Hope became a master at Rochester Grammar School in Kent, a post he continued to hold until his appointment in 1885 as Assistant Secretary of the Society of Antiquaries. During this period he carried out the study of Rochester Cathedral Church and monastic buildings, which was published in Archaeologia Cantiana (1898).

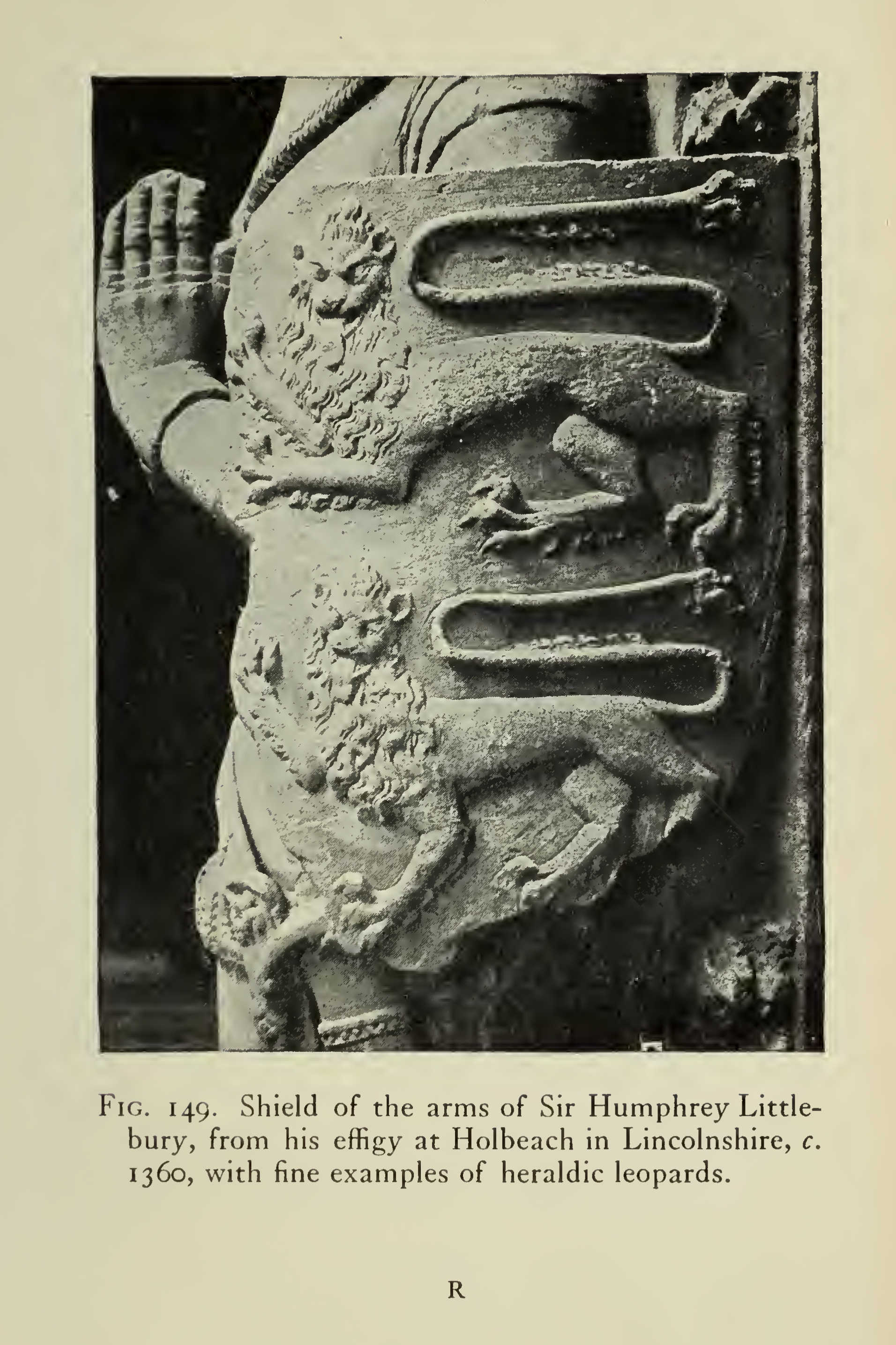
Shield of the arms of Sir Humphrey Littlebury, from his effigy at Holbeach in Lincolnshire. From Hope (1913)

Hope was interested in archaeology and heraldry since boyhood, and his earliest works were on the subject of the monumental brasses of English churches. His major work was his Architectural History of Windsor Castle, begun in 1893 with the approval of Queen Victoria, and completed twenty years later in 1913, an undertaking for which he was knighted. His other works include Stall-plates of Knights of the Garter, Heraldry for Craftsmen and Designers and A Grammar of English Heraldry.

He was involved in the Society of Antiquaries' report on the restorations and alterations at Bath by Charles Davis in the 1880s. His 1899 English Altars was the first publication of the Anglican traditionalist Alcuin Club. He assisted Sir Harold Brakspear in investigating Ludlow Castle in 1903 and in drawing the plans of Lewes Priory in 1906. He commissioned the Leeds Camera Club led by Godfrey Bingley to take photographs of Kirkstall Abbey for his book Architectural Description of Kirkstall Abbey, published in 1907, and undertook excavations there. Between 1909 and 1915, he participated in the first major excavation of the hillfort at Old Sarum, along with William Hawley and Duncan Montgomerie.

Hope married Myrrha Fullerton in 1885, and they had a son before her death in 1903. His second wife was Mary Jeffries, whom he married in 1910. He died at his home in Great Shelford near Cambridge, following a series of heart attacks.

== Selected publications ==
- Hope, W.H.St.John (1884). "The Architectural History of the Cluniac Priory of Saint Pancras at Lewes" (PDF). Archaeological Journal. 41: 1–34. doi:10.1080/00665983.1884.10852119.
- —— (1887). "On the English medieval drinking bowls called Mazers". Archaeologia. 50: 129–193. doi:10.1017/S0261340900005592.
- —— (1890). "On the sculptured alabaster tablets called Saint John's Heads". Archaeologia: 669–708.
- —— (1898). "The architectural history of the cathedral church and monastery of St. Andrew at Rochester. Part 1 - The cathedral church". Archaeologia Cantiana. 23: 194–328.
- —— (1900). "The architectural history of the cathedral church and monastery of St Andrew at Rochester. Part 2 - The monastery". Archaeologia Cantiana. 24: 1–85.
- —— (1901). The Stall Plates of the Knights of the Order of the Garter, 1348-1485. Westminster: Constable. A Series of Ninety Full-Sized Coloured Facsimiles with Descriptive Notes and Historical Introductions.
- —— (1904). "The imagery and sculptures on the west front of Wells Cathedral Church". Archaeologia. 59: 143–206. doi:10.1017/S026134090001153X. hdl:2027/gri.ark:/13960/t26b0w89b.
- ——; Brakspear, Harold (1906). "The Cistercian Abbey of Beaulieu, in the County of Southampton" (PDF). Archaeological Journal. 63: 129–186. doi:10.1080/00665983.1906.10853026.
- —— (1907). Architectural description of Kirkstall Abbey. Leeds: Thoresby Society.
- —— (1908). "The Castle of Ludlow" (PDF). Archaeologia. 61: 257–328. doi:10.1017/S0261340900009504.
- —— (1909). "Haughmond Abbey, Shropshire" (PDF). Archaeological Journal. 66: 281–310. doi:10.1080/00665983.1909.10853116.
- ——; Brakspear, Harold (1911). "Jervaulx Abbey". Yorkshire Archaeological Journal. 21: 303–344.
- —— (1913). Heraldry for craftsmen & designers. New York: Macmillan.
- —— (1913). Windsor castle; an architectural history. London: Country life.
