= John A. Dick =

American historical theologian

John "Jack" Alonzo Dick (born in Lawrence, Michigan in 1943) is a historical theologian, now retired from the KU Leuven. His areas of research, lecturing, and writing are religion and values in the United States, secularization, and religious fundamentalism.

== Education ==
Dick holds a BA with majors in philosophy and English literature from Sacred Heart Major Seminary; an MA in religious studies from the KU Leuven; a Licentiate of Sacred Theology in historical theology from the Catholic University of Nijmegen, (now the Radboud University Nijmegen); and a Ph.D. and a Doctorate of Sacred Theology in historical theology from the KU Leuven.

== Career ==
After defending his doctoral dissertation, magna cum laude, English Roman Catholic Reactions to the Maline Conversations in 1986, he was appointed Director of the Institute of Continuing Education at The American College, Catholic University of Leuven. From 1994 until 1998 he was Director of Academic Formation (Academic Dean).

He was appointed Director of The American College Center for the Study of Religion and Values in American Society in 1990.

He was Professor of Religion and Values in American Society in the inter-university (Catholic University of Leuven & University of Antwerp & University of Ghent) Master's Program in American Studies. (1991–2016)

In the 1993 – 1994 academic year, he became the third person to hold the chair for the Study of Religion and Values in American Society at the Catholic University of Leuven.

In 1996 he participated in "Inner Sabbath", a program co-sponsored by The American College of the KU Leuven and Sacred Heart University's Institute for Religious Education and Pastoral Studies, primarily intended for church professionals.

== Publications (selection) ==
- John A. Dick. The Malines Conversations Revisited. Leuven University Press, 1989. ISBN 9789061863175.
- David A. Boileau & John A. Dick, eds. Tradition and Renewal: Philosophical Essays Commemorating the Centennial of Louvain's Institute of Philosophy. (3 Volumes.) Leuven University Press, 1992. ISBN 9061865107; ISBN 9789061865100.
- A. Denaux & J.A. Dick. From Malines to ARCIC: The Malines Conversations Commemorated. Leuven: Leuven University Press, 1997. ISBN 9068319167; ISBN 978-9068319163
- Karim Schelkens, John A. Dick & Jürgen Mettepenningen. Aggiornamento? Catholicism from Gregory XVI to Benedict XVI. Leiden & Boston: Brill, 2013. ISBN 978-90-04-25411-4
- John Alonzo Dick. Jean Jadot: Paul's Man in Washington. Leuven: Another Voice Publications, 2021. ISBN 9798468950791

== Website ==
John Dick has a weekly theological blog For Another Voice — Reflections About Contemporary Christian Belief and Practice.
