= Kenneth Atchley =

American composer

- Born: 1954 (age 71–72)
- Origin: San Francisco Bay Area
- Genres: Noise, drone

Kenneth Atchley is an American composer, noise and drone musician, video artist, and member of the San Francisco Bay Area electronic music community.

== Career ==
Atchley uses temporary water fountains as sound-sources and uses analogue electronic instruments and laptops to create his works. Other important factors in his art include sculptures, and environmental and metaphorical elements. Atchley's music and live performances have been featured at various venues and festivals including The Kitchen, Bang on a Can, and the San Francisco Electronic Music Festival.

In September 1982, Atchley took part in a joint concert called the Rota-League Concert when the League of Automated Music Composers joined forces with an electronic-music band called The Rotary Club.

Atchley worked with choreographer Roseanne Spradlin in 2003 to create Rearrangement (or a Spell for Mortals) as a duet for Walter Dundervill and Athena Malloy. According to The New York Times, the piece "sounds like running water" and "the dancers explore issues of mortality in an appropriately enigmatic setting".

In winter 2006–2007, he composed a set of works for strings. The pieces, collectively titled 7 stillnesses, exploit a range of avant-garde harmonic progressions with emphasis on passages in which a chord is held long enough that its value within the harmonic progression disappears. The title refers not to a determinable number of "stillnesses"; more to the mythic use of number to refer to subjective experiences of stillness and quietude. The writing extends techniques that Atchley developed in his electronic work. In this composition the combined harmonics of an ensemble of string instruments create pared down, absorbing, tonal sound-planes.

In 2009, Atchley performed concert versions of turtle. The primary sound of this work is generated by six sine wave tones in the frequency range from 261.63 Hz and 440.00 Hz. Attending video landscapes are generated by defining and displaying sets of points within a single, germinal image.

Atchley has released several CDs of solo, electro-acoustic-noise works including fountains (published by Auscultare Research). He has also worked closely with other artists to create joint projects such as Sealed Cantus with John Bischoff (released on Bischoff's 23Five CD Aperture). He has also written an opera called Edison's Last Project(ION) and choral works including Lumiere de Main. The libretto and lyrics of these were published in the book Guests go in to Supper.

== Discography ==
- fountains Auscultare Research (2002)
- Vexing Shadows (2014)

== External sources ==
- Official website
- Golden, Barbara. “Conversation with Kenneth Atchley.” eContact! 12.2 — Interviews (2) (April 2010). Montréal: CEC.
