= Parish Communion movement =

Movement in the Church of England

The Parish Communion movement is a movement in the Church of England which aims to make Parish Communion on a Sunday the main act of worship in a parish.

The movement's aims are often summarised as "the Lord's people around the Lord's table on the Lord's day". The movement has been significant in that parish communion is now the usual act of Sunday worship in Church of England parishes.

Prior to this movement, the main act of parish collective worship on Sundays had been Morning Prayer or Evening Prayer or Evensong.

As the Book of Common Prayer states that it is only "binding on everybody to communicate three times a year", it was not the norm prior to the movement for the average layperson to receive holy communion every week. That said, the Prayer Book does envisage communion being celebrated every Sunday and on feast days.

Prior to the movement, the sacrament of Holy Communion was seen as an individual "making his communion" as a private act of devotion. Communion usually occurred on Sunday either at a Eucharist in the early morning (often around 8.00 am) or after the non-communicants had left the church or chapel following a late-morning (normally at 11.00 am) Morning Prayer. The movement is regarded as having changed the current Anglican practice such that a more collective service of Communion in the mid-morning is often central to a parish's Sunday worship. The practice of non-communicants leaving the church while communion is offered has also retreated.

== History ==
Early instances of weekly parish communion include W. H. Frere's services at St Faith's Stepney in the 1890s and Henry de Candole's services at St John's Newcastle in the late 1920s. The movement grew from the Liturgical Movement and originated in Anglo-Catholic circles.

Early advocates of parish communion included Cosmo Lang when Bishop of Stepney in the 1900s and by William Temple when Archbishop of York in the 1930s. However the movement could not be regarded as a movement until the collection of essays entitled The Parish Communion was published in 1937.

Even though the movement is held to have originated between the wars, it only lost its Anglo-Catholic connotations and started to gain popular momentum in the 1960s. The key proponent of parish communion was the "Parish and People movement", a group formed in 1949 to promote services of parish communion. It was key to the extent that the terms the "Parish and People movement" and the "Parish Communion movement" are used synonymously. The Parish and People movement has sometimes been conceived of as being representative of central churchmanship in that it was not low church in its views but not strictly speaking Anglo-Catholic either.

The movement could be regarded as having achieved its aims given that the National Evangelical Anglican Congress in the Keele statement of 1967, acknowledging that the church is moving in a new direction as a result of Anglo-Catholicism, the Liturgical Movement and the Parish Communion movement, stated its members planned to make a weekly celebration of Communion the main corporate act of worship in their parishes.
