= Walter Frere =

English Anglican bishop and liturgist

The Right Reverend Walter Frere CR
- Bishop of Truro
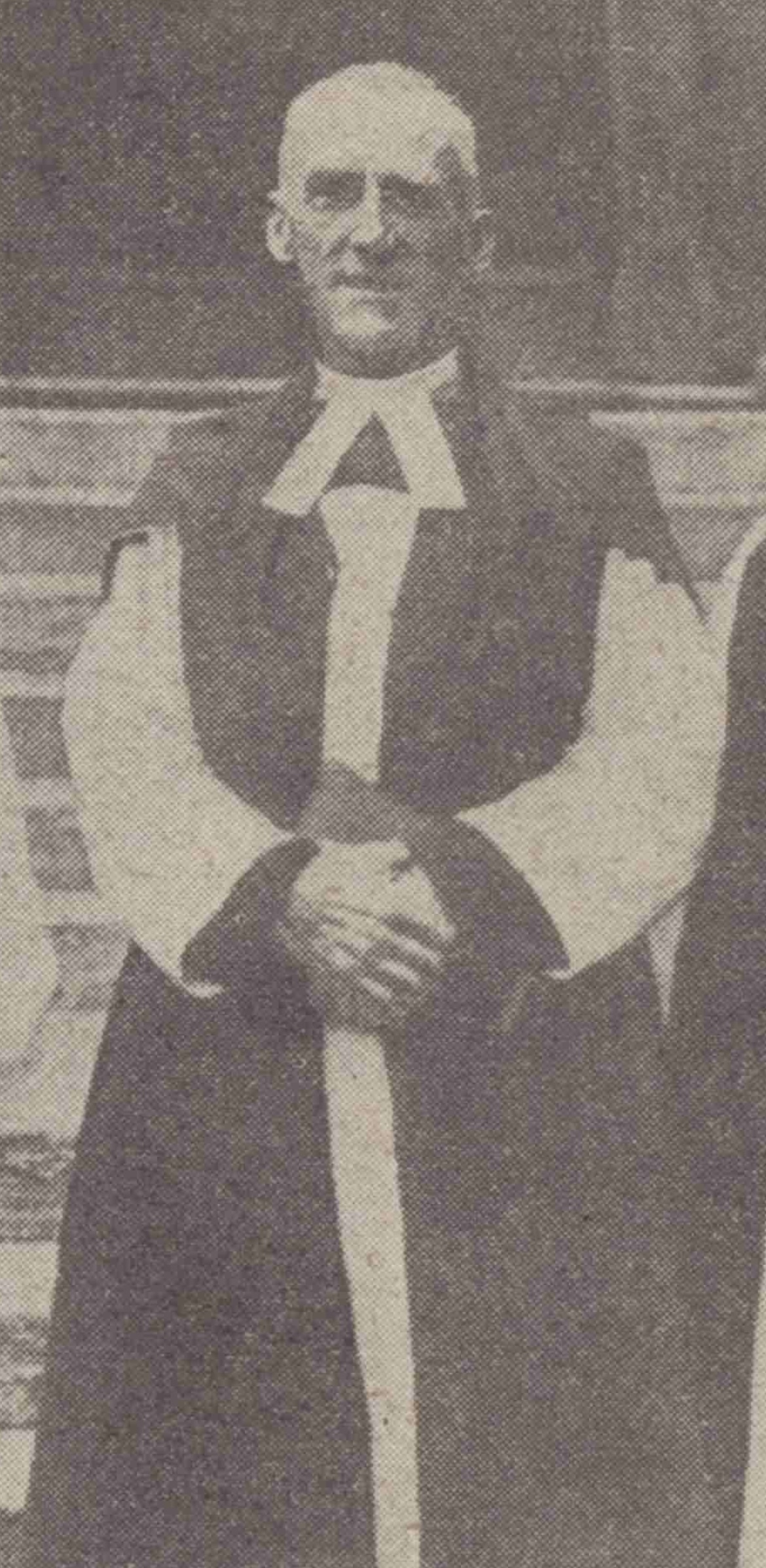
- Church: Church of England
- Province: Canterbury
- Diocese: Truro
- In office: 1923–1935
- Predecessor: Guy Warman
- Successor: Joseph Hunkin
- Other posts: Superior of the Community of the Resurrection (1902–1913 and 1916–1922)

Orders
- Ordination: 1889
- Consecration: 1 November 1923

Personal details
- Born: 23 November 1863 Cambridge, England
- Died: 2 April 1938 (aged 74) Mirfield, Yorkshire
- Buried: Mirfield, Yorkshire
- Denomination: Anglican
- Parents: Philip Howard Frere (father); Emily Gipps (mother)
- Education: Trinity College, Cambridge; Wells Theological College

Walter Howard Frere CR (23 November 1863 – 2 April 1938) was an English Anglican bishop and liturgist. He was a co-founder of the Anglican religious order the Community of the Resurrection, Mirfield, and Bishop of Truro (1923–1935).

== Biography ==
Frere was born in Cambridge, England, on 23 November 1863, the younger son of Philip Howard Frere and his wife Emily, née Gipps. His siblings were Arthur, Ellen and Lucy. Lucy became the wife of Wilfred J. Barnes. He was educated at Trinity College, Cambridge and Wells Theological College; and ordained in 1889. His first post was as a curate at St Dunstan's, Stepney, London, from 1887 to 1892. In 1892, he was one of the six priests who founded the Community of the Resurrection at Pusey House, Oxford; Charles Gore served as its first superior. He was also Examining Chaplain to the Bishop of Southwark from 1896 to 1909. He was twice Superior of the Community of the Resurrection: 1902 to 1913 and 1916 to 1922. He returned to the community after resigning the episcopal see in 1938.

In 1901, Frere revised and expanded Francis Procter's A History of the Book of Common Prayer (first published 1855). Known commonly as "Procter and Frere", the volume remained a standard history on the Book of Common Prayer for decades.

Frere was consecrated bishop at Westminster Abbey on 1 November 1923, by Randall Davidson, Archbishop of Canterbury. He regarded membership of a religious order an obligation taking precedence over others, the bishop's palace became a branch house of the Community.

Frere assisted the Indian Malankara Orthodox Church with the foundation of the Bethany religious order in 1919: however the dioceses forming this church were received into the Roman Catholic communion in 1930.

He was a member of the Anglican delegation to the Malines Conversations in the 1920s, and active in various other ecumenical projects including relations with the Russian Orthodox Church. He was a noted liturgical historical scholar; he was also a high churchman and a supporter of Catholic ideas. In his early writings and addresses he emphasised the importance of spiritual life, and explained some of the liturgical revision which was then in preparation.

He played a major part in the proposed revision of the Church of England Book of Common Prayer in 1928, which was later rejected by Parliament, and was responsible for the service book for the Guild of the Servants of the Sanctuary. Some of the books which belonged to Walter Frere form part of the Mirfield Collection which is housed in the University of York Special Collections.

He died on 2 April 1938 and was buried at Mirfield.

== Bibliography ==
- Recollections of Malines, 1935. Concerning discussions with Cardinal Mercier
- A Collection of his Papers on Liturgical and Historical Subjects, Alcuin Club, 1940.
- Correspondence on liturgical revision and construction, Alcuin Club, 1954.
- The Use of Sarum, 2 vols. 1898 and 1901.
- A New History of the Book of Common Prayer (based on F. Procter's earlier work), 1901.
- A Manual of Plainsong for Divine Service containing the Canticles Noted [and] the Psalter Noted to Gregorian Tones together with the Litany and Responses, edited by Frere and H. B. Briggs, Novello and Company, London, 1902.
- The Principles of Religious Ceremonial, 1906.
- York Service Books. York Minster Historical Tracts. Vol. 19. Society for Promoting Christian Knowledge. 1927.
- Black Letter Saints' Days, 1938. Providing eucharistic propers for a selection of saints in the interim 1928 Prayer Book Calendar.

Church of England titles
Preceded by Guy Warman	Bishop of Truro; 1923–1935	Succeeded by Joseph Hunkin
