= Frank Edward Brightman =

English scholar & liturgist (1856–1932)

Brightman in 1930.

Frank Edward Brightman, FBA (1856–1932) was an English scholar and liturgist.

== Career ==
Brightman was educated at Bristol Grammar school, and became a mathematical scholar at University College London in 1875. He took a first class in mathematical moderations in 1876, and subsequently second classes in classical moderations, humanities and theology, winning the senior Septuagint prize and the Denyer and Johnson scholarship. Following graduation, he was chaplain of University College, and later curate of St John the Divine, Kennington. From 1884 to 1903 he was a librarian of Pusey House, Oxford. In December 1902 he was elected a Fellow of Magdalen College, Oxford, as Theological Tutor. He was a strong high churchman, and a Prebendary of Lincoln Cathedral. From 1904 to 1932 he was editor of the Journal of Theological Studies.

J. R. R. Tolkien related a story how Brightman said that he once saw a dragon on the Mount of Olives, but that he "never before his death explained what he meant."

== Works ==
Principal works

- 1896 Liturgies, Eastern and Western; Vol. I: Eastern. This was a revised edition of the section on the Eastern churches in C. E. Hammond's 1878 book; it was based on extensive research and visits to monasteries in the East (vol. II was never published). Reprint 2004: ISBN 1-59333-118-5 〈〉 Edition on the WWW
- 1915 The English Rite: being a synopsis of the sources and revisions of the Book of Common Prayer , 2 vols. Oxford, 1915 (a laborious and valuable edition of the various editions of the Book of Common Prayer).

Selected articles

- "The Sacramentary of Serapion of Thmuis" in Journal of Theological Studies, i. and ii. (Oct. 1899, Jan. 1900)
- "Terms of communion and the ministration of the sacraments in early times". In: H. B. Swete (Hg.): Essays on the Early History of the Church. 2nd ed. London, 1921, pp. 313–408.
- "The New Prayer Book examined". In: The Church Quarterly Review; 104 (1927) pp. 219–252.

== Sources ==
- Cross, F. L., ed. (1957) The Oxford Dictionary of the Christian Church. London: Oxford University Press; pp. 198–99.
