= Alcuin Club =

Anglican organization for church ceremony

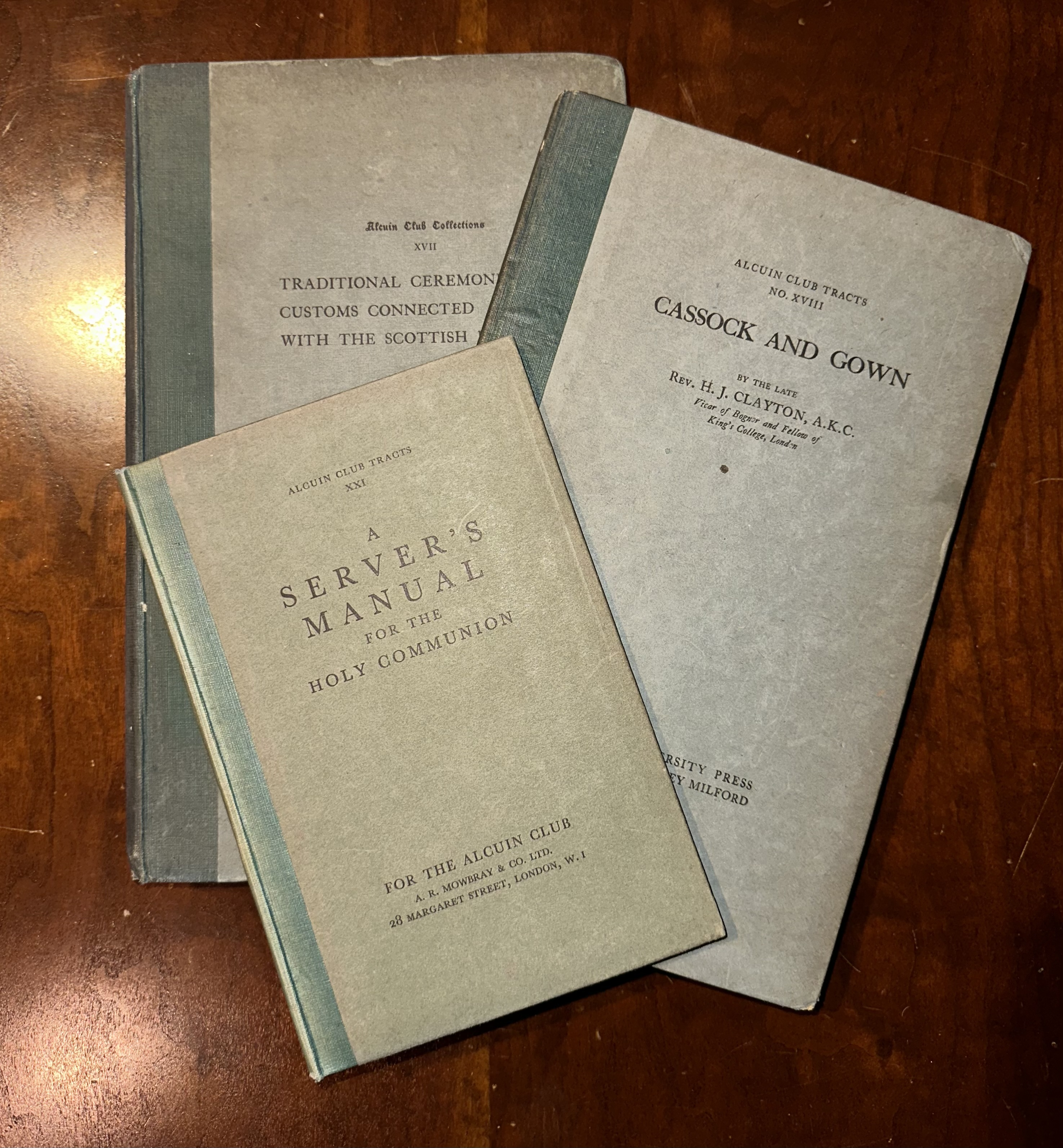
Three Alcuin Club books

The Alcuin Club is an Anglican organization seeking to preserve or restore church ceremony, arrangement, ornament, and practice in an orthodox manner.

The organization was founded in 1897 and named after Alcuin of York. It was a reorganization of an earlier group, the Society of St. Osmund, which was formed in 1889. The Alcuin Club's first publication, English Altars by W. H. St. John Hope, appeared in 1899. The club was especially dedicated to the Book of Common Prayer and conformity to its exact rubric. The club sought to provide academic and dispassionate vetting for proposed revisions to this Book. The club was active in the debate over the rewriting of the Book of Common Prayer in the 1920s.

The club's publications were read by ecclesiastical scholars, not a popular audience. In order to reach a broader audience, the Anglican priest Percy Dearmer and later faculty member of King’s College for sacred art, worked to spread the club's message. He sought to win artists and craftsmen with high aesthetic standards for liturgical work in churches and chapels.

Its influence faded after the 1950s and it is now dedicated to studying ceremony of all Christian churches. The club has members in the United Kingdom and many in the United States. Today, the Alcuin Club selects works on liturgy, ceremony, and hagiography for awards.

== Publications ==
From the beginnings, the club promoted bibliophile reprints. Its second publication, for instance, was Exposition de la messe from La legende dorée of Jean de Vignay, including illuminations reproduced from holdings in the Fitzwilliam Museum; these had little immediate connection to the Book of Common Prayer.

The club's occasional periodical is titled The Art of Worship.

Many Alcuin Club publications were published by the Society for Promoting Christian Knowledge.

== See also ==
- E. G. Cuthbert F. Atchley
- Edward C. Ratcliff
- Warham Guild
