= Liturgics =

Study of liturgy

Liturgics, also called liturgical studies or liturgiology, is the academic discipline dedicated to the study of liturgy (public worship rites, rituals, and practices). Liturgics scholars typically specialize in a single approach drawn from another scholarly field.

The most traditional sub-disciplines are:

Liturgical History
the study of the church history, texts, rituals, and practices of liturgy, as exemplified by scholars like Robert Taft and Paul Bradshaw.
Liturgical Theology
the theological examination of liturgy, including how worship shapes and is shaped by theological reflection, represented by figures such as Geoffrey Wainwright and Gordon Lathrop.
Ritual and Symbolic Analysis
an approach that interprets liturgy through ritual studies and symbolic analysis, associated with scholars like Mark Searle and Lawrence Hoffman.

More recently, two additional sub-disciplines have developed:

Pastoral Liturgics
Engages questions of presiding, liturgical leadership, congregational participation, and the formation of worshiping assemblies.
Cultural Studies
Examines liturgy in relation to cultural context, social location, and lived experience. Draws on anthropology, sociology, and cultural theory.

Although liturgics scholars using these approaches apply the principles of their respective disciplines to their research, all liturgics scholars focus their work in the ritual behaviors of the members of faith communities.

== See also ==
- High church
- Ritology
