= Prayer of Humble Access =

Christian prayer

The Prayer of Humble Access is the name traditionally given to a prayer originally from early Anglican Books of Common Prayer and contained in many Anglican, Methodist, Presbyterian, and other Christian eucharistic liturgies, including use by the personal ordinariates for former Anglican groups joining the Catholic Church. Its origins lie in the healing the centurion's servant as recounted in two of the Gospels. It is comparable to the "Domine, non sum dignus" used in the Catholic Mass.

== Origins ==
The prayer was an integral part of the early Books of Common Prayer of the Church of England and has continued to be used throughout much of the Anglican Communion. Its name is derived from the heading above the prayer in the Scottish Book of Common Prayer of 1637. This book was a moderate revision of the English Book of Common Prayer of that time, with influences and changes to concede to the Scottish Presbyterians. One change was the inclusion of the Prayer of Humble Access. The prayer finds its roots in a prayer of "worthy reception" which appeared in the Order for the Communion in 1548 and was retained in the 1549 Book of Common Prayer published during Edward VI's reign. The prayer was not apparently a translation of a pre-existing prayer found in the Sarum Rite; indeed, the Sarum Rite did not use the prayer "Domine, non sum dignus" at the communion, but a form of words peculiar to that rite. Rather, the Prayer of Humble Access as found in the Prayer Book was a unique combination of several sources, including phrases or concepts from Mark 7:28, the Liturgy of Saint Basil, a Gregorian collect, John 6:56, and the writings of Thomas Aquinas.

In its earliest appearance the prayer followed the confession and absolution and "comfortable words" which were inserted after the Roman Canon of the Mass. It remained there with the coming of the prayer book the next year.

In the 1552 prayer book, the prayer appears immediately after the proper preface and Sanctus of the eucharistic prayer. It retains this position in the 1662 prayer book. In subsequent revisions by various national churches, and in the proposed 1928 English BCP revision, the prayer was moved to after the Lord's Prayer and before the Agnus Dei, after which the consecrated elements are administered.

== Versions ==
The Prayer of Humble Access is based on two passages from the New Testament. One is Matthew 8:8; "The centurion replied, Lord, I do not deserve to have you come under my roof. But just say the word, and my servant will be healed." The other is found in Mark 7:28. It is a reply from a woman in speaking to Jesus regarding her unworthiness, who said, "but even the dogs under the table eat the children's crumbs".

The version of 1548 and 1549 appear below with modernised spelling:

We do not presume to come to this thy table (O merciful Lord) trusting in our own righteousness, but in thy manifold and great mercies: we be not worthy so much as to gather up the crumbs under thy table: but thou art the same Lord, whose property is always to have mercy: grant us therefore, gracious Lord, so to eat the flesh of thy dear Son Jesus Christ, and to drink his blood, [in these holy Mysteries,] that we may continually dwell in him, and he in us, that our sinful bodies may be made clean by his body, and our souls washed through his most precious blood. Amen.

In later versions, the bracketed words were deleted, and the last two clauses are rearranged. The 1552 revision (in the modernised spelling of the 1662 prayer book) reads as follows:

We do not presume to come to this thy Table, O merciful Lord, trusting in our own righteousness, but in thy manifold and great mercies. We are not worthy so much as to gather up the crumbs under thy Table. But thou art the same Lord, whose property is always to have mercy: Grant us therefore, gracious Lord, so to eat the flesh of thy dear Son Jesus Christ, and to drink his blood, that our sinful bodies may be made clean by his body, and our souls washed through his most precious blood, and that we may evermore dwell in him, and he in us. Amen.

The 1928 prayer book of the American Episcopal Church retains the 1662 wording. This same wording is used in Divine Worship: The Missal, promulgated in 2015 for Catholics in the personal ordinariates. Many contemporary Anglican liturgies, however, have revised it to varying degrees. The American 1979 prayer book and English Alternative Service Book (1980) versions may omit the phrase "that our sinful bodies may be made clean by his body, and our souls washed through his most precious blood". The phrase has been restored in the Common Worship version. Some Anglican eucharistic liturgies omit the prayer entirely. In the 1979 Prayer Book of the American Episcopal Church, the Prayer of Humble Access is an option after the fraction anthem in the (traditional language) Rite I service but not in the (contemporary language) Rite II service. A contemporary language rendition is found in the 2019 Prayer Book of the Anglican Church in North America.

The version of the prayer used in the Book of Common Worship (1993) of the Presbyterian Church (USA) uses contemporary English:

We do not presume to come to your table, merciful Lord, trusting in our own goodness, but in your all-embracing love and mercy. We are not worthy even to gather up the crumbs under your table, but it is your nature always to have mercy. So feed us with the body and blood of Jesus Christ, your Son, that we may forever live in him and he in us. Amen.

The version of the prayer used in the eucharistic liturgy of the Free Methodist Church is as follows:

We do not come to this Your table, O merciful Lord, with self-confidence and pride, trusting in our own righteousness, but we trust in Your great and many mercies. We are not worthy to gather the crumbs from under Your table. But You, O Lord, are unchanging in Your mercy and Your nature is love; grant us, therefore, God of mercy, God of grace, so to eat at this Your table that we may receive in spirit and in truth the body of Your dear Son, Jesus Christ, and the merits of His shed blood, so that we may live and grow in His likeness and, being washed and cleansed through His most precious blood, we may evermore live in Him and He in us. Amen.

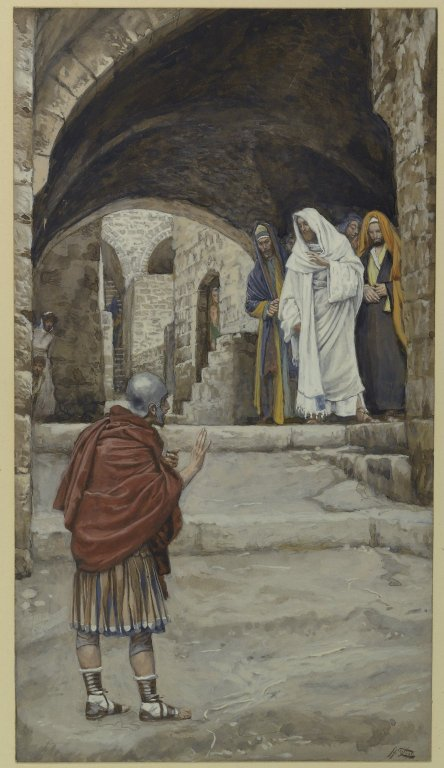
"Lord, I Am Not Worthy (Domine Non Sum Dignus)" (between 1886 and 1894) by James Tissot, Brooklyn Museum

== Domine, non sum dignus ==
There is some similarity with the prayer said immediately prior to communion in the Roman Rite Mass: Domine, non sum dignus, ut intres sub tectum meum: sed tantum dic verbo, et sanabitur anima mea which is translated: "“Lord, I am not worthy that you should enter under my roof, but only say the word and my soul shall be healed." Prior to the revisions made by the Second Vatican Council in the mid-1960s, the prayer was recited three times in Latin.

The 1662/1928 version of the prayer is used in Divine Worship: The Missal, the version of the Roman Rite Mass authorised for use by Roman Catholics in the personal ordinariates established under Pope Benedict XVI's Apostolic Constitution Anglicanorum coetibus. Both the Prayer of Humble Access and the Domine, non sum dignus are recited prior to the Communion of the Faithful.

William Byrd composed a six-voice motet for Domine, non sum dignus.

== Bibliography ==
- Anglican Church of Canada, Book of Alternative Services, Toronto: Anglican Book Centre, 1985.
- Hatchett, Marion J. "Prayer Books" in The Study of Anglicanism, ed. by Stephen Sykes and John Booty, London: SPCK, 1988.
- The First and Second Prayer Books of Edward VI, Everyman's Library, no. 448. London: J.M. Dent & Sons, 1910.
- Divine Worship: The Missal, Congregation for the Doctrine of the Faith, London: Catholic Truth Society, 2015
