= Book of Common Prayer (1662) =

Anglican liturgical book

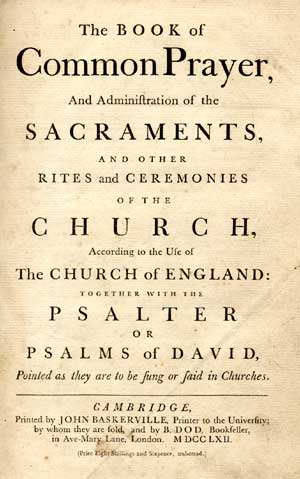
Cover page to the 1662 Book of Common Prayer, as printed by John Baskerville for Cambridge in 1762

The 1662 Book of Common Prayer (Note: The full title of the 1662 prayer book is The Book of Common Prayer and Administration of the Sacraments and Other Rites and Ceremonies of the Church, According to the Use of the Church of England, Together with the Psalter or Psalms of David, Pointed as They Are to be Sung or Said in Churches: And the Form and Manner of Making, Ordaining, and Consecrating of Bishops, Priests, and Deacons. While it is often referred to as the "1662 prayer book", there are instances when the text is described by its year of revision, 1661. On other occasions, it has been called the Caroline prayer book, referencing its production under Charles II.) is an authorised liturgical book of the Church of England and other Anglican bodies around the world. In continuous print and regular use for over 360 years, the 1662 prayer book is the basis for numerous other editions of the Book of Common Prayer and other liturgical texts. Noted for both its devotional and literary quality, the 1662 prayer book has influenced the English language, with its use alongside the King James Version of the Bible contributing to an increase in literacy from the 16th to the 20th century.

Within Christian liturgy, the 1662 prayer book has had a profound impact on spirituality and ritual. Its contents have inspired or been adapted by many Christian movements spanning multiple traditions both within and outside the Anglican Communion, including Anglo-Catholicism, Methodism, Western Rite Orthodoxy, and Unitarianism. Due to its dated language and lack of specific offices for modern life, the 1662 prayer book has largely been supplanted for public liturgies within the Church of England by Common Worship. Nevertheless, it remains a foundational liturgical text of that church and much of Anglicanism.

== Background ==
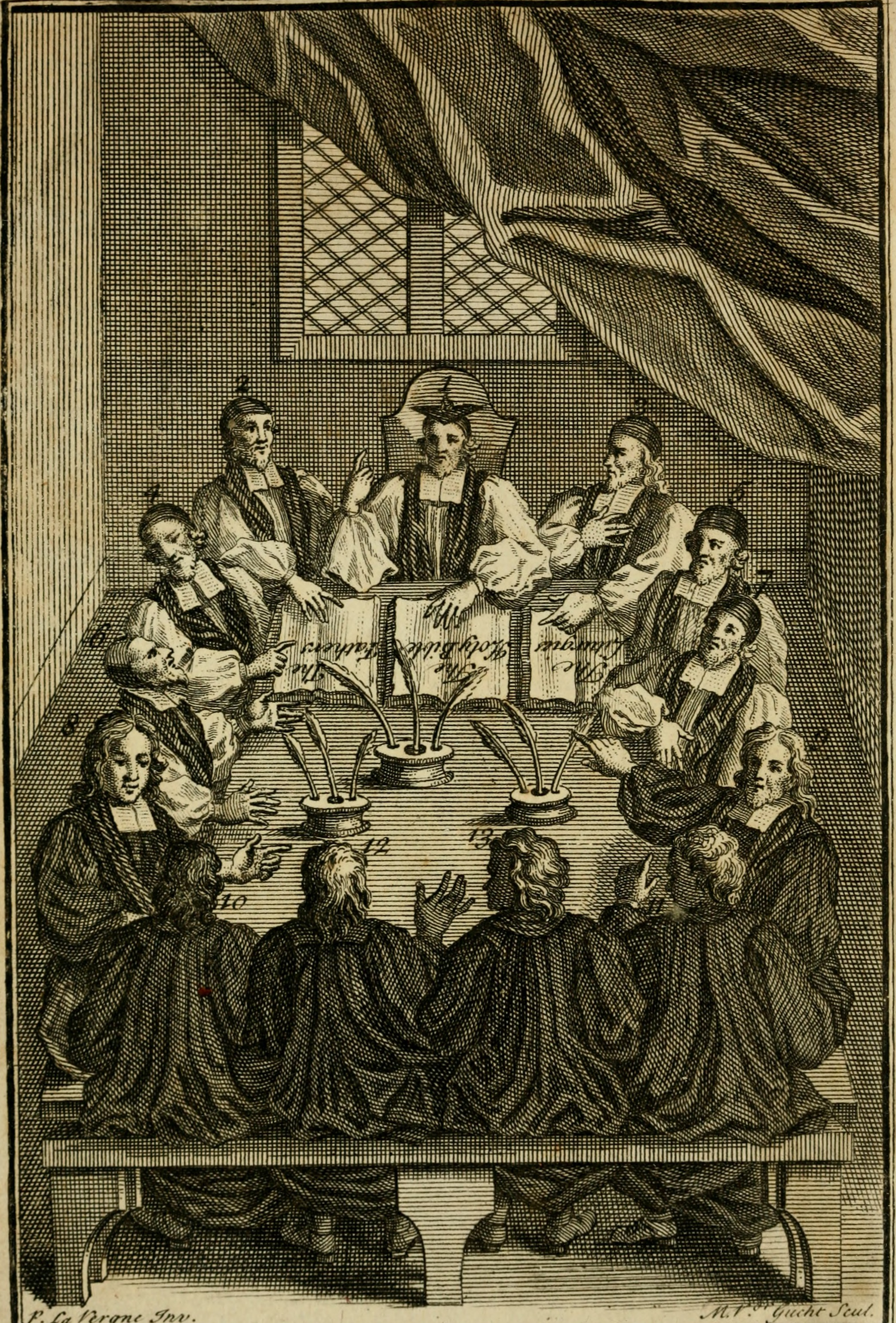
Compilers of the first Book of Common Prayer, including Cranmer

Following the English Reformation and the separation of the Church of England from the Catholic Church, the liturgies of Anglicanism were transcribed into English. The 1549 Book of Common Prayer, traditionally considered to be the work of Thomas Cranmer, replaced both the missals and breviaries of Catholic usage. Largely a translation of the Sarum Use books, the liturgies were the Communion service and canonical hours of Matins and Evensong, with the addition of the first Edwardine Ordinal containing the forms for the ordination of bishops, priests, and deacons in 1550.

Under Edward VI, the 1552 Book of Common Prayer was a radically Protestant liturgy, greater Reformed theology. This process continued with the 1559 edition, following Elizabeth I's rejection of the Marian Restoration. The 1559 edition was for some time the second-most diffuse book in England, only behind the Bible, through an act of Parliament that mandated its presence in each parish church across the country.

The usage of the 1559 prayer book and subsequent elaboration at the Convocation of 1563, which produced the Thirty-nine Articles of Religion and the revised Book of Homilies in 1571, helped solidify Anglicanism as doctrinally distinct from Catholicism and more Reformed churches under what is now known as the Elizabethan Religious Settlement. Minor alterations to the 1559 prayer book were made in 1561, with additions to the Kalendar.

=== Puritan opposition and the Commonwealth ===
Puritans rejected substantial portions of the Book of Common Prayer, particularly elements retained from pre-Reformation usage. Further escalating the tension between Puritans and other factions in the Church of England were efforts, such as those by Matthew Parker, Archbishop of Canterbury, to require the usage of certain vestments such as the surplice and cope. The Puritan faction further established their opposition to the prayer book liturgical formulae by the Millenary Petition in 1603 and at the Hampton Court Conference in 1604. The resulting Jacobean prayer book was only a minor revision, but the conference also approved the development of the Authorized Version of the Bible. Among the more notable alterations in the Jacobean prayer book was an elongation of the Catechism's sacramental teachings and the introduction of a rubric allowing only a "lawful minister" to perform baptisms, which has been described as an example of post-Reformation clericalism.

Jenny Geddes rejects Laud's prayer book in St. Giles' Cathedral, Edinburgh, 23 July 1637.

The Puritan, Presbyterian, and eventually Parliamentarian opposition to the prayer book continued, while the prayer book was a sign of Royalist leanings. The imposition of a 1637 prayer book influenced by William Laud, the high church Archbishop of Canterbury, for the Church of Scotland stirred a riot that eventually spiraled into the First Bishops' War. The popular Puritan Root and Branch petition, presented to the Long Parliament by Oliver Cromwell and Henry Vane the Younger in 1640, attempted to eliminate the episcopacy and decried the prayer book as "Romish".

With the defeat of the Royalist Cavalier faction, execution of Charles I, and establishment of Commonwealth England under the Puritan Parliament, restrictions were repeatedly imposed on prayer book worship that culminated in its prohibition in 1645 and introduction of the Directory for Public Worship. Public celebration according to prayer book rubrics occasionally continued with varying degrees of discreetness, with priests such as George Bull and John Hacket memorising certain offices to feign extemporaneous prayer. Private celebration of the prayer book among some laity continued, with John Evelyn recording in his diary the conduct of private baptisms of his children and the churching of his wife according to the prayer book. Other proponents of the prayer book, including Laud, were imprisoned. Laud was executed in 1645.

== Revision and introduction ==
=== Restoration and Savoy Conference ===
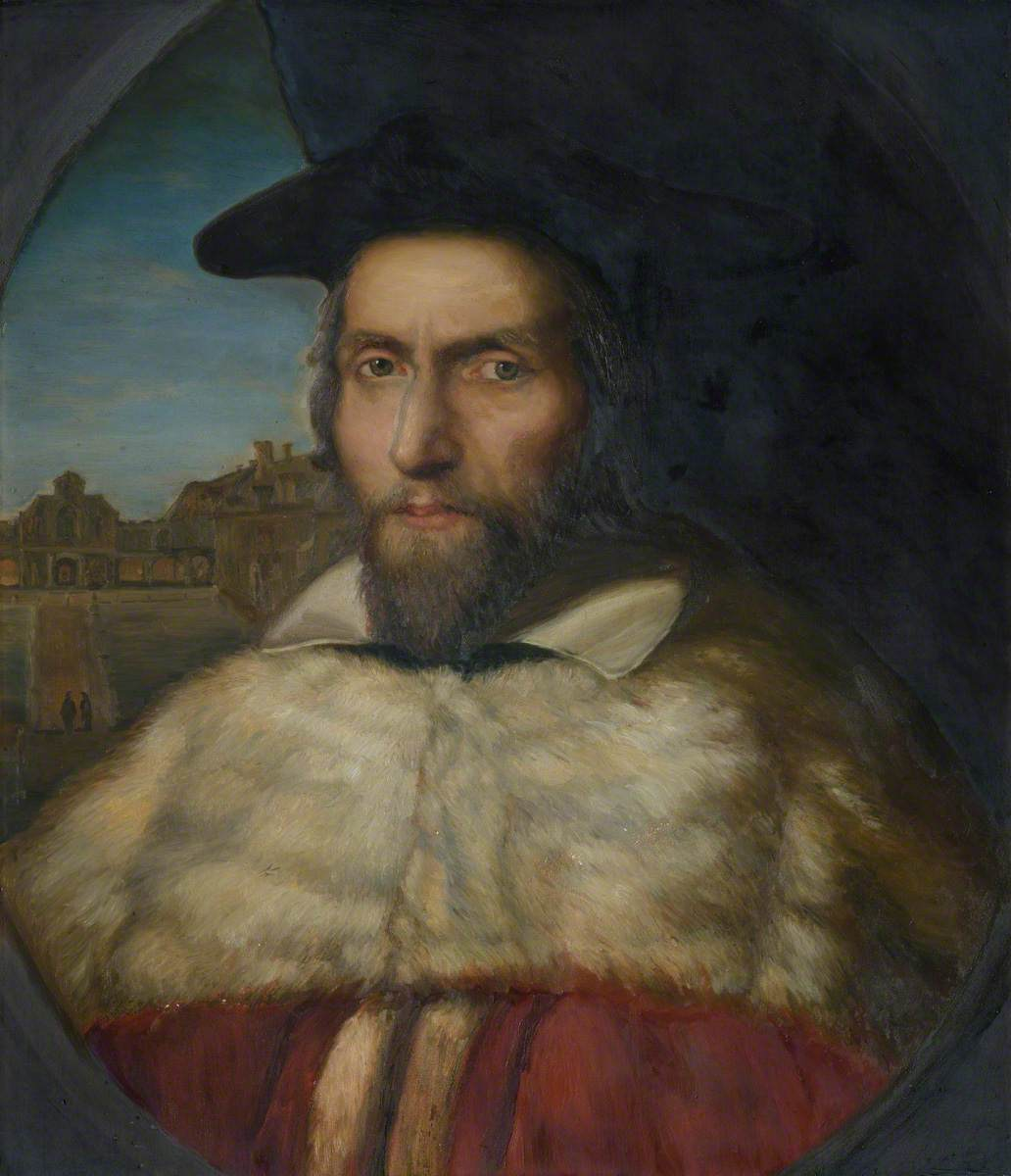
John Cosin, prominent Laudian during the Savoy Conference and notator of the Durham Book

Matthew Wren, a Laudian bishop locked in the Tower of London by the Parliamentarian Roundheads, remarked during his imprisonment that the prayer book "hath been long disused that not one of five hundred" were familiar enough with the prayer book that they would recognise any alterations. Despite this, Wren hoped that he could effect a revision that would resolve the issues that had made the prayer book so unpopular. This desire for effective revision was contemporaneous with a significant increase of interest in Anglican liturgical history; Hamon L'Estrange's 1659 The alliance of divine offices would be the only comparative study of the preceding prayer books for some time even following the 1662 edition's approval.

The 1660 Stuart Restoration saw the end of Puritan rule and coronation of Charles II. While the reinstated Church of English prelates desired a return to prayer book liturgies, the surviving Nonconformist Puritan party sought an arrangement that would prevent the resurrection of the prayer book and other pre-Commonwealth Anglican practices. The new leadership broadly supported simply reinstating the 1604 prayer book, but both Laudians and Presbyterians successfully lobbied for revision. This dialogue culminated in the 1661 Savoy Conference at Savoy Hospital in London. From among the Anglican bishops and Puritan ministers, twelve representatives and nine assistants attended the conference. The Anglican party forwarded a modest revision of the 1559 prayer book, advertised as a via media between Catholic and Reformed Protestant practice. The conference terminated with few concessions to the Puritans, which included rejecting an effort to delete the wedding ring from the marriage office, and encouraged the creation of a new prayer book. (Note: The liturgy presented by the Puritan party at the Savoy Conference was a liturgy derived from John Calvin's liturgies and John Knox's Book of Common Order amended and printed by Robert Waldegrave, published under the title A Booke of the Forme of Common Prayers, Administration of the Sacraments, etc., agreeable to God's Worde and the use of the Reformed Churches.)

The Laudian ritualist John Cosin had fled during the Commonwealth and was made Bishop of Durham upon his return in 1660. Cosin, who had spent his exile examining the prayer book liturgy, produced a compilation of his proposed revisions as notations in a 1619 copy of the prayer book. The edits and notes of this copy, known as the Durham Book, were translated by William Sancroft into a new copy, known as the Fair Copy. Ultimately, some of these edits were accepted by the Convocation and placed into a manuscript, known as the Annex Book for its attachment as an annex to the law approving it, and a noted 1636 copy of the prayer book, known as the Convocation Book.

The post-Puritan Parliament passed a series of four laws, known as the Clarendon Code, to prevent Puritans and other Nonconformists from holding office and ensure that public worship was according to officially approved Anglican texts. The Act of Uniformity 1662, passed on 19 May 1662, authorised the usage of the 1559 prayer book until St. Bartholomew Day that year, at which point it would be replaced with the 1662 prayer book. When the 24 August date arrived, an estimated 1,200 to 2,000 Puritans were evicted from their benefices in what became known as the Great Ejection or Black Bartholomew. In 1664, the Conventicle Act introduced punishments for any person over 16 years old should they attend a worship service not according to the 1662 prayer book. These Nonconformists would boost the Dissenter denominations, frustrating the Church of England's efforts for uniform worship.

=== Early printings ===
Including printings of the 1549, 1552, 1559, and 1662 editions, there were more than 500 printings of the Book of Common Prayer through to the 1730s, with an average of 2,500 to 3,000 copies in these printings. The total number of copies printed increased as technology improved; in the period between 1836 and 1846, up to half a million copies of the 1662 prayer book were printed each year. It was during the first decades of the 1662 edition's use that Oxford University Press began printing an increasingly larger proportion of the total number of prayer books produced.

Some initial printings retained the already antique blackletter script of earlier editions, though the last blackletter English prayer book of any note may have been the 1662 prayer book's first folio edition. (Note: This same first folio edition, printed under the crown copyright granted to John Bill and Christopher Barker, featured an elaborate engraved title page by David Loggan.) The 1662 prayer book was among the various texts printed by John Baskerville in his font during the 18th century. Baskerville, whose printings achieved acclaim for their ornamentation, also collaborated with Cambridge University Press to produce octavo and duodecimo prayer books. Deviating from the red and Gothic script used in Roman Breviaries and earlier prayer books respectively, roman fonts were standard for 1662 prayer book rubrics.

== Church of England usage ==
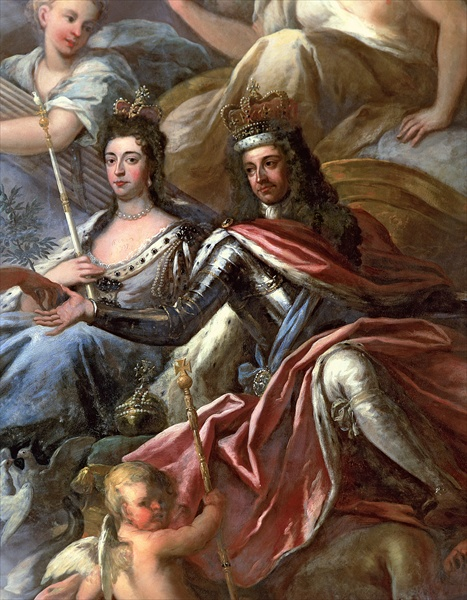
King William III and Queen Mary II, the Calvinist monarchs who replaced James II during the Glorious Revolution

For roughly 300 years, the 1662 prayer book was left mostly unmodified. However, incremental additions appeared during the early Stuart Restoration. Among them were polemic penitential offices for the Gunpowder Plot and execution of Charles I, as well as one for thanksgiving following the 1666 Great Fire of London. (Note: "A Form of Prayer, to be used yearly on the second of September for the Dreadful Fire of London" appeared in some Oxford printings between 1681 and 1683 and in the Thomas Parsell Latin translation. Archbishop Thomas Tenison ordered a revision of the service in 1696. Versions of the service appeared in printings until 1821 and celebrations of the office persisted at St Paul's Cathedral until 1859.) Soon into its use, the 1662 prayer book's lack of offices for particular events forced the Church of England to separately adopt forms for these services. Among these was a simplified form for consecrating churches approved by convocation in 1712, the result of Cosin's Laudian office having been rejected and the need to consecrate 50 new churches in London. When James II of England succeeded Charles II, it was necessary to revive the coronation service used by Elizabeth, James I, and Charles I.

Where Charles II had been Catholic-sympathising, James II was an openly practising Catholic. Both favoured practices which further excluded Nonconformists. The ousting of James II and arrival of the Dutch Calvinist William III and Mary II during the Glorious Revolution in 1688 resulted in a greater normalisation of relations with Dissenter parties. Along with these measures, William III endorsed the creation of a commission to improve the Church of England's relations with Nonconformists. One objective of the commission was to approve "alterations and amendments to the liturgy" along Latitudinarian lines. With the leadership of William Lloyd, then the Bishop of Worcester, and deans Edward Stillingfleet, Simon Patrick, and John Tillotson (the latter becoming the Archbishop of Canterbury), a revised prayer book was produced in 1689. The Liturgy of Comprehension was never approved, as the policy of Toleration towards Nonconformists—codified by the 1688 Toleration Act—was felt sufficient. The contents of the Liturgy of Comprehension were not public until Parliament ordered its printing in 1854.

Efforts to revise the prayer book were proliferate through the 19th century. Pamphlets containing proposals for such revisions were published in the dozens during the 1850s and 1860s, though to no formalised effect. Similarly, internal Church of England efforts to alter the prayer book resulted in only the excising of the Gunpowder Plot prayers and insertion of a general office to celebrate the accession day of the reigning monarch. An 1877 committee spent 15 years attempting to improve the 1662 prayer book's punctuation, ultimately with no action taken.

== Imperial usage and translations ==
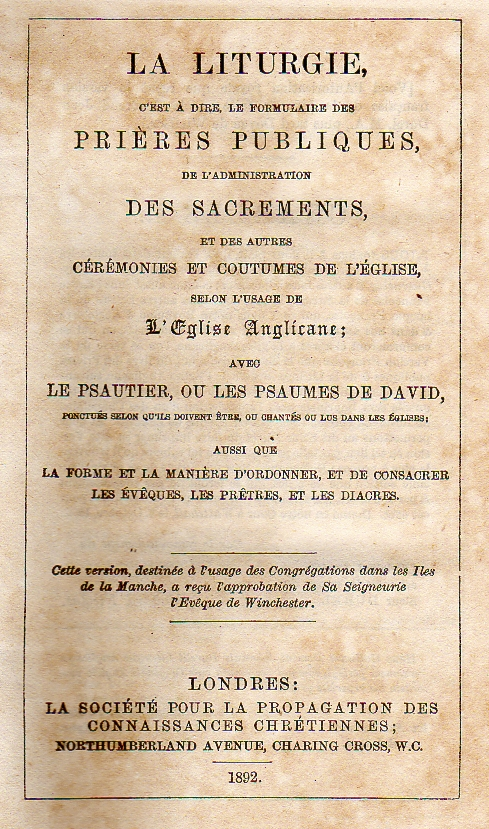
An 1892 Society for Promoting Christian Knowledge printing of the 1662 prayer book in French. The John Durel French translation was used by Guernésiais speakers into the 20th century.

As the British Empire continued its growth beyond the British Isles, the 1662 prayer book was consoling those migrating abroad. For those travelling on long voyages aboard ships, the prayer book made pastoral provisions with the Forms of Prayer to be used at Sea. The 1662 prayer book was also produced with an awareness of its future use these territories beyond England, both as a pastoral and missionary text: a form of baptism for adults was introduced in part to address the increase of "baptism of natives in our plantations", as described by the 1662 prayer book's preface.

For mostly academic reasons, the 1549 prayer book had been translated into Latin; there was some usage among Irish priests who knew only Gaelic and Latin. Such Latin translations continued with the 1662 prayer book, with multiple revisions and the introduction of a Greek translation.

More practical translations were born of the prayer book's vernacular tradition, further elaborated on and defended by the Thirty-Nine Articles, which came to be seen as broad endorsement of translation and inculturation. The first Spanish-language edition was a 1604 translation of the Jacobean prayer book from a Latin edition, executed by former-Dominican Fernando de Texada. The first published translation of the 1662 prayer book, sans ordinal, was in 1707 in an edition translated by Don Felix Anthony de Alvarado, a London minister to Spanish merchants. The 1715 edition that included an ordinal in Latin and a preface calling on Spaniards to worship with vernacular, leading the volume to be included on the Catholic list of prohibited texts. A further translation was published in 1821.

In North America, the 1662 prayer book was translated into several Native American languages. The first was Mohawk in 1715, followed by Algonquian languages in British colonial Canada and the Thirteen Colonies, often locally led and supported by printings from the Society for Promoting Christian Knowledge. Edmund Peck, a Church Missionary Society missionary to the Inuit, was the first to translate the prayer book into Inuktitut (then known as Eskimo) in 1881. Further translations of the 1662 prayer book and later Canadian editions have been subsequently published.

Several different translations of the Anglican liturgies into multiple Chinese languages were undertaken through the 19th century by English, Canadian, and American missionaries. These translations were used in the production of a prayer book for the Holy Catholic Church of China, a union of Anglican missionary jurisdictions that operated from 1912 until the 1949 victory of the Chinese Communist Party in the Chinese Civil War. Ultimately, in 1957 the Hong Kong Sheng Kung Hui introduced a prayer book derived from the 1662 and 1928 proposed prayer books.

== Later revision, supplementation, and replacement ==
=== Proposed 1928 revision ===
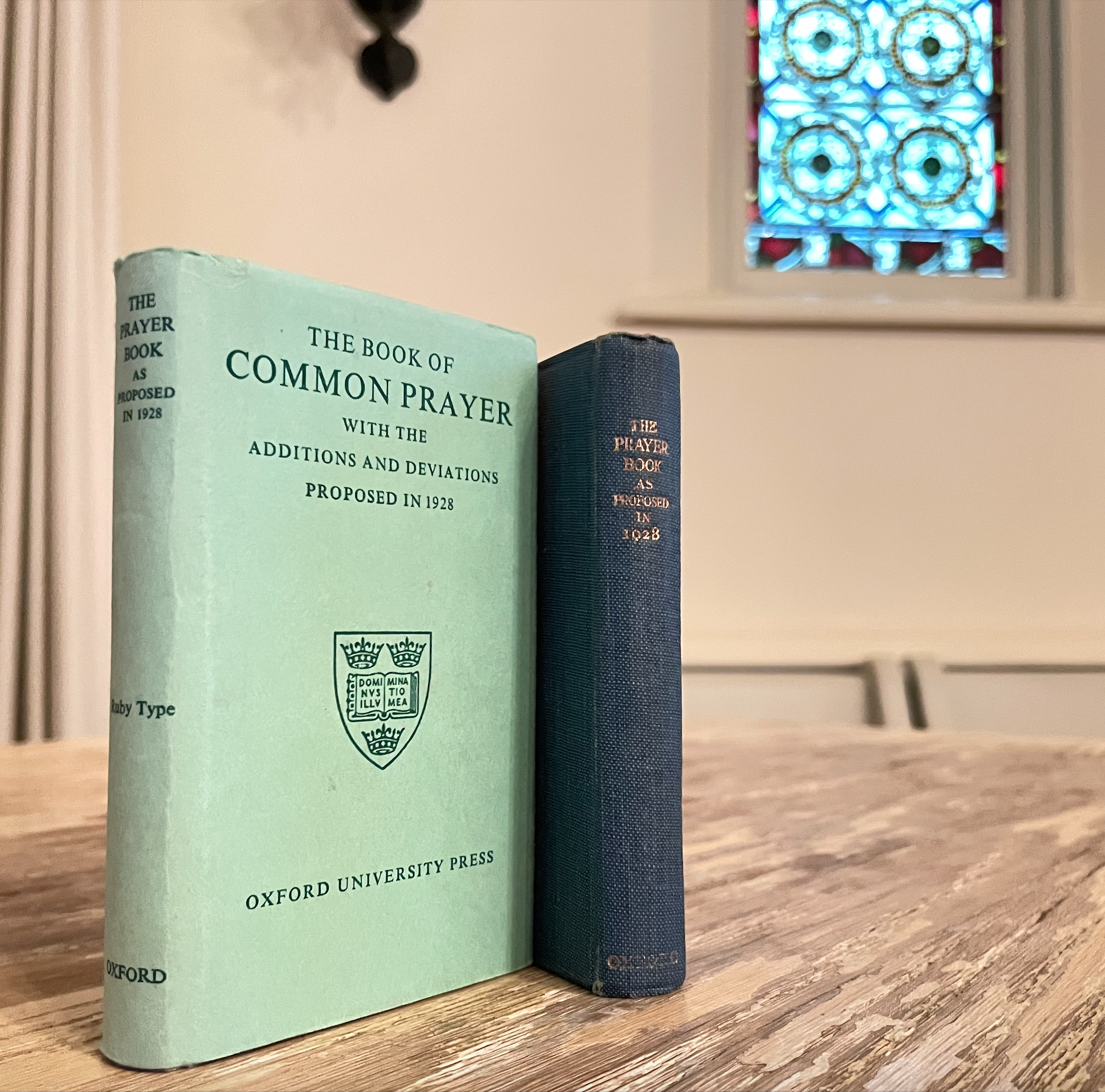
Two printings of the proposed 1928 prayer book

The influences of the Oxford Movement, a ritualist and Anglo-Catholic movement launched by a series of tracts first published in 1833, continued after the First World War, and the immediate Interwar period drew a desire to revise the 1662 prayer book in accord with social changes. Anglo-Catholics in particular had been agitating for revision even prior to the war. In 1906, a group of five Church of England bishops led by John Wordsworth, the Bishop of Salisbury, and aided by liturgical scholar Walter Frere, met to discuss which ornaments and vestments were permitted by the 1662 prayer book's rubrics. Their publicly published 1908 consensus was that the chasuble was permitted, drawing ire that saw the Upper House of Convocation approving a less affirmative resolution in 1911. Also in 1911, Frere published Some Principles of Liturgical Reform. This text prompted Randall Davidson, Archbishop of Canterbury, to approve an advisory committee to discuss revision.

An assemblage composed of members of both the Anglo-Catholic and Evangelical parties first met in 1912. During the war years, some of the practices that Anglo-Catholics sought, such as reserving the Eucharist, were permitted to the suspicion of the Evangelical wing. With the experience in the war, many clergy reported an increased need for revision. These efforts first culminated in NA 84 in February 1923, which most closely followed Anglo-Catholic desires and moved away from the 1662 edition. (Note: NA 84 shares the same title as the 1662 prayer book. Twenty copies were printed by Oxford University Press. It features a disclaimer that reads "Draft Revision: corrected February 1923 in accordance with N.A. 84.") The publishing of NA 84 prompted three separate unofficial proposals in 1923 and 1924. The staunchly traditionalist Anglo-Catholic English Church Union (E.C.U.) published their own proposal, the "Green Book", in 1923 in accordance to their internal revision process's 1922 conclusions which deleted many non-liturgical elements of the 1662 prayer book which they determined to be anachronistic. More limited revisions were prepared by more Liberal Anglo-Catholics under William Temple in the 1923 "Grey Book" and moderate Anglo-Catholics of the Alcuin Club in the 1923 and 1924 "Orange Books". (Note: All texts produced by the three groups were referred to by the colour of their covers, though carried their own titles or title pages. While deviating in content from each other and NA 84, each approved reservation of the Eucharist.) Alongside these efforts, Evangelicals increasingly disapproved of revision entirely.

Revision continued until 1927 producing the "Green Book" of the Church of England's National Assembly. Proponents of the proposed prayer book noted that it would only serve as an alternative to the 1662 edition, rather than succeeding it entirely, as had occurred elsewhere. This text was submitted to the House of Commons as required by law, where it was defeated in December 1927 after a coalition of conservative Church of England loyalists and Nonconformists failed to override both opposition and Catholic parliamentarian abstention. Among those in favour of approval had been Winston Churchill, who affirmed the Church of England's Protestant orthodoxy, while opponents viewed the proposed text as too permissive of "indiscipline and Romanism". A second effort, with some minor modifications, similarly failed in 1928. Subsequent usage of the text, while not approved, resulted in later printings. (Note: Printing rights to the 1928 proposed prayer book, like the 1662 prayer book, were owned by Eyre & Spottiswoode, Cambridge University Press, and Oxford University Press. It is presently printed by Canterbury Press of Norwich. Each copy carries a preface describing the failure for the text to attain approval and a disclaimer that reads: "The publication of this Book does not directly or indirectly imply that it can be regarded as authorized for use in churches.")

=== Alternative Service Book and Common Worship ===
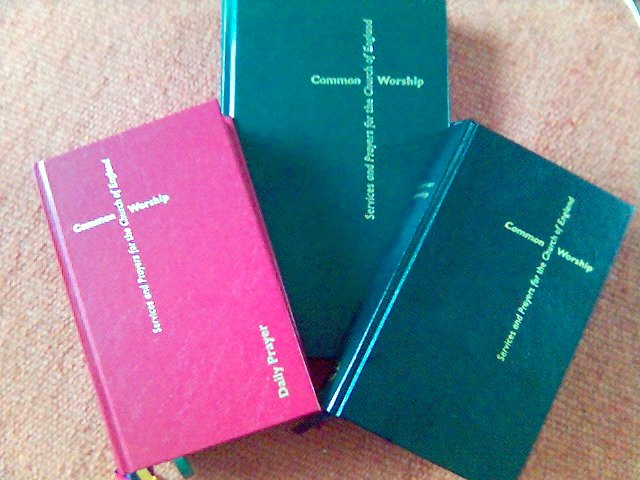
Copies of three of the Common Worship series containing texts for individual offices

Following the failure of the 1928 text, the next decades were featured a wide assortment of new conceptualisations what liturgies should look like and accomplish. This breadth of ideas was largely the result of the Liturgical Movement. Church of England liturgists such as A. G. Hebert pushed for "renewal" of parochial liturgies during the Interwar period, with their ideas remaining popular into the 1960s. Post-Second World War Anglicans from both Anglo-Catholic and Evangelical strains sought liturgical reforms, including prayer book revision.

Ultimately, an incremental addition of alternative liturgies was adopted. This may have been an effort to circumvent the process that would be required to outright replace the 1662 prayer book, the same process that caused the rejection of the 1927 and 1928 proposals; The Church of England passed the Alternative and Other Services Measure in 1965 to authorise these alternative liturgies. The first, Alternative Services Series 1, was published in 1966 and was largely similar to the 1928 proposed text. Series 2 contained traditional prayer book language but had new orderings for rites. Series 3 was the first set to use modernised language. Up to that point, these alternatives had been printed in booklets, but in 1974 the publication of fully-bound pew books was authorised through the Worship and Doctrine Measure. This same measure also permanently enabled the church to produce alternative liturgies, contingent on the church permanently protecting the 1662 prayer book. In 1980, the Alternative Service Book was published. The acceptance of these new rites saw several failed attempts in the House of Lords to limit the alternative texts, including requirements that parishes offer a certain proportion of their liturgies according to the 1662 prayer book.

The lectionary was a matter of contestation; the Church of England opted against the post-Vatican II, three-year Roman Sunday lectionary despite its otherwise ecumenical reception, and instead approved a two-year lectionary in the later 1960s. This two-year cycle was reflected in the Alternative Service Book; the new daily Roman lectionary was also approved for use in the Alternative Service Book. Ultimately, a modified form of the Roman Sunday lectionary, the three-year Revised Common Lectionary, was approved by the Church of England.

In 2000, a new compilation of the Church of England's approved liturgies was published as Common Worship. However, due to the variety of alternatives for various offices, the text is often printed not containing each liturgy but only those relevant to the preferences and needs of various congregations. Among the approved offices in Common Worship is the 1662 Communion office, considered an alternative in the text. The favouring of Common Worship and decline in parishes using the 1662 prayer book has led groups such as the Prayer Book Society to sponsor the 1662 edition's usage, with some success.

== Contents ==
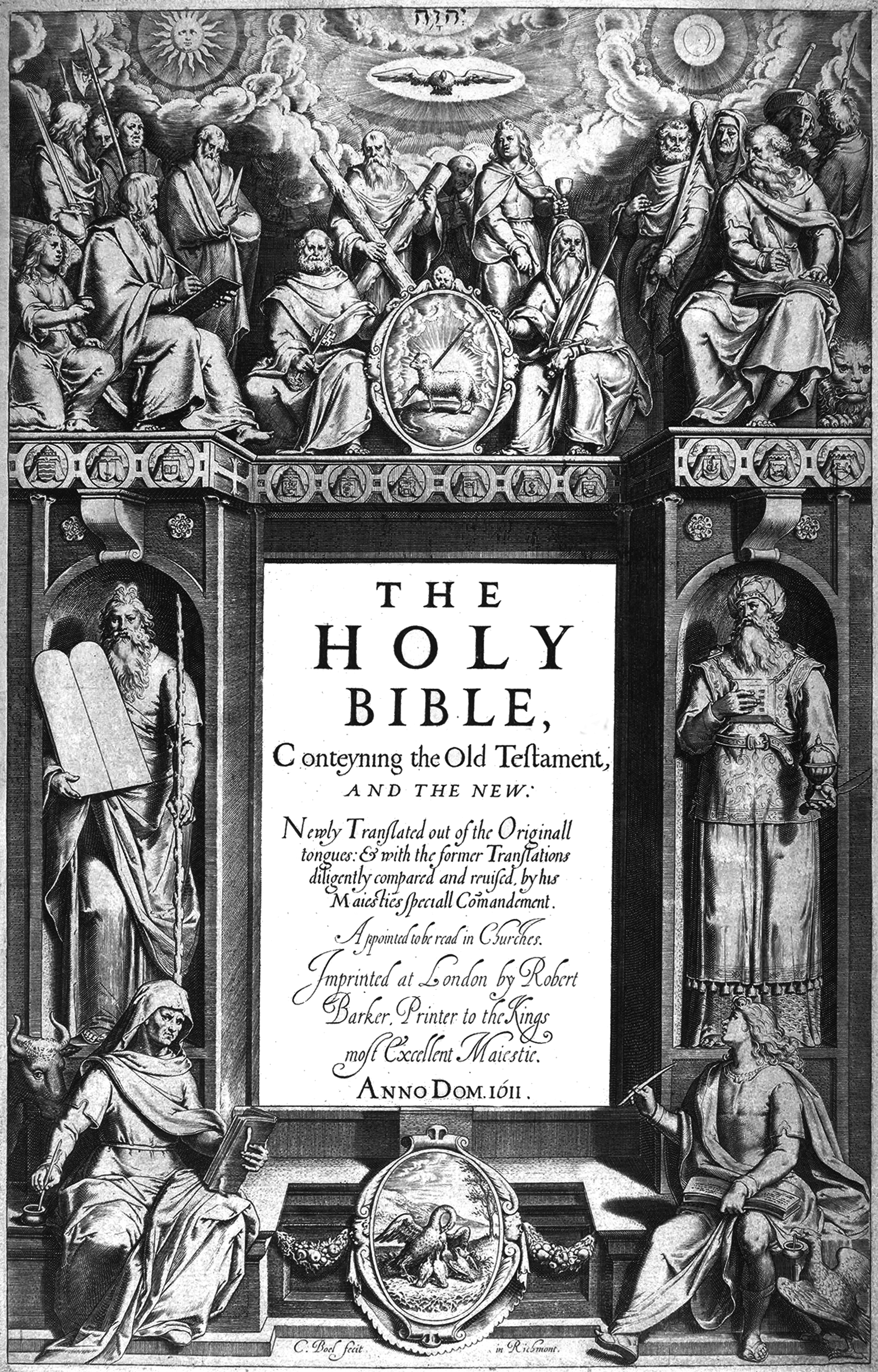
Engraved title page of the first edition of the King James Version, from which the 1662 prayer book derives many Bible translations

The alterations and additions to the 1662 prayer book have been estimated at 600 total from the previous edition. Among these was a new preface. The Preface was part of the original approved 1662 text, and was written by Robert Sanderson, the Bishop of Lincoln. The Preface details the character of the revision—many being enhancements in directions for the officiant, alterations of obsolete verbiage, the change in Scriptural translation, and various additions of new offices. This preface is retained within the 1962 prayer book still used by the Anglican Church of Canada. Also preceding the liturgies is the 1549 prayer book's preface, entitled "Concerning the Service of the Church" within the 1662 prayer book.

While not printed in the original 1662 prayer book nor technically part of it now, the Thirty-Nine Articles were first formally included in 1714. Charles I's 1628 declaration defending a literal interpretation of the Thirty-Nine Articles is appended as a prefix to the articles.

The entirety of the Psalms are included in the prayer book. The Psalter included in the 1662 prayer book is that of the Great Bible translated by Myles Coverdale, which had been the translation used since the 1549 prayer book and similarly used by other prayer books onwards. However, the Authorized Version of the Bible (often known as the King James Version) was selected for the 1662 prayer book's New Testament lections.

=== Holy Communion ===
The priest is to recite one of the two collects for the monarch prior to saying the collect of the day. The collects often followed the models established in the 1549 prayer book, with many being translations of the Gregorian or Sarum collect for a given day or feast. However, there were sometimes additions and elongations of these prayers. Other collects had ending doxologies which were generally omitted from printings as they were popularly known. If these endings were not already included in the collect, they were implicitly deleted by the 1662 prayer book's inclusion of "Amen" as a terminus at the end of each collect. Three new collects were introduced in the 1662 prayer book.

The Anaphora or Eucharistic prayer follows the pattern established by Cranmer in 1552:

- Sursum corda
- Preface
- Sanctus
- Prayer of Humble Access
- Prayer of Consecration
- Thanksgiving after Communion

The Black Rubric was introduced in the 1552 prayer book as a statement of Eucharistic theology, prescribing that kneeling before the consecrated Eucharist was "a sygnificacion of the humble and gratefull acknowledgyng of the benefites of Chryst", rather than suggestive of a "real and essential" change that could be construed as transubstantiation. The rubric was deleted in the 1559 prayer book. Ultimately, even kneeling became a rarer practice heavily opposed particularly by Puritans. The 1662 prayer book reinserted the Black Rubric, though amended. The amended 1662 version revised the rubric to disallow viewing the consecration of the Eucharist as a "corporal" change, permitting a limited theology of the real presence. The Test Act 1673 required that ministers in the Church of England to reject transubstantiation.

By 1714, standard practice was to celebrate Holy Communion on Sundays beginning at 9:45 am. The Communion office, while not the preferred Sunday service until World War I, was still in general high esteem. The 1958 Lambeth Conference's Prayer Book Committee recommended psalms for the Introit and Gradual; metrical hymns were also generally accepted for both portions of the Communion office.

=== Daily Office ===
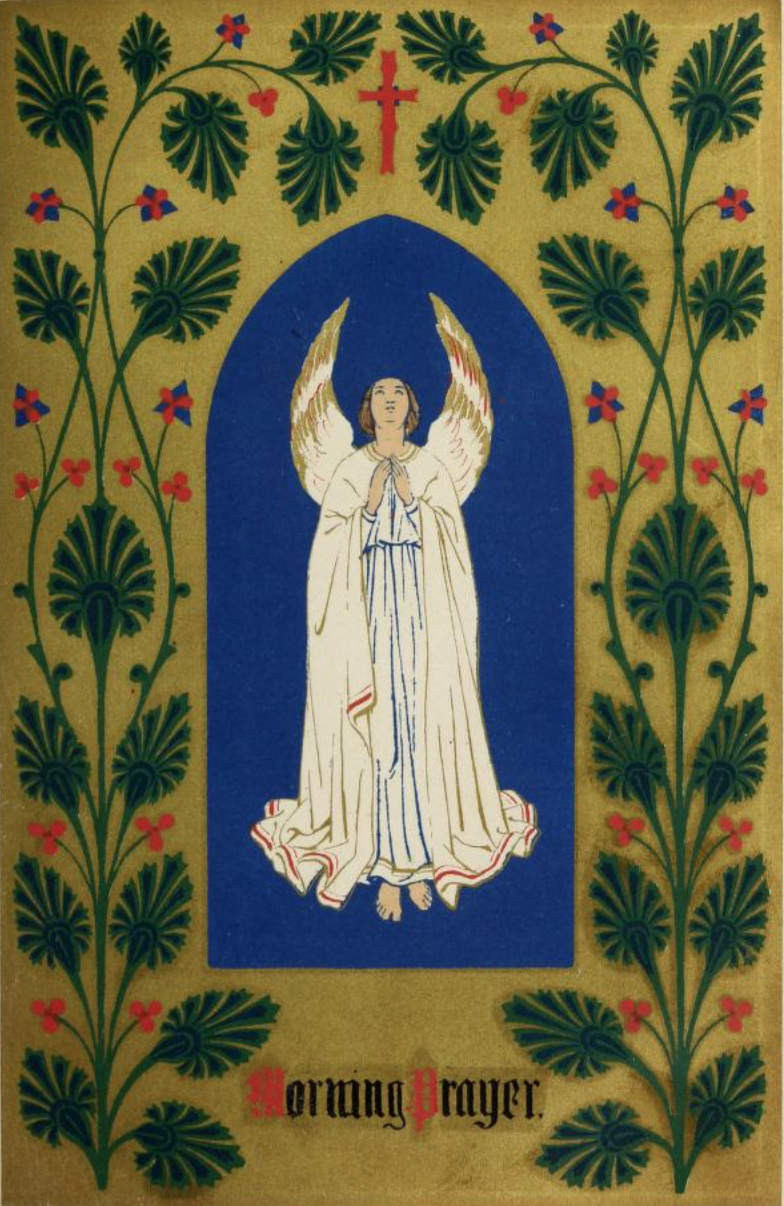
Illustration of Morning Prayer from an 1845 illuminated edition of the 1662 prayer book

The 1662 prayer book retained many of the elements from the 1552 Daily Office, with the addition of state prayers to be appended after Morning and Evening Prayers. Prayers for the state and royal family are found in the suffrages, collects, and Litany. (Note: The specific names and titles printed within the prayer book vary with the persons of the royal family and the gender of the monarch; these are altered with royal warrants that may come years after a mentioned person has passed.) The Litany was largely that written by Cranmer in the 1544 Exhortation and Litany. There were other additions in the occasional prayers and thanksgivings. The second prayer in times of death was added, and two Ember Week prayers—including one first included in the 1637 Scottish prayer book.

The 1662 prayer book introduced a rubric that allowed an anthem to be said at the conclusion of the Daily Office and before the state prayers. These anthems were derived from Latin motets and inspired a renewed interest in Anglican church music. Anthems became a standard feature of English cathedral and collegiate churches, where choirs were standard, further distinguishing the public recitation of the Daily Office at these locations from parochial practice.

By 1714, standard practice was to celebrate Sunday Morning Prayer beginning at 10 am. Morning Prayer was the dominant choice of Sunday service over Holy Communion through the early 20th century. By this point, though, the 1662 prayer book's Daily Office faced criticism as insufficiently reflective of Reformation desires for public celebration of the canonical hours.

=== Occasional offices ===
The offices for baptism within the 1662 prayer book were prepared partially in reaction to the rise of Anabaptistry. The form of baptism "for such as are of Riper Years" was not only suitable for those converting to Christianity in the colonies but those coming from traditions and denominations that did not practice the formerly normative infant baptism. The rubric preceding the public baptismal office was altered to remove allusion to a preference for public baptisms to occur exclusively between Easter and Pentecost and a benediction of the baptismal font was added.

The prayer of thanksgiving after Communion from the Eucharistic celebration was appended to the Forms of Prayer to be used at Sea, suggesting a non-sacramental interpretation of the prayer as the maritime prayers were intended to be used by ships' captains in front of their crew.

Derived from Levitical law, a purification ritual for women following childbirth called the Churching of Women was taken from Sarum practice. The 1662 prayer book's alterations from the 1559 version included a rephrasing of the preceding rubric, replacement of Psalms 116 and 127 with Psalm 121, and introduction of "Let us pray" before the Kyrie in mirror of the Daily Office.

The 1662 prayer book matrimonial office altered the rubrics from prior Sarum and prayer book practice, permitting it to be celebrated independently from a Communion office. The 1662 matrimonial office remains a legal option to solemnise marriages in the Church of England, and a modified form known as Alternative Services: Series One that is also partially derived from the 1928 proposed prayer book was latterly adopted. As in the preceding English prayer books and deviating from medieval English custom, the wedding ring is placed on left hand.

=== Ordinal ===
The 1662 ordinal was changed little from the form found within the first Edwardine Ordinal, with the deletion of rubrics for some vestments in 1552 among the more notable. However, until 1662, the text had been a separate book. In 1662, the ordinal was added to the rest of the prayer book and there were some more substantial additions to the liturgies for ordaining and consecrating presbyters and bishops. These additions emphasised the office of both priest and bishop in contrast to the theology of Puritans and Presbyterians. A new version of the Veni Creator Spiritus introduced in the 1662 ordinal was produced by Cosin to replace that from 1550.

Modifications to the preface of the ordinal made in 1661 were made to distinguish Anglican ministry from those forms that had appeared under the Commonwealth. The 1662 prayer book's office for the ordination of priests closes with an emphasis on the role of preaching, keeping with the 1550 ordinal's ministerial theology. Additionally, the minimum age for candidates to the diaconate was raised from 21 to 23 and, reverting an omission made in 1552, these candidates were to be "decently habited" in vestments.

== Influence and critical appraisal ==
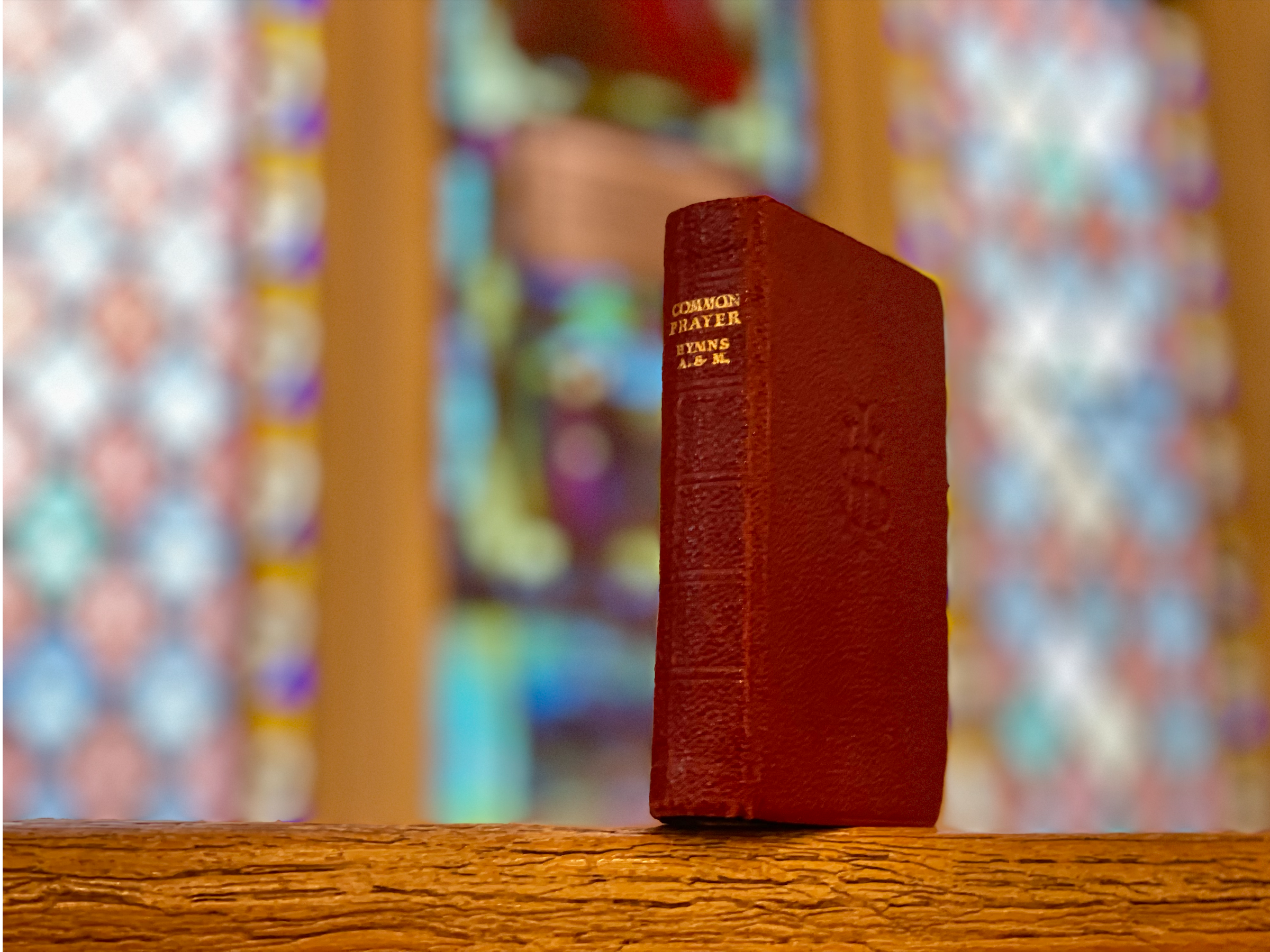
Eyre & Spottiswoode printing of the 1662 prayer book bound with Hymns Ancient & Modern

The 1662 prayer book is considered a significant contributor to the modern English language, with it ranking behind only the Bible in number of common quotations as detailed by the Oxford Dictionary of Quotations. The book has also come to be identified as a mark of English national identity. The historian Brian Cummings described the prayer book as sometimes "beckoning to a treasured Englishness as stereotyped by rain or hedgerows, dry-stone walls or terraced housing, Brief Encounter or Wallace and Gromit."

Rowan Williams, then Archbishop of Canterbury, noted in 2005 the significant impact the 1662 prayer book has had on the English language and literature in particular. He also described the prayer book as "less the expression of a fixed doctrinal consensus" but "more the creation of a doctrinal and devotional climate". It was this flexibility, acknowledged in the 1662 preface, that 19th-century U.S. Episcopal bishop William Stevens Perry suggested gave justification to his church's revisions and alterations.

Following his conversion from the Church of England to the Catholic Church, English writer and critic G. K. Chesterton wrote of the 1662 prayer book in 1935 as "the masterpiece of Protestantism. It is more so than the work of Milton." Chesterton approved the prayer book as best when it deviated least from Catholicism, considering it less a Protestant text and instead "the last Catholic book".

The Global Anglican Future Conference, an assembly of conservative Anglicans, issued the Jerusalem Declaration at their first meeting in 2008. Besides enumerating conservative values, the declaration appraised the 1662 prayer book as "a true and authoritative standard of worship and prayer, to be translated and locally adapted for each culture".

=== In popular culture ===
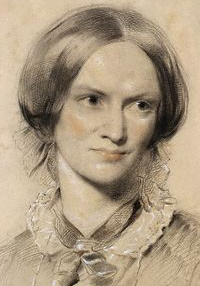
Charlotte Brontë's copy of the 1662 prayer book, a gift from her husband, is now owned by Cambridge University.

The 1662 prayer book's matrimonial office is subtly referenced in Jane Austen's 1813 novel Pride and Prejudice, in which the reasoning of Mr William Collins's proposal to Elizabeth Bennet is given in a manner parodying the three points given in the prayer book for the purpose of marriage. Austen's father, George Austen, was a Church of England parish rector. In her regular recitation of the 1662 prayer book's liturgies and devotions, Austen is estimated to have said the Lord's Prayer at least 30,000 times.

Events in Charlotte Brontë's 1847 novel Jane Eyre have been noted for their correspondence with the dates of particular lessons in the 1662 prayer book. The Brontë sisters were the daughters of Patrick Brontë, a Church of England cleric who would lead the sisters in the regimen of prayer delineated by the prayer book. Among the dates thought intentionally included in Jane Eyre to allude to the day's lessons are 5 and 6 November, a day that marks an improvement in the titular character's fortunes. On these days, the two lessons from Ecclesiasticus correspond with the themes of Jane discovering her true identity. Charlotte Brontë's copy of the 1662 prayer book, gifted by her future husband Arthur Bell Nicholls and later acquired by Francis Jenkinson, resides in Cambridge University Library's special collections.

The popular phrase "Dearly Beloved" is associated with marriage across multiple religious traditions. While introduced to the English language by William Tyndale's translation of the Greek word ἀγαπητός (agapétos) for his production of the Bible, as well as subsequent versions produced by Myles Coverdale, the phrase attained popularity after its inclusion in the 1662 prayer book. Perhaps best known for its appearance in the matrimonial office, it also appears in Morning and Evening Prayer as part of the officiating minister's exhortations to the congregation and the visitation of the sick. A slightly altered permutation, "my beloved brethren", appears in the office of burial.

== Other Anglican revisions ==
Following the abortive 1637 prayer book and prior to the Glorious Revolution, the Church of Scotland did not have an authorised prayer book and the liturgies were conducted generally in a Low Church fashion. William III established Presbyterianism as the faith of the Church of Scotland in 1690, leaving the disestablished Scottish Episcopalians to seek printings of the 1662 prayer book to continue their worship. English churchmen and Oxford University Press obliged, solidifying it as a preferred option among early Scottish Episcopalian Nonjurors. By the first decades of the 18th century, some Scottish Episcopalians sought a service book to replace the popular 1662 prayer book. Some Scottish critiques of the 1662 prayer book stemmed from its deviation from four "primitive" practices, which nonjuring divines termed "Usages". These were the invocation of the Holy Spirit in the consecration, the Prayer of Oblation, prayers for the dead, and the mixed chalice.

The resulting 1718 Nonjuror Office (Note: Published as the A Communion Office taken partly from the Primitive liturgies and partly from the first English reformed Common-Prayer Book. Those who used the text were referred to as "Usagers"; a significant number of Scottish Episcopalians did not immediately adopt the 1718 Communion office.) introduced an epiclesis, or invocation of the Holy Spirit over the bread and wine during the prayer of consecration, a reflection of West Syriac and Byzantine influence. The epiclesis would remain a hallmark of the native Scottish liturgies, especially as the influence of ancient Jerusalem's liturgical practices grew. The 1662 prayer book would again attain favour over these native Scottish liturgies in the 19th century, but would be officially replaced in 1912 when the Scottish Episcopal Church approved a complete native prayer book. (Note: By 1900, the 1662 prayer book was dominant in the Scottish Episcopal Church, with only the native Communion office occasionally serving as an alternative to the 1662 liturgies.) However, as the 1662 prayer book proved still popular, its Communion office was retained in both the 1912 and 1929 Scottish prayer books.

The independence of the United States following the American Revolutionary War resulted in the independence of the American Episcopal Church. Its first native bishop, Samuel Seabury, was ordained by Scottish Episcopalians. As such, the Episcopal Church's first prayer book—approved in 1789 and published in 1790—was largely an adaption of the 1662 prayer book with the alteration or removal of certain state prayers with the addition of Scottish elements to the Communion office.

Prior to the unification of the Kingdoms of Ireland and Great Britain by the 1800 Act of Union and 1801 establishment of the United Church of England and Ireland, the Church of Ireland was a separate church. Despite this, in 1666, the Church of Ireland adopted the English 1662 prayer book. Until the union, the Church of Ireland's prayer book accrued minor modifications, including an office for the visitation of prisoners approved in 1711 and added in 1721. During the whole period of the unified church until after the 1871 separation, the versions of the 1662 prayer book approved in England without the Irish modifications were used. It was replaced in 1878 by a native Irish prayer book.

Through the 19th century, Anglican denominations in regions without a British imperial presence would develop their own editions of the prayer book, often based on the 1662 edition. A native prayer book was developed by the Spanish Reformed Episcopal Church in 1881. The structure aligned with that of the 1662 prayer book and was in part a translation of that text, with additions from the Mozarabic Rite and other medieval sources. Most of the Mozarabic influences were introduced as supplements or options to the 1662 liturgy. The Anglican Church in Japan (Japanese: 日本聖公会, romanized: Nippon Sei Ko Kai, NSKK) developed from both U.S. Episcopal Church and Church of England missionary efforts and these two groups proved influential on the 1878 to 1895 prayer book revision process. The original edition of The Book of Common Prayer of NSKK was largely derived from the 1662 and American 1789 prayer books and, where it deviated from these two models, offered their liturgies as alternatives.

The 1662 prayer book remained a relevant factor in worship and the revision processes across the Anglican Communion, but Anglo-Catholic models of the Communion office dominated from the 1920s to the 1960s. However, there were limited exceptions. The Church of the Province of Southern Africa (now known as the Anglican Church of Southern Africa) had experimentally adapted Walter Frere's 1911 proposed rite in 1924 and formally as an alternative to the 1662 prayer book's Communion office in 1929. That denomination would later adopt a prayer book heavily derived from the 1662 prayer book in 1954. (Note: The full name of the 1954 South Africa prayer book is A Book of Common Prayer and Administration of the Sacraments and Other Rites and Ceremonies of the Church Together with the Form and Manner of Making, Ordaining and Consecrating Bishops, Priests and Deacons Set forth by authority for use in the Church of the Province of South Africa. The book was notably titled A Book of Common Prayer instead of The Book of Common Prayer and was adopted as such by the Church of the Province of Central Africa. As of 2004, the 1954 prayer book remained in use in Botswana.) The Church of India, Pakistan, Burma and Ceylon, a since dissolved denomination, saw an extended period of revision due to the involvement of an Evangelical faction rather than Anglo-Catholic hegemony, approving a new prayer book in 1960. (Note: The approved Church of India, Pakistan, Burma and Ceylon prayer book was preceded by A Proposed Prayer Book, which was authorised in 1951 and published in 1952. The proposed prayer book's foreword states that material was included from the 1929 Scottish Prayer Book and other prayer books, as well as the Oxford Diocesan Service Book. The 1960 prayer book (printed 1961) includes the following disclaimer in its preface: "Where there is any departure from the words of the Book of Common Prayer according to the use of the Church of England as set forth in A.D. 1662, it is not intended that there should be any departure in doctrine from that standard to which an appeal may be made in matters of doctrine. Nevertheless, this Book of Common Prayer according to the use of the Church of India, Pakistan, Burma and Ceylon is the book to which the assent of the clergy of this Province is taken, made and subscribed.") A similar extended program saw the 1959 approval and 1962 adoption of a new Canadian prayer book.

While a significant proportion of later 20th-century Anglican liturgies shirked the Cranmerian pattern for Eucharistic prayer, the 1662 version was often retained as an option. One such example is the Anglican Church in Australia's 1995 A Prayer Book for Australia, which contains five Eucharistic prayers including a modernised version the 1662 rite. (Note: The 1662 prayer book remains in occasional Australian use. At the Tasmanian Government's proclamation of accession for Charles III in 2022, the Collect for the Monarch from the 1662 prayer book was read by Richard Condie, Bishop of Tasmania.) The Church in Wales, which had for a long time avoided major deviations from the 1662 prayer book, adopted a modest revision in the 1984 prayer book. However, the Church in Wales engaged in a vigorous set of liturgical experimentation and enrichment from the late 1980s onward. Its 2004 prayer book contains seven Eucharistic prayers, some more or less based on the 1662 model.

=== Non-Anglican Communion revisions ===
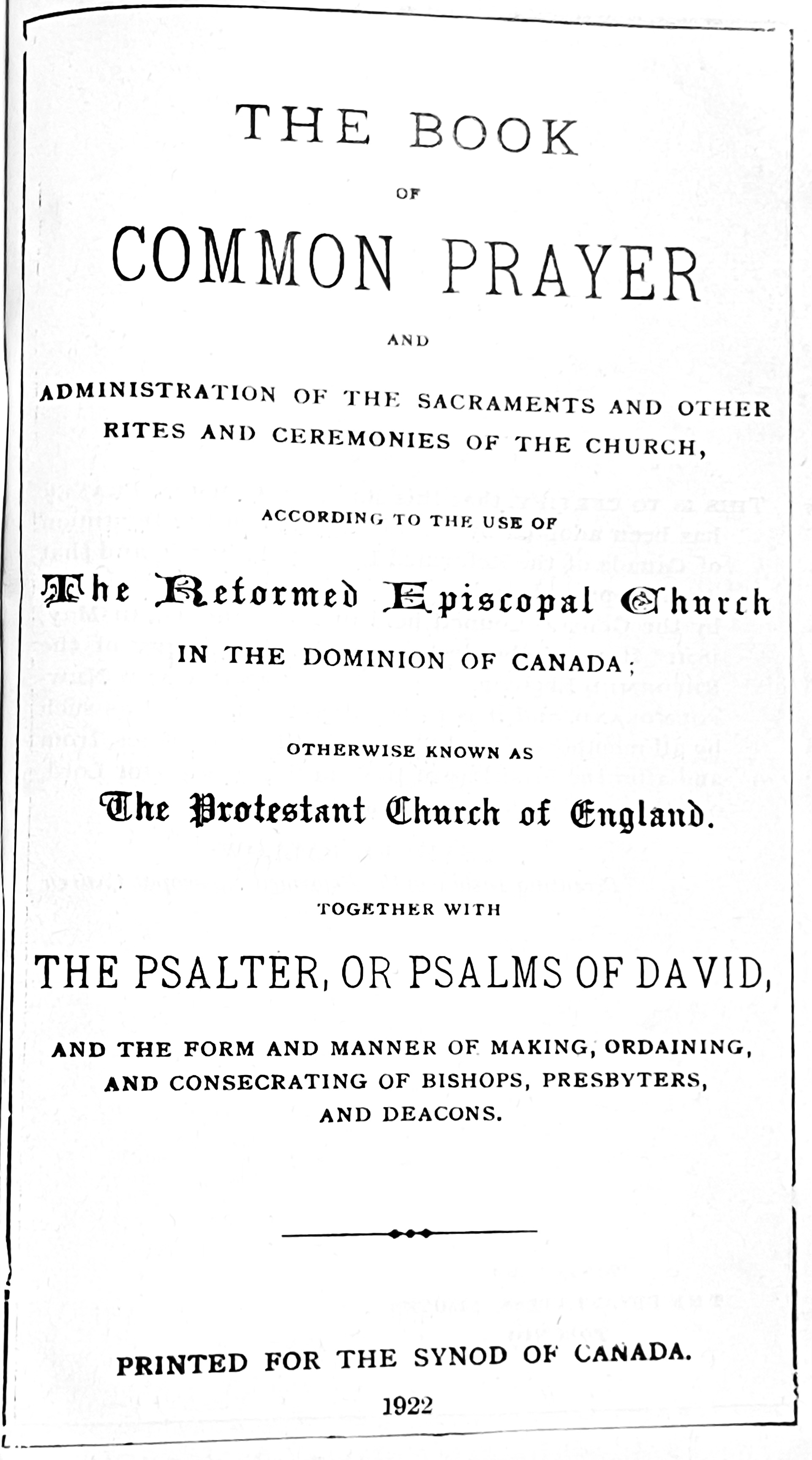
The Reformed Episcopal Church in the Dominion of Canada revised the 1662 prayer book in 1922 to remove "justification for un-Protestant teaching and ritual."

Both the Reformed Episcopal Church in the U.S. and Canada and the Free Church of England in the United Kingdom use prayer books at least partially derived from the 1662 prayer book. While the current 2003 prayer book of the Reformed Episcopal Church includes a preface describing its derivation from the 1662 prayer book, the 1874, 1930, and 1963 editions had been based more closely on the reformed 1552 English and proposed 1785 U.S. prayer books. (Note: The proposed U.S. prayer book upon which early versions of the Reformed Episcopal Church's prayer book are based is referenced in the church's 1873 Declaration of Principles as "The Book of Common Prayer, as it was revised, proposed, and recommended for use by the General Convention of the Protestant Episcopal Church, A.D. 1785." Despite this, the proposed prayer book is commonly known by its 1786 production date, though internally includes reference to the 1785 proposal date.) An early bishop of the Reformed Episcopal Church, Charles Edward Cheney, wrote that for the 1662 prayer book "no fewer than six hundred changes were made in the prayer book, every one of which made it less and less the Protestant liturgy which Edward VI had bequeathed." Cheney also favoured the Reformed Episcopal prayer book's reintroduction the Black Rubric. The Free Church of England's 1956 prayer book similarly removes or adds explanation for "particular phrases and expressions" of the 1662 prayer book that "afford at least plausible ground for the teaching and practice of the Sacerdotal and Romanising Party."

The Anglican Church in North America, a denomination founded in 2009 largely by congregations that had been part of the Anglican Church of Canada or U.S. Episcopal Church, establishes the 1662 prayer book as its "standard for Anglican doctrine and discipline, and, with the Books which preceded it, as the standard for the Anglican tradition of worship." When the Anglican Church in North America released its Ordinal and matrimonial office in 2011 and 2015 respectively, the 1662 prayer book was cited as a basis for both. The church's 2019 Book of Common Prayer contains a Eucharistic liturgy, the Anglican Standard Text, that draws largely from the 1662 prayer book's Holy Communion office as well as those present in succeeding prayer books. A "Traditional Language Edition" of the 2019 prayer book, produced by members of the Episcopal Diocese of Fort Worth, was dedicated in June 2022 by the ACNA. The book was intended to render the 2019 prayer book in Elizabethan English, using the 1662 prayer book's language "where possible" and replacing the 2019 edition's "New Coverdale Psalter" with one akin to the Coverdale Psalter of the 1662 and 1928 American prayer books.

In 2021, InterVarsity Press published The 1662 Book of Common Prayer: International Edition, a non-ecclesial revision of the 1662 prayer book. Besides modernising syntax and spelling, certain elements such as the state prayers were drawn other Anglican prayer books, prominently the 1928 U.S. Episcopal Church prayer book and the 1960 Ghanan prayer book. Though not developed through an Anglican denomination, the text has received international endorsement from individual Anglican bishops and priests.

== Use and revision by other groups ==
=== Catholic Church ===
In 1980, Pope John Paul II approved a pastoral provision whereby U.S. Episcopal Church clergy, including those already married, could be received into the Catholic Church. After Catholic ordination, they would be permitted to celebrate liturgies largely derived from the Anglican tradition. This provision resulted in the Sacred Congregation for the Sacraments and Divine Worship starting work on "Anglican Use" liturgies for Catholic Church usage in 1983. This produced the Book of Divine Worship, first published in 2003, a text containing two forms of the Mass and canonical hours based most directly on the 1979 U.S. prayer book.

In 2009, Benedict XVI issued the apostolic constitution Anglicanorum coetibus which established personal ordinariates for former Anglicans in the Catholic Church and expanded permissions for the Anglican Use liturgy into territories regularly using the English prayer book tradition. The Customary of Our Lady of Walsingham, a Daily Office book developed from the English prayer book tradition for the Personal Ordinariate of Our Lady of Walsingham in the United Kingdom, was published on the 350th anniversary of the 1662 prayer book. The 1662 prayer book provides the basis for Morning Prayer and Evening Prayer in the 2021 Divine Worship: Daily Office: Commonwealth Edition which replaced the Customary for use by the Personal Ordinariate of Our Lady of Walsingham and the Personal Ordinariate of Our Lady of the Southern Cross based in Australia. While the U.S. Episcopal Church's prayer books are the dominant influence on the North America-based Personal Ordinariate of the Chair of Saint Peter, its first bishop, Steven J. Lopes, declared that the 1662 prayer book "is still the authoritative version".

=== Eastern Orthodoxy ===
The prayer book's liturgies, particularly its Holy Communion and Ordinal offices, were reviewed in an Eastern Orthodox perspective by Julian Joseph Overbeck in 1869, with the Russian Orthodox Church and later the Greek Orthodox Church issuing official approval for Overbeck's assessment. The ranking Russian Orthodox bishop in the U.S., Tikhon, submitted a request for a possible adaption of the U.S. Episcopal Church's 1892 prayer book to be used by Episcopal priests entering the Russian Orthodox Church. The 1904 response from the Russian Orthodox synod reviewing of the 1662 and later U.S. Episcopal Church prayer books found deficiencies in the manner and theology of the liturgies, though opened the door to permitting a revised version.

The Liturgy of Saint Tikhon is a Western Rite Orthodox revision of the Book of Common Prayer Eucharistic liturgy. While Tikhon, who later became Patriarch of Moscow and was canonised in the Eastern Orthodox Church, did not directly produce or approve the liturgy—it was first approved by the Antiochian Western Rite Vicariate in 1977—the liturgy is named in his honour. Though this liturgy is derived largely from the U.S. prayer book tradition, it has influences traceable to the 1662 prayer book. As of 2012, roughly thirty to forty per cent of Antiochian Western Rite parishes used the Liturgy of Saint Tikhon, with the remainder using the Liturgy of Saint Gregory, a revision of the Roman Rite Mass. Kallistos Ware, a convert to Eastern Orthodoxy from Anglicanism with a personal familiarity with the 1662 prayer book, opted against the Western Rite but retained 17th-century English lexicon for his translations of the Festal Menaion and the Lenten Triodion.

=== Methodism ===
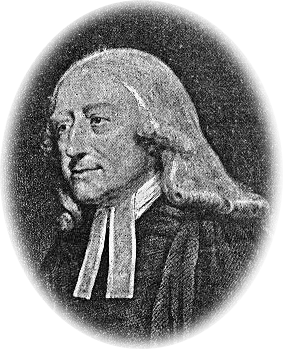
John Wesley, Church of England cleric and founder of Methodism

John Wesley, in his position as a cleric within the Church of England, established the revivalist movement of Methodism during the 18th century. Besides preaching and social advocacy, Wesley undertook a pattern of liturgical modification to support his fellow Methodists. Wesley was a proponent of Anglican liturgy, saying in 1784 of the 1662 prayer book that he felt "there is no liturgy in the world, either in ancient or modern language, which breathes more a solid, scriptural, rational piety". To enable early Methodists to continue attending the Church of England liturgies according the 1662 prayer book, the first Methodist services were held outside standard church hours on Sundays and were composed mostly of non-liturgical preaching, Scripture reading, and prayer. These events would often featuring paraphrasing or portions of Anglican liturgical material, exposing non-Church of England Methodist adherents to the 1662 prayer book.

Despite his affinity for the prayer book, Wesley desired to adjust its liturgies and rubrics to maximise evangelisation and better reflect his view of Scriptural and early apostolic practises. These generally took the form of abridgments, such as The Sunday Service of the Methodists in North America with Other Occasional Services. Wesley produced The Sunday Service in 1784 on behalf of Methodists in the newly founded, post-Revolution United States as a shortening of the 1662 prayer book. These liturgies were supplemented by editions of Wesley's earlier work, including the 1741 Collection of Psalms and Hymns.

Among Wesley's grievances with the prayer book, voiced in a 1755 essay supporting remaining within the Church of England, were the inclusion of the Athanasian Creed, sponsors at baptism, and the "essential difference" between bishops and presbyters. In the 1784 Sunday Service, he removed the rites of private baptism, the visitation of the sick, the offices of accession, and others. Readings from the Apocrypha were removed entirely, with the exception of one reading from Tobit. Also deleted were reference to The Books of Homilies, the Black Rubric, and saints' feast days. Retained and complementing the liturgies were modified Articles of Religion, derived from the standard 39 Articles in the 1662 prayer book. Influences on Wesley's liturgy included Puritans and Samuel Clarke's work to alter the 1662 prayer book, as compiled and implemented by Theophilus Lindsey for his Essex Street Chapel congregation. Wesley was also familiar with Richard Baxter's efforts to approve a more reformed liturgy at the Savoy Conference and the later 1689 Liturgy of Comprehension.

While some later Methodists—including the Primitive Methodist Church's founder Hugh Bourne—found the 1662 prayer book too Popish, Methodist liturgy continued being shaped by the prayer book following Wesley's death. (Note: "Minor Methodist" denominations such as the Primitive Methodists would continue to operate sans a formalised service book until the 1860s, preferring discretionary liturgies ordered by individual ministers to those derived from the prayer book or its abridgments.) The British Wesleyan Methodist Church developed its own service book, the 1882 Public Prayers and Services, based directly off the Book of Common Prayer rather than Wesley's revisions. The 1882 book used Morning Prayer, the Litany, and the Holy Communion office from the 1662 edition. The 1784 Sunday Service would be revised and reprinted roughly 45 times in England, sometimes as the further reduced Order of Administration of the Sacraments. The 1662 edition-derived Sunday Service has remained a "urtext" for Methodist denominations in the U.S., through its 1932 adaptation by the Methodist Episcopal Church—and its successor denomination, the United Methodist Church and its 1965 Book of Worship—and the African Methodist Episcopal Church's Communion office.

=== Unitarianism ===
The King's Chapel congregation in Boston, Massachusetts, originated as a Church of England parish in 1686. During the American Revolution, the parishioners were largely Loyalist and many fled following the 1776 British evacuation of Boston. Those Anglicans that remained agreed to permit Congregationalists from Old South Church to use King's Chapel in shared, alternating fashion. James Freeman arrived to serve as a lay reader in 1782 and introduced his own theology of Socinianism and eventually Unitarianism.

Using a copy of Theophilus Lindsey's Essex Street Chapel liturgy as a model, Freeman and the King's Chapel congregation created a 1662 prayer book modified to match their nontrinitarian theology in 1785. Freeman and the congregation were both denied entry into the newly independent U.S. Episcopal Church by bishops Samuel Seabury and Samuel Provoost, resulting in it becoming the first Unitarian church in the U.S. King's Chapel continues to operate as an independent Unitarian church with the modified 1662 prayer book as its liturgy, currently in a ninth edition published in 1986.

== Associated texts ==
=== Hymnals ===
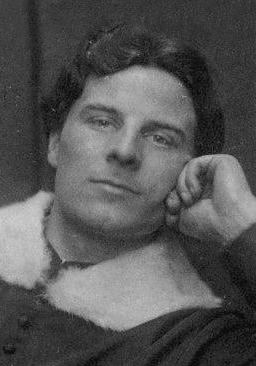
Percy Dearmer produced supplemental material for and histories on the 1662 prayer book.

While the Church of England does not possess a standardised approved hymnal, several hymnals were developed specifically for usage within the church to complement the 1662 prayer book. Hymns accompanying parochial services were not standard, though had grown increasingly popular by the 1830s due to the influence of Dissenter, particularly Wesleyan, practice. Partially due to this exterior pressure and partially due to the desires of Tractarians, Hymns Ancient and Modern was published in 1861. Among its contributors were Jane Laurie Borthwick, Edward Caswall, Thomas Helmore, John Mason Neale, and Catherine Winkworth. A 1904 revision was widely panned for its alteration of verbiage and numbering, as well as the deletion of popular hymns.

While vicar at St Mary-the-Virgin, Primrose Hill, in London, Percy Dearmer determined their usage of Hymns Ancient and Modern to be deficient. Dearmer pursued the creation of his own hymnal with Ralph Vaughan Williams, resulting in the words version of The English Hymnal published by Oxford University Press in 1906. Hymns were provisioned to the offices of the 1662 prayer book, with a tendency towards Anglo-Catholic sympathies. With hymns for the Virgin Mary and the dead, the Diocese of Bristol prohibited the text and prompted the creation of an abridged version which was printed in 1907. The English Hymnal received a minor revision in 1933 and was regularly used through to the 1980s. The 1986 revision, the New English Hymnal, has largely supplanted the earlier versions.

=== Ritual and rubrical supplements ===
In 1894, Ritual Notes was introduced as a supplement to provide greater detail to Church of England ritualist celebrants. The text was written with the intention of serving alongside 1662 prayer book's liturgies, though it also proved popular with U.S. Episcopal Church Anglo-Catholics. Its 11th and final edition was published before the 1979 American prayer book's approval, this later prayer book proving too great a deviation from the patterns Ritual Notes was designed for use alongside. The rubrical text thus declined in general popularity. A similarly High Church supplement, The Parson's Handbook, was created by Percy Dearmer in 1899.

== See also ==
- Anglican Breviary
- Book of Alternative Services
- Book of Common Prayer (1845 illuminated version)
- English Missal
- Liturgy of the Hours
- Lutheran Book of Worship
- Mass of Paul VI
- Primer (prayer book)
