= Fraction (religion) =

Ceremonial breaking of the consecrated bread during the Eucharistic rite

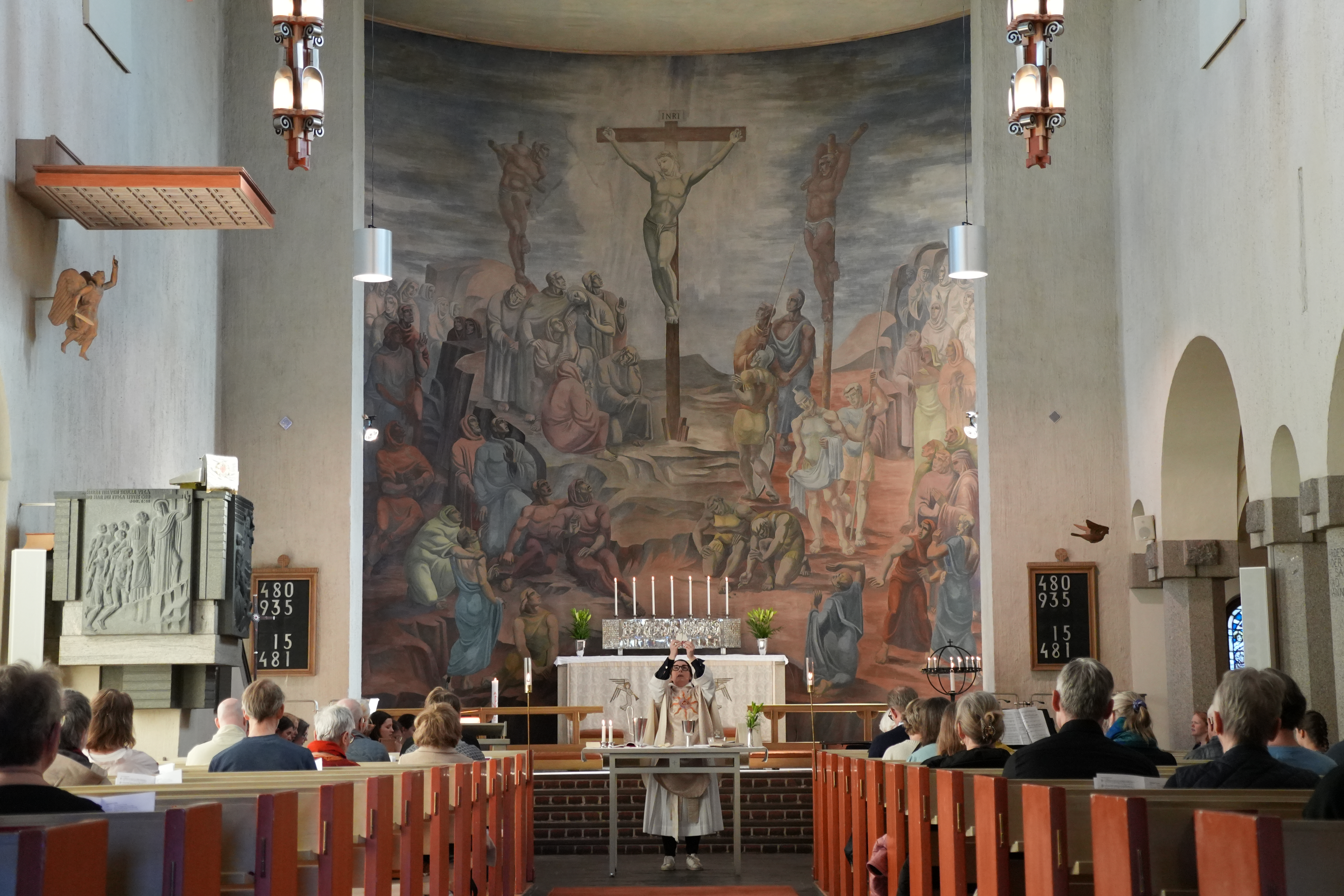
The fraction of the host by the priest during High Mass at Västerled Evangelical-Lutheran Church (Bromma, Sweden) on the Feast of the Annunciation, 2026

The Fraction or fractio panis (Latin for 'breaking of the bread') is the ceremonial act of breaking the consecrated sacramental bread before distribution to communicants during the Eucharistic rite in some Christian denominations, especially Roman Catholicism, Lutheranism and Anglicanism.

== One of four actions ==
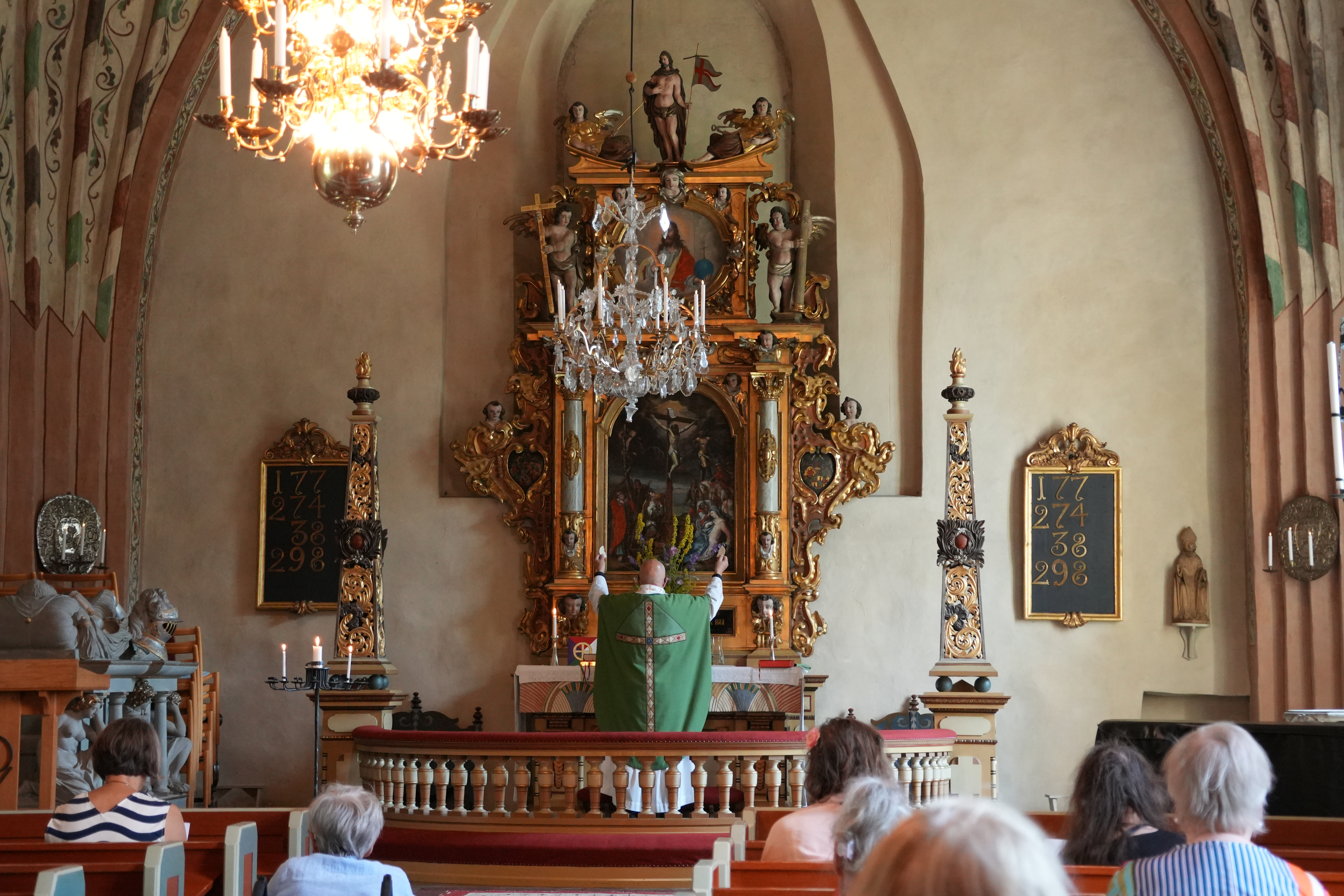
The fraction of the host during the offering of High Mass at Länna Church (Evangelical-Lutheran) in Norrtälje, Sweden

It is almost universally recognized that the rite of breaking the bread is one of the four actions that make up Christian Eucharistic liturgies:

1. taking bread and wine (the offertory)
2. giving thanks to God over the bread and wine (the consecration)
3. breaking the bread (the fraction)
4. distributing the bread and wine (the communion)

== Western Christian ==
=== Roman Rite ===
In the Roman Rite of the Catholic Church, it is accompanied by the singing or recitation of the Agnus Dei. The Agnus Dei is "the liturgical chant which from ancient times has been sung at Mass at the time of the fractio panis, or the Breaking of the Bread, which precedes the Communion Rite of both the priest and the people".

The Catholic Church recommends that the bread for use in the celebration "be made in such a way that the priest at Mass with a congregation is able in practice to break it into parts for distribution to at least some of the faithful". It does not rule out the use of small hosts, "when the number of those receiving Holy Communion or other pastoral needs require it".

It goes on to say: "The action of the fraction or breaking of bread, which gave its name to the Eucharist in apostolic times, will bring out more clearly the force and importance of the sign of unity of all in the one bread, and of the sign of charity by the fact that the one bread is distributed among the brothers and sisters."

The actual rite is described as follows by the General Instruction of the Roman Missal:

The priest breaks the Eucharistic Bread, assisted, if the case calls for it, by the deacon or a concelebrant. Christ's gesture of breaking bread at the Last Supper, which gave the entire Eucharistic Action its name in apostolic times, signifies that the many faithful are made one body (1 Cor 10:17) by receiving Communion from the one Bread of Life which is Christ, who died and rose for the salvation of the world. The fraction or breaking of bread is begun after the sign of peace and is carried out with proper reverence, though it should not be unnecessarily prolonged, nor should it be accorded undue importance. This rite is reserved to the priest and the deacon. The priest breaks the Bread and puts a piece of the host into the chalice to signify the unity of the Body and Blood of the Lord in the work of salvation, namely, of the living and glorious Body of Jesus Christ.

At the 2005 assembly of the Synod of Bishops some participants deplored the practice whereby "the Fractio Panis is gradually assuming an inferior role to the peace". In the apostolic exhortation issued by Pope Benedict XVI following that assembly, he said of the sign of peace: "During the Synod of Bishops there was discussion about the appropriateness of greater restraint in this gesture, which can be exaggerated and cause a certain distraction in the assembly just before the reception of Communion. It should be kept in mind that nothing is lost when the sign of peace is marked by a sobriety which preserves the proper spirit of the celebration." On 8 June 2014, the Congregation for Divine Worship and the Discipline of the Sacraments sent to the presidents of episcopal conferences a letter requesting correction of excesses that had crept in regarding the sign of peace.

=== Western Orthodox ===
In the restored Gallican Mass of the Western Orthodox Church, in which leavened bread is used exclusively, the fraction occurs immediately after the anaphora and prior to the Our Father with its introduction. This is slightly earlier than in other western rites, in which the fraction typically takes place at some point after the Our Father.

The method of the fraction varies from a simple breaking into pieces by hand to a more elaborate cutting with a liturgical knife known as a spear, as is commonly done in the Byzantine rite. The action is accompanied by the singing of a responsory drawn both from the Emmaus account in the Gospel of Luke (Luke 24:13-35) and a selection from the opening verses of chapter 9 of the Book of Proverbs.

Wisdom has built her house; she has founded it on her seven pillars; she has sacrificed her victims, mingled her wine, and set her table.
They recognised the Lord. Alleluia. In the breaking of the bread. Alleluia. Alleluia.
Come and eat of my bread, and drink of the wine which I have mixed. Leave ignorance and you shall live.
They recognised the Lord. Alleluia. In the breaking of the bread. Alleluia. Alleluia.
The bread which we break is the Body of the Lord; the cup which we bless is the Blood of the Lord: a sole and unique Mystery.
They recognised the Lord. Alleluia. In the breaking of the bread. Alleluia. Alleluia.

From Septuagesima until the end of Holy Week, the alleluia is omitted, and the responsory is sung more simply to Gregorian psalm tone 2.

=== Lutheran ===
A number of Lutheran churches, such as the Church of Sweden, Missionsprovinsen and Lutheran Church - International, employ the fraction in the Mass. The host is broken in two, the priest elevates and ceremonially separates the two halves while saying "The bread that we break is a participation of the body of Christ". The priest then brings the two halves, still elevated, back together as the congregation responds "So are we, though we are many, one body, for we all partake of the same bread". The Pax then follows immediately after.

=== Anglican ===
In congregations of high church churchmanship in the Anglican Communion, the fraction is done, similarly to that practised in the Roman Catholic Church and Lutheran Churches. It consists of the priest breaking the Host in half and making an exclamation, such as "We break this bread to share in the body of Christ", and the faithful making a response, such as "Though we are many we are one body, because we all share in one bread". The response may change during certain liturgical seasons, or according to the rite being celebrated. A Fraction Anthem may be sung or spoken during the rite.

=== Reformed (Presbyterian, Continental Reformed, and Congregationalist) traditions ===
Reformed Christians symbolize their belief that Christ is not physically hidden in the bread by breaking the bread. This was a controversial practice among Protestants during the Reformation, as it shocked the sensibilities of Lutherans, who believe Christ's body to be physically present in the Eucharist. Lutherans mocked Calvinists by calling them Stuttenfressers (roll eaters).

== Eastern Christian ==
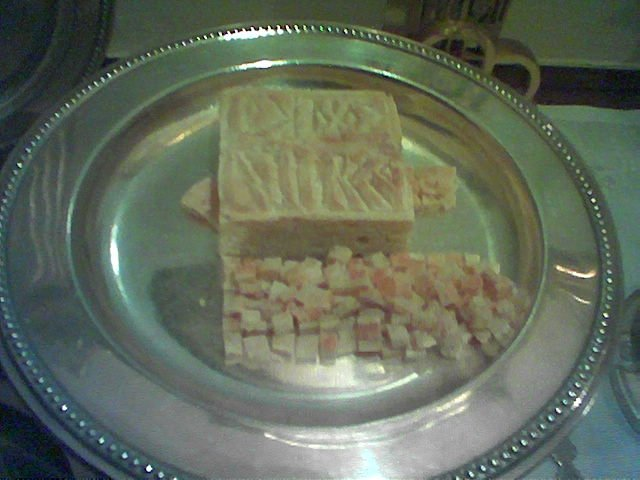
The Lamb and particles as they are placed on the diskos (paten) during the Divine Liturgy.

In the Eastern Orthodox Church and Eastern Catholic Churches of the Byzantine rite, leavened bread is used for the Eucharist. The round loaves, or prosphora, are stamped so that a Greek cross is in the center, with the letters "IC XC NI-KA" (Greek for "Jesus Christ conquers") occupying the quarters formed by the cross' arms. The square portion occupied by this stamp, the "Lamb", is cut out before the Divine Liturgy during the preparatory rite and is the only part consecrated during the Epiclesis. As part of the Liturgy of Preparation, the priest cuts the Lamb part way through crosswise into four sections from the bottom, leaving the bread united by the stamped crust on top.

At the Fraction, which follows the Lord's Prayer and the Elevation, the celebrant breaks the Lamb into four portions along the cuts already made, as he says the words: "Broken and divided is the Lamb of God, which is broken and not disunited, which is ever eaten and never consumed, but sanctifieth those that partake thereof." He then arranges the four pieces crosswise on the edge of the diskos (paten). On the invitation of the deacon, "Fill, Master, the holy chalice," the celebrant takes the piece with the letters "IC" and places it into the chalice saying, "The fulness of the cup, of the faith, of the Holy Spirit."

The portion with the letters "XC" is used for the communion of the clergy. The two portions "NI" and "KA" are divided into small pieces and placed in the chalice for the communion of the people. The portion "IC" is not used for communion, but is consumed by the deacon along with any other consecrated elements left over at the end of the Liturgy (see Ablution in Christianity).

== Bibliography ==
- Barry M. Craig, Fractio Panis: A History of the Breaking of Bread in the Roman Rite, Studia Anselmiana 151/Analecta Liturgica 29, Rome: Pontificio Ateneo S. Anselmo [Sankt Ottilien: EOS], 2011. ISBN 978-3-8306-7426-9
