= Mass (liturgy) =

Type of worship service within many Christian denominations

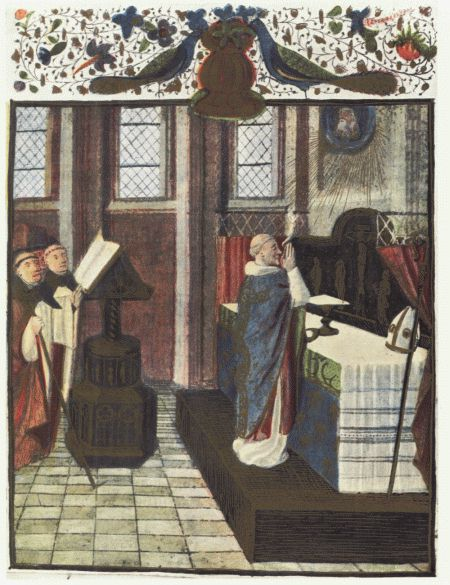
Painting of a 15th-century Mass

Mass is the main Eucharistic liturgical service in many forms of Western Christianity. The term Mass is commonly used in the Catholic Church, Lutheran Churches, Western Rite Orthodoxy, Old Catholicism, and Independent Catholicism. The term is also used in some Anglican churches, and on rare occasion by other Protestant churches.

In Lutheranism, the term Mass is used for the Eucharistic liturgy, especially in the Nordic countries, though in North America, the term Divine Service is used in common parlance. For the celebration of the Eucharist in Eastern Christianity, including Eastern Catholic Churches and Eastern Lutheran Churches, other terms such as Divine Liturgy, Holy Qurbana, Holy Qurobo and Badarak (or Patarag) are typically used instead. Other Christian denominations may employ terms such as or worship service (and often just "service"), rather than the word Mass.

== Etymology ==
The English noun Mass is derived from the Middle Latin missa. The Latin word was adopted in Old English as mæsse (via a Vulgar Latin form *messa), and was sometimes glossed as sendnes (i.e. 'a sending, dismission').

The Latin term missa itself was in use by the 6th century. It is most likely derived from the concluding formula Ite, missa est ("Go; the dismissal is made"); missa here is a Late Latin substantive corresponding to classical missio.

Historically, however, there have been other etymological explanations of the noun missa that claim not to derive from the formula ite, missa est. Fortescue (1910) cites older, "fanciful" etymological explanations, notably a latinization of Hebrew matzâh (מַצָּה) "unleavened bread; oblation", a derivation favoured in the 16th century by Reuchlin and Luther, or Greek μύησις "initiation", or even Germanic mese "assembly". (Note: The Germanic word is likely itself an early loan of the Latin mensa, "table". "The origin and first meaning of the word, once much discussed, is not really doubtful. We may dismiss at once such fanciful explanations as that missa is the Hebrew missah ("oblation" — so Reuchlin and Luther), or the Greek myesis ("initiation"), or the German Mess ("assembly", "market"). Nor is it the participle feminine of mittere, with a noun understood ("oblatio missa ad Deum", "congregatio missa", i.e., dimissa.) The French historian Du Cange in 1678 reported "various opinions on the origin" of the noun missa "Mass", including the derivation from Hebrew matzah (Missah, id est, oblatio), here attributed to Caesar Baronius. The Hebrew derivation is learned speculation from 16th-century philology; medieval authorities did derive the noun missa from the verb mittere, but not in connection with the formula ite, missa est. Thus, De divinis officiis (9th century) explains the word as "a mittendo, quod nos mittat ad Deo" ("from 'sending', because it sends us towards God"), while Rupert of Deutz (early 12th century) derives it from a "dismissal" of the "enmities which had been between God and men" ("inimicitiarum quæ erant inter Deum et homines").

== Types of Masses ==
Certain words may be attached with the word "Mass" to clarify its purpose; for example "Nuptial Mass" is used to describe both the celebration of holy matrimony in the context of the eucharist. A "Requiem Mass" is offered for the repose of the souls of the deceased in the context of a funeral.

== Order of the Mass ==
A distinction is made between texts that recur for every Mass celebration (ordinarium, ordinary), and texts that are sung depending on the occasion (proprium, proper).

== Catholic Church ==
The Catholic Church sees the Mass or Eucharist as "the source and summit of the Christian life", to which the other sacraments are oriented. Remembered in the Mass are Jesus' life, Last Supper, and sacrificial death on the cross at Calvary. The ordained celebrant (priest or bishop) is understood to act in persona Christi, as he recalls the words and gestures of Jesus Christ at the Last Supper and leads the congregation in praise of God. The Mass is composed of two parts, the Liturgy of the Word and the Liturgy of the Eucharist.

Jesuit priest Rune P. Thuringer, writing in 1965, noted that "The eucharistic liturgy of the state Church of Sweden, which is Lutheran, is closer in many respects to the rite of the Roman Mass than that of any other Protestant church." Although similar in outward appearance to the Lutheran Mass or Anglican Mass, the Catholic Church distinguishes between its own Mass and theirs on the basis of what it views as the validity of the orders of their clergy, and as a result, does not ordinarily permit intercommunion between members of these Churches. In a 1993 letter to Bishop Johannes Hanselmann of the Evangelical Lutheran Church in Bavaria, Cardinal Ratzinger (later Pope Benedict XVI) affirmed that "a theology oriented to the concept of succession [of bishops], such as that which holds in the Catholic and in the Orthodox church, need not in any way deny the salvation-granting presence of the Lord [Heilschaffende Gegenwart des Herrn] in a Lutheran [evangelische] Lord's Supper". The Decree on Ecumenism, produced by Vatican II in 1964, records that the Catholic Church notes its understanding that when other faith groups (such as Lutherans, Anglicans, and Presbyterians) "commemorate His death and resurrection in the Lord's Supper, they profess that it signifies life in communion with Christ and look forward to His coming in glory".

Within the fixed structure outlined below, which is specific to the Roman Rite, the Scripture readings, the antiphons sung or recited during the entrance procession or at Communion, and certain other prayers vary each day according to the liturgical calendar.

Traditionalist Catholics use the term salvific "Sacrifice (prosphora, oblatio) of the Mass".

=== Introductory rites ===
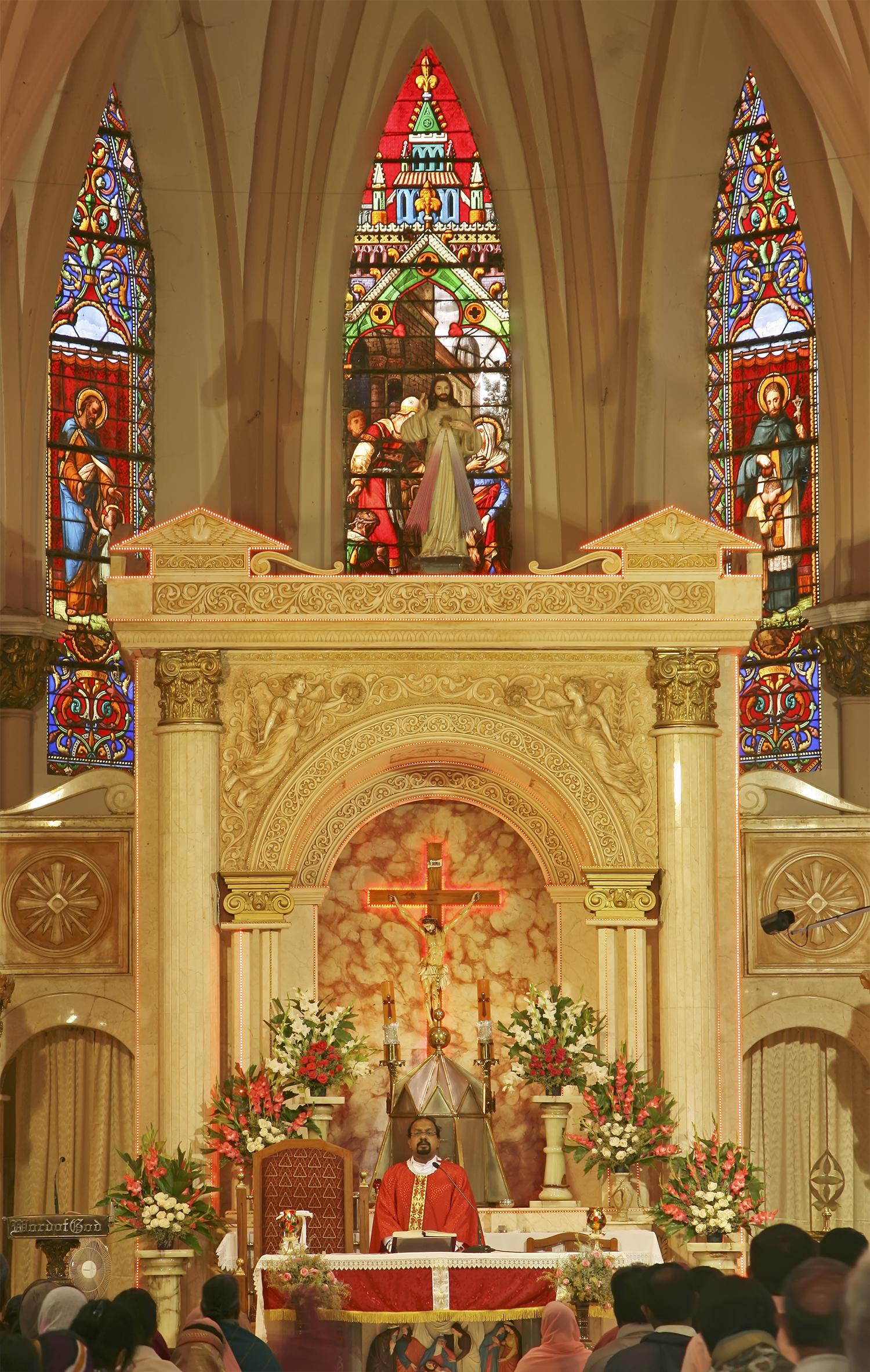
A priest offering the Mass at St. Mary's Basilica, Bangalore

The priest enters, with a deacon if there is one, and altar servers (who may act as crucifer, candle-bearers and thurifer). The priest makes the sign of the cross with the people and formally greets them. Of the options offered for the Introductory Rites, that preferred by liturgists would bridge the praise of the opening hymn with the Glory to God which follows. The Kyrie eleison here has from early times been an acclamation of God's mercy. The Penitential Act instituted by the Council of Trent is also still permitted here, with the caution that it should not turn the congregation in upon itself during these rites which are aimed at uniting those gathered as one praiseful congregation. The Introductory Rites are brought to a close by the Collect Prayer.

=== Liturgy of the Word ===
On Sundays and solemnities, three Scripture readings are given. On other days there are only two. If there are three readings, the first is from the Old Testament (a term wider than "Hebrew Scriptures", since it includes the Deuterocanonical Books), or the Acts of the Apostles during Eastertide. The first reading is followed by a psalm, recited or sung responsorially. The second reading is from the New Testament epistles, typically from one of the Pauline epistles. A Gospel acclamation is then sung as the Book of the Gospels is processed, sometimes with incense and candles, to the ambo; if not sung it may be omitted. The final reading and high point of the Liturgy of the Word is the proclamation of the Gospel by the deacon or priest. On all Sundays and Holy Days of Obligation, and preferably at all Masses, a homily or sermon that draws upon some aspect of the readings or the liturgy itself, is then given. The homily is preferably moral and hortatory. Finally, the Nicene Creed or, especially from Easter to Pentecost, the Apostles' Creed is professed on Sundays and solemnities, and the Universal Prayer or Prayer of the Faithful follows. The designation "of the faithful" comes from when catechumens did not remain for this prayer or for what follows.

=== Liturgy of the Eucharist ===
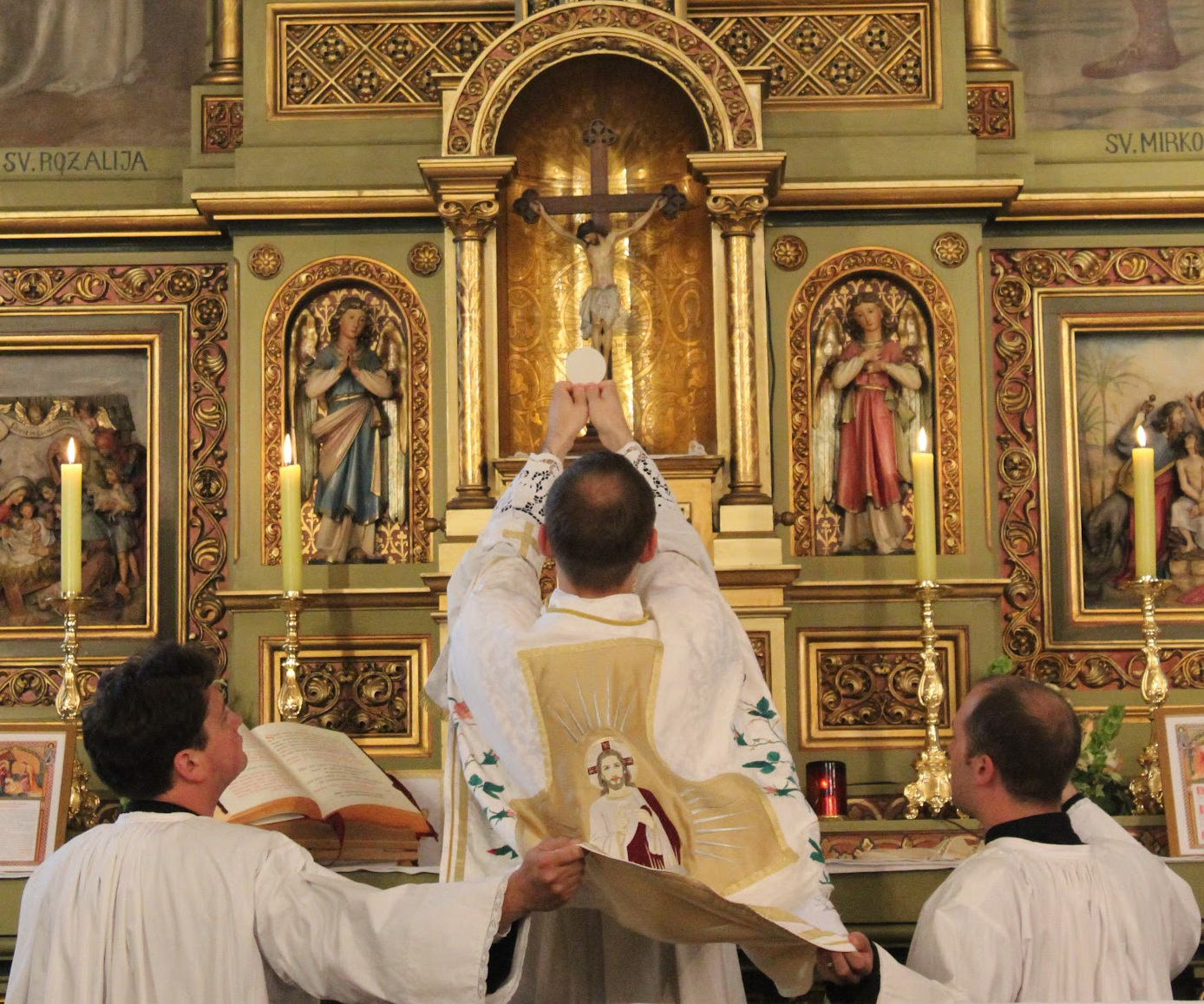
The elevation of the host began in the 14th century to show people the consecrated host.

The Liturgy of the Eucharist begins with the preparation of the altar and gifts, while the collection may be taken. This concludes with the priest saying: "Pray, brethren, that my sacrifice and yours may be acceptable to God, the almighty Father." The congregation stands and responds: "May the Lord accept the sacrifice at your hands, for the praise and glory of His name, for our good, and the good of all His holy Church." The priest then pronounces the variable prayer over the gifts.

Then in dialogue with the faithful the priest brings to mind the meaning of "eucharist", to give thanks to God. A variable prayer of thanksgiving follows, concluding with the acclamation "Holy, Holy ....Heaven and earth are full of your glory. ...Blessed is he who comes in the name of the Lord. Hosanna in the highest."

The anaphora, or more properly "Eucharistic Prayer", follows. The oldest of the anaphoras of the Roman Rite, fixed since the Council of Trent, is called the Roman Canon, with central elements dating to the fourth century. With the liturgical renewal following the Second Vatican Council, numerous other Eucharistic prayers have been composed, including four for children's Masses. Central to the Eucharist is the Institution Narrative, recalling the words and actions of Jesus at his Last Supper, which he told his disciples to do in remembrance of him. Then the congregation acclaims its belief in Christ's conquest over death, and their hope of eternal life. Since the early church an essential part of the Eucharistic prayer has been the epiclesis, the calling down of the Holy Spirit to sanctify the offering and that "the unblemished sacrificial victim to be consumed in Communion may be for the salvation of those who will partake of it." The priest concludes with a doxology in praise of God's work, at which the people give their Amen to the whole Eucharistic prayer.

=== Communion rite ===
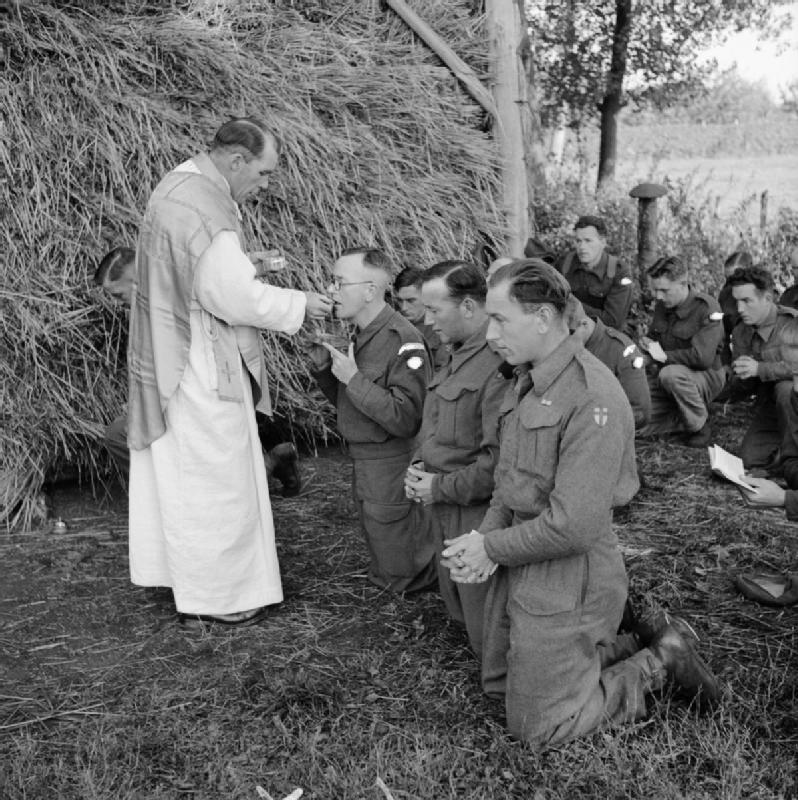
A priest administers Communion during Mass in a Dutch field on the front line in October 1944.

All together recite or sing the "Lord's Prayer" ("Pater Noster" or "Our Father"). The priest introduces it with a short phrase and follows it up with a prayer called the embolism, after which the people respond with another doxology. The sign of peace is exchanged and then the "Lamb of God" ("Agnus Dei" in Latin) litany is sung or recited while the priest breaks the host and places a piece in the main chalice; this is known as the rite of fraction and commingling.

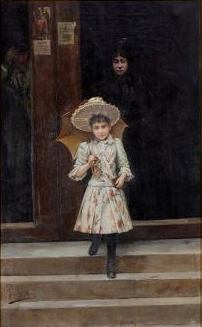
Out of Mass (1893), oil on canvas by Joan Ferrer Miró

The priest then displays the consecrated elements to the congregation, saying: "Behold the Lamb of God, behold him who takes away the sins of the world. Blessed are those called to the supper of the Lamb," to which all respond: "Lord, I am not worthy that you should enter under my roof, but only say the word and my soul shall be healed." Then Communion is given, often with lay ministers assisting with the consecrated wine. According to Catholic teaching, one should be in the state of grace, without mortal sin, to receive Communion. Singing by all the faithful during the Communion procession is encouraged "to express the communicants' union in spirit" from the bread that makes them one. A silent time for reflection follows, and then the variable concluding prayer of the Mass.

=== Concluding rite ===
The priest imparts a blessing over those present. The deacon or, in his absence, the priest himself then dismisses the people, choosing a formula by which the people are "sent forth" to spread the good news. The congregation responds: "Thanks be to God." A recessional hymn is sung by all, as the ministers process to the rear of the church.

== Western Rite Orthodox Churches ==
Since most Eastern Orthodox Christians use the Byzantine Rite, most Eastern Orthodox Churches call their Eucharistic service "the Divine Liturgy." However, there are a number of parishes within the Eastern Orthodox Church which use an edited version of Latin liturgical rites. Most parishes use the "Divine Liturgy of St. Tikhon" which is a revision of the Anglican Book of Common Prayer, or "the Divine Liturgy of St. Gregory" which is derived from the Tridentine form of the Roman Rite Mass. These rubrics have been revised to reflect the doctrine and dogmas of the Eastern Orthodox Church. Therefore, the filioque clause has been removed, a fuller epiclesis has been added, and the use of leavened bread has been introduced.

=== Divine Liturgy of St. Gregory ===
- The Preparation for Mass
- Confiteor
- Kyrie Eleison
- Gloria in excelsis deo
- Collect of the Day
- Epistle
- Gradual
- Alleluia
- Gospel
- Sermon
- Nicene-Constantinopolitan Creed
- Offertory
- Dialogue
- Preface
- Sanctus
- Canon
- Lord's Prayer
- Fraction
- Agnus Dei
- Prayers before Communion
- Holy Communion
- Prayer of Thanksgiving
- Dismissal
- Blessing of the Faithful
- Last Gospel

== Lutheran Churches ==
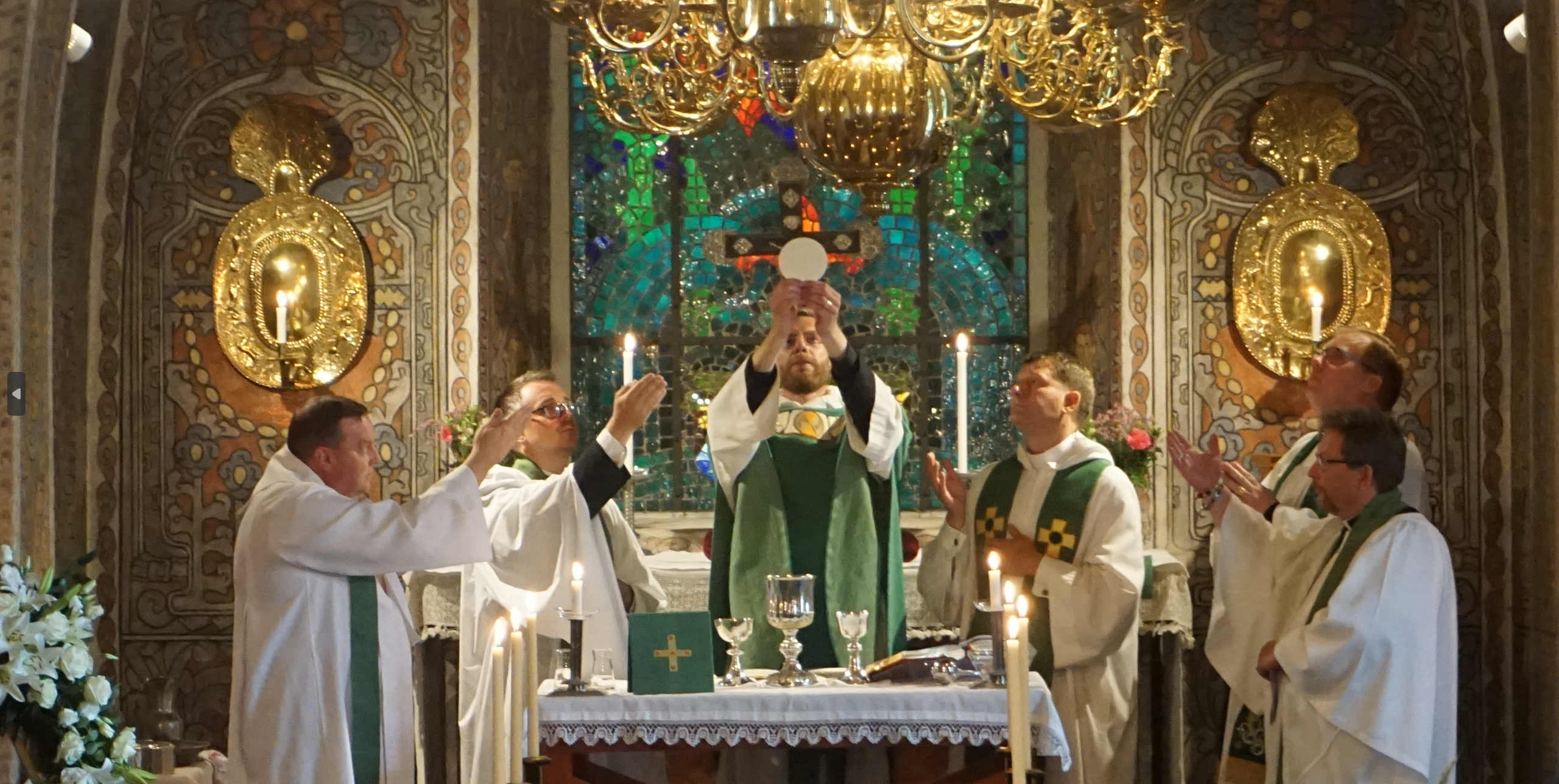
Lutheran priest elevating the host during the Mass at Alsike Church, Sweden

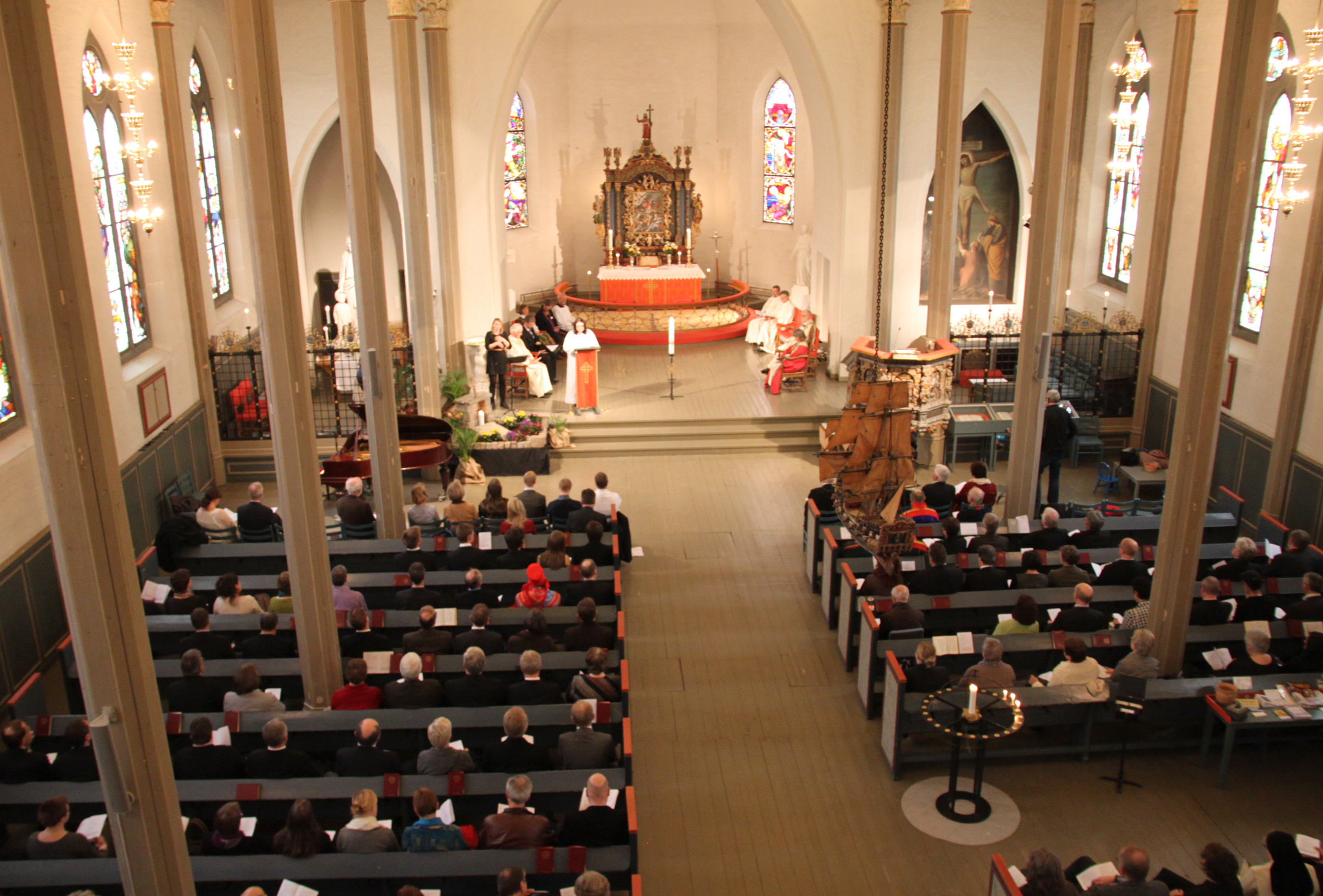
The Lutheran Mass being celebrated at Tønsberg Cathedral, Norway.

In the Book of Concord, Article XXIV ("Of the Mass") of the Augsburg Confession (1530) begins thus:

...the Mass is retained among us, and celebrated with the highest reverence. We do not abolish the Mass but religiously keep and defend it. [...] We keep the traditional liturgical form. [...] In our churches Mass is celebrated every Sunday and on other holy days, when the sacrament is offered to those who wish for it after they have been examined and absolved (Article XXIV).

Lutheran churches often celebrate the Eucharist each Sunday (Lord's Day) in the Mass. This aligns with the Lutheran Confessions, as with the views promulgated by Martin Luther. Eucharistic Ministers take the sacramental elements to the sick in hospitals and nursing homes, as well as prisons. The practice of weekly Communion is the norm in most Lutheran parishes throughout the world. The bishops and priests (pastors) of the larger Lutheran bodies have strongly encouraged the practice of weekly Mass, and daily Mass is offered in some Lutheran churches, as well as at Lutheran convents and monasteries, such as Östanbäck Monastery and Saint Augustine's House.

Traditionally, in the Lutheran Churches, the Mass is celebrated ad orientem, being "oriented to the East from which the Sun of Righteousness will return". Though some parishes now celebrate the Mass versus populum, the traditional liturgical posture of ad orientem is retained by many Lutheran churches.

=== Order of the Mass ===
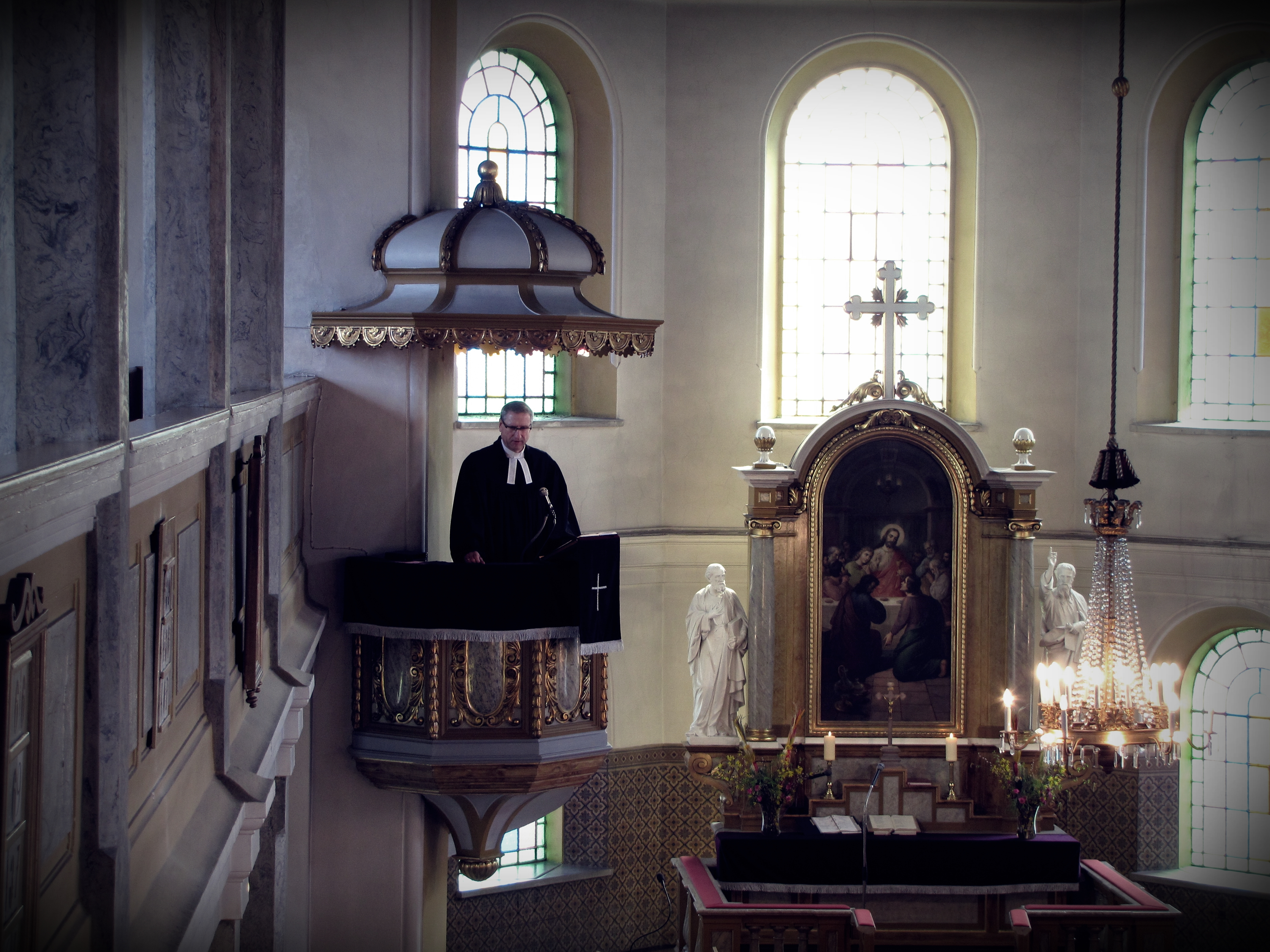
A Lutheran priest delivers a sermon during the celebration of the Mass at the Church of Peace in Jawor, Poland

- Introit
- The Preparation for Mass
- The Absolution
- Prayer of Thanksgiving
- Kyrie Eleison
- Gloria and Laudamus
- Collect of the Day
- Old Testament reading
- Responsorial Psalm
- Epistle reading
- Gradual
- Alleluia
- Gospel reading
- Sermon
- Nicene Creed
- Notices
- Intercessions
- Offertory
- Eucharistic Prayer
  - Sursum Corda
  - Preface
  - Sanctus
- Lord's Prayer
- Fraction
- Pax
- Agnus Dei
- Prayers before Communion
- Holy Communion
- Prayer of Thanksgiving
- Benedicamus Domino
- Blessing of the Faithful
- Dismissal

Lutherans affirm that the Sacrifice of the Mass (sacrificium eucharistikon) is a sacrifice of thanksgiving and praise (sacrificia laudis):

We are perfectly willing for the Mass to be understood as a daily sacrifice, provided this means the whole Mass, the ceremony and also the proclamation of the Gospel, faith, prayer, and thanksgiving. Taken together, these are the daily sacrifice of the New Testament; the ceremony was instituted because of them and ought not be separated from them. Therefore Paul says (I Cor. 11:26), “As often as you eat this bread and drink the cup, you proclaim the Lord’s death.” (Apology XXIV:35)

Martin Luther rejected parts of the Roman Rite Mass, specifically the Roman Catholic Canon of the Mass, which, as he argued, did not conform with Hebrews 7:27. That verse contrasts the Old Testament priests, who needed to make a propitiatory sacrifice for sins on a regular basis, with the single priest Christ, who offers his body only once as a sacrifice. The theme is carried out also in Hebrews 9:26, 9:28, and 10:10. Luther composed as a replacement a revised Latin-language rite, Formula Missae, in 1523, and the vernacular Deutsche Messe in 1526. The Formula Missae supplanted the Canon of the Mass with the following:

(i) Sursum Corda and preface, to 'through Christ our Lord'.
(ii) The Words of Institution, intoned.
(iii) The Sanctus and Benedictus with the elevation of the bread and the cup.

The Apology of the Augsburg Confession affirmed the Greek Canon, and the Pfalz-Neuburg Church Order (1543), modeled by the Lutheran divine Philip Melanchthon includes the following Eucharistic Prayer prior to the Words of Institution:

Lord Jesus Christ, thou only true Son of the living God, who hast given thy body unto bitter death for us all, and hast shed thy blood for the forgiveness of our sins, and hast bidden all thy disciples to eat that same thy body and to drink thy blood whereby to remember thy death ; we bring before thy divine Majesty these thy gifts of bread and wine and beseech thee to hallow and bless the same by thy divine grace, goodness and power and ordain [schaffen] that this bread and wine may be [sei] thy body and blood, even unto eternal life to all who eat and drink thereof.

The Order of the Mass produced under the liturgical reforms of the Lutheran divine Olavus Petri, expanded the anaphora from the Formula Missae, which liturgical scholar Frank Senn states fostered "a church life that was both catholic and evangelical, embracing the whole population of the country and maintaining continuity with pre-Reformation traditions, but centered in the Bible's gospel."

Scandinavian, Finnish, and some English-speaking Lutherans, use the term "Mass" for their Eucharistic service, though in most German- and English-speaking churches, the terms "Divine Service", "Holy Communion, or "the Holy Eucharist" are used more frequently, though the term "Mass" enjoys usage as well.

== Anglican Churches ==
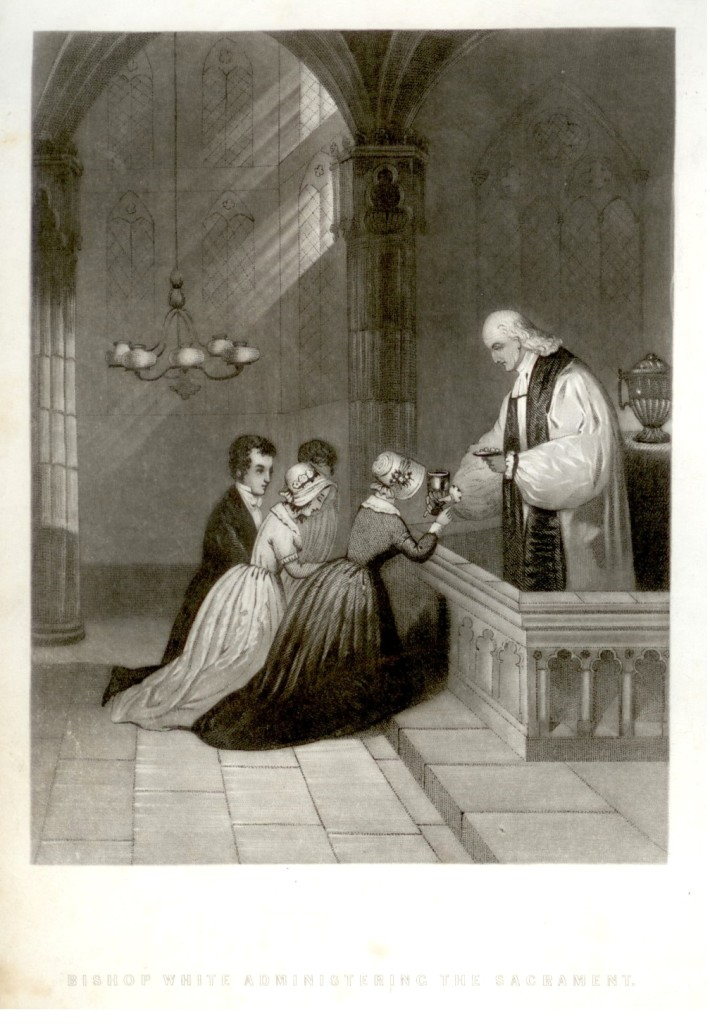
Bishop William White celebrating Holy Communion in choir dress (19th century)

In the Anglican tradition, Mass is one of many terms for the Eucharist. More frequently, the term used is either Holy Communion, Holy Eucharist, or the Lord's Supper. Occasionally the term used in Eastern churches, the Divine Liturgy, is also used. In the English-speaking Anglican world, the term used often identifies the Eucharistic theology of the person using it. "Mass" is frequently used by Anglo-Catholics.

=== Structure of the rite ===
The various Eucharistic liturgies used by national churches of the Anglican Communion have continuously evolved from the 1549 and 1552 editions of the Book of Common Prayer, both of which owed their form and contents chiefly to the work of Thomas Cranmer, who in about 1547 had rejected the medieval theology of the Mass. Although the 1549 rite retained the traditional sequence of the Mass, its underlying theology was Cranmer's and the four-day debate in the House of Lords during December 1548 makes it clear that this had already moved far beyond traditional Catholicism. In the 1552 revision, this was made clear by the restructuring of the elements of the rite while retaining nearly all the language so that it became, in the words of an Anglo-Catholic liturgical historian (Arthur Couratin) "a series of communion devotions; disembarrassed of the Mass with which they were temporarily associated in 1548 and 1549". Some rites, such as the 1637 Scottish rite and the 1789 rite in the United States, went back to the 1549 model. From the time of the Elizabethan Settlement in 1559 the services allowed for a certain variety of theological interpretation. Today's rites generally follow the same general five-part shape. Some or all of the following elements may be altered, transposed or absent depending on the rite, the liturgical season and use of the province or national church:

- Gathering: Begins with a Trinitarian-based greeting or seasonal acclamation ("Blessed be God: Father, Son and Holy spirit. And Blessed be his kingdom, now and forever. Amen"). Then the Kyrie and a general confession and absolution follow. On Sundays outside Advent and Lent and on major festivals, the Gloria in Excelsis Deo is sung or said. The entrance rite then concludes with the collect of the day.
- Proclaiming and Hearing the Word: Usually two to three readings of Scripture, one of which is always from the Gospels, plus a psalm (or portion thereof) or canticle between the lessons. This is followed by a sermon or homily; the recitation of one of the Creeds, viz., the Apostles' or Nicene, is done on Sundays and feasts.
- The Prayers of the People: Quite varied in their form.
- The Peace: The people stand and greet one another and exchange signs of God's peace in the name of the Lord. It functions as a bridge between the prayers, lessons, sermon and creeds to the Communion part of the Eucharist.
- The Celebration of the Eucharist: The gifts of bread and wine are brought up, along with other gifts (such as money or food for a food bank, etc.), and an offertory prayer is recited. Following this, a Eucharistic Prayer (called "The Great Thanksgiving") is offered. This prayer consists of a dialogue (the Sursum Corda), a preface, the sanctus and benedictus, the Words of Institution, the Anamnesis, an Epiclesis, a petition for salvation, and a Doxology. The Lord's Prayer precedes the fraction (the breaking of the bread), followed by the Prayer of Humble Access or the Agnus Dei and the distribution of the sacred elements (the bread and wine).
- Dismissal: There is a post-Communion prayer, which is a general prayer of thanksgiving. The service concludes with a Trinitarian blessing and the dismissal.

The liturgy is divided into two main parts: The Liturgy of the Word (Gathering, Proclaiming and Hearing the Word, Prayers of the People) and the Liturgy of the Eucharist (together with the Dismissal), but the entire liturgy itself is also properly referred to as the Holy Eucharist. The sequence of the liturgy is almost identical to the Roman Rite, except the Confession of Sin ends the Liturgy of the Word in the Anglican rites in North America, while in the Roman Rite (when used) and in Anglican rites in many jurisdictions the Confession is near the beginning of the service.

=== Special Masses ===
The Anglican tradition includes separate rites for nuptial, funeral, and votive Masses. The Eucharist is an integral part of many other sacramental services, including ordination and Confirmation.

Other categories of special Masses include Masses for Various Needs and Occasions, Votive Masses, and Masses for the Dead.

=== Ceremonial ===
Some Anglo-Catholic parishes use Anglican versions of the Tridentine Missal, such as the English Missal, The Anglican Missal, or the American Missal, for the celebration of Mass, all of which are intended primarily for the celebration of the Eucharist, or use the order for the Eucharist in Common Worship arranged according to the traditional structure, and often with interpolations from the Roman Rite. In the Episcopal Church (United States), a traditional-language, Anglo-Catholic adaptation of the 1979 Book of Common Prayer has been published (An Anglican Service Book).

All of these books contain such features as meditations for the presiding celebrant(s) during the liturgy, and other material such as the rite for the blessing of palms on Palm Sunday, propers for special feast days, and instructions for proper ceremonial order. These books are used as a more expansively Catholic context in which to celebrate the liturgical use found in the Book of Common Prayer and related liturgical books. In England supplementary liturgical texts for the proper celebration of Festivals, Feast days and the seasons is provided in Common Worship; Times and Seasons (2013), Festivals (Common Worship: Services and Prayers for the Church of England) (2008) and Common Worship: Holy Week and Easter (2011).

These are often supplemented in Anglo-Catholic parishes by books specifying ceremonial actions, such as A Priest's Handbook by Dennis G. Michno, Ceremonies of the Eucharist by Howard E. Galley, Low Mass Ceremonial by C. P. A. Burnett, Ritual Notes by E.C.R. Lamburn, and The Parson's Handbook (Percy Dearmer). In Evangelical Anglican parishes, the rubrics detailed in the Book of Common Prayer are considered normative.

== Methodist Churches ==
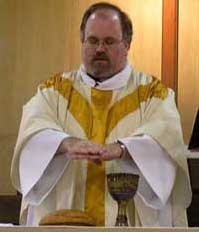
A Methodist minister consecrating the Eucharist elements during the Service of the Word and Table

The celebration of the "Mass" in Methodist churches, commonly known as the Service of the Table, is based on The Sunday Service of 1784, a revision of the liturgy of the 1662 Book of Common Prayer authorized by John Wesley. The use of the term "Mass" is very rare in Methodism. The terms "Holy Communion", "Lord's Supper", and to a lesser extent "Eucharist" are far more typical.

The celebrant of a Methodist Eucharist must be an ordained or licensed minister. In the Free Methodist Church, the liturgy of the Eucharist, as provided in its Book of Discipline, is outlined as follows:

- The Invitation: You who truly and earnestly repent of your sins, who live in love and peace with your neighbors and who intend to lead a new life, following the commandments of God and walking in His holy ways, draw near with faith, and take this holy sacrament to your comfort; and humbly kneeling, make your honest confession to Almighty God.
- General Confession
- Lord's Prayer
- Affirmation of Faith
- Collect
- Sanctus
  - Gloria Patri
- Prayer of Humble Access
- Prayer of Consecration of the Elements
- Benediction

Methodist services of worship, post-1992, reflect the ecumenical movement and Liturgical Movement, particularly the Methodist Mass, largely the work of theologian Donald C. Lacy.

== Calendrical usage ==
The English suffix -mas (equivalent to modern English "Mass") can label certain prominent (originally religious) feasts or seasons based on a traditional liturgical year. For example:

- Candlemas
- Childermas
- Christmas
- Roodmas
- Hallowmas
- Johnmas
- Lammas
- Martinmas
- Michelmas

== See also ==
- Asperges
- Blue Mass
- Chantry
- Eucharistic theology
- Gold Mass
- Liturgical reforms of Pope Pius XII
- Mass (music)
- Mass in the Catholic Church
- Mass of Paul VI
- Metal Mass
- Origin of the Eucharist
- Papal Mass
- Pontifical High Mass
- Red Mass
- Requiem Mass
- Roman Missal
- Sacraments of the Catholic Church
- Solemn Mass
- Suffrage Mass (Votive mass for souls who are in purgatory)
