= Dearly Beloved =

Dearly Beloved may refer to:

== Film ==
- Dearly Beloved, a 1995 short film starring Vince Curatola
- Dearly Beloved, a short film starring Jessica Lee Rose

== Literature ==
- Dearly Beloved (novel), a 1962 novel by Anne Morrow Lindbergh
- Dearly Beloved, a 2009 book by David Wilkerson
- Dearly Beloved, a 1944 novel by Mary Burchell
- Dearly Beloved, a 1990 novel by Mary Jo Putney
- Dearly Beloved, a 1942 novel by Harry Sylvester
- "Dearly Beloved", a short story by F. Scott Fitzgerald, published posthumously in 1969

== Music ==
=== Albums ===
- Dearly Beloved (Daughtry album), 2021
- Dearly Beloved (Lee Konitz album), 1997
- Dearly Beloved (Stanley Turrentine album), 1961
- Dearly Beloved, a 2004 album by Keely Smith

=== Songs ===
- "Dearly Beloved", a 1942 song written by Johnny Mercer and Jerome Kern, introduced by Fred Astaire in the film You Were Never Lovelier
- "Dearly Beloved", the main theme for the Kingdom Hearts video game series, featured on Kingdom Hearts Original Soundtrack
- "Dearly Beloved", a song by Abramelin from Transgression from Acheron
- "Dearly Beloved", a song by Bad Religion from New Maps of Hell
- "Dearly Beloved", a song by Faith Hill from Fireflies
- "Dearly Beloved", a song by John Coltrane from Sun Ship
- "Dearly Beloved", a segment of the song "Jesus of Suburbia" by Green Day

=== Bands ===
- The Dearly Beloved (band), a 1960s garage rock band from Tucson, Arizona
- Dearly Beloved, an Australian band co-founded by Leeno Dee
- Dearly Beloved, an American band that has collaborated with Merritt Gant

== Television episodes ==
- "The Dearly Beloved" (The O.C.), an episode of The O.C.
- "Dearly Beloved" (Greek)
- "Dearly Beloved" (Kate & Allie)
- "Dearly Beloved" (Law & Order: Special Victims Unit)
- "Dearly Beloved" (Party of Five)
- "Dearly Beloved" (Valkyria Chronicles)
- "Dearly Beloved" (Wild Card)

== Other uses ==
- Dearly Beloved, a 2010 Improvathon event in Liverpool, UK
