= Fraction anthem =

A fraction anthem is a text spoken or sung during the Christian rite of Holy Eucharist, at the point when the celebrant breaks the consecrated bread.
