= Ordinal (liturgy) =

Liturgical book for ordinations

An ordinal (Latin: ordinale), in a modern context, is a liturgical book that contains the rites and prayers for the ordination and consecration to the Holy Orders of deacons, priests, and bishops in multiple Christian denominations, especially the Edwardine Ordinals within Anglicanism, as well as Lutheranism. The term "ordinal" has been applied to the prayers and ceremonies for ordinations in the Catholic Church, where the pontificals of the Latin liturgical rites typically compile them along with other liturgies exclusive to bishops. In medieval liturgies, ordinals supplied instruction on how to use the various books necessary to celebrate a liturgy and added rubrical direction.

== Terminology ==
Historically, ordinals were texts that contained the order (Latin: ordo) of prayers and rituals in liturgies. Additionally, some medieval ordinals were books containing the ordinary of the divine office that would be modified according to the liturgical calendar. These ordinals would establish the ritual order of a rite and provide rubrical direct not present in the other texts used to celebrate liturgies. Ordinals could serve to apply the specific practices of a cathedral or religious order, as contained in their customary, to the other liturgical books. The relationship with medieval ordinals and customaries has sometimes led to them being identified as synonymous.

In a modern context, an "ordinal" typically refers to the liturgical book containing the prayers and rituals associated with conferring Holy Orders in the Latin tradition of Catholicism, Lutheranism, and in Anglicanism. The use of the word in this context is thought to have originated sometime around 1600, perhaps first in John Bramhall's 1636 The consecration and succession of protestant bishops justified.

== Anglican ordinals ==
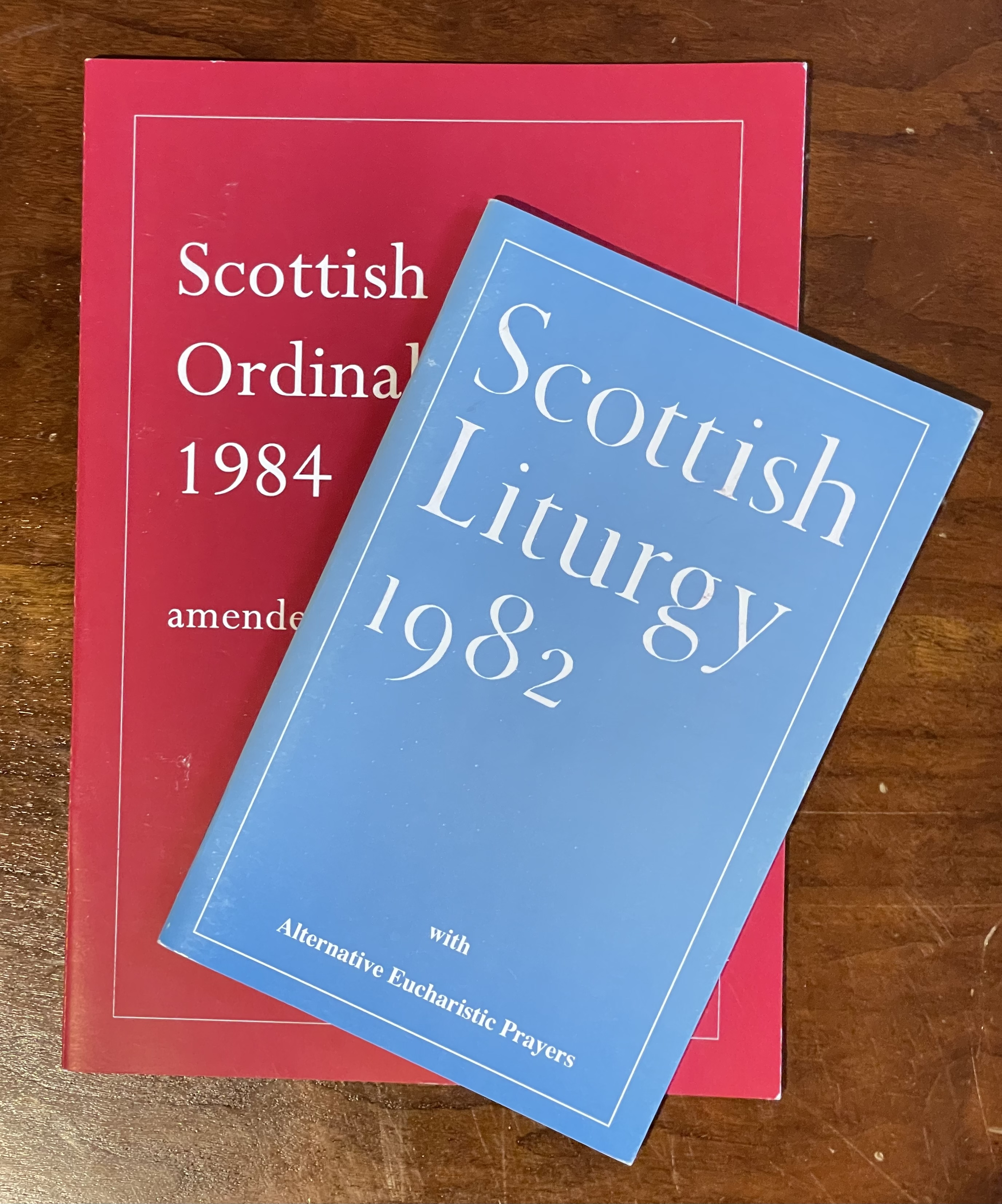
Copies of the Scottish Liturgy 1982 and 2006 edition of the Scottish Ordinal 1984

The English Reformation saw the introduction of Protestant liturgical ethos into the Church of England. Thomas Cranmer led the revision process that produced the Book of Common Prayer – the first version being the 1549 prayer book –, a vernacular replacement of both the various Latin-language missals and breviaries that had previously been used for the celebration of the Holy Communion and daily offices.

In 1550, Cranmer's revision of the medieval Sarum Pontifical, the first Edwardine Ordinal, was adopted. This text dropped many of the rituals that would persist in Roman Pontificals, including the presentation of mitre and ring, putting on of gloves, and anointing of the episcopal candidate. Further Reformed modifications were made in the 1552 ordinal that accompanied the second prayer book of King Edward VI the same year, but very little changed with the adoption of the 1559 Book of Common Prayer. Examining chaplains were introduced via a canon independent of the ordinal in the 1604 prayer book.

The 1552 ordinal has been a focus in debates over the validity of Anglican ordinations, with its preceding non-liturgical preface–containing reformed theological statements–and the ritual itself considered defective and "heretical" by the Catholic Church. These aspects of the 1552 ordinal played a significant part in Pope Leo XIII rejecting Anglican orders in his 1896 papal bull Apostolicae curae. This papal statement was challenged by Saepius officio, penned by members of the Church of England in 1897.

The 1662 prayer book would be the first to include the ordinal not only as a text bound with the prayer book but an integral part of a single comprehensive liturgical book. Simultaneously, the formula for the ordination of priests was modified to explicitly tie the Holy Spirit's descent on a presbyterial candidate to the imposition of hands.

The Alternative Service Book of 1980 was a further development of the Church of England's ordinal. The 1980 ordinal emphasized the different level of Holy Orders and a priest's spiritual capacities. The formulae of the ordination prayers were also altered to be precatory rather than imperative.

Other Anglican bodies have adopted their own local editions of ordinals. Among these are the Scottish Episcopal Church, who issued a revised ordinal within their 1929 Scottish Prayer Book–accompanied by a revised preface and relevant canons–and again with the Scottish Ordinal 1984, which itself was amended in 2006. The Episcopal Church in the United States has similarly revised its ordinal with the successive revisions of its own prayer books. The first edition of the U.S. Episcopal ordinal was published in 1792, two years after the church's first prayer book was approved, and incorporated Scottish elements.

== See also ==
- Common Worship
- List of Anglican bishops who converted to Roman Catholicism
- Elizabethan Religious Settlement
- Ordination of women
- Sthathicon
