= Book of Common Prayer (1549) =

1st Anglican liturgical book

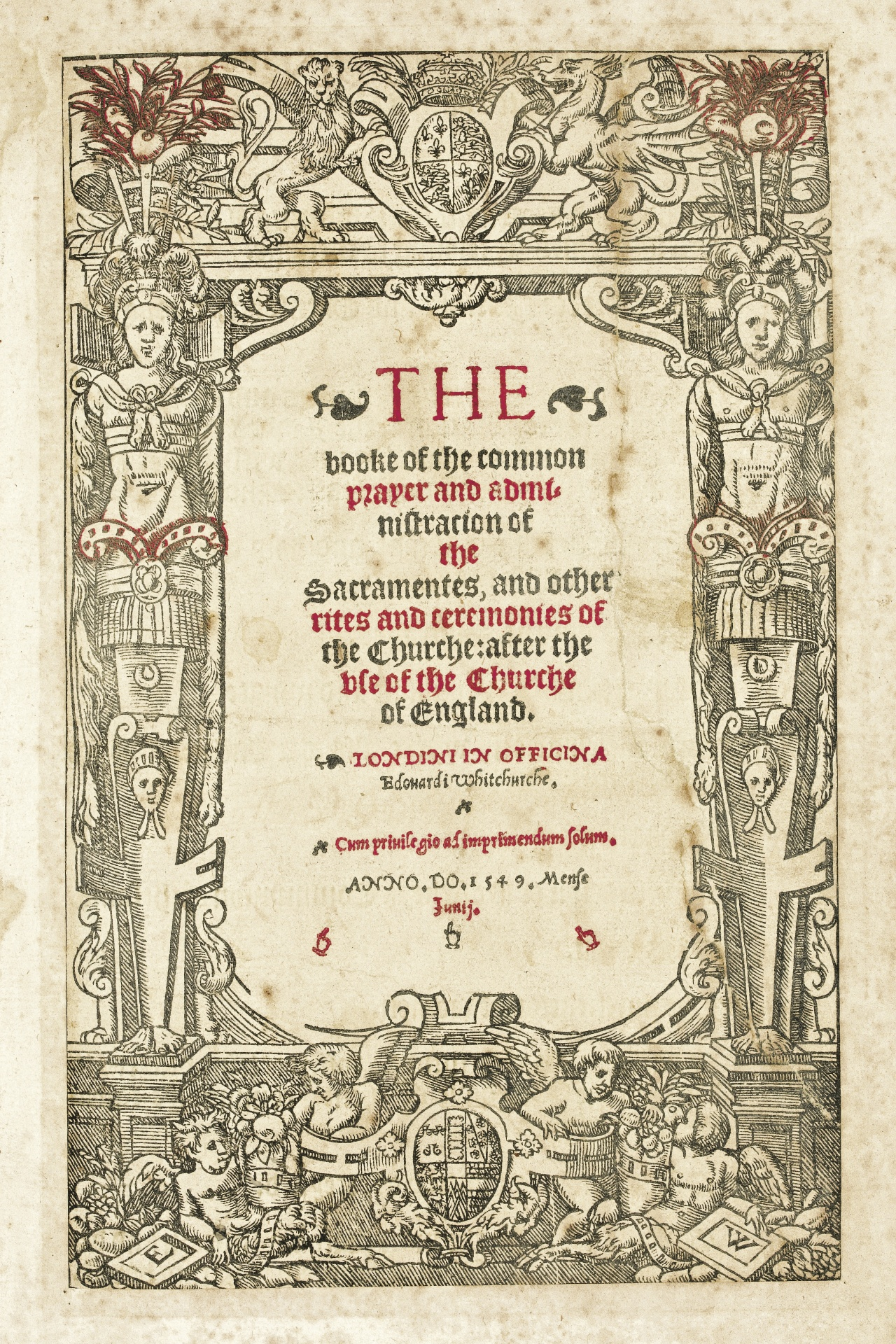
Title page of the 1549 Book of Common Prayer

The 1549 Book of Common Prayer (BCP) is the original version of the Book of Common Prayer, variations of which are still in use as the official liturgical book of the Church of England and other Anglican churches. Written during the English Reformation, the prayer book was largely the work of Thomas Cranmer, who borrowed from a large number of other sources. Evidence of Cranmer's Protestant theology can be seen throughout the book; however, the services maintain the traditional forms and sacramental language inherited from medieval Catholic liturgies. Criticised by Protestants for being too traditional, it was replaced by the significantly revised 1552 Book of Common Prayer.

== Title ==
The complete title was The Book of the Common Prayer and Administration of the Sacraments, and other Rites and Ceremonies of the Church after the Use of the Church of England. The prayer book's title refers to three categories of services: common prayer (morning and evening prayer), sacraments (baptism and holy communion), and "other rites and ceremonies".

== Background ==
The forms of parish worship in the late medieval church in England followed the Roman Rite. The priest said or sang the liturgy in Latin, but the liturgy itself varied according to local practice. By far the most common form, or "use", found in Southern England was that of Sarum (Salisbury). There was no single book; the services that would be provided by the Book of Common Prayer were to be found in the Missal (the Mass), the Breviary (daily offices), the Manual (the occasional services of baptism, marriage, burial etc.), and the Pontifical (services conducted by a bishop—confirmation, ordination). The chant (plainsong or plainchant) for worship was contained in the Roman Gradual for the Mass, the Antiphonale for the offices, and the Processionale for the litanies.

The liturgical year followed the Roman calendar for the universal feast days, but it also included local feasts as well. The liturgical calendar determined what was to be read at the daily offices and the Mass. By the 1500s, the calendar had become complicated and difficult to use. Furthermore, most of the readings appointed for each day were not drawn from the Bible but were mainly legends about saints' lives. When scripture was assigned, only brief passages were read before moving on to an entirely different chapter. As a result, there was no continuity in scriptural readings throughout the year.

The Book of Common Prayer was a product of the English Reformation. In England, the Reformation began in the 1530s when Henry VIII separated the Church of England from the Roman Catholic Church and the authority of the pope. For the liturgy, Protestant reformers advocated replacing Latin with English, greater lay participation, more Bible reading and sermons, and conforming the liturgy to Protestant theology. Henry VIII, however, was religiously conservative, and Protestants had limited success in reforming the liturgy during his reign.

The work of producing a liturgy in the English language was largely done by Thomas Cranmer, Archbishop of Canterbury, starting cautiously in the reign of Henry VIII and then more radically under his son Edward VI. In his early days Cranmer was a conservative humanist and admirer of Erasmus. After 1531, Cranmer's contacts with Protestant reformers from continental Europe helped to change his outlook. By the late 1530s, Cranmer had adopted Lutheran views. By the time the first prayer book was published, Cranmer shared more in common with Reformed theologians like Martin Bucer and Heinrich Bullinger.

== Theology ==
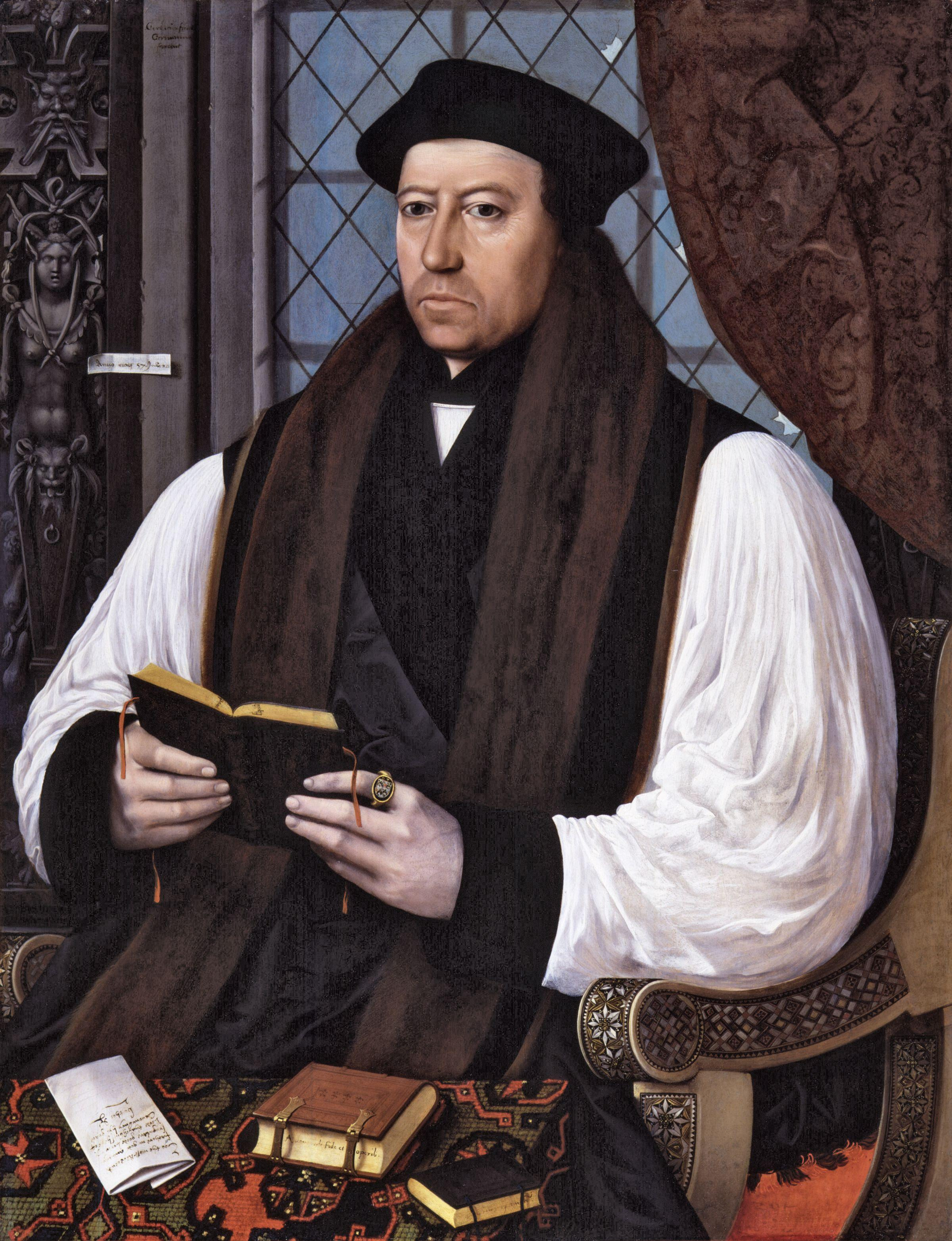
Thomas Cranmer (1489–1556), editor and co-author of the 1549 Book of Common Prayer

Compared to the liturgies produced by the continental Reformed churches in the same period, the Book of Common Prayer seems relatively conservative. For England, however, it represented a "major theological shift" toward Protestantism. The preface, which contained Cranmer's explanation as to why a new prayer book was necessary, began: "There was never any thing by the wit of man so well devised, or so sure established, which in continuance of time hath not been corrupted."

Cranmer agreed with Reformed Protestant theology, and his doctrinal concerns can be seen in the systematic amendment of source material to remove any idea that human merit contributed to an individual's salvation. The doctrines of justification by faith alone and predestination are central to Cranmer's theology. In justification, God grants the individual faith by which the righteousness of Christ is claimed and the sinner is forgiven. This doctrine is implicit throughout the prayer book, and it had important implications for his understanding of the sacraments. For Cranmer, a sacrament is a "sign of an holy thing" that signifies what it represents but is not identical to it. With this understanding, Cranmer believed that someone who is not one of God's elect receives only the outward form of the sacrament (washing in baptism or eating bread in communion) but does not receive actual grace. Only the elect receive the sacramental sign and the grace. This is because faith—which is a gift only the elect are given—unites the outward sign and the inward grace and makes the sacrament effective. This position was in agreement with the Reformed churches but was opposed to the Roman Catholic and Lutheran views.

Protestants were particularly hostile to the Catholic Church's teaching that each Mass was the sacrifice of Jesus for the redemption of the world. To the reformers, to believe that the Mass is a propitiatory offering that forgives sins is to rely on human activity instead of having faith in the efficacy of Christ's death. This was incompatible with justification by faith. Protestants taught that the Eucharist was a remembrance and representation of Christ's sacrifice, but not the sacrifice itself. Protestants also rejected the Catholic doctrine of transubstantiation. According to this doctrine when the priest said the words of institution, the sacramental bread and wine ceased being bread and wine and became the flesh and blood of Christ without changing their appearance. To Protestants, transubstantiation seemed too much like magic, and they rejected it as an explanation for what occurred in the Eucharist.

Protestants opposed the sacrament of penance for two reasons. The first reason was private or auricular confession of sin, which parishioners were supposed to undertake at least once a year. For Protestants, private confession was a problem because it placed a priest between people and God. For Protestants, forgiveness should be sought directly from God. The second reason was that the sacrament of penance demanded some good work as a sign of contrition.

Protestants believed that when a person died he or she would receive either eternal life or eternal damnation depending on whether they had placed their faith in Christ or rejected him. Thus, Protestants denied the Catholic belief in purgatory, a state in which souls are punished for venial or minor sins and those sins that were never confessed. The Catholic Church also taught that the living could take action to reduce the length of time souls spent in purgatory. These included good works such as giving alms, praying to saints and especially the Virgin Mary, and prayer for the dead, especially as part of the Mass. The idea of purgatory was not found in the BCP. Cranmer's theology also led him to remove all instances of prayer to the saints in the liturgy. The literary scholar Alan Jacobs explains this aspect of the prayer book as follows:

In the world of the prayer book, then, the individual Christian stands completely naked before God in a paradoxical setting of public intimacy. There are no powerful rites conducted by sacerdotal figures while people stand some distance away fingering prayer beads or gazing on images of saints whose intercession they crave. Instead, people gather in the church to speak to God, and to be spoken to by Him, in soberly straightforward (though often very beautiful) English. Again and again they are reminded that there is but one Mediator between God and man, Jesus Christ. None other matters; so none other is called upon. The one relevant fact is His verdict upon us, and it is by faith in Him alone that we gain mercy at the time of judgment. All who stand in the church are naked before Him together, exposed in public sight. And so they say, using the first-person singular but using it together, O God, make speed to save me; O Lord, make haste to help me.

Cranmer and his Protestant allies were forced to compromise with Catholic bishops who still held power in the House of Lords. The final form the BCP took was not what either the Protestants nor the Catholics wanted. Historian Albert Pollard wrote that it was "neither Roman nor Zwinglian; still less was it Calvinistic, and for this reason mainly it has been described as Lutheran."

== Drafting and authorisation ==
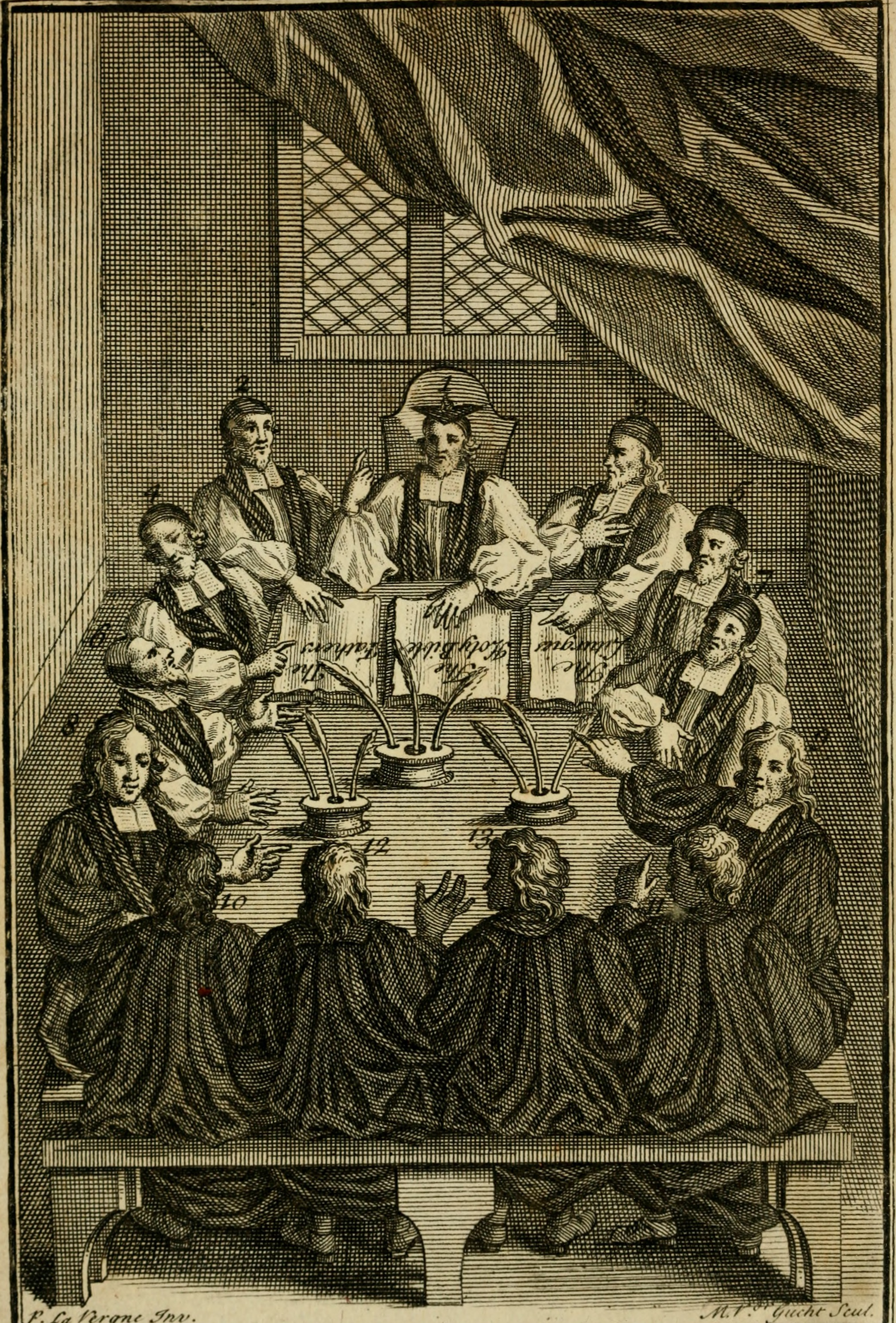
The compilers of the first Book of Common Prayer in Anthony Sparrow's A Rationale, or Practical Exposition of the Book of Common-Prayer

While Henry was king, the English language was gradually introduced into services alongside Latin. The English-language Great Bible was authorised for use in 1538. Priests were required to read from it during services. The earliest English-language service of the Church of England was the Exhortation and Litany. Published in 1544, it was no mere translation from the Latin. Its Protestant character is made clear by the drastic reduction in the invocation of saints, compressing what had been the major part into three petitions. The litany was included in the first Book of Common Prayer.

Only after the death of Henry VIII and the accession of Edward VI in 1547 could revision proceed faster. The Sacrament Act 1547 introduced the first major reform of the Mass. In 1548, pursuant to the act, a liturgical text was published in the form of a booklet titled, The Order of the Communion. This English text was to be added to the Latin Mass. It allowed for lay people to receive communion under both kinds, a departure from the Catholic Church's practice since the 13th century of giving the laity bread only. The Order of the Communion was incorporated into the new prayer book largely unchanged.

While the English people were becoming accustomed to the new Communion service, Cranmer and his colleagues were working on a complete English-language prayer book. Cranmer is "credited [with] the overall job of editorship and the overarching structure of the book"; though, he borrowed and adapted material from other sources. He relied heavily on the Sarum rite and the traditional service books (Missal, Manual, Pontifical and Breviary) as well as from the English primers used by the laity. Other Christian liturgical traditions also influenced Cranmer, including Greek Orthodox and Mozarabic texts. These latter rites had the advantage of being catholic but not Roman Catholic. Cardinal Quiñones' revision of the daily office was also a resource. He borrowed much from German sources, particularly from work commissioned by Hermann von Wied, Archbishop of Cologne; and also from Andreas Osiander (to whom he was related by marriage). The Church Order of Brandenburg and Nuremberg was partly the work of the latter. Many phrases are characteristic of the German reformer Martin Bucer, the Italian Peter Martyr (who was staying with Cranmer at the time he was finalising drafts) or of his chaplain, Thomas Becon.

Early in the draft process, bishops and theologians completed questionnaires on liturgical theology. In September 1548, bishops and senior clergy met at Chertsey Abbey and then later at Windsor and agreed that "the service of the church ought to be in the mother tongue." These meetings were likely the final steps in a longer process of composition and revision. There is no evidence that the book was ever approved by the Convocations of Canterbury and York. In December 1548, the traditionalist and Protestant bishops debated the prayer book's eucharistic theology in the House of Lords. Despite conservative opposition, Parliament passed the Act of Uniformity on 21 January 1549, and the newly authorised Book of Common Prayer was required to be in use by Whitsunday, 9 June.

== Content ==
The BCP replaced the several regional Latin liturgical uses (such as the Use of Sarum, the Use of York and the Use of Hereford) with an English-language liturgy. It was far less complicated than the older system, which required multiple books. The prayer book had provisions for the daily offices, scripture readings for Sundays and holy days, and services for communion, public baptism, confirmation, matrimony, visitation of the sick, burial, purification of women and Ash Wednesday. An ordinal for ordination services was added in 1550. There was also a calendar and lectionary, which meant a Bible and a Psalter were the only other books required by a priest.

=== Liturgical calendar ===
The prayer book preserved the seasonal or temporale calendar of the traditional church year almost unchanged. The church year started with Advent and was followed by Christmas and the Epiphany season. Ash Wednesday began the season of Lent and was followed by Holy Week, the Easter season, Ascensiontide, Whitsun, and Trinity Sunday. Before the Reformation, Wednesdays and Fridays were station days. In the prayer book, the 1544 Litany was used and Holy Communion celebrated on these days.

The prayer book also included the sanctorale or calendar of saints with collects and scripture readings appropriate for the day. However, it was reduced from 181 to 25 days. Only New Testament saints were commemorated, with the exception of All Saints' Day. Other feasts, such as the Assumption and Corpus Christi, were removed. Cranmer opposed praying to saints in hopes they might intercede for the living, but he did believe the saints were role models. For this reason, collects that invoked saints were replaced by new ones that only honoured them. The following saints were commemorated:

- Circumcision of Christ, Epiphany and conversion of St. Paul in January
- Purification of the Virgin Mary and St. Matthias in February
- Annunciation in March
- St. Mark the Evangelist in April
- St. Philip and St. James in May
- St. Barnabas, the Nativity of St. John the Baptist, and St. Peter in June
- St. Mary Magdalene and St. James the Apostle in July
- St. Bartholomew the Apostle in August
- St. Matthew and Michael and All Angels in September
- St. Luke the Evangelist and St. Simon and St. Jude in October
- All Saints' Day and St. Andrew the Apostle in November
- St. Thomas the Apostle, St. Stephen, St. John the Evangelist, and Holy Innocents Day in December

The calendar included what is now called the lectionary, which specified the parts of the Bible to be read at each service. For Cranmer, the main purpose of the liturgy was to familiarise people with the Bible. He wanted a congregation to read through the whole Bible in a year. The scripture readings for the daily office followed lectio continua. For Morning and Evening Prayer, the lessons did not change if it was a saints' day. The readings for Holy Communion did change if it was a feast day. This became a problem when a moveable feast fell on the same day as a fixed feast, but the prayer book provided no instructions for determining which feast to celebrate. Directions for solving this issue were not added to the BCP until the 1662 prayer book.

=== Morning and evening prayer ===
Cranmer's work of simplification and revision was also applied to the daily offices, which were reduced to Morning and Evening Prayer. Cranmer hoped these would also serve as a daily form of prayer to be used by the laity, thus replacing both the late medieval lay observation of the Latin Hours of the Virgin and its English equivalent, the Primer. This simplification was anticipated by the work of Cardinal Quiñones, a Spanish Franciscan, in his abortive revision of the Roman Breviary published in 1537. Cranmer took up Quiñones's principle that everything should be sacrificed to secure continuity in singing the Psalter and reading the Bible. His first draft, produced during Henry's reign, retained the traditional seven distinct canonical hours of Office prayer. His second draft, produced during Edward's reign, reduced the offices to only two, but Latin was retained for everything except the Lord's Prayer and the lessons.

The 1549 book established a rigorously biblical cycle of readings for Morning and Evening Prayer and a Psalter to be read consecutively throughout each month. A chapter from the Old Testament and the New Testament were read at each service. Both offices had a canticle after each reading. For Morning Prayer, the Te Deum or Benedicite followed the Old Testament reading and the Benedictus followed the New Testament reading. At Evening Prayer, the Magnificat and Nunc dimittis were sung. On Sundays, Wednesdays and Fridays, Cranmer's litany was to follow Morning Prayer.

Clergy were required to say both Morning and Evening Prayer daily. If this requirement was followed, a clergyman would have read the entire Old Testament once a year. He would have read the New Testament three times a year.

=== Holy Communion ===
==== Medieval Mass ====
Before the Reformation, the Eucharist was called the Mass. The Roman Catholic Church believed the Mass was a sacrifice—the same sacrifice of Christ on the cross—and a means of grace in which forgiveness, salvation and healing were obtained. It was believed that the benefits of Christ's sacrifice were applied not only to those who received communion but also to those who witnessed the Mass and those who were prayed for during the service.

The entire service was said in Latin. The priest offered and consecrated bread and wine on a stone altar while reciting a long prayer known as the canon of the Mass. When the priest said the words of institution, the bread and wine miraculously became the body and blood of Christ according to the doctrine of transubstantiation (see also real presence of Christ in the Eucharist). The priest then elevated the sacramental bread (called the host) so that the congregation could see and adore it as Christ's body. In the name of the congregation, the priest then offered the consecrated bread and wine to God, praying that God would accept the sacrifice for the living worshippers and the faithful dead. The priest then consumed the offering.

Since laypeople only received communion once a year at Easter, they were mainly spectators performing eucharistic adoration. For most of the Mass, congregants prayed privately, often with rosaries, a book of hours, or at side altars dedicated to particular saints. Before receiving communion, laypeople were supposed to fast and confess their sins to a priest who assigned penance and then pronounced absolution. When receiving the sacrament, a communicant knelt while the priest placed the host directly into their mouth, so their hands would not touch it. By custom, laypeople were only given the host to eat; only clergy received communion under both kinds.

==== Reformed service ====
The new service was titled "The Supper of the Lord and the Holy Communion, commonly called the Mass" as a compromise with conservatives. Besides the name, it also preserved much of the medieval structure of the Mass (stone altars, vestments, etc.). Nevertheless, the BCP liturgy was a "radical" departure from traditional worship in that it "eliminated almost everything that had till then been central to lay Eucharistic piety". The sacrifice of the Mass was replaced with a Protestant service of thanksgiving and spiritual communion with Christ. The notions of transubstantiation and eucharistic adoration were suppressed. In the new liturgy, the priest faced the congregation instead of turning his back to them. The service was to now be in English, and laypeople were to be encouraged to participate by receiving communion under both kinds frequently.

The first part of the service was known as ante-Communion. It progressed as follows:

- Lord's Prayer
- Collect for Purity
- the day's introit psalm sung by clerks
- Kyrie sung by clerks
- Gloria sung by clerks
- collect of the day
- collect for the king
- Epistle and Gospel readings assigned for the day
- Nicene Creed sung
- sermon or reading from the First Book of Homilies

The second part of the service began with two exhortations. These exhortations describe the body and blood of Christ as a pledge and remembrance of Christ's love. Those who worthily receive the sacrament spiritually feed on Christ and are united with him as children of God. Worthy reception means having sorrow for sins, charity toward the world, and repentance. Those who receive unworthily are warned that they eat and drink their own damnation. The teaching that communicants "spiritually eat the flesh of Christ" was a direct attack on the doctrine of real presence.

The offertory then follows. In the medieval rite, the offertory was when the priest offered the bread and wine to be consecrated as the body and blood of Christ. In the BCP, the offertory was a collection of scriptures about generosity and almsgiving, such as Matthew 6:19–20, to be said or sung while members of the congregation moved to the choir or chancel to place monetary donations in a "poor men's box". At this point, the service could only continue if there were people present willing to receive communion with the priest. If no one was willing, the service ended without communion. (Note: Weekly communion was uncommon in the Church of England until the Victorian Era.) The Reformers hoped to establish the practice of weekly congregational communion, but laypeople were reluctant to participate that often.

Those receiving communion remained in the chancel near the altar for the rest of the service. If there were communicants, the priest laid on the altar enough bread and wine. According to Anglican theologian Charles Hefling, whether the priest actually offered the bread and wine to God "is debatable. Analogy with the Mass would suggest that he does, but nothing in the prayers or rubrics says so." Hefling goes on to say the offertory sentences refer to almsgiving and "cannot, without special pleading, be referred directly to the bread and wine."

After the offertory comes the sacramental prayer. It began with the preface and Sanctus. The priest then turned to the altar to say or sing a long prayer that was based on the Sarum rite's canon of the Mass. The canon was divided into three parts: intercession, consecration, and memorial/oblation. Part one was a bidding prayer for the king, clergy, and people (including the dead). (Note: "WE commend unto thy mercy (O Lord) all other thy servants which are departed hence from us with the sign of faith, and now do rest in the sleep of peace: grant unto them, we beseech thee, they mercy and everlasting peace; and that, at the day of the general resurrection, we and all they which be of the mystical body of thy Son, may altogether be set on his right hand, and hear that his most joyful voice: Come unto me, O ye that be blessed of my Father, and possess the kingdom, which is prepared for you from the beginning of the world.") Thanks was also given for the saints in heaven. (Note: "And here do we give unto thee most high praise, and hearty thanks, for the wonderful grace and virtue declared in all thy saints, from the beginning of the world; and chiefly in the glorious and most blessed Virgin Mary, mother of thy Son Jesu Christ our Lord and God; and in the holy Patriarchs, Prophets, Apostles, and Martyrs, whose examples (O Lord) and stedfastness in thy faith, and keeping thy holy commandments, grant us to follow.") This replaced the traditional "bidding of the bedes" that had occurred after the sermon.

Part two of the canon was the consecration. It began with a recitation of Christ's death on the cross and the Last Supper. In order to redeem sinners, God gave his son, Jesus Christ, to be crucified. Christ's self-sacrifice was powerful enough to make satisfaction for all of humanity's sins. Before he died, Christ established the Lord's Supper as a perpetual memorial of his death. (Note: "O GOD, heavenly Father, which of thy tender mercy diddest give thine only Son Jesu Christ to suffer death upon the cross for our redemption; who made there (by his one oblation once offered) a full, perfect, and sufficient sacrifice, oblation, and satisfaction, for the sins of the whole world; and did institute, and in his holy Gospel command us to celebrate a perpetual memory of that his precious death, until his coming again".) The priest then made the sign of the cross over the bread and wine while petitioning God to do the following:

Hear us (O merciful Father) we beseech thee; and with thy Holy Spirit and Word vouchsafe to bl+ess and sanc+tify these thy gifts and creatures of bread and wine, that they may be unto us the Body and Blood of thy most dearly beloved Son Jesus Christ (emphasis added)

This petition was not meant to imply that a transformation occurred in the elements. For Cranmer to bless something meant only to set it apart for a holy purpose. In saying "unto us", Cranmer meant the bread and wine would represent the body and blood, which can only be received spiritually. After the petition, the words of institution were spoken, but the rubric immediately after forbade any elevation of the sacrament. For Reformers, elevation was unacceptable because it implied that the elements changed after consecration and invited congregants to engage in eucharistic adoration. While the sacramental bread and wine were consecrated for a holy purpose, they were not to be objects of worship.

The third part of the canon is the memorial and oblation. The priest prays, "we thy humble servants do celebrate and make ... the memorial which thy Son hath willed us to make; having in remembrance his blessed passion, mighty resurrection, and glorious ascension". The memorial is described as a "sacrifice of praise" for the benefits of Christ's death and resurrection, especially forgiveness of sins. The priest then, in the name of the congregation, prays:

And here we offer and present unto thee (O Lord) ourself, our souls and bodies, to be a reasonable, holy, and lively sacrifice unto thee; humbly beseeching thee, that whosoever shall be partakers of this holy Communion may worthily receive the most precious Body and Blood of thy Son Jesus Christ; and be fulfilled with thy grace and heavenly benediction, and made one body with thy Son Jesu Christ, that he may dwell in them, and they in him.

The canon closes with an acknowledgment of the congregation's unworthiness to offer any sacrifice to God; nevertheless, God is asked to accept it as their duty and service. This sacrifice is not Christ nor his body and blood because, in the words of Charles Hefling, "Christ has been offered already, by Christ himself." Historian Diarmaid MacCulloch argues that for Thomas Cranmer "there is really nothing which humanity can offer God, except itself." Hefling elaborates on this point:

Why there is no adoration or oblation of the sacramental bread and wine is explained, by implication, in the rite itself. It consistently expresses the relation between the Christian and Christ in terms of spiritual communion, not active confrontation, whether material or physical or sensible. If Christ is present, his presence does not make him the object of anything that anyone does. Priest and people cannot be said to offer, present, touch, or behold him. What they do is receive; what they give is thanks; and what they offer is themselves. To do so is their "bounden duty"—almost the first words of the canon, and almost the last.

The canon was followed by the Lord's Prayer. Private confession prior to the service was now optional. Instead, the priest made a general confession of sin on behalf of the whole congregation and pronounced absolution. Following the absolution, the priest said what are known as the "comfortable words", scripture passages which give assurance of Christ's mercy (taken from Matthew 11:28, John 3:16, 1 Timothy 1:15 and 1 John 2:1–2). The priest then knelt at the altar and prayed in the name of all the communicants the Prayer of Humble Access.

When administering the sacrament, the priest said "The Body of our Lord Jesus Christ, which was given for thee, preserve thy body and soul unto everlasting life" and "The Blood of our Lord Jesus Christ, which was shed for thee, preserve thy body and soul unto everlasting life", for the bread and wine respectively. Cranmer deliberately made these words ambiguous. Traditionalists would understood them as identifying the bread and wine with the body and blood of Christ, but Protestants would understand them as a prayer that the communicant might spiritually receive the body and blood of Christ by faith.

The service ended as follows:

- Agnus Dei sung by the clerks
- postcommunion sentences sung by the clerks
- prayer of thanksgiving

=== Baptism ===
In the Middle Ages, the church taught that children were born with original sin and that only baptism could remove it. Baptism was, therefore, essential to salvation. It was feared that children who died without baptism faced eternal damnation or limbo. A priest would perform an infant baptism soon after birth on any day of the week, but in cases of emergency, a midwife could baptise a child at birth. The traditional baptism service was long and repetitive. It was also spoken in Latin. The priest only spoke English when exhorting the godparents.

To Cranmer, baptism and the Eucharist were the only dominical sacraments (sacraments instituted by Christ himself) and of equal importance. Cranmer did not believe that baptism was absolutely necessary for salvation, but he did believe it was ordinarily necessary and to refuse baptism would be a rejection of God's grace. In agreement with Reformed theology, however, Cranmer believed that salvation was determined by God's unconditional election, which was predestined. If an infant was one of the elect, dying unbaptised would not affect the child's salvation. The prayer book made public baptism the norm, so a congregation could observe and be reminded of their own baptism. In cases of emergency, a private baptism could be performed at home.

Largely based on Martin Luther's baptism service, which simplified the medieval rite, the prayer book's service of public baptism maintained a traditional form and sacramental character. It also preserved some of the symbolic actions and repetitive prayers found in the medieval rite. It began at the church door with these words:

Dear beloved, forasmuch as all men be conceived and born in sin, and that no man born in sin, can enter into the kingdom of God (except he be regenerate, and born anew of water, and the holy ghost) I beseech you to call upon God the father through our Lord Jesus Christ, that of his bounteous mercy he will grant to these children that thing, which by nature they cannot have, that is to say, they may be baptized with the holy ghost, and received into Christ's holy Church, and be made lively members of the same.

The priest then said a prayer, originally composed by Luther, based on Noah's deliverance from the flood:

Almighty and everlasting God, which of thy justice didst destroy by floods of water the whole world for sin, except eight persons, whom of thy mercy (the same time) thou didst save in the Ark: And when thou didst drown in the red sea wicked king Pharaoh with all his army, yet (at the same time) thou didst lead thy people the children of Israel safely through the midst thereof: whereby thou didst figure the washing of thy holy Baptism: and by the Baptism of thy well beloved son Jesus Christ, thou didst sanctify the flood Jordan, and all other waters to this mystical washing away of sin: We beseech thee (for thy infinite mercies) that thou wilt mercifully look upon these children, and sanctify them with thy holy ghost, that by this wholesome laver of regeneration, whatsoever sin is in them, may be washed clean away, that they, being delivered from thy wrath, may be received into the ark of Christ's church, and so saved from perishing: and being fervent in spirit, steadfast in faith, joyful through hope, rooted in charity, may ever serve thee: And finally attain to everlasting life, with all thy holy and chosen people. This grant us we beseech the, for Jesus Christ's sake our Lord. Amen.

The priest then made the sign of the cross on the infant's forehead and chest as a token of faith and obedience to Christ. The congregation then prayed "Receive [these infants] (o Lord) as thou hast promised by thy well beloved son, ... that these infants may enjoy the everlasting benediction of thy heavenly washing, and may come to the eternal kingdom which thou hast promised, by Christ our Lord." The priest then performed a minor exorcism (Cranmer reduced the multiple exorcisms in the medieval rite to just one) saying, "I command thee, unclean spirit, in the name of the father, of the son, and of the holy ghost, that thou come out, and depart from these infants."

The theme of God receiving the child continued with the gospel reading (Mark 10) and the minister's exhortation, which was probably intended to repudiate Anabaptist teachings against infant baptism. The congregation then recited the Lord's Prayer and the Apostles' Creed. The medieval service made reference to the infant's personal faith — a relic of ancient times when adult converts were routinely baptised. Cranmer replaced these with an emphasis on the faith of the congregation: "Almighty and everlasting God, heavenly father, we give thee humble thanks, that thou hast vouchsafed to call us to knowledge of thy grace, and faith in thee: Increase and confirm this faith in us evermore".

At this point, the service moved inside the church near the baptismal font. Baptismal vows were made by the godparents on behalf of the child. The devil, the world and the flesh were forsaken. Then the godparents affirmed belief in the Apostles' Creed. After this, the child was baptised by triple immersion and dressed in traditional white baptismal clothing, with the priest saying:

Take this white vesture for a token of the innocence, which by God's grace in this holy sacrament of Baptism, is given unto thee: and for a sign whereby thou art admonished, so long as thou livest, to give thyself to innocence of living, that, after this transitory life, thou mayest be partaker of the life everlasting. Amen.

The priest then anointed the child with chrism oil, saying:

Almighty God the father of our lord Jesus Christ, who hath regenerate thee by water and the holy ghost, and hath given unto thee remission of all thy sins: he vouchsafe to anoint thee with the unction of his holy spirit, and bring thee to the inheritance of everlasting life. Amen.

The rite concluded with an exhortation to the godparents on their duties toward the child. The prayer book also included a monthly rite of changing and blessing the water in the baptismal font. This sequence of prayers derives from the Mozarabic Rite, and it begins with:

O most merciful god our saviour Jesu Christ, who hast ordained the element of water for the regeneration of thy faithful people, upon whom, being baptised in the river of Jordan, the holy ghost came down in the likeness of a dove: Send down we beseech thee the same thy holy spirit to assist us, and to be present at this our invocation of thy holy name: Sanctify + this fountain of baptism, thou that art the sanctifier of all things, that by the power of thy word, all those that shall he baptized therein, may be spiritually regenerated, and made the children of everlasting adoption. Amen.

=== Confirmation and catechism ===
The Book of Common Prayer also included a service for confirmation and a catechism. In Catholicism, confirmation was a sacrament believed to give grace for the Christian life after baptism and was always performed by a bishop.

Cranmer saw confirmation as an opportunity for children who had been baptised as infants to personally affirm their faith. At confirmation, children would accept for themselves the baptismal vows made by godparents on their behalf. Before being confirmed, children would be taught the catechism in church before evening prayer on Sunday. The catechism included the Apostles' Creed, the Ten Commandments, the Lord's Prayer, and a discussion of the individual's duty to God and neighbor. Everyone was required to know these in order to receive Communion.

The confirmation service followed the Sarum rite. The bishop prayed that the confirmand would be strengthened with the "inward unction of thy Holy Ghost". Afterwards, the bishop made the sign of the cross on the child's forehead and laid his hands on the head. The only significant change to the traditional rite was that the confirmand was not anointed with chrism oil.

=== Marriage ===
The marriage service was largely a translation of the Sarum rite. The first part of the service took place in the nave of the church and included an opening pastoral discourse, a time to declare objections or impediments to the marriage, and the marriage vows. The couple then moved to the chancel for prayers and to receive Holy Communion.

The prayer book rejected the idea that marriage was a sacrament while also repudiating the common medieval belief that celibacy was holier than married life. The prayer book called marriage a "holy estate" that "Christ adorned and beautified with his presence, and first miracle that he wrought in Cana of Galilee." Sacerdotal elements in the rite were removed, and the emphasis was on the groom and bride as the true ministers of the wedding. The wedding ring was retained, but it was not blessed. Cranmer believed that blessings applied to people not things, so the couple was blessed.

The Sarum rite stated there were two purposes for marriage: procreation of children and avoidance of fornication. Cranmer added a third purpose: "for the mutual society, help, and comfort, that the one ought to have of the other, both in prosperity and adversity." In the Sarum rite, the husband vowed "to have and to hold from this day forward, for better, for worse, for richer, for poorer, in sickness, and in health, till death us depart." Cranmer added the words "to love and to cherish" (for the wife "to love, cherish, and obey").

=== Visitation of the sick ===
The office for the visitation of the sick was a shortened version of the Sarum rite. It featured prayers for healing, a long exhortation by the priest and a reminder that the sick person needed to examine their conscience and repent of sin while there was still time. The rite had a penitential tone, which was reinforced by the option to make private confession to the priest who would then grant absolution. This was the only form for absolving individuals provided in the prayer book and was to be used for all other private confessions. The visitation rite also included anointing of the sick, but a distinction was made between the visible oil and the inward anointing of the Holy Spirit.

Communion of the sick was also provided for in the prayer book. While the Catholic practice of reserving the sacrament was forbidden, the priest could celebrate a shortened Communion service at the sick person's house or the sacrament could be brought directly from a Communion service at the parish church to be administered to the sick.

In the medieval rite, there were prayers to saints asking for their intercession on behalf of the sick. These prayers were not included in the prayer book liturgy. Other changes made included the removal of symbolic gestures and sacramentals. For example, the prayer book rite made anointing of the sick optional with only one anointing on the forehead or chest. In the old rite, the eyes, ears, lips, limbs and heart were anointed to symbolise, in the words of historian Eamon Duffy, "absolution and surrender of all the sick person's senses and faculties as death approached".

=== Burial ===
The Order for the Burial of the Dead was focused on the resurrection of Jesus as a pledge and guarantee of the resurrection and glorification of all believers. It included a procession through the church yard, the burial, a service in church and Holy Communion. There were remnants of prayer for the dead and the Requiem Mass, such as the provision for celebrating Communion at a funeral. At the same time, much of the traditional funeral rites were removed. For example, the service in the house and all other processions were eliminated.

=== Ordinal ===
When first published, the prayer book lacked an ordinal, the book containing the rites for the ordination of deacons and priests and the consecration of bishops. The 1550 ordinal was published in March 1550 to fill this need, replacing the pontifical from Sarum practice. The ordinal adopted the Protestant doctrine of sola scriptura and has ordination candidates affirm they are "persuaded that the holy scriptures contain sufficiently all doctrine required of necessity for eternal salvation through faith in Jesus Christ". The ordinal was based on work by Martin Bucer.

The services were also simplified. For Cranmer and other reformers, the essential part of ordination was the laying on hands with prayer. In the traditional service, the ordination candidate would be anointed, put on Mass vestments and receive the eucharistic vessels to symbolise his new role. In the prayer book, however, the only thing the candidate was given was a Bible from which he would teach.

== Vestments ==
Priests still wore vestments. For Holy Communion, they wore a white alb and cope. For the services of morning and evening prayer, baptism and burial, priests wore the surplice. Bishops wore a rochet, surplice or alb, and a cope. When being consecrated, bishops were to wear a black chimere over a white rochet. This requirement offended John Hooper, who initially refused to wear the offensive garments to become bishop of Gloucester. His refusal launched the first vestments controversy in the Church of England.

== Music ==
The Latin Mass and daily office traditionally used monophonic chant for music. While Lutheran churches in Germany continued to use chant in their services, other Protestant churches in Europe were replacing chant with exclusive psalmody. The English reformers followed the Lutheran example by retaining chant for their new vernacular services. There was, however, a demand to make chant less elaborate so that the liturgical text could be heard clearly. This had been a common concern for humanists such as Erasmus. Cranmer preferred simple plainsong that was "functional, comprehensible to and even performable by any persevering member of a congregation".

The English litany was published along with simple plainsong based on the chant used in the Sarum rite. When the BCP was published, there was initially no music because it would take time to replace the church's body of Latin music. Theologian Gordon Jeanes writes that "Musically the greatest loss was of hymnody, reflecting Cranmer's own acknowledged lack of compositional skill."

John Merbecke's Book of Common Prayer noted, published in 1550, also used simple plainsong musical settings. Merbecke's work was intended to be sung by the "singing men" of cathedrals and collegiate churches, not by the congregation. In smaller parish churches, every part of the liturgy would have been spoken. Merbecke's musical settings experienced a revival in popularity during the 19th century, when his settings were revised to be sung by congregations. Some of those settings have remained in use into the 20th century.

== Reception ==
The 1549 Book of Common Prayer was a temporary compromise between reformers and conservatives. It provided Protestants with a service free from what they considered superstition, while maintaining the traditional structure of the Mass.

It was criticised by Protestants for being too susceptible to Roman Catholic re-interpretation. Conservative clergy took advantage of loopholes in the 1549 prayer book to make the new liturgy as much like the old Latin Mass as possible, including elevating the Eucharist. The conservative Bishop Gardiner endorsed the prayer book while in prison, and historian Eamon Duffy notes that many lay people treated the prayer book "as an English missal". Nevertheless, it was unpopular in the parishes of Devon and Cornwall where, along with severe social problems, its introduction was one of the causes of the Prayer Book Rebellion in the summer of that year, partly because many Cornish people lacked sufficient English to understand it.

Protestants considered the book too traditional. Martin Bucer identified 60 problems with the prayer book, and the Italian Peter Martyr Vermigli provided his own complaints. Shifts in Eucharistic theology between 1548 and 1552 also made the prayer book unsatisfactory—during that time English Protestants achieved a consensus rejecting any real bodily presence of Christ in the Eucharist. Some influential Protestants such as Vermigli defended Zwingli's symbolic view of the Eucharist. Less radical Protestants such as Bucer and Cranmer advocated for a spiritual presence in the sacrament. Cranmer himself had already adopted receptionist views on the Lord's Supper. (Note: MacCulloch (1996, pp. 461, 492) quotes Cranmer as explaining "And therefore in the book of the holy communion, we do not pray that the creatures of bread and wine may be the body and blood of Christ; but that they may be to us the body and blood of Christ" and also "I do as plainly speak as I can, that Christ's body and blood be given to us in deed, yet not corporally and carnally, but spiritually and effectually.") In April 1552, a new Act of Uniformity authorised a revised Book of Common Prayer to be used in worship by 1 November.

Centuries later, the 1549 prayer book would become popular among Anglo-Catholics. Nevertheless, Cranmer biographer Diarmaid MacCulloch comments that this would have "surprised and probably distressed Cranmer". Non-jurors of the early eighteenth century debated the significance of the prayer book with the Usager faction reinstating many of its usages within their worship. The Scottish Episcopal Church would occasionally adopt the 1549 Communion office rather than the current version of the 1662 prayer book during the early 18th century until the creation of native liturgies in 1718.

== See also ==
- Anglican doctrine
