= Edwardine Ordinals =

Two 16th-century Church of England liturgical books

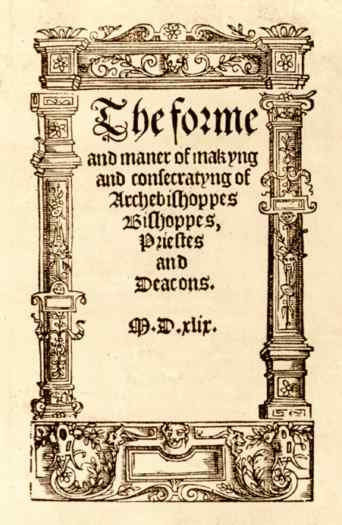
Title page of the 1550 Edwardine Ordinal

The Edwardine Ordinals (Note: The eponymous adjective Edwardine refers to Edward VI, the Tudor king of England under whom the ordinals were produced. While Edwardine is the typical spelling when collectively referencing the 1550 and 1552 ordinals, Edwardian may also be used (though this latter spelling typically refers to Edward VII). Ordinal itself is an anachronism with regards to the Edwardine Ordinals, as the word was not first applied to such texts until the 17th century. Additionally, "Edwardine Ordinal" may refer to either the 1550 or 1552 ordinals independent of one another.) are two ordinals primarily written by Thomas Cranmer as influenced by Martin Bucer and first published under Edward VI, the first in 1550 and the second in 1552, for the Church of England. Both liturgical books were intended to replace the ordination liturgies contained within medieval pontificals in use before the English Reformation.

The 1550 ordinal was authorized the year following the first Book of Common Prayer's introduction. The 1552 ordinal's introduction coincided with that of the second Book of Common Prayer. Both prayer books were also largely prepared by Cranmer. The ordinals provided the basis for most Anglican ordination rites until the 20th century and contributed to the development of the Anglican priesthood from "sacerdotal" and "intercessory" into a "preaching, catechizing, and protestant ministry". They also formed the basis for both the Vestiarian Controversy and, much later, some of the debate over the validity of Anglican holy orders and the subsequent 1896 papal bull Apostolicae curae where they were declared "absolutely null and utterly void" by the Catholic Church.

== Medieval ordination liturgies ==
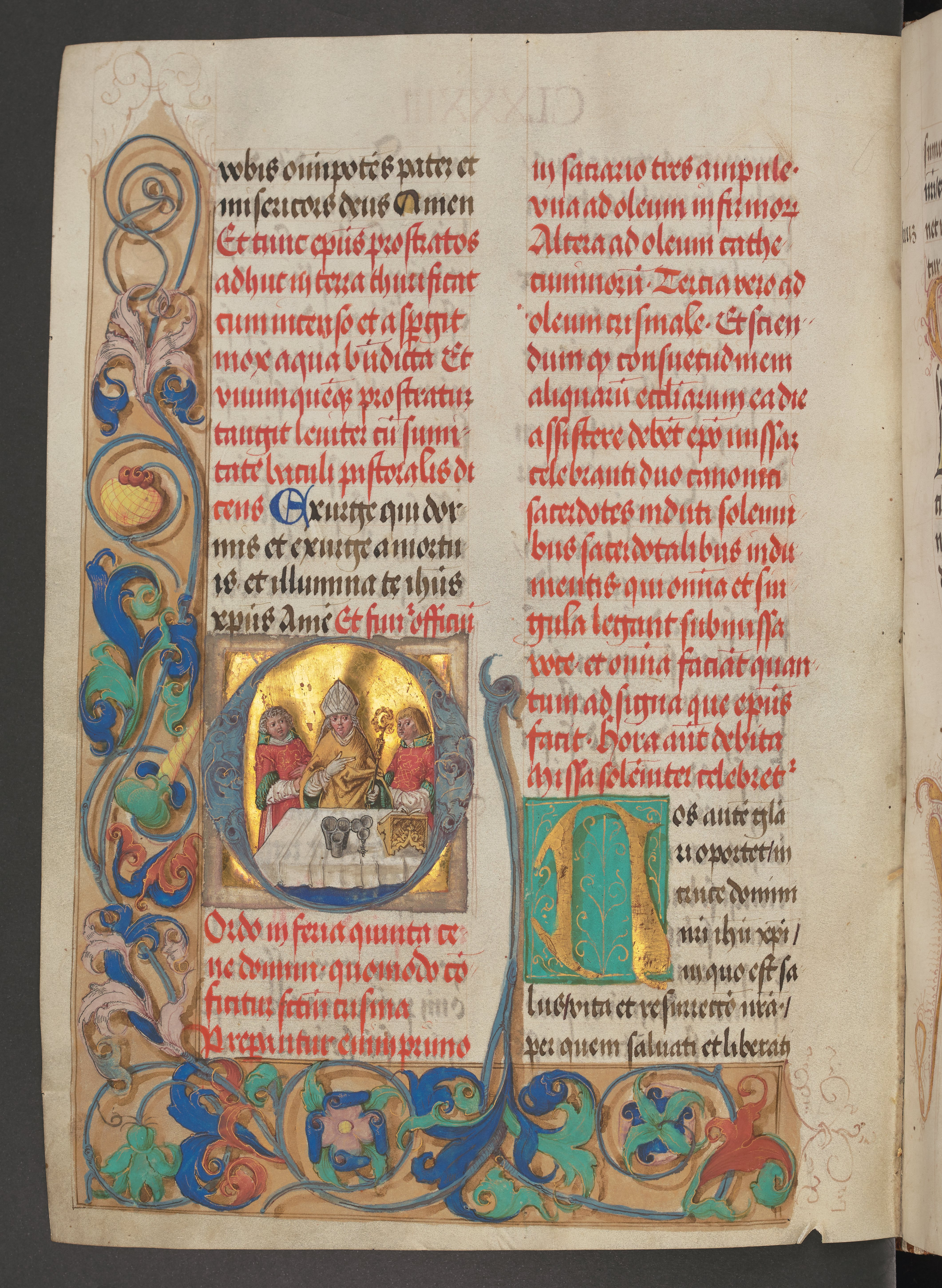
An early 16th-century illuminated Roman Pontifical

The word ordinal in the medieval period, rather than applying to a liturgical book containing the rites of ordination, was the title given to a text associated with the recitation of the canonical hours that was eventually assimilated into the breviary. While it is the typical modern name in reference to texts containing ordinations, it was probably not until John Bramhall's 1636 The Consecration and Succession of Protestant Bishops Justified that ordinal was used in this context.

Prior to the English Reformation, the liturgies of ordination–for the conferral of holy orders–in the Latin liturgical rites were contained within several versions the pontifical, most prominently the Roman Pontificals of the Roman Rite and the Sarum Pontifical of the Sarum Use. These ordination liturgies were a matter of debate between Rome and Reformers; 17th-century scholar Jean Morin summarized the Catholic Church's position that the contemporary Roman Pontificals "omit[ted] nothing that was present in the older" pontificals, while Anglicans have suggested that the laying on of hands by consecrators were variously deleted or obscured by other rituals.

The Gallican ordination liturgies, which had influenced broader Roman Rite practices in the early medieval period, were ritually complex but also possessed clear moments of ordination. For priestly ordination, the bishop laying of hands on a candidate would say it was "the blessing of the presbyterate". The anointing of a priest's hand with chrism appeared within Gallican and Roman liturgies, including the 11th-century Leofric Missal.

As early as the 10th century, English pontificals would build upon Gallican practices with a litany that accompanied ordination liturgies. These medieval texts–besides containing the rituals for ordinating deacons, priests, bishops–also included means for conferring minor orders such as the subdiaconate. Medieval pontificals gradually included and emphasized the conferral of the vestments and other items associated with their new offices, among these being stoles, patens, and chalices, in a custom known as the "tradition of elements" (Latin: traditio instrumentorum). In 1439, this practice was identified by Pope Eugene IV as an essential part of ordination. These medieval practices and their convoluted nature–duplicated actions were common within the ordination Masses–were the result of Roman and Gallican rites being conflated with local permutations. It was not uncommon for elements to be inserted into ordination liturgies that were associated with neither the formal texts nor the liturgical actions.

== First Edwardine Ordinal ==
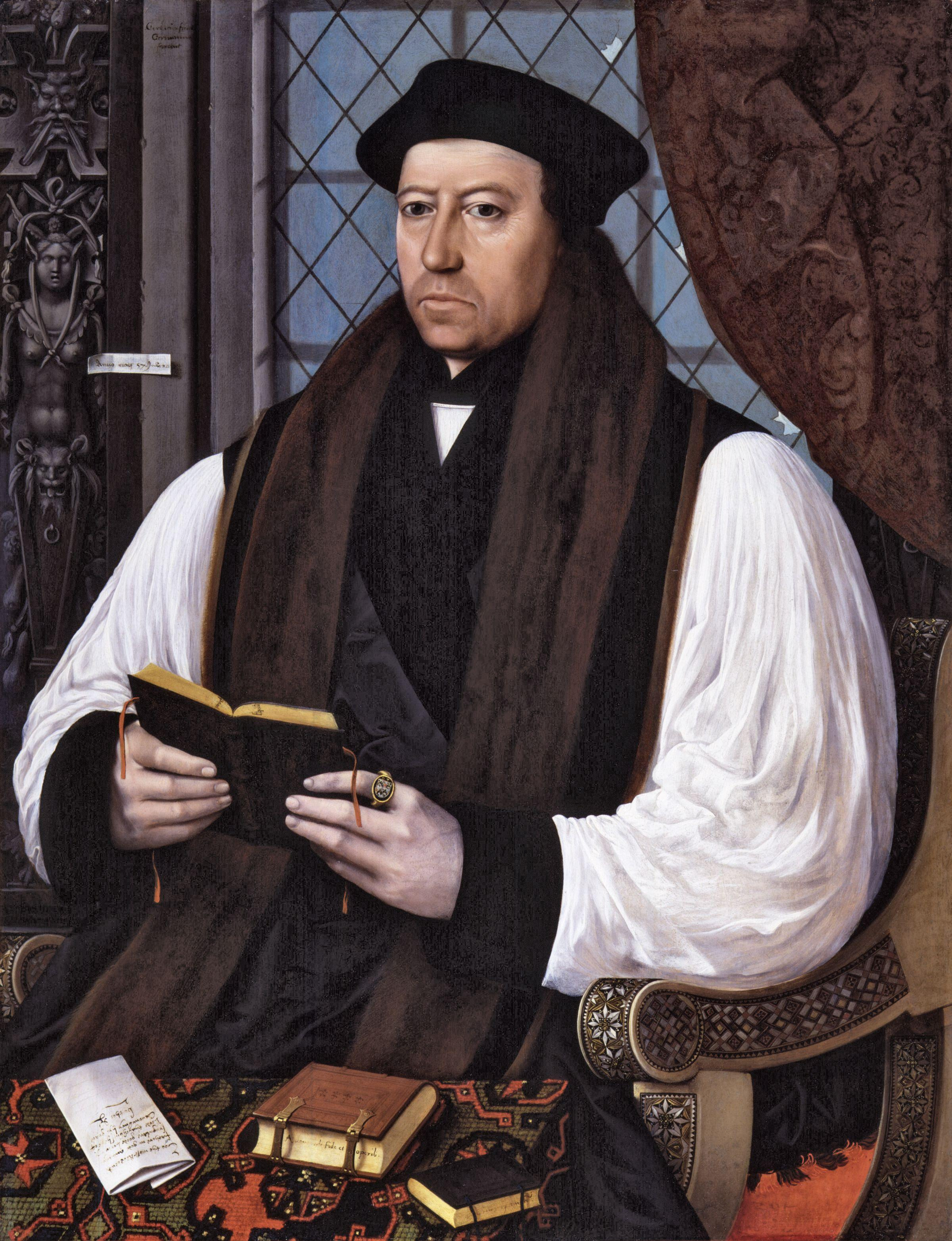
Thomas Cranmer, Archbishop of Canterbury

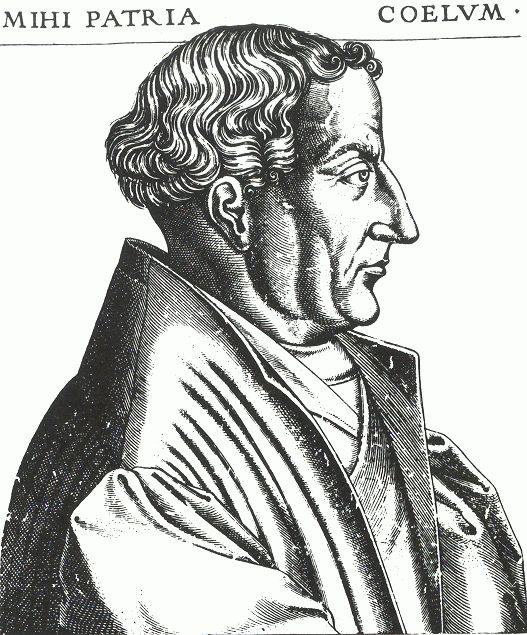
Martin Bucer, German reformer and liturgist

With the English Reformation and independence of the Church of England from Rome, Henry VIII mandated that the oath of obedience to the pope be deleted from the Sarum and Roman pontificals still in use; these modifications can be seen in some preserved copies of these texts. (Note: Not all pontificals were defaced in accordance with Henry VIII's declaration. As they were never printed and were the property of the bishops rather than parishes, pontificals were never called in and continued to be used at the discretion of the bishops. One rite from pontificals, for Confirmation, was included in the 1549 prayer book.) In 1547, a meeting between parliament and convocation resulted in an act of convocation that permitted clerical marriage in the Church of England. However, no wholly revised ordinal immediately accompanied the 1549 Book of Common Prayer and the Church of England continued to use the Sarum ordination form for the first year of the prayer book's authorization.

German reformer Martin Bucer–who had been exiled to England in 1548–drew on the discussions that had already occurred among his fellow reformed countrymen in Germany regarding the role of the priesthood and compiled an ordination liturgy in Latin, De ordinatione legitima ministrorum ecclesiæ reuocanda, for the English reformers to study. Thomas Cranmer, the Archbishop of Canterbury and liturgist behind the 1549 prayer book, would perform an ordination with Nicholas Ridley, the Bishop of London and Westminster, at St Paul's Cathedral in 1549 according to the ritual soon to be legally requested.

The authorization and production of an ordinal was formally requested in a House of Lords bill on 8 January 1550 and authorized by an act of Parliament on 31 January that mandated its preparation under the authority of the king "before the first day of April" of 1550. A commission was set up to authorize a form for the new ordinal. Nicholas Heath, a moderate Catholic and the Bishop of Worcester, is the only person known to have been on the commission; Heath was imprisoned for 18 months for refusing to sign off on the ritual form produced for the commission. This form, largely arranged by Cranmer, was derived from Bucer's work with additions that could be traced to Martin Luther and featured some "personal creative contribution" from Cranmer. The ordinal was completed and published by 25 March that year, (Note: Because of its publication before 25 March, its title page is dated to 1549.) with the liturgy accompanied by a literary preface. The authorized ordinal was printed by Richard Grafton, bound separately from the prayer book, under the full name A forme and maner of makyng and consecratyng of Archebisshopes, Bisshopes, Priestes and Deacons. (Note: The same year as the first ordinal's approval and publication, John Merbecke published his The Booke of Common Praier Noted, a highly-successful musical setting of the 1549 prayer book that drew on a common 14th-century Folk Mass; Merbecke's text emphasized the role of the congregation.)

The Sarum ordination liturgies were the foundations of this ordinal, as the revisers did not have the means to review the precedents to the contemporary Sarum usage. As such, the 1550 ordinal was largely a simplification of those rituals with an intent to emphasize the imposition of hands and associate prayers, including the ancient hymn Veni Creator Spiritus. Additionally, the minor orders were wholly deleted in favor of what were deemed the "necessary" orders of deacon, priest, and bishop. According to the ordinal's preface, this was based on an interpretation of Scripture and ancient tradition that established a "existence of the threefold ministry" during the Apostolic age. The examination of candidates, which in the Sarum Use had been exclusive to episcopal consecrations, was also extended to the candidates for the diaconate and priesthood.

The essential elements of the ordination liturgy were interpolated into a Holy Communion office that included Cranmer's litany. As with the medieval ordination Masses, these elements were dispersed throughout the 1550 ordinal liturgies with less attention to cohesion than inclusion of the actions; there is a different ordering of share events within the three ordination rites relative to the Holy Communion office. The 1550 ordinal retained the practice of giving a newly ordained priest certain items, with the addition of a Bible in addition to paten and chalice.

Laypersons could and would attend ordinations, with an opportunity for those gathered to "declare 'any impediment'" and give negative endorsement of the candidates to prevent their ordination. Among the requirements for an ordinand present in the 1550 ordinal were that they be educated and intimately connected with their ministerial community. This requirement proved a challenge among clergy emanating from Wales and the linguistic and cultural frontiers on the border between England and Wales–particularly in the Diocese of Hereford–as many English-speaking clergy had trouble communicating with the local Welsh-speaking laity. In Ireland, the Reformation was decelerated by stalled efforts to translate and print Anglican liturgies in the country and its language. Among the instances of these was a failure to introduce the ordinal alongside a 1551 printing of the prayer book. According to research by Walter Frere published in 1896, a total of six bishops and 110 other clergy were ordained according to the 1550 ordinal.

The Catholic bishops in England did not receive the ordinal in a positive manner. Despite having accepted the 1549 prayer book, Nicholas Heath refused to accept the 1550 ordinal, as he believed that it eroded the Church of England's catholicity. He was deprived of his bishopric at Worcester and imprisoned. A similar fate befell the Catholic Stephen Gardiner.

=== Episcopal consecration ===
The ordering and contents of the 1550 form for consecrating bishops differed from both that present in the Sarum Pontifical and Bucer's Latin liturgy:

Consecration of Bishops
Sarum Pontifical (Note: Derived from a Sarum Pontifical as printed within William Maskell's Monumenta Ritualia Ecclesiae Anglicanae, Vol. III.)	Bucer's liturgy	1550 ordinal
Examination with Oath of Obedience; Officium of the day; Kyrie; Gloria in excelsis; Collect of the day; Epistle of the day; Gradual of the day	Sermon; Veni Sancte Spiritus; Psalms 40, 132, and 135; Collect of the day; Epistle of the day; Gospel of the day	Introit (Psalm 132 or 135); Kyrie (in English); Gloria in excelsis (in English); Collect of the day; Epistle of the day; Gospel of the day
Vesting of the elect; Episcopum oportet (Note: A statement regarding the duties of a bishop attributed to Isidore of Seville, likely instead originating in Celtic or Gallican practice.); Oremus dilectissimi; Litany; Imposition of hands accompanied by Gospel, simultaneous with Veni Creator Spiritus and Oremus Propitiare domine; Dominus vobiscum; Sursum corda; Gratias orgamus; Vere dignum et	Allocution; Examination; Dominus vobiscum; Oremus; Deus omnipotens, Pater domini	Presentation; King's Mandate; Oath of Supremacy; Oath of Obedience; "Brethren it is written"; Cranmer's litany; Collect; Come, Holy Spirit; Dominus vobiscum; Gratias orgamus; "Almightie God and most mercifull"
Unction of the head with oil and chrism; Hoc domine copiose; Pater sancte omnipotens; Spiritus Sanctus septiform; Antiphon (Unguentum in capite); Unction of the head with chrism; Unction of the hands	Imposition of the hands of the ordainer and presbyters; Manus Dei omnipotentis (Note: Prayer reads in full as "Manus Dei omnipotentis Patris Filii et Spiritus Sancti sit super vos, protegat et gubernet vos, ut eatis et fructum vestro ministerio quamplurimum afferatis, isque maneat in vitam æternam, amen.")	Imposition of the hands of the metropolitan and other bishops; "Take the Holy Ghost" (Note: While the ordaining of priests is accompanied by the prayer "Receive the Holy Ghost: whose sins..." as derived from John 20:22, the consecration of bishops reads "Take the Holy Ghost: and remember that thou stir up..." as derived from 2 Timothy 1:6–7.)
Blessing of staff (Sustentator human.); Tradition of staff (Accipe baculum.); Blessing of ring (Creator et conserv.); Blessing of mitre (Deus cuius provid.); Tradition of mitre (Deus qui mitrae.); Tradition of Gospels (Accipe euanglium.); Pax tibi		[Tradition of staff] "Be to the flock" (Note: The rubric in 1550 read "The Archbishop shall lay the Bible upon his neck, saying 'Give heed unto reading,' &c.; secondly, There shall the Archbishop put into his hand the pastoral staff, saying 'Be to the flock of Christ a shepherd...'" This retention of the tradition of elements would be modified in 1552 with a full deletion of vestments.)
Gospel of the day; Credo to postcommunion; Ite, missa est	Creed to Communion; Prayer; Blessing	Creed to Thanksgiving; "Moste merciful Father"; Blessing

== Second Edwardine Ordinal ==
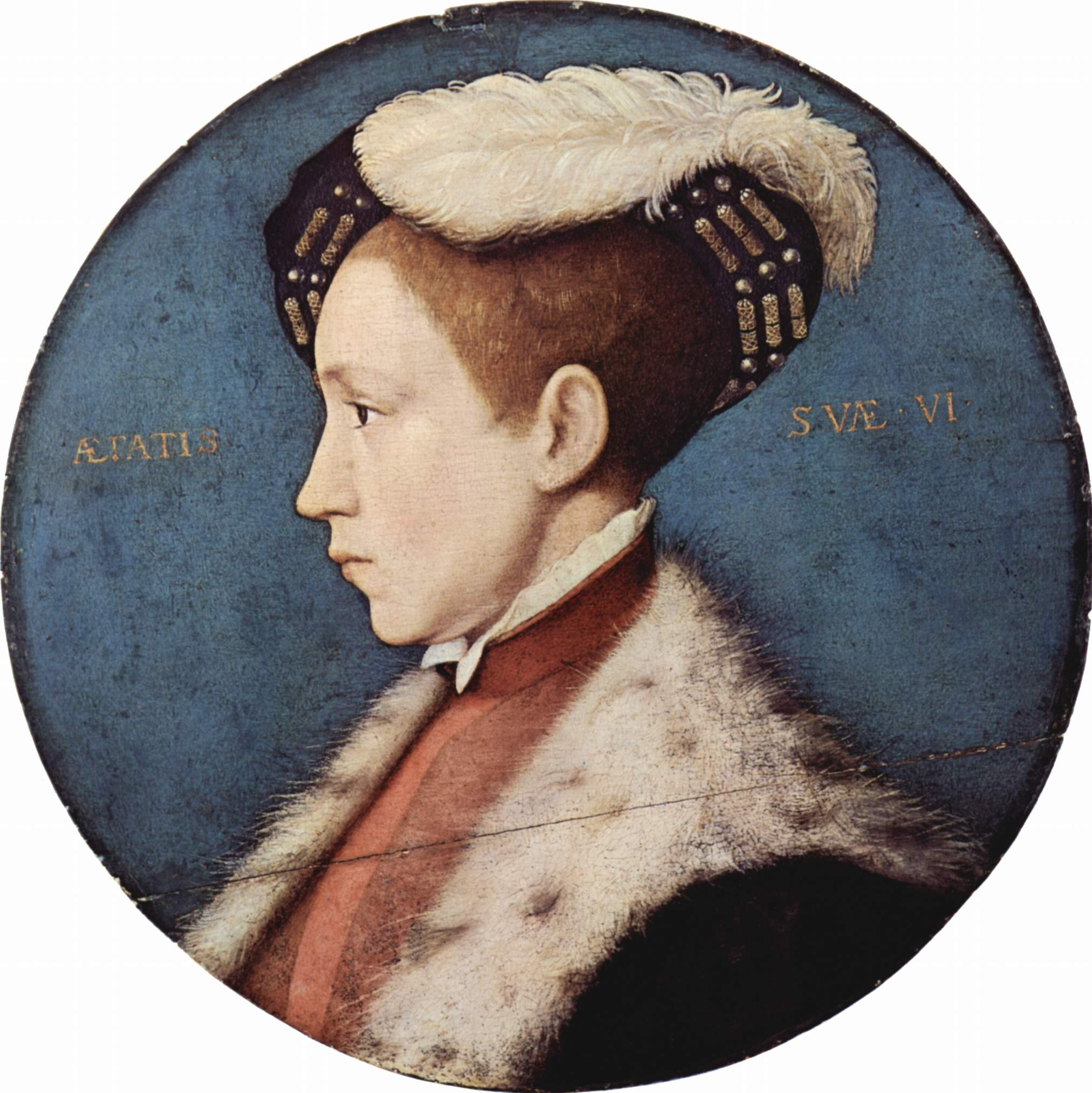
Edward VI, who authorized the production of both ordinals, was 9 years old when he became king in 1547.

Resistance to the first ordinal was not exclusive to the Catholic party. John Hooper was nominated to become the Bishop of Gloucester on Easter 1550, but refused to be consecrated in accordance to the vestments–a surplice and rochet–which were prescribed by the 1550 ordinal. He further rejected an oath within the ordinal which made reference to the saints having publicly pronounced as much on 5 March in a sermon on Jonas. At the urging of Cranmer and Ridley–and following internment at Fleet Prison–Hooper acceded to being consecrated and became a bishop in a legal ceremony on 8 March 1551.

Edward VI is said to have been so moved by Hooper's words that he personally struck the passage from the ordinal's oath; it would be the modified passage which appeared in the 1552 ordinal. The ordinal, as authorized in the 1552 Act of Uniformity and inaugurated on 1 November, would drop the vestment requirement; ordinands would not be required to wear an alb. This incident would form the basis of the long-running Vestiarian Controversy, which was reignited with the Ornaments Rubric in 1559.

This day all copes and vestments were put downe through England, and the prebendaries of Pawles left of their hoodes, and the Bishops their crosses, so that all prestes and clarkes should use none other vestmentes, at service nor communion, but surplisses onely.

— Charles Wriothesley, Wriothesley's Chronicle, on the inauguration of the 1552 prayer book and ordinal

As with most later prayer books, the 1552 prayer book was now typically bound together with the ordinal; every parish in the Kingdom of England was legally required to purchase a copy 1552 prayer book. However, the ordinal retained its own title page and at least one printing gave it a separate 16-page foliation.

This new ordinal deleted giving the priestly candidate any items outside of the Bible; the giving of the Bible remained a practice in the subsequent Church of England prayer books. Reginald Pole, Catholic cardinal and Mary I's Counter-Reformation Archbishop of Canterbury, reiterated Eugene IV's position that the tradition of elements that had been deleted in the 1552 ordinal were necessary for ordination. These changes from the practices of the pontificals implied an alteration in the purpose of the priesthood, from a Catholic understanding a "consecrating" and "sacrificing priest" to one where an "Anglican priest is a presbyter, not a sacrificing priest". Unlike certain portions of the 1552 prayer book that use the word "minister", the 1552 ordinal used the word "priest" for the presbyterial office. "Priest" was considered too "popish" by some English clergy and laity and by the late 16th century many would independently adopt "minister" as their preferred word for the station.

With the death of Edward VI in July 1553 at age 15, the Catholic Mary I ascended to throne and initiated the Marian Persecutions against the English Reformers. Mary I restored a "Pre-Reformation Catholicism" and reinstated the medieval liturgical books in England during her 1553-1558 reign, suppressing the 1552 ordinal. She further reintroduced the minor orders and deprived married clergy of their benefices. However, historian Paul F. Bradshaw held that the account of Mary's reign by the contemporaneous Catholic apologist Nicholas Sanders indicates that there was "no settle policy" among English Catholics regarding the validity of Anglican orders. Sander's account holds that, initially, priests were not investigated to determine by whom or by which form they were ordained. Episcopal registers report that certain clergy ordained according to Edwardine Ordinals' forms were reordained during the Marian period, but do not record the reason.

=== Elizabethan restoration and further revision ===
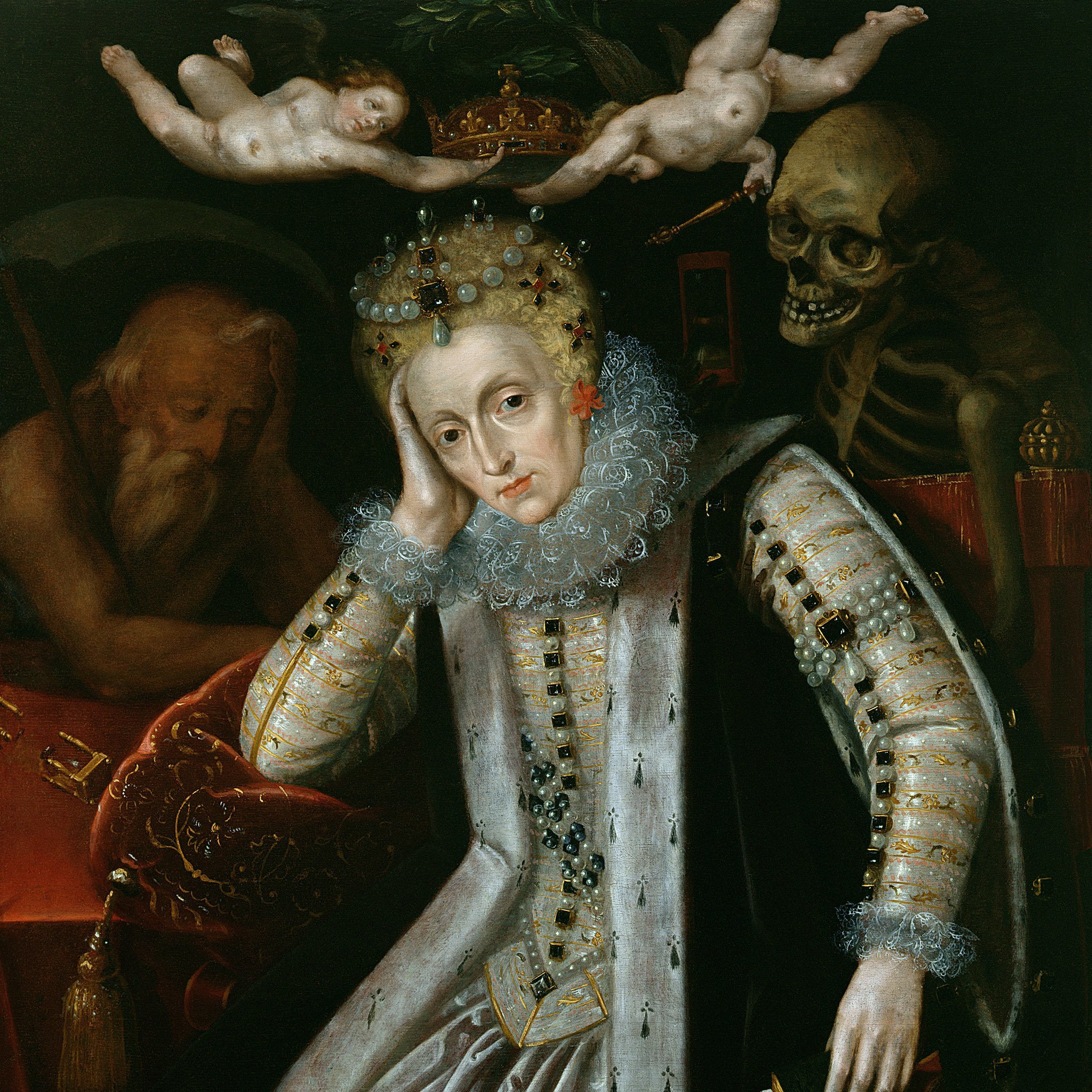
Elizabeth I was required to strike a via media between Reformation and Catholic impulses.

Following Elizabeth I assuming the throne and the Elizabethan Religious Settlement's return of Reformation values, the 1552 ordinal that had accompanied the 1552 prayer book was thought to have been authorized under the 1559 Act of Uniformity. However, William Cecil, Elizabeth's Secretary of State, advised the queen that the act made no mention of the ordinal and that Thomas Cranmer's ordination liturgy was illegal. Despite this, the text was accepted along with the subsequent 1559 Book of Common Prayer; though, unlike in 1552, the "orphaned ordinal" would not appear in the table of contents of the 1559 prayer book and copies of the ordinal bound independently from the prayer book comprise the whole run of at least one printer's ordinals. It is possible that the ordinal was intended for sale separately from the 1559 prayer book. The ordinal published in 1559 was essentially identical to that of 1552, but altered the wording of the oath from the "King's Supremacy" to the "Queen's Sovereignty" and removed reference to the pope's "usurped power and authority". A 1565 act of Parliament would establish the ordinal as "good, lawful and perfect."

Fleeing the Marian Persecution, many English Reformers had encountered the Continental ordination patterns and ministerial theologies. In Frankfurt, exiles encountered liturgy according to the local "Liturgy of Compromise" described four ministerial offices–pastors, teachers, elders, and deacons–but lacked ordination rites. Some of the exiled Englishmen were further exiled from Frankfurt and would thus become familiar with the Genevan reformed liturgies as organized by John Calvin. Returning during the Elizabethan restoration, many were dismayed that they were not permitted to introduce Continental influences to English rites but instead were to celebrate ordination according to the 1552 ordinal.

This tension meant the religious situation of the Elizabethan period saw a significant degree of nonconformism and associated tendencies towards Presbyterianism alongside Catholic recusancy. In 1562, the pope forbade Catholics from attending Church of England services while some Calvinists rejected the official liturgies on their own theological grounds. John Whitgift became Archbishop of Canterbury in 1583 and, despite his Calvinist deferences, supported the "orthodoxy" of the Church of England in its view priesthood as a sacred office as defined in the Book of Common Prayer and the ordinal's ritual for ordaining priests and consecrating bishops. (Note: The late 16th century featured several nonconformist Protestant alternatives to the Book of Common Prayer and the Church of England's other approved texts, sometimes secretly used inside England. Among the most prominent of these was John Knox's adaption of John Calvin's La Forme des Prières that developed into the Book of Common Order which was approved by the Scottish Assembly in 1564.)

In the moderately revised 1604 prayer book, a canon was appended to specify the minimum age of a candidate for the priesthood and mandated that all candidates to that office hold a university degree. In preparation for the 1661 prayer book revision, John Cosin annotated his personal copy of the 1552 ordinal. The most significant deviation between the second Edwardine Ordinal and the ordinal as contained within the 1662 Book of Common Prayer was the phrasing in the imperative formula in the episcopal and priestly ordinations; these were expanded to included reference to the particular office a candidate was being ordained to. Unlike prior editions, the ordinal was not only bound together with the 1662 prayer book but considered a part of the prayer book.

== Later influence ==
In 1909, a resolution was raised at the Church of England's convocation in the Committee of the Lower House of Canterbury to alter a portion of the ordination of deacons which had remained unchanged since 1550. The examination posed towards diaconal ordinands concerning the sufficiency of Scripture was to be altered with influence from the examination of priests to adopt a "less fundamentalist attitude to Scripture." This proposal was steadfastly opposed by Henry Wace and other Evangelicals, but a majority favored a change. Initially, this majority failed to agree on a revised wording and the York Convocation supported retain the original form; ultimately, a revised form was adopted after years of discussion. Possibly as a result of this dispute, few other alterations to the ordinal were debated by convocation despite outside proposals to implement further revisions during the attempts to authorise a revised prayer book.

Following the Anglican Church of Australia's adoption of An Australian Prayer Book in 1978 and the introduction of the ordination of women, longtime Moore Theological College principal Broughton Knox fostered a movement in Sydney that saw deference towards the 1552 conceptualization of the priesthood. This saw an increase in lay ministration, an aversion to "cultic" sacramental and charismatic worship, and "exclusive" congregationalism.

The traditio instrumentorum has remained excluded from most Anglican ordination rituals following the 1552 ordinal, though it was reintroduced as an optional ceremony within ordinations according to the Church of England's Common Worship, a series of liturgical texts introduced in 2000 to serve as an alternative to the 1662 prayer book. There, the vessels are presented before the Holy Communion so that they be used within the liturgy. The Church of Ireland's 2004 Book of Common Prayer–which, like the 1552 prayer book, notionally considers the ordinal a separate text–retains the delivery of the Bible to new priests, though officially this action has no bearing on the validity of the rite.

== Debate over validity of ordinations ==
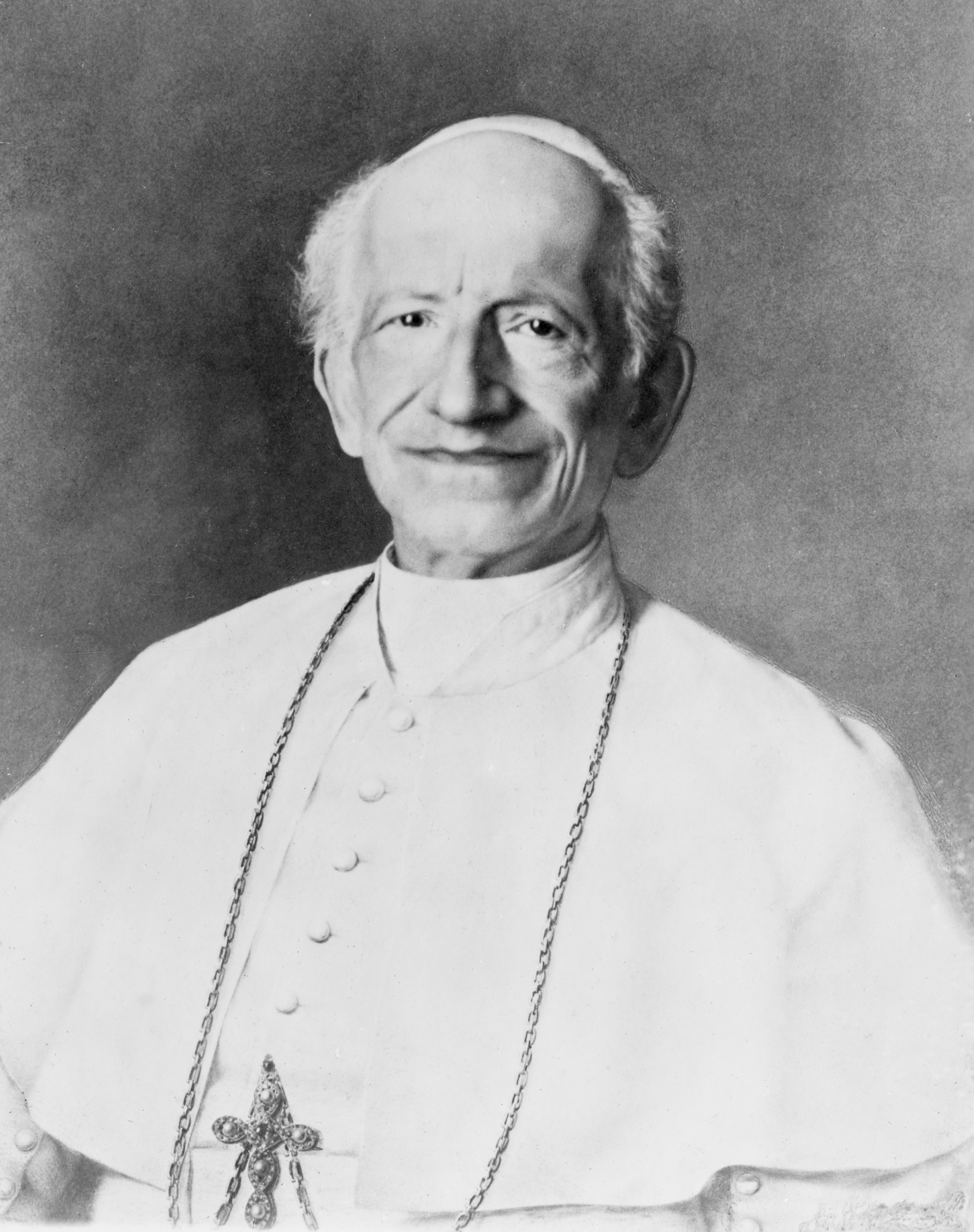
Pope Leo XIII declared Anglican orders "absolutely null and utterly void" in 1896 (Apostolicae curae).

The Catholic Church and its members have repeatedly questioned the validity of Anglican orders, with pronouncements and policy latterly maintaining them as invalid according to the church. Catholic critics have argued that since Mary I's reign Anglican orders according to the Edwardine Ordinals have been seen as invalid, citing a 1554 injunction; the merits of this conclusion have been disputed by Bradshaw. A canonical decree issued in 1704 formally recognized Anglican orders as invalid. French Catholic Pierre François le Courayer, writing after moving to England, took an opposing position and cited that the Edwardine form was similar in substance to the Roman Pontifical. In 1852, Daniel Rock wrote approvingly of the 1704 decree and considered it still applicable in response to an American Episcopal Church bishop, Levi Silliman Ives, traveling to Rome to convert to Catholicism. In 1871, English Benedictine Wilfrid Raynal held that the 1662 ordinal's forms would be sufficient for valid ordinations, but that these changes "came too late to save the Anglican Church" as he considered their apostolic succession already broken.

According to 19th and 20th Catholics that held Anglican orders as invalid, the Edwardine Ordinals and their formulae failed to proclaim that candidates were being raised to a "sacrificial office" in the ordination to the priesthood and episcopate. It was a "defect of form" and a "defect of that intention" within the required for ordination—the latter argued as present in at least the 16th century—which were evaluated by Pope Leo XIII as invalidating Anglican Holy Orders in his papal bull on the matter, the 1896 Apostolicae curae. (Note: The 1896 papal bull would be the first official approbation of the word "ordinal" in reference to ordination rites by the Catholic Church.) Additionally, the personal sacramental theology of the ordinals' authors were identified by Leo XIII as invalidating Anglican orders.

Frederick Temple and William Maclagan–the Archbishops of Canterbury and York respectively–sent a response in 1897, Saepius officio, addressing the criticisms and arguments made in Apostolicae curae. This letter was not received with much notice and has been given little academic consideration despite its direct disputation of Leo XIII's points. Of particular note were its liturgical discussion and the authors' belief that the papal bull would find defects "in the catechisms of the Oriental Church". The assertion that Catholics rejecting the form contained within the Edwardine Ordinals would also mean rejecting Eastern Christian orders had been raised previously, premised on the similarity between the Byzantine Rite ordinations–from which Latin and other Eastern liturgical practices were derived–and the Edwardine Ordinals. Raynal, writing in 1871, had commented on similar objections and claimed that even shorter Eastern Catholic ordination liturgies such as that of the Maronite Church were "brief but sufficient."

The preface to the 1552 also drew Catholic criticism. Unlike the 1552 ordinal's form, which Catholic authorities held were "definitively and unambiguously heretical", the preface was "ambiguous" on certain matters of doctrine, namely that of the Eucharist. The belief priests are able to transubstantiate the Eucharist rather than simply perform a "commemorative ritual feast" is considered a necessary component of valid ordinations by the Catholic Church; the lack of specificity in the 1552 ordinal's preface has been presented as potential evidence of an implied deficient theology.

The matter of whether certain bishops from whom later Anglicans derived their apostolic succession were consecrated according to the 1552 ordinal or revived Sarum Pontifical was another point of debate. One such challenged consecration was that of Matthew Parker, who became Archbishop of Canterbury in 1559 and was principally consecrated by William Barlow. Despite some 20th-century efforts to place Parker's consecration in October 1559 and thus according to the Sarum Pontifical, other commentators have placed the date in December 1559 and determined it was according to the second Edwardine Ordinal.

== See also ==
- Anglican Communion
- Forty-two Articles
- List of Anglican bishops who converted to Roman Catholicism
- Primer (prayer book)
- The Sunday Service of the Methodists
