= Ad tuendam fidem =

1998 apostolic letter by Pope John Paul II

Ad tuendam fidem Latin for 'To Protect the Faith' Apostolic constitution of Pope John Paul II
- Signature date: 18 May 1998
- Subject: Profession of faith
- Text: In Latin; In English

Ad tuendam fidem (English: To Protect the Faith) is an apostolic letter of Pope John Paul II issued motu proprio on May 18, 1998. The apostolic letter modified the Oriental and Latin codes of canon law specifying the form of profession of faith to be made by ministers of the Catholic Church before assuming office.

== Description ==
The Congregation for the Doctrine of the Faith accompanied publication of the document with a doctrinal commentary, clarifying the three levels of authoritative teaching of the church. The highest level is that of doctrines solemnly propounded as revealed by God. These call for divine faith. The second level is that of doctrines likewise infallibly taught not as revealed by God but as truths inseparably connected with revelation. The third category is that of teachings on matters more or less loosely connected with revelation that without being set forth with the solemnity of infallible doctrines are nevertheless authoritative. For this last category, what is required of Catholics is "religious submission of will and intellect". The other two call for firm and definitive assent, an assent that in the first category is one of divine faith.

The congregation's doctrinal commentary gave several examples of teachings of the first category, including the articles of the creed, and teachings on the sacrificial nature of the Eucharist and on the grave immorality of direct and voluntary killing of an innocent human being. The second category includes teachings on such matters as the illicitness of euthanasia, prostitution and fornication, and on what are called "dogmatic facts", such as the canonization of saints and the invalidity of Anglican ordinations.
