= Exhortation and Litany =

1544 prayer book by Thomas Cranmer

The Exhortation and Litany, published in 1544, is the earliest officially authorized vernacular service in English. The same rite survives, in modified form, in the Book of Common Prayer.

== Background ==
Before the English Reformation, processions were important parts of worship on Sundays and holy days, such as Candlemas and Rogation days. The government also ordered processions in times of trouble and danger. The litany was a penitential processional service used in time of trouble or to express sorrow for sins. It consisted chiefly of very short intercessory petitions to God and the saints said by the priest and a brief standard response from the choir or congregation. The penitential psalms were also recited as time allowed.

On 20 August 1543, Henry VIII had ordered "general rogations and processions to be made" on account of the multiple troubles England was experiencing, but public response was slack. This was attributed in part to the fact that the people did not understand what was being said and sung, since the litany was said in Latin. Therefore, an English version was composed by Thomas Cranmer, Archbishop of Canterbury, for use in the processions ordered by Henry when England was simultaneously at war with both Scotland and France.

== Content and use ==
For the litany, Cranmer drew heavily on both traditional and recent sources ranging from John Chrysostom to Martin Luther, the bulk of the material coming from the Sarum Rite. Much of the work of synthesizing these sources was originally done by William Marshall in his Lutheran-oriented primer prayer book, the Goodly Primer of 1535. Cranmer also changed the rhythm of the service by grouping the intercessory phrases in blocks with but a single response to the group.

The litany was published in the midst of the English Reformation and shows clear signs of Protestant influence. Protestants disliked both the traditional litany's veneration of saints as well as liturgical processions in general. In Cranmer's litany, the invocation of saints was heavily reduced and only Mary, the mother of Jesus, was mentioned by name. In all, Cranmer's revision reduced what had once been the major part of the litany into just three petitions: to the Blessed Virgin Mary, the angels, and all the saints. The penitential psalms that were traditionally said at the beginning were left out. The litany was prefaced with an "Exhortation to Prayer", which was a homily-styled discourse on the nature of prayer. The "Exhortation" was intended to be read in public before the procession started.

Published on 27 May 1544, the litany was the first authorised English-language service. It was to be used for Rogation and Lenten processions. Cranmer also produced an English translation of the Processionale, the Latin service-book containing other processional services for Sundays and saints days; however, this project was abandoned. In October 1545, the Processionale was completely replaced by the new English litany. This was an important change because it meant that the somber, penitential litany would now be said on joyful feast days. In August 1547, after Edward VI had become king, processions were prohibited completely. The litany was thereafter sung while kneeling in church.

== Book of Common Prayer ==
Cranmer's litany was included in the first Book of Common Prayer published in 1549. It was also included in the 1552 prayer book and the 1559 prayer book. One part of the litany has the people pray for deliverance "from the tyranny of the bishop of Rome and all his detestable enormities." In the 1559 prayer book, this invocation against the Pope was deleted.

== Bibliography ==
- Cross, F.L.; Livingstone, E.A., eds. (1974), "Litany, The (BCP)", The Oxford Dictionary of the Christian Church, OUP.
- Duffy, Eamon (2005) [1992]. The Stripping of the Altars: Traditional Religion in England, c. 1400 – c. 1580 (2nd ed.). Yale University Press. ISBN 978-0-300-10828-6.
- Jacobs, Alan (2013). The Book of Common Prayer: A Biography. Lives of Great Religious Books. Princeton University Press. ISBN 9780691191782.
- Jeanes, Gordon (2006). "Cranmer and Common Prayer". In Hefling, Charles; Shattuck, Cynthia (eds.). The Oxford Guide to The Book of Common Prayer: A Worldwide Survey. Oxford University Press. pp. 21–38. ISBN 978-0-19-529756-0.
- MacCulloch, Diarmaid (2016) [1996]. Thomas Cranmer: A Life (Revised ed.). London: Yale University Press. ISBN 978-0-300-06688-3.
- Marshall, Peter (2017). Heretics and Believers: A History of the English Reformation. Yale University Press. ISBN 978-0300170627.
- Procter, Francis; Frere, Walter Howard (1908). A New History of the Book of Common Prayer. MacMillan.
- Wohlers, Charles (ed.), Exhortation and Litany (1544), Society of Archbishop Justus: Resources.
