= Pontifical =

Christian liturgical book for episcopal liturgies

A pontifical (Latin: pontificale) is a Christian liturgical book containing the liturgies that only a bishop may perform. Among the liturgies are those of the ordinal for the ordination and consecration of deacons, priests, and bishops to Holy Orders. While the Roman Pontifical and closely related Ceremonial of Bishops of the Roman Rite are the most common, pontificals exist in other liturgical traditions.

== History ==
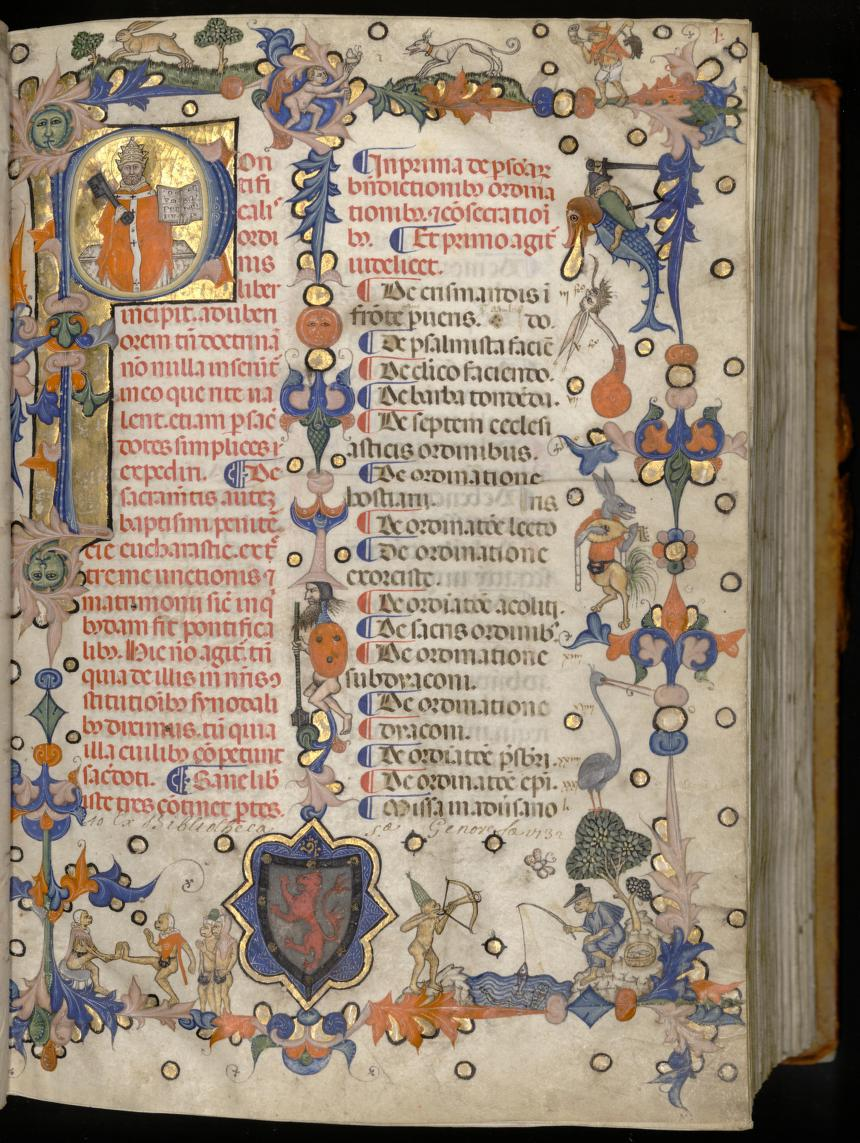
A French illuminated pontifical from 1357

Pontificals in Latin Christianity first developed from sacramentaries by the 8th century. Besides containing the texts of exclusively episcopal liturgies such as the Pontifical High Mass, liturgies that other clergymen could celebrate were also present. The contents varied throughout the Middle Ages, but eventually a pontifical only contained those liturgies a bishop could perform. The Pontificale Egberti, a pontifical that once belonged to and was perhaps authored by Ecgbert of York, is regarded as one of the most notable early pontificals and may be the oldest to survive.

The ordination liturgies of the Sarum Use pontifical was adapted by Thomas Cranmer into his 1550 ordinal for the Church of England following the English Reformation. Among the complaints lodged by Anglicans against the medieval Catholic pontificals was that the laying on of hands during the conferral of Holy Orders was "obscured by ceremonies."

A pontifical was printed in Rome in 1485 but the first authoritative Roman Pontifical was not printed until 1596 under Clement VIII. Revisions of the Roman Pontifical (Latin: Pontificale Romanum) continued over the next centuries, though was largely replaced by the Ceremonial of Bishops (Latin: Caeremoniale Episcoporum) that had been developing alongside it, with the rubrics for the celebration of a Pontifical High Mass deleted from the pontifical and celebrated from the ceremonial. Among the contents of both these texts during the 17th century was the inclusion of illustrations depicting the relevant pontifical vestments to be worn during the celebration of the liturgies. The 1961 Roman Pontifical modified the blessings for these vestments, adding the cope and humeral veil to the list of articles that might be blessed.

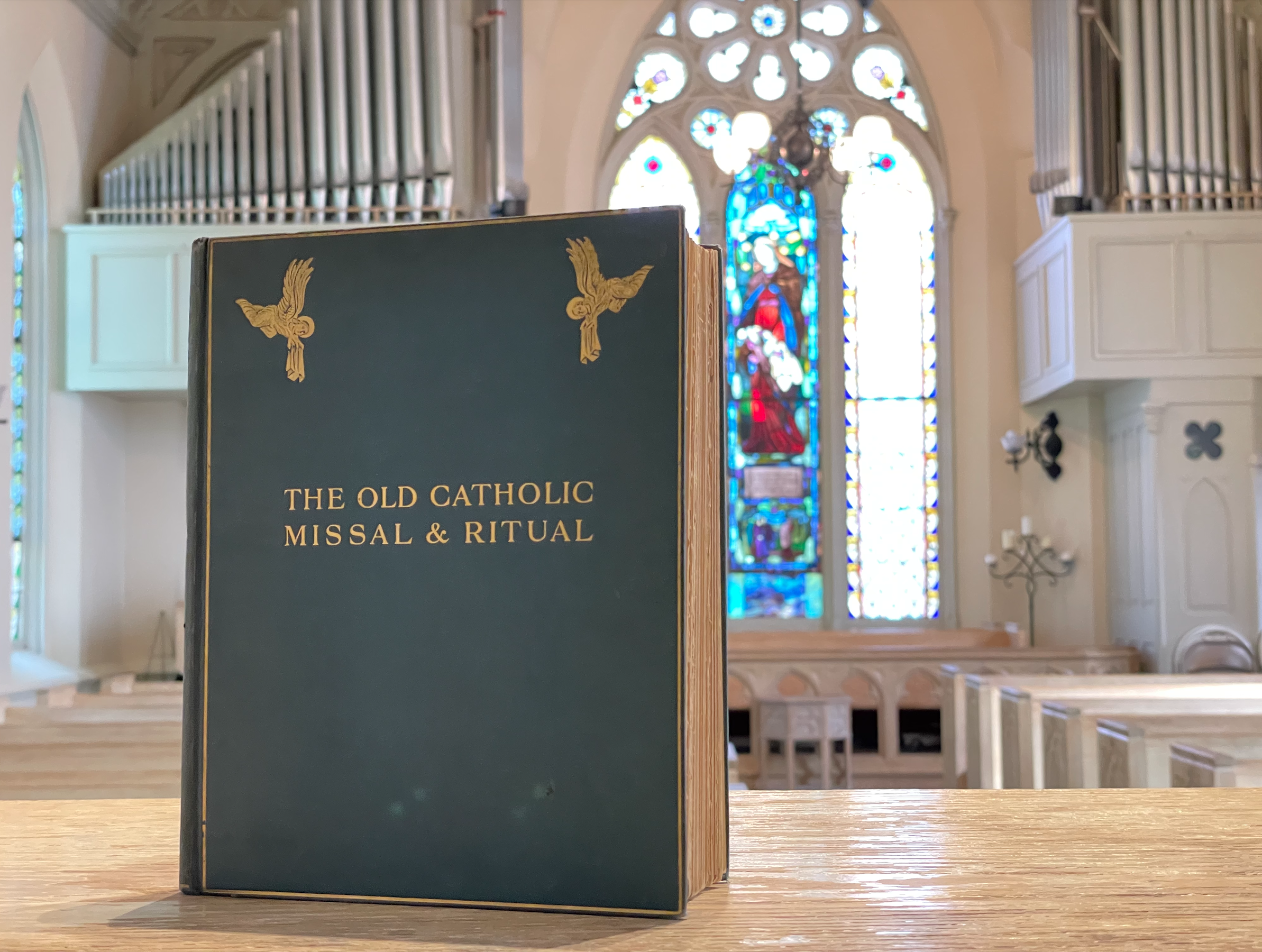
Arnold Mathew's 1909 translation of the Old Catholic missal, ritual, and pontifical

The Union of Utrecht, a communion of Old Catholic denominations, adapted and translated the Roman Pontifical into German at Bern in 1899. The pontifical was later translated into Dutch and Polish. This was just one of several liturgical books of the Roman Rite translated by the Union of Utrecht in its early years. An English translation of this pontifical, executed by Arnold Mathew and including the Old Catholic missal, was published in 1909. In 1985, this pontifical was replaced by a new text that incorporated a rite for ordaining deaconesses.

Within the Maronite Church–an Eastern Catholic church–the term pontifical was applied to texts of a similar purpose as their Latin counterparts by the 18th century. During the 17th century, such a text was approved by the Maronite clergy and submitted for review in Rome, though went unpublished. The manuscript, labelled as a pontifical, was translated into Latin in 1723 at the Maronite College. In 2008, a revised Maronite pontifical by Stephen Youssef Doueihi was published and approved for English-language use.

== Byzantine Rite ==
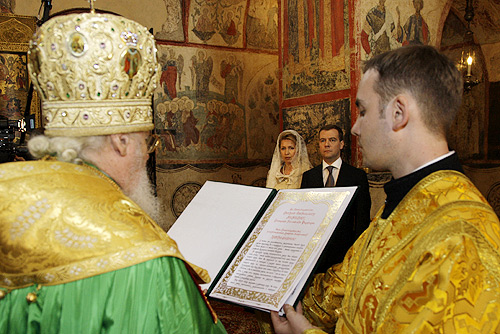
A server holding the Archieratikon for a Russian Orthodox Patriarch of Moscow.

In the Eastern Orthodox Church and Byzantine Rite Eastern Catholic churches, the equivalent of a pontifical is the Archieratikon (Greek: Ἀρχηιερατικόν; Slavonic: Чиновникъ, Chinovnik). This book is often in a large format and contains only those portions of Vespers, Matins, and the Divine Liturgy which pertain to the bishop (hierarch). It also contains those rites (ordination, the consecration of a church or altar, etc.) which are normally performed only by a bishop. The Euchologion combines some features present in Latin missals, rituals, and pontificals into a single text.

== See also ==
- Book of Common Prayer
- Customary (liturgy)
- Pontificale Romano-Germanicum
- Primer (prayer book)
