= Apostolicae curae =

Papal bull by Leo XIII

Apostolicae curae Latin for 'With Apostolic care' Apostolic letter of Pope Leo XIII
- Signature date: 13 September 1896
- Subject: Anglican orders are confirmed to be invalid
- Text: In Latin
- AAS: 29 (1896–1897): 193–203

Apostolicae curae is the title of an apostolic letter, issued in 1896 by Pope Leo XIII, declaring all Anglican ordinations to be "absolutely null and utterly void". The Anglican Communion made no official reply, but the archbishops of Canterbury and York of the Church of England published a response known by its Latin title Saepius officio in 1897.

Leo XIII deemed Anglican ordinations to be invalid because he found the Anglican Edwardine Ordinals deficient in intention and form. He declared that the rites expressed an intention to create a priesthood different from the sacrificing priesthood of the Catholic Church and to reduce ordination to a mere ecclesiastical institution instead of a sacramental conferral of actual grace by the action itself, thereby invalidating any sacramental holy orders. He raised similar objection to the Anglican rite for the consecration of bishops, thus dismissing the entire subject of the apostolic succession of Anglican priests and bishops from validly ordained 16th-century bishops.

The view of many Anglican bishops and defenders was that the required references to the sacrificial priesthood at the heart of the Roman argument never existed in many of the ancient Latin liturgical rites' ordination liturgies, or in certain Eastern Catholic ordination liturgies that the Catholic Church considered to be valid. In the Catholic view, the differences between these rites are a matter of tradition or custom, and indicate no intention to exclude a sacrificing priesthood.

== Context ==
In 1896, Pope Leo XIII established a commission to reconsider the validity and liceity of all Anglican orders after receiving an appeal for such a review from Fernand Portal, a Catholic priest and former missionary, and Charles Wood, 2nd Viscount Halifax, an Anglican. Following the establishment of the Church of England outside of papal authority, the Catholic Church did not recognize the consecrations of bishops by a prelate who accepted the supremacy of the English monarch and whose appointments lacked papal confirmation. Several centuries later, some hoped that a review in light of a contemporary understanding of grace that had developed in sacramental theology would support a different assessment. Leo's commission was equally divided between two opposing views, and Leo relied on his personal theologian, Cardinal Raffaele Pierotti, who was titled the Master of the Apostolic Palace (the role now called Theologian of the Pontifical Household). Pierotti held a negative position on the validity of Anglican orders and believed that reaffirmation of their invalidity would result in many converts to Catholicism.

== Defect of Anglican ordination rites asserted ==
=== Origins ===
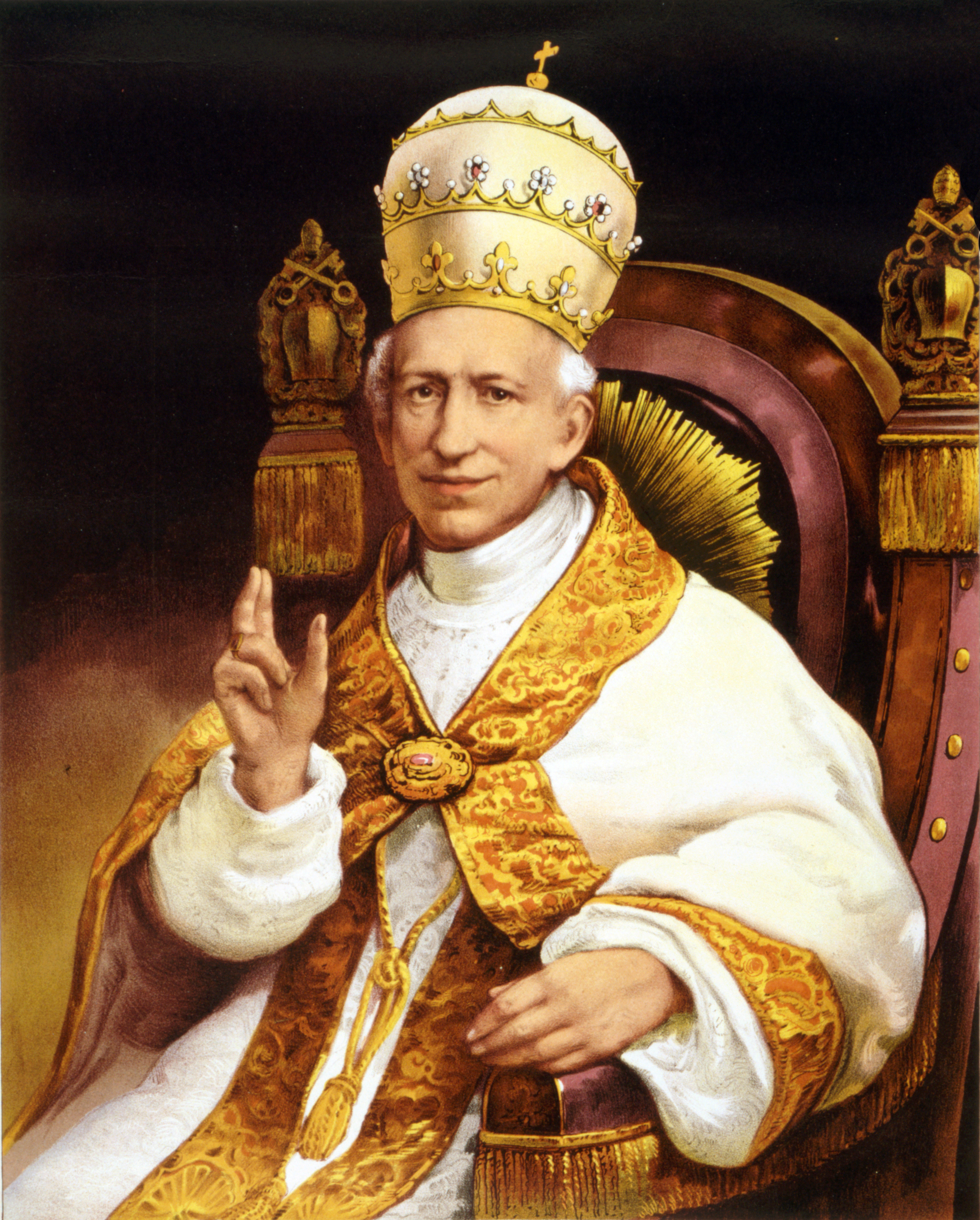
The bull of Pope Leo XIII declared all Anglican orders "absolutely null and utterly void"

Prior to Apostolicae curae, decisions had already been given by Rome that Anglican orders were invalid. The practices of the Catholic Church had supposed their invalidity. Whenever former Anglican priests desired to be priests in the Catholic Church they were unconditionally ordained. As the Oxford Movement progressed, several members of the clergy and laity of the Church of England argued that the Catholic Church practice of unconditionally ordaining clerical converts from Anglicanism arose out of a lack of inquiry into the validity of Anglican orders and from mistaken assumptions which, in the light of certain historical investigations, could no longer be asserted.

Those who were interested in a corporate reunion of Rome and Canterbury thought that, as a condition to such reunion, Anglican orders might be accepted as valid by the Catholic Church. A few Catholic writers thought that there was at least room for doubt and joined with them in seeking a fresh inquiry into the question and an authoritative judgment from Pope Leo XIII who permitted the question to be re-examined. He commissioned a number of men, whose opinions on the matter were known to be divergent, to state the grounds for judgment in writing. He then summoned them to Rome and directed them to exchange writings. The pope placed at their disposal all the documents available and directed them to further investigate and discuss the matter. Thus prepared, he ordered them to meet in special sessions under the presidency of a cardinal appointed by him. Twelve such sessions were held in which "all were invited to free discussion". He then directed that the acts of those sessions, together with all the documents, should be submitted to a council of cardinals, "so that when all had studied the whole subject and discussed it in Our presence each might give his opinion". The final result was the papal bull Apostolicae curae, in which Anglican orders were declared to be invalid. The bull was issued in September 1896 and declared Anglican orders to be "absolutely null and utterly void": "ordinationes ritu anglicano actas irritas prorsus fuisse et esse, omninoque nullas." The bull explained at length that the decision rested on extrinsic and on intrinsic grounds.

=== Extrinsic grounds ===
The extrinsic grounds were said to be in the fact of the implicit approval of the Holy See given to the constant practice of unconditionally ordaining former Anglican priests who desired to be priests in the Catholic Church and, also, in the explicit declarations of the Holy See as to the invalidity of Anglican orders on every occasion when its decision was given. According to the teaching of the Catholic Church, to attempt to confer orders a second time on the same person would be a sacrilege. Rome, by knowingly allowing the practice of ordaining former Anglican priests, supposed that their orders were invalid. The bull points out that orders received in the Church of England, according to the change introduced into the ritual under King Edward VI, were thought to be invalid by the Catholic Church. This was not through a custom grown up gradually, but from the date of that change in the ritual.

When the reconciliation of the Church of England with the Holy See took place in the reign of Queen Mary I and King Philip, Pope Julius III sent Cardinal Reginald Pole as legate to England with powers to meet the case. Those powers were "certainly not intended to deal with an abstract state of things, but with a specific and concrete issue". They were directed towards providing for holy orders in England "as the recognized condition of the circumstances and the times demanded". The powers given to Pole on 8 March 1554 distinguished two classes of priests:

the first, those who had really received sacred orders, either before the secession of Henry VIII, or, if after it and by ministers infected by error and schism, still according to the accustomed Catholic Rite; the second, those who were initiated according to the Edwardine Ordinal, who on that account could be promoted, since they had received an ordination that was null

The mind of Julius III appears also from the letter dated 29 January 1555 by which Pole delegated his powers to the Bishop of Norwich. To the same effect was a bull issued by Pope Paul IV on 20 June 1555 and a brief dated 30 October 1555. Apostolicae curae also cites John Clement Gordon who had received orders according to the Edwardine ritual. Pope Clement XI issued a decree on 17 April 1704 that he should be ordained unconditionally and he grounded his decision on the "defect of form and intention".

=== Intrinsic grounds ===
The intrinsic reason for which Anglican orders were pronounced invalid by the bull, was the "defect of form and intention". It set forth that "the Sacraments of the New Law, as sensible and efficient signs of invisible grace, ought both to signify the grace which they effect, and effect the grace which they signify". The rite used in administering a sacrament must be directed to the meaning of that sacrament or else there would be no reason why the rite used in one sacrament may not effect another. What effects a sacrament is the intention of administering that sacrament and the rite used according to that intention. The bull took note of the fact that in 1662 the form introduced in the Edwardine ordinal of 1552 had added to it the words: "for the office and work of a priest". But it observed that this shows that the Anglicans themselves perceived that the first form was defective and inadequate. Rome felt that even if this addition could give the form its due signification, it was introduced too late. A century had already elapsed since the adoption of the Edwardine ordinal and as the hierarchy had become extinct there remained no power of ordaining.

The same was held to be true of episcopal consecration. The episcopate is thought to constitute the priesthood in the highest degree. It was concluded that the true priesthood was utterly eliminated from the Anglican rite and the priesthood was in no way conferred truly and validly in the episcopal consecration of the same rite. For the same reason the episcopate was in no way truly and validly conferred by it and this the more so because among the first duties of the episcopate is that of ordaining ministers for the Holy Eucharist.

The pope went on to state that the Anglican ordinal had included what he felt were the errors of the English Reformation. It could not be used to confer valid orders, nor could it later be purged of this original defect, chiefly because he felt the words used in it had a meaning entirely different from what would be required to confer the sacrament. The pope felt that not only was the proper form for the sacrament lacking in the Anglican ordinal, but the intention was also lacking. He concluded by explaining how carefully and how prudently this matter has been examined by the Holy See. He stated that those who examined it with him were agreed that the question had already been settled, but that it might be reconsidered and decided in the light of the latest controversies over the question. He then declared that ordinations conducted with the Anglican rite were "null and void", and implored those who were not Catholic and who wanted orders to return to the one sheepfold of Christ where they would find the true aids for salvation. He also invited those who were the ministers of religion in their various congregations to be reconciled to the Catholic Church, assuring them of his sympathy in their spiritual struggles. The bull concludes with the usual declaration of the authority of an apostolic letter.

== Anglican responses ==
No official reply was promulgated by the Church of England or by any other Anglican church. At the Lambeth Conference of 1897 a subcommittee report made reference to "an examination of the position of the Church of England" by the Pope, but they declined to submit any resolution concerning "the Latin communion".

=== Saepius officio ===
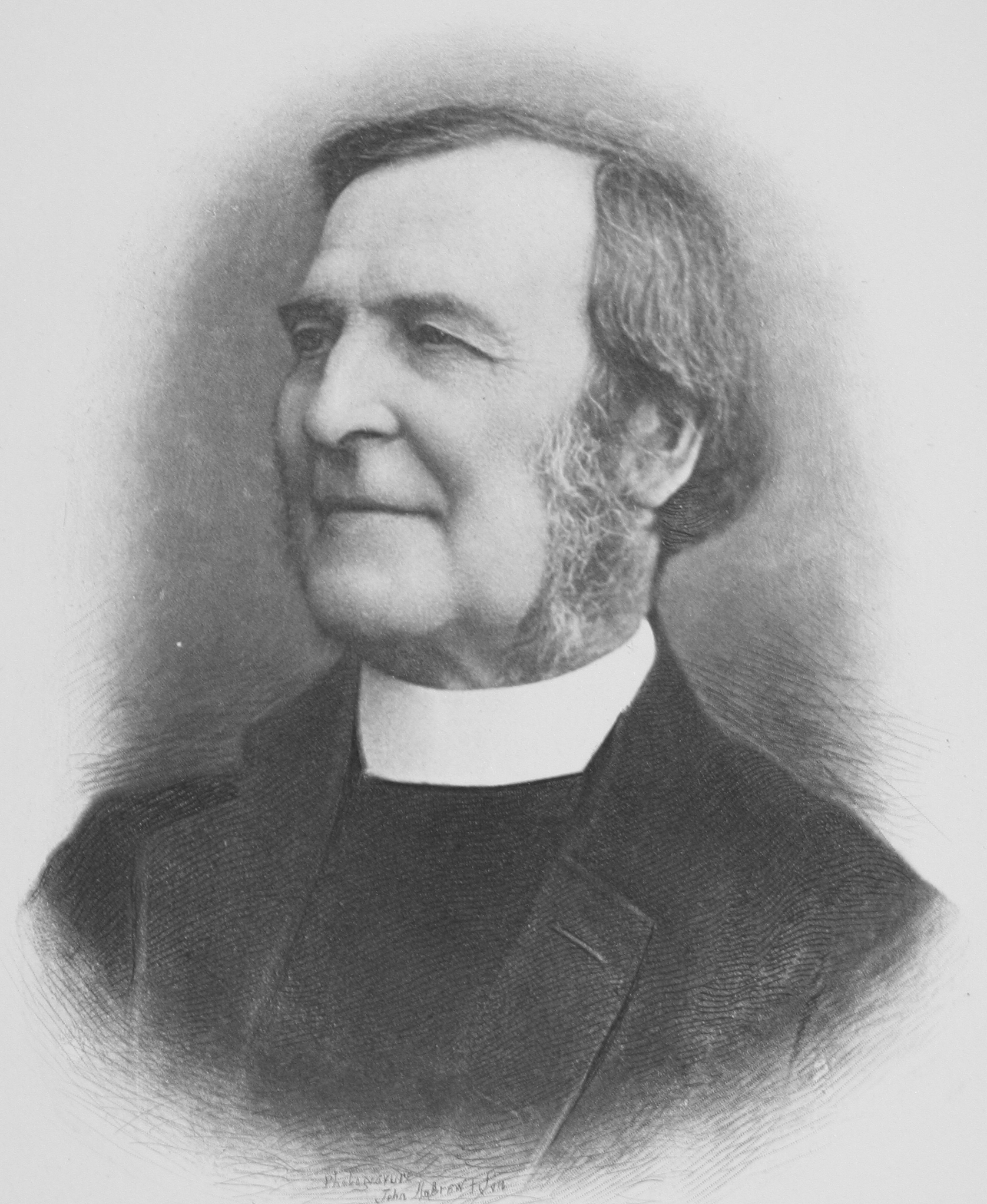
Frederick Temple, Archbishop of Canterbury

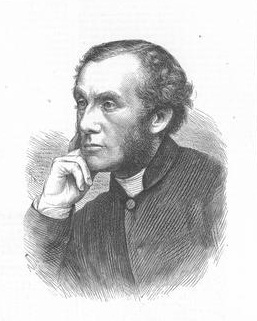
William Maclagan, Archbishop of York

Frederick Temple, Archbishop of Canterbury, and William Maclagan, Archbishop of York, answered Pope Leo's charges in their written response, Saepius officio: Answer of the Archbishops of Canterbury and York to the bull Apostolicae Curae of H.H. Leo XIII.

First, they asserted that the ordination ceremonies in question were biblically valid. They then provided pages of quotations, detailing Catholic and Eastern Orthodox liturgies that they considered guilty of the same alleged offenses. According to the archbishops, if the ordinations of the bishops and priests in the Anglican churches were invalid then, by the same measure, so must be the ordinations of clergy in the Catholic and Eastern Orthodox churches.

On the charge of intent, the response argued that the readmission of the required phrases in 1662 were addressed more to the Presbyterian rather than the Roman controversy. They asserted also that the Book of Common Prayer as a whole contained a strong sacrificial theology in the ordinal. They agreed that, at the time of the reunion of the churches under Queen Mary, many Edwardian priests were deprived for various reasons. They then demonstrated that not one priest was deprived on account of defect of order. Some were voluntarily reordained and others received anointing as a supplement to their previous ordination. Some, and perhaps the majority, remained in their benefices without reordination. By contrast all who were married had to put their wives away as invalidly married. In some cases, Edwardian priests were promoted to higher positions in the Catholic Church. They argued against the pope's example of John Clement Gordon, stating that—among other things—Gordon's desire for reordination had its roots in the discredited Nag's Head Fable.

The Catholic bishops of England and Wales issued a response to Saepius officio, entitled A Vindication of the Bull 'Apostolicae Curae', and pointed out the Protestant theology of Cranmer and the English Reformers. This Vindication dissected Cranmer's theology and aimed to prove the deficiencies of Anglican orders by elaborating on the Bull, noting that the concepts of "Real Presence" and "Sacrifice" were meant in a less objective sense in the Edwardine ordinals. Furthermore, the Vindication demonstrated that in numerous ancient Rites of the Church, Eastern and Western, the notion of a Sacrificing Priesthood was understood similar to the Catholic position, and not at all similar to the Anglican position.

=== Other Anglican responses ===
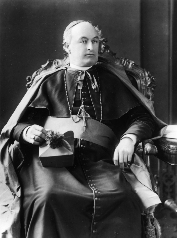
Cardinal Herbert Vaughan

One evangelical response declared that "Christian teaching must be tested by the New Testament, not by any nebulous formula known as 'Catholic truth'".

Another Anglican view was that of Randall Davidson, who succeeded Temple as Archbishop of Canterbury in 1903. He stressed "the strength and depth of the Protestantism of England" and regarded other differences with Rome as much more important than its views on Anglican orders.

Helped by articles in The Times, Apostolicae curae was understood to mean that orders conferred in the Church of England were not, to the Pope, orders in the Catholic sense. Anglican resentment began to abate. Vaughan's biographer comments that, "there would probably have been much more resentment had the Holy See declared in favour of Anglican orders and declared Anglican clergy 'massing priests'". Nonetheless Vaughan saw fit to publish A Vindication of the Bull 'Apostolicae Curae': A Letter on Anglican Orders by the Cardinal Archbishop and Bishops of the Province of Westminster in 1898.

== Subsequent challenges ==
=== Gregory Dix ===
In 1944 Gregory Dix, an Anglican Benedictine monk of Nashdom Abbey, published a defence of Anglican orders, arguing that "It is a commonplace of all theology, Roman or Anglican, that no public formulary can be or ought to be interpreted by the private sense attached to it by the compilers".

"The Church of England", Dix says, "never committed itself in any way to his interpretation of the rites [Cranmer] had compiled and which the State compelled the Church to use", on which Paul F. Palmer commented: "Suffice it to note that Edward VI was recognized as the spiritual head of the Church of England. If the Oath of Supremacy meant anything, it meant at least this much."

Dix opposed the projected church union in South India, which he saw as a possible model for similar schemes in England, and which in his view equated Anglican ordinations and those of Methodists and other Protestants: "What these proposals amount to is an official Anglican admission that Pope Leo XIII was right after all in his fundamental contention in Apostolicae Curae. [...] if these proposals were to be put into practice, the whole ground for believing in the Church of England which I have outlined would have ceased to exist."

=== John Jay Hughes ===
In his 1970 book, Stewards of the Lord: A Reappraisal of Anglican Orders, John Jay Hughes argued that there were enough flaws in and ambiguity surrounding the pope's apostolic letter to merit re-examination of the question of the invalidity of Anglican holy orders. Hughes himself had previously been an Anglican priest and was subsequently conditionally ordained in the Catholic Church. Other Anglican theological critics argued that apostolic succession had never been broken in the first place, due to valid ordinations tracing back to Archbishop William Laud and beyond to Archbishop Matthew Parker. (Note: Laud was ordained Bishop of London by his predecessor who himself had been ordained in a ceremony in which Marcantonio de Dominis, Roman Catholic Archbishop of Spolato, was a co-consecrator. Anglican orders also descend through Hugh Curwin, Archbishop of Dublin (1557–1568), who was consecrated Bishop of Oxford in the Roman rite in 1555 under Queen Mary I.)

=== Basil Hume ===
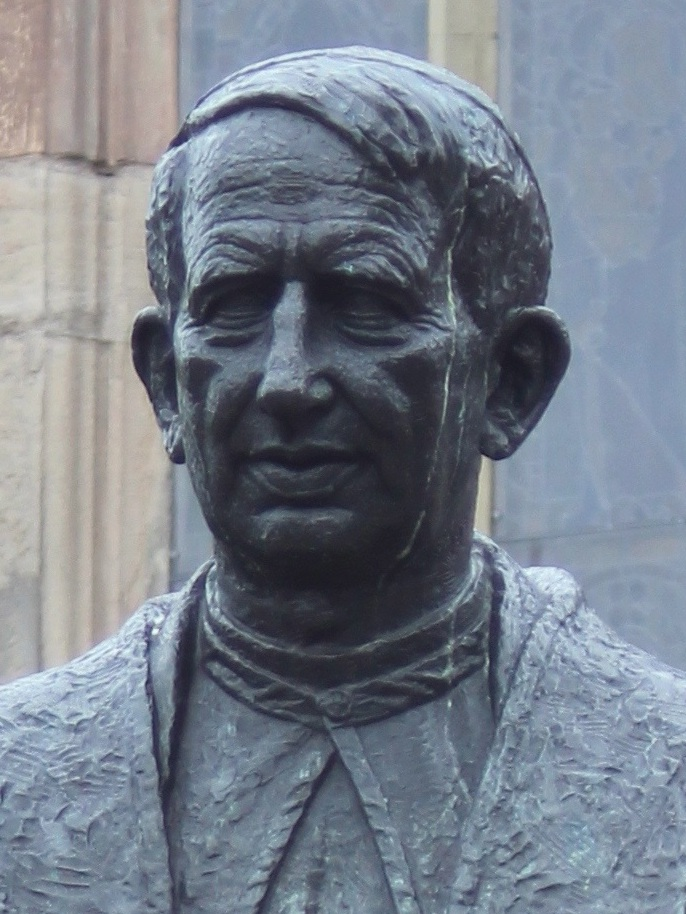
Statue of Cardinal Basil Hume in Newcastle

In 1978, Cardinal Basil Hume, Catholic Archbishop of Westminster (London, England), suggested that the involvement of Old Catholic bishops in Anglican ordinations in the wake of the Bonn Agreement in the 20th century, along with changes of the consecratory prefaces, made it possible that some Anglican orders were valid, and that the 1896 document should be reconsidered. He said:

I could not in practice dismiss all Anglican Orders as "null and void" because I know that a number of Anglican Bishops have in fact had the presence at their ordination of an Old Catholic or an Orthodox bishop, that is, somebody who, in the traditional theology of our Church, has been ordained according to a valid rite. As far as the Roman Catholic Church is concerned, I think it needs to look carefully again at Apostolicae Curae and its status. We need to discover whether the historical background upon which it was working and the argumentation upon which it was based is consonant with historical and theological truth as theologians and historians see it today.

In 1994, Hume reaffirmed the Apostolicae curae judgment that Anglican orders are invalid, but said that, in some "probably rare" cases, it could be doubted that the priestly ordination of a particular Anglican cleric was in fact invalid. If that cleric was to be admitted to ordained ministry in the Catholic Church, the need to avoid any doubt about the validity of the sacraments he would administer still required that he be ordained in the Catholic Church, though conditionally, not in the absolute way used when there is no doubt that the previous Anglican ordination was invalid. In one particular case, this view was approved by Rome.

While firmly restating the judgment of Apostolicae Curae that Anglican ordination is invalid, the Catholic Church takes account of the involvement, in some Anglican episcopal ordinations, of bishops of the Old Catholic Church of the Union of Utrecht who are validly ordained. In particular and probably rare cases the authorities in Rome may judge that there is a "prudent doubt" concerning the invalidity of priestly ordination received by an individual Anglican minister ordained in this line of succession. There are many complex factors that would require verification in each case. Of course, if there were other cases where sufficient evidence was available, the balance of that evidence may lead the authorities to reach a different judgment.

At the same time, he stated:

Since the church must be in no doubt of the validity of the sacraments celebrated for the Catholic community, it must ask all who are chosen to exercise the priesthood in the Catholic Church to accept sacramental ordination in order to fulfill their ministry and be integrated into the apostolic succession.

Hume made these statements in relation to Graham Leonard, formerly a bishop of the Church of England, who became a Catholic after retirement and, in 1994, was ordained a priest by Hume. This ordination was conditional due to "prudent doubt" about the invalidity of his ordination in the Church of England. Rome agreed with Hume's assessment that there was uncertainty in Leonard's case. He was later appointed a Chaplain of His Holiness and then a Prelate of Honour (both of which carry the title Monsignor) by Pope John Paul II on 3 August 2000. The prayer composed by Cardinal Hume for the ordination of Graham Leonard was used by Cardinal Vincent Nichols (Archbishop of Westminster) at the 2021 ordination of the former Anglican Bishop Michael Nazir-Ali, noting the "fruitfulness for salvation" of his ministry as an Anglican priest.

=== Francesco Coccopalmerio ===
In 2017, in remarks at an ecumenical forum that were later published, Cardinal Francesco Coccopalmerio, president of the Pontifical Council for Legislative Texts, questioned the opinion expressed in Apostolicae curae: "When someone is ordained in the Anglican Church and becomes a parish priest in a community, we cannot say that nothing has happened, that everything is 'invalid'". He cited the fact that Pope Paul VI presented his episcopal ring, as well as a chalice to the Anglican Archbishop of Canterbury Michael Ramsey in 1966 as a recognition of sacraments celebrated in the Anglican Communion:

What does it mean when Pope Paul VI gave a chalice to the Archbishop of Canterbury? If it was to celebrate the Lord's Supper, the Eucharist, it was meant to be done validly, no?” ... This is stronger than the pectoral cross, because a chalice is used not just for drinking but for celebrating the Eucharist. With these gestures the Catholic Church already intuits, recognises a reality.

Coccopalmerio said the current situation is "unclear": "The question of validity (of Anglican orders) is not a matter of law but of doctrine." He believes that the Catholic understanding of validity should be loosened, so that the context is taken into consideration in questions of validity of the sacraments. He points out that some issues that people pretend to be matters of faith are not so in reality, and are no reason for division between churches.

The canon lawyer Edward N. Peters objected to news coverage of Coccopalmerio's views that referred to Leo XIII's "remarks". He said that Apostolicae curae, as a papal bull, was arguably an infallible exercise of papal extraordinary magisterium, or at least "a prominent exercise of the ordinary papal magisterium which coalesced with several centuries of other ordinary exercises of papal-episcopal magisterium in rejecting the validity of Anglican orders to the point that Catholics must hold them invalid", as indicated in the official commentary that accompanied the Apostolic Letter Ad tuendam fidem. Peters observed that the words attributed to the Coccopalmerio do not dispute the 1896 text directly, because the assertion that Anglican orders are invalid does not necessarily mean that when someone is ordained in the Anglican Church nothing has happened.

=== Malines Conversations Group ===
In December 2021, the Malines Conversations Group, an independent Catholic-Anglican dialogues group, released a document titled SORORES IN SPE - Sisters in Hope of the Resurrection: A Fresh Response to the Condemnation of Anglican Orders (1896). The document calls for the overturning of the decision of Apostolicae curae.

Brian Farrell, secretary of the Pontifical Council for Promoting Christian Unity, said that while his Vatican office did not sponsor the group's dialogue, "we are very happy", he said, that the question of Anglican orders was "being examined in the wholly different ecumenical context of today, when so much has been achieved in Anglican-Catholic relations."

== Reaffirmation by the Holy See ==
In 1998, the Congregation for the Doctrine of the Faith issued a doctrinal commentary to accompany Pope John Paul II's apostolic letter Ad tuendam fidem, which established the formula of the profession of faith to be made by those assuming certain offices in the church. The congregation's commentary listed Leo XIII's declaration in Apostolicae curae on the invalidity of Anglican ordinations as an example of "those truths connected to revelation by historical necessity and which are to be held definitively, but are not able to be declared as divinely revealed". Anyone who denies such truths "would be in a position of rejecting a truth of Catholic doctrine and would therefore no longer be in full communion with the Catholic Church".

The continuing authority of Apostolicae curae was affirmed in the essay "The Significance of the Apostolic Constitution Anglicanorum Coetibus" by Gianfranco Ghirlanda, Rector of the Pontifical Gregorian University, released on 9 November 2009. In the essay, approved by the Congregation for the Doctrine of the Faith, Ghirlanda commented that "the ordination of ministers coming from Anglicanism will be absolute, on the basis of the Bull Apostolicae curae of Leo XIII of September 13, 1896".

== Complications ==
Several developments have complicated the possible re-examination of Anglican orders by the Catholic Church. The ordination of women as priests and bishops in the Anglican Communion has been interpreted as expressing an understanding of ordination differing from that of the Catholic Church, which holds that male-only priesthood is a definitive teaching.

Similarly, the decision of some Anglican bodies to extend intercommunion to churches without the traditional understanding of apostolic succession, such as various Lutheran churches (see Porvoo Agreement), also indicates a breaking with apostolic teaching and practice according to the Catholic Church. While the 1999 concordat in the United States between the Episcopal Church and the Evangelical Lutheran Church in America (ELCA) calls for Episcopal bishops to participate in the consecration of ELCA bishops, the agreement did not require the reordination of all ELCA bishops and ministers. This was done so that ELCA ministers ordained by these ELCA bishops could also serve in the Episcopal Church.

Reflecting on the Porvoo Agreement, Jesuit theologian and ecumenist, Edward Yarnold, noted: "I am glad to acknowledge that the drafters of Porvoo made an effort not to contradict ARCIC, but although I have looked again and again, I cannot see that they were successful. The problem once again illustrates the impossibility of deciding which voice speaks for the Anglican Communion." And later in the same article: "What your ecumenical right-hand does must not contradict what is done by the left." In 2010, Cardinal Kurt Koch, President of the Pontifical Council for Promoting Christian Unity, seemed to reiterate the same question at issue: "There are difficulties in the Anglican Communion and not all Anglican communities have the same convictions - that's a great problem for us." In the same interview, Koch added: "When the Anglican Church decides to have females in ministry, we must respect that", but he also stated that showing respect for their clergy does not mean Catholics can pretend the practice fits in with the Catholic understanding of a validly ordained ministry.

Other obstacles were mentioned by Cardinal Walter Kasper, president of the Pontifical Council for Promoting Christian Unity, in a talk at a conference of Anglican bishops and laity at St Albans, England, in 2003. At that meeting he warned against a "mechanical" interpretation of the apostolic succession: "To stand in the apostolic succession is not a matter of an individual historical chain, but of collegial membership in a collegium which, as a whole, goes back to the apostles." He also noted that "a final solution [to recognition of Anglican orders] can be found only in the larger context of full communion in faith, sacramental life and shared apostolic vision". He specifically mentioned obstacles like "lay presidency, the ordination of women, and ethical problems such as abortion and homosexual partnerships". This position (with its emphasis on "doctrinal belief") seems to be in line with the attitude of Eastern Orthodoxy toward Anglican orders. Kallistos Ware, for example, notes in his book, The Orthodox Church:

For Orthodoxy, the validity of ordinations does not depend simply on the fulfillment of certain technical conditions (external possession of the apostolic succession; correct form, matter and intention). The Orthodox also ask: What is the general sacramental teaching of the Christian body in question? What does it believe concerning the inner meaning of the apostolic succession and priesthood? How does it understand the eucharistic presence and sacrifice? Only when these questions have been answered can a decision be made about the validity or otherwise of ordinations. To isolate the problem of valid orders is to go up a blind alley. Realizing this, Anglicans and Eastern Orthodox in their discussions from the 1950s onwards have left the question of valid orders largely to one side, and have concentrated on more substantive and central themes of doctrinal belief.

== See also ==
- Historic episcopate (Anglican views)
