= List of Anglican devotional societies =

Since the time of the Oxford Movement in the Church of England, there have been organizations whose purpose is the propagation of the Catholic Faith within the Anglican Communion. Each of these societies champions one aspect of Ritualism and Anglican doctrine which otherwise is not emphasized by the Anglican churches as a whole. Mostly, these are groups or organisations that are part of the High Church or Anglo-Catholic movement. Many of them are members or associates of the Catholic societies of the Church of England.

== List of societies ==
- Additional Curates Society
- Affirming Catholicism
- Anglican Priests Eucharistic League – (see External links)
- Association of Priests Associate of the Holy House of Walsingham
- The Catholic League
- The Church Union
- Companions of the Shrine of Our Lady of Willesden
- Company of Servers
- Confraternity of the Blessed Sacrament
- Cost of Conscience
- Credo Cymru
- The Federation of Catholic Priests
- Forward in Faith
- Glastonbury Pilgrimage Association
- Guild of All Souls
- Guild of Servants of the Sanctuary – (see External links)
- Saint Martin's League
- The Society for Sacramental Mission
- The Seabury Society – (see External links)
- Society of Catholic Priests
- Society of Mary
- Society of the Holy Cross
- Society of King Charles the Martyr
- Society of Our Lady of Walsingham
- Society of Sacramental Socialists – (see External links)
- The Society under the patronage of Saint Wilfrid and Saint Hilda
- Sodality of Mary, Mother of Priests
- Sodality of the Precious Blood
