= Anglo-Catholic societies =

Anglo-Catholic associations in the Church of England

Anglo-Catholic societies, also known as Catholic societies, are associations within the Anglican Communion which follow in the tradition of Anglo-Catholicism. They may be devotional or theological in nature. Many trace their origins to the Catholic revival in the Church of England which started with the Oxford Movement in the 19th century.

Although some make specific reference to the Church of England in their foundation documents, the vast majority extend their membership and influence to adherents of all member churches of the wider Anglican Communion, and often also to those non-Anglican churches that are in full communion with the See of Canterbury (for example, to the Lutheran Churches through the Porvoo Communion).

== Origins ==
The various societies were founded for many different reasons. Some have specific focuses, such as an emphasis on Mariology, or on liturgical questions (including the Blessed Sacrament), supporting vocations amongst those who share Anglo-Catholic ideology, promoting study, encouraging devotion, or promoting pilgrimage to different sacred sites (especially those associated with Our Lady of Walsingham).

In the nineteenth century, many of the older societies had a role in supporting both clergy and laity who found their Anglo-Catholic practices or beliefs challenged through the civil courts by protestant organisations, as part of the then current disagreement concerning ritualism in the Church of England. Those prosecuted ranged from relatively unknown parochial clergy (such as Fr Arthur Tooth) to prominent leading churchmen of the day (such as Bishop Edward King). The Church Union is an example of a society founded to provide legal and moral support to those Anglo-Catholics persecuted for their beliefs. Today these organisations have assumed different objectives.

== Divisions ==
The issues of the ordination of women and of same-sex marriage have caused disagreement amongst Anglicans, including those of the Anglo-Catholic tradition, and these differences of opinion have had repercussions for the Catholic societies.

Some societies have declared that their membership is open only to male priests, or those opposed to the ordination of women. Other societies have been founded specifically to cater for those who are open to, or support, women's ordination. Some, such as the Confraternity of the Blessed Sacrament, have publicly declared that they are open to membership from those opposed to or in favour of women's ordination, but for the sake of internal unity will only permit male priests to hold office in the society, or to preside at the society's meetings and liturgies. Likewise, some societies have publicly opposed same-sex marriage, while others are expressly LGBTQ+-affirming.

An umbrella organisation entitled Catholic Societies of the Church of England has been founded to unite those societies which oppose the ordination of women.

== Current societies ==
The catholic societies in this table are currently active in the life of the Church of England, and (in most cases) other Anglican provinces.

Society	Founded	Website	Details
Additional Curates Society	1837	Website	Founded by layman Joshua Watson with the purpose of providing funding for assistant clergy in the poor and populous parishes of England and Wales.
Affirming Catholicism	1990	Website	Founded by Rowan Williams, Richard Holloway and others, Affirming Catholicism represents a liberal strand of Anglo-Catholicism. It has been particularly noted for its conviction that Anglo-Catholic belief and practice are compatible with the ordination of women. Many Affirming Catholicism supporters also believe that a committed same-sex relationship should not be a bar to ordination.
Anglo Catholic History Society	2000	Website	Promotes the study of Anglo Catholic history, and the publication of papers and books concerning the catholic movement within Anglicanism. Bishop Geoffrey Rowell was the founding President.
Association of Priests Associate of the Holy House (PAHH)	1931	Website	Originally open only to priests, but now also deacons; priests undertake to offer mass for the Shrine of Our Lady of Walsingham, and enjoy privileges at the shrine; the Priest Administrator of the shrine is, ex officio, Superior General of the Association.
Catholic League	1913	Website	An organisation associated with Anglo-Papalism. Its purpose is to promote formal reunification and full communion of the Church of England with the Roman Catholic Church.
Chaplains of Mary, Mother of the Church (CMMC)	2016	No website	Individual Chaplains style themselves "CMMC", whilst collectively they are known as the College of Chaplains of Mary, Mother of the Church. The College was founded by the Society of Mary (see below), but remains separate from it; although the Superior-General and the Chaplain-General of the SoM hold the same positions in the CMMC, ex officio. The purpose of the College is to provide priests and bishops to officiate at liturgies conducted in the name of the Society of Mary; this is to ensure that all such liturgies are conducted by clergy who are male, and opposed to women's ordination, which is not a general requirement for membership of the Society of Mary. Chaplains of Mary, Mother of the Church (CMMC) may wear distinctive regalia consisting of a pale blue, black, and white collarette, with the seal of CMMC affixed at the apex.
Church Union	1859	Website	Founded to challenge the civil courts system in England on matters of doctrine. It defended Anglo-Catholic priests, notably after the passing of the Public Worship Regulation Act 1874.
Companions of the Shrine of Our Lady of Willesden	2014	Website	The Shrine was founded by the fifteenth century, and possibly much earlier. Following dissolution at the Reformation, it was re-established early in the twentieth century, with a replacement image commissioned in 1925. Regular pilgrimage was restored, and in 2014 the Companionate was re-established. There are Lay-Companions and Priest-Companions. The governing body is a Chapter consisting of at least six Chapter Priests, one of whom is (ex officio) the Vicar of St Mary's, Willesden. The head of the Companionate is an Episcopal Patron.
Confraternity of the Blessed Sacrament	1862	Website	Upholds the real presence of Christ in the Eucharist. It was founded during the Victorian era by Thomas Thellusson Carter, a priest who was prominent in the Catholic Revival.
Cost of Conscience	1969	Website	Describes itself as an association concerned with doctrinal matters and upholding traditional Anglicanism. It is strongly critical of and opposed to liberal Anglican theology.
Ecumenical Friends of Fátima Association	2001	Website	Encourages devotion to the Virgin Mary under the title of Our Lady of Fátima. Organises pilgrimages to Portugal. It was founded by Edwin Barnes, Bishop of Richborough.
Federation of Catholic Priests	1917	Website	It was founded to campaign for the positions of Anglo-Catholicism in "faith, worship and discipline" at the Church Assembly and continues to do so at the General Synod.
Fidelium London	2025	Website	Fidelium is a lay-led network of Anglo-Catholic young adults (ages 18–35) in London, founded in 2025 under the patronage of the Bishop of Fulham. It organises liturgical, social, and educational events and operates a system of parish representatives in 15 traditionalist parishes, who act as local contacts and help connect participants with the wider network. The society publishes a quarterly events programme covering both its own activities and those of affiliated parishes and welcomes people from all church traditions.
Forward in Faith	1992	Website	One of the more prominent contemporary societies. Promotes the Anglo-Catholic position in liturgy, ecclesiology and Christology contrary to liberalism. 800 priests are members.
Glastonbury Pilgrimage Association	1926	Website	In its first decades was known as the West of England Pilgrimage Association. Organises annual pilgrimages to Glastonbury, which claims to be the oldest Marian shrine in England and is associated with stories of St. Joseph of Arimathea.
Guild of All Souls	1873	Website	Purpose is to pray for the souls of the Christian faithful departed and for teaching the doctrine of the Communion of Saints. Provides Requiem vestments to those who cannot afford them.
Guild of Servants of the Sanctuary	1898	Website	The GSS was founded as an association of altar servers. Its purpose is to provide for their development and to encourage more frequent attendance at the Holy Eucharist. Open to both men and women, but appoints only male priests as chaplains and priests-associate.
Order of Our Lady of Walsingham	1953	Website	An Order of "Members" (originally "Dames" and "Clerks" according to gender) appointed for service to the Shrine of Our Lady of Walsingham. Membership is by invitation only.
Memorial of Merit of King Charles the Martyr	1911	Website	Founded by Captain Henry Stuart Wheatly-Crowe and the Earl of Strathmore and Kinghorne, with the approval of Archbishop Randall Davidson and King Edward VII, with members admitted to the grade of Companion as a reward for meritorious service to the Anglican Church. Members are Companions, wear elaborate regalia, and are entered on a roll of honour. The governing Chapter consists of a Chancellor, a Registrar, and any additional co-opted members.
Society for the Maintenance of the Faith	1873	Website	Founded "to promote and maintain Catholic teaching and practice" within the Church of England, principally by acquiring private patronage of parishes. It is currently patron of 90 livings.
Society of Catholic Priests	1994	Europe; Australia; America	Membership in the SCP UK is open to all Anglican priests who accept the Anglican Communion as part of the "one, holy, catholic, and apostolic church", who recognise the ordination of women priests, believe in the real presence and who uphold the traditional view of the seven sacraments.
Society of King Charles the Martyr	1894	Website	A devotional society dedicated to and under the patronage of king Charles I of England. It seeks to promote knowledge of his life and observance of his feastday on 30 January.
Society of Mary	1931	Website	Founded as two Marian societies merged. Its purpose is to honour the Blessed Virgin Mary, to spread devotion to her and take her as a model in purity, relationships and family life.
Society of the Holy Cross (SSC)	1855	Website	A congregation of Anglo-Catholic priests in the wider Anglican Communion. It is one of the oldest and most prominent societies coming out of the Anglo-Catholic Revival. Known as "SSC", the initials of its name in Latin, Societas Sanctae Crucis. Membership is open to male priests only.
Society of Our Lady of Egmanton	1977	Website	Promotes pilgrimage to a Marian shrine in Nottinghamshire known as Our Lady of Egmanton. The devotion is of medieval origin and the pilgrimage was restored in 1929.
Society of Our Lady of Walsingham	1925	Website	Promotes pilgrimage to, and intercession for, the Shrine of Our Lady of Walsingham. The devotion is of medieval origin and the pilgrimage was restored in 1922.
Society of Sacramental Socialists	2005	Website	Anglo-Catholic Anglicans who believe that socialism, and corresponding social action, are integral to their spiritual life. Their badge is a red star, representing both socialism and the 'Oriens' (Christ the Morning Star).
Sodality of Mary, Mother of Priests (SMMS)	2016	Website	A congregation of Anglo-Catholic priests in the wider Anglican Communion. It is one of the newer societies within the Anglo-Catholic movement. Known as "SMMS", the initials of its name in Latin, Sodalitas Mariae, Matris Sacerdotum. Membership is open to both male and female priests, with associate membership available to laity also. Its spirituality is based upon the Vincentian movement.
Sodality of the Precious Blood	TBC	No website	A group of priests ordained in the Church of England who support Anglo-Papalism. They describe themselves as upholding orthodoxy and the life of celibacy. Associated with the Catholic League.
The Saint Kenelm Pilgrimage Society	2018	website	Describes itself as an association concerned with the veneration of Saint Kenelm, it successfully restored the ancient pilgrimage to Winchcombe, Gloucestershire in 2019 which is held annually. It is proud to be upholding traditional Anglo-Catholism and its traditions within the Cotswolds.

== Former societies ==
The catholic societies in this table are no longer active.

Society	Founded	Closed	Details
Guild of St Matthew	1877	1909	Founded by Stewart Headlam for the promotion of Anglo-Catholicism and socialism. It has been claimed as the first explicitly socialist organisation in England.
Saint Martin's League	1877	1902	Founded by Arthur Stanton for the promotion of Anglo-Catholicism amongst postal workers.

== See also ==
- Ritualism
- Oxford Movement
- The Society (Church of England)
