= Ritualism in the Church of England =

Emphasis on the rituals and liturgical ceremony of the church

Ritualism, in the history of Christianity, refers to an emphasis on the rituals and liturgical ceremonies of the Church, specifically the Christian practice of Holy Communion.

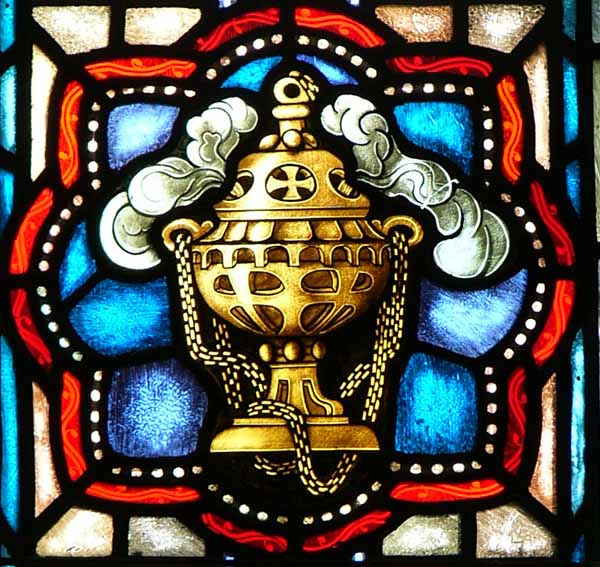
Image of a thurible in a stained glass window, St. Ignatius Church, Chestnut Hill, Massachusetts

In the Anglican church in the 19th century, the role of ritual became a contentious matter. The debate over this topic was also associated with struggles between the High Church and Low Church movements.

== Definition ==
In Anglicanism, the term ritualist is often used to describe the revival of the second generation Oxford Movement/Anglo-Catholic/High Church, which sought to reintroduce a range of Roman Catholic liturgical practices to the Church of England. Ritualism is also seen as a controversial term (i.e., rejected by some of those to whom ritualism is applied).

=== Common arguments ===
Arguments about ritualism in the Church of England were often shaped by opposing (and often unannounced) attitudes towards the concept of sola scriptura and the nature of the authority of the Bible for Christians.

==== For ====
Those who support the ritualist outlook in the Church of England have often argued that the adoption of key elements of Roman Catholic ritual would:

- Give liturgical expression to the ecclesiological belief that the Church of England is more Catholic than Protestant;
- Give liturgical expression to a belief in the Real Presence and concomitantly that the Eucharist is the most important act of church worship and should be the norm;
- Be the most effective vehicle for giving expression to the worship of heaven as described in the Book of Revelation in which the use of white robes and incense in a setting of considerable beauty is described;
- Be a liturgical expression of the story in the book of Gospel of Matthew of the response of the Magi to the birth of Jesus who brought the gifts of gold, frankincense and myrrh as an act of adoration;
- Enable worshippers to use all of their senses in order to worship with the whole person and not just the mind;
- Be incarnational by placing emphasis on liturgical action and physical objects. Those in favour of ritualism argue that it draws attention to the importance that Christians should attach to the belief that, in Jesus, "the Word became flesh" (John 1). Those things are part of what God makes and saves and are not repudiated by him;
- Be the most effective form of worship for cultures that are either highly visual or have low literacy rates;
- Be an expression of the human response to God that calls on humans to offer their best in worship as a way of expressing the value ("worth") that they place on God. Worship is, etymologically, "worth-ship".

==== Against ====
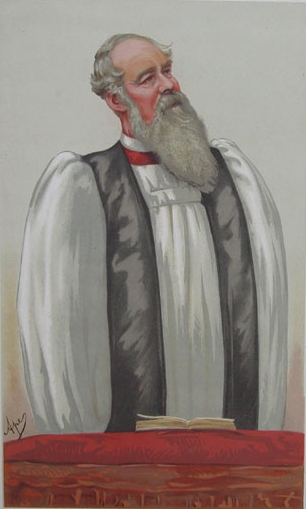
Bishop Ryle of Liverpool – a leading critic of ritualism – by Carlo Pellegrini, 1881

Those who oppose ritualism in the Church of England have generally argued that it:

- Promotes idolatry by encouraging worshippers to focus on ritual objects and actions rather than the things they are meant to symbolise;
- Constitutes an attempt to wrest the Church of England from its Protestant identity;
- Constitutes a downgrading of the significance of preaching and biblical exposition in regular Christian worship;
- Encourages an idolatrous attitude to the Eucharist because ritualism is predicated on a belief in the Real Presence;
- Uses excessive elaborations in worship that cannot be justified on the basis of the descriptions of worship in the gospels, the Acts of the Apostles, or the Epistles in the New Testament. The robes used in the worship of heaven described in the Book of Revelation are plain white;
- Undermines a key Protestant belief that no human actions, even worship that has been precisely and carefully offered, can be of any value when it comes to being justified in the eyes of God: worship should be an unfussy, obedient, penitent, grateful, and spontaneously joyful response to the experience of being saved by faith alone in Jesus. Ritual and tradition are merely human inventions;
- Has often impeded the understanding of the gospel by wrapping up Christian worship in indecipherable symbolic acts;
- Is not beautiful as proponents claim but rather gaudy and distracting from contemplative worship.

== Ritualist controversies in the 19th century ==
=== Origins ===
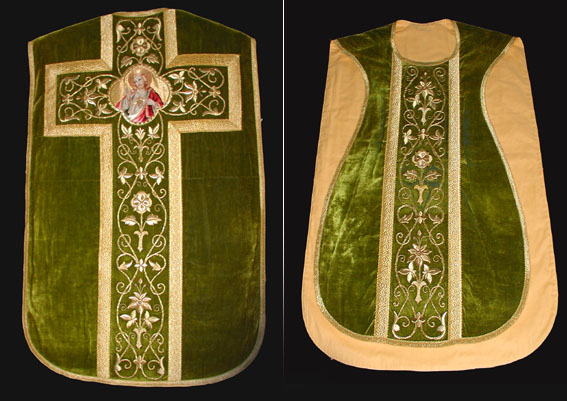
A "fiddleback" chasuble, the use of which by a priest could lead to prosecution

The development of ritualism in the Church of England was mainly associated with what is commonly called "second generation" Anglo-Catholicism (i.e., the Oxford Movement as developed after 1845 when John Henry Newman abandoned the Church of England to become a Roman Catholic). Some scholars argued that it was almost inevitable that some of the leaders of Anglo-Catholicism would turn their attention to questions of liturgy and ritual and started to champion the use of practices and forms of worship more commonly associated with Roman Catholicism. However, there was only limited enthusiasm among ritualists to introduce the widespread use of Latin in the liturgy, which was the norm in the Roman Catholic Church before Vatican II.

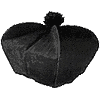
Traditional biretta

The leaders of the first generation of the Anglo-Catholic revival or Oxford Movement (i.e., Newman, Edward Bouverie Pusey, and John Keble) had been primarily concerned with theological and ecclesiological questions and had little concern with questions of ritual. They championed the view that the fundamental identity of the Church of England was Catholic rather than Protestant. They argued that Anglicans were bound by obedience to use the Book of Common Prayer. "Tract 3" of the Tracts for the Times series had strenuously argued against any revision of the Book of Common Prayer, viewing its use as a matter of absolute obligation. Even Tract 90, which analysed the 39 Articles, was more concerned with the theological dimension of the issue. It gave little attention to the question of altering current liturgical practice in the Church of England.

The ecclesiological questions gave rise to an interest in giving liturgical expression to the theological conviction that the Church of England had sustained a fundamentally Catholic character after the English Reformation. In some circles, the shift of focus to the question of liturgy proved as provocative as had been the theological assertions of the first generation of Anglo-Catholicism.

The clearest illustration of the shift that took place within Anglo-Catholicism from theological to liturgical questions is to be found in Pusey's attitude towards ritualism. Pusey, the only pre-eminent first-generation leader of Anglo-Catholicism to survive into the second generation, had no sympathy with the preoccupation with ritual. However, when priests started to be prosecuted and imprisoned as a result of the Public Worship Regulation Act 1874, Pusey was quick to show his support for those who were prosecuted.

=== Early controversies in the 19th century ===
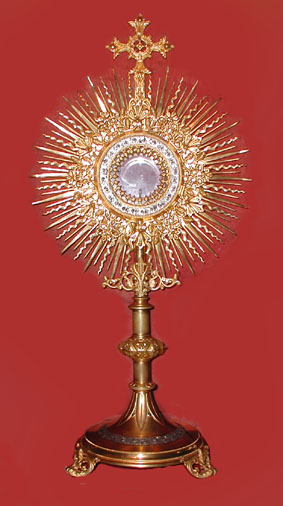
Neo-Gothic "solar" monstrance used for Benediction.

==== "Bells and smells": the controversial ritual practices ====
From the 1850s to the 1890s, several liturgical practices espoused by many ritualists led to some occasional and intense local controversies, some of which led to prosecutions (most notably as a result of the Public Worship Regulation Act 1874). Those considered most important by adherents of the Catholic movement were known as the "six points":

- the use of Eucharistic vestments such as the chasuble, stole, alb and maniple
- the use of a thurible and incense
- the use of "lights" (especially the practice of putting six candles on the high altar)
- the use of unleavened (wafer) bread in communion
- eastward facing celebration of the Eucharist (when the priest celebrates facing the altar from the same side as the people (i.e., the priest faces east with the people instead of standing at the "north side" of the "table" as required by the 1662 Book of Common Prayer))
- the mixing of sacramental wine with water

Other contentious practices included:

- the use of Catholic terminology such as describing the Eucharist as the "Mass"
- the use of bells at the elevation of the host
- making the sign of the cross
- the use of liturgical processions
- the decoration of churches with statues of saints, pictures of religious scenes, and icons
- the veneration of the Blessed Virgin Mary and the practice of the invocation of the saints
- the practice of Benediction of the Blessed Sacrament
- the use of the words of Benedictus at the end of the Sanctus in the eucharistic prayer
- the use of the words of the Agnus Dei in the Eucharist

In regards to the "north side" celebration, at the time of the Reformation, altars were fixed against the east end of the church, and the priests would celebrate the Mass standing at the front of the altar. Beginning with the rubrics of the Second Prayer Book of Edward VI published in 1552, and through the 1662 Book of Common Prayer (which prevailed for almost 300 years), the priest is directed to stand "at the north syde of the Table." This was variously interpreted over the years to mean the north side of the front of a fixed communion table, the north end of a fixed table (i.e., facing south), the north side of a free-standing table (presumably facing those intending to receive the Elements who would be sitting in the quire stalls opposite), or at the north end of a free-standing table lengthwise in the chancel (facing a congregation seated in the nave). The last option copies the practice of the Early Church when the celebrant stood before a small stone or marble table, usually rectangular, facing the nave.

The ritualist movement (see Cambridge Camden Society) also played a substantial role in promoting:

- the restoration of chancels in parish churches; and
- the use of robed choirs seated in the chancel accompanied by a pipe organ rather than by a Church band and seated in a west gallery at the back of the church.

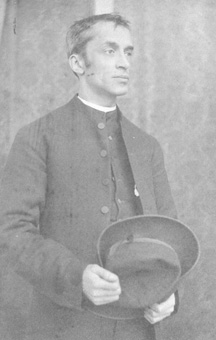
Father Arthur Tooth SSC who was prosecuted for ritualist practices

The prosecution and conviction of Arthur Tooth in 1876, Sidney Faithorn Green in 1879, and Richard William Enraght in 1880, illustrate the controversies caused by these liturgical practices. The prosecutions, which were often instigated by the Church Association, gave considerable impetus to the foundation and work of the English Church Union. The Society of the Holy Cross (SSC) played a crucial role in championing and developing the use of elements of proscribed Catholic ritual in Anglicanism.

==== Perception of ritualism as a threat to English identity ====
For many who opposed ritualism, the key concern was to defend what they saw as the fundamentally Protestant identity of the Church of England. This was also not just a matter of an ecclesiological argument; for many, there was a sense that Catholic worship was somehow "un-English". Catholicism was deeply associated with cultural identities that historically had been treated with suspicion by many English people, especially the Spanish, French, and Irish.

For an ideological defence of this position, it was argued that English identity was closely linked with England's history as a Protestant country that, after the Reformation, had played a key role in opposing Catholic powers in Continental Europe, especially Spain and then France. In the minds of such people, Protestantism was inextricably identified with anti-despotic values and Catholicism with autocracy that, in the religious arena, hid behind the "disguise" of complicated rituals whose meaning deliberately lacked transparency. The opposition to ritualism, therefore, had a deeply cultural and symbolic significance that extended far beyond purely theological concerns.

Ritualists themselves were often eager to try and present the "Englishness" of the ritual they championed by predominantly keeping English as the language of the liturgy and reconstructing Anglo-Catholicism as a recovery of pre-Reformation Catholic forms that were specifically English; a revival of interest in the Sarum Rite (the pre-Reformation Catholic liturgy of Salisbury) was sparked off by the Ritualist movement. This tendency was also often expressed as the revival in the use of the pre-Reformation Gothic forms rather than the Baroque, the latter of which was more closely linked in the minds of many with specifically continental and Counter Reformation forms.

==== Ritualism and Christian socialism ====
Although ritualism had an aesthetic and ideological appeal for many in the cultural elite, as well as a cognate relationship with the Gothic Revival, the idea that it was inextricably linked with an inclination towards political despotism was a misapprehension. Ritualism had an appeal for many who were politically conservative and had supporters highly placed in the establishment (i.e., Viscount Halifax and the 4th Marquess of Bath). However, the outlook of many of the ritualist clergy themselves, many of whom inevitably operated in some of the most deprived communities in England, resulted in them becoming politically radicalised, with some becoming ardent Christian socialists.

==== Anti-ritualism and "muscular Christianity" ====
In the spectrum of hostility that it aroused, ritualism also provoked in some of its opponents a reaction that saw its theatricality and its aestheticism as symptoms of "effeminacy". A typical charge was that ritualistic clergy were "man milliners", who were more concerned with lace and brocade than doctrine. Adverse reaction to this played a significant role in the evolution of the Broad and Low Church enthusiasm for muscular Christianity.

=== Ritualism and outreach to the unchurched urban poor ===
One of the key ideological justifications used by many of the early ritualists, apart from the fact that it was a symbolic way of affirming their belief in the essentially Catholic nature of Anglicanism, was the argument that it provided a particularly effective medium for bringing Christianity to the poorest "slum parishes" of the Church of England.

It was argued that ritual and aesthetically impressive liturgy did not only provide a powerful contrast to the drabness of the lives of the poor, but its emphasis on symbol and action rather than word was a more effective medium for spreading Christian faith in areas with poor literacy rates than the highly cerebral and logocentric worship that focused on the Book of Common Prayer. This argument may have had some merits, but, very often, the respect that the most successful ritualists often gained in the highly impoverished communities they went to serve was based on the fact that they had expressed a genuine pastoral concern for the poor among whom they lived.

The argument for ritualism in Anglicanism was also based on the analogy of the success of the Roman Catholic Church among the highly impoverished Irish migrant communities in the urban areas of England. It was argued by some that ritual played a key role in the growth of the Roman Catholic Church among the poor. However, the use of ritual probably played little more than a subsidiary role in the success of the Catholic Church in this area. Instead, its success was probably largely due to a special cultural identity that many Irish migrants felt with the Roman Catholic Church as one of the few institutions that they encountered in diaspora that was also a feature of life in their homeland.

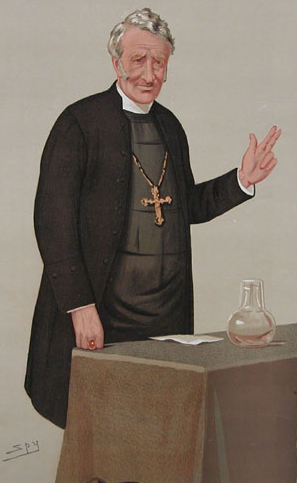
Edward King, Bishop of Lincoln, by Leslie Ward 1890. King was prosecuted for ritualist practices.

=== Legacy of the controversies ===
The ritualists' use of vestments and wafer bread have become widespread, even normative, in the Church of England for much of the 20th century.

Although many members of the Church of England today still feel uncomfortable or sceptical about certain "Catholic" or "Romish" liturgical practices, in the late 19th century, using incense, wearing vestments, putting candles on the altar, having the mixed cup, making the sign of the Cross over the congregation, and using unleavened (wafer) bread in the Eucharist could spark riots and lead to the prosecution and imprisonment of priests, such as the prosecution of Edward King, Bishop of Lincoln, between 1888 and 1890. The lasting legacy is that the Ritualists won; the current liturgical style in its various manifestations in almost all Anglican parishes worldwide is much closer to the way Mass was celebrated 500 years ago even in Low Church and "mid-range" parishes.

== See also ==
- Anglicanism
- Anglo-Catholicism
- The Book of Common Prayer
- Cambridge Camden Society
- Charles Walker (liturgist) (Author/Editor of The Ritual Reason Why)
- Christian Social Union
- Church Association
- Richard William Enraght (prosecuted for Ritualist practices)
- T. Pelham Dale (prosecuted for Ritualist practices)
- Percy Dearmer
- James DeKoven
- George Anthony Denison
- Robert William Radclyffe Dolling
- English Missal
- Charles Fuge Lowder
- Alexander Heriot Mackonochie
- English Church Union
- English Hymnal
- Laudianism
- Legalism (theology)
- Liturgical Movement
- Gothic Revival
- William Augustus Mühlenberg
- Oxford Movement
- Public Worship Regulation Act 1874
- John Purchas
- John Charles Ryle
- SSC (Society of the Holy Cross)
- Arthur Tooth (prosecuted for Ritualist practices)
- Vestments controversy
- Walsingham

== Bibliography ==
- James Bentley: Ritualism and Politics in Victorian Britain: Oxford: Oxford University Press, 1978: ISBN 0-19-826714-2
- Lida Ellsworth: Charles Lowder and the Ritualist Movement: London: Darton, Longman and Todd, 1982: ISBN 0-232-51535-2
- Gary Graber: Ritual Legislation in the Victorian Church of England: Antecedents and Passage of the Public Worship Regulation Act 1874: San Francisco: Mellen Research University Press, 1993: ISBN 0-7734-2216-1
- David Hilliard: "UnEnglish and Unmanly: Anglo-Catholicism and Homosexuality": Victorian Studies: (Winter 1982): 181–210.
- Kenneth Hylson-Smith: High Churchmanship in the Church of England: From the Sixteenth to the Late Twentieth Centuries: Edinburgh: T&T Clark, 1993: ISBN 0-567-09623-8
- John Shelton Reed: Glorious Battle: The Cultural Politics of Victorian Anglo-Catholicism: Nashville & London: Vanderbilt University Press, 1996: ISBN 0-8265-1274-7
- Frank Reynolds: Martyr of Ritualism: Father MacKonochie of St Alban's, Holborn: London: Faber and Faber, 1965.
- Martin Wellings, Evangelicals Embattled: Responses of Evangelicals in the Church of England to Ritualism, Darwinism and Theological Liberalism (1890–1930): Carlisle: Paternoster Press, 2003: ISBN 1-84227-049-4
- James Whisenant: A Fragile Unity: Anti-Ritualism and the Division of Anglican Evangelicalism in the Nineteenth Century: Carlisle: Paternoster Press, 2003: ISBN 1-84227-105-9
- Nigel Yates: Anglican Ritualism in Victorian Britain: (1830–1910). Oxford: Oxford University Press, 1999: ISBN 0-19-826989-7
