= Richard Enraght =

- Born: Richard William Enraght; 23 February 1837; Moneymore, County Londonderry, Ireland
- Died: 21 September 1898 (aged 61); Bintree, Norfolk, England
- Spouse: Dorothea
- Children: 7

Ecclesiastical career
- Church: Church of England
- Ordained: 1861 (deacon); 1862 (priest)

Richard William Enraght SSC (23 February 1837 – 21 September 1898) was an Irish-born Church of England priest of the late nineteenth century. He was influenced by the Oxford Movement and was included amongst the priests commonly called "Second Generation" Anglo-Catholics.

Enraght believed ritualism in worship was essential for adherence to the Church of England's Catholic tradition. His religious practices and publications on Catholic worship and Church-State relationship led him into conflict with church authorities and were prosecuted under the Public Worship Regulation Act.

Enraght's practices included adoration of the Blessed Sacrament, the use of eucharistic candles, wearing of chasuble and alb, the use of wafer bread in Holy Communion, the ceremonial mixing of water and communion wine, making the sign of the Cross towards the congregation during the Holy Communion service, bowing his head at the Gloria, and allowing the Agnus Dei to be sung, all of which his Bishop forbade. These practices resulted in Enraght being prosecuted by the Church Association's lawyers and put to trial by the presiding Judge, Lord Penzance.

Enraght refused to attend his own trial on grounds of conscience. He was found guilty and received the maximum penalty under the Act: arrest, imprisonment and dismissal from his parish. The Oxford Dictionary of the Christian Church states, "This attempt at suppressing Ritualism so discredited the Act (in fact it created Anglo-Catholic martyrs) that it led to its being regarded as virtually obsolete." In 2006, the Brighton & Hove City Council honoured Enraght as a "Priest, fighter for religious freedom."

== Ministry ==
=== Early life and work ===
Little is known of Richard Enraght's early life; he was born on 23 February 1837 at Moneymore in County Londonderry, Ireland. At the age of 23, in 1860, he graduated with Bachelor of Arts from Trinity College Dublin. The following year he was ordained a Deacon at Gloucester Cathedral by the Bishop of Gloucester and Bristol (these two dioceses were combined between 1836 and 1897). He served as a Curate at St Bartholomew Church, Corsham, Wiltshire, and was ordained into the priesthood in 1862.

== Career ==
After spending three years at Corsham, Enraght continued his ministry at St Luke the Evangelist, Sheffield in 1864. Here he revealed his commitment to the Anglo-Catholic cause in the pamphlets, To the Poor the Gospel is Preached in which he criticised the pew-rent system for barring the poor from Churches throughout the country. He also criticised "Bible-Ritualism", that is, over-reliance on scriptural authority for aspects of ceremonial worship. From Sheffield he moved to Wrawby in Lincolnshire for one year in 1866 to continue his ministry. In 1867 Enraght travelled to the south coast of England to take up a curacy under Arthur Wagner, the Tractarian vicar of St Paul's Church, Brighton and "Father" of the Catholic Revival in Brighton.

=== Brighton and "the South Coast Religion" ===
The Anglican Church in Brighton was heavily influenced by the Oxford Movement, to an extent unparalleled elsewhere in the country apart from London. In Anglo-Catholic circles, Brighton became associated with London, as in the collective title of "London-Brighton and South Coast Religion", a play on a railway company's name "London, Brighton and South Coast Railway". The railway, coincidentally or otherwise, linked all the large and growing centres of Anglo-Catholic worship spreading from London to Brighton and then east and west along coast of Sussex to the neighbouring counties of Kent and Hampshire.

Wagner held Tractarian opinions since his time at Cambridge University. He was the leading light of the Catholic Revival in Brighton, with prolific church and school building, and generous charitable works of building 400 houses for the poor, all at his own expense. Wagner was the subject of critical debates in the House of Commons for his liturgical practices. Legislation was proposed to halt the Catholic Revival in Brighton by taking away Wagner's authority to install Anglo-Catholic priests as vicars in the five churches which he had financed.

The local press and the Brighton Protestant Defence Association (the forerunner of the Church Association) created a hostile reception of ritualistic priests. The Brighton Gazette was vitriolic about any clergy who adhered to the English Catholic Tradition. In 1873 the newspaper reported critically that Fr. Wagner had refused in court to answer questions that would "involve him to breach the confessional". Following this article, Wagner was physically assaulted on the streets of Brighton; his assailants went to prison. Fr. Wagner, characteristically, supported their wives and families at his own expense. Wagner was not the only priest to suffer violence in Brighton. Fr Thomas Perry, from the most advanced ritualist church in Brighton, St Michael & All Angels, stood alone at a Brighton public meeting and defended Wagner's cause. He too was to suffer at the hands of the mob by being beaten-up for his courageous stance.

In another parish in Brighton, at St James Church, Fr. John Purchas was prosecuted for using vestments and the eastward position. His trial at the Court of Arches took three years to conclude, and he refused to attend it. It resulted in the Church of England's paying £7,661 in total costs as Purchas had placed all his property into his wife's name. He was unable to pay the costs of £2,096 the Court awarded against him. To appreciate the scale of these costs, a house in Portslade could be rented for £13 a year in 1872.

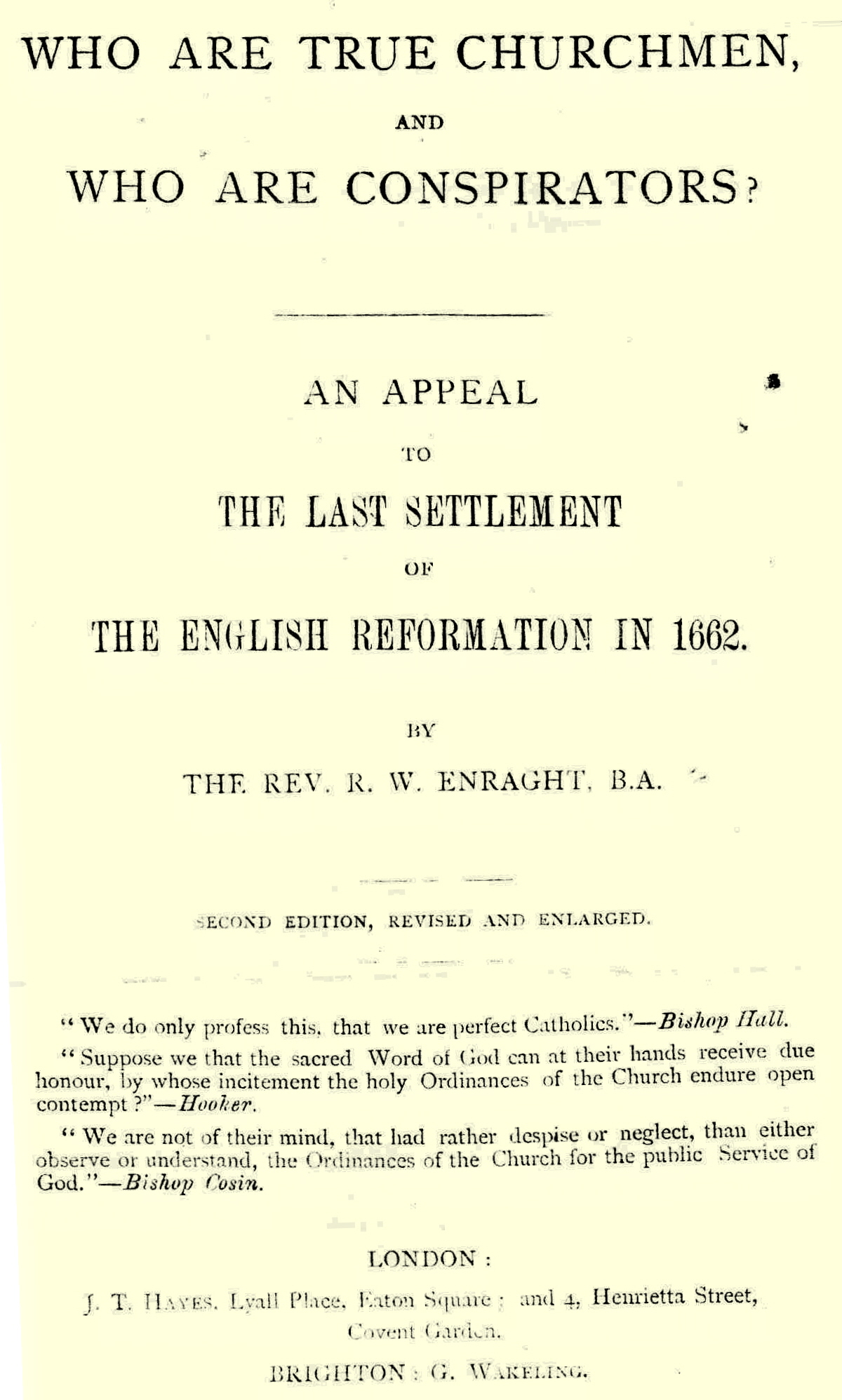
The 1870 title page of Reverend Richard Enraght's "Who are True Churchmen, Who are Conspirators?" which opposed the campaign of the Church Association

While serving under Wagner and sharing his Anglo-Catholic views, Enraght wrote the pamphlet "Who are True Churchmen and Who are Conspirators?". It was distributed nationally. In The Last Settlement of English Reformation in 1662, he stated that he had proved that the English Church was both Catholic and Reformed.

Enraght directed his text at the Church Association to counter their campaign against Anglo-Catholic priests:

I have now, then, I think, sufficiently demonstrated what I undertook to prove. I have proved that the last Revision and Settlement in 1662 of the Formularies of the English Church, by which the Bishops and Clergy are bound, both by their Ordination promises and by Act of Parliament, was distinctly Catholic. I have proved, therefore, that the Catholic-minded clergy of the English Church alone are in the right, that the charge of "Romanizing" and unfaithfulness to their Church, so persistently brought against them because of their faithful adherence to Catholic truth and practice, is a grievous slander, and that the only consistent course for their opponents to adopt—in order, if they can, to put themselves in the right—is to endeavour to get the Formularies of the Church altered in a “Protestant” direction, and so to alter the basis on which we now stand. Until this be accomplished, which God forbid! Catholic-minded Churchmen, and they only, truly represent the mind of the English Church. All others are simply, more or less, conspirators against "the principles of the" English "Reformation" in its latest, and therefore most carefully considered, development. Consequently, it is obvious that the efforts so strenuously made in the present day by nominal Churchmen of Puritan sentiments to persecute and, if possible, put down the Catholic-minded clergy of the English Church, under a pretended zeal for the principles of the English Reformation, wear an appearance of gross hypocrisy. Puritans, ever since the first dawn of "the Reformation", have been in the Church of England only on sufferance. If any are to be restrained, it must not be those clergy who loyally carry out the principles of the Church which the Revisers of 1662 so strenuously maintained against all attacks, but any who (although many of them holding position and preferment within the Church) use their position and influence, contrary to their Ordination promises, to carry out the work of the Nonconformists of 1662, and undermine the Reformation principles for which the Revisers of 1662 contended, and which they have preserved in the Formularies of the Church.

The Union Review, Literary Churchman, Church Review and Church Times gave positive reviews to Enraght's essay "Who are True Churchmen and Who are Conspirators".

=== Priest in charge of Portslade by Sea with Hangleton ===
St Andrew Church, Portslade

In 1871, after serving as a curate to Fr. Wagner, the vicar of St Paul's, Brighton, Reverend Richard William Enraght continued his ministry at St Andrew's Church, Portslade by Sea. He was appointed Priest in Charge of the District Church of St Andrew, Portslade by Sea with St Helen's Church, Hangleton, by the Vicar of St Nicolas Church, Portslade who, at that time, held the patronage of St Andrew's. Enraght's appointment was not without controversy.

The vicar of the neighbouring Parish of Southwick appealed to the Bishop of Chichester. He questioned the authority of the Vicar of Portslade to make the appointment of a priest to Portslade by Sea. As Portslade was only three miles from Brighton with good railway links, Fr. Enraght SSC was able to continue as an officer of the Brighton Branch of the Society of the Holy Cross. This was described by its national leadership "as one of the most promising [branches] and was carrying on a vigorous campaign in Brighton." While living in Brighton and Portslade, Enraght also served as the organising secretary for the National Association for the Promotion of Freedom of Worship and campaigned for the abolition of "pew-rents." St Andrew Church, Portslade (built in 1864), was one of the first churches in Sussex never to have had "pew-rents".

In Portslade, Fr. Enraght continued to publish pamphlets and letters to The Brighton Gazette promoting adherence to the English Catholic Tradition within the Church of England. As priest in charge of Portslade,Enraght published the pamphlets "Catholic Worship", that promoted the importance and necessity of ritual in worship, and "The Real Presence and Holy Scripture", which the Church Times described as "A masterly exposition of the texts which more directly relate to the Blessed Eucharist".

Such writings put Enraght in confrontation with the Brighton Gazette, a local paper that supported the Public Worship Regulation Act and tried to ensure no hint of ritualism took place in local worship. The Brighton Gazette's editorial of 8 January 1874 was titled "Protestant Reaction", and sub-titled, 'a warning to polemics' from which these quotes are taken; "True Protestants can scarcely desire the loss of power and influence this would involve and the great help it would be to the Papists to re-establish their supremacy in Britain, through the Ritualists." The Gazette also accused Fr. Enraght of Puseyism (used here as a term of abuse) and of trying to turn the local St Nicolas Church School in Portslade into a Puseyite school.

Another example of the Gazette's biased reporting, for Thursday 21 May 1874:

The Revd R. W. Enraght of Portslade has given notice of his intentions to hold a “Retreat”-our readers will not have forgotten what sort of things these "retreats" are – at Lancing College in August next. The rev. gentleman's name appears in the roll of the Confraternity of the Blessed Sacrament for 1872, so that here we get another peep into the interior economy of those notorious "Woodard Schools", of which Lancing College is the headquarters.

In 1874 the Government, under the leadership of Disraeli, with the backing of both primates and many bishops, decided to crush ritualism in the Church of England by passing the Public Worship Regulation Act to control religious belief.

Wagner, Purchas, Enraght and the many other Brighton Anglo-Catholic priests all carried out their ministries to large sympathetic congregations. Against the backdrop of public support for Anglo-Catholic priests the local press continued in their campaign to use the Public Worship Regulation Act to rid ritualism from the churches of Brighton. From the Brighton Gazette's editorial for 23 April 1874 on the topic of the Public Worship Regulation Act: "Let us have the law obeyed and let there be an easy mode of redress from offending clergyman".

In the winter of 1874 Fr. Enraght left Portslade to take on a new challenge in the City of Birmingham as Vicar of Holy Trinity, Bordesley, an area much like Brighton where the Church Association were very active. Portslade was a good stepping stone in Enraght's ministry as this was his first Parish where he had sole responsibility for the parishioners and being so close to Brighton he was able to maintain his links with the Brighton Branch of the SSC and with his former Vicar, Fr. Wagner.

=== Bordesley, Birmingham and London ===
Holy Trinity Church, Bordesley

In 1874 at Holy Trinity Church, Bordesley, the Rev. Richard William Enraght succeeded a man who was a Tractarian. In addition, he was friends with two neighbouring Birmingham priests who celebrated Anglo-Catholic tradition, James and Thomas Pollock. The Pollock brothers and Enraght were all graduates of Trinity College Dublin.

An indication of Fr. Enraght's popularity was the attendances of Sunday morning Holy Communion services, with a congregation of between 400 and 500. The Sunday Evensong with sermon often regularly attracted 700 to 800 parishioners. With his parish's support, Enraght introduced weekday celebrations of Holy Communion.

The Church Association, a radical group of Protestants who had unlimited funds to mount prosecutions, were active in Birmingham as they had been in Brighton. The Church Association sought to separate priests from their congregations by registering its members in these parishes. By then registering complaints as "aggrieved parishioners", they could bring about the prosecution of clergy under the new PWR Act. In one parish in the north of England, the Association bribed parishioners to speak out against their priest; in one instance, a churchwarden was offered £10,000 to give evidence. That amount was a fortune in the Victorian era.

The Church Association was aggressive in its goal to "uphold the Principles and Order of the United Church of England and Ireland." It fought ritualism by legal action in many localities. Bishop Magee (a non-ritualistic Bishop and future Archbishop of York) called the Church Association, the "Persecution Company Limited". They employed special agents to seek out ritualist priests. Other opponents of the Church Association called it "the Church Ass".

In London, Fr. Charles Fuge Lowder, the founder of the Society of the Holy Cross, was threatened with prosecution under the Public Worship Regulation Act. Intervention by the Archbishop of Canterbury saved him from legal action. The archbishop feared the reaction to such a high-profile Anglo-Catholic's being put on trial.

== Prosecution ==
Enraght's practices at Holy Trinity, Bordesley, included adoration of the Blessed Sacrament, the use of eucharistic candles, wearing the chasuble and alb, using wafers in Holy Communion, ceremonial mixing of water and communion wine, making the sign of the Cross towards the congregation during the Holy Communion service, bowing his head at the Gloria, and allowing the Agnus Dei to be sung. All of these actions were prohibited by his Bishop Dr. Philpott. These illegal practices resulted in Fr. Enraght having to face the full force of the Law from its defenders: the Church Association's lawyers and the presiding Judge, Lord Penzance.

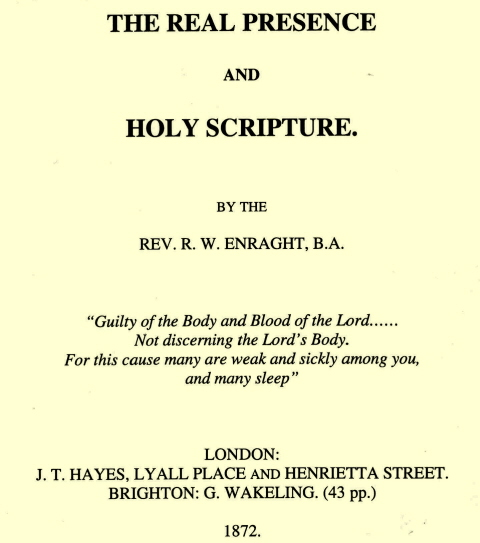
"The Real Presence & Holy Scripture" by Revd Richard Enraght. Teaching the subject matter of this pamphlet was illegal under the Public Worship Regulation Act.

Fr. Enraght argued:

If the English Church be true portion of the one Catholic Church of Christ is it not only reasonable that her Church buildings and services should resemble those of other branches of the Church Catholic."

Enraght refused to attend his own trial on 12 July 1879 on the grounds:

as I could not recognize Lord Penzance or his court, which derives its authority – not from "this Church and Realm", but solely from an Act of Parliament, as having any spiritual jurisdiction over me, I was unable conscientiously to defend myself before it.

He was convicted in his absence on 9 August 1879 on 16 counts of breaking the Law under the PWR Act. Judge Lord Penzance was presiding at the Arches Court.

Fr. Enraght's prosecution was known nationally as the "Bordesley Wafer Case", for one of the elements. Here is how evidence was collected:

On August 31, 1879, Mr. Enraght denounced from the altar the conduct of a person who, on February 9, had carried off from the altar a Consecrated Wafer, obtained under the pretence of communicating, in order to file It as an exhibit in the law courts as evidence of the use of wafer-bread. A feeling of intense horror and indignation was excited when the fact of this fearful sacrilege became known. It was difficult to credit the fact that a Consecrated Wafer, after having been sacrilegiously secreted by a pretended communicant, had actually been delivered to Mr. Churchwarden Perkins, the prosecutor, produced in Court as evidence, marked with pen and ink and filed as an exhibit! Thanks to some members of the Council of English Church Union, the Consecrated Wafer was obtained from the court and given over to the care of the Archbishop of Canterbury, who reverently consumed It in his private chapel at Addington on Friday December 12, 1879.

At the next vestry election, indignant parishioners rejected Perkins when nominated as churchwarden.

=== Imprisonment ===
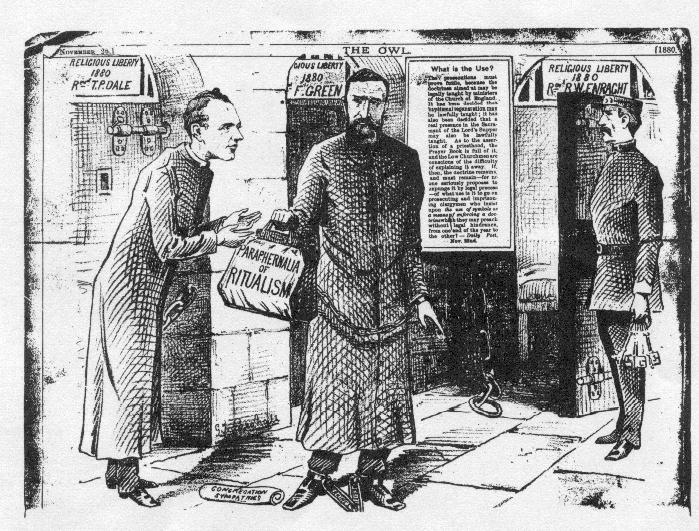
Illustration of Fr. Richard Enraght entering Warwick Prison in 1880

On 27 November 1880, Enraght was arrested at his vicarage and taken to Warwick Prison to serve his sentence.

On arrival at Warwick Prison after the train journey:

As we drew near the prison gate, the vicar let down his cassock so that he might enter as a Priest. At the gate he shook hands with us all, Dr. Nicholson saying, "Let us give him the blessing before he enters", and there, upon the damp stones, the prisoner knelt, and the white-haired doctor, with uplifted hand, pronounced the most solemn benediction I think I ever heard. So ended the arrest of one of the best men who ever suffered for his Master, and the impression it has left upon our minds seems to be "disestablishment", for it is too great a price to pay for the advantages of being united to the State.

G. Wakelin's recollected events of Fr. Enraght's arrest and imprisonment:

"To describe his leaving the vicarage where his people had ever found in himself and Mrs. Enraght helpers in all times of need and trouble, is beyond my power; most pathetic and touching was the going to Warwick Prison. His friends and even those who had to carry out the sentence, were far more touched and overcome than was the vicar himself, who went through it with a calm fixed patience, with thorough cheerfulness and resignation. The Governor of Warwick Prison, who was no High Churchman, said of Enraght to one of his visitors: "The sooner that gentleman is out, sir, the better, for he is altogether in the wrong place." For nearly two months he was kept in Warwick Prison, and during that time a great meeting was held, when Birmingham Town Hall was filled from end to end, and so many came from far and near to protest against the imprisonment; the singing of the "Church's one Foundation" at the end was something impressive and touching".

The persecution of English priests over these issues captured international attention, especially in the United States where the Oxford Movement had attracted many followers. On 19 December 1880 Revd Dr. Ewer, S.T.D., preached a sermon in St. Ignatius Church, New York, on "The Imprisonment of English Priests for Conscience Sake". He described Enraght's stand "as simply a determined resistance to a violation of the 'Magna Charta'." Ewer was "proud to make common cause with them, so far as is possible, from this distance, and feeling that when one member of the Catholic Church suffers, all the members suffer with him." Ewer's sermon was printed in full in the New York Herald and New York Tribune the following day. Four other priests in England also served prison sentences under the PWR Act: Arthur Tooth, T. Pelham Dale, Sidney Faithorn Green and James Bell Cox. The Conference of the Confraternity of the Blessed Sacrament in the USA sent a letter of support, "to express the sympathy of the Conference for Fr. R.W.Enraght in his incarceration for conscience's sake."

In England, the Revd Prof. Edward Bouverie Pusey wrote a letter to the editor of The Times in which he defended both Fr. Enraght and Fr. Alexander Heriot Mackonochie. He said, "They have not been struggling for themselves but for their people. The Ritualists do not ask to interfere with devotion of others …. only to be allowed, in their worship of God, to use a Ritual which a few years ago no one disputed." As Enraght was imprisoned over the Christmas period, he was gratified to receive letters of support and goodwill from his own and former parishioners around the country, as well as Christmas cards from children in Bordesley.

=== Released from Warwick Prison ===
The English Church Union took steps to quash the proceedings against Fr. Enraght, but it became clear the judges intended to support Lord Penzance. The Court of Appeal released Enraght after 49 days in prison on the grounds of a technical informality in the writ for committal. The Prosecutor tried to have Enraght re-committed, but the English Church Union forestalled his attempt by their own legal actions.

Through failure of an appeal to the House of Lords, in May 1882 Fr. Enraght became liable to another term of imprisonment. Three months later, under the provisions of the PWR Act, church authorities declared the benefice of Holy Trinity, Bordesley as vacant, although it was still canonically held by Enraght. In March 1883 Bishop Philpott revoked Enraght's licence and appointed another clergyman to the benefice, against the wishes of the congregation.

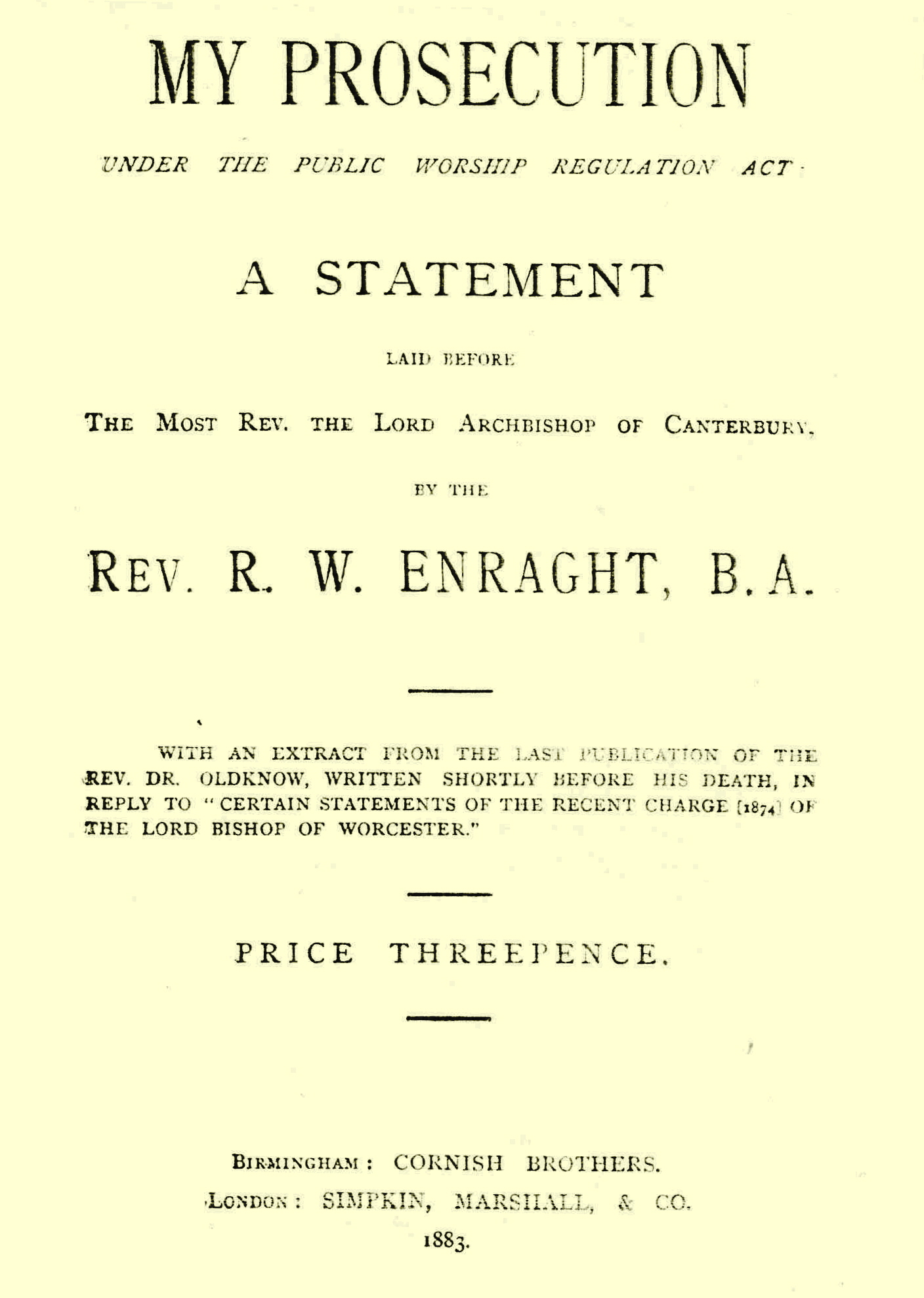
Title page of Revd Richard Enraght's 45-page statement objecting to treatment of him and his parishioners at Holy Trinity, Bordesley, from 1874 to 1883. He published it nationally and gave a copy to the Archbishop of Canterbury.

Following Fr. Enraght's dismissal and his family's eviction from Holy Trinity vicarage by order of Bishop Philpott, a crowded meeting of the congregation was held in the Highgate Board School, on 28 March, to say good-bye. Parishioners had taken up a collection which they gave to Fr. and Mrs. Enraght in appreciation.

When Bishop Philpott preached at Holy Trinity two months later on 6 May 1883, the churchwardens handed him a formal protest condemning the removal of Enraght and stating that "We, the truly aggrieved, have been left as sheep without a shepherd." They implied that the actions of Rev. Watt (Enraght's replacement) to tone down ritual had led to a significant reduction in the size of congregation.

The Royal Commission of 1881 studied the issues and made a report in 1883 that marked a historic turning point for the Church of England. It led to abandonment of the effort to repress ritualism. The ritualists' acts of civil disobedience and resulting jail terms had both embarrassed Low church Evangelicals and cemented an alliance with moderate High Church priests. The unity of the Church was threatened if officials continued efforts against ritualism. Archbishop Tait subordinated his concerns for national opinion and devoted himself to mending his ecclesiastical bridges.

== Later life and legacy ==
Revd Richard Enraght's gravestone at St Swithun's Church, Bintree in Norfolk

After Fr. Enraght's eviction from Holy Trinity, Bordesley, he worked for the next nine years of his ministry in east London. He served at the Church of St Michael and All Angels, Bromley-by-Bow from 1884 to 1888 and St Gabriel Church Poplar from 1888 to 1895.

In 1895 he arrived at his final Parish of St Swithun's Church, Bintree, after being presented to the benefice by Lord Hastings. He ended his ministry and life in a quiet country parish in Norfolk. Those who knew him could bear witness to his kind and helpful life as priest and friend to all his people, and those who were witnesses of his arrest and imprisonment would never forget the solemnity and pathos of that event.

Enraght died on St Matthew's Day, 21 September 1898, and was buried at the southeast end of St Swithun's churchyard, Bintree. His grave is that of a "Confessor" (someone who suffered for the faith, while not dying for it). The two windows of the Lady chapel, depicting the Annunciation of Our Lady, are dedicated to Enraght. A statue of St Swithun above the porch is inscribed: "It is placed as a memorial to a great and good priest Richard William Enraght."

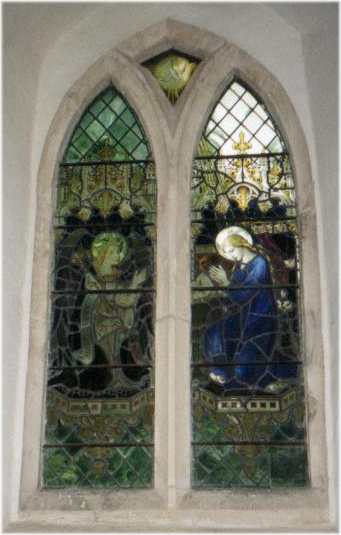
The two windows of the Lady Chapel, Bintree, depicting the Annunciation of Our Lady, are dedicated to Fr. Richard Enraght

Throughout Fr. Enraght's ministry, his wife Dorothea played an active part in church life wherever he served. She stood by him through the times of prosecution, imprisonment and the family's eviction from their Bordesley vicarage. In this period of hardship, the Church Union's Sustentation Fund supported Fr. Enraght and his family.

== Marriage and family ==
During Fr. Enraght and Dorothea's married life they had seven children:

- Mary (born and died 1866, Lincolnshire),
- William (b. 1868, Brighton),
- Ellen (b. 1870, Brighton),
- Hawtrey (b. 1871, Brighton),
- Grace (b. 1873, Portslade),
- Dora (b. 1875, Birmingham) and Alice (b. 1879, Birmingham).

In 1896 Fr. Enraght saw his son Hawtrey ordained a priest in Norfolk. Shortly after Richard Enraght's death, his widow Dorothea and daughter Grace moved to Walsingham, where Grace married the Revd Edgar Reeves, the Vicar of Walsingham.

Fr. Hawtrey Enraght served as Vicar of St Helen's, Ranworth. The altar in the north parclose was dedicated to his father. In later life his ministry took him to St Margaret's Church, Lowestoft. For his long and dedicated service to his Diocese of Norwich, the Revd Hawtrey Enraght was awarded the honorary title of Canon in 1928.

In 1933, the Catholic Literature Association issued the following tribute to Fr. Richard Enraght and the four other priests who had been imprisoned:

The names of those who suffered the indignity of imprisonment were Arthur Tooth, Vicar of St. James', Hatcham; R. W. Enraght, Rector of Holy Trinity, Bordesley; T. Pelham Dale, Rector of St. Vedast, Foster Lane, in the City of London; Sidney Faithorn Green, Rector of St John's, Miles Platting; and James Bell Cox, Vicar of St. Margaret's, Liverpool. . . . To these brave priests and many others who suffered we owe a great tribute of thankfulness and praise, for it was through their determination to stand by the Church in her hour of peril that we have won the tolerance and liberty we have today. The Act of Parliament under which these priests suffered is still on the Statute Book, but for all practical purposes it is dead.

In 1933 Marcus Donovan wrote:

These 'Five Confessors', in obeying the laws of the Church, suffered deprivation and imprisonment under the P.W.R. Act, and by their witness and steadfastness may be said to have brought to an end the policy of legal persecution.

A modern-day commentary on the events that surrounded the Public Worship Regulation Act 1874 comes from the Oxford Dictionary of the Christian Church: "This attempt at suppressing Ritualism so discredited the Act (in fact it created Anglo-Catholic martyrs) that it led to its being regarded as virtually obsolete." Despite not being used, the Public Worship Regulation Act 1874 was kept on the statute books for 89 years until repeal in the Ecclesiastical Jurisdiction Measure of 1963.

In February 2006, the Brighton newspaper The Argus, reported that Brighton & Hove City Council had accepted the name of Fr. Richard Enraght, whom they described as a "Priest, fighter for religious freedom", as a candidate for a blue plaque to be erected in his memory on his former home in Station Road, Portslade. In September 2006, bus operator Brighton & Hove honoured Enraght by naming one of their new fleet buses, No.905 after him.

== Published works ==
- To The Poor The Gospel is Preached. London: Bell and Daldy. 1865 – via Project Canterbury. – a sermon (with a preface) advocating the right of the people to freedom of public worship in "The Church of the People", – written while a curate at St Luke Church, Sheffield.
- Bible-Ritualism Indispensably Necessary for Purposes of Instruction & of Worship. London: Masters. 1866 – via Project Canterbury. – a sermon, – written while a curate at St Luke Church Sheffield.
- Who Are True Churchmen, and Who Are Conspirators?. London: J. T. Hayes. 1870 – via Project Canterbury. – an appeal to the Last Settlement of the English Reformation in 1662 – written while a curate at St Paul's Church, Brighton.
- "Free and Open Churches and the Weekly Offertory" (1871) – a lecture for the National Association for Promoting Freedom of Worship – written while a curate at St Paul's Church, Brighton.
- The Real Presence and Holy Scripture. London: J. T. Hayes. 1872 – via Project Canterbury. – written while Priest in Charge of St Andrew Church Portslade.
- Catholic Worship not Pharisaic-Judaism. London: J. T. Hayes. 1873 – via Project Canterbury. – written while Priest in Charge of St Andrew Church Portslade.
- Not Law, But Unconstitutional Tyranny. London: T. Hayes. 1877 – via Project Canterbury. – a lecture on the "Present Unconstitutional Exercise of the Royal Supremacy in Matters Spiritual", – Holy Trinity Bordesley.
- "A Pastoral to the Faithful Worshipping at Holy Trinity, Bordesley" – Birmingham, (20 July 1879).
- The Ridsdale judgement on vestments: Was it an intentional miscarriage of justice? : Holy Trinity Schools, Bordesley, (17 November 1880).
- "My Ordination Oaths and other Declarations: am I Keeping Them?" (1880) – Holy Trinity, Bordesley.
- "An Aggrieved Parish, or The Minutes of the Easter vestries in the Parish of Holy Trinity, Birmingham", from 1878 to 1881, with an address delivered in 1881.
- My Prosecution under the Public Worship Regulation Act. London: Marshall, & Co. 1883 – via Project Canterbury. – a statement laid before the most Rev. the Lord Archbishop of Canterbury, – Holy Trinity, Bordesley.
