= Guild of All Souls =

2019 Requiem Mass in the Church of the Advent, Boston

The Guild of All Souls is an Anglican devotional society dedicated to prayer for faithful departed Christians. As stated on its website, it is a "devotional society praying for the souls of the Faithful Departed, and teaching the Catholic doctrine of the Communion of Saints."

The Charity Commission for England and Wales recorded the Guild's registration as charity number 240234 on 12 July 1965. It reported total funds of £901,949, total gross income of £31.69k and total expenditure of £44.33k. It received no income from government contracts or grants.

== Objectives ==
The stated objectives of the guild are as follows:

- The celebration of Requiem Masses.
- Promotion of the Communion of Saints and the Resurrection of the Dead.
- Promotion of The Sacrament of Healing.
- Reservation of the Blessed Sacrament for the sick and the dying.

== History ==
The Guild of All Souls was founded in March 1873 at St. James's Church, Hatcham. It was originally called the Guild Burial Society, with Father Arthur Tooth as the first president. The purpose of the Guild Burial Society was:

to provide furniture for Burial according to the use of the Catholic Church to set forth the two great doctrines of the Communion of Saints and the Resurrection of the Body; and Intercessory prayer for the Dying and the repose of the souls of the deceased members and all the faithful departed.

The work of the guild soon attracted the attention of other churches in England, and from a small parochial group, it increased rapidly in membership throughout England.

American branch Superior-General Barry E. B. Swain preaching in 2019

In Chicago, in 1885, an English delegation had a meeting with priests and lay persons of the Episcopal Church to build an American Branch. This was accomplished in 1889. In 1904 the Australian branch was founded in Melbourne. The National Shrine of the Sacred Heart at the Church of the Resurrection in New York City is the headquarters of the American branch of the guild.

== Anglican devotional societies ==
Since the time of the Oxford Movement (also known as the "Catholic Revival") in the Church of England (and its sister churches), there have been organisations to propagate the Catholic faith and practice within the Anglican tradition. The Guild of All Souls is among the most prominent of these societies, which include the Society of King Charles the Martyr, the Society of Mary, and the Confraternity of the Blessed Sacrament.

Each of these societies promotes one aspect of Catholic faith and practice that is not emphasised by the Anglican churches as a whole. For the Guild of All Souls, this is the promotion of the Catholic understanding of death and resurrection and prayer for Christians who have died.

== Chantry chapel ==
The Guild maintains the Chantry Chapel of Saint Michael and the Holy Souls at the Anglican Shrine of Our Lady of Walsingham in Walsingham.

== See also ==
- Catholic Societies of the Church of England
- Anglican Communion
- Anglo-Catholicism
- Confraternity of the Blessed Sacrament
- Guild of Servants of the Sanctuary
- Society of the Holy Cross
- Society of King Charles the Martyr
- Society of Mary (Anglican)
