= Paul Williamson =

Anglo-Catholic priest in the Church of England

The Reverend Paul Williamson
- Church: Church of England
- Diocese: Diocese of London
- In office: 1992 to 2019

Orders
- Ordination: 1972 (deacon); 1973 (priest)

Personal details
- Born: Paul Stewart Williamson; 1948 (age 77–78)
- Education: King's College London

Paul Stewart Williamson (born November 1948) is a priest of the Anglican Church of England. He has brought a number of high-profile and controversial civil suits in English courts over matters of Anglican faith and practice, including the ordination of women to the priesthood, the legality of the marriage of Charles, Prince of Wales to Camilla, Duchess of Cornwall and has challenged the retirement age of 70 within the Church of England.

== Early life and education ==
Williamson was born in 1948. He studied theology at King's College London, and graduated in 1971 with a Bachelor of Divinity (BD) degree and the Associateship of King's College (AKC).

== Ordained ministry ==
Williamson was ordained in the Church of England as a deacon in 1972 and as a priest in 1973. From 1972 to 1975, he served his curacy at St Paul's, Deptford in the Diocese of Southwark. He was an honorary curate of St John the Divine, Kennington between 1976 and 1977.

In 1978, Williamson moved to the Diocese of London. He served as a curate at Holy Trinity with St Mary, Hoxton from 1978 to 1983, at All Saints, Margaret Street from 1983 to 1984, and at St Mary's, Willesden from 1984 to 1985. For the next three years, he was not attached to any parish but held permission to officiate in the diocese. In 1989 he joined St George's Church, Hanworth, as a curate, subsequently serving the parish as priest-in-charge from 1992 until his retirement in 2019.

Williamson is an Anglo-Catholic. He is a member of the Society of Mary.

== Activism ==
Williamson is a well-known opponent of the ordination of women to the priesthood. In 1997 he sued the dean and chapter of St Paul's Cathedral for appointing a woman as a minor canon. On 16 July 1997, he was declared to be a vexatious litigant by Mr Justice Christopher Rose at the Royal Courts of Justice. As a result, he is no longer allowed to bring action within the Courts of England and Wales without obtaining the prior permission of a judge.

In 2005, Williamson protested against the legality of the marriage of Charles, Prince of Wales to Camilla, Duchess of Cornwall.

In 2011, with others, Williamson challenged a major grant by the Confraternity of the Blessed Sacrament to the Personal Ordinariate of Our Lady of Walsingham. The Charity Commission for England and Wales, which described the complainants as "a substantial number", subsequently ruled that the grant had been unlawful.

On 26 January 2015, during the consecration service at York Minster for Libby Lane, who was to become the Church of England's first female bishop, Williamson was the lone dissenting voice when the gathered clergy were asked whether she should be ordained. His dissent was answered by the officiant, Archbishop of York John Sentamu, and the service continued.

Williamson's initial application to challenge the Church of England's compulsory retirement age of 70 was dismissed by the Employment Tribunal on 8 January 2020 because he had not obtained the prior permission of the High Court under the terms of the vexatious litigant order.

On January 28, 2026, during the confirmation of election of Sarah Mullally as Archbishop of Canterbury at Saint Paul's Cathedral, Williamson interrupted the ceremony when the Proctor informed the Archbishop of York that no lawful objections had been received prior to the confirmation, and was escorted from the cathedral by vergers. A witness said he had opposed Sarah’s election over the handling of safeguarding cases in the Diocese of London.
