= Society of the Holy Cross =

Anglo-Catholic society of male priests

Symbol of the Society of the Holy Cross

The Society of the Holy Cross (SSC; Latin: Societas Sanctae Crucis) is an international Anglo-Catholic society of male priests with members in the Anglican Communion and the Continuing Anglican movement, who live under a common rule of life that informs their priestly ministry and charism.

== Founding and early history ==
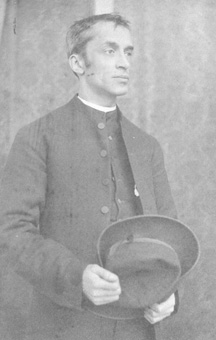
Arthur Tooth

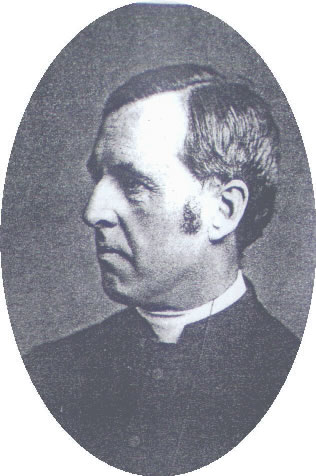
Alexander Heriot Mackonochie

The society was founded on 28 February 1855 (171 years ago) at the chapel of the House of Charity, Soho, London, by six priests: Charles Fuge Lowder, Charles Maurice Davies, David Nicols, Alfred Poole, Joseph Newton Smith and Henry Augustus Rawes. The society they formed was initially intended as a spiritual association for their personal edification, but it soon came to be among the driving forces behind the Anglo-Catholic movement, particularly after the first phase of the Oxford Movement had played its course and John Henry Newman had been received into the Roman Catholic Church.

Lowder was the founder of the society and served as its first master. While visiting France in 1854, he conceived of the idea of an order of Anglican priests based on the Lazarists, a Roman Catholic order founded by St Vincent de Paul. The society provided its members with a rule of life and a vision of a disciplined priestly life. Mutual support has always been a key element and the life of the society is experienced primarily through the local chapter. Attendance at chapter is of obligation unless prevented by genuine pastoral duties.

The society expanded almost immediately. These early priests of the society ministered in some of the poorest slum areas of London and other cities. These included the parishes of St Barnabas' Pimlico and St Peter's, London Docks. Many of these areas were so dangerous that bishops refused to visit them, although their refusal was also motivated by a distaste for the ritualism of the Anglo-Catholic clergy.

Anglo-Catholic ritualism is very close to practices in the Roman Catholic Church and included devotion to the Blessed Sacrament, frequent celebration of the Mass with intentions, the practice of confession, the wearing of eucharistic vestments, the use of incense, liturgical hand bells and wafer bread. Whilst these practices had not been completely unknown in the Church of England since its break with the Roman Catholic Church, most of them had not been in general use for hundreds of years as the Church of England had become increasingly influenced by Protestantism in its liturgical practice during and after the reigns of Edward VI and Elizabeth I. SSC priests considered these practices an outward, necessary, and physical expression of belief and doctrine and not merely as aesthetic adornments to worship. The society was primarily concerned with improving the spiritual life of priests and people. For example, the now common practice of retreats was introduced to the Church of England in those given by SSC priests, beginning in 1856.

Many low church and Latitudinarian Anglicans viewed ritualism and the accompanying teaching with horror. It was not unusual for Mass and the Divine Office in SSC parishes to be disrupted by Protestant protesters, some hired for the occasion, shouting during the readings and sermon or hurling furniture and books. Lawsuits were filed against priests for Catholic practices. Some of these prosecutions were successful and priests were suspended from their ministries. In other actions, some Catholic practices were permitted by the courts while others were ruled illegal. Still other practices were sometimes ruled by the civil courts not to be illegal per se but that their continued use would require direct authorisation by the diocesan bishop.

== Public Worship Regulation Act ==
The legal inconsistencies led to the passing of the Public Worship Regulation Act by the Disraeli government in 1874 with the stated aim of "putting down the Ritualists". The act was introduced in the House of Lords as a Private Member's Bill by Archibald Tait, the Archbishop of Canterbury, who had previously served as the Bishop of London. After the act came into force, on 1 July 1875, the Church Association, which had been responsible for some the pre-act lawsuits, began vigorously prosecuting those who persisted in Anglo-Catholic practice and teaching. Seventeen priests were prosecuted under the act. In some cases these priests served time in prison for either not acknowledging the right of the courts to judge them on matters of worship or after being convicted. Occasionally some bishops (including Archbishop Tait) would intervene to stop prosecutions, particularly as public outrage grew at the blatant interference in religious matters by secular courts.

The prosecution of SSC priests Arthur Tooth, Alexander Heriot Mackonochie and Richard William Enraght are among the most notable episodes in the early history of the society.

== In the 20th century ==
The prosecutions, however, were battles won in a losing war. In 1906, a royal commission effectively nullified the act by admitting that more pluralism in public worship was needed. The selfless example of SSC priests in ministering to the lowest orders of society and their strong stands on social justice had also endeared them to the general public, not least the example of Father Lowder, founder of the society, staying in Wapping to provide care to his people during the cholera outbreak of 1866.

Alexander Penrose Forbes, Bishop of Brechin in the Scottish Episcopal Church from 1847 till his death in 1874, was probably the first of many SSC bishops around the world, including the saintly Frank Weston, Bishop of Zanzibar.

As a Catholic society, SSC has taken a conservative line in the church controversies of the late 20th century, particularly over the interpretation of scripture and the ordination of women.

== 21st century ==
As of October 2017 there are over 1,000 members of the society organised into provinces for England and Scotland, the Americas, Wales, and Australasia, each under a provincial master reporting to an international master general. There are also some members in the Lutheran Church of Sweden. The current master general of the society is Nicolas Spicer. He resides in Worksop, England. The brethren keep a common rule of life, which bears much in common with the original rule from the founders of the society.

In April 2005, the society celebrated its 150th anniversary with a week-long festival, "Stand Up For Jesus". The Archbishop of Canterbury, Rowan Williams, addressed the gathering and the Royal Albert Hall was filled to capacity for the closing Mass.

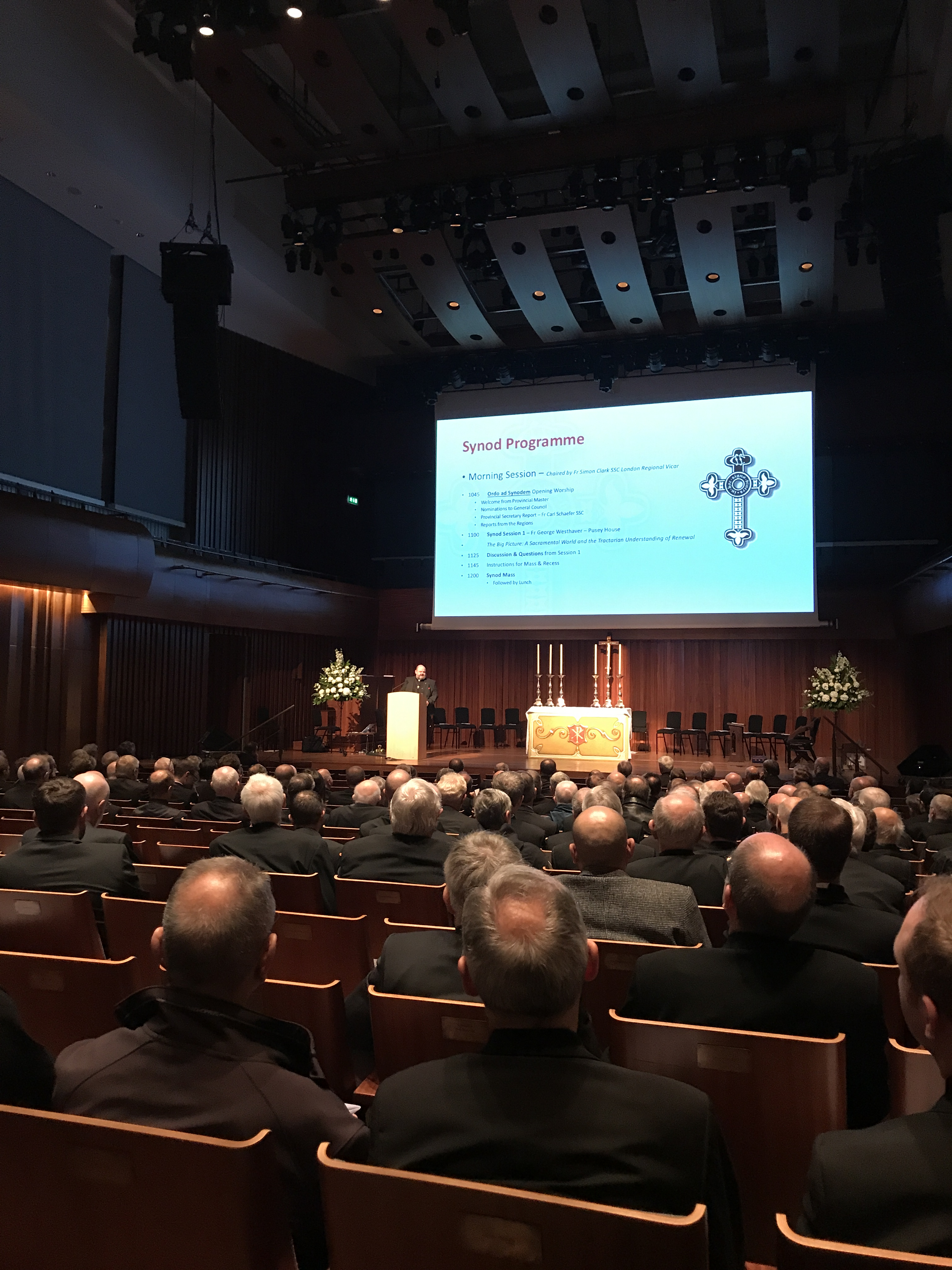
The 2017 provincial synod

The brethren of the society meet in regular chapter meetings and in annual regional, or national synods. Priests of the society can be recognised by the small gold lapel cross that they sometimes wear. On it is inscribed the motto of the society, In Hoc Signo Vinces ("In this sign conquer").

There is also a section of the society, the Pusey Guild, for ordinands and approved candidates for training for the priesthood.

== Bishops ==
A number of sitting bishops are associated with the society, although the roll of the society is a private document, never published.

- Paul Thomas, Bishop suffragan of Oswestry (Church of England)
- Stephen Race, Bishop suffragan of Beverley (Church of England)
- William Hazlewood, Bishop suffragan of Lewes (Church of England)
- Luke Irvine-Capel, Bishop suffragan of Richborough (Church of England)
- Ryan Reed, Diocesan Bishop of Fort Worth (Anglican Church in North America)
- Paul Hewett, Bishop of the Diocese of the Holy Cross (Anglican Catholic Church)
- William Bower, Bishop of the Diocese of the Eastern United States (Anglican Church in America)
- Chandler Jones, Archbishop of the Anglican Province of America

== See also ==
- Anglican religious order
- Catholic Societies of the Church of England
- Community of the Holy Cross
- Confraternity of the Blessed Sacrament
- Congregation of the Companions of the Holy Saviour
- Guild of All Souls
- Guild of Servants of the Sanctuary
- Society of Catholic Priests
- Society of King Charles the Martyr
- Society of Mary (Anglican)
- T. Pelham Dale
- The Society (Church of England)
- Society of the Holy Trinity
