= Guild of Servants of the Sanctuary =

- Founded: 3 December 1898
- Type: Devotional Society
- Purpose: Altar servers
- Location: c/o GSS Mail, PO Box 9728, Ferndale, CF43 9AT, United Kingdom
- Region served: Church of England & Church in Wales
- Key people: Michael Andrew (Secretary-General), The Revd Darren Smith (Warden)
- Website: guildofservantsofthesanctuary.co.uk

The Guild of Servants of the Sanctuary or GSS is an association of altar servers in the Church of England and the Church in Wales, with some overseas organisation in several other countries. It is one of the Catholic Societies of the Church of England.

== Objectives and Membership ==
The Guild states its objectives as follows:

1. To raise the spiritual tone of altar servers;
2. To promote a conscientious performance of the duties of altar servers; and
3. To encourage more frequent attendance at the Holy Eucharist, in addition to times of duty.

Membership is open to any man or woman who is an altar server in the Church of England and 'accepts Catholic Faith and Practice'. (In the context of the Guild, Catholic is understood to mean 'of the universal church' and not 'Roman Catholic'.)

== Organisation ==
The Guild is organised into local chapters, each overseen by a secretary, who is a member of the Guild, and a chaplain, who is a priest and thus a 'priest associate' of the Guild. Chapters meet regularly: a typical gathering takes the form of a specially-tailored version of Evensong called the 'Guild Office': this consists largely of Psalms and Canticles sung antiphonally, culminating in the Magnificat (Song of Mary) and a brief reading from the Holy Bible. The Guild Office will often be followed by a short address and perhaps Benediction. When undertaking Guild activities, members dress in choir dress: typically a black cassock with a white surplice, but sometimes a white or coloured cassock-alb according to local usage. Members also wear a special 'Guild Medal' engraved with the text (in Latin) 'I will go unto the altar of God', Introibo ad Altare Dei, which is the opening line of a well-known prayer said by those preparing to assist at the Holy Eucharist.

== Ordination of women ==
As with many of the Catholic Societies of the Church of England, the Guild is officially opposed to the ordination of women. On 18 March 2006 the Guild's General Council affirmed an earlier Warden's Statement not to recognise as valid the orders of women ordained to the priesthood and stated that any meeting using the sacramental offices of a woman priest could not be considered to be a meeting of the Guild; however, the Council stopped short of expelling individual members of the Guild who availed themselves of the offices of women priests outside the immediate context of the Guild, instead asking that they 'should respect the stance of the Guild on such matters.'

== See also ==
- Catholic Societies of the Church of England
- Confraternity of the Blessed Sacrament
- Guild of All Souls
- Society of the Holy Cross
- Society of King Charles the Martyr
- Society of Mary
- Company of Servers
