= C. P. A. Burnett =

Charles Philip Augustus Burnett (June 5, 1849 — November 14, 1933) was a major American Anglo-Catholic priest, liturgist, and author in the Episcopal Church. Born in Skaneateles, New York, he was graduated from the General Theological Seminary in 1878, and ordained to the priesthood "with full literary qualifications" (i.e. no undergraduate degree) in 1879 by Bishop Horatio Potter of the Episcopal Diocese of New York. Burnett was associated closely with William McGarvey of Philadelphia, but remained within the Protestant Episcopal Church after McGarvey and many of his followers became Roman Catholics in the Open Pulpit Controversy of 1907-1909.

He served as priest assistant at the Church of St. Ignatius of Antioch from 1900 to 1914 under Arthur Ritchie, and at the Church of the Holy Rood in New York City. His primary parochial ministry aside from St. Ignatius was as assistant vicar and vicar from 1921 onward at the former Holy Cross Mission Chapel, also in New York; he had celebrated his first Mass in the same church in 1879.

Burnett was secretary-general of the American Branch of the Confraternity of the Blessed Sacrament from 1914 to 1922.

Burnett is buried at the Trinity Church Cemetery and Mausoleum in New York City.

== Bibliography ==
- (with William McGarvey) The Ceremonies of the Mass, Arranged Conformably to the Rubrics of the Book of Common Prayer (1907)
- A Ritual and Ceremonial Commentary on the Occasional Offices of Holy Baptism, Matrimony, Penance, Communion of the Sick, and Extreme Unction (1907)
- The Confirmation Rubric (1915)
- "The Scope or Field of Episcopal Jurisdiction," American Church Review, July 1917.
- Low Mass Ceremonial, in Accordance with the English Rite as Set Forth in the Book of Common Prayer (1921)
