= Society of Mary (Anglican) =

Anglican devotional society to the Virgin Mary

- Abbreviation: SOM
- Named after: Mary Help of Christians
- Formation: 1931
- Merger of: The Confraternity of Our Lady (formed in 1880) and the League of Our Lady (formed in 1902).
- Type: Marian devotional society
- Headquarters: United Kingdom
- Region served: Worldwide
- Services: Grants for pilgrimages (Marian shrines) and reparations of Marian images (UK).
- Official language: English
- Superior General: Fr Graeme Rowlands ssc
- Chaplain-General: Fr Simon Morris ssc
- Affiliations: Church of England, Anglican Communion
- Staff: 4-6

The Society of Mary is an Anglican devotional society dedicated to the Blessed Virgin Mary.

"dedicated to the Glory of God and the Holy Incarnation of Christ under the invocation of Our Lady, Help of Christians."

The Anglican Society of Mary is not to be confused with the two Roman Catholic religious orders of the same name commonly called the Marists and the Marianists.

== Objectives ==
The stated objectives of the society are:

- To love and honour Mary
- To spread devotion to her in reparation for past neglect and misunderstanding
- To take Mary as a model in purity, personal relationships and family life

Members of the society keep a rule of life that includes traditional Marian devotions (such as the Angelus and the Rosary), intercession for the faithful departed members of the society, participation in Mass on the major Marian feasts and solemnities and active engagement in apostolic work.

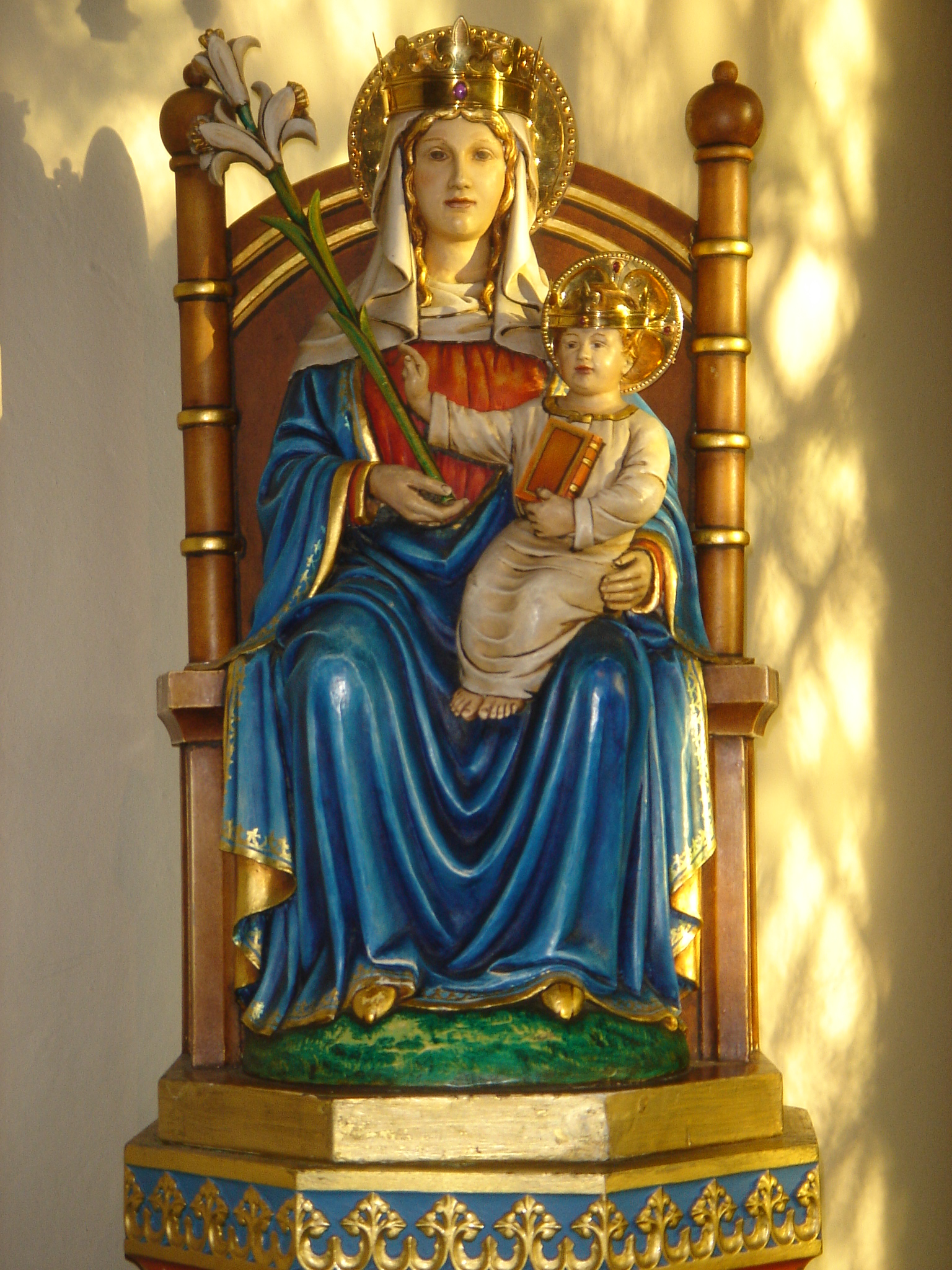
Our Lady of Walsingham.

In localities where there are a number of members they may come together to form local organisations called "wards" or "cells". These groups gather for prayer and fellowship.

The society's magazine, called AVE, is published twice per year.

== History ==
The Society of Mary began in 1931 as the combination of two other societies: The Confraternity of Our Lady (formed in 1880) and the League of Our Lady (formed in 1902). The American region of the society received its independence in 1962. Although Anglican in origin there are non-Anglican members of the society and they can be found all over the world. The main regional organisations are in England and the United States.

== Major festivals of the society ==
- February 2: Purification of St Mary the Virgin
- March 25: Annunciation to the Blessed Virgin Mary
- May 31: Visitation of the Blessed Virgin Mary
- August 15: Saint Mary the Virgin (The Assumption)
- September 8: Nativity of the Blessed Virgin Mary
- October 15: Our Lady of Walsingham
- November 21: Presentation of Mary
- December 8: Conception of the Blessed Virgin Mary

== Anglican devotional societies ==
- Society of King Charles the Martyr
- Guild of All Souls
- Guild of Servants of the Sanctuary
- Confraternity of the Blessed Sacrament
- Society of the Companions of the Holy Cross

== See also ==
- Catholic Societies of the Church of England
- Anglican Marian theology
- Anglo-Catholicism
- Blessed Virgin Mary
- Marian antiphons
- Mother of God
- Our Lady of Walsingham
- Our Lady of Ipswich
