= Confraternity of the Blessed Sacrament =

Devotional society in the Anglican Communion

The badge of the Confraternity of the Blessed Sacrament

The Confraternity of the Blessed Sacrament (CBS), officially the Confraternity of the Blessed Sacrament of the Body and Blood of Christ, is a devotional society in the Anglican Communion dedicated to venerating the Real Presence of Christ in the Eucharist. It has worked to promote the Mass as the main Sunday service in churches, regular confession, and the Eucharistic fast. The society's motto is Adoremus in aeternum sanctissimum sacramentum, or in English, "Let us forever adore the Most Blessed Sacrament".

It is the oldest Anglican devotional society. In its present form it resulted from the amalgamation on 26 February 1867, of two older societies: the Society of the Blessed Sacrament, founded in 1860, and the Confraternity of the Blessed Sacrament, founded in 1862 by Thomas Thellusson Carter after the Oxford Movement in the Church of England. Members are known as associates.

The Charity Commission for England and Wales recorded the Confraternity's registration as charity number 1082897 on 17 October 2000. It reported total gross income of £101.25k and total expenditure of £82.71k. It received no income from government contracts or grants.

== Duties of associates ==
Associates and priests-associate (the constitution differentiates between the two, but the requirements are identical) of the Confraternity of the Blessed Sacrament strive to promote reverence for Jesus in the Holy Eucharist through the witness of their lives, words, prayers and teaching. They pray for one another at Mass and before the Blessed Sacrament and make use of the Sacrament of Reconciliation. Use of the Eucharistic fast has varied at times in the history of the Confraternity.

== Structure ==
=== Autonomous provinces ===
The confraternity consists of autonomous provinces, of which there are currently two - the English (and original) CBS and the American CBS - each led by a superior-general and administered by a secretary-general and treasurer-general. Additionally there are semi-autonomous branches of CBS in both Canada and Australia, though currently neither has the numerical strength to become a fully autonomous province, and so they remain part of the English CBS. The English CBS is also active in Sweden, Wales and the Channel Islands. Currently lacking structure, there are fledgling CBS movements in parts of Africa.

=== Districts ===
Within an autonomous province of CBS there may be a further level of structure known as a "district". The English CBS is divided into 23 districts. A district is led by a "district superior", who may appoint a "district secretary", and is a collection of all the wards within a particular region.

=== Wards ===
The local unit of CBS is known as a "ward". Members of the confraternity meet together in local wards for prayer, worship and mutual support under the guidance of a priest as "ward superior", assisted by a "ward secretary". Each ward decides its own annual programme of events and the ward superior has authority to admit new associates (although he must consult the district superior or superior-general before admitting a new priest-associate).

Many wards are attached to a local parish, although this is not necessary according to the constitution, which merely requires a priest-associate (as ward superior) to gather other associates around himself in order to form a ward. In recent times a number of priests-associate have formed wards which are not attached to any parish church. Examples in the English CBS include:

- The Ward of the Sacred Heart, attached to the Diocese of Lincoln and holding a meeting once a year;
- The Ward of St Cuthman - attached to the Deanery of Storrington and holding meetings throughout that deanery;
- The Ward of the Precious Blood - attached to the Deanery of Horsham and holding meetings throughout that deanery;
- The Ward of St Mary and St Nicolas - attached to Lancing College and for the benefit of members of that school who belong to CBS;
- The Ward of St Brigid - a geographically vast ward, uniting scattered CBS members throughout Sweden.

There remain unattached associates of CBS, who live too far from any ward to be able to participate in its life. These unattached associates receive updates and news directly from the secretary-general.

== Finances ==
The English CBS has benefited from a number of generous bequests and careful financial management and has consequently built up considerable financial reserves. These allow it to provide grants of vessels and vestments to priests celebrating the Eucharist and reserving the Blessed Sacrament in poorer parishes and also to provide financial support to large projects and conferences, including the annual Caister Conference.

In early July 2011, controversy broke when it was first rumoured, then reported in The Times, that the confraternity had made a grant of £1 million to the Personal Ordinariate of Our Lady of Walsingham, thus divesting itself of more than half its assets. Christopher Pearson, superior-general of the confraternity, was reported (by Ruth Gledhill) in The Times as stating that the trustees believed, having taken legal advice, that the grant was compatible with the charitable objects of the confraternity, a view which Pearson also stated in a letter to members of the confraternity. This was disputed by others, including Paul Williamson who described the grant as "a disgrace" and made formal complaints to both the Archbishop of Westminster and the Charity Commission. In June 2012, the Charity Commission for England and Wales stated that following a "substantial number of complaints" it had carried out an investigation and judged the grant to be improper in that a majority of the trustees of CBS who authorised the grant were themselves members of the ordinariate, meaning that "the majority of the Trustees [had] a (financial) personal interest in the decision". The commission ruled that the grant was both "invalid" and "unauthorised". The commission also appeared to rule out any similar grants in the future, when it stated: "there is substantial doubt whether the Confraternity could make a grant to the Ordinariate (even with restrictions) which could be applied by the Ordinariate consistently with the objects of the Confraternity". Shortly after the publication of the Charity Commission's findings the superior-general (Christopher Pearson), secretary-general, and treasurer-general of CBS, who were all members of the ordinariate, resigned. The full £1 million grant was repaid to the confraternity, with interest.

== Other points of interest ==
The English CBS publishes a quarterly newsletter and prayer schedule, known as the Quarterly Paper or QP, and sent to all associates. Other publications include The Constitution, The Manual, and The Directory (of districts and wards).

The American CBS publishes twice a year an Intercession Paper, which is sent to all associates.

There are copies of the society's manuals in the Library and Museum of Freemasonry in London, listed under Classmark 1295 CON.

Members of the Confraternity were instrumental in the founding (in 1869) of a religious order of Anglican nuns whose work was to make reparation (by prayer) for what the founders perceived to be dishonour to Jesus through the historic attitude of the Church of England to the Blessed Sacrament. The sisters were known as the Community of Reparation to Jesus in the Blessed Sacrament (CRJBS).

Bishop Roger Jupp is the current superior-general in the United Kingdom. The Superior-General of the American branch is Bishop Dan Martins. The late Reverend Canon Brian Freeland (1925-2022) lead the Canadian organisation.

== Liturgical materials ==
- Confraternity of the Blessed Sacrament Hymns (1928)
- Vespers of the Blessed Sacrament (1936)
- Manual of the Confraternity of the Blessed Sacrament of the Body and Blood of Christ (American Branch, 1954)

== Notable members ==
- John Bauerschmidt
- C. P. A. Burnett
- Thomas Thellusson Carter
- Loren N. Gavitt
- Charles Chapman Grafton
- Reginald Mallett, Superior-General of the American Branch, 1946-1965
- Dan Martins
- James W. Montgomery
- Robert Alfred John Suckling
- Grieg Taber
- Granville M. Williams SSJE

== See also ==
- Anglo-Catholicism
- Catholic societies of the Church of England
- Guild of All Souls
- Guild of Servants of the Sanctuary
- Society of King Charles the Martyr
- Society of Mary (Anglican)
- Society of the Holy Cross
