= Robert Alfred John Suckling =

British priest (1842–1917)

Robert Alfred John Suckling (1842–1917) was a priest of the Church of England and a notable Anglo-Catholic leader.

He was the son of Robert Suckling of Cambridge, and the grandson of Alfred Inigo Suckling, née Fox. He matriculated at St Edmund Hall, Oxford in 1861. He was ordained deacon in 1865 and priest in 1867. He served from 1880 at St Peter's, London Docks. He became superior of the Confraternity of the Blessed Sacrament following the death of Thomas Thellusson Carter in 1901. He also succeeded Edward Bouverie Pusey as warden of the Community of the Sisters of Charity.

From 1882 until his death he served at St Alban's Church, Holborn. He is commemorated by a brass located before its altar.
