= Arthur Tooth =

English Anglo-Catholic priest (1849–1931)

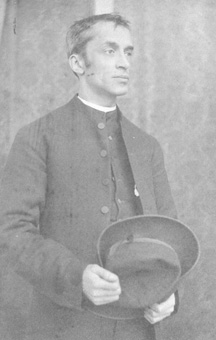

Arthur Tooth SSC (17 June 1839 – 5 March 1931) was a ritualist priest in the Church of England and a member of the Society of the Holy Cross. Tooth is best known for being prosecuted in 1876 under the Public Worship Regulation Act 1874 for using proscribed liturgical practices. He was also briefly imprisoned as a result of the prosecution in 1877.

== Early life and career ==
Tooth was born on 17 June 1839 at Swifts Park near Cranbrook, Kent. He was educated at Tonbridge School and, in 1858, became a student at Trinity College, Cambridge. He graduated in science in 1862.

After he graduated from Cambridge University, Tooth travelled around the world twice (he became an accomplished horseman and crack shot) and he discovered a vocation to the priesthood – although no satisfactory explanation seems to have been found for what sparked off his interest in ritualism. He was ordained deacon in 1863 to a title at St Mary-the-Less, Lambeth, but he spent only a year there because his churchmanship clashed with that of his vicar. He was ordained priest in 1864 and served a second curacy at St Mary's Folkestone. From 1865 to 1868 he was minister of St Mary Magdalene's mission church in the parish of St. Nicholas Church, Chiswick. In 1868 he became vicar of St James's Hatcham, a working class parish in south-east London.

Tooth's efforts to renew the life of St James's Hatcham started to attract large congregations. His approach combined capable preaching, the introduction of ritualist practices and the establishment of parish organisations designed to help the more needy residents of the area. He also established the Guild of All Souls at St James's in 1873.

== Prosecution ==
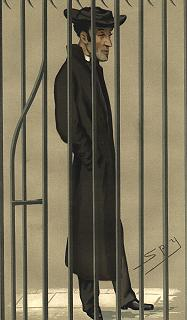
"The Christian Martyr" Tooth as caricatured by Spy (Leslie Ward) in Vanity Fair, February 1877

When the Public Worship Regulation Act was passed in 1874, those who disapproved of his ritualist liturgical practices set a prosecution in motion. He was charged with (among other things) the use of incense, vestments and altar candles. The case came before Lord Penzance at Lambeth Palace on 13 July 1876. Tooth did not attend as he refused to recognise the authority of the court. He ignored both the judicial warnings that resulted from his non-attendance and the legal attempts to restrain him from exercising his ministry, although he was now facing disruptions when he presided at worship caused largely by people hired for the purpose by his opponents.

Eventually, on 22 January 1877, as a result of repeatedly ignoring the decisions of the Court of Arches, he was taken into custody for contempt of court and imprisoned at London's Horsemonger Lane Gaol. This action immediately transformed him in the eyes of Anglo-Catholics from a rebel into a Christian martyr and his story became national headline news.

The agitations that resulted from his arrest and imprisonment played a central role in bringing the Public Worship Regulation Act into disrepute. His conviction was quashed on a technicality.

=== 1880 protest poster ===
A copy of this poster was also fixed to a wall close to Lambeth Palace, which greatly annoyed Archbishop Archibald Campbell Tait.

THE VICTORIAN PERSECUTION, HISTORY REPEATS ITSELF

BC

533 Three Jews cast into a Fiery Furnace for conscience’ sake.

583 Daniel cast into the Den of Lions for conscience’ sake.

AD

28 S. John the Baptist cast into prison for conscience’ sake.

Illustration from Punch magazine showing Archbishop Tait trying to control the "Ritualist black sheep" with his crook called the "Public Worship Regulation Bill"

32 Our Blessed Lord Crucified to vindicate "the Law."

51 SS. Peter and John cast into Prison for Preaching Christ.

55 S. Stephen stoned to death for conscience’ sake.

68 SS. Peter and Paul put to death for conscience’ sake.

1555 Hooper, Ridley and Latimer burned for conscience’ sake.

1556 Cranmer burnt for conscience’ sake.

1876 Arthur Tooth imprisoned for conscience’ sake.

1880 T. Pelham Dale, R.W. Enraght, for conscience’ sake, and.

They are in Gaol now, in this year 1880 of Our Lord, and 43rd of Victoria, and, by

God's Grace, may they light such a candle as shall never be put out

== Later career ==
The whole experience of the prosecution had a devastating effect on Tooth's health and he was only nominally in charge of St James' until November 1878. He lived for a further 52 years, but was never again given charge of a parish. Furthermore, he had no desire for fame or notoriety. In 1878, he had acquired a property in Woodside, Croydon, where he established a chapel, convent and orphanage school. He spent the rest of his life involved in the running of the orphanage and providing assistance to the convent. The site is now Ashburton Park. He also produced the text for an illustrated book entitled The Pagan Man (1914?) published by the convent at Woodside with illustrations by Thomas Derrick.

In 1927, Tooth moved to Otford Court near Sevenoaks with his school of 27 boys plus three religious sisters. The school became St Michael's Prep School, Otford, which still exists and was a boarding school until 1991. It started a pre-prep school in 1983 with just three children but is now co-educational with over 400 pupils.

== Death ==
Arthur Tooth died at Otford on 5 March 1931 and was buried in Crystal Palace District Cemetery. There is a memorial in the Anglican chapel at Walsingham.
