= Chandler Holder Jones =

American Continuing Anglican bishop

The Most Reverend Chandler Holder Jones SSC
- Presiding Bishop of the Anglican Province of America and Bishop Ordinary of the Diocese of the Eastern United States
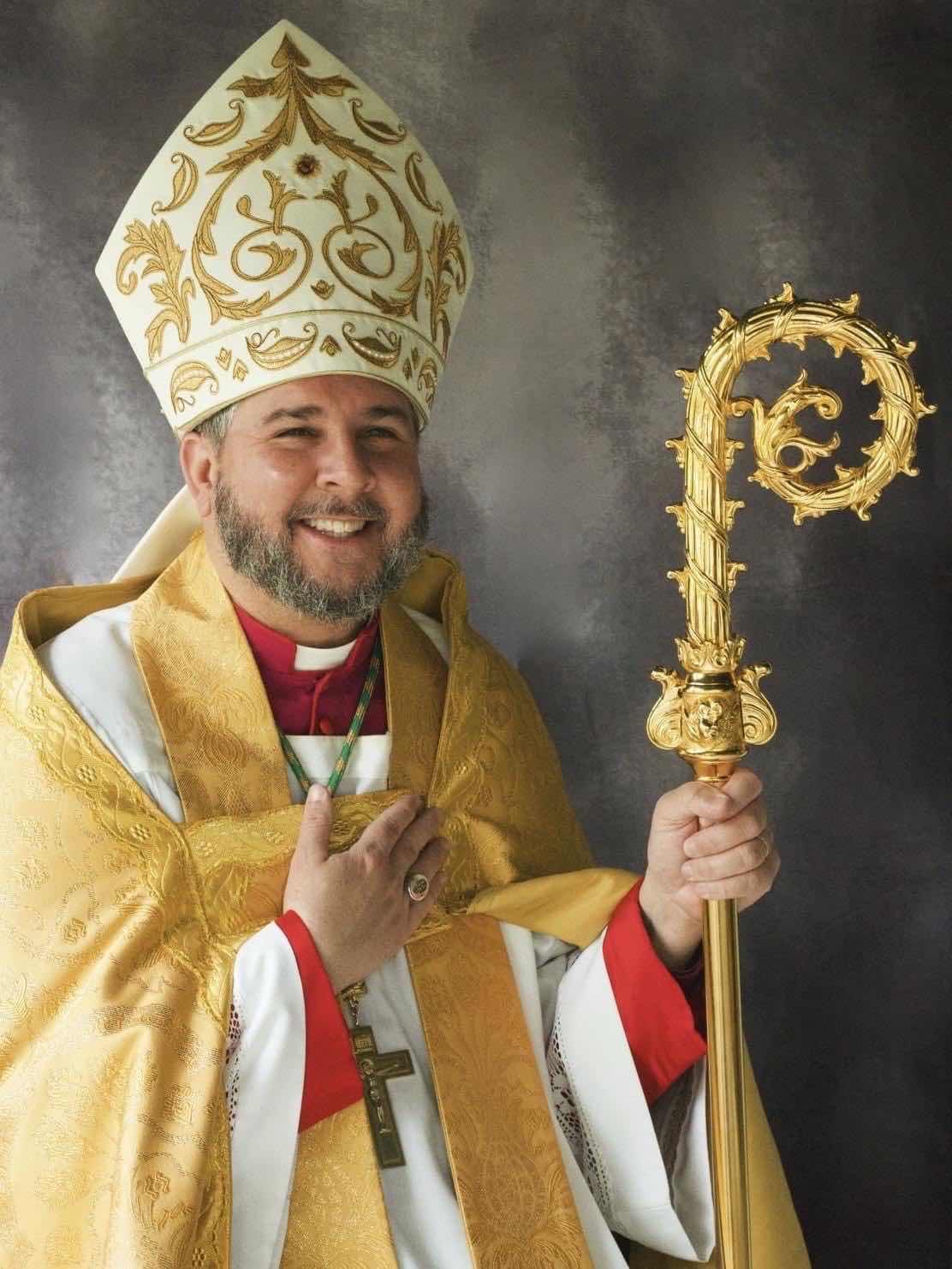
- Jones in 2023
- Church: Anglican Province of America
- Diocese: Diocese of the Eastern United States
- In office: Bishop Suffragan of the Diocese of the Eastern United States 2010 - 2019; Bishop Coadjutor of the Diocese of the Eastern United States 2019 - 2021; Bishop Ordinary Diocese of the Eastern United States 2021 - present Presiding Bishop 2021-present
- Predecessor: Walter Howard Grundorf

Orders
- Ordination: December 21, 1996 by John Thayer Cahoon, Jr.
- Consecration: September 18, 2010 by Walter Howard Grundorf

Personal details
- Born: April 20, 1971 (age 55) Greensboro, North Carolina

Chandler Holder Jones SSC (born April 20, 1971) is an American Continuing Anglican bishop. He is the presiding bishop of the Anglican Province of America (APA).

He is a native of Elkin in Surry County, North Carolina, and a graduate of Emory and Henry College (BA) and Duke University Divinity School (MDiv). Additionally, he has studied English literature at Exeter College and the University of Oxford in England, and Anglican history at the King's School, Canterbury.

A convert to the Continuing Anglican movement, he has been an Anglo-Catholic for over 30 years. He was ordained a priest on December 21, 1996, and has served congregations in Virginia, Maryland, Florida, and Georgia. He was consecrated as bishop suffragan of the Diocese of the Eastern United States in 2010. The chief consecrator was the Most Rev. Walter Howard Grundorf, assisted by the Rt Rev. Larry Lee Shaver, the Rt. Rev. C. Peter Brewer, the Rt. Rev. Paul C. Hewett, the Rt. Rev. Clark Dorman, and the Rt. Rev. Arthur Rushlow. He elected bishop coadjutor in 2019. Upon Bishop Grundorf's retirement at the 53rd annual synod of the Diocese of the Eastern United States held in Dunwoody Georgia, on July 22, 2021, Jones was enthroned as the fourth bishop ordinary of the Diocese of the Eastern United States at the newly designated Saint Barnabas Cathedral in Dunwoody, Georgia. The following day, July 23, 2021, Jones was elected by the provincial synod as the new presiding bishop of the province and was installed by the retired presiding bishop. Walter Grundorf, at Saint Barnabas Cathedral. Jones is now the primate of the Anglican Province of America and metropolitan of the APA affiliated churches in India, Ecuador, the Philippines, and Haiti.

Jones addressed the International Catholic Congress of Anglicans in 2015, speaking on the topic of Anglican Catholic identity. Jones spoke at the Annual Anglican Theology Conference at Beeson Divinity School in 2018 about Anglo-Catholicism. The paper was published in The Future of Orthodox Anglicanism (Crossway, 2020).

Jones publishes on his personal blog, Philorthodox, and has contributed articles to Earth & Altar. He has also regularly appeared on various podcasts, especially The Sacramentalists, where he was invited to speak on the topic of Anglican orders, the Formularies, Zionism, and the Blessed Virgin Mary. He also regularly appears on the podcast Mining the Mysteries and has been interviewed by AnglicanTVMinistries. He serves on the board of directors of St. Dunstan's Academy in Roseland, Virginia.

He is married to Megan Baskwill Jones and they have four children.
