= Holyrood Episcopal Church =

Church in Manhattan, New York

- Holyrood Protestant Episcopal Church
- U.S. National Register of Historic Places
- New York State Register of Historic Places
- New York City Landmark
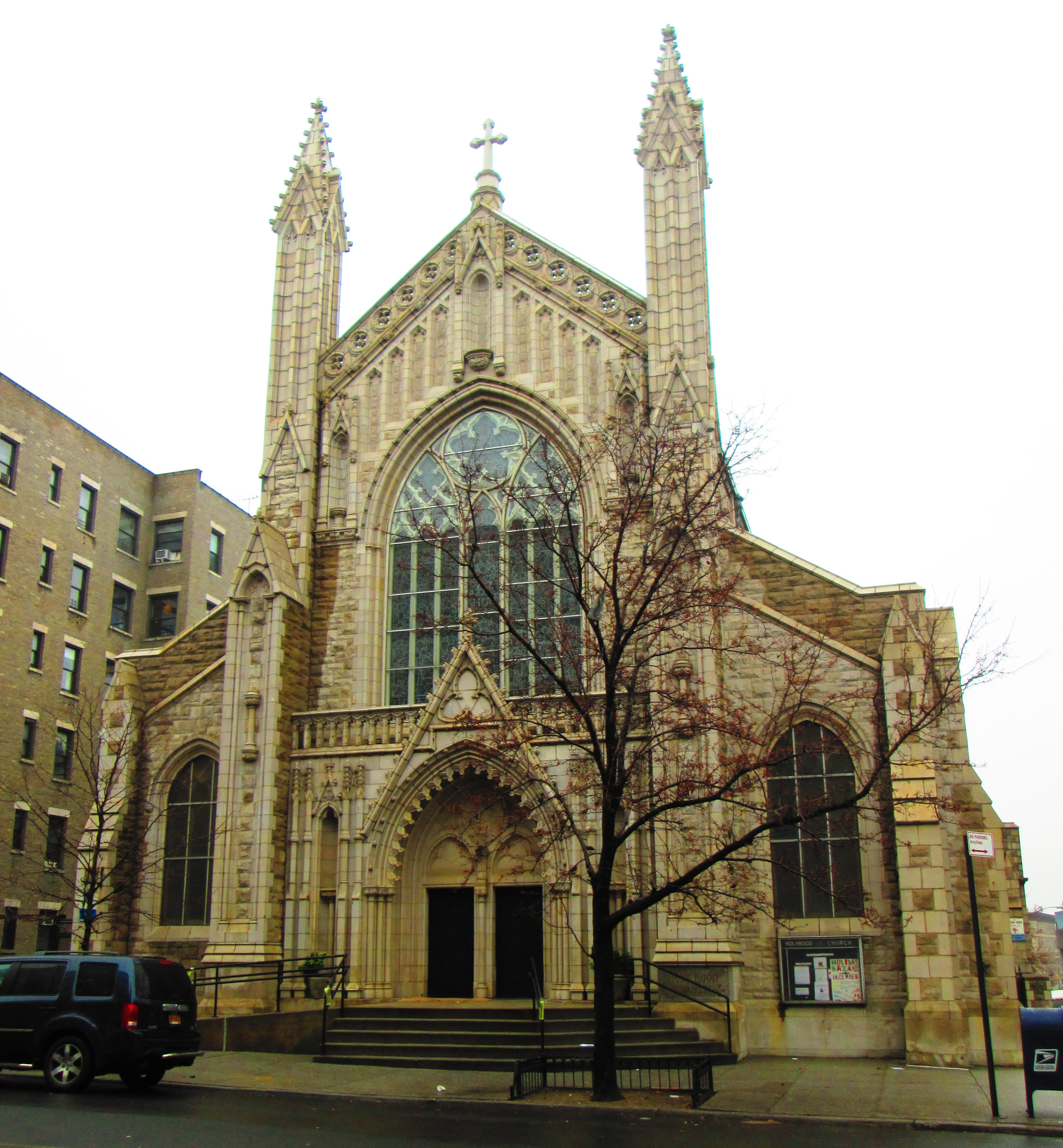

- Location within New York City Location within New York Location within the United States
- Location: 715 West 179th St., New York, New York
- Coordinates: 40°50′58″N 73°56′18″W
- Area: 0.4 acres (0.16 ha)
- Architect: Bannister & Schell
- Architectural style: Gothic revival
- NRHP reference No.: 100005702
- NYSRHP No.: 06101.014846
- NYCL No.: 2649

Significant dates
- Added to NRHP: 2020-10-29
- Designated NYSRHP: 2020-06-16
- Designated NYCL: 2021-05-18

Holyrood Episcopal Church is a Protestant Episcopal Church located at 715 West 179th Street in the Washington Heights neighborhood in Upper Manhattan, New York City.

== History ==
The church was founded in 1893 by the Rev. William Oliver Embury, who served as chaplain of the nearby House of Refuge for Problem Girls, and was operated by the Episcopal religious order, the Community of St. Mary, in what is now Inwood Hill Park at a time when upper Manhattan was an area of country houses located beyond the edge of the city. The congregation's first building, in country gothic style, was designed by R.D. Chandler and erected in 1895 on Broadway at what is now 181st Street. 1895, a country-style church with a tower, designed by R.D. Chandler, was built on upper Broadway at what is now 181st Street. The area urbanized rapidly, and in 1910 the congregation began to plan a new, larger Gothic revival building at Fort Washington Avenue and 179th Street. Designed by Bannister & Schell, it was ready for occupancy in 1914. The building was listed on the National Register of Historic Places in 2020 and designated as a New York City landmark in 2021.

The Rev. Gustav Cartensen was rector from 1919 to 1927. He came to Holyrood after his liberal positions on issues such as permitting black children from a nearby "Negro orphan asylum" led to his resignation from the pulpit of Christ Church (Bronx, New York) at the request of members of the vestry. He was then invited to take the pulpit at Holyrood where his "liberal" positions garnered "widespread publicity," according to The New York Times.

In 2017 the church took a humanitarian position when it agreed to grant "sanctuary" to a Guatemalan refugee scheduled for deportation. The woman is officially regarded as a "fugitive" by U.S. Immigration and Customs Enforcement.
