= The Catholic League =

Unitas: the Catholic League for the Unity of Christians is an organisation founded in the Church of England and dedicated to the full visible reconciliation of Anglicans and Roman Catholics as one Church. It is associated with the Anglo-Papalist wing of Anglo-Catholicism, from which its founders were drawn. Today, and especially since the formation of personal ordinariates, the League is ecumenical in membership.

== History ==
The League was founded in 1913 with 97 foundation members on the initiative of Richard Langford-James and Henry Fynes-Clinton. Its predecessors were the Association for the Promotion of the Unity of Christendom (established 1857) and the Guild of the Love of God (founded 1911). According to the League, "It was founded by Anglicans who believed passionately that the future of their Church lay in the reunion of all Christians in a common Catholic and Apostolic faith in restored full communion with the Successor of Peter in the see of Rome."

== Activities ==
A member of the Catholic Societies of the Church of England, the League supports the Week of Prayer for Christian Unity (formerly the Octave of Christian Unity), the work of the International Anglican-Roman Catholic Commission on Unity and Mission, and in the past, its predecessor, the Anglican-Roman Catholic International Commission. Associated with the Catholic League is the Sodality of the Precious Blood, a confraternity of male priests in the Church of England who pray the Liturgy of the Hours and practice celibacy.

== Bibliography ==
- Manual of the Catholic League (1932)
- L.G. Fisher, The Creed of the Council of Trent with Explanations (1954)

== See also ==
- Anglican–Roman Catholic dialogue
- Catholic societies of the Church of England
- Liberal Anglo-Catholicism
