= Public Worship Regulation Act 1874 =

Act of the Parliament of the United Kingdom

Public Worship Regulation Act 1874 (Note: Section 1.)
- Act of Parliament
- Parliament of the United Kingdom
- Long title: An Act for the better administration of the Laws respecting the regulation of Public Worship.
- Citation: 37 & 38 Vict. c. 85
- Introduced by: Archbishop of Canterbury Archibald Campbell Tait, 20 April 1874, private member's Bill (Lords)
- Territorial extent: England; Channel Islands; Isle of Man; (Note: Section 3.)

Dates
- Royal assent: 7 August 1874
- Commencement: 1 July 1875 (Note: Section 2.)
- Repealed: 1 March 1965
Other legislation
| Repealed by | Ecclesiastical Jurisdiction Measure 1963 |

Status: Repealed

Text of statute as originally enacted

The Public Worship Regulation Act 1874 (37 & 38 Vict. c. 85) was an act of the Parliament of the United Kingdom, introduced as a Private Member's Bill by Archbishop of Canterbury Archibald Campbell Tait, to limit what he perceived as the growing ritualism of Anglo-Catholicism and the Oxford Movement within the Church of England. The Bill was strongly endorsed by Prime Minister Benjamin Disraeli, and vigorously opposed by Liberal Party leader William Ewart Gladstone. Queen Victoria strongly supported it. The law was seldom enforced, but at least five clergymen were imprisoned by judges for contempt of court, which greatly embarrassed the Church of England archbishops who had vigorously promoted it.

== Tait's Bill ==
Tait's Bill was controversial. It was given government backing by Prime Minister Benjamin Disraeli, who called it "a bill to put down ritualism". He referred to the practices of the Oxford Movement as "a Mass in masquerade". Queen Victoria was supportive of the act's Protestant intentions. Liberal leader William Ewart Gladstone, a high church Anglican whose sympathies were for separation of church and state, felt disgusted that the liturgy was made, as he saw it, "a parliamentary football".

== The act ==
Before the act, the Church of England regulated its worship practices through the Arches Court with an appeal to the Judicial Committee of the Privy Council. The act established a new court, presided over by former Divorce Court judge Lord Penzance. Many citizens were scandalised by parliamentary interference with worship and, moreover, by its proposed supervision by a secular court. The act gave bishops the discretionary power to order a stay of proceedings.

Section 8 of the act allows an archdeacon, church warden, or three adult male parishioners of a parish to serve on the bishop a representation, in their opinion:

1. That in such church any alteration in or addition to the fabric, ornaments, or furniture thereof has been made without lawful authority, or that any decoration forbidden by law has been introduced into such church; or,
2. That the incumbent has within the preceding twelve months used or permitted to be used in such church or burial ground any unlawful ornament of the minister of the church, or neglected to use any prescribed ornament or vesture; or,
3. That the incumbent has within the preceding twelve months failed to observe, or to cause to be observed, the directions contained in the Book of Common Prayer relating to the performance, in such church or burial ground, of the services, rites and ceremonies ordered by the said book, or has made or has permitted to be made any unlawful addition to, alteration of, or omission from such services, rites and ceremonies

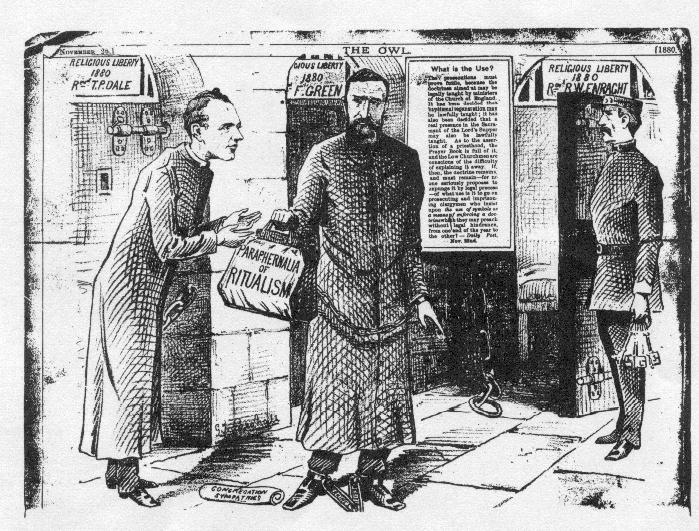
Illustration of Fr. Richard Enraght entering Warwick Prison in 1880

The bishop had the discretion to stay proceedings but, if he allowed them to proceed, the parties had the opportunity to submit to his direction with no right of appeal. The bishop was able to issue a monition, but if the parties did not agree to his jurisdiction, then the matter was to be sent for trial (section 9).

The act provided a casus belli for the Anglo-Catholic English Church Union and the evangelical Church Association. Many clergy were brought to trial, and five were ultimately imprisoned for contempt of court.

== List of clergy imprisoned ==
Five Anglo-Catholic ritualist clergymen were tried and sentenced to prison terms under the act:

- Arthur Tooth, vicar of St James's, Hatcham, 1877
- Thomas Pelham Dale, rector of St Vedast Foster Lane, in the City of London, 1880
- Richard William Enraght, rector of Holy Trinity, Bordesley, West Midlands, 1880
- Sidney Faithorn Green, rector of St John's, Miles Platting, Manchester, 1881–82
- James Bell Cox, vicar of St Margaret's, Liverpool, 1887

These clergy were supported financially by George Boyle, 6th Earl of Glasgow, who donated considerable sums to their defence and compensation.

Prosecutions ended when a Royal Commission in 1906 recognised the legitimacy of pluralism in worship, but the act remained in force for 91 years until it was repealed on 1 March 1965 by the Ecclesiastical Jurisdiction Measure 1963.

== Territorial extent ==
The act extended to England, the Channel Islands and the Isle of Man.

== Subsequent developments ==
The whole act was repealed by section 87 of, and the fifth schedule to, the Ecclesiastical Jurisdiction Measure 1963 (No. 1), which came into force on 1 March 1965.

== See also ==
- Anglican eucharistic theology

== Bibliography ==
- Bebbington, David (1993). William Ewart Gladstone: Faith and Politics in Victorian Britain. Wm. B. Eerdmans. ISBN 978-0-8028-0152-4.
- Chadwick, Owen (2010). The Victorian Church. Vol. Part Two: 1860-1901. Wipf & Stock. ISBN 978-1-60899-262-1.
- Cross, F.L., ed. (1959). The Oxford Dictionary of the Christian Church. London: Oxford University Press.
- Douglas, David Charles (1996). English Historical Documents. Routledge. ISBN 0-415-14374-8.
- Howell, Peter; Saint, Andrew, eds. (2017). Butterfield Revisited: Studies in Victorian Architecture and Design. Vol. 6. The Victorian Society.
- Jenkins, R. (1995). Gladstone. Macmillan. ISBN 0-333-60216-1.
- Murray, D.L. (2005) [1927]. Disraeli. Kessinger. ISBN 0-7661-9892-8.
- Simpson, W.J. Sparrow (1933). "The revival from 1845 to 1933". In Williams, Norman Powell; Harris, Charles (eds.). Northern Catholicism: centenary studies in the Oxford and parallel movements. SPCK.
- Yates, N. (1999). Anglican Ritualism in Victorian Britain, 1830–1910. Oxford University Press. ISBN 0-19-826989-7.
