= John Purchas =

John Purchas (born at Cambridge, 14 July 1823; died at Brighton, 18 October 1872) was an author and a priest of the Church of England who was prosecuted for ritualist practices.

== Life ==
He was the son of William Jardine Purchas RN and his wife Jane Hills. He received his education at Bury St Edmunds, Rugby School and Christ's College, Cambridge (B.A., 1844; M.A., 1847). He was curate of Elsworth, Cambridgeshire, 1851–53, of Orwell in the same county, 1856–59, and of St Paul's Church, Brighton, 1861–66 (where he was a curate of Henry Michell Wagner); and perpetual curate of St James' Chapel, Brighton, after 1866.

== Prosecution for ritualism ==
His curacy in St James' is significant because of the direct contribution which was made through it to the controversy concerning ritualism in the Anglican church. Purchas introduced the use of vestments such as the cope, chasuble, alb, biretta, etc., and used lighted candles on the altar, crucifixes, images, and holy water, together with processions, incense, and the like. On 27 November 1869, he was accordingly charged before the Court of Arches with infringing the law of the established church; he did not appear to answer, giving as reasons his poverty, which prevented him from securing legal assistance, and ill-health. The case concerned interpretation of the Ornaments Rubric. Sir Robert Phillimore was Dean of the Arches at the time.

Decision was rendered against him on 3 February 1870, but in terms which did not please Col. Charles James Elphinstone, who had brought the suit. Elphinstone appealed for a fuller condemnation, which was obtained on 16 May 1871 (Elphinstone, the original prosecutor, died before the case reached the Privy Council, so the case was brought by a Mr Hebbert) the decision going against Purchas in all points. Purchas had put his property out of his hands, and so could not be made to pay costs; moreover, he did not discontinue the illegal practices, and was suspended for twelve months; but in spite of this he continued his services until his death. The decision caused a controversy which extended over a considerable period and involved the leaders in the Anglican church.

== Purchas' writings ==
Purchas' most important literary achievement was the editing of Directorium Anglicanum: being a Manual of Directions for the right Celebration of the Holy Communion, for the Saying of Matins and Evensong, and for the Performance of the other Rites and Ceremonies of the Church (London, 1858; a standard work on Anglican ritualism). He was also the author of a comedy (The Miser's Daughter or the Lover's Curse, 1839), several poems, including Poems and Ballads (1846); The Book of Feasts; Sermons (1853); The Priest's Dream: an Allegory (1856); and The Death of Ezekiel's Wife: Three Sermons (1866).
