= Society of Catholic Priests =

Clergy society in the Anglican Communion

Symbol of the Society of Catholic Priests

The Society of Catholic Priests (SCP) is a religious society of clergy in the Anglican Communion which draws its membership from Anglicans who consider themselves a part of the liberal Anglo-Catholic tradition.

== Founding and early history ==
The society was founded in 1984 by a group of priests from the Diocese of Southwark who felt that they could no longer remain within the existing fraternal organizations for Anglo-Catholic priests, such as the Society of the Holy Cross, which had taken conservative positions on the ordination of women to the priesthood. Its objective is to promote the formation and support of priestly spirituality and Catholic evangelism. The former Archbishop of Canterbury, Justin Welby, is the group's current patron.

In 2009, a group of priests and seminarians from the Episcopal Church and the Anglican Church of Canada gathered at Christ Church, New Haven, Connecticut, to form a North American province of the society, known as the Society of Catholic Priests in the Episcopal Church and the Anglican Church of Canada (often abbreviated SCP NA). An Australian province was also created in 2009.

In the United States, the organization has the EIN 27–0678618 as a 501(c)(3) Public Charity under the name "Society of Catholic Priests in the USA and Canada" and an Alexandria, Virginia headquarters.

== Current life ==
Membership in the SCP UK is open to all Anglican priests who accept the Anglican Communion as part of the "one, holy, catholic, and apostolic church", who recognise the ordination of women priests, believe in the real presence and who uphold the traditional view of the seven sacraments. Priests keep a rule of life which includes the daily offices of Mattins and Evensong, Eucharistic-centred spirituality, use of a spiritual director, the sacrament of confession and praying for and ministering to other SCP members. Deacons may become associate members. The Society of Catholic Priests is associated with the Dearmer Society, for ordinands who aspire to full membership of SCP, and the Company of Servers, for lay people who serve at the altar.

In the SCP NA, membership is open to all Anglican clergy who; A) believe that the churches of the Anglican Communion are part of the one holy and catholic and apostolic church; B) are members of The Episcopal Church or the Anglican Church of Canada; C) embrace as colleagues all those admitted to holy orders in the same; D) believe in the real presence of Christ in the Eucharist; E) embrace the sacramental life of the Church as means of God's grace; F) and keep the rule of life of the society. In the SCP NA, professed but unordained members of religious communities may also be admitted as full members. Seminarians and seminary graduates preparing for ordination may be admitted as "provisional members", becoming full members automatically upon their diaconal ordination.

Members of the society are entitled to use the letters SCP after their names.

== List of rectors general ==
- Jack Bright (2000–2005)
- Jonathan Clark (2005–2008)
- Andrew Nunn (2008–2017)
- Ian Gomersall (2018–present)

== See also ==
- Liberal Anglo-Catholicism
