= Company of Servers =

Company of Servers

The Company of Servers (CoS) is a society within the Anglican Communion for lay people whose vocation includes serving at the altar. It was inaugurated on 24 January 2009 at Southwark Cathedral.

It is formed of many chapters based on diocesan boundaries, with the first chapters being inaugurated in the dioceses of Norwich, Exeter, and Ripon and Leeds.

Each chapter appoints a chaplain who is a member of the Society of Catholic Priests and members of the Company uphold a rule of life which includes:

- centre their spiritual life on the Eucharist, by sharing in the celebration this sacrament on Sundays and Principal Feasts and Principal Holy Days
- devote a period each day to private prayer
- make use, as appropriate and according to conscience, of a spiritual director and the sacrament of reconciliation
- befriend other members of the company and attend all meetings of their chapter and central festivals, unless prevented by good reason.
