= Church Association =

English evangelical Anglican organisation

Church Association "Protestant Van" from a postcard dated March 1907

The Church Association was an English evangelical Anglican organisation founded in 1865. It was particularly active in opposition to Anglo-Catholicism, ritualism, and the Oxford Movement. Founded in 1865 by Richard P. Blakeney, the association stated in its first annual report that the objectives of the association were, "To uphold the principles and order of the United Church of England and Ireland, and to counteract the efforts now being made to assimilate her services to those of the Church of Rome."

== Litigation ==
As well as publishing information (including its Church Association Tracts) and holding public meetings, controversially, this also involved instigating legal action against Anglo-Catholics under the Public Worship Regulation Act 1874; for instance, legal action was taken against Sidney Faithorn Green and Richard William Enraght. According to the association this was intended to clarify the law; however, the ritualists refusal to comply with court verdicts, coupled with the bishops unwillingness to act eventually led to such legal action not being pursued.

== Active members ==
Reverend Thomas Henry Sparshott was organising secretary of the Church Association between 1881 and c. 1899, and deputation secretary from 1893. He preached and lectured at various venues in England.

== Merger and Church Society ==
In 1950, the association merged with the National Church League to form the Church Society.
