= Arches Court =

Ecclesiastical court of the Church of England

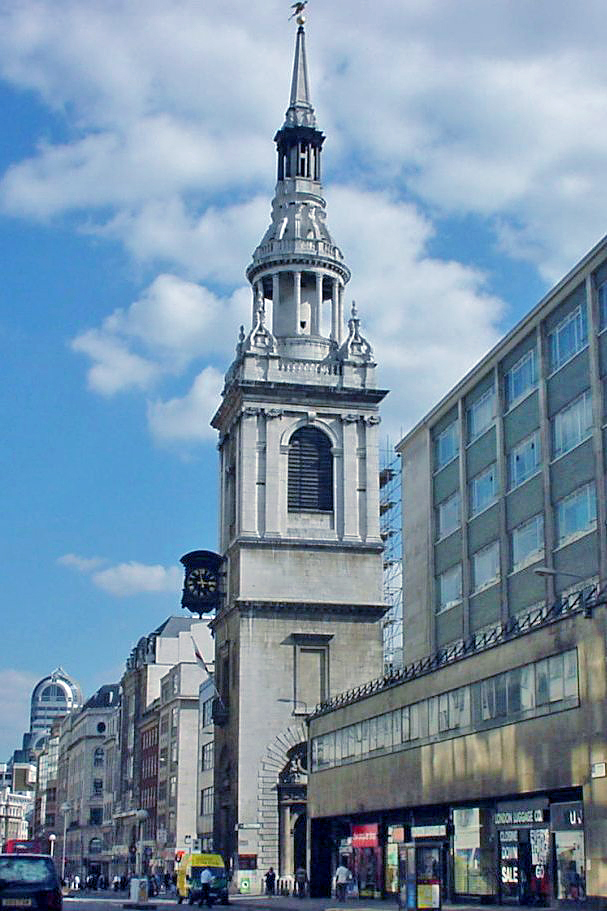
The Arches Court's permanent home is St Mary-le-Bow in the City of London.

The Arches Court or Court of Arches, presided over by the Dean of Arches, is an ecclesiastical court of the Church of England covering the Province of Canterbury. Its equivalent in the Province of York is the Chancery Court.

It takes its name from the street-level arched windows of the old crypt of St Mary-le-Bow (Sancta Maria de Arcubus) where the court still sits.

== Provincial court ==
The Court of Arches is the provincial Court of Appeal for Canterbury. It has both appellate and original jurisdiction. It is presided over by the Dean of the Arches, who is styled The Right Honourable and Right Worshipful the Official Principal and Dean of the Arches. The dean must be a barrister of ten years' High Court standing or the holder or former holder of high judicial office. The appointment is made by the two archbishops jointly.

At various times the court has sat in the church of St Mary-le-Bow (Sancta Maria de arcubus, formerly the archbishop's principal peculiar in London), whose arches give the court its name. The court used to sit in a large room over the north aisle of the 11th-century crypt adjoining Bow Lane. The room was later rebuilt on an even larger scale, and eventually came to be used as the vestry. After the Great Fire it was held in Doctors' Commons and also at 1 The Sanctuary, Westminster and St Paul's Cathedral. Its permanent home remains St Mary le Bow, where regular sittings include those to confirm the election of each new diocesan bishop in the province. The Provincial Registry is at 16 Beaumont Street, Oxford.

The proper jurisdiction of the court is over only the 13 peculiar parishes belonging to the archbishop in London. But, as the office of Dean of the Arches is united with that of Principal Official, the dean receives and determines appeals from the sentences of all lesser ecclesiastical courts within the province. Many original suits are also heard, where lesser courts waive jurisdiction by letters of request. Appeal lies with the Privy Council, except on matters of doctrine, ritual or ceremony, which go to the Court for Ecclesiastical Causes Reserved.

There may also be a Deputy Dean. The court normally consists of the dean, two clerks appointed by the prolocutor of the lower house of the appropriate convocation and two lay people appointed by the Chairman of the House of Laity in consultation with the Lord Chancellor. Such appointees will have had judicial experience and be diocesan chancellors. Since 1991 there have been two diocesan chancellors appointed by the dean. All these are assistant provincial court judges.

Original jurisdiction was formerly exercised by a separate provincial court, known as the Court of Audience.

== History ==
The jurisdictions called "peculiers" at one time numbered nearly three hundred in England. They were originally introduced by the Pope for the purpose of curtailing a bishop's authority within his diocese. The dean of the Arches originally had jurisdiction over the thirteen London parishes mentioned above, but as the official principal was often absent as ambassador on the continent, the dean became his substitute, and gradually the two offices were blended together. The judge of the Arches court was until 1874 appointed by the Archbishop of Canterbury for the life of the holder. But by the Public Worship Regulation Act 1874 the two archbishops were empowered to appoint a practising barrister or judge as described above.

The official principal of the Arches court is the only ecclesiastical judge who is empowered to pass a sentence of deprivation against a clerk in holy orders. The appeals from the decisions of the Arches court were formerly made to the king in chancery, but they are now by statute addressed to the king in council, and they are heard before the Judicial Committee of the Privy Council. By an act of Henry VIII (Ecclesiastical Jurisdiction Act 1532) the Arches court is empowered to hear, in the first instance, such suits as are sent up to it by letters of request from the consistory court of the bishops of the province of Canterbury, and it is further empowered to accept letters of request from the bishops of the province of Canterbury after they have issued commissions of inquiry under that statute, and the commissioners have made their report. The Arches court was also the court of appeal from the consistory courts (of the bishops of the province) in all testamentary and matrimonial causes. The matrimonial jurisdiction was transferred to the secular courts by the Matrimonial Causes Act 1857 and testamentary jurisdiction by later statute.

== Leadership ==
The Provincial Registrar of Canterbury is appointed by the archbishop, after consultation with the Standing Committee of the General Synod. There may be a deputy provincial registrar. The provincial registrar acts as legal advisor to the archbishop, the registrar of the provincial court and the joint registrar of the General Synod.

== Archives ==
The archives of the court have been held since 1953 at Lambeth Palace Library. They include items dating back to the early fourteenth century, but only survive with any consistency from 1660 onwards.

== See also ==
- Ecclesiastical court § Church of England
