= Hatcham =

Manor and chapelry in Surrey, England

Coordinates: 51.4720°N 0.0450°W

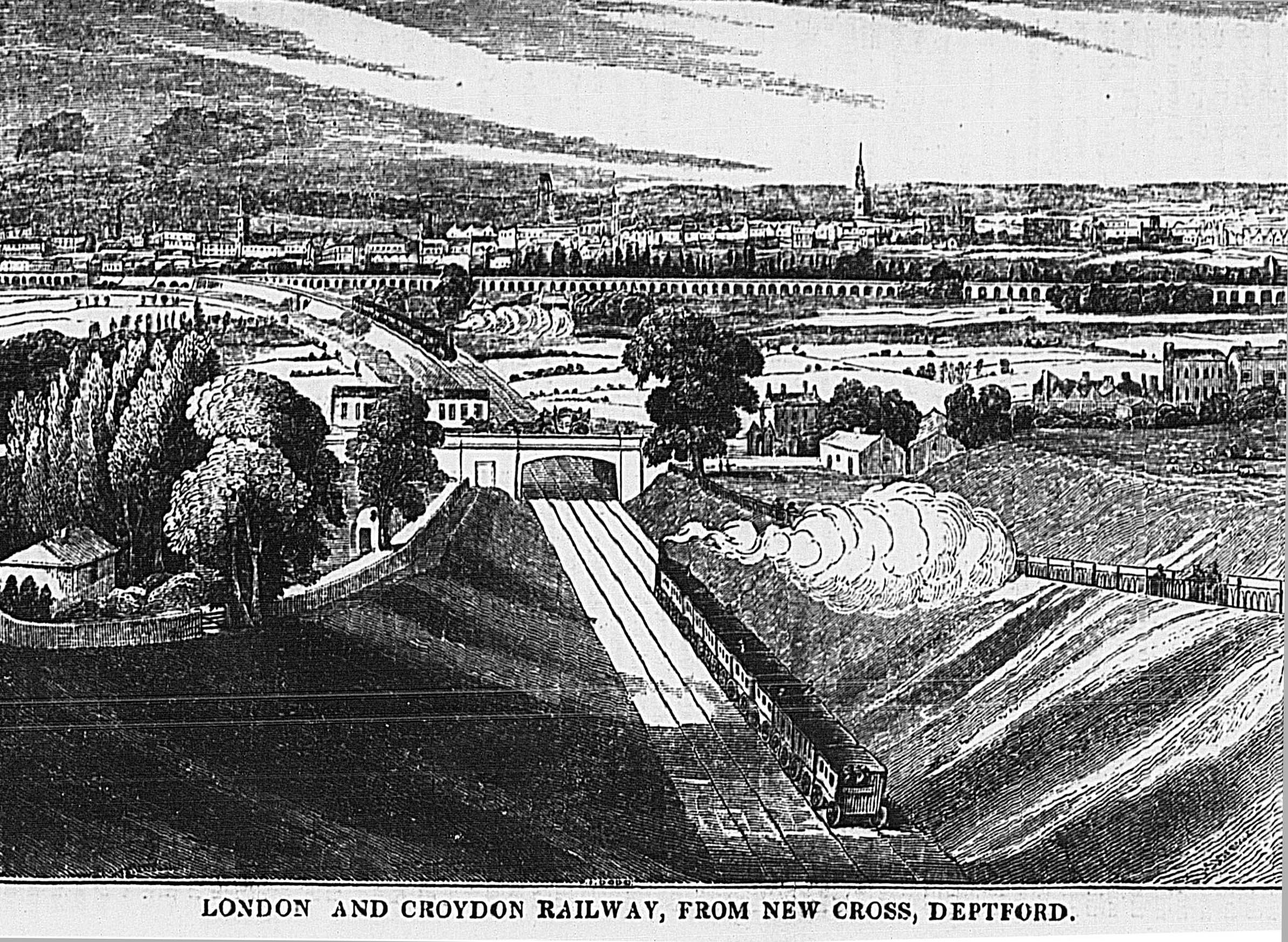
Hatcham/New Cross in 1839

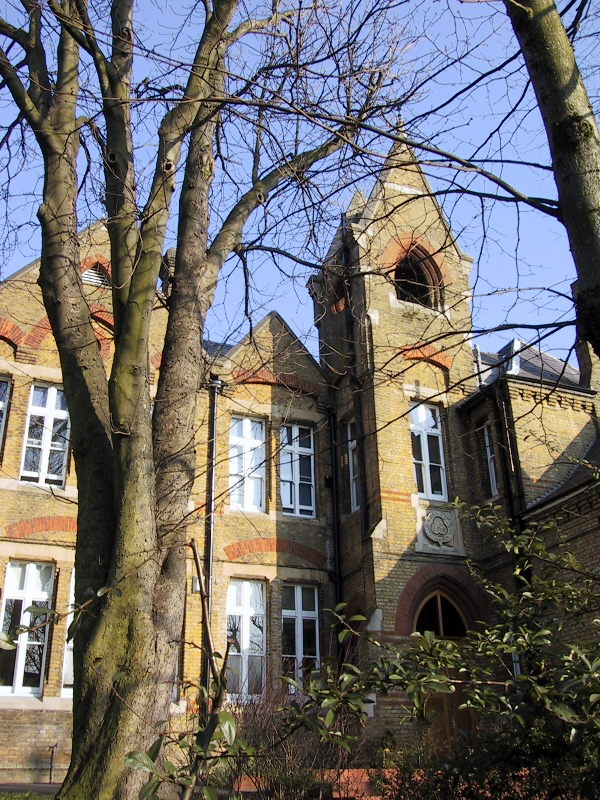
Haberdashers' Hatcham College on Pepys Road, London SE14

Hatcham was a manor and later a chapelry in what is now London, England. It largely corresponds to the area around New Cross in the London Borough of Lewisham.

The ancient parish of Deptford straddled the counties of Surrey and Kent and there came to be a doubt about which county jurisdiction the manor of Hatcham came under. In 1636, the matter was settled by placing it entirely within Surrey. Hatcham became part of Deptford St Paul when the parish was divided in 1730.

It has lent its name to the ecclesiastical parishes of All Saints' Hatcham Park, St Catherine's Hatcham, and St James' Hatcham, as the Church of England has thus far avoided the neologism New Cross which came in after the railways were built.

In the Domesday Book it is recorded as Hacheham. The name means "home of a man named Hæcci" and derives from an Old English personal name. It is described as a manor containing land for three ploughs, nine villagers and two smallholders, 6 acres (24,000 m^{2}) of meadowland and woodland for 3 pigs.

Hatcham formed part of the Brixton Hundred of Surrey in medieval times. The manor was bought by the Haberdashers' Company in 1614, which later demolished the former manor house (during the 1840s) for redevelopment and the foundation of its schools.

Hatcham has been included within the Metropolitan Police District since 1830. In 1855 it was included in the area of responsibility of the Metropolitan Board of Works, in the Greenwich District. It became part of the County of London in 1889 and the Metropolitan Borough of Deptford in 1900.

Although the place name has largely fallen out of common parlance, its use is retained by several organisations including the Hatcham Liberal Club on Queen's Road and in the names of Haberdashers' Hatcham College. Hatcham also constitutes a conservation area nowadays for planning purposes. The area largely corresponds to the contemporary district known as New Cross Gate.

== See also ==
- Worshipful Company of Haberdashers
- Arthur Tooth
