= Divine Worship: Daily Office =

Current Anglican Use Divine Office of the Catholic Church

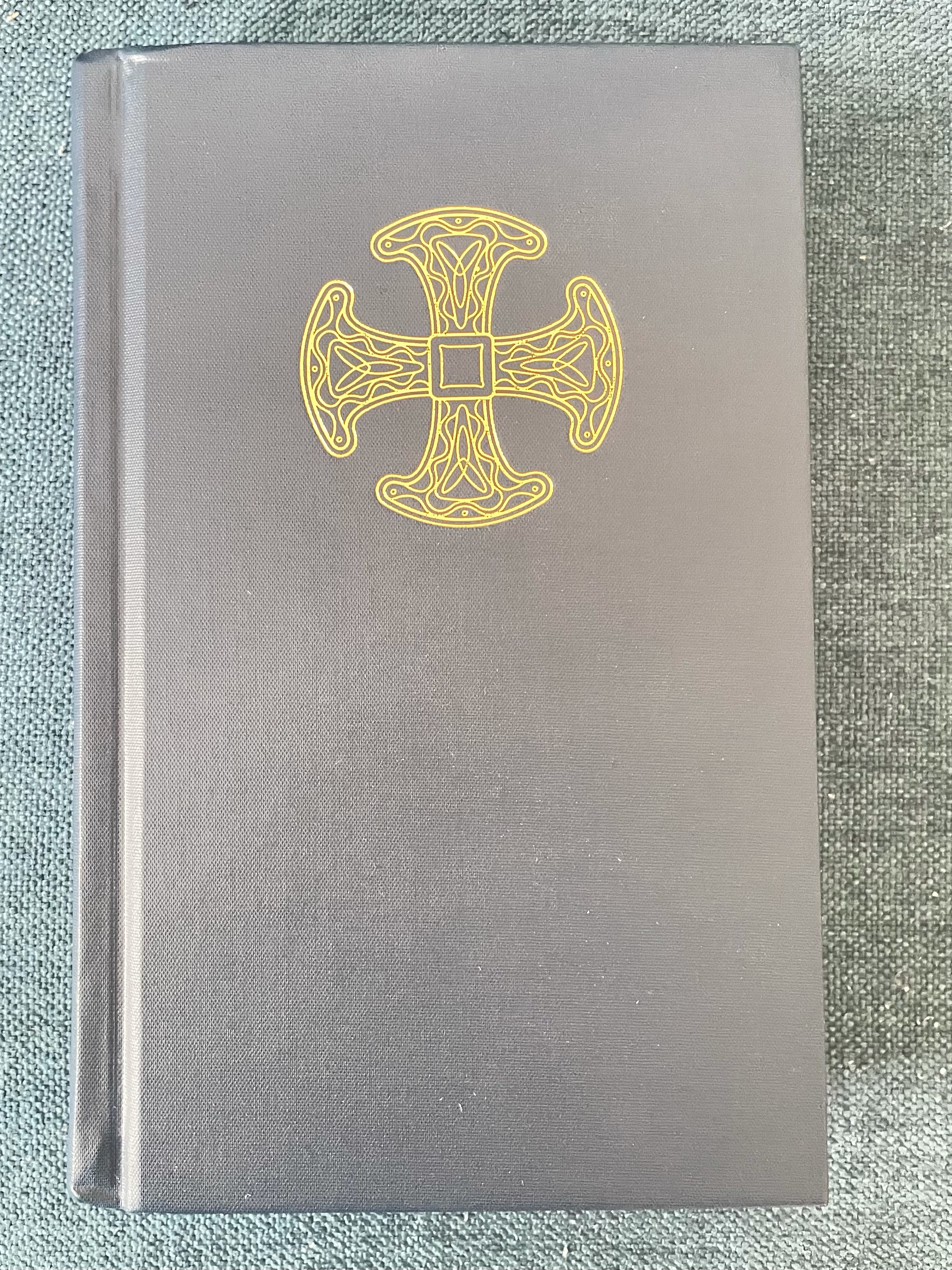
Cover of first edition Divine Worship: Daily Office: North American Edition

The Divine Worship: Daily Office is the series of approved liturgical books of the Anglican Use Divine Offices for the personal ordinariates in the Catholic Church. Derived from multiple Anglican and Catholic sources, the Divine Worship: Daily Office replaces prior Anglican Use versions of the Liturgy of the Hours and the Anglican daily office. Alongside other Anglican Use books officially known as "Divine Worship", including the Divine Worship: The Missal, Divine Worship: Daily Office is considered a liturgical use of the Roman Rite.

There are two editions, both published in English. The North American Edition is meant for use by Personal Ordinariate of the Chair of Saint Peter in the United States and Canada. The Commonwealth Edition is for use by the Personal Ordinariate of Our Lady of Walsingham in the United Kingdom and Ireland as well as the Personal Ordinariate of Our Lady of the Southern Cross in Australia, Japan, and Oceania.

== History ==
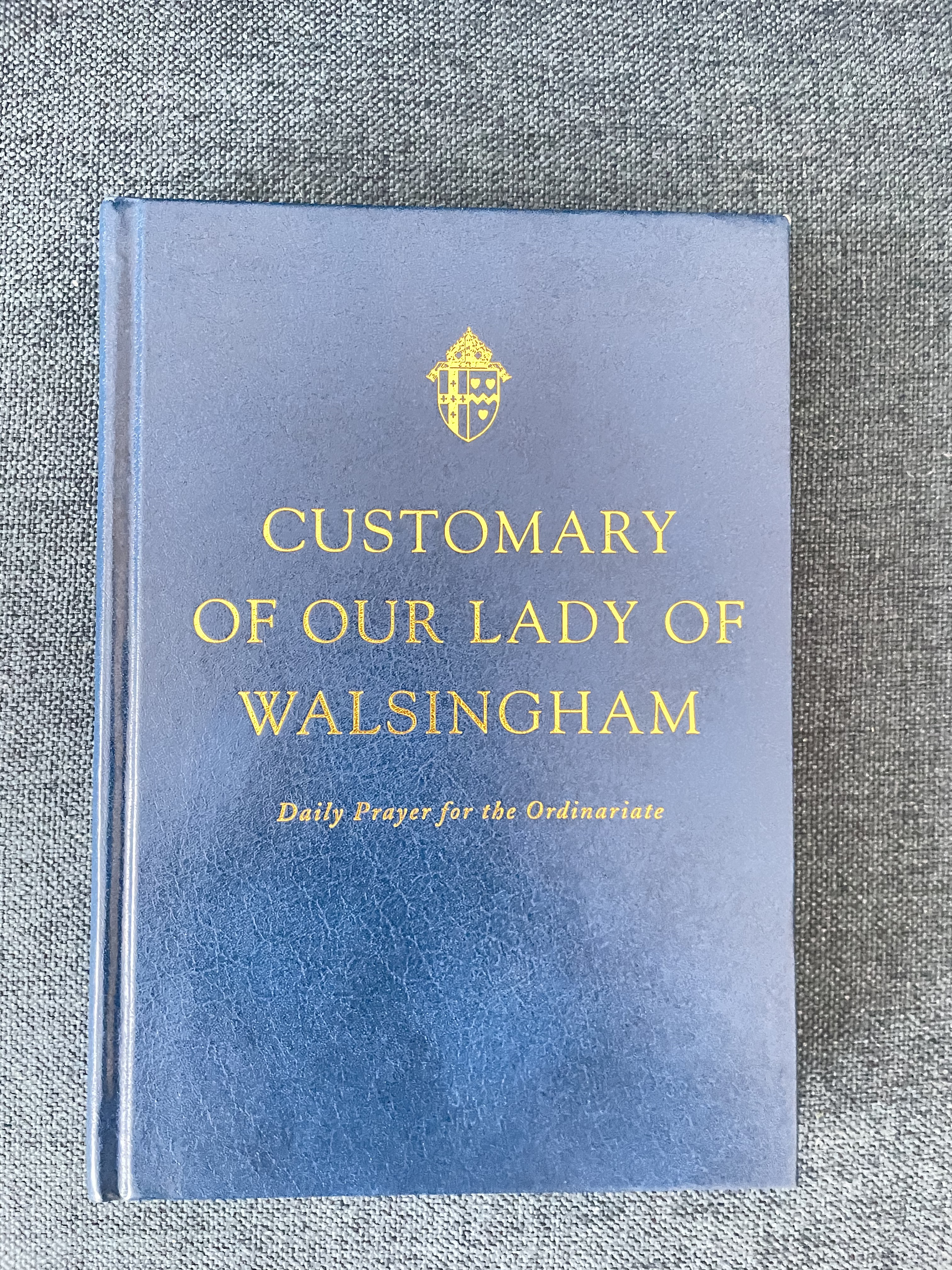
The Customary of Our Lady of Walsingham, an interim Anglican Use breviary

Multiple attempts to create an Anglican Use form of the Divine Office had been attempted prior to the approval the Divine Worship: Daily Office. The Book of Divine Worship of 2003 closely followed the Mattins and Evensong practices of the 1979 Book of Common Prayer of the Episcopal Church. Unlike later editions and in keeping with lineage from the Book of Common Prayer, the Book of Divine Worship contained both the order of the Anglican Use Mass and Office, resulting in an extremely large book.

The Customary of Our Lady of Walsingham, printed by Canterbury Press in 2012 and in use until the introduction of the Divine Worship: Daily Office: Commonwealth Edition, more closely follows Catholic practices. Additions included Terce, Sext, and None. Unlike the previous Book of Divine Worship, the Customary exclusively contained the Office and thus proved far more wieldy, with Divine Worship: The Missal and its new order of the Anglican Use Mass being published separately.

== Editions ==
Unlike the other forms and uses of the Roman Rite that use the General Roman Calendar of 1960 and some Anglo-Catholic sources including the Anglican Breviary that use the General Roman Calendar of 1955, the Anglican Use liturgical calendar does not contain a period known as Ordinary Time. Instead, the traditional Anglican kalendar is used as the basis from which liturgical seasons are determined.

=== North American Edition ===
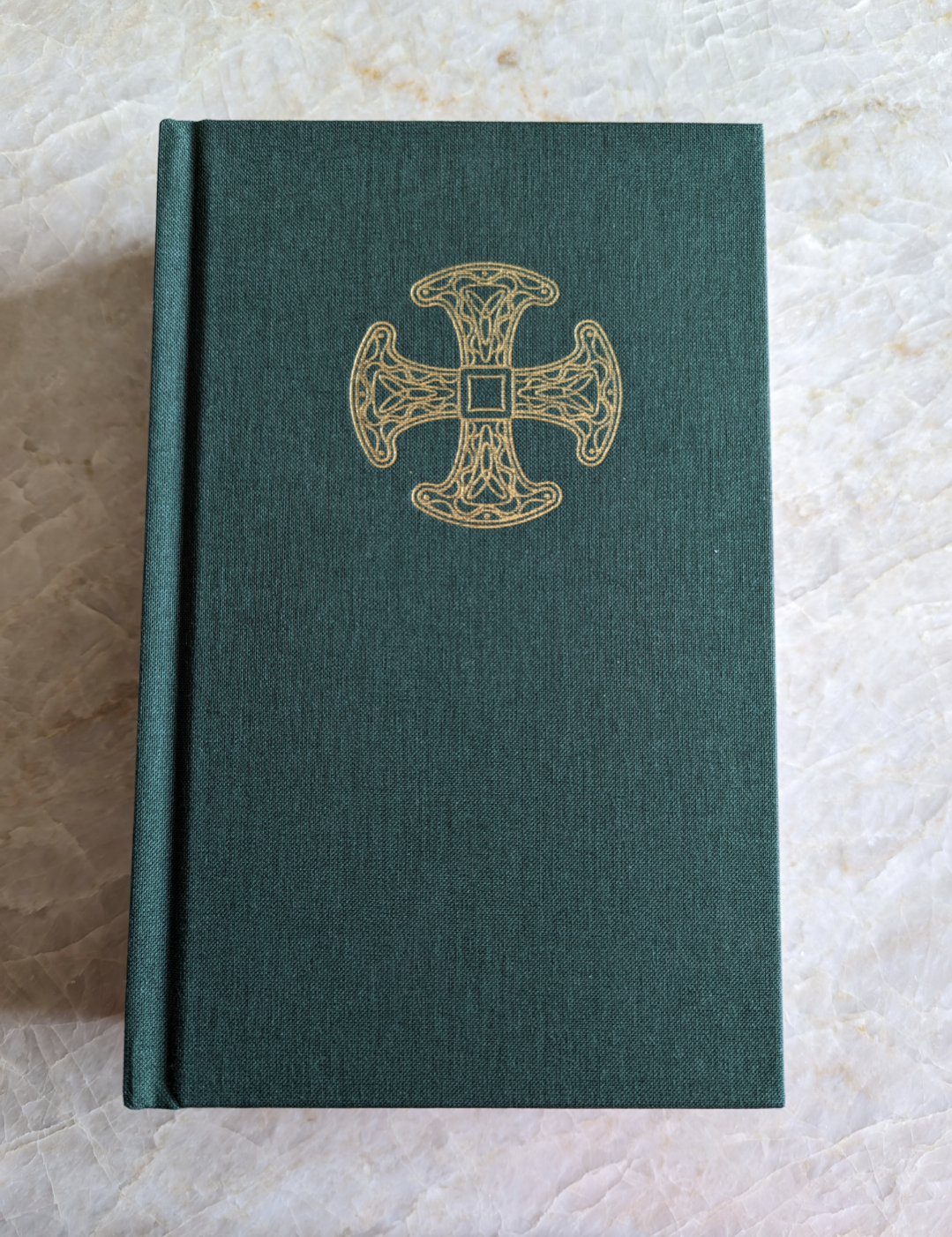
2022 edition of Divine Worship: Daily Office: North American Edition

The Divine Worship: Daily Office: North American Edition is printed by Newman House Press and was released in late 2020. The first printing of 500 books quickly sold out to parish communities, with further printings being announced shortly after.

The psalm translation is that of the 1928 Episcopal revision of the Coverdale Psalter. Permutations of the Coverdale Psalter are used in many Anglican Books of Common Prayer including the 1662 Book of Common Prayer of the Church of England and 1928 Book of Common Prayer of the Episcopal Church. Collects and other excerpts come from Divine Worship: The Missal, which itself sources from the Anglican Missal and other Anglo-Catholic texts.

Following the initial printing, several significant textual errata were noted, along with several dozen typographical errors. Among them, the latter half of the hour of None was missing. There were also complaints regarding specific omissions–such as prayers for popular English saints like Thomas Becket–as well as several popular hymns from the English Christian tradition. These concerns and other were anticipated to be in part addressed during the North American Edition's second printing. The second printing was released in May 2021 and featured several corrections, including adding the missing portion of None. However, this new edition also introduced the omission of other portions of None–specifically the readings for Monday, Tuesday, and Wednesday–as well as errors in collects and commons.

=== Commonwealth Edition ===
The Divine Worship: Daily Office: Commonwealth Edition is printed by the Catholic Truth Society. Announced in 2020 and following the high demand for the North American Edition, in December 2020 CTS attempted to determine interest for release in 2021. A 14 September release date and pre-orders were announced on 16 June 2021. The Commonwealth Edition uses the 1662 revision of the Coverdale psalter in keeping with Church of England tradition. In contrast to the North American Edition, the Commonwealth Edition contains the full text of the scriptural lessons for Morning Prayer and Evening Prayer. This feature is not common, but also not unheard of, in the Anglican Prayer Book tradition, and users are encouraged to read from a separate Bible via lectern during times of corporate prayer. The initial run of the Commonwealth Edition was favorably received, necessitating additional printings.

During the daily course of "lesser hours" of the Commonwealth Edition–Prime, Terce, Sext, and None – the entirety of Psalm 119 is recited. A selection of occasional prayers and optional antiphons are also provided. In 2022, the Personal Ordinariate of Our Lady of Walsingham released a series of videos teaching proper usage of the Commonwealth Edition, each filmed within Slipper Chapel.

The Personal Ordinariate of Our Lady of the Southern Cross developed an online resource, DailyOffice.online. This web app provides a digital version of Divine Worship: Daily Office (Commonwealth Edition) and includes all the materials needed to pray Morning Prayer and Evening Prayer according to the text of Divine Worship: Daily Office: Commonwealth Edition. The app is designed to make the Daily Office accessible to users anywhere. On the 1 December 2024, Apostolic Administrator Anthony Randazzo issued approval for its use in the Personal Ordinariate of Our Lady of the Southern Cross. His hope was that it would "serve as a source of profound spiritual enrichment for the faithful across our [OLSC] Ordinariate."

== See also ==
- Anglicanorum coetibus
- Anglican Service Book
