= Cathedral of Our Lady of Walsingham (Houston) =

Coordinates: 29.7960°N 95.4833°W

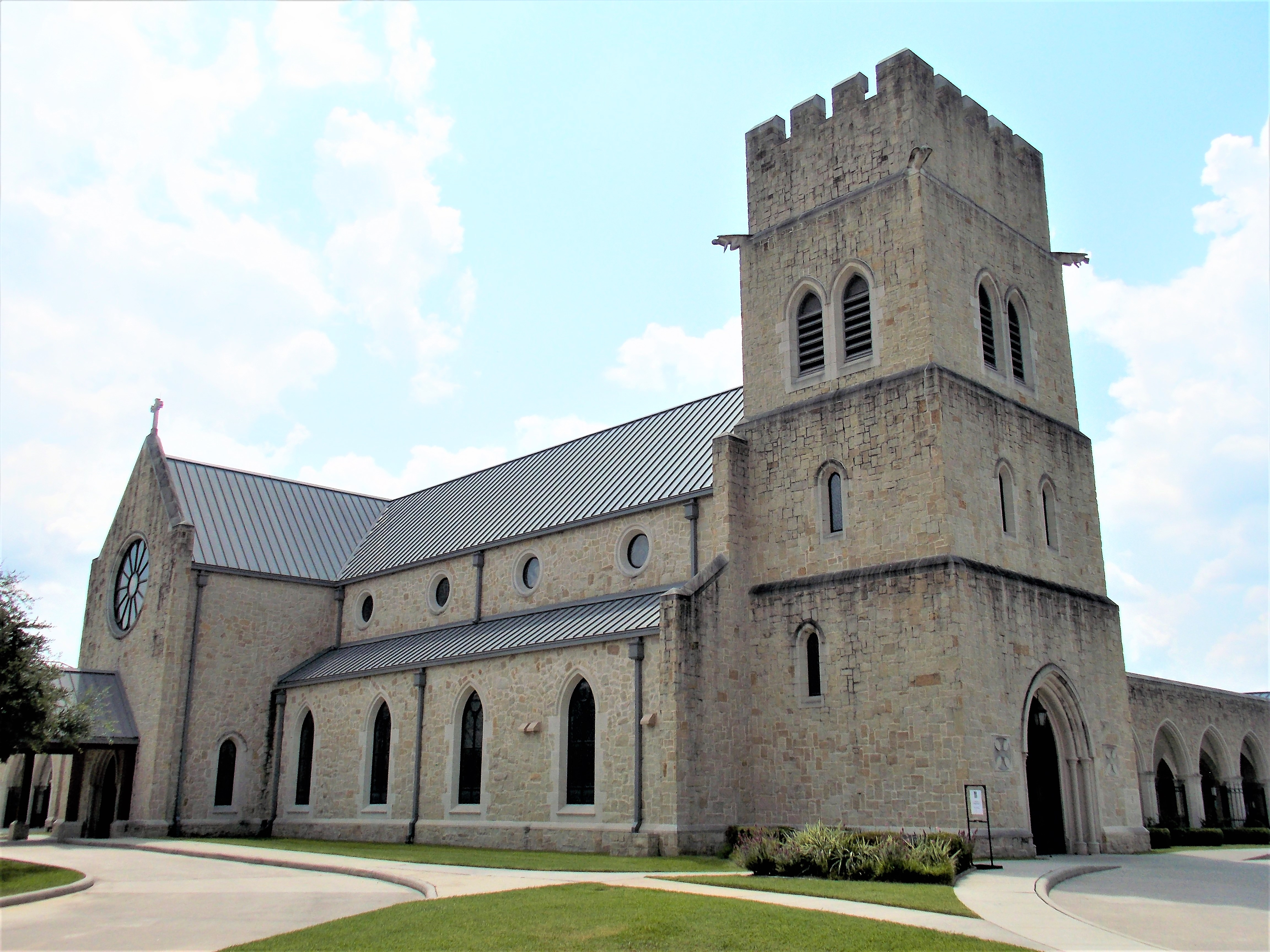
- Cathedral of Our Lady of Walsingham
- Location: Houston, Texas
- Country: United States
- Denomination: Catholic Church
- Churchmanship: Anglican Use
- Website: olwcatholic.org

History
- Former name: Our Lady Of Walsingham Catholic Church
- Status: Active
- Founder(s): James Moore and James Ramsey
- Dedication: Our Lady of Walsingham

Architecture
- Architectural type: Neo-Gothic
- Completed: 2003

Clergy
- Bishop: Steven J. Lopes
- Rector: Charles Hough, IV

The Cathedral of Our Lady of Walsingham in Houston, Texas, is a Catholic church that serves as the cathedral of the Personal Ordinariate of the Chair of Saint Peter.

The parish was originally founded in 1984, by clergy who had previously ministered in the Episcopal Church, as a parish under the Roman Catholic Archdiocese of Galveston–Houston. The parish operated in various locations before moving in 1992 to its current site, where the present church was completed in 2003. Upon the establishment of the Personal Ordinariate of the Chair of Saint Peter the church was transferred from the diocese to – and became the principal parish of – the ordinariate; it now serves as the ordinariate's cathedral.

The church features a distinctive architecture style reminiscent of Neo-Gothic style churches of an Anglican heritage and is the first parish in the United States dedicated to Our Lady of Walsingham. The Order of Mass is celebrated according to Divine Worship: The Missal.

== History ==
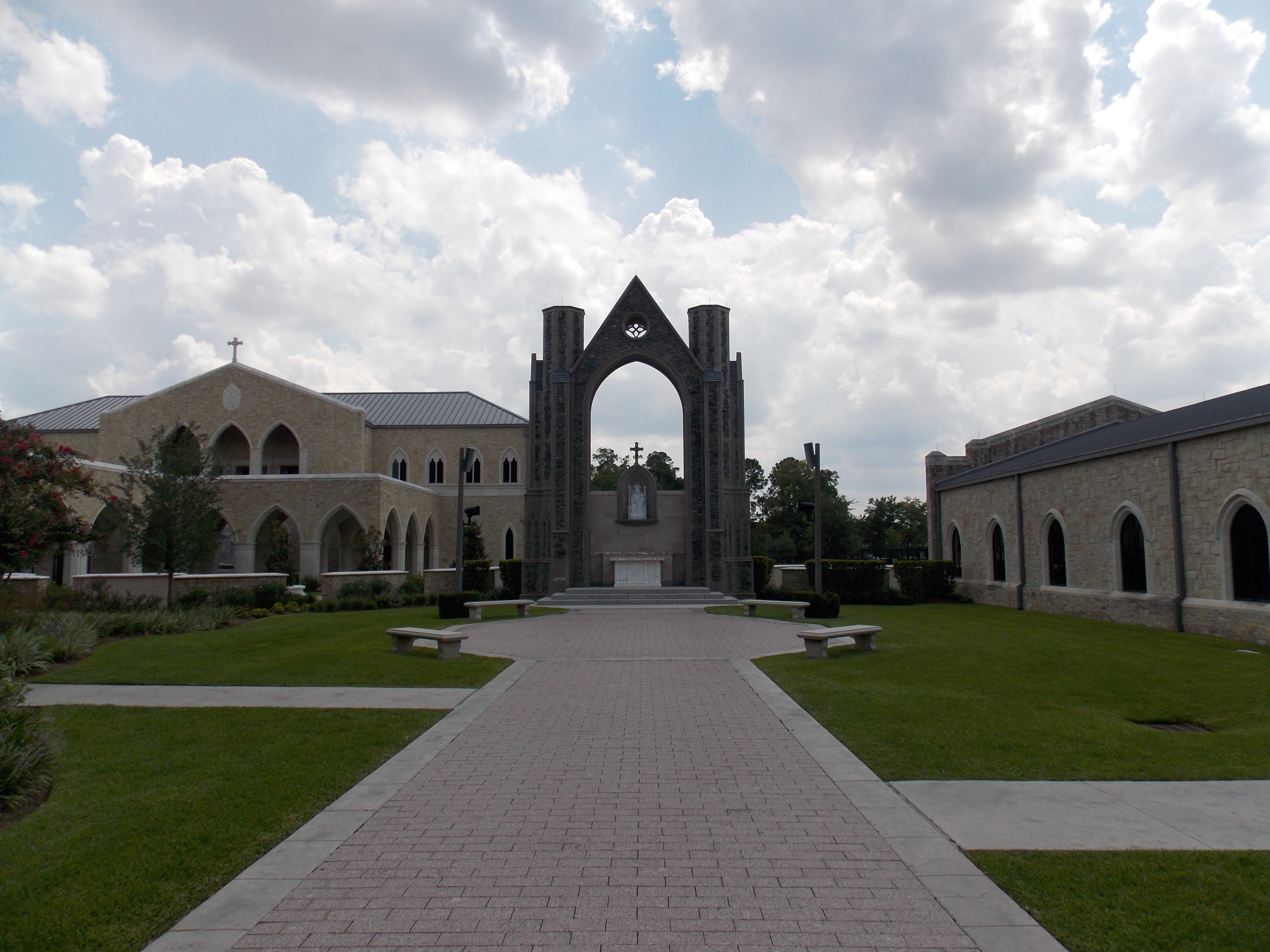
Chancery (left) and shrine of Our Lady of Walsingham

In 1980 Pope John Paul II established the Pastoral Provision that allowed Anglicans to enter into communion with the Catholic Church while retaining elements of their Anglican heritage. In 1982, James Moore and James Ramsey resigned their positions within the Episcopal Diocese of Texas to pursue a path into the Catholic Church.

During this period, Moore and Ramsey held small weekly community meetings under the title of Our Lady of Walsingham. Bishop John Louis Morkovsky allowed the community, although not yet formally part of the Catholic Church, to worship at a local church where they met weekly for worship. On April 7, 1984, Moore and Ramsey were ordained as priests in the Roman Catholic Church and were appointed as co-pastors of Our Lady of Walsingham Catholic Church.

The church moved several times during the following years until 1992 where it relocated to a small newly constructed church at the current location.

In 1999 a donation of $1m allowed the parish to begin planning building of a larger church. The new building was designed by Cram & Ferguson architects, and was consecrated in 2003, with the adjoining former church building becoming a church hall under the name St. Jude Hall.

The church site was further expanded with offices, a classroom building and an outdoor shrine, which were all consecrated in May 2011.

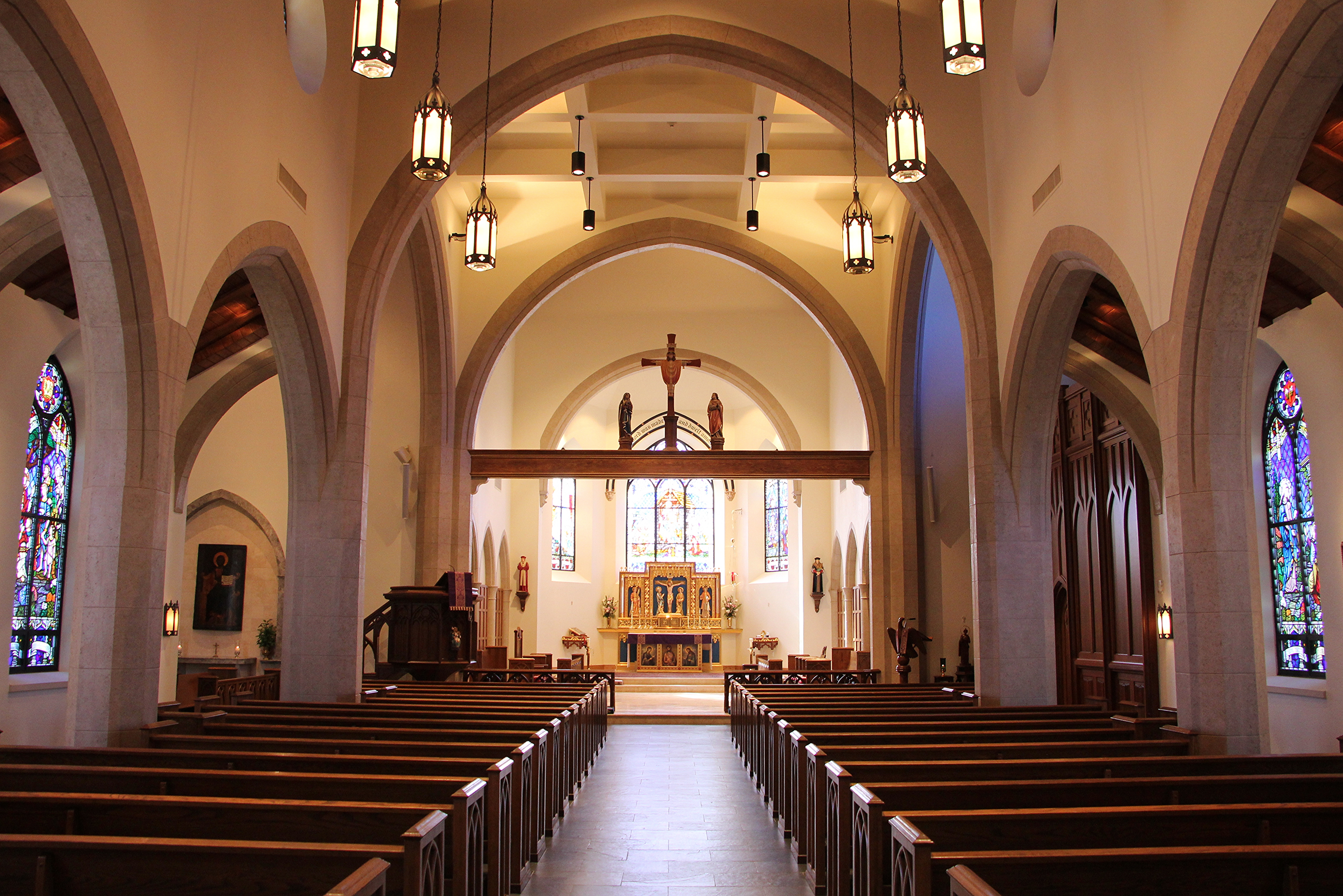
Cathedral interior

On January 1, 2012, with the establishment of the Personal Ordinariate of the Chair of St. Peter, Our Lady of Walsingham became the principal church of the ordinariate. In 2014, a chancery was erected on the church's grounds to manage the operations of the ordinariate. On February 2, 2016, Steven J. Lopes was ordained as the first bishop of the ordinariate, succeeding Jeffrey N. Steenson as ordinary. With the ordination of Bishop Lopes, Our Lady of Walsingham was elevated to the status of a cathedral.

In 2019, the Pope Benedict XVI House of Formation was erected for seminarians in formation for the priesthood in the Personal Ordinariate of the Chair of St. Peter, currently located across the street of the chancery.

In 2022, Cathedral High School welcomed its inaugural freshman class.

== Architecture ==
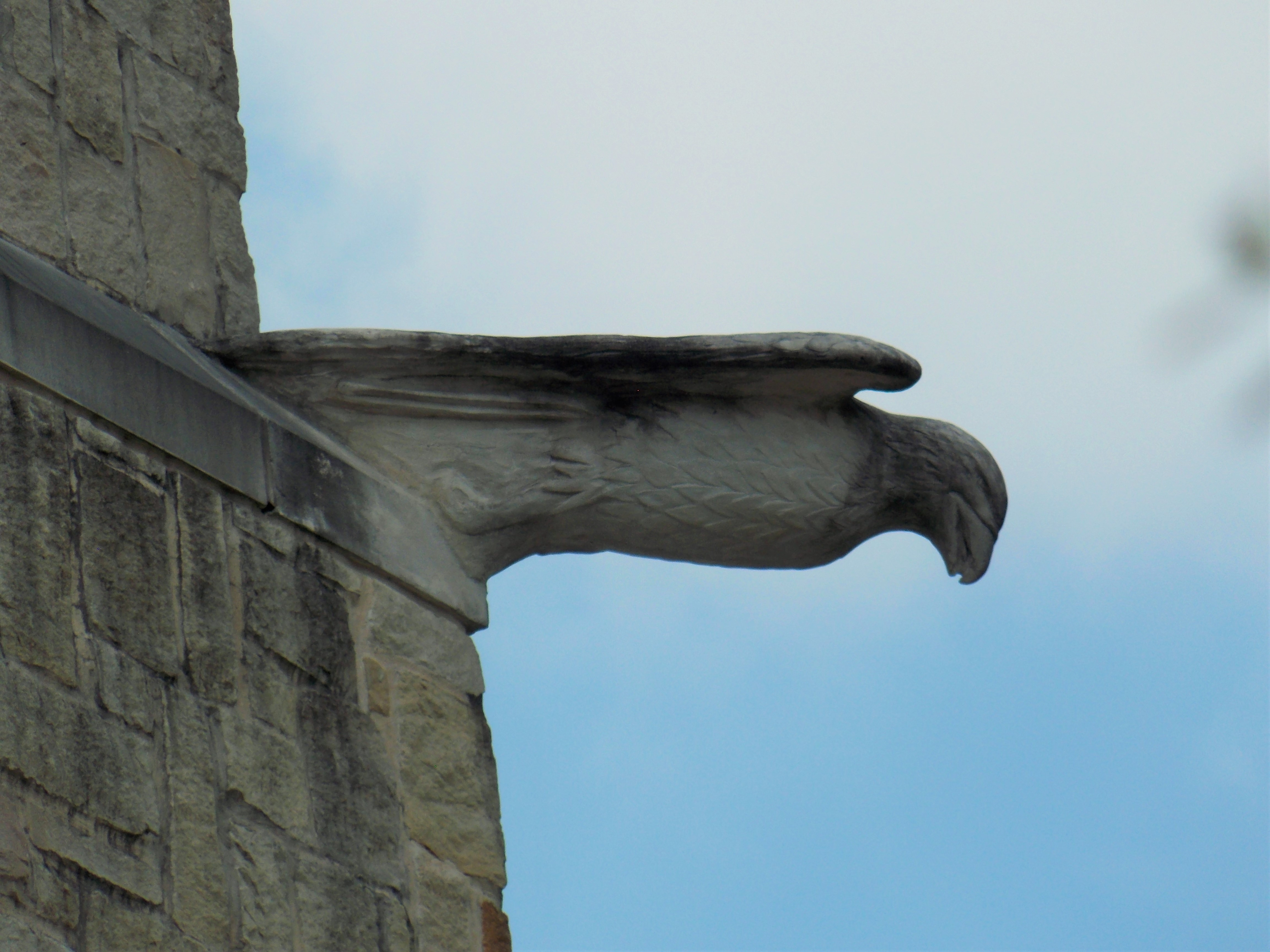
One of the gargoyles on the church tower

The church features distinctive Anglican heritage designs with limestone covering the exterior, inspired by 14th century styles of the Walsingham area of Norfolk, England. The interior of the church is Neo-Gothic with stained glass window, and wooden furnishings carved in Colombia. The church bells were cast in Normandy, France, and the reredos and tabernacle were hand-crafted in Spain.

The architecture expresses elements found in the Gothic-inspired buildings of the 12th to 16th centuries. These include pointed arches and sloping roofs in the church's exterior and shrine areas.

== Shrine ==
The church is under the patronage of Our Lady of Walsingham and holds one of the remaining fragments of the eastern window that was part of the original priory in Walsingham, England, dating back to the 12th century.

== Clergy ==
Before the implementation of Anglicanorum Coetibus in 2010, the parish was staffed chiefly by former Episcopalian clergy who were incardinated into the local Catholic diocese, one of whom was married but the rest were not. After 2010, a new parish rector (Charles Hough IV) was appointed. Several associate priests assist him in his duties, and the current clergy of the cathedral are all married with children of their own.
