= Carl Reid =

Australian priest

The Right Reverend Monsignor Carl Reid PA
- Ordinary of the Personal Ordinariate of Our Lady of the Southern Cross
- Church: Catholic Church
- Diocese: Our Lady of the Southern Cross
- Appointed: 26 March 2019
- Installed: 27 August 2019
- Term ended: 21 April 2023
- Predecessor: Harry Entwistle
- Successor: Anthony Randazzo

Orders
- Ordination: 1988 (deacon; Anglican); 1990 (priest; Anglican); 2007 (bishop; Anglican); 2013 (deacon; Catholic); 2013 (priest; Catholic) by Terrence Prendergast

Personal details
- Born: Carl Leonard Reid; 14 December 1950 (age 75) Hagersville, Ontario, Canada
- Denomination: Catholic prev. Anglican Catholic Church of Canada
- Residence: Sydney, Australia
- Education: Queen's University
- Motto: Lux Benigna Duce

Styles of Carl Reid
- Reference style: His Excellency; The Right Reverend
- Spoken style: Your Excellency
- Religious style: Monsignor

Carl Leonard Reid (born 14 December 1950) is a Canadian Roman Catholic priest, who was the ordinary of the Personal Ordinariate of Our Lady of the Southern Cross in Australia until 21 April 2023 when his resignation was accepted. He is a former bishop of the Anglican Catholic Church of Canada, a Continuing Anglican church within the Traditional Anglican Communion; he was received into the Catholic Church in 2012 and was ordained a priest of the Personal Ordinariate of the Chair of Saint Peter in 2013.

== Early life and education ==
Reid was born on 14 December 1950 in Hagersville, Ontario, Canada. He was baptised on 14 January 1951 in the Anglican Church of Canada, a province of the Anglican Communion. He studied geological engineering at Queen's University in Kingston, Ontario, graduating in 1973.

== Ordained ministry ==
=== Anglican ministry ===
Reid was a member of the Traditional Anglican Communion. On 27 January 2007, along with Craig Botterill, he was consecrated bishop by the primate, John Hepworth, assisted by Peter Wilkinson and Robert Mercer. This made him a suffragan bishop of the Anglican Catholic Church of Canada and in charge of the province of Ottawa.

=== Roman Catholic Church ===
In 2009, Pope Benedict XVI promulgated the apostolic constitution Anglicanorum coetibus. In November 2011, Reid became assistant bishop of the Anglican Catholic Church of Canada's pro-diocese of Our Lady of Walsingham, composed of clergy and parishes which were preparing for entry into the future Personal Ordinariate of the Chair of Saint Peter.

Reid was received into the Roman Catholic Church on 15 April 2012. He was received along with Peter Wilkinson and received communion for the first time as a Roman Catholic at a Mass presided by Monsignor Richard Gagnon at St Andrew's Cathedral in Victoria, British Columbia. The Pope allowed some married former Anglican priests to be ordained as Roman Catholic priests, and Reid was ordained for the Personal Ordinariate of the Chair of Saint Peter as a deacon on 12 January 2013 and as a priest on 26 January 2013 by Archbishop Terrence Prendergast at Notre Dame Cathedral in Ottawa.

Reid became dean of Saint John the Baptist Church and rector of the Congregation of the Annunciation of the Blessed Virgin Mary. In 2014, he was appointed rector of the Congregation of Blessed John Henry Newman Church, now Saint John Henry Newman, in Victoria.

On 26 March 2019, Pope Francis appointed Reid as the ordinary of the Personal Ordinariate of Our Lady of the Southern Cross in Australia and Japan, in succession to Harry Entwistle. As he is married, he could not become a bishop. His installation was on 27 August 2019 at St Mary's Cathedral, Sydney, by Anthony Fisher, Archbishop of Sydney. In 2022, the ordinariate underwent an apostolic visitation. On 21 April 2023, the Holy See announced that the pope had accepted Reid's resignation (at the age of 72) effective 1 July. Bishop Anthony Randazzo was appointed to succeed him, becoming the ordinariate's apostolic administrator in July 2023.

Catholic Church titles
Preceded by Harry Entwistle	Ordinary of the Personal Ordinariate of Our Lady of the Southern Cross; 2019–2023	Succeeded by Anthony Randazzo as Apostolic Administrator
