= Anglican Use =

Roman Rite liturgical use of former Anglicans in the Catholic Church

The Canterbury Cross, a variation of which was adopted as its logo by the Anglican Use Society, which later changed its name to Anglicanorum Coetibus Society

The Anglican Use, also known as Divine Worship, is a use of the Roman Rite celebrated by the personal ordinariates, originally created for former Anglicans who converted to Catholicism while wishing to maintain "aspects of the Anglican patrimony that are of particular value" and includes former Methodist converts to Catholicism who wish to retain aspects of Anglican and Methodist heritage, liturgy, and tradition. Its most common occurrence is within parishes of the personal ordinariates which were erected in 2009. Upon the promulgation of Divine Worship: The Missal, the term "Anglican Use" was replaced by "Divine Worship" in the liturgical books and complementary norms, though "Anglican Use" is still used to describe these liturgies as they existed from the papacy of John Paul II to present.

== Definition ==
The Anglican Use was originally "the liturgy of The Book of Divine Worship [...] formulated and authorized in response to Pope John Paul II's 1980 Pastoral Provision that allowed Episcopalian priests and laity in the United States to join the Catholic church while preserving elements proper to their Anglican tradition." It gives the name "Ordinariate Use" to the liturgy, since December 2015, of the personal ordinariates for former Anglicans, which is that contained in Divine Worship: The Missal and Divine Worship: Occasional Services. At a time when a specific liturgy for the personal ordinariates was still under preparation, the Anglican Use community in Indianapolis applied the term "Anglican Use" to the Book of Divine Worship liturgy that was then the interim liturgy of the North American personal ordinariate. The Pasadena parish calls the present form "the Ordinariate Form" and adds that it is unofficially but popularly known as the "Anglican Use". The American National Catholic Register has also distinguished between Anglican Use and Ordinariate Use. Other sources and commentators apply the term Anglican Use to all the books known by the Divine Worship appellation.

== History ==
=== Origins ===
In 1977, some of those Anglicans and Episcopalians who desired union with the Catholic Church contacted individual Catholic bishops, the Apostolic Delegate to the United States (Archbishop Jean Jadot) and the Congregation for the Doctrine of the Faith in Rome, to inquire about the possibility for married Anglican priests to be received into the Catholic Church and function as Catholic priests.

After the United States National Conference of Catholic Bishops and the Congregation for the Doctrine of the Faith had reacted favorably to the proposals that had been put before them, a formal request for union was presented in Rome on 3 November 1979 for acceptance into the Catholic Church, for steps to be taken to eliminate any defects that might be found in their priestly orders, and that they be granted the oversight, direction, and governance of a Catholic bishop.

=== Pastoral Provision ===
The decision of the Holy See was officially communicated in a letter of 22 July 1980 from the Congregation for the Doctrine of the Faith to the president of the United States episcopal conference, who published it on 20 August 1980. Though admittance of the Episcopalians in question to the Catholic Church was considered as reconciliation of individuals, the pastoral provision gave them a common group identity. After a period of being subject to the local Latin Church bishop, the bishop could set up personal parishes for them, with the use, within the group, of a form of liturgy that retained certain elements of the Anglican liturgy; and married Episcopalian priests could on a case-by-case basis be ordained as Catholic priests, but not as bishops.

In 1983, the first Anglican Use parish, Our Lady of the Atonement, was established in San Antonio, Texas. Our Lady of Walsingham parish in Houston, Texas, followed the next year.

=== Personal ordinariates ===
On 9 December 2009, Pope Benedict XVI issued the Apostolic Constitution Anglicanorum coetibus, authorizing the establishment of personal ordinariates for former Anglicans. The first to be established was the Personal Ordinariate of Our Lady of Walsingham for England and Wales in January 2011, followed by the Personal Ordinariate of the Chair of Saint Peter for the United States in January 2012 and the Personal Ordinariate of Our Lady of the Southern Cross for Australia in June 2012. These "Anglican Use ordinariates" were a response to Anglicans outside the United States, and hence beyond the remit of the Pastoral Provision, but they also supplied some of the perceived needs of that previous provision.

Canonical differences between the Anglican Use parishes and the personal ordinariate are outlined in a study published in the 23 January 2012 issue of the National Catholic Reporter.

== Anglican Use liturgy ==
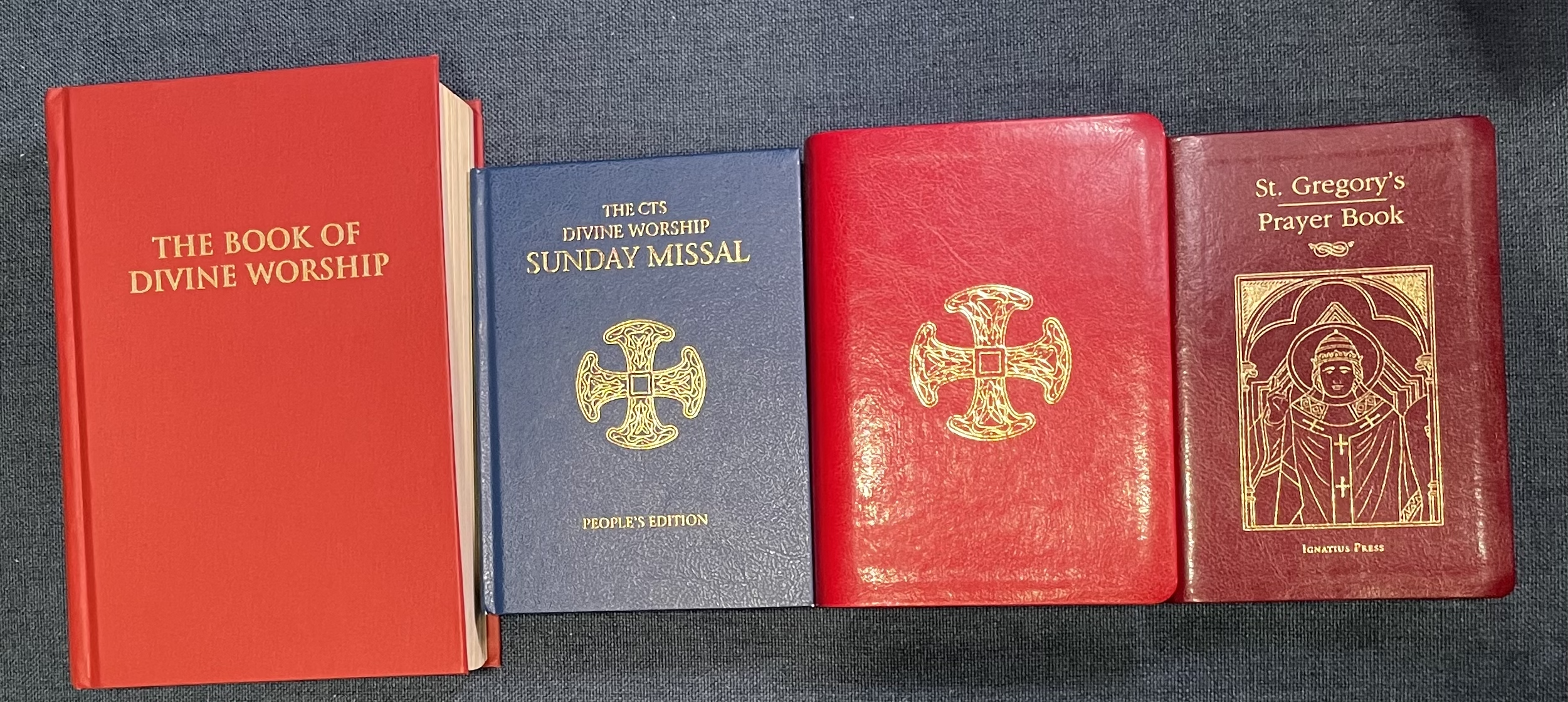
Several Anglican Use liturgical and devotional texts of the Catholic Church

=== Initial ===
==== Book of Divine Worship ====
The Congregation for Divine Worship gave provisional approval for the Anglican Use liturgy, the Book of Divine Worship, in 1984, an approval rendered definitive in 1987. This book incorporates elements of the 1928 American Book of Common Prayer, but the Eucharistic liturgy is from the 1979 prayer book, with the eucharistic prayers taken from the Roman Missal and the ancient Sarum Rite (with the modern English Words of Institution inserted in the latter). New texts were promulgated by the congregation on 22 June 2012, the feast of English saints Thomas More and John Fisher, namely the Order for Funerals and the Order for the Celebration of Holy Matrimony.

The Book of Divine Worship was based closely on the United States Episcopal Church liturgy, which had developed in ways different from that of Anglican churches in England and Australia, making it unsuitable for imposing on all personal ordinariates for former Anglicans. Its Order of Mass drew elements also from the original Book of Common Prayer, from different later versions of it, from the Tridentine Mass and from the Roman Rite as revised after the Second Vatican Council. The Holy See's 'Anglicanae Traditiones Commission' that developed the updated form of Anglican patrimonial liturgy used the Book of Divine Worship as its "lead" source.

==== Customary ====
As an interim Divine Office, the Personal Ordinariate of Our Lady of Walsingham in 2012 adopted the Customary of Our Lady of Walsingham. Combining elements from the most common Roman Rite books of hours–the Liturgia Horarum and the Breviarium Romanum–and both the 1549 and 1662 editions of the Church of England Book of Common Prayer, the Customary contained the full psalter. It also contained Terce, Sext, and None–hours present in the Roman Rite but not in most Anglican prayer books.

=== Current ===
==== Divine Worship: the Missal ====
Divine Worship: The Missal is the current missal containing the complete expression of the Divine Worship Eucharistic liturgy for use in all three personal ordinariates for former Anglicans that had been established from 2011. It took effect on 29 November 2015. The Mass is a "use" of the Roman Rite requiring the Roman Canon on Sundays, augmented with Anglican features such as wording, the Prayer of Humble Access and the "Comfortable Words". A number of these extra or optional features have equivalents in the Tridentine use, notably in the propers, the prayers at the foot of the altar, the offertory prayers and the Last Gospel.

In the new liturgical books for the personal ordinariates, the Congregation for the Doctrine of the Faith and the Congregation for Divine Worship retained the generic title Divine Worship for the entire liturgical provision for the personal ordinariates, dropping the "Book of" naming convention in favor of Divine Worship: The Missal.

The earlier Book of Divine Worship has been phased out and is no longer authorized for use in public worship. The term "Anglican Use" has been replaced by "Divine Worship" in the liturgical books and complementary norms.

==== Divine Worship: Daily Office ====
Divine Worship: Daily Office is the Divine Office approved for Anglican Use Ordinariates. There are two editions: The North American Edition, printed by Newman House Press and released in late 2020, is used in the Personal Ordinariate of the Chair of Saint Peter in the United States and Canada. The Commonwealth Edition, printed by the Catholic Truth Society, is used in the Personal Ordinariates of Our Lady of Walsingham and Our Lady of the Southern Cross in the United Kingdom, Ireland, Australia, Japan, and Oceania.

=== Divine Worship: Occasional Services ===
Divine Worship: Occasional Services is the text approved for Anglican Use Ordinariates that contains provisions for celebration of the Holy Baptism (adult and infant), Confirmation for adults, Holy Matrimony and the Order of Funerals.

== See also ==
- List of Anglican bishops who converted to Roman Catholicism
- Sacerdotalis caelibatus
- Unitatis redintegratio
- Western Rite Orthodoxy
