= Harry Entwistle =

Australian priest

The Right Reverend, Monsignor Harry Entwistle PA
- Ordinary of the Personal Ordinariate of Our Lady of the Southern Cross
- Church: Roman Catholic Church
- Appointed: 15 June 2012
- Term ended: 27 March 2019
- Predecessor: new post
- Successor: Carl Reid
- Other posts: Western Regional Bishop (ACCA), (2006–2012)

Orders
- Ordination: 20 September 1964 (C of E); 15 June 2012 (RCC) by Timothy Costelloe (Catholic)
- Consecration: 24 November 2006 (ACCA)

Personal details
- Born: 31 May 1940 (age 86) Chorley, Lancashire, England
- Denomination: Roman Catholic (formerly Anglican)
- Education: St Chad's Theological College
- Motto: Par ce signe "By this sign"
- Coat of arms

Styles of Harry Entwistle
- Reference style: His Excellency; The Right Reverend
- Spoken style: Your Excellency
- Religious style: Monsignor

Harry Entwistle (born 31 May 1940) is an English-born Australian priest of the Catholic Church who was the first ordinary of the Personal Ordinariate of Our Lady of the Southern Cross (2012–2019).

== Early life ==
Entwistle was born on 31 May 1940. He studied theology for ordination at St Chad's Theological College, University of Durham.

== Ordained ministry ==
=== Anglican ===
Entwistle was ordained a priest in the Church of England Diocese of Blackburn in 1964. After various parish appointments in Lancashire, he became a prison chaplain, serving at HMP Wandsworth from 1981 to 1988. He migrated to Australia in 1988 and continued his parish and prison ministry in the Diocese of Perth of the Anglican Church of Australia. He entered the Anglican Catholic Church in Australia, a member church of the Traditional Anglican Communion, in 2006. He served as the Western Regional Bishop of that church from 2006 to 2012.

=== Roman Catholic ===
After reception into the Roman Catholic Church and ordination as a deacon, Entwistle was ordained to the priesthood at St Mary's Cathedral, Perth, on 15 June 2012 by Bishop Timothy Costelloe. On the same day he was appointed Ordinary of the Personal Ordinariate of Our Lady of the Southern Cross. Entwistle was granted the title of Monsignor by Pope Benedict XVI in one of his last acts before retirement.

Catholic Church titles
New title	Ordinary of the Personal Ordinariate of Our Lady of the Southern Cross; 2012–2019	Succeeded by Carl Reid
