= The Traditional Anglican Church in Australia =

- Coat of arms
- Classification: Continuing Anglican
- Orientation: Anglo-Catholic
- Polity: Episcopal
- Bishop: Brian Tee
- Associations: Traditional Anglican Church
- Region: Australia, New Zealand, Japan
- Separated from: Anglican Church of Australia
- Official website: traditionalanglican.org.au

The Traditional Anglican Church in Australia (TACA), formerly named the Anglican Catholic Church in Australia (ACCA), is the regional jurisdiction of the Traditional Anglican Church for Australia, New Zealand and Japan. The Traditional Anglican Church in Australia is not affiliated with the Missionary Diocese of Australia & New Zealand of the Anglican Catholic Church (Original Province).

== History ==
The Traditional Anglican Church in Australia originated from the Anglican Catholic Church of Australia, which was formed in 1987 with Albert Haley of Brisbane, Queensland, who resigned as rector of All Saints' Wickham Terrace, a parish of the Anglican Church of Australia. The Rt Revd William Rutherford was the first Continuing Anglican bishop to visit Australia, having been welcomed by Bishop John Hazlewood. In early 1986, Bishop Hazlewood, along with the Bishop of London, Graham Leonard, participated in a national gathering of Continuing Anglican leaders in the United States. Albert Haley was consecrated bishop in 1988 by Alfred Woolcock of the Anglican Catholic Church of Canada, assisted by Louis Falk, Robert Crawley, Robert Mercer and Bruce Stewart Chamberlain. When the Traditional Anglican Communion (TAC) was formed in 1991 the Anglican Catholic Church in Australia (ACCA) joined as a constituent church.

On 29 June 1996, John Hepworth was consecrated as a bishop, together with Robert John Friend, at the Pro-Cathedral of the Resurrection, Brisbane, by bishops Albert Haley (then diocesan bishop of the ACCA), Robert C. Crawley (Anglican Catholic Church of Canada), Wellborn Hudson (Anglican Church in America) and John Hazlewood (retired Bishop of Ballarat in the Anglican Church of Australia). Hepworth served as an assistant bishop until April 1998 when Bishop Friend (who had succeeded Haley as diocesan) resigned. From then until November 1999, Hepworth acted as bishop administrator. At the national synod of the ACCA, held from 25 to 29 November 1999, he was elected as the new diocesan bishop. In 2002 he was elected as primate of the Traditional Anglican Communion (TAC) in succession to Louis Falk.

Under the leadership of Archbishop Hepworth as primate, attempts were made to bring the TAC and Forward in Faith into closer alignment. In 2005, two Anglican Communion priests, David Chislett from Australia and David Moyer from America, were controversially consecrated as bishops in the United States by Hepworth and Ross Davies (the then Bishop of The Murray in the Anglican Church of Australia) to provide "orthodox" and Anglo-Catholic oversight in parishes belonging to the Episcopal Church in the US and the Anglican Church of Australia. This was done without the approval of the Anglican Church of Australia.

In February 2010, the Anglican Catholic Church in Australia, along with Forward in Faith Australia, filed a petition to the Roman Catholic Church's Congregation for the Doctrine of the Faith at the Vatican to join the Roman Catholic Church as a personal ordinariate under the apostolic constitution Anglicanorum Coetibus. The Church of Torres Strait (a diocese in Queensland) submitted a similar but separate proposal in May 2010. Some priests of the ACCA have since joined the Personal Ordinariate of Our Lady of the Southern Cross, along with some of their people. Despite the corporate petitions to Rome, Anglicanorum Coetibus did not make any provisions for the reception of entire ecclesial bodies.

In 2012, the TAC college of bishops met and formally accepted the resignation of Hepworth. Hepworth was officially expelled from the TAC college of bishops on 10 October 2012.

Some clergy and parishes remained in the ACCA and on 18 October 2013 (the 25th anniversary of the consecration of Albert Haley, the first bishop ordinary of the ACCA) a new bishop ordinary, Michael Pope, was consecrated for the ACCA in Lincoln, England, in the same ceremony in which Ian Gray was consecrated for the Traditional Anglican Church in Britain. The chief consecrators of Bishop Pope were Archbishop Prakash with Bishop David Robarts and Bishop¨Craig Botterill.

After the reorganisation of the Traditional Anglican Communion to become the Traditional Anglican Church, the Anglican Catholic Church in Australia was renamed as the Traditional Anglican Church in Australia in 2024.

== Leadership ==
The previous bishop ordinary was the Rt Revd David Robarts, who was consecrated a bishop in the Traditional Anglican Communion in 2006. Robarts had been the episcopal visitor of the church for many years, and was enthroned as bishop of the Anglican Catholic Church in Australia in 2016. Robarts died on 2 October 2024.

Brian Tee, previously the vicar general, was consecrated as bishop of the church on 22 May 2025.
