= Divine Worship: The Missal =

Current Anglican Use Missal of the Catholic Church

- Author: Personal ordinariates established by Anglicanorum coetibus
- Language: English
- Publisher: Catholic Truth Society
- Publication date: 2015
- Publication place: United Kingdom
- Media type: Print
- Pages: 1086
- ISBN: 978-1-78469-020-5
- Website: https://www.ctsbooks.org/product/divine-worship-the-ordinariate-missal

Divine Worship: The Missal (DW:TM) is the liturgical book containing the instructions and texts for the celebration of Mass by the former Anglicans within the Catholic Church in the three personal ordinariates of Great Britain, United States and Canada, and Australia. The rite contained in this missal is the Anglican Use, a liturgical use of the Roman Rite Mass with elements of Anglican worship. It was approved for use beginning on the first Sunday of Advent, November 29, 2015.

== History ==
The apostolic constitution Anglicanorum coetibus issued by Pope Benedict XVI on 4 November 2009 expanded this concept and led to the creation of three personal ordinariates: one in England, Scotland and Wales, one in the United States and Canada, and one in Australia.

Anglicanorum coetibus specifically authorized the creation of liturgical forms for the personal ordinariate through a new missal called Divine Worship: The Missal, which gives expression to and preserves for Catholic worship the Anglican liturgical tradition and patrimony, understood as that which has nourished the Catholic faith throughout the history of the Anglican tradition and prompted aspirations towards ecclesial unity.

Divine Worship: The Missal was developed by the interdicasterial commission Anglicanae Traditiones of the Congregation for the Doctrine of the Faith and the Congregation for Divine Worship and the Discipline of the Sacraments to be the liturgy for all Ordinariate parishes worldwide. All three ordinariates—the Personal Ordinariates of Our Lady of Walsingham, the Chair of Saint Peter, and Our Lady of the Southern Cross adopted the missal. Advisers to the commission included Archbishop Joseph Augustine Di Noia, Msgr. Steven J. Lopes, Msgr. Andrew Burnham, Bishop Peter J. Elliott, Archbishop Salvatore J. Cordileone, Fr. Uwe Michael Lang, Hans-Jürgen Feulner, Clinton A. Brand, Fr. Andrew Menke, and Msgr. Peter Wilkinson.

== Contents ==
Divine Worship: The Missal opens with the decree of the Congregation for Divine Worship and the Discipline of the Sacraments authorizing the publication of the missal. These are followed by proclamations from the Ordinaries of each of the three Personal Ordinariates specifically authorizing its use. It then contains a complete copy of The General Instruction of the Roman Missal (GIRM) and the Divine Worship Rubrical Directory, which provides instructions on how the Divine Worship Liturgy differs from the Roman Rite (of which it is an expression).

The Calendar of the Church Year used in the Personal Ordinariates comes next, followed by the propers for the portions of the Church Year including Advent, Epiphany, Pre-Lent, Lent, Passiontide, Holy Week, Eastertide, Trinitytide, and Feasts of the Lord. The Order of Mass appears at this point, followed by the Propers of Saints and Holy Days, the Commons for various purposes, several appendices, and prayers for before and after Mass.

== Mass ==
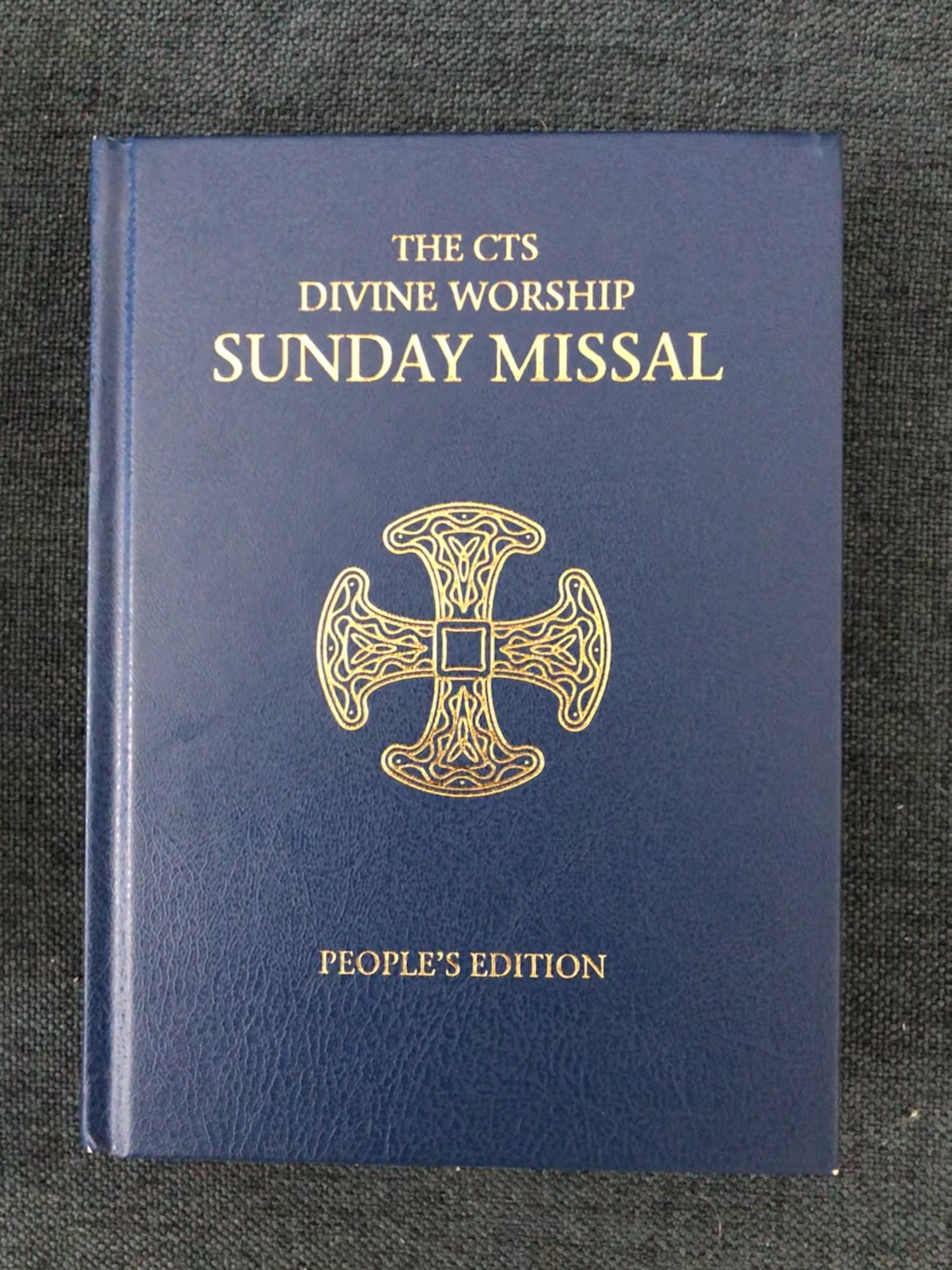
Divine Worship Sunday Missal for lay use.

For each Mass, the Proper of the Mass includes the appointed Introit, Collect, Gradual, Alleluia or Tract, Offertory, and Communion. The Epistle and Gospel readings for Sunday are to be taken from the Revised Roman Missal, using the Revised Standard Version Second Catholic Edition translation. Divine Worship: The Missal preserves such features and elements that are representative of the historic Anglican Books of Common Prayer and Anglican missals, in conformity with Catholic doctrinal and liturgical norms, and is therefore at once distinctively and traditionally Anglican in character, linguistic register, and structure, while also being clearly and recognizably an expression of the Roman Rite.

In 2020, a revised edition of Divine Worship: The Missal was released, containing the propers for St. John Henry Newman, whose canonization in November 2019 was celebrated by the ordinariates.

== Use ==
Public liturgical celebration according to Divine Worship is restricted to the personal ordinariates established under the apostolic constitution Anglicanorum coetibus, definitively making it a particular use–rather than a form–of the Roman Rite. Any priest incardinated in these ordinariates may also celebrate the Mass according to Divine Worship outside the parishes of the ordinariate when celebrating Mass without a congregation, or publicly with the permission of the rector or pastor of the corresponding church or parish.

In cases of pastoral necessity or in the absence of a priest incardinated in an ordinariate, any priest incardinated in a diocese or in an institute of consecrated life or society of apostolic life may celebrate the Holy Sacrifice of the Mass according to Divine Worship for members of the ordinariate who request it. Any priest incardinated in a diocese or in an institute of consecrated life or society of apostolic life may concelebrate Mass according to Divine Worship.

== See also ==
- Anglican Use
- Daily Office
- Book of Common Prayer
- Anglican chant
