= Book of Divine Worship =

Booking adapting Anglican worship for Catholic use

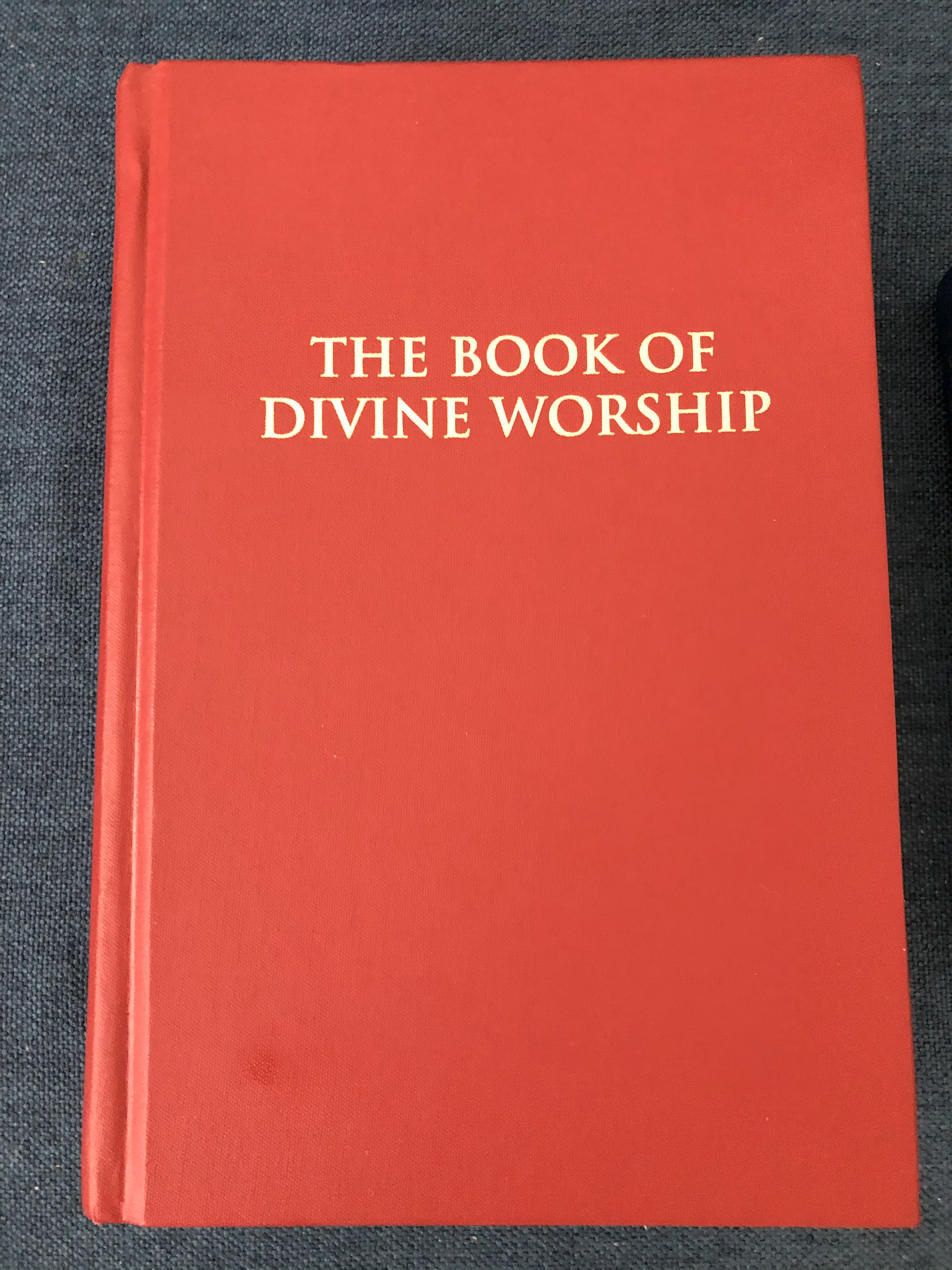
A print edition of The Book of Divine Worship, an adaption of the Book of Common Prayer approved for Catholic use, as published in 2003.

The Book of Divine Worship (BDW) is an adaptation of the American Book of Common Prayer (BCP) by the Catholic Church. It was used primarily by former members of the Episcopal Church within Anglican Use parishes of the Pastoral Provision and the Personal Ordinariates. It has been replaced by a new book to be used worldwide, titled Divine Worship: The Missal.

== History ==
Along with the ordination of married former Episcopal priests, the Pastoral Provision of 1980 permitted the establishment of Anglican Use parishes in the United States and created a special missal using liturgical elements from the Anglican tradition.

== End-of-life ==
The Book of Divine Worship was seen as US-centric and was not used in parishes of the Personal Ordinariates outside the US, but was instrumental in the joint development of a new liturgy by the Interdicasterial Commission Anglicanae Traditiones of the Congregation for the Doctrine of the Faith and the Congregation for Divine Worship and the Discipline of the Sacraments to be the traditional language liturgy for all Ordinariate parishes worldwide as called for by the apostolic constitution Anglicanorum Coetibus of 4 November 2009.

In 2015, Divine Worship: The Missal was published. The Book of Divine Worship ceased to be used at the start of Advent that same year.
