= Personal ordinariate =

Canonical structure within the Catholic Church

A personal ordinariate for former Anglicans, shortened as personal ordinariate or Anglican ordinariate, is a canonical structure within the Catholic Church established in order to enable "groups of Anglicans" and Methodists to join the Catholic Church while preserving elements of their liturgical and spiritual patrimony.

Created in accordance with the apostolic constitution Anglicanorum coetibus of 4 November 2009 and its complementary norms, the ordinariates are juridically equivalent to a diocese, "a particular church in which and from which exists the one and unique Catholic Church", but may be erected in the same territory as other dioceses "by reason of the rite of the faithful or some similar reason".

Three personal ordinariates were established between 2011 and 2012:

- Personal Ordinariate of Our Lady of Walsingham (England and Wales, Scotland)
- Personal Ordinariate of the Chair of Saint Peter (United States, Canada)
- Personal Ordinariate of Our Lady of the Southern Cross (Australia, Japan)

== Name ==
"Personal ordinariate" is the term used for each of the three existing ordinariates in the decree that established them: the Personal Ordinariate of Our Lady of Walsingham, the Personal Ordinariate of the Chair of Saint Peter and the Personal Ordinariate of Our Lady of the Southern Cross. It is also the collective name given to all three in the official yearbook of the Holy See and is a name the ordinariates themselves use.

"Ordinariates for former Anglicans" is a term sometimes used by the ordinariates themselves, by news sources (but not official documents) of the Holy See and episcopal conferences. This terminology, however, does not mean that an ordinariate's membership exclusively comprises former Anglicans. The head of the North American ordinariate has said that "ordinariates for former Anglicans must be a bridge to Christian unity and a force for true ecumenism" and the members must "build and rebuild our relationships with confreres who have stayed behind in the Anglican Church".

"Anglican ordinariates" is often used by newspapers, such as the Church of England Newspaper and the Canadian Catholic Register. It is also often used by communities belonging to the ordinariates. The name does not imply that the members of an ordinariate are still Anglicans. While those who have been Anglicans "bring with them, into the full communion of the Catholic Church in all its diversity and richness of liturgical rites and traditions, aspects of their own Anglican patrimony and culture which are consonant with the Catholic Faith", they are members of the Latin Church exclusively in communion with the Catholic Church and no other bodies.

== History ==
=== Background ===
The apostolic constitution was a response by the Holy See to requests coming from Continuing Anglican churches, particularly the Traditional Anglican Communion; and from Anglo-Catholic sections of the Anglican Communion, such as those involved with Forward in Faith, and, within the Catholic Church, from the Anglican Use parishes which have existed since the early 1980s when, at the request of the United States Conference of Catholic Bishops, Pope John Paul II granted the Pastoral Provision allowing the creation, within the territorial Latin Church dioceses of the United States, of parishes in which the liturgy would be celebrated in an approved form of the Anglican tradition and with a married clergy composed of former Anglican priests who were ordained in the Catholic Church on joining it. Many of these Anglican Use Catholics had left the Episcopal Church because of women's ordination especially to the episcopate, revisions of the liturgy, and changes in its moral teaching. These changes evidenced also in the consecration of a partnered homosexual man as a bishop and the blessing of same-sex couples have provoked serious tensions within the composite Anglican world, as Cardinal Walter Kasper said in 2009, leading to the requests to which the apostolic constitution was a response. The discussions that led to the granting of the 1980 pastoral provision raised some of the ideas that came to fruition in the decision of 2009. One was the setting up of a structure for former Anglicans similar to the military ordinariate, an idea that was not then acted on because of the small number of Anglicans involved at that time.

In October 2007 the Traditional Anglican Communion presented to the Holy See a petition for full union in corporate form (i.e., as a body, not merely as individuals) with the Catholic Church. This worldwide grouping, under a single primate, of churches of Anglican tradition but outside communion with the see of Canterbury, was founded in 1991. It was formed over a number of issues, including liturgical revisions, the ordination of women and open homosexuals as priests, the sanctioning of homosexuality and the importance of tradition.

On 5 July 2008, Cardinal William Levada, prefect of the Congregation for the Doctrine of the Faith (CDF), responded to the formal request for "full, corporate and sacramental union" with the Catholic Church giving written assurance that the CDF was giving serious attention to the prospect of "corporate unity" raised in that request. The request thus became a basis for the decision, announced by Levada on 20 October 2009, to issue the apostolic constitution.

=== Announcement and enactment ===
The decision to institute personal ordinariates for Anglicans who join the Catholic Church was announced on 20 October 2009 in simultaneous press conferences by the prefect of the Congregation for the Doctrine of the Faith, William Levada in Rome and by the Archbishop of Canterbury, Rowan Williams, and the Archbishop of Westminster, Vincent Nichols, in London.

The apostolic constitution enacting the introduction of personal ordinariates for former Anglicans was released on 9 November 2009, together with supplementary norms for the ordinariates, allowing former Anglicans to enter full communion with the Catholic Church while preserving elements of the distinctive Anglican spiritual and liturgical patrimony. Provision was made for ordination as Catholic priests of married former Anglican clergy, but for historical and ecumenical reasons married men could not be ordained as bishops. The ordinary, who will usually be appointed from among former Anglican clergy, can therefore be either a priest or a bishop. Seminarians in the ordinariate were to be prepared alongside other Catholic seminarians, though the ordinariate might establish a house of formation to address the particular needs of formation in the Anglican patrimony.

In December 2009, Levada responded to each of the bishops of the Traditional Anglican Communion who signed the October 2007 petition for corporate union with the Catholic Church, stating that the Congregation for the Doctrine of the Faith had completed its long and detailed study with the aim of making available a suitable and viable model of organic unity for their group "and other such groups". The Traditional Anglican Communion then undertook discussions with those other groups and with representatives of the Catholic episcopal conferences and planned to give a formal response after a meeting of their bishops in Eastertide 2010.

=== Acceptance by some Anglican groups ===
A number of Anglican groups soon petitioned the Congregation for the Doctrine of the Faith for acceptance into ordinariates.

- On 3 March 2010, in Orlando, Florida, the eight members of the House of Bishops of the Anglican Church in America voted unanimously to become part of the Catholic Church along with 3,000 fellow communicants in 120 parishes in four dioceses across the country. Following the vote, the bishops and the Pastoral Provision parishes sent a joint petition to the Congregation for the Doctrine of the Faith requesting the erection of an ordinariate in the United States and making some suggestions about how that could be done.
- On 12 March 2010, the Anglican Catholic Church of Canada formally requested the erection of an ordinariate in Canada. The denomination subsequently split into two jurisdictions, one of which then detached and joined the ordinariate, when several congregations decided to remain Protestant and not join the Catholic Church.
- The Anglican Catholic Church in Australia (a province of the Traditional Anglican Communion) and Forward in Faith Australia, mostly members of the Anglican Church of Australia, jointly applied for an ordinariate in Australia. However, two congregations later left the denomination over the issue.
- The Church of Torres Strait, another province of the Traditional Anglican Communion in Australia, covering parts of Northern Queensland and the Torres Strait, also applied for a separate ordinariate.
- A majority of the 17 clergy of the Traditional Anglican Church (the Traditional Anglican Communion Province for England, Scotland and Wales) supported a petition for acceptance into the Catholic ordinariate.

=== Resistance by some Anglican groups ===
In September 2010, under the leadership of some Church of England bishops, the Society of St Wilfrid and St Hilda was founded on behalf of Anglo-Catholics otherwise drawn to the Roman Church who do not accept the ministry of the pope "as presently exercised".

== Purpose ==
The structure of an ordinariate enables Anglicans to enter into full communion with the Pope while preserving some degree of corporate identity and autonomy from the geographical dioceses for other Catholics of the Latin Church and maintaining distinctive elements of their Anglican "theological, spiritual and liturgical patrimony". The ordinariates integrate these groups in such ways as "to maintain the liturgical, spiritual and pastoral traditions of the Anglican Communion within the Catholic Church, as a precious gift nourishing the faith of the members of the Ordinariate and as a treasure to be shared", while also being members of the Latin Church and fully accepting the teachings of the Catholic Church.

The personal ordinariates were originally envisaged for former Anglican communities and clergy seeking to become Catholic, enabling them to retain many aspects of their Anglican liturgy and traditions. Accordingly, the ordinariates identify as Anglican culturally, but as Catholic theologically and ecclesiologically. Membership in the ordinariates, however, is not restricted exclusively to former Anglicans.

== Anglican patrimony ==
In a letter in September 2013, Archbishop Vincent Nichols, President of the Catholic Bishops' Conference of England and Wales, explained that, through the canonical structure of the ordinariate, "Anglicans who wish to enter the full communion of the Catholic Church, bringing with them some of the traditions and beauty of the Anglican heritage in which they were nurtured, may do so."

The rites of the ordinariates are characterised by revisions of Anglican rites approved by the Holy See for their use. While the Roman Rite is also permitted for the ordinariates, their official Divine Worship missal was adapted from the Book of Divine Worship that parishes of the United States' Pastoral Provision were already using before the ordinariates were instituted.

Cardinal Sarah has praised the liturgy of the ordinariate: "Certainly, cultures and other Christians bring gifts with them into the Church – the liturgy of the Ordinariates of Anglicans now in full communion with the Catholic Church is a beautiful example of this."

Some elements of the Anglican patrimony included within the charism of the Ordinariates include:

- Call to community faith and devotion
- Evangelical charity
- Sacral English
- Reverence and beauty in Worship
- Music and Congregational hymn singing
- Gospel preaching
- English theological tradition

== Prospective members ==
=== Anglicans ===
Through the ordinariates, "Anglicans who wish to enter the full communion of the Catholic Church, bringing with them some of the traditions and beauty of the Anglican heritage in which they were nurtured, may do so." However, Anglicans who join the Catholic Church are not obliged to become members of an ordinariate and can choose to belong to the Latin diocese of residence. In either form they are received by individual profession of faith. The rite of reception would normally also include the sacraments of Confirmation and Eucharist.

Anglicans who join the local Latin dioceses, either before or after the erection of an ordinariate, are permitted to join an ordinariate. Monsignor Jeffrey Steenson is an example of someone who first became a member of a Latin diocese before later being a member of an ordinariate.

=== Non-Anglicans ===
Ordinariate membership as an entry to full communion with the Catholic Church is not limited solely to members of churches in the Anglican Communion. The founding document of personal ordinariates stated that their members would either be people "originally belonging to the Anglican Communion and now in full communion with the Catholic Church" (former Anglicans) or those "who receive the Sacraments of Initiation within the jurisdiction of the Ordinariate". (The sacraments of initiation are baptism, confirmation, and eucharist.) Moreover, the personal ordinariates have extended the meaning of the word "Anglican" in this context to include members of any "Protestant Church linked to the Church of England, such as the Lutheran or Methodist Church" in Great Britain or to anyone who has ever been an "Anglican, Episcopalian, Methodist, or [Black Methodist]" in the United States. Therefore, many individuals who have never formally been part of a church in the Anglican Communion may become Catholic through an ordinariate, just as they might through any diocesan parish.

The complementary norms issued at the same time added that "those who have received all of the Sacraments of Initiation outside the Ordinariate are not ordinarily eligible for membership", but indicated that by exception "members of a family belonging to the Ordinariate" can become members also. Such people, not belonging to either of the other two categories of members, are thus a third class.

The same three categories of members are listed in the decree of erection of the Personal Ordinariate of the Chair of Saint Peter: "It includes those faithful, of every category and state of life, who, originally having belonged to the Anglican Communion, are now in full communion with the Catholic Church, or who have received the sacraments of initiation within the jurisdiction of the Ordinariate itself, or who are received into it because they are part of a family belonging to the Ordinariate."

A 2013 modification of the norms governing personal ordinariates made it clear that membership of an ordinariate is open to those who are Catholics by baptism but have not received both of the other two sacraments of initiation, if evangelising by an ordinariate brings them back to the faith and practice of the Catholic Church. Although they lack an Anglican background, they acquire membership of an ordinariate by receiving within it some of the sacraments of initiation. Other Catholics cannot "for purely subjective motives or personal preference" be enrolled in an ordinariate. However, all Catholics may regularly attend and receive communion at ordinariate services, as they can in any Latin or Eastern Catholic parish.

If membership by reception of the sacraments of initiation within an ordinariate is open not only to the Catholics mentioned in the 2013 amendment but to others also who have no Anglican background - something on which no express statement has been issued - anyone who has not yet received all three sacraments of initiation may join. This includes non-Christians, those who, in the view of the Catholic Church, do not have valid baptism (such as Mormons), and those who, again in the view of the Catholic Church, have valid baptism but not valid confirmation or Eucharist. Protestants in general are seen as lacking valid confirmation, but the Eastern churches and some Western ones, such as some Old Catholic churches and the Polish National Catholic Church, are recognized as having valid sacraments.

Latin Church priests can receive Eastern Christians, who then belong not to the Latin Church but to the respective Eastern Catholic particular church paralleling the tradition the convert entered. To be ascribed to the Latin Church (e.g. if the person intended to join the ordinariate), or to an Eastern Catholic church sui iuris other than one of the same tradition as the non-Catholic Eastern church from which the Christian arrives, permission of the Apostolic See may be necessary, although it may also occur with the permission of the respective Eastern and Latin ordinaries who have jurisdiction. Priests of a personal ordinariate are not excluded from this authority: "Anyone who is not already a Catholic can be received into the Catholic Church through the Ordinariate."

== Regional developments ==
=== Great Britain ===
Arms of the Personal Ordinariate of Our Lady of Walsingham

In October 2010, the parochial church council of St Peter's in Folkestone voted to enter the Catholic Church. About half the parish, including their priest, were received into the by then established ordinariate on 9 March 2011.

On 8 November 2010, three serving and two retired bishops of the Church of England announced their intention to join the Catholic Church. The serving bishops were provincial episcopal visitors Andrew Burnham of Ebbsfleet, Keith Newton of Richborough, along with suffragan John Broadhurst of Fulham, all of whom declared their intention to resign from the offices they held with effect from 31 December 2010. The retired bishops were Edwin Barnes, formerly of Richborough, and David Silk, formerly of Ballarat in Australia and an honorary assistant bishop in the Diocese of Exeter.

The Archbishop of Canterbury, Rowan Williams, announced that he had with regret accepted the resignations of Bishops Burnham and Newton. Alan Hopes, an auxiliary bishop in the Westminster Diocese, gave assurance of a warm welcome from the Catholic Bishops' Conference of England and Wales for those who wished to be part of an ordinariate. In a pastoral letter concerning his resignation as Bishop of Richborough, Newton stressed that he had done so not for "negative reasons about problems in the Church of England but for positive reasons in response to our Lord's prayer the night before he died, [that] 'they may all be one'". Ruth Gledhill, religious affairs correspondent of The Times, said that the announcement could prompt "hundreds, possibly thousands" of lay ministers to follow the bishops' example. She added: "It's quite significant as it means the ordinariate – that quite a few people have been saying might not get off the ground – could be a force to be reckoned with."

On 19 November 2010, the Catholic Bishops' Conference of England and Wales announced that work was proceeding with a view to establishing an ordinariate in January 2011. It also said that the five Anglican bishops would receive ordination to the Catholic diaconate and priesthood at about the same time and would then assist in the reception of other Anglicans probably in Holy Week, followed during Eastertide by diaconal ordinations and priestly ordination around Pentecost of those former Anglican clergy whose requests for ordination would have been accepted by the Congregation for the Doctrine of the Faith.

On 1 January 2011, Broadhurst, Burnham and Newton, their wives (except Burnham's wife) and three former Anglican nuns of a convent at Walsingham were received into the Catholic Church. The three men were ordained to the Catholic diaconate on 13 January and to the priesthood on 15 January. The first personal ordinariate for former Anglicans, the Personal Ordinariate of Our Lady of Walsingham, was established on 15 January 2011, with Keith Newton appointed as the first ordinary. At Easter 2011, about 900 lay people and about 60 former Anglican clergy (many retired from active ministry) joined the Catholic Church as members of the ordinariate.

In 2014, Monsignor Keith Newton, the ordinary, admitted that the ordinariate had not grown as much as was hoped. It had not yet aroused broad interest among Anglican clergy, who had not welcomed it. To revive interest among Anglican upholders of traditional Christian doctrine, the ordinariate's members, he suggested, should "communicate our message more fully and with more vigour and enthusiasm".

In 2019, the Archbishop of Canterbury Justin Welby responded to Anglican priests defecting to Rome in this way by saying "Who cares?" and that he did not mind people leaving to join other denominations as long as they are "faithful disciples of Christ".

Research completed in 2025 observed that one third of all new Catholic priests ordained since 1992 were former Anglican clergy.

=== United States and Canada ===
Arms of the Personal Ordinariate of the Chair of Saint Peter

On 1 January 2012, the ordinariate for the United States was established with the name of the Personal Ordinariate of the Chair of Saint Peter. Jeffrey N. Steenson, a former bishop of the Episcopal Church, was named as its first ordinary. In December 2012, the ordinariate was given extended jurisdiction over Canada through the newly established Canadian Deanery of St John the Baptist. Lee Kenyon, the first ordinariate priest ordained for service in Canada, was appointed as the first dean.

The Congregation for the Doctrine of the Faith appointed Cardinal Donald Wuerl, the Archbishop of Washington, as its delegate for the implementation of an ordinariate in the United States. Wuerl also led a liaison committee of three bishops of the United States Conference of Catholic Bishops for implementation of the ordinariate.

The Congregation for the Doctrine of the Faith also appointed Thomas Collins, Archbishop of Toronto, as its delegate for implementation of an ordinariate in Canada. Collins also led a liaison committee of bishops of the Canadian Conference of Catholic Bishops.

In November 2010, the Parish of Our Lady of the Atonement in San Antonio, Texas, the first Anglican Use parish under the Pastoral Provision, hosted a seminar called "Becoming One" to build relationships and to disseminate information about the possibility of establishing a personal ordinariate in the United States. It was well attended by interested parties from the United States and Canada. In March 2011 a similar conference was held in Mississauga, Ontario, for those interested from across Canada. Christopher Phillips, one of the guest speakers at the conference, celebrated the first Anglican Use Mass in Canadian history at St Joseph's Streetsville for the Feast of the Annunciation.

A pastoral letter dated 30 November 2010 from John Hepworth, primate of the Traditional Anglican Communion, stated that announcements similar to those for England and Wales and for Australia were expected to be issued soon concerning Canada and the United States. He also stated that Robert Mercer, a retired bishop resident in England who had been the Anglican Bishop of Matabeleland and then a bishop in the Anglican Catholic Church of Canada (a Continuing Anglican church), intended to join the ordinariate for England and Wales.

However, most of the "continuing" Anglican Church in America (TAC) drew back from joining the ordinariate. Of the Anglican Church in America parishes, St. Barnabas Church of Omaha, Nebraska accepted the offer of the Holy See and became part of the ordinariate. Only three parishes from the Episcopal Church (Anglican Communion) were interested, and two of these were embroiled in multimillion-dollar lawsuits over their church property.

In May 2011, preparations for members of the Traditional Anglican Communion in Canada to join an ordinariate were put on hold in view of reports about intended announcements by Collins that those intending to join the ordinariate would have to close their Traditional Anglican parishes and attend a Catholic parish for four to six months and that the dossiers submitted by the clergy concerned showed that their training was inadequate, requiring them to attend a Catholic seminary for an unspecified time. Archbishop denied the reports.

In early June 2011, in advance of the report that Wuerl was due to present to the United States Conference of Catholic Bishops on interest shown in joining an ordinariate, a 100-member Episcopal parish in Bladensburg, Maryland was reported to have become the first in the United States to ask to be received into the Catholic Church while keeping aspects of its Anglican traditions. Other accounts give Mount Calvary Church in Baltimore as the first, and the Bladensburg church as the second.

In his report to the bishops' conference, Wuerl stated that the Holy See had indicated its wish to establish an ordinariate in the United States before the end of 2011. At the next meeting of the Bishops Conference, on 15 November, he announced that, with the approval of Pope Benedict XVI, 1 January 2012 would be the date of establishment of the new ordinariate for former Anglicans in the United States. He said that of 67 petitions by United States Anglican clergy for ordination as Catholic priests 35 had already received the nihil obstat of the Holy See and would be examined locally for possible acceptance. He also said that two Anglican communities had already entered into full communion with the Catholic Church, one in the Diocese of Fort Worth, the other in the Archdiocese of Washington.

The ordinariate dedicated its chancery building 1 February 2015, behind and adjacent to its principal church, the Church of Our Lady of Walsingham in Houston, Texas, at which time it also celebrated the publication of the new Divine Worship missal for use in its public worship.

On 24 November 2015, the Holy See announced that Fr. Steven J. Lopes would be the first bishop of the Personal Ordinariate of the Chair of Saint Peter. In assuming that responsibility, he succeeded Monsignor Jeffrey N. Steenson, a former Episcopal bishop appointed by Pope Benedict XVI to the position of "ordinary" in 2012. The appointment of Lopes marked the first time a Catholic bishop had been appointed to any of the world's three ordinariates erected for former Anglicans. On 2 February 2016, Lopes was consecrated a bishop in Houston and took up his appointment as prelate of the ordinariate.

=== Australia and Japan ===
At the end of November 2010, Peter Elliott, an auxiliary bishop in Melbourne, Australia, said that the Australian bishops intended to follow the example of England and Wales so that an initially "very small" ordinariate could be established in that country, with specific churches designated for its use, by Pentecost 2011. A former Anglican layman, Elliott is designated as the delegate of the Congregation for the Doctrine of the Faith and a liaison to the Australian Catholic Bishops' Conference. He expected that, once established, the proposed Australian ordinariate would attract "a much larger number of people". An Australian ordinariate implementation committee was formed in mid-December 2010.

A national Australian ordinariate festival was held in February 2011 at Coomera in Queensland. The conference was hosted by Elliott and Archbishop John Hepworth of the Anglican Catholic Church in Australia.

People from the Catholic Church attended, as well as members of the Anglican Church of Australia, the Anglican Catholic Church in Australia, the Church of Torres Strait and the Ukrainian Catholic Church, as well as some Anglican religious who wish to be part of the ordinariate. The implementation committee had its inaugural meeting after the conference.

The consensus of the festival was that unity can be achieved while also preserving the distinctive Anglican heritage of the churches. Elliott said that membership in the ordinariate by interested persons is sought by a formal application in writing. All clergy transferring to the ordinariate will require a Catholic priest as sponsor and ordination within the Catholic Church.

In a radio discussion on 20 February 2011, Hepworth said that some 800 people of his own church, the Anglican Catholic Church in Australia, were committed to joining an ordinariate and that he believed, once implemented, it would grow strongly. The possibility of the Church of Torres Strait (some 9,000 people) joining was also discussed on the radio program.

A conference and synod of the Church of Torres Strait, held from 3 to 5 June 2011, decided unanimously to accept the idea of the church becoming a Catholic ordinariate and set a target date of the First Sunday in Advent in 2011 for its implementation after first finding out how many of its membership wish to join the ordinariate.

In his address to an ordinariate information day in Melbourne on 11 June 2011, Elliott said that the Australian ordinariate was expected to be established in 2012. He also confirmed that the petition of the Church of Torres Strait had been sent to Rome.

However Hepworth, a former Catholic priest who has been married twice, could not be an ordained bishop of the proposed ordinariate. A statement issued by the TAC's College of Bishops following a meeting in Johannesburg in March 2012 stated that the body had voted to remain Anglican, despite Hepworth's efforts.

As announced by the Australian Catholic Bishops' Conference on 11 May 2012, the Congregation for the Doctrine of the Faith established the Personal Ordinariate of Our Lady of the Southern Cross on 15 June 2012. The 72-year-old Harry Entwistle, who had been the Western Regional bishop (based in Perth, Western Australia) of the Anglican Catholic Church in Australia was appointed the first ordinary and was ordained a priest in the Catholic Church on the same day.

Since its inception, the ordinariate has grown to include twelve Australian congregations in Queensland, Victoria, Western Australia, South Australia, and New South Wales. In February 2015, a congregation of the Traditional Anglican Church of Japan was received as the Ordinariate Community of St. Augustine of Canterbury, the first ordinariate community in Asia. Another community in Mihara, Hiroshima has since joined.

== Nature of the ordinariates ==
The Congregation for the Doctrine of the Faith establishes, in consultation with the episcopal conference concerned, personal ordinariates for former Anglicans within the episcopal conference's area. There may be more than one personal ordinariate, delimited geographically or otherwise, within the territory of the same episcopal conference. Each ordinariate, composed of lay faithful, clergy, and members of religious institutes originally belonging to the Anglican Communion and now in full communion with the Catholic Church, is juridically comparable to a diocese. The ordinary of each ordinariate, who may be either a bishop or a priest, chosen on the basis of a terna of names presented by the governing council of the ordinariate, is canonically equivalent to a diocesan bishop and an ex officio member of the respective episcopal conference.,

An ordinariate shall have a governing council composed of at least six priests and chaired by the ordinary, that exercise the combined functions of the Presbyteral Council and the College of Consultors of a diocese. Each ordinariate is also to have a finance council and a pastoral council to perform the same functions as the respective bodies in a diocese. An ordinariate also may establish its own tribunal to process marriage and other cases, though the local diocesan tribunals retain jurisdiction if the ordinariate does not set up a tribunal of its own.

The ordinary cannot be a bishop if married or with dependent children. In that case, while not having episcopal holy orders, in particular the power to ordain to the diaconate, priesthood and episcopacy, he has the powers and privileges of other prelates who are canonically equivalent to diocesan bishops, such as territorial prelates. It is he who by issuing dimissorial letters admits candidates to holy orders, having first obtained the consent of the governing council. As an ordinary, he may personally install such candidates in the preliminary ministries of lector and acolyte. Like other equivalents of diocesan bishops, he is a full member of the episcopal conference and may use certain episcopal symbols, such as mitre, crosier, ring, pectoral cross, zucchetto, choir dress with purple cassock.

After having heard the opinion of the local diocesan bishop, the ordinary may, with the consent of the governing council and of the Holy See, erect "deaneries", each supervised by a "delegate", that encompass multiple parishes of the ordinariate. The ordinary may also establish and suppress parishes and houses of formation and approve programs of formation with the consent of the governing council.

Like diocesan bishops, the ordinary must make an ad limina apostolorum visit to Rome every five years. During this visit, the ordinary presents a report on the status of his ordinariate to the Pope through the Congregation for the Doctrine of the Faith and in consultation with the Congregation for Bishops and the Congregation for the Evangelization of Peoples.

On 9 April 2019, the Congregation for the Doctrine of the Faith promulgated an update to the complementary norms governing personal ordinariates. The new norms were approved on 19 March 2019.

=== Anglican Use (Divine Worship) ===
The ordinariates use modified Anglican ritual known as the Anglican Use and have full faculties to celebrate the Eucharist and the other sacraments, the Liturgy of the Hours and other liturgical functions in accordance with the liturgical books proper to Anglican tradition, in revisions approved by the Holy See, so as to maintain the Anglican liturgical, spiritual and pastoral traditions. This faculty does not exclude liturgical celebrations according to the Roman Rite.

The Complementary Norms clearly envision considerable pastoral collaboration between the clergy of parishes of personal ordinariates and the clergy of the dioceses within which they would be located. The Complementary Norms also specifically grant faculties to the pastor of a geographical parish that has a parish of a personal ordinariate within its boundary to supply liturgical and pastoral services consistent with the needs of the congregation of a parish of an ordinariate that does not have a parochial vicar assigned in the event of the death, incapacity, or unexpected absence of its pastor.

Initially, ordinariate liturgies followed the Anglican Use as contained within the Book of Divine Worship of the parishes of the Pastoral Provision, incorporating "the sacral language of the Book of Common Prayer... and many elements of the English Missal." In Advent 2013, however, all three ordinariates adopted a newly revised Order of Mass, approved by the Congregation for the Doctrine of the Faith and the Congregation for Divine Worship, which "decided on the generic title 'Divine Worship' for the entire liturgical provision for the Personal Ordinariates, though the term 'Ordinariate Use' may still be used as shorthand."

=== Anglican religious institutes ===
The apostolic constitution provides a juridical framework within which an Anglican religious community may join the Catholic Church as a group: "Institutes of Consecrated Life originating in the Anglican Communion and entering into full communion with the Catholic Church may also be placed under his (the ordinary's) jurisdiction by mutual consent." The ordinary may also erect new societies of apostolic life and institutes of consecrated life with the permission of the Holy See.

=== Married former Anglican clergy and rules on celibacy ===
The Catholic Church does not recognise the validity of Anglican ordination (see Apostolicae curae), so all who were ordained in the Anglican Communion must receive ordination in the Catholic Church to continue their ministry. The Apostolic Constitution reaffirms in principle the discipline of clerical celibacy for clergy of the Latin Church, but allows ordination of married former Anglican clergy to the orders of deacon and priest in the service of an ordinariate: "Those who ministered as Anglican deacons, priests, or bishops, [...] may be accepted by the Ordinary as candidates for Holy Orders in the Catholic Church". "In consideration of Anglican ecclesial tradition and practice, the Ordinary may present to the Holy Father [the Pope] a request for the admission of married men to the presbyterate in the Ordinariate". This request is granted on a case-by-case basis, not as a matter of course but by exception: "The norms established in the Encyclical Letter of Pope Paul VI Sacerdotalis caelibatus, n. 42 and in the Statement In June are to be observed."

On the basis of objective criteria determined by the ordinary in consultation with the episcopal conference and approved by the Holy See, the ordinary may petition the Pope, on a case-by-case basis, to admit married men to the priesthood as a derogation of canon 277 §1 of the 1983 Code of Canon Law, but the general rule is that the ordinariate will admit only celibate men. No married man may be ordained a bishop.

=== Provisions for former Anglican bishops ===
Ordination of married men to the episcopacy is excluded in the Catholic tradition, but the apostolic constitution's complementary norms include provisions which take into account the position of married former Anglican bishops.

- A married former Anglican bishop may be ordained as a priest, in the same manner as a married former Anglican priest.
- A former Anglican bishop may be appointed as the ordinary and thus exercise ecclesiastical governance equivalent to that of a bishop. If married, he will be ordained as a priest. The ordinary is, ex officio, a full member of the episcopal conference regardless of the degree of holy orders to which he is ordained.
- The ordinary may call upon a former Anglican bishop who is a member of the ordinariate to assist in its administration. This provision could encompass a role analogous to that of an auxiliary bishop within a diocese or as the "delegate" in charge of a "deanery".
- Any former Anglican bishop who is a member of an ordinariate may be invited to participate in the meetings of the episcopal conference, with the status of a retired bishop.
- In addition, a former Anglican bishop who has not been ordained a bishop in the Catholic Church may nonetheless receive permission to use episcopal insignia. This has precedent in the Catholic Church with cases of unordained abbots and abbesses.

Overall, these provisions provide considerable flexibility to preserve both the dignity of office and the opportunity for comparable pastoral leadership of former Anglican bishops who are not eligible for episcopal ordination in the Catholic Church. Note that a former Anglican "diocese" with a married bishop could in fact remain intact as an "ordinariate" with its former bishop, ordained as a priest but granted permission to wear episcopal insignia, serving as its "ordinary".

== Similar institutions ==
The personal ordinariates that the apostolic constitution envisages are similar to military ordinariates for the pastoral care of members of armed forces in that membership is on a personal rather than a territorial basis; but they differ in many aspects, as can be seen by a comparison of Anglicanorum coetibus with the apostolic constitution Spirituali militum cura of 21 April 1986 by which Pope John Paul II restructured the military ordinariates, which were previously called military vicariates. For instance, the military ordinariates must be headed by a bishop and lack structures such as the "governing council" of the ordinariates for former Anglicans.

The personal ordinariates for former Anglicans differ also from personal prelatures (the only one existing now being Opus Dei), which, according to canon law, "are composed of deacons and priests of the secular clergy", to whose apostolic works lay people can dedicate themselves by way of agreements made with the prelature. with no mention of members of religious institutes. A major difference between a "personal ordinariate" and a "personal prelature" is that ordinariates (both personal and military) may erect parishes and those who inscribe themselves in the apposite register effectively become transients in their geographic diocese (no accumulative membership).

Membership of a personal ordinariate for former Anglicans extends to "lay faithful, clerics and members of Institutes of Consecrated Life and Societies of Apostolic Life, originally belonging to the Anglican Communion and now in full communion with the Catholic Church, or those who receive the Sacraments of Initiation within the jurisdiction of the Ordinariate".

Much more similar are the eight ordinariates for the faithful of eastern rite, which are listed in the Annuario Pontificio together with the seventeen apostolic exarchates, immediately before the ordinariates for former Anglicans. Of the ordinariates for the faithful of eastern rite, four (in Argentina, Brazil, France and Poland) are generically for all Eastern Catholics who lack an ordinary of their own rite with jurisdiction for the particular country and who are therefore entrusted to the care of a Latin archbishop in the country. The one in Austria is for Catholics belonging to any of the fourteen particular Churches that use the Byzantine Rite. The other three (Eastern Europe, Greece and Romania) are for members of the Armenian Catholic Church. Such ordinariates have been in existence for a century, having been introduced by the apostolic letter Officium supremi Apostolatus of 15 July 1912.

=== Comparisons with the Eastern Catholic churches ===
While the personal ordinariates preserve a certain corporate identity of Anglicans received into the Catholic Church, they are canonically within the Latin Church and share the same theological emphasis and in this way differ from the Eastern Catholic churches, which are autonomous particular churches.

The Latin Church, as a rule, restricts ordination to the priesthood to celibate men – and also to the diaconate except when, by decision of the episcopal conference, married men "of more mature age" (at least 35 years old) may be ordained to the diaconate. In this also the ordinariates for former Anglicans differ from those Eastern Catholic churches in which priesthood and diaconate are open to married men as well as to celibates. The Holy See may grant exceptions for the ordinariates to the general rule on a case-by-case basis for married former Anglican clergy but not for married laymen.

=== Prospects for the establishment of other personal ordinariates ===
On 30 October 2012, Cardinal Kurt Koch, President of the Pontifical Council for Promoting Christian Unity, said in an interview that if Lutherans express a wish for an arrangement similar to the personal ordinariates for former Anglicans, the Catholic Church will have to reflect on it, but that the initiative must come from Lutherans. Archbishop Gerhard Ludwig Müller, Prefect of the Congregation for the Doctrine of the Faith, commented on 11 January 2013 that, while the situation of Lutherans is different from that of Anglicans, the Holy See might consider an ordinariate for those among them who might wish to become members of the Catholic Church while retaining "the legitimate traditions they have developed". The Lutheran World Federation General Secretary, Martin Junge, expressed concern at the idea, saying that it would create further difficulties in ecumenical dialogue and discourage the commitment of Lutherans to celebrate in 2017 the 500th anniversary of the Protestant Reformation "in a spirit of ecumenical understanding and cooperation".

The ordinariate structure has also been proposed as a potential option for Hebrew Catholics seeking to restore their corporate life as a Jewish church.

== See also ==
- Anglican–Roman Catholic dialogue
- List of Anglican bishops who converted to Catholicism
- Personal prelature
