= Personal Ordinariate of the Chair of Saint Peter =

Diocese-like institution of the Latin Catholic Church in the United States

Personal Ordinariate of the Chair of Saint Peter Ordinariatus Personalis Cathedrae Sancti Petri Ordinariat personnel Chaire-de-Saint-Pierre

Catholic
- Coat of arms

Location
- Country: United States; Canada
- Ecclesiastical province: Immediately subject to the Holy See
- Deaneries: Deanery of St John the Baptist

Statistics
- Parishes: 40 (2023)
- Members: 12,031 (2023)

Information
- Denomination: Catholic Church
- Sui iuris church: Latin Church
- Rite: Anglican Use (Divine Worship) of the Roman Rite
- Established: January 1, 2012; 14 years ago
- Cathedral: Our Lady of Walsingham
- Patroness: Our Lady of Walsingham
- Secular priests: 79 (2023)

Current leadership
- Pope: Leo XIV
- Bishop: Steven J. Lopes

Website
- ordinariate.net

The Personal Ordinariate of the Chair of Saint Peter (Latin: Ordinariatus Personalis Cathedrae Sancti Petri) is a Latin Church or personal ordinariate of the Catholic Church for Anglican (Episcopal) converts in the United States and Canada. Former members of communions of "Anglican heritage" such as Methodist churches are included.

Ordinariate parishes maintain elements of Anglican liturgy and tradition in their Masses and worship services. The ordinariate is under the direct authority of the Holy See.

The Personal Ordinariate of the Chair of Saint Peter includes more than 40 parishes and missions with 12,000 members in the United States and Canada. It is based in Houston, Texas, with the Cathedral of Our Lady of Walsingham as its principal church.

The liturgy of the ordinariate, known as the Anglican Use, is a form of the Roman Rite with the introduction of traditional English Catholic and Anglican elements. Also called "Divine Worship" or the "Ordinariate Use", the Mass is celebrated according to Divine Worship: The Missal and the canonical hours according to Divine Worship: Daily Office.

The ordinariate describes itself as "a structure, similar to a diocese, that was created by the Holy See in 2012 for former Anglican communities and clergy seeking to become Catholic. Once Catholic, the communities retain many aspects of their Anglican heritage, liturgy, and traditions". It has also been described as "a special kind of diocese confined to specific national territory – much like a military ordinariate that serves members of a national armed forces".

The original ordinariate territory was the same as that of the United States Conference of Catholic Bishops (USCCB). However, the Vatican announced on December 7, 2012, that after consulting the Canadian Conference of Catholic Bishops (CCCB), it was extending the ordinariate to include Canada. Accordingly, the head of the ordinariate, currently Bishop Steven J. Lopes, is a full member of both the USCCB and the CCCB.

== Structure ==
According to the decree of its erection, the ordinariate is juridically equivalent to a diocese. The parishioners are led by an ordinary who is named directly by the pope. The ordinary may be a bishop, if celibate, or a priest, if married.

Initially, the Holy See named all married ordinaries as apostolic protonotaries – that is, monsignors of the highest rank – soon after the respective appointments to that office. In the case of an ordinary who is an apostolic protonotary, the ordinary holds the same power of governance over the ordinariate that a diocesan bishop holds over a diocese. The only practical difference is that a bishop may ordain clergy for the ordinariate personally, whereas a non-bishop ordinary must ask a bishop to ordain clergy. In 2016, the ordinariate became the first personal ordinariate to receive a bishop with the episcopal ordination and installation of Steven J. Lopes, a bishop, as its second ordinary.

The ordinary of an ordinariate is canonically equivalent to a diocesan bishop, and thus wears the same ecclesiastical attire and uses the same pontifical insignia (mitre, crosier, pectoral cross, and episcopal ring) as a diocesan bishop, even if he is not a bishop. The ordinary is also, ex officio, a full member of the episcopal conference(s) of the territory of the ordinariate.

== History ==
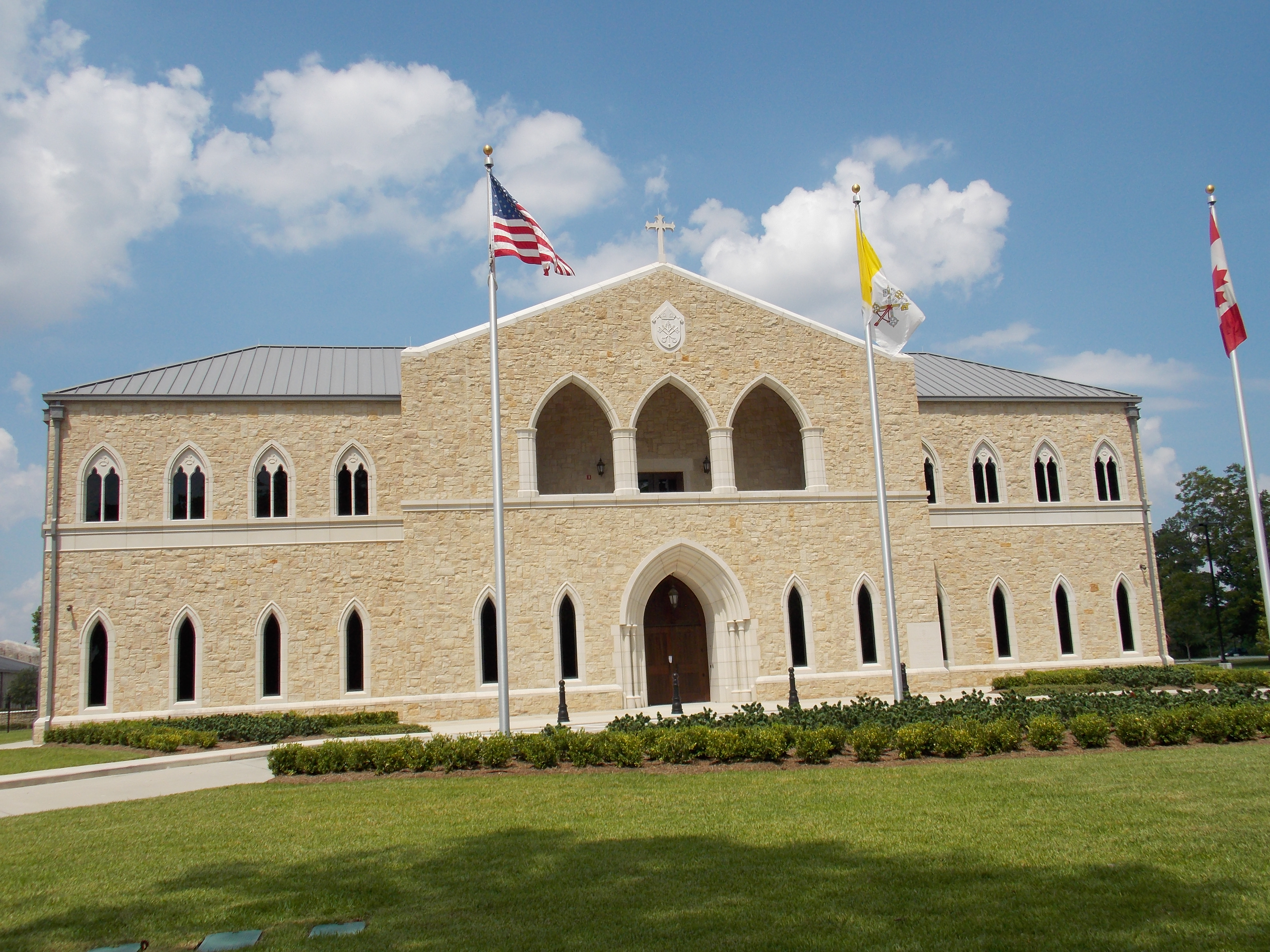
Chancery building in Houston, Texas

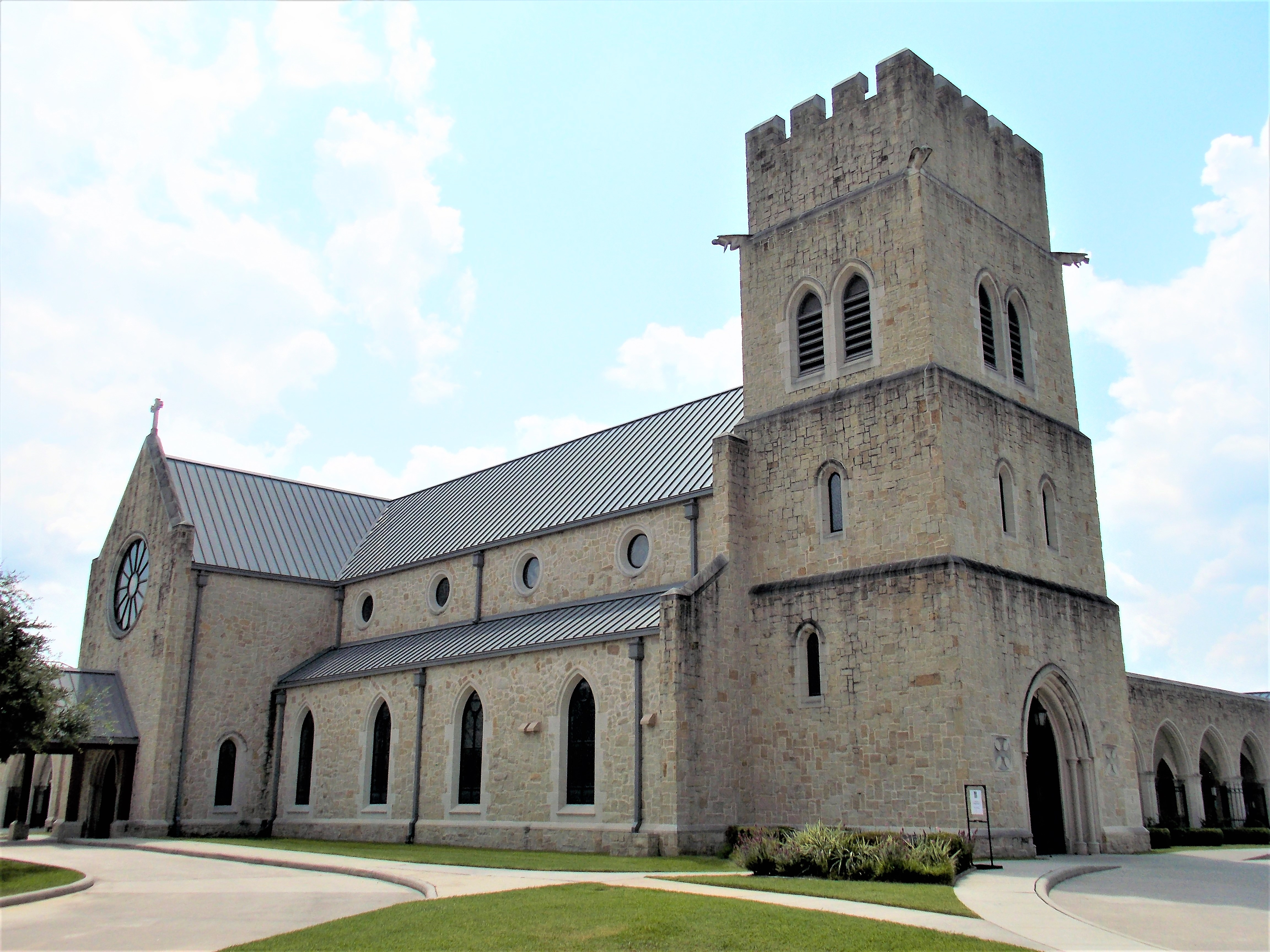
Cathedral of Our Lady of Walsingham in Houston

=== Background ===
In the early 21st century, a number of bishops from the Church of England and the bishops of the Traditional Anglican Communion (TAC), a global "continuing Anglican" body, independently approached the Holy See seeking some manner of corporate reunion that would preserve their autonomy and their ecclesial structure within the Catholic Church. Many of these bishops were unhappy with changes within the Anglican Church, such as the ordination of female and LGBT priests, and the consecration of same sex marriages.

In response, Pope Benedict XVI promulgated the apostolic constitution Anglicanorum coetibus, permitting erection of personal ordinariates equivalent to dioceses, on November 4, 2009.

=== Formation ===
Pursuant to Anglicanorum coetibus, the Vatican erected three ordinariates over the next three years in countries where interest among prospective Anglican clergy and communities was strongest:

- the Personal Ordinariate of Our Lady of Walsingham in England and Wales on January 15, 2011
- the Personal Ordinariate of the Chair of Saint Peter in the territory of the United States Conference of Catholic Bishops on January 1, 2012. It later acquired extraterritorial communities in Canada.
- the Personal Ordinariate of Our Lady of the Southern Cross in the territory of the Australian Conference of Catholic Bishops on June 15, 2012.

The decree erecting the Personal Ordinariate of the Chair of St. Peter designated the Church of Our Lady of Walsingham in Houston, Texas, as its principal church, analogous to the cathedral church of a diocese.

=== Growth ===
In the first weeks after the erection of the ordinariate, over 100 Anglican clergy applied to be Catholic priests in the ordinariate, and over 1,400 lay people joined. Within the first year of the ordinariate's existence, the number of communities joining the ordinariate grew to nearly three dozen. As of 2017, there were 43 parishes and missions (canonically, "quasi-parishes") within the ordinariate.

On April 19, 2012, the Archbishop of Ottawa, Terrence Prendergast, received 30 Anglicans into the Catholic Church. They included Carl Reid, until then a bishop of the Anglican Catholic Church of Canada (ACCC). The same week in the Diocese of Victoria in British Columbia, another 23 Anglicans, including Peter Wilkinson, until then the Diocesan Bishop of the ACCC, were received into the Catholic church. These new arrivals immediately formed communities of the ordinariate.

On June 26, 2012, Randy Sly, a former archbishop in the Charismatic Episcopal Church, was ordained to the priesthood by Bishop Paul Loverde in Potomac Falls, Virginia. On September 16, 2012, the Cathedral of the Incarnation, the cathedral of the Diocese of Eastern United States of the Anglican Church in America, was received into the ordinariate along with their bishop, Louis Campese.

On February 4, 2015, the ordinariate dedicated a new chancery building, on property adjacent to its principal church (which would become its cathedral with the installation of its first bishop in 2016), Our Lady of Walsingham, in Houston.

On November 24, 2015, Pope Francis appointed Steven J. Lopes as the first bishop of the personal ordinariate. It was announced that on February 2, 2016, that he would succeed the ordinariate's first ordinary, Jeffrey N. Steenson. This appointment was the first time a bishop has been named to any of the three personal ordinariates. With the appointment of a bishop to head the ordinariate, the principal church was elevated to a cathedral, the third in Houston.

In 2017, the ordinariate inducted the last of the Anglican Use parishes originally erected under the provisions of the 1980 Pastoral Provision with the decree, on March 21, by the Vatican that "all parishes of the Pastoral Provision are to be incorporated into the Ordinariate." With this decree, Our Lady of the Atonement in San Antonio – the first and also largest of the Pastoral Provision parishes founded by Rev. Christopher Phillips – became a parish of the ordinariate, along with its clergy. Our Lady of the Atonement also brought with it the ordinariate's first K–12 Catholic school, The Atonement Academy, with over five hundred students. The other remaining Pastoral Provision parish, the Congregation of St. Athanasius in Boston, also joined the ordinariate pursuant to the Holy See's decree.

=== Liturgy and Eucharist ===
Upon erection of the first ordinariates, the Holy See established the commission Anglicanae Traditiones to prepare liturgical books of the Anglican tradition for their use, and also for use of the communities of former Anglicans who remain under the jurisdiction of their local dioceses. This commission, under the direction of Steven Lopes, first published Divine Worship: Occasional Services containing rites for baptisms, weddings, and funerals, followed by Divine Worship: The Missal containing the rite for Mass to replace the respective rites in the Book of Divine Worship. The ordinariate missal took effect on November 27, 2015. Bishop (then bishop-elect) Steven Lopes and Jeffrey Steenson were the principal celebrants of the first mass at the ordinariate's principal church according to the new missal.

In his pastoral letter, "Come, Holy Ghost," released February 14, 2020, Bishop Lopes revealed the ordinariate would become the 14th Latin Church episcopal jurisdiction in the U.S. to make the reception of eucharist normally follow confirmation. It is an arrangement of the sacraments often described as "restored order", with a focus on involving the child's family in sacramental preparation. He said the norm in the ordinariate will be to admit a child to confirmation and eucharist "around the age of discretion, [according to canon law] being sometime between the ages of 7 and 11."

In late 2020, the ordinariate published an Anglican Use form of the Liturgy of the Hours, the Divine Worship: Daily Office: North American Edition. The Personal Ordinariates of Our Lady of Walsingham and Our Lady of the Southern Cross published their own version in late 2021, Divine Worship: Daily Office: Commonwealth Edition.

== Deanery of St. John the Baptist ==
In April 2012, Steenson accepted the proposal that all Canadian Anglican converts should be organized as parishes of a deanery of the ordinariate. On December 7, 2012, the ordinariate formally erected the Deanery of Saint John the Baptist for the Canadian parishes. Steenson appointed Kenyon as its first dean, with the approval of the Holy See and the support of the Canadian Conference of Catholic Bishops.

On December 8, 2012, Peter Wilkinson, the former Metropolitan Bishop of Canada of the ACCC, was ordained as a Catholic priest by Bishop Richard Gagnon at St. Andrew's Cathedral in Victoria. Wilkinson was later named a prelate of honor by Pope Benedict XVI. On January 26, 2013, Carl Reid, a former ACCC bishop, was ordained by Archbishop Terrence Prendergast at the Notre-Dame Cathedral Basilica in Ottawa.

== Liturgical calendar ==
The liturgical calendar of the ordinariate was approved by the Congregation for Divine Worship and the Discipline of the Sacraments in early 2012. It is nearly identical with the two current versions of the Roman liturgical calendar for the dioceses of the United States and Canada, but it has retained some elements that form part of the Anglican patrimony.

Regarding the Proper of Saints, the ordinariate follows the proper calendar of the United States (or in the Deanery of St. John the Baptist, that of Canada), as well as the following observances:

Change	Month	Day	Title of the liturgy	Rank	Color
Added	January	12	Saint Benedict Biscop, Abbot	Optional Memorial	White
Added	February	4	Saint Gilbert of Sempringham, Religious	Optional Memorial	White
Elevated (Note: This entry is listed on the General Roman Calendar but with the lower rank of Feast.)	February	22	Chair of Saint Peter the Apostle	Solemnity	White
Added	March	1	Saint David, Bishop	Optional Memorial	White
Elevated (Note: This entry is listed on the General Roman Calendar but with the lower rank of Optional Memorial.)	April	23	Saint George, Martyr	Memorial	Red
Transferred (Note: This entry is listed under a different date on the General Roman Calendar (April 23) but is transferred here in this calendar.)	April	24	Saint Adalbert, Bishop and Martyr	Optional Memorial	Red
Added	May	4	The English Martyrs	Memorial	Red
Added	May	19	Saints Dunstan, Ethelwold, and Oswald, Bishops	Optional Memorial	White
Added	June	9	Saint Columba, Abbot	Optional Memorial	White
Added	June	16	Saint Richard of Chichester, Bishop	Optional Memorial	White
Added	June	20	Saint Alban, protomartyr of England	Optional Memorial	White
Elevated (Note: This entry is listed on the General Roman Calendar but with the lower rank of Optional Memorial.)	June	22	Saints John Fisher, Bishop, and Thomas More, Martyrs	Memorial	Red
Transferred (Note: This entry is listed under a different date on the General Roman Calendar (June 22) but is transferred here in this calendar.)	June	23	Paulinus of Nola, Bishop	Optional Memorial	White
Added	June	23	Saints Hilda, Etheldreda, and Mildred, and All Holy Nuns	Optional Memorial	White
Added	July	9	Our Lady of the Atonement	Optional Memorial	White
Added	August	30	Saints Margaret Clitherow, Anne Line, and Margaret Ward, Martyrs	Optional Memorial	Red
Added	August	31	Saint Aidan, Bishop, and the Saints of Lindisfarne	Optional Memorial	White
Added	September	4	Saint Cuthbert, Bishop	Optional Memorial	White
Added	September	19	Saint Theodore of Canterbury, Bishop	Optional Memorial	White
Added	September	19	Saint Adrian, Abbot	Optional Memorial	White
Added	September	24	Our Lady of Walsingham, Patroness of the Ordinariate	Feast	White
Transferred (Note: This entry is listed under a different date on the General Roman Calendar (October 9) but is transferred here in this calendar.)	October	8	Saint Denis and Companions, Martyrs	Optional Memorial	Red
Transferred (Note: This entry is listed under a different date on the General Roman Calendar (October 9) but is transferred here in this calendar.)	October	8	Saint John Leonardi, Priest	Optional Memorial	White
Added	October	12	Saint Wilfrid	Optional Memorial	White
Added	October	13	Saint Edward the Confessor	Optional Memorial	White
Added	November	20	Saint Edmund, Martyr	Optional Memorial	Red

== Leadership ==
The following individuals have served as head of the personal ordinariate:

No.	Picture	Name	Position	Date installed	Term ended	Term of office	Reason for term end	Notes	Coat-of-arms
1		Monsignor Jeffrey N. Steenson	Ordinary	February 12, 2012	November 24, 2015	3 years, 285 days	Retired	Developed program for Anglican priests wishing to join the Catholic Church. Continued as Administrator until successor installed.	
2		Bishop Steven Joseph Lopes	Bishop	February 2, 2016	present	10 years, 276 days	(incumbent)		

== See also ==
- List of Anglican bishops who converted to Roman Catholicism
