= Steven J. Lopes =

American Catholic prelate (born 1975)

The Most Reverend Steven J. Lopes
- Bishop of the Personal Ordinariate of the Chair of Saint Peter
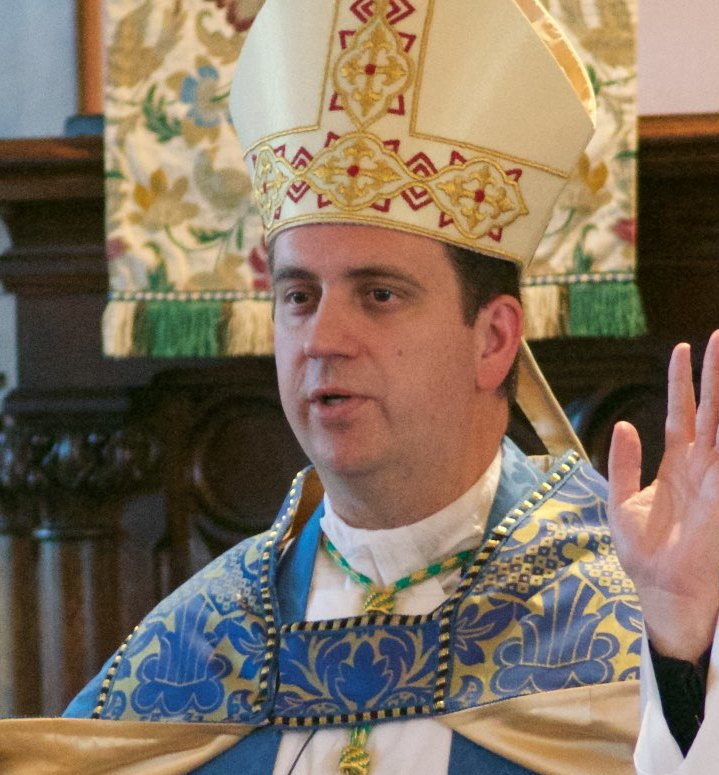
- Lopes in 2019
- Church: Catholic
- Diocese: Personal Ordinariate of the Chair of Saint Peter
- See: Houston, Texas
- Appointed: November 24, 2015
- Installed: February 2, 2016
- Predecessor: Jeffrey N. Steenson
- Other post: Apostolic administrator of the Personal Ordinariate of Our Lady of the Southern Cross

Orders
- Ordination: June 23, 2001 by William Levada
- Consecration: February 2, 2016 by Gerhard Ludwig Müller

Personal details
- Born: April 22, 1975 (age 51) Fremont, California, United States
- Education: University of San Francisco; Saint Patrick's Seminary and University; Pontifical Gregorian University
- Motto: Magna opera Domini (Latin for 'Great are the works of the Lord')
- Styles
- Reference style: His Excellency; The Most Reverend
- Spoken style: Your Excellency
- Religious style: Bishop

Steven Joseph Lopes (Portuguese pronunciation: [ˈlɔpɨʃ]; born April 22, 1975) is an American Catholic prelate who serves as Bishop of the Personal Ordinariate of the Chair of Saint Peter, a Catholic community that celebrates the Anglican Use in North America. He has also been the apostolic administrator of the Personal Ordinariate of Our Lady of the Southern Cross in Australia since May 11, 2026.

== Early life and education ==
A native of Fremont, California, Lopes was born on April 22, 1975, the only child of José de Oliveira Lopes and Barbara Jane Lopes. His father was from Portugal and his mother from Poland. He was educated at Catholic schools in California: St. Pius School in Redwood City, St. Edward's School in Newark, and Moreau Catholic High School in Hayward.

Lopes studied at the St. Ignatius Institute at the University of San Francisco, and also pursued studies at the University of Innsbruck in Austria. His philosophical studies and preparation for the priesthood took place at St. Patrick's Seminary in Menlo Park, California, before he was assigned to study theology in Rome. There he obtained a licentiate at the Pontifical Gregorian University while living at the Pontifical North American College.

== Ordained ministry ==
Lopes was ordained to the diaconate on October 5, 2000, during a Mass at St. Peter's Basilica, Rome. He was ordained a priest on June 23, 2001, for the Archdiocese of San Francisco by William Levada during a service at Cathedral of Saint Mary of the Assumption, San Francisco. He served in two parishes in California as an associate pastor; St. Patrick's Catholic Church, San Francisco, and St. Anselm Catholic Church in Ross, California.

Lopes returned to Rome to obtain a doctorate in theology from the Gregorian University. Since 2005, he has served as an official of the Holy See's Congregation for the Doctrine of the Faith, while also serving as a professor of theology at the Gregorian. During that time, he served as a personal aide to William Cardinal Levada, who was prefect for the Congregation of the Doctrine of the Faith from 2005 to 2012. On July 10, 2010, he was appointed a Chaplain of His Holiness and therefore was then addressed as "Monsignor." Starting in 2012, Lopes served as the secretary of the Vatican commission Anglicanae Traditiones, which was formed with the goal of developing a missal that would blend Anglican and Roman Rite liturgical elements for the use of the personal ordinariates.

=== Episcopal ministry ===
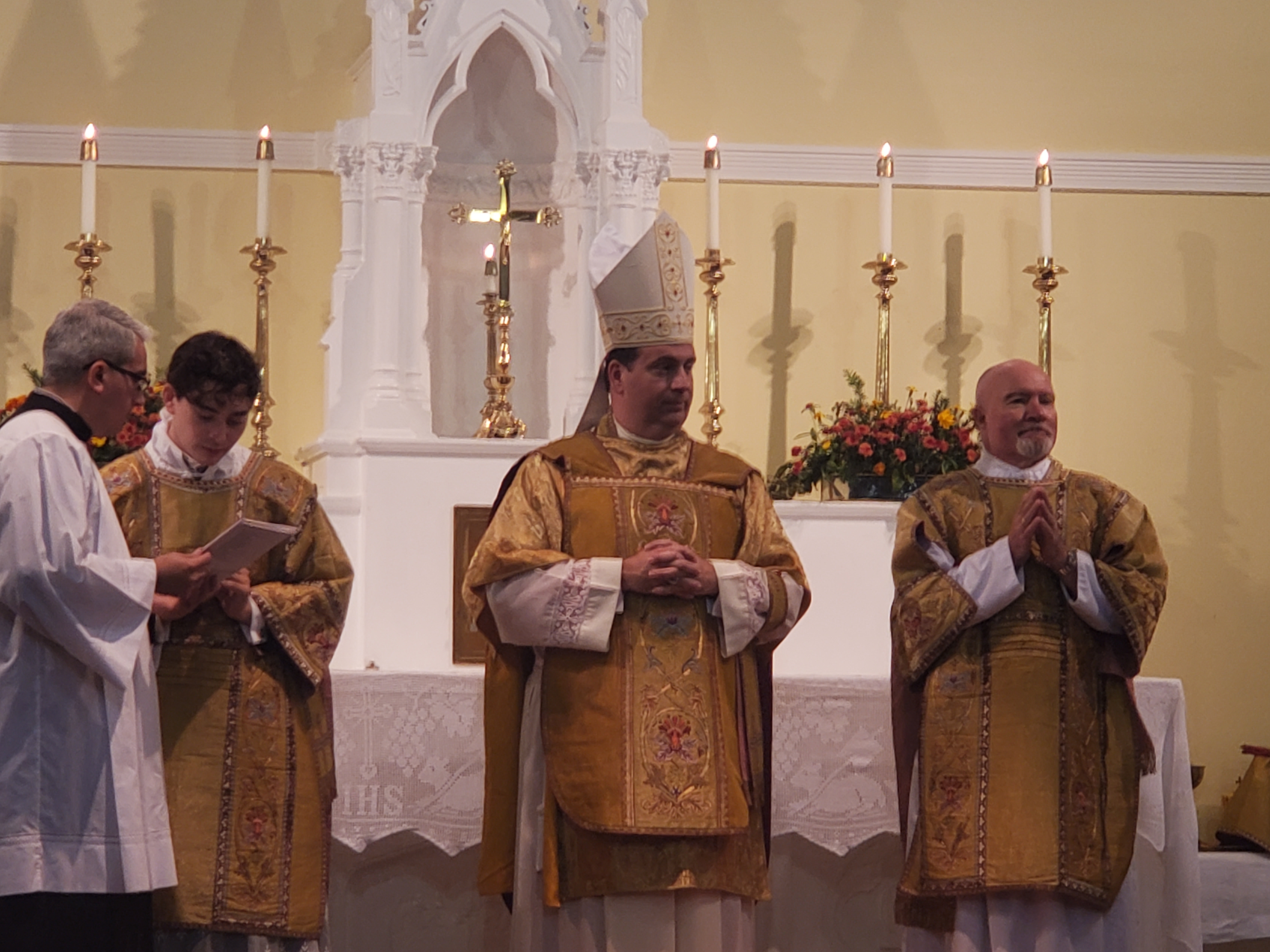
Lopes at the end of a Solemn Pontifical Divine Worship liturgy

On November 24, 2015, the Holy See announced that Pope Francis had appointed Lopes as the first bishop of the Personal Ordinariate of the Chair of Saint Peter, a church structure for Catholics in the US and Canada who were mostly formerly Anglicans. This announcement coincided with the first Sunday on which the ordinariates began celebrating Mass using Divine Worship: The Missal, developed while Lopes was serving on the Anglicanae Traditiones commission in Rome. As ordinary, Lopes succeeded Jeffrey N. Steenson, a former Episcopal bishop appointed by Pope Benedict XVI in 2012.

On February 2, 2016, Lopes was consecrated a bishop in Houston and took canonical possession of the ordinariate. His principal consecrator was Cardinal Gerhard Ludwig Müller, with Cardinal William Levada and Cardinal Donald Wuerl as co-consecrators. He is the first bishop to lead any of the three ordinariates, with the other two being led by a priest as their ordinary. In November 2021, he was elected chairman of the USCCB's Committee on Divine Worship. In June 2024, he was a principal co-consecrator of David Waller, the first bishop-ordinary of the UK's Personal Ordinariate of Our Lady of Walsingham.

On May 11, 2026, Pope Leo XIV named Lopes as apostolic administrator of the Personal Ordinariate of Our Lady of the Southern Cross, the ordinariate serving former Anglicans in Australia and Asia.

Catholic Church titles
Preceded by Jeffrey N. Steenson as Ordinary	Bishop of the Personal Ordinariate of the Chair of Saint Peter; February 2, 2016 – present	Incumbent
Preceded by Anthony Randazzo as Administrator	Apostolic Administrator of the Personal Ordinariate of Our Lady of the Southern Cross; May 11, 2026 – present	Incumbent
