= Personal Ordinariate of Our Lady of the Southern Cross =

Catholic jurisdiction structure

Personal Ordinariate of Our Lady of the Southern Cross Ordinariatus Personalis Dominae Nostrae Crucis Australis

Location
- Country: Australia; Guam; Japan; New Zealand; Philippines
- Ecclesiastical province: Immediately subject to the Holy See

Statistics
- Parishes: 17
- Members: 1,200 (2021)

Information
- Denomination: Catholic Church
- Sui iuris church: Latin Church
- Rite: Anglican Use (Divine Worship) of the Roman Rite
- Established: 15 June 2012
- Cathedral: Ordinariate Parish of St Bede the Venerable, Sydney
- Patron saint: Augustine of Canterbury
- Secular priests: 19

Current leadership
- Pope: Leo XIV
- Apostolic Administrator: Steven J. Lopes

Website
- www.ordinariate.org.au

The Personal Ordinariate of Our Lady of the Southern Cross is a personal ordinariate of the Latin Church of the Catholic Church primarily within the territory of the Australian Catholic Bishops' Conference. It is organised to serve groups of Anglicans who desire full communion with the Catholic Church in Australia and Asia. Personal ordinariates, like military ordinariates and military dioceses, are immediately subject to the Holy See in Rome. The motto of the ordinariate is Mea Gloria Fides (My Faith is my Glory). The current apostolic administrator is Steven J. Lopes, who succeeded the third ordinary, Anthony Randazzo, in 2026.

== Structure ==
A personal ordinariate established under the apostolic constitution Anglicanorum coetibus is canonically equivalent to a diocese. The faithful of the ordinariate are led by an ordinary. The ordinary may be either a bishop, if celibate, or priest, if married.

The ordinary of a personal ordinariate is the equivalent to a diocesan bishop and thus wears the same ecclesiastical attire and uses the same pontifical insignia (mitre, crosier, pectoral cross and episcopal ring) as a diocesan bishop, even if not a bishop.

== History ==
In the first decade of the 21st century, a number of bishops from the Church of England and the Traditional Anglican Communion (TAC), a global "continuing Anglican" body, independently approached the Vatican seeking some manner of corporate reunion which would preserve their autonomy and their ecclesial structure within the Catholic Church. Pope Benedict XVI promulgated an apostolic constitution, Anglicanorum coetibus, permitting the erection of personal ordinariates equivalent to dioceses, on 4 November 2009. The Vatican subsequently erected three ordinariates: the Personal Ordinariate of Our Lady of Walsingham in the territory of the episcopal conference of England and Wales on 15 January 2011, the Personal Ordinariate of the Chair of Saint Peter in the territory of the United States Conference of Catholic Bishops (USCCB) on 1 January 2012 and the Personal Ordinariate of Our Lady of the Southern Cross in the territory of the Australian Conference of Catholic Bishops on 15 June 2012.

The decree erecting the Personal Ordinariate of the Southern Cross designated the Church of Saints Ninian and Chad in Perth as the principal church of the ordinariate, which fulfills the same role as the cathedral church of a diocese. This church building previously housed a congregation of the Anglican Catholic Church in Australia (ACCA), the Australian province of the Traditional Anglican Communion (TAC). Pope Benedict XVI concurrently appointed Harry Entwistle, a former bishop of the ACCA who received ordination as a presbyter of the Catholic Church on the same day, as the first ordinary. As of July 2019, the ordinariate had 18 congregations throughout Australia and Japan.

The ordinariate announced that the Church of Torres Strait, previously a separate ecclesiastical province of the TAC, was coming into the ordinariate substantially intact and was going to form a territorial deanery in that region. However, the Church of Torres Strait later decided not to join the ordinariate. One parish on Dauan Island separately decided to join the ordinariate and a former priest of the Church of Torres Strait was ordained as a transitional deacon in June 2018 by Bishop James Foley of Cairns.

On 26 March 2019, Pope Francis accepted the resignation of the first ordinary, Harry Entwistle, after he reached retirement age. Carl Reid, until then the dean of the Deanery of St John the Baptist in Canada, within the Personal Ordinariate of the Chair of St Peter, was appointed as the second ordinary. Reid was installed on 27 August 2019.

On 21 April 2023, Pope Francis accepted the resignation of the second ordinary, Carl Reid, and appointed Anthony Randazzo, Bishop of Broken Bay, as the apostolic administrator of the ordinariate effective 1 July 2023.

== Communities ==
=== Australia ===
Since its inception, the ordinariate has grown to include 14 Australian congregations in the 5 mainland states. One religious brother in Tasmania is also a member.

=== Guam ===
One ordinariate parish currently exists in Guam.

=== Japan ===
The ordinariate has also begun to form in Japan, where it currently has two congregations. In February 2015, a congregation of the Traditional Anglican Church of Japan was received as the Ordinariate Community of St Augustine of Canterbury in Tokyo, the first ordinariate community in Asia. In June 2016, another priest was ordained for the Ordinariate Community of St Laurence of Canterbury in Hiroshima.

=== Elsewhere ===
A small number of interested individuals in New Zealand and the Philippines are considering forming communities.

== Congregations ==
The ordinariate has 17 congregations across Australia, Japan and Oceania.

Australia

- Parish of St Bede the Venerable, Sydney
- Parish of St Gregory the Great, Hunter / Newcastle
- Parish of St Ambrose, Central Coast
- Illawarra
- Parish of Saint Thomas à Becket, Brisbane
- Parish of Saint Stephen, Gold Coast
- Parish of Our Lady of Walsingham, Rockhampton
- Parish of Saint Clare, Cairns
- Parish of St John Henry Newman, Adelaide
- Tasmania
- Parish of Saint Benedict, Caulfield, Melbourne
- Parish of Saint Edmund Campion, Mentone, Melbourne
- Gippsland
- Parish of Saint Ninian and St Chad, Perth

Japan

- Parish of St Augustine of Canterbury, Tokyo
- St Laurence of Canterbury, Hiroshima

Oceania

- Santa Cruz, Guam

== Leadership ==
The following clergy have served as head of the personal ordinariate:

No.	Picture	Name	Position	Date installed	Term ended	Term of office	Reason for term end	Coat-of-arms
1		Monsignor Harry Entwistle	Ordinary	15 June 2012	27 August 2019	7 years, 73 days	Retired	
2		Monsignor Carl Reid	Ordinary	27 August 2019	1 July 2023	3 years, 308 days	Resigned due to impending visa expiry	
3		Bishop Anthony Randazzo	Apostolic Administrator	1 July 2023	11 May 2026	2 years, 314 days	Appointed prefect of the Dicastery for Legislative Texts	
4		Bishop Steven J. Lopes	Apostolic Administrator	11 May 2026	present	43 days	incumbent	

== See also ==
- Anglican Communion
- Anglican realignment
- Anglican–Roman Catholic dialogue
- Anglo-Catholicism
- List of Anglican bishops who converted to Roman Catholicism
