= Anglicanorum coetibus =

Apostolic constitution by Benedict XVI

Anglicanorum coetibus Latin for 'Groups of Anglicans' Apostolic constitution of Pope Benedict XVI
- Signature date: 4 November 2009
- Subject: Official establishment of personal ordinariates for former Anglicans
- Text: In Latin
- AAS: 12 (2009): 985–990

Anglicanorum coetibus ("Groups of Anglicans") is an apostolic constitution written by Pope Benedict XVI on 4 November 2009 and promulgated the same day by the Holy See in Latin, English, and Italian, which regulates the establishment of personal ordinariates for former Anglicans converting to the Roman Catholic Church. At the same time, 14 articles that contain supplementary norms for the constitution were issued by the Congregation for the Doctrine of the Faith. The document replaced the Pastoral Provision in effect in the United States since 1980. The constitution is divided into 13 points that contains the justification for its enactment and a part that contains the norms that are to apply to the personal ordinariates.

== Basic standards ==
The basis for admission is the profession of faith as described in the Catechism of the Catholic Church. Chapter I contains provisions for the establishment of personal ordinariates for former Anglicans who wish to enter into full communion with the Roman Catholic Church. The Anglican personal ordinariates under the Congregation for the Doctrine of the Faith will be established alongside the existing, but territorially defined Roman Catholic dioceses. So they are not part of a diocese, but rather legally independent subchurches. In every area of a bishops' conference, one or more ordinariates can be established. The ordinariates possess legal personality and are comparable in their constitution to a regular diocese.

Each ordinariate consists of the laity, clergy, and members of religious orders and societies of apostolic life who have previously belonged to the Church of England and the broader Anglican Communion, and now wish to be in full communion with the Roman Catholic Church, as well as those who have received the sacraments of initiation (i.e., baptism, confirmation, and communion) within these ordinariates.

== Liturgy ==
The personal ordinariates are self-governing in accordance with the provisions of the Roman Catholic canon law and the apostolic constitution Anglicanorum coetibus, and are subject to the Congregation for the Doctrine of the Faith and the other congregations of the Roman Curia according to their respective areas of competence (Section II). The ordinariates may use their own liturgical books from the Anglican tradition that have been approved by the Holy See (such as the Book of Common Prayer), and celebrate the Eucharist, the other sacraments, and the Liturgy of the Hours according to them. The celebration of the Roman Rite (Rituale Romanum) is not excluded (Section III AC).

Each ordinariate is headed by an Ordinary, a pastor responsible for the ordinariate, appointed by the Pope. He must be a bishop or priest and has ordinary jurisdiction, which he exercises on behalf of the Pope (vicariously) and which is limited to the respective members of the ordinariate. If necessary, he exercises his authority jointly with the diocesan bishop, whose territory his ordinariate extends over. He is a member of the respective episcopal conference and subject to its directives (Article 2 of the Supplementary Norms).

The Ordinary is assisted in the leadership role by a Governing Council, whose statutes are put into effect by the Ordinary with the consent of the Vatican. The Governing Council meets under the chairmanship of the Ordinary and consists of at least six priests. It exercises the competences of the priestly council and the diocesan consultors' college provided for in the canon law. This means that in the event of a sede vacante, the Governing Council will either lead the ordinariate or elect an administrator to lead the ordinariate during the period of vacancy. It also participates in the appointment of a new Ordinary in that it sends the Apostolic See a list of three candidates (Article 4 § 1 of the Supplementary Norms).

== Access to the sacraments ==
All former Anglican deacons, priests, and bishops who are not subject to any canonical irregularity or other impediment may be admitted by the Ordinary as candidates for ordination in the Roman Catholic Church. Former Roman Catholic clerics who have converted to the Anglican Church are not allowed to perform clerical services in the ordinariates (Article 6 § 2 of the Supplementary Norms). Unmarried candidates must take a vow of celibacy (Section VI § 1 AC); hence, the ordination of married men to the episcopacy is excluded.

In the case of the ordination of former Anglican clergymen who are already married, the norms established in the encyclical Sacerdotalis caelibatus, written by Pope Paul VI and issued on June 24, 1967, and the declaration of the Congregation for the Doctrine of the Faith of April 1, 1981 apply. If other married men are to receive ordination as Roman Catholic priests, the ordinary must submit a corresponding request to the Apostolic See (Article 6 § 1 of the Supplementary Norms).

== Clergy ==
The Roman Catholic Church expressly excludes "those Christian communities born out of the Protestant Reformation of the sixteenth century", since, according to the Roman Catholic doctrine, these communities do not enjoy apostolic succession in the sacrament of ordination, and therefore lack a constitutive element of the Church. This includes the Church of England and the broader Anglican Communion, the validity of whose orders the Roman Catholic Church has declared "absolutely null and utterly void". This judgement was officially enunciated in the papal bull Apostolicae curae of 1896 by Pope Leo XIII, which confirmed all Anglican ordinations to be invalid.

=== Former Anglican bishops ===
Married men who served as former Anglican bishops can be appointed as Ordinaries of the personal ordinariates. In this case, he receives the priestly ordination and can exercise full jurisdiction through the ordinariate (Article 11 § 1 of the Supplementary Norms). Former Anglican bishops who have joined a personal ordinariate can be appointed to assist the Ordinary in the administration of the ordinariate. They can also ask the Apostolic See for permission to use the episcopal insignia.

=== Competencies of the Ordinary ===
With the consent of the Apostolic See, the Ordinary, like any diocesan bishop, can establish religious orders and societies of apostolic life. Institutes and communities that transfer from the Church of England and the broader Anglican Communion to a personal ordinariate of the Roman Catholic Church can be placed under his jurisdiction. Like every bishop of a diocese, the Ordinary has the duty to appear in Rome every five years for an ad limina visit to the Vatican.

Former Anglican clergymen and laymen who have been ordained as Roman Catholic priests and are serving in the personal ordinariates have all the rights that an ordinary diocesan priest has. They are incardinated in the ordinariate and thus have a right to corresponding support, which the Ordinary must ensure (Article 7 § 1 of the Supplementary Norms). Furthermore, after consulting the diocesan bishop, the Ordinary can establish personal parishes with the consent of the Apostolic See.

The priests of the ordinariate can be elected to the diocese's council of priests, and priests and deacons can also be members of the diocesan pastoral council (Article 8 of the Supplementary Norms). If pastoral care requires it, the clergy of the ordinariate should also assist in the pastoral care of the diocese. In this case, they are subject to the respective diocesan bishop.

=== Judiciary ===
According to the norms of Anglicanorum coetibus, on January 15th, 2011, the Personal Ordinariate of Our Lady of Walsingham for the United Kingdom, on January 1st, 2012, the Personal Ordinariate of the Chair of Saint Peter for the United States, and on the 15th In June 2012, the Personal Ordinariate of Our Lady of the Southern Cross for Australia were established. On March 19th, 2019, the Congregation for the Doctrine of the Faith issued the latest supplementary norms for Anglicanorum coetibus.

The responsible court is the diocesan court in which the two parties to the dispute reside, unless the personal ordinariate has established its own court. In this case, the Ordinary is to designate a court of second instance; the designation is to be approved by the Apostolic See. The transfer of Anglican laypeople, clergymen, religious orders, and societies from the Church of England and the broader Anglican Communion to a personal ordinariate of the Roman Catholic Church must be documented by a written declaration (Section IX. AC).

== See also ==
- Anglo-Catholicism
  - List of Anglican bishops who converted to Roman Catholicism
- Catholic–Protestant relations
  - Anglican–Roman Catholic dialogue
  - Catholic–Lutheran dialogue
  - Counter-Reformation
  - English Reformation
  - Ritualism in the Church of England
- Catholic missions
- Catholic Church in the United Kingdom
  - Catholic Church in England and Wales
  - Catholic Church in Northern Ireland
  - Catholic Church in Scotland
- Evangelical Catholicism
- Holy orders in the Catholic Church
  - Clerical celibacy in the Catholic Church
- Liturgical Movement
- Lutheran Mariology
- Oxford Movement
- Personal prelature

== Bibliography ==
- Brand, Clinton Allen (2018). "Very Members Incorporate: Reflections on the Sacral Language of Divine Worship". In Lang, Uwe Michael (ed.). The Fullness of Divine Worship: The Sacred Liturgy and its Renewal. Harrogate, North Yorkshire, Toronto, Ontario, and Washington, D.C.: Catholic University of America Press. pp. 197–222. doi:10.2307/j.ctv6q534m.11. ISBN 9780813231402.
- De Mey, Peter (2016). "De Oecumenismo Catholico et de Opere Conversionum: The Relationship between Ecumenism and the Apostolate of Conversions before and during Vatican II". In Van Erp, Stephan; Schelkens, Karim (eds.). Conversion and Church: The Challenge of Ecclesial Renewal. Brill's Studies in Catholic Theology. Vol. 2. Leiden and Boston: Brill Publishers. pp. 263–287. doi:10.1163/9789004319165_016. ISBN 978-90-04-31916-5. LCCN 2016015093.
- Waddell, Richard (2021). "The Anglican Patrimony in Anglicanorum Coetibus and the Complementary Norms". In Rowland, Tracey (ed.). The Anglican Patrimony in Catholic Communion: The Gift of the Ordinariates. Dublin, London, and New York: T&T Clark. pp. 23–44. ISBN 9780567700148. LCCN 2020054405.
