= Missal =

Liturgical book

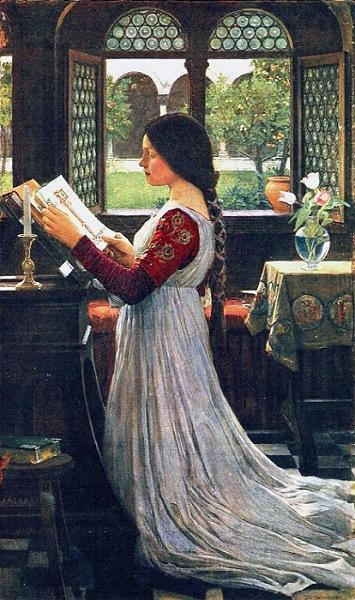
The Missal, a 1902 portrait by John William Waterhouse

A missal is a liturgical book containing instructions and texts necessary for the celebration of Mass throughout the liturgical year. Versions differ across liturgical tradition, period, and purpose, with some missals intended to enable a priest to celebrate Mass publicly and others for private and lay use. The texts of the most common Eucharistic liturgy in the world, the Catholic Church's Mass of Paul VI of the Roman Rite, are contained in the 1970 edition of the Roman Missal.

Missals have also been published for earlier forms of the Roman Rite and other Latin liturgical rites. Other liturgical books typically contain the Eucharistic liturgies of other ritual traditions, but missals exist for the Byzantine Rites, Eastern Orthodox Western Rites, Lutheran and Anglican liturgies.

== History ==
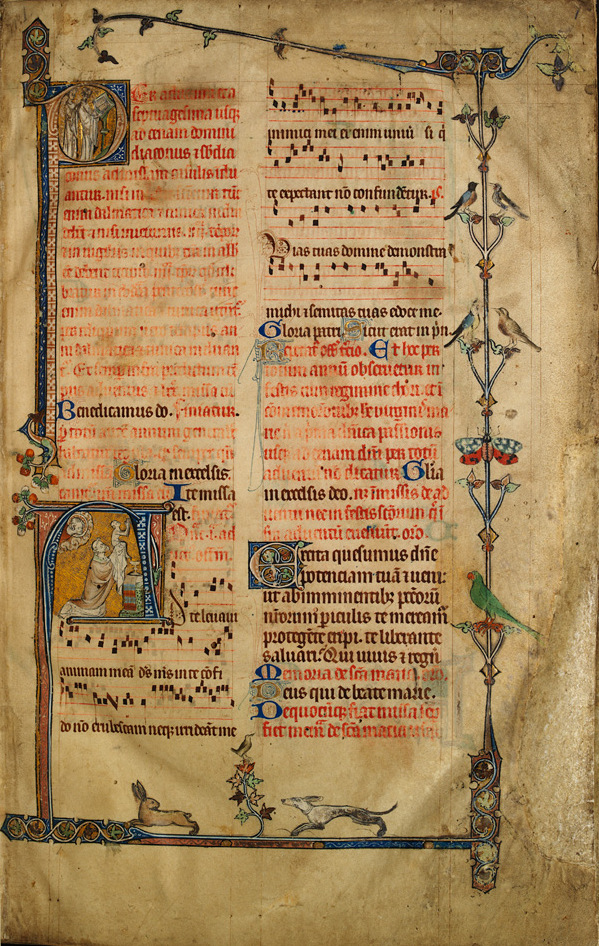
A page from the Sherbrooke Missal, one of the earliest surviving missals written in English

Before the compilation of such books, several books were used when celebrating Mass. These included the gradual (texts mainly from the Psalms, with musical notes added), the evangelary or gospel book, the epistolary with texts from other parts of the New Testament, mainly the epistles (letters) of Saint Paul, and the sacramentary with the prayers that the priest himself said.

In high medieval times, when it had become common in the West for priests to say Mass without the assistance of a choir and other ministers, these books began to be combined into a "Mass book" (missale in Latin), for the priest's use alone. This led to the appearance of the missale plenum ("full or complete missal"), which contained all the texts of the Mass, but without the music of the choir parts. Indications of the rubrics to be followed were also added.

=== Latin Catholicism ===
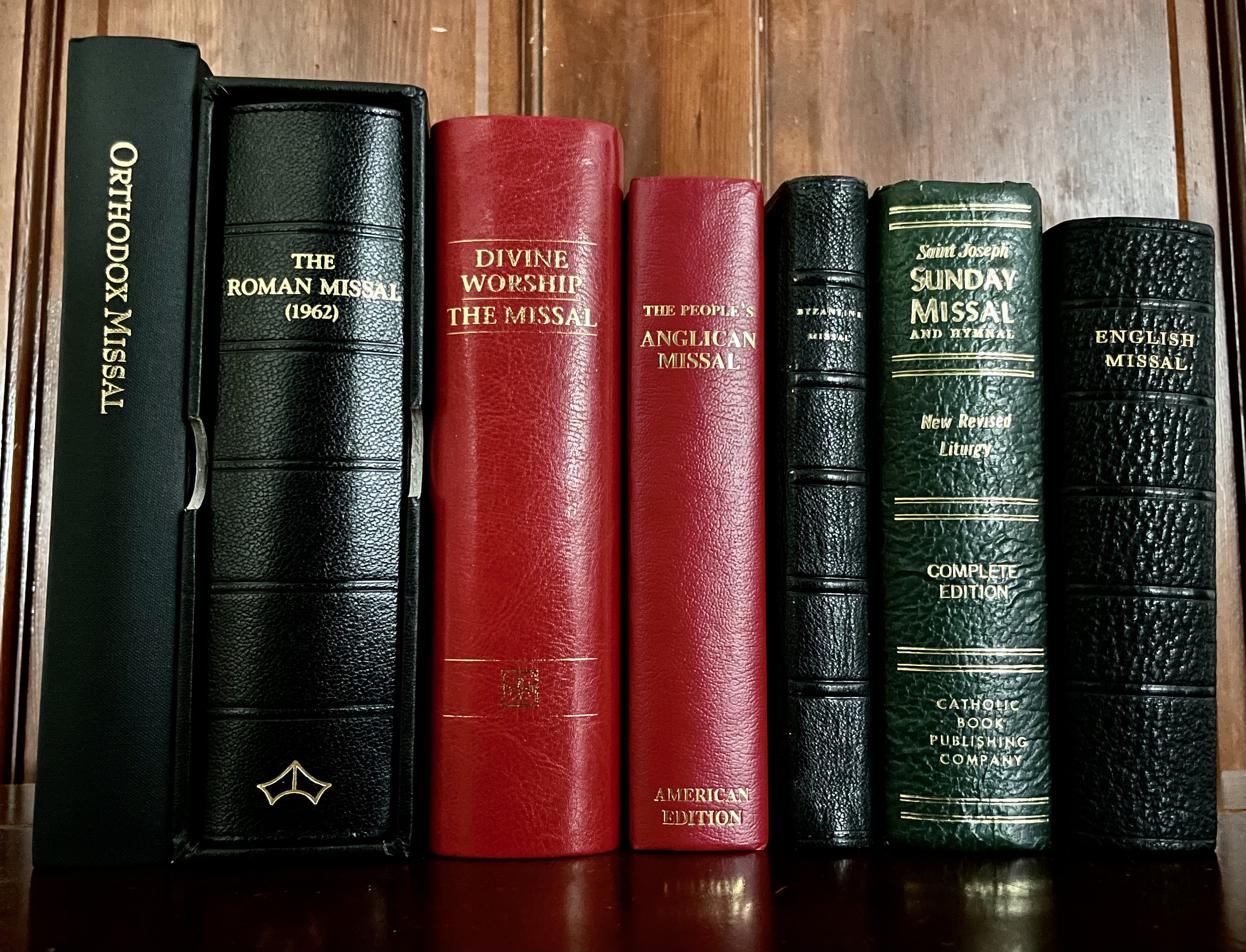
Seven missals from various liturgical families and denominations

The Roman Missal (Missale Romanum), published by Pope Pius V in 1570, eventually replaced the widespread use of different missal traditions by different parts of the church, such as those of Troyes, Sarum (Salisbury), and others. Many episcopal sees had some local prayers and feast days in addition.

At the behest of the Second Vatican Council, Pope Paul VI greatly increased the amount of Sacred Scripture read at Mass and, to a lesser extent, the prayer formulas. This necessitated a return to having the Scripture readings in a separate book, known as the Lectionary. A separate Book of the Gospels, with texts extracted from the Lectionary, is recommended, but is not obligatory. The Roman Missal continues to include elaborate rubrics, as well as antiphons etc., which were not in sacramentaries.

The first complete official translation of the Roman Missal into English appeared in 1973, based on the text of 1970. On 28 March 2001, the Holy See issued the Instruction Liturgiam authenticam. This included the requirement that, in translations of the liturgical texts from the official Latin originals, "the original text, insofar as possible, must be translated integrally and in the most exact manner, without omissions or additions in terms of their content, and without paraphrases or glosses. Any adaptation to the characteristics or the nature of the various vernacular languages is to be sober and discreet." The following year, the third typical edition (Note: The "typical edition" of a liturgical text is that to which editions by other publishers must conform.) of the revised Roman Missal in Latin was released.

=== Lutheranism ===
In Europe, the Lutheran Missal was printed in 1525, in Livonian, Latvian, and Estonian.

The development of a Lutheran Missal in the English language is currently underway.

=== Anglicanism ===
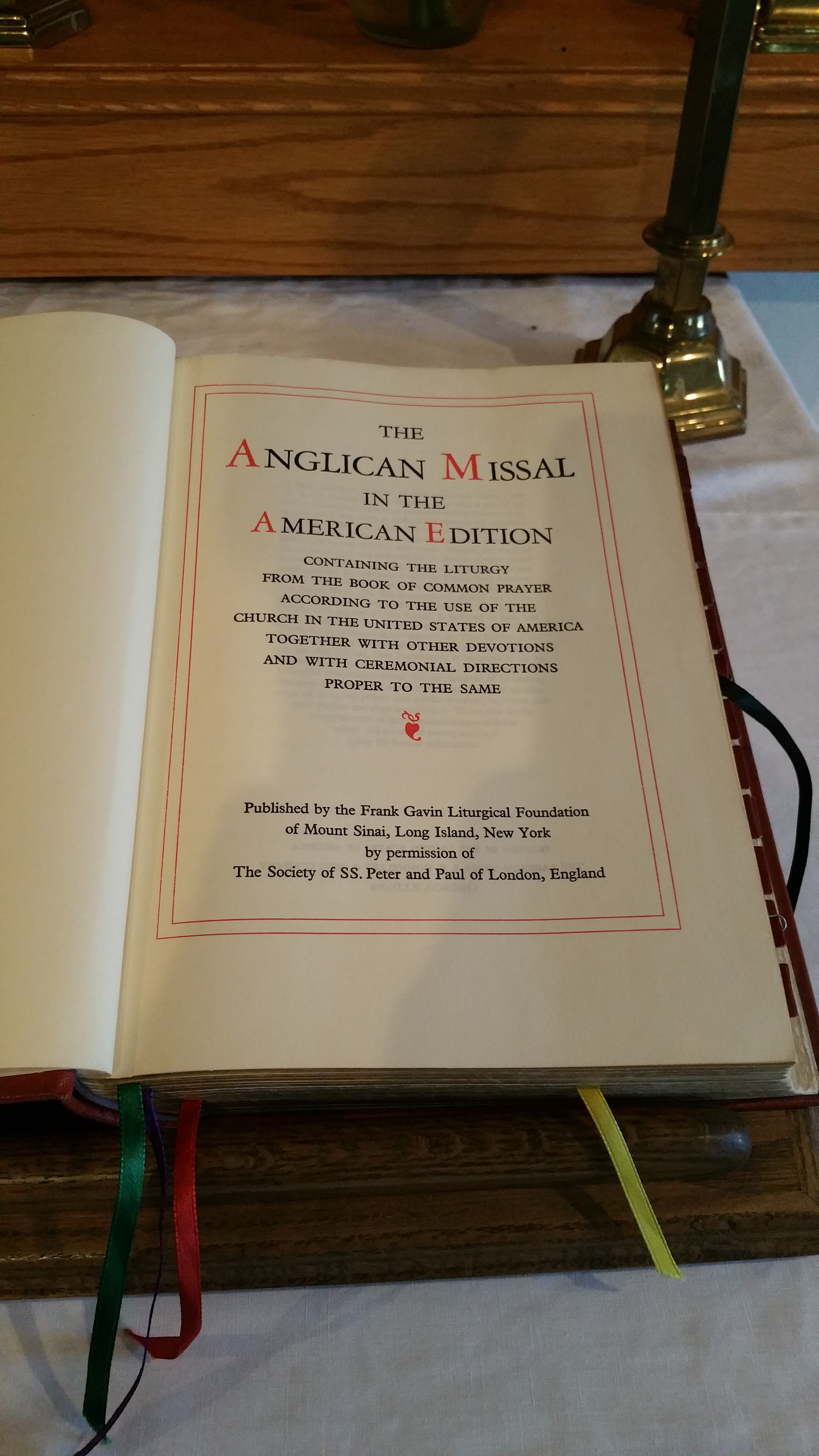
The Anglican Missal sitting on an altar desk in an Anglican parish church

Prior to the Reformation, liturgical practice had featured usage of local cathedral missal variations. The most noted of these was the Sarum Use missal, but others including the Durham Use missal influenced English liturgical practice. During the English Reformation, the Church of England separated from the Catholic Church. Characteristic of Protestant liturgy trends, the Church of England opted to utilize a vernacular liturgy. Thomas Cranmer is traditionally credited with leading the production of new liturgical texts, including the 1549 Book of Common Prayer. The 1549 prayer book and successive versions of the Book of Common Prayer would replace both missals and breviaries in regular Anglican liturgical practice.

As the Anglican tradition broadened to include modern anglo-catholicism, some Anglicans sought a return to a missal pattern for their liturgical books. In 1921, the Society of Saints Peter and Paul published the Anglican Missal in Great Britain. The Frank Gavin Liturgical Foundation of Mount Sinai published a revised edition in 1961 and the Anglican Parishes Association continues to print it:

The first edition of the Anglican Missal was published in London by the Society of Saints Peter and Paul in 1921; the first American edition appeared in 1943, published by the Frank Gavin Liturgical Foundation of Mount Sinai, Long Island, N.Y., and in 1947 a revised edition was published (reprinted in 1961); the publication rights were given (or sold) to the Anglican Parishes Association in the 1970s, which reprinted the 1947 edition.

== Sections and illumination ==
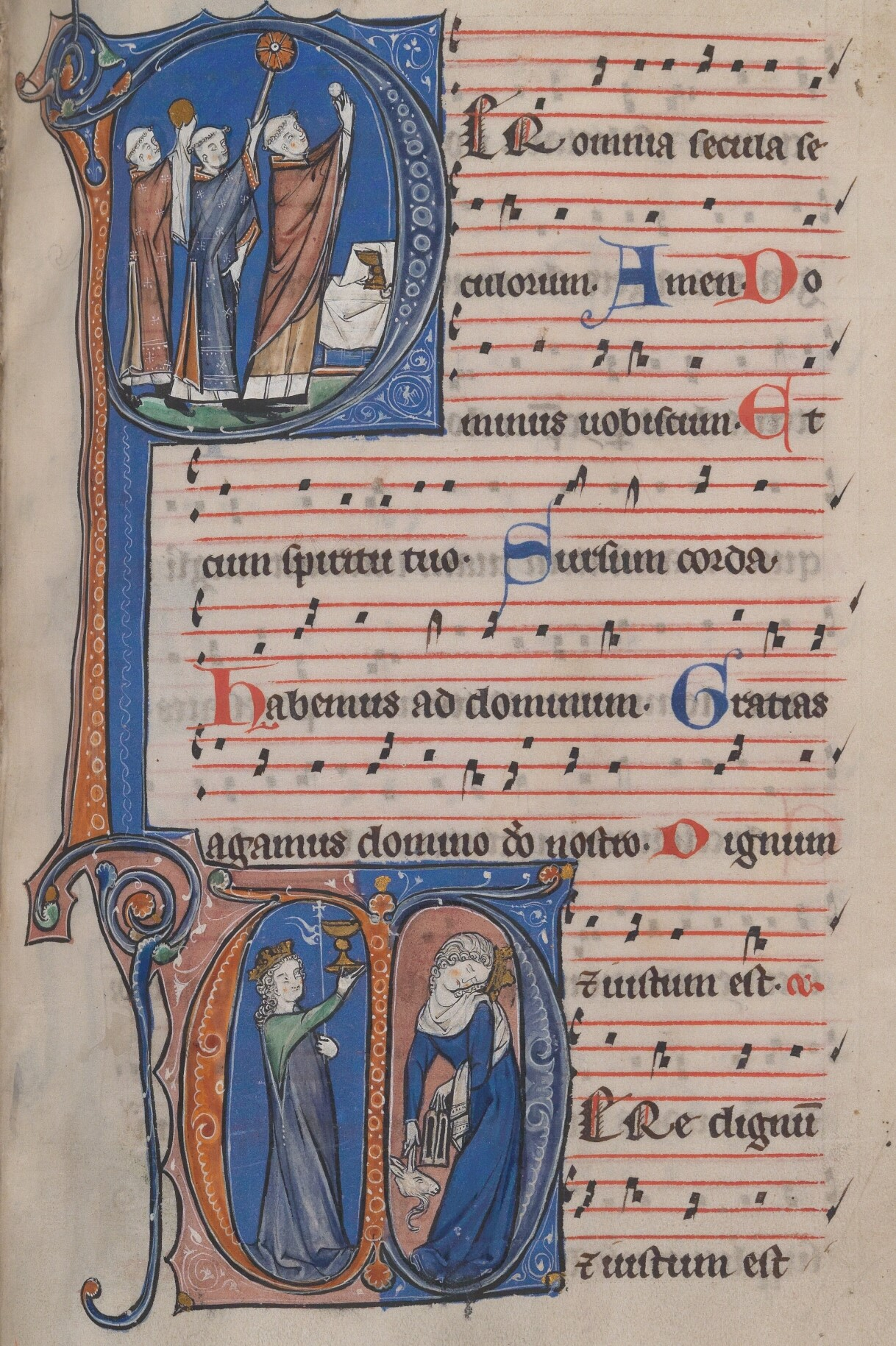
An excerpt from the Missal of the Sint-Pieters abbey (Ghent), manufactured in the 13th century and preserved in Ghent University Library

In France, missals begin to be illuminated from the beginning of the 13th century. At this time, the missal was normally divided into several parts: calendar, temporal, preface and Canon of the Mass, sanctoral, votive Masses and various additions. Two principal parts of the missal are the temporal and sanctoral. The temporal contains texts for the Mass, day by day for the whole liturgical year, organized around Christmas and Easter. The sanctoral presents a liturgical year through the commemoration of saints. Finally, votive Masses (a Mass for a specific purpose or read with a specific intent by the priest), different prayers, new feasts, commemoration of recent saints and canonizations were usually placed at the end of the missal.

Iconographic analysis of the missals of the Diocese of Paris from the 13th-14th centuries shows the use of certain traditional images as well as some changing motifs. Among the former group, some types of initials, including the introit to the First Sunday of Advent; to the preface of the Mass for Holy Week; to the Masses for saints, containing their images, but also the rich illumination of two pages of the missal in full size: the Crucifixion of Jesus and Christ in Majesty. The second group with changing scenes include some images of the clergy that are not depicted in all missals, but can be a repeating motif pertaining to only one manuscript. This can be the priest at prayer, the priest elevating the host (sacramental bread), monks in song and so forth.

Catholic missals after the Second Vatican Council (1962−1965) are only little illustrated, at least before 2002, mostly with black-and-white pictures. Since 2005, many editions of the Editio typica tertia of the Roman Missal have been illustrated in colour, especially in the English-speaking world.

== Missalettes ==
The term "missal" is also used for books intended for use not by the priest but by others assisting at Mass or the service of worship. These books are sometimes referred to as "hand missals" or "missalettes", while the term "altar missal" is sometimes used to distinguish the missal for the priest's use from them. Usually they omit or severely abbreviate the rubrical portions and Mass texts for other than the regular yearly celebrations, but include the Scripture readings.

One such missal has been used for the swearing in of a United States President. After the assassination of President John F. Kennedy, Lyndon B. Johnson was sworn in as the nation's 36th president aboard Air Force One using a missal of the late President.

== See also ==
=== Missals ===
- Missale Aboense
- Anglican Missal
- Aromanian Missal
- Missal of Arbuthnott
- Beauvais Missal
- Roman Missal
- Missal of Silos

=== Other articles ===
- Rubricarum Instructum
- Sacramentary
- Customary (liturgy)
- Roman Breviary
- Anglican Breviary
