= Anglican Papalism =

Subset of Anglo-Catholicism

Anglican Papalism, also referred to as Anglo-Papalism, is a subset of Anglo-Catholicism with adherents manifesting a particularly high degree of influence from, and even identification with, the Roman Catholic Church. This position has historically been referred to as Anglican Papalism; the term Anglo-Papalism is an American neologism and it seems not to have appeared in print prior to the 1990s. Anglican Papalists have suggested "that the only way to convert England is by means of an 'English Uniate' rite". Anglican Papalists have historically practiced praying the Dominican rosary, among other Marian devotions, Corpus Christi procession, as well as the reservation of and Benediction of the Blessed Sacrament.

== Origins ==
The origins of "Anglican-Papalism", as it was then termed, lie in the writings of Spencer Jones, vicar of Moreton-in-Marsh, and Lewis T. Wattson, an American who became an Anglican Franciscan friar. Both men were active around the turn of the twentieth century. Other important figures in the early movement include Lord Halifax, who consistently remained more optimistic than most as to the likelihood of reunion with Rome.

Later adherents of the tradition include Henry Fynes-Clinton, Dom Gregory Dix and Hugh Ross Williamson.

Some Anglican religious communities were Anglican Papalist, prominent among them the Benedictines of Dix's Nashdom Abbey, who used the Roman Missal and monastic breviary in Latin.

== Beliefs and practices ==
Anglican Papalists regard the Pope as the earthly leader of the Christian Church. They generally accept in full all the Ecumenical Councils recognised by the Catholic Church, including the Councils of Trent and the First Vatican Council, along with nearly all subsequent definitions of doctrine, including the bodily Assumption of Mary and her Immaculate Conception. There are Anglican Papalists who are in communion with the Church of England who reject the Second Vatican Council for the same reasons many traditionalist Catholics do; sedevacantist groups, in particular, reject the Vatican II council.

Most Anglo-Catholics regard the English Reformation as an act of the Church of England repudiating papal authority. They usually regarded Archbishop Thomas Cranmer as more of a translator than as a theologian, and saw the service in the first Book of Common Prayer as being the Mass in English. Anglo-Papalists, on the other hand, regard the Church of England as two provinces of the Catholic Church's Latin Church (the Province of Canterbury and the Province of York) forcibly severed from the rest by an act of the English Crown. In his defence of Anglican orders, Gregory Dix speaks of Cranmer and his associates using the power of the English state to impose their views on the church by Act of Parliament. Anglican Papalists therefore regard the Book of Common Prayer as having only the authority of custom, and believe it is legitimate to use the Roman Missal and Breviary for their worship.

Like many other Anglo-Catholics, Anglican Papalists make use of the rosary, Benediction of the Blessed Sacrament and other Catholic devotions. Some have regarded Thomas Cranmer as a heretic and his second Prayer Book as an expression of Zwinglian doctrine (as did Gregory Dix in his pamphlet "Dixit Cranmer et non Timuit"). They have actively worked for the reunion of the Church of England with the Holy See, as the logical objective of the Oxford Movement. In 1908, they began the "Church Unity Octave of Prayer", the precursor of the much more general "Week of Prayer for Christian Unity".

=== Liturgy ===
The English Missal has been widely used by Anglican Papalists. This volume, which is still in print, contains a form of the Tridentine Mass in English interspersed with sections of the Book of Common Prayer. The Roman Catholic writer Fr. Adrian Fortescue's Ceremonies of the Roman Rite Described served as a useful guide as to how to use the missal. At early celebrations, some Anglican Papalist priests would use only the Roman Missal, in Latin or in English translation. Many modern Anglo-Papalists use the modern Catholic rite of Mass in English.

Some Anglican Papalist parishes advocate "corporate worship in the Latin tongue".

== Groups and publications ==
Anglican Papalists have established a variety of organisations, including the Catholic League and the Society for Promoting Catholic Unity (SPCU), which published The Pilot. They have also provided the leadership in many more general Anglo-Catholic organisations such as the Annunciation Group. Other Anglican Papalist groups include the Sodality of the Precious Blood. Priests of the sodality commit themselves to recitation of the modern Roman Liturgy of the Hours and to the Latin Rite discipline of celibate chastity. The now-defunct Society of SS. Peter and Paul published the Anglican Missal.

In the 1950s the Fellowship of Christ the Eternal Priest, which was established for Anglican ordinands in the armed forces, published a journal called The Rock, which was strongly pro-Roman. Few copies remain as it consisted of cyclostyled sheets.

== Personal ordinariates ==
On 9 November 2009, Pope Benedict XVI promulgated the apostolic constitution Anglicanorum coetibus, allowing the creation of personal ordinariates that would allow Anglican clergy and faithful to reunite with the Catholic Church while preserving elements of a "distinctive Anglican patrimony".

The first Anglican ordinariate, known as the Personal Ordinariate of Our Lady of Walsingham, was established on 15 January 2011 in the United Kingdom; it has attracted large numbers of Anglican Papalists, Anglo-Catholics and Anglican clergy in opposition to the Church of England (CoE), including four Bishops of the CoE (Jonathan Michael Goodall, Michael James Nazir-Ali, John William Goddard and Peter Robert Forster). The second Anglican ordinariate, known as the Personal Ordinariate of the Chair of Saint Peter, was established on 1 January 2012 in the United States. The already existing Anglican Use parishes in the United States, which have existed since the 1980s, formed a portion of the first American Anglican ordinariate. These parishes were already in communion with Rome and use modified Anglican liturgies approved by the Holy See. They were joined by other groups and parishes of Episcopalians and some other Anglicans. A third Anglican ordinariate, known as the Personal Ordinariate of Our Lady of the Southern Cross, was established on 15 June 2012 in Australia.

== Decline ==
The Anglican Papalists waned in influence following Vatican II. Much of their ideology having centered around the preservation of the Latin Rite, they struggled to adjust their aims following liturgical reform in the Roman church.

The death knell for the movement came with the advent of women's ordination in the 1970s through 1990s. The decision to ordain women in the absence of any similar decision taken by Rome means that, as of 2025, the possibility of unification of Canterbury and Rome, once seen as a real possibility, is foreclosed for the foreseeable future.

== List of associated monasteries ==
- Nashdom Abbey
- St. Gregory's Abbey, Three Rivers

== Bibliography ==
- Gregory Dix, The Question of Anglican Orders, Dacre Press, 1944. pp. 31–32.
- Peter F Anson, The Call to the Cloister, London SPCK, 1955, pp. 183–192, 462–466, 547–548.
- Peter F Anson. Fashions in Church Furnishings 1840-1940, Faith Press, 1960, Chapters XXIX, XXX.
- Hugh Ross Williamson, The Walled Garden, Macmillan, 1957, Chapters X, XIV–XVI.
- Michael Yelton. Anglican Papalism. Canterbury Press Norwich, 2005. ISBN 1-85311-655-6.
