= Maurice Child =

Maurice Child FRGS (1884–1950) was a prominent Anglo-Catholic priest in the Church of England in the inter-war years.

Child was born in 1884 and educated at Sherborne, St John's College, Oxford, and Cuddesdon College. He was ordained by the Bishop of London in 1909.

He served curacies at St Andrew's Haverstock Hill, Kentish Town; St. Michael, Plymouth; Holy Trinity, Sloane Street; and St. Mary, Pimlico. He was a librarian at Pusey House, Oxford and General Secretary of the English Church Union. He was appointed as Rector of St Dunstan, Cranford in 1935.

At this time he was much involved with the Society of SS. Peter and Paul, a group within Anglo-Catholicism which promoted a Tridentine interpretation of the Book of Common Prayer and whose motto was "Back to Baroque". He was the author of numerous tracts published by the society, often with illustrations by Martin Travers.

Child was much travelled. In 1912 he took part in the Yale Expedition to Peru. Before the First World War he worked in South Africa, the South Sea Islands and Australasia. During the First World War he was with the British Expeditionary Force in France serving as a liaison officer. After the Armistice he was in the United States and in 1922 went to India and Burma. He also organized the first Anglican pilgrimage to the Holy Land in 1924.

A well known socialite, he was nicknamed by clerical colleagues the "Playboy of the Western Church". He died in 1950 after falling down the stairs at a friend's dinner party.
