= Martin Travers =

English church artist and designer (1886–1948)

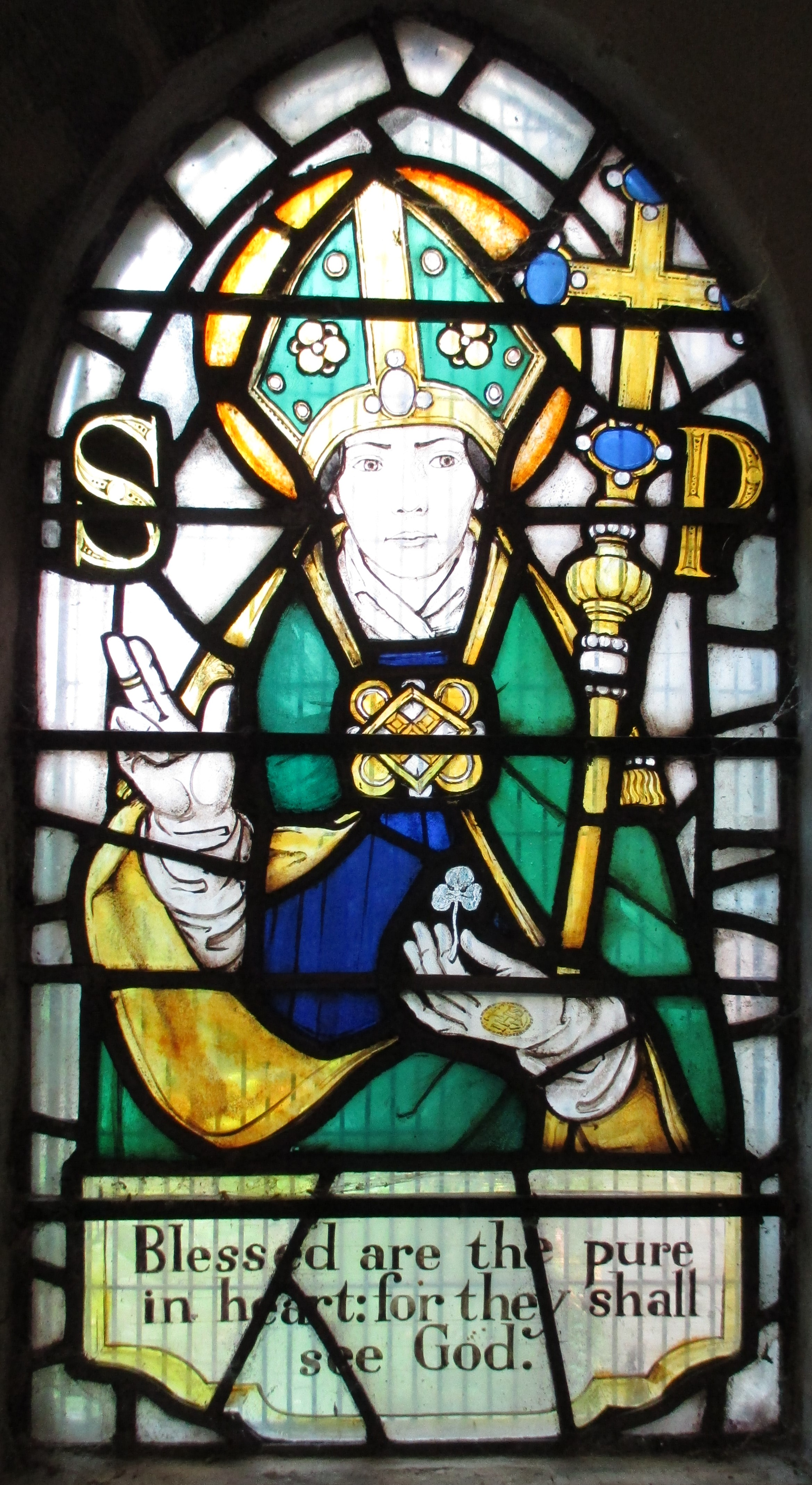
Martin Travers stained glass window of St Patrick, 1932. In the narthex of All Saints Church, Hove, East Sussex

Howard Martin Otho Travers (19 February 1886 – 25 July 1948) was a leading English church artist and designer.

Travers was born in Margate, Kent, educated at Tonbridge School, entered the Royal College of Art in 1904, and was awarded its Diploma in Architecture in 1908. At the RCA his teachers included Edward Johnston (calligraphy), William Lethaby (design), Arthur Beresford Pite (architecture), and Christopher Whall (stained glass). He worked for a time as an assistant to Ninian Comper.

As a graphic artist Travers is best known for his illustrations for publications by the Society of SS. Peter and Paul (SSPP). Perhaps his most celebrated work for SSPP, Pictures of the English Liturgy, was published in two volumes: Low Mass in 1916 and High Mass in 1922. The original drawings are displayed in St George's, Headstone, Harrow. Illustrations he produced for the Anglican Missal are included in the 2015 Roman Catholic personal ordinariates' Divine Worship: The Missal, which gives expression to Anglican Catholic patrimony.

Art historian Peter Cormack comments that Travers "translated the style of his graphic work into an urbane, eclectic idiom applicable to stained glass and several other forms of ecclesiastical decoration".

Martin Travers was one of the most influential British stained glass artists of the twentieth century. From around 1918 until 1926 he rented a studio from Lowndes & Drury at the Glass House, Fulham. Lowndes & Drury continued to cut, fire, glaze and fix his windows after he established his own studio. Travers was awarded the Grand Prix for stained glass at the 1925 International Exposition of Modern Industrial and Decorative Arts in Paris (French: Exposition internationale des Arts décoratifs et industriels modernes) – the exhibition which gave rise to the term 'Art Deco'. In the same year he was appointed chief instructor in stained glass at the Royal College of Art: a position he held until his death in London in 1948.

Regarding Whall's approach to stained glass design as over-personal, Travers developed a sophisticated, refined style which can appear at once both modern and traditional. His long-standing chief assistant John E Crawford wrote that, as features of architectural decoration, Travers' windows were designed and made to harmonise with their surroundings, and that "his glass was of no fixed period, but became one with architecture of every different period". Significant large five-light and tracery windows may be seen at St George's, Headstone, Harrow and the Great Hall of Christchurch Arts Centre (originally Canterbury College), New Zealand, installed in 1937 and 1938 respectively.

His agnosticism notwithstanding, Martin Travers' name is often connected with the Anglo-Catholic movement, especially the ultramontane wing which favoured a Baroque style of church furnishing. In the 1920s he designed and constructed a number of spectacular reredos for this constituency, often employing affordable materials such as plywood, whitewood, papier mache, embossed wallpaper, and tinted varnished foil to achieve the desired effect; which has meant that some of this work has not weathered well. The most notable examples of these furnishings are in central London: the re-fashioned reredos in St Mary's, Bourne Street, Pimlico, c. 1920, and the remarkable Art Deco Churrigueresque altarpiece in St Augustine's, Queen's Gate, South Kensington, 1927. A facet of the past glory of the Anglo-Catholic Congresses depicted by John Betjeman, Travers' stage sets included a huge triptych erected in the Royal Albert Hall in 1927: such was the "Travers baroque" under which, in those "waking days", the "Faith was taught and fanned to a golden blaze".

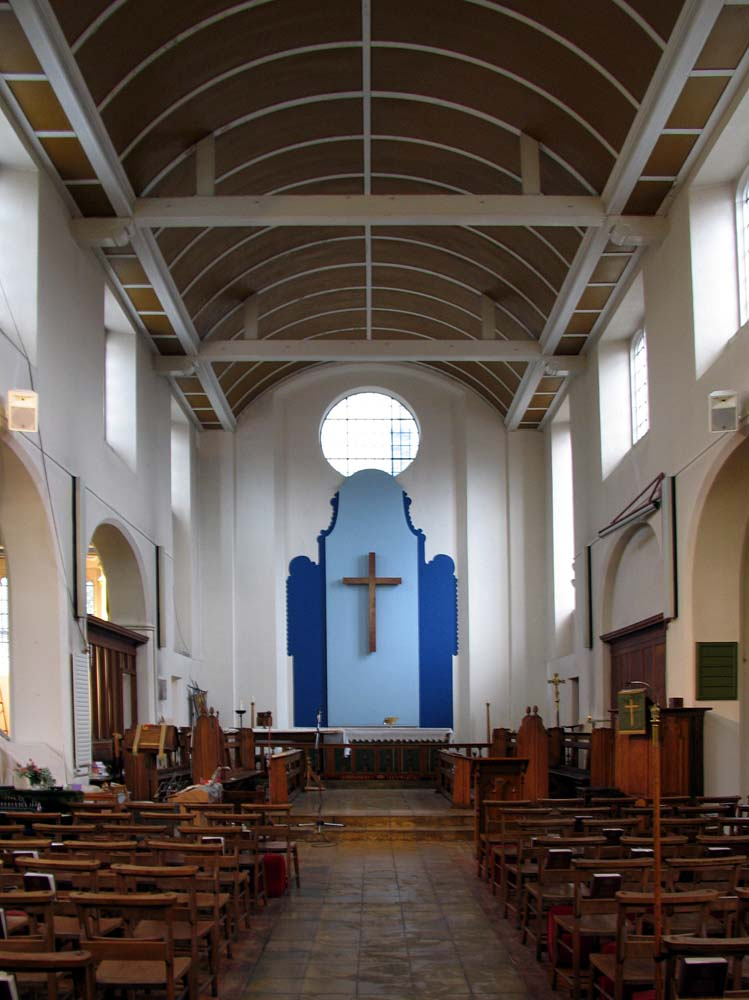
Interior of Emmanuel Parish Church in Leyton, built in 1934 to Travers' and Thomas F W Grant's design.

Church furnishing designer and stained glass artist John Hayward considered Travers' later interiors, "freed from the demands of his more extreme Anglo-Catholic Congress patrons", to have aged better than the earlier furnishings. Hayward nonetheless believes that Travers' enduring legacy lies in his stained glass, which has "so much more vitality" than that of his former master, Comper. He contends that this is partly due to Travers being "essentially a two-dimensional artist": a quality evident in his carefully designed sanctuary arrangements, conceived as liturgical scenery for "the theatre of the proscenium arch".

Buildings designed by Travers include St Cuthman's Church, Brighton and, in collaboration with architect Thomas F W Grant, The Good Shepherd, Carshalton, Emmanuel Parish Church, Leyton, and Holy Redeemer, Streatham Vale.

In 1927 he designed the coat of arms for the Royal Society of Medicine.

Martin Travers' chief assistants were Joseph E Nuttgens (glass-painting, c 1920–1922), Francis Spear (glass-painting, 1922–24), John E Crawford (glass-painting, sculpting, carving and decorating furnishings, some designing, 1924–1948), and Lawrence Lee (glass-painting, 1946–1948).

== Selected works ==
- n.d. - illustrator of a number of religious tracts written by Maurice Child and published by the Society of SS. Peter and Paul.
- n.d. - All Saints, Hove, window.
- n.d. - All Saints, Poplar, altar and tabernacle.
- n.d. - All Souls, South Ascot, chapel.
- n.d. - Holy Trinity Church, Reading, altar.
- n.d. - St Mary, Ashbury, chapel of St Hubert.
- n.d. - St Mary, Swanage, window.
- n.d. - St Mary the Virgin, Fordwich, window.
- n.d. - St Matthew's Church, Westminster, interior decoration.
- 1921 - Friern Barnet Parishioners War Memorial, war memorial.
- 1924 - St Magnus the Martyr, City of London, re-ordered.
- 1924 - St Mary, Tyneham, window.
- 1927 - Royal Society of Medicine, London, coat of arms.
- 1929 - St Mary Magdalene, Paddington, war memorial.
- 1930s - Saint Swithun, Compton Beauchamp, reredos, rood and altar. rail.
- 1930
  - 'The Good Shepherd, Carshalton Beeches, church design (with TFW Grant).
  - St Sampson, Cricklade, two windows and two altars.
- 1931-2 - The Holy Redeemer, Streatham Vale, church design (with TFW Grant).
- 1935 - Emmanuel Parish Church, Leyton, architect.
- 1936–37 - St Peter-in-the-Forest, Walthamstow, re-ordered.
- 1937-8 - St Cuthman's Church, Whitehawk, Brighton, church design.
- 1938 - St Mary and All Saints, Droxford, window
- 1938 - St Thomas of Canterbury, Camelford, window
- 1942 - Holy Trinity, Hoxton, re-ordered.
- 1946 - St Giles, Stoke Poges, window.
- 1950 - St John on Bethnal Green, London, organ case.
