= Henry Joy Fynes-Clinton =

Anglican Priest

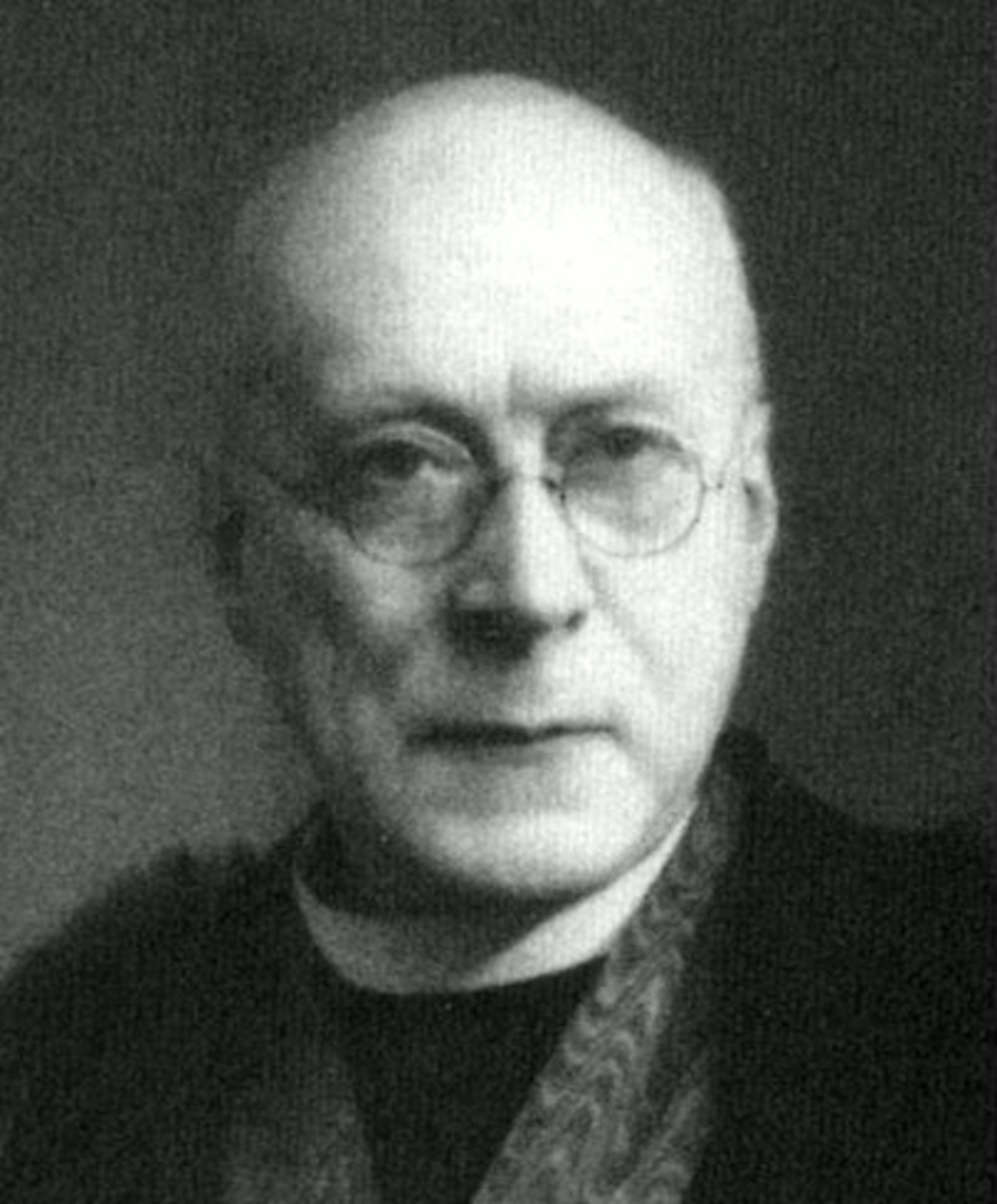
Fynes-Clinton, in c. 1950

Henry Joy Fynes-Clinton (6 May 1875 – 4 December 1959) was an Anglican priest and a leading Anglican Papalist.

== Early life and background ==
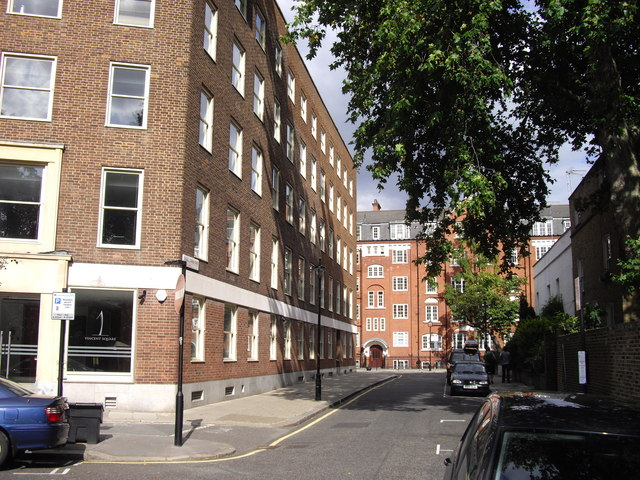
Fynes Street, Westminster

Born on 6 May 1875, Fynes-Clinton was the son of the Revd Charles Henry Fynes-Clinton, Rector of Blandford Forum, Dorset, following an initial career as a civil engineer, and of his wife Thomasina Gordon Shaw of Ballyoran, County Down. He was the grandson of the Revd Preb. Charles John Fynes Clinton, Rector of Cromwell, Nottinghamshire. His great grandfather was Charles Fynes Clinton, "a 'high and dry' divine of the old school" - after whom Fynes Street in Westminster was named - who was Canon and Sub Dean of Westminster and Rector of St Margaret's, Westminster and of St Giles' Church, Cromwell. His grandfather's two brothers served as Members of Parliament for Aldborough, a seat under the control of the Duke of Newcastle-under-Lyne. One was the classical scholar and chronologist Henry Fynes Clinton. The other was Clinton Fynes Clinton (later Fiennes-Clinton), a barrister and prominent Ultra-Tory.

He was educated at The King's School, Canterbury, winning a Ford Studentship in 1894 to Trinity College, Oxford, where he read Literae Humaniores and graduated B.A. in 1898, promoted by seniority to M.A. 1901. In 1899, after leaving Oxford, Fynes-Clinton was a tutor to the Morozov family in Smolensky Boulevard, Moscow.

After training at Ely Theological College, he was ordained a deacon in 1901 then a priest in 1902.

== Career ==
Fynes-Clinton served as a curate at St John the Evangelist, Upper Norwood, from 1901 to 1904, at St Martin's Church, Brighton, from 1904 to 1906, and St Stephen's, Lewisham, from 1906 to 1914.

He was curate at St Michael's Shoreditch from 1914 to 1921 and on 31 May 1921 became Rector of St Magnus-the-Martyr in the City of London. He substantially beautified the interior of St Magnus-the-Martyr and remained as Rector of that parish until his death on 4 December 1959.

== Achievements ==
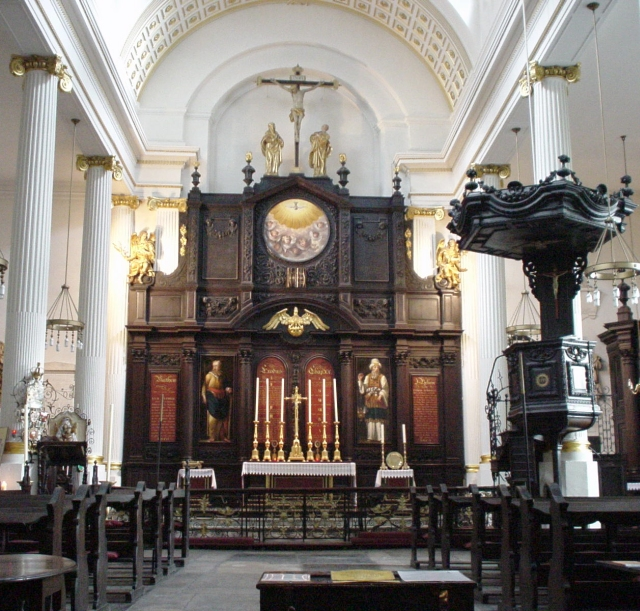
Church of St Magnus the Martyr

Fynes-Clinton was General Secretary of the Anglican and Eastern Orthodox Churches Union from its foundation in July 1906 until 1914 and thereafter of its successor, the Anglican and Eastern Churches Association. From 1920 to 1924 he served as Secretary to the Archbishop of Canterbury's Eastern Churches Committee. In the preface to his book The Relations of the Anglican Churches with the Eastern-Orthodox, Canon John Douglas commented that he had "had the great advantage of the help of my friend the Rev. H. J. Fynes-Clinton, to whom the development of the rapprochement between the Anglican and Eastern-Orthodox Churches is due more than to any living man". Fynes-Clinton was joint secretary, with R.W. Seton-Watson, of the committee established in 1916 to disseminate knowledge of Serbia throughout Great Britain and draw a tighter bond between the two countries. This organized a service at St Paul's Cathedral on 7 July 1916 to commemorate the British and Serbian soldiers, doctors and nurses who had died in the defence of Serbia. Fynes-Clinton supported the Serbian Orthodox Church, for example by raising funds for the education of theological students at Oxford, and was awarded the Serbian Order of St Sava (2nd class 1918, 1st class 1921). He was also one of the Secretaries of the St Sophia Redemption Committee, founded in 1918, which promoted the restoration of the Hagia Sophia in Constantinople to Christian worship.

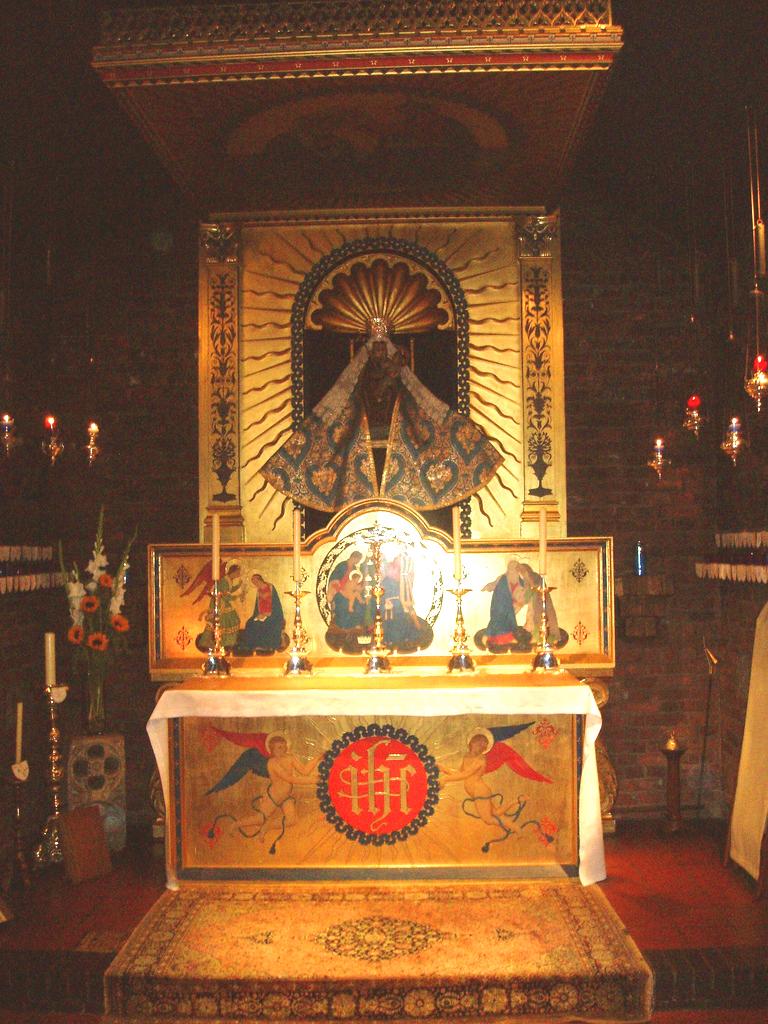
The Holy House at Walsingham

On 6 January 1920, Fynes-Clinton published a pamphlet to all churches and chapels in England in support of Armenians, Syrians and other Christians of the Ottoman Empire. He was responsible for escorting the Orthodox delegation to the 1920 Lambeth Conference, which passed a number of resolutions relating to the "Reunion of Christendom" Fynes-Clinton had himself argued in Lectures on the Russian Church: Its Ceremonial that "it is in the Universal Church alone that the fullness of the harmony of Truth and of spiritual Life can be found". During the visit of Mar Timotheus, (1878 – 1945), Patriarch Locum Tenens, to England in 1923-24 Fynes-Clinton invited those concerned "to assist and to pray with [ the Church of the East ] for the restoration of their Homeland and freedom of the distressed remnants of the Assyrian people".

Fynes-Clinton was delighted the House of Commons rejected the 1928 Prayer Book. The defeat of the Deposited Book provided freedom for Anglican Papalists to continue with services in the way they preferred. Fynes-Clinton is reported to have said that the term 'Deposited Book' was a mot juste for the 1928 version, as it should properly be deposited in the rubbish bin.

Fynes-Clinton was one of the founding guardians and a significant benefactor of the Shrine of Our Lady of Walsingham, served for many years as Priest Director of The Catholic League, fostered the Octave of Church Unity and played a leading role in promoting the cause of reunion of the Church of England with Rome. For example, Fynes-Clinton and other clergy issued a manifesto in advance of the centenary of the Oxford Movement deprecating modernism and calling for reunion with the Apostolic See of Rome. Fynes-Clinton developed his arguments in The Church of England and the Holy See: What are we to say? His position was that "Our schism from Rome was corporate: the remedy must be corporate. Individual secession serves but to postpone reunion and leaves the problem where it was before.... The supreme need of the Church of England to-day is Corporate Return to the Holy See". In 1937 and 1938 he organized visits to allow Fr Paul Couturier to meet active parishes in the Anglican Catholic tradition and visit a number of the then vigorous Anglican religious communities.

In assessing his influence, Michael Yelton concludes that "Fynes-Clinton was a more important figure than his detractors would have. His opponents looked only at his propensity for founding more and more organisations ... without appreciating his enormously wide international contacts with both Eastern and Western churches, as well as his generally sensible counsel given to all who asked for it and some who did not."

Fynes-Clinton served as Master of the Worshipful Company of Plumbers for 1941/43. From 1945 until his death he was an active Governor of Quainton Hall School in Harrow, which was owned by the Walsingham College (Affiliated Schools) Ltd, and represented the Guardians of Walsingham when the school's chapel was dedicated in 1955. Fynes-Clinton remained active until his death at the age of 84.

== See also ==
- Earl of Lincoln
