= Society of SS. Peter and Paul =

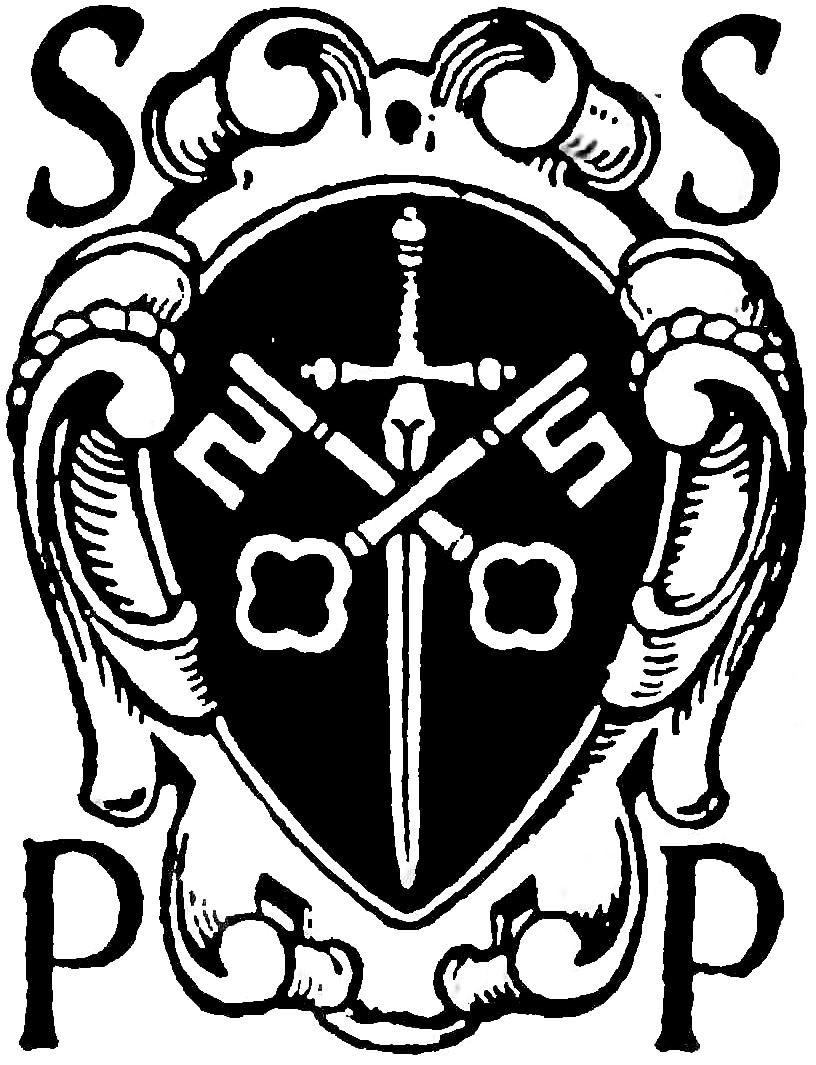
Insignia of the Society

The Society of SS. Peter and Paul (Society, or SSPP) was an English Anglo-Catholic publishing company, sometimes mistakenly thought to have been in the Anglo-Papalist wing of Anglo-Catholicism. The Society was established in 1911 as a reaction to the works of the Anglican 'Prayer Book Catholic' priest and liturgist Percy Dearmer, particularly The Parson's Handbook, which advocated a liturgical style distinct to England and rooted in the Sarum rite.

The Society believed that the Church of England should follow the ceremonial development of the Western (Roman) Church, using the Eucharistic rite of the 1549 Book of Common Prayer "enriched ceremonially and ritually from parent sources", and that the best means to accomplish this was to produce missals and other prayer books to promote and facilitate this endeavour.

The Society worked closely with the ecclesiastical artist Martin Travers to produce the desired aesthetic for the movement.

The SSPP was responsible for the publication of the Anglican Missal, still used by some Anglo-Catholics and other high-church Anglicans. The SSPP did not prepare The English Missal, an essentially Elizabethan English translation, published by W. Knott & Son, of the pre-Vatican II Latin Missale Romanum (The English Missal being more favored by Anglo-Papalist-leaning "Ritualist" Anglo-Catholics).
