= The Anglican Service Book =

Traditional language service book of the Episcopal Church

The Anglican Service Book is an unofficial Anglican prayer book in traditional language which was first published in the United States in 1991. The book was compiled by a committee of priests, and published when David Moyer was rector of the Church of the Good Shepherd in Rosemont, Pennsylvania, United States.

== Overview ==
The book's foreword states that "The Anglican Service Book is a compilation of material from a number of sources focused around the structure of the 1979 Book of Common Prayer", a prayer book of the Episcopal Church in the United States. The other sources include the Anglican Missal, Book of Occasional Services, Saint Augustine's Prayer Book, and Sarum Missal.

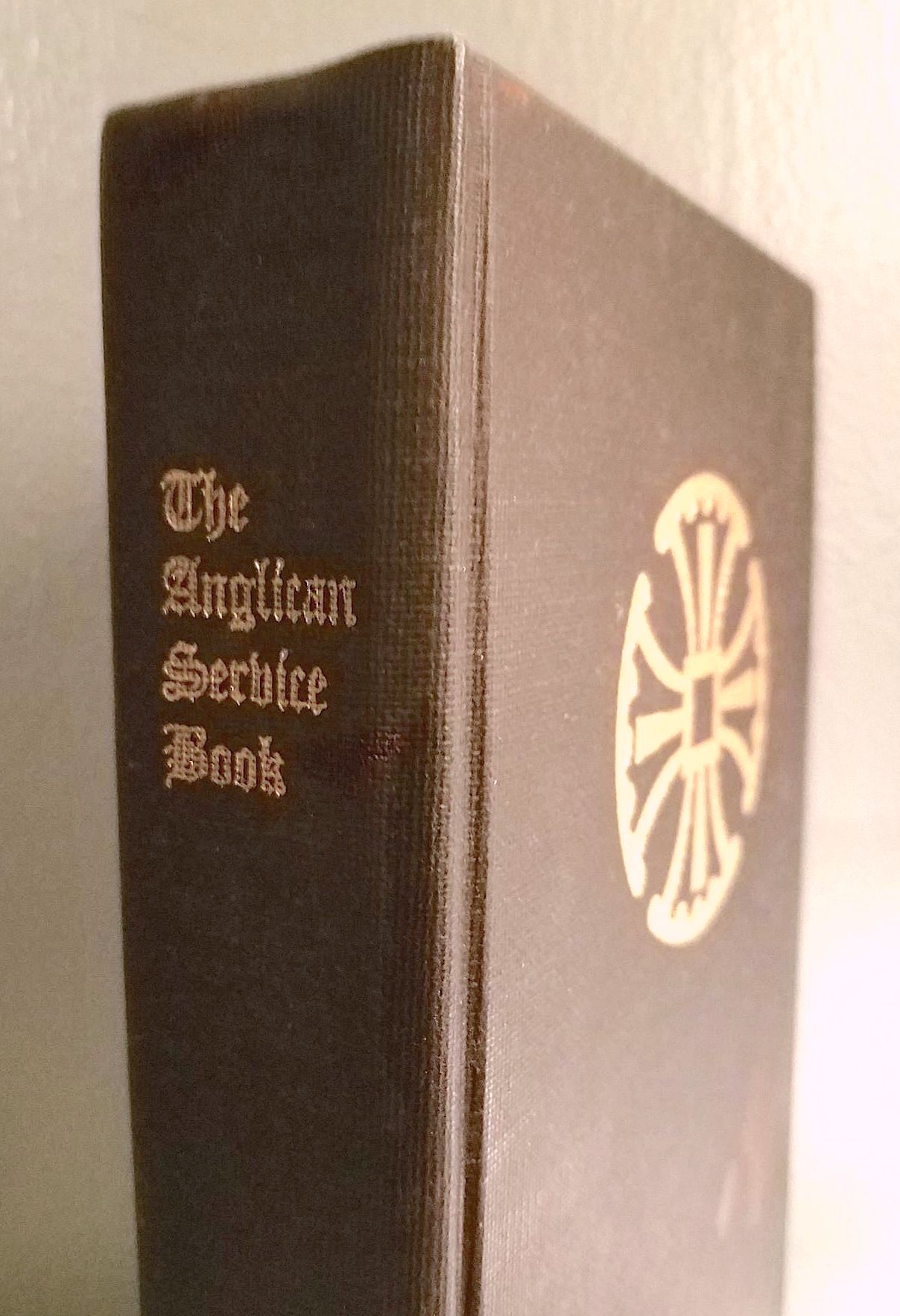
The Anglican Service Book (1991)

The book was published to facilitate worship in the traditional language of Anglicanism, as the 1979 Book of Common Prayer provided this option for only some services such as the daily offices, Holy Communion, and funerals. The 1979 BCP did not provide traditional language services for baptism, marriage, ordination, Compline, or other pastoral offices.

== See also ==
- Anglo-Catholicism

== Sources ==
- The Anglican Service Book, 1991, ISBN 0-9629955-0-9
