= Francis Spear =

English stained glass artist and lithographer

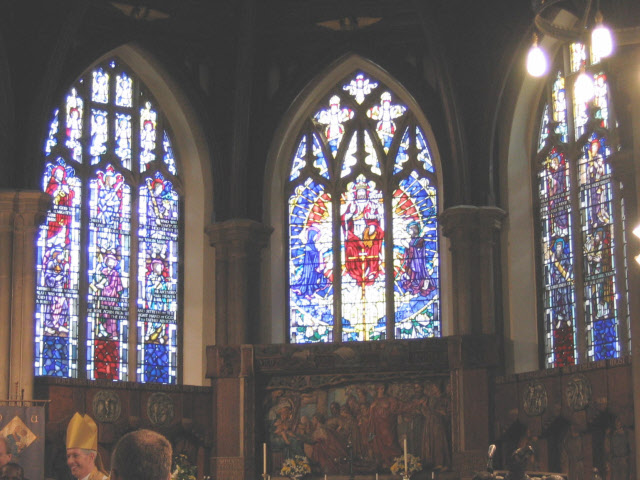
The east window of St Bartholomew's Church, Sydenham

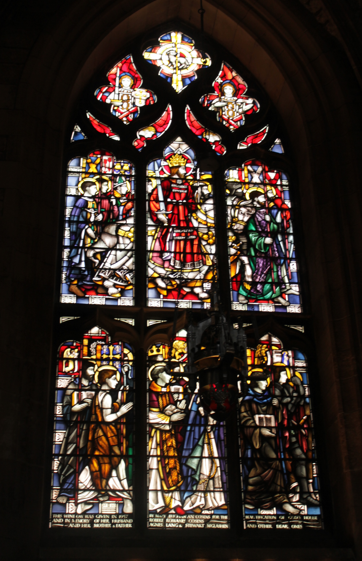
Memorial window to Robert Romanes Cosens by Francis Spear, St Giles Cathedral

Francis Howard Spear (22 December 1902 in South Norwood, London – 7 November 1979) was an English stained glass artist and lithographer. He produced more than 300 stained glass windows in over 130 public locations, including six cathedrals.

On leaving school in Battersea, Spear attended the London County Council Central School of Arts & Crafts, graduating in Industrial Design (with a specialisation in stained glass) in 1923. His graphic design talents were exemplified by three posters for London Tramways which he produced while at the Central School in 1923. He went on to win a National Scholarship to study at the Royal College of Art, gaining a Diploma from the Design School in 1926. In 1922, while still a student, he had become pupil-assistant to the leading English practitioner of stained glass, Martin Travers, and continued to assist him until the Second World War.

In 1928, Spear became part-time Teacher of Lithography at the Royal College of Art (remaining until 1948), and from 1929 until 1953 held a position as part-time instructor in stained glass at the Central School.

His first public commission was the impressive 5-light west window at Warwick School (1925). Many early and subsequent works were carried out with the assistance of the firm of Lowndes & Drury in Fulham, and Spear rented a studio there from 1935 until 1941 at which point war service took over his time. During the war, Spear served as a firefighter in Shepherd's Bush for three years but also assisted in the removal, for safe keeping, of the stained glass windows from Canterbury Cathedral. After the War, he set up his own studio in Chelsea in 1946, then moved to Islington, and finally to Reigate in 1951 where he made his base for the rest of his life. Such was the demand for stained glass to replace windows destroyed in the war, that by 1947 Spear was employing four assistants.

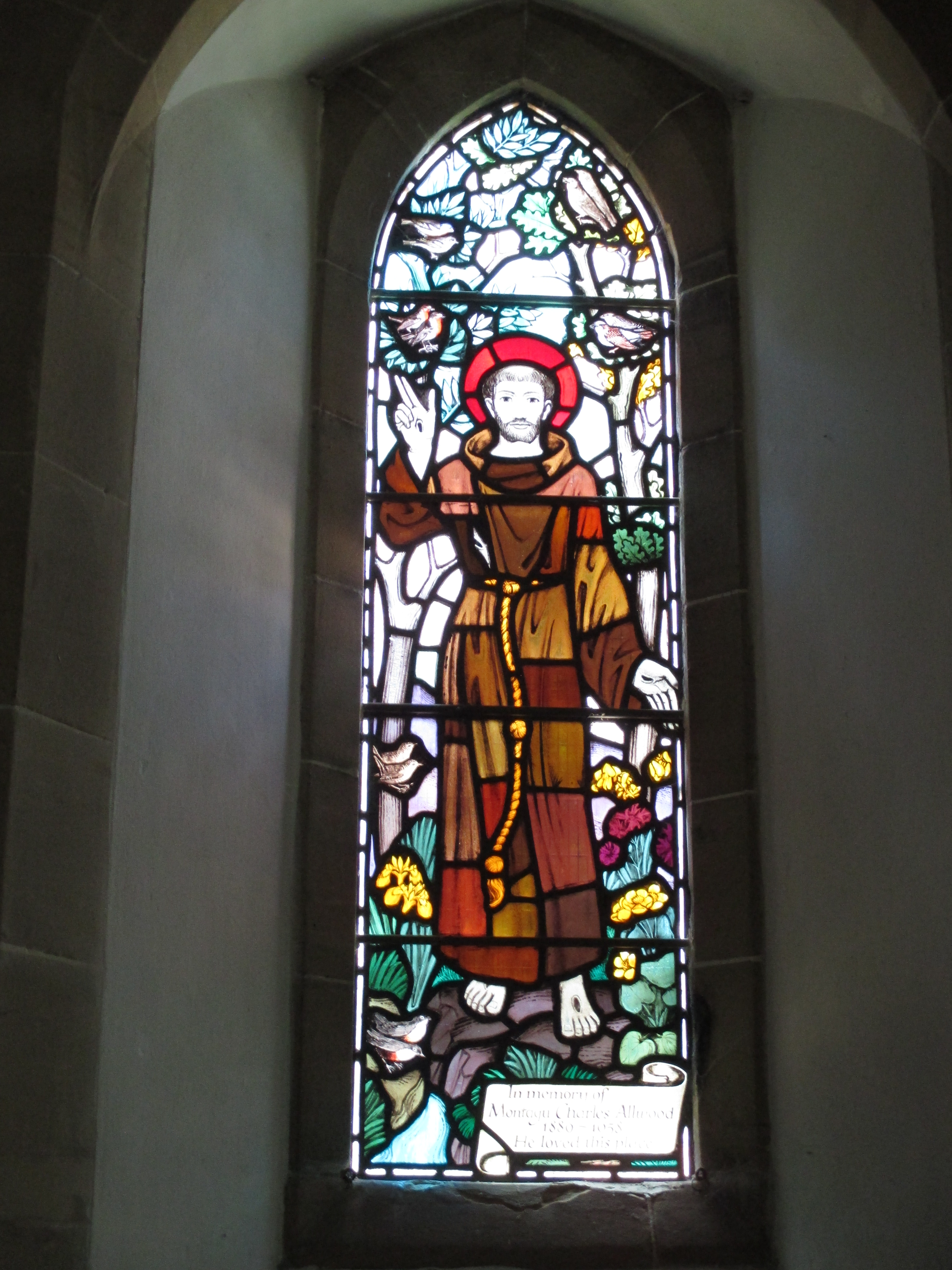
First north aisle window of St Peter and St John the Baptist's Church, Wivelsfield, East Sussex

Spear's style was much influenced by that of Martin Travers, employing a restrained English idiom. The experimentation of church window design in the thirties was replaced in the post-war period with a demand, in the rebuilding of churches, that the great Christian themes should be presented in what was considered to be a convincing and reasonably conventional manner. There are good examples of Spear's style at St Gregory's Canterbury (1949), Felmersham in Bedfordshire (1951), St John's in Bromley (1951), several windows in St Bartholomew's in Sydenham (1953) and the east window at St Alphege in Greenwich (1953) which respects the Baroque architecture.

High points in Spear's career can be seen as his west window at Warwick School, the east window (1951) and lancets (1953) of Glasgow Cathedral, Memorial window to Robert Romanes Cosens in St Giles Cathedral in Edinburgh (1957), a series of windows in St George's Cathedral, Cape Town (1957–66), and in a rather more radical idiom, his 1962 west widow at All Saint's, Penarth.
