= Emmanuel Parish Church, Leyton =

Coordinates: 51.569111°N 0.029073°W

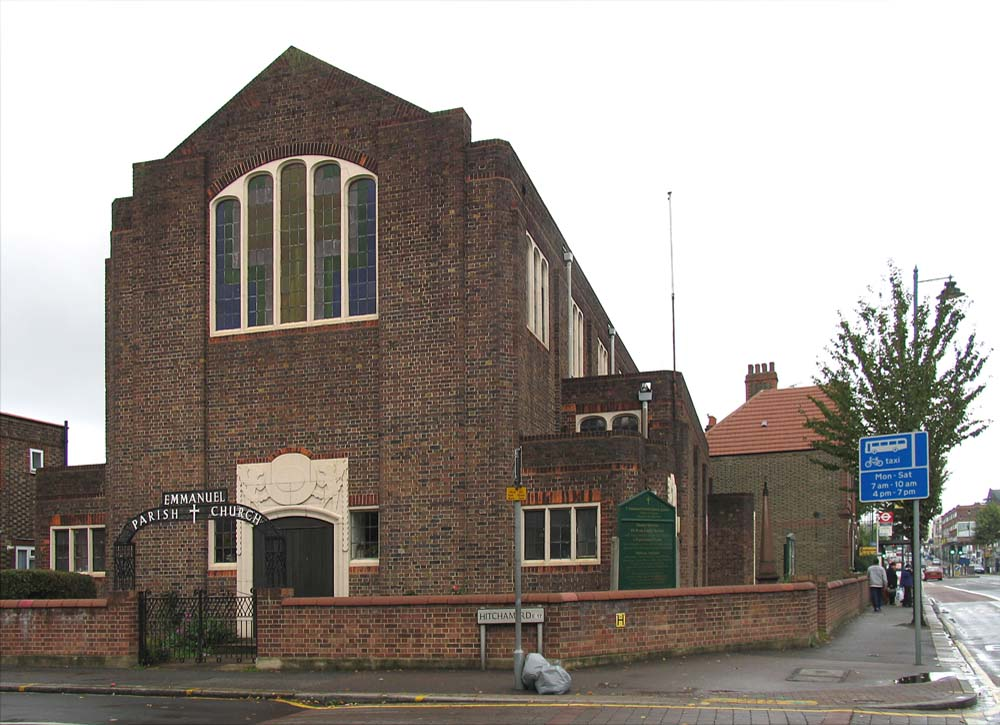
- View of the western end of Emmanuel Church
- Emmanuel Parish Church, Leyton
- Location: 251 Lea Bridge Road, Leyton, London, E17 8HL
- Country: England
- Denomination: Church of England
- Website: http://www.emmanuelleyton.org/

History
- Status: Active
- Dedication: Emmanuel
- Dedicated: 1935

Architecture
- Functional status: Parish church
- Heritage designation: Grade II listed
- Designated: 24 February 1987
- Architect(s): Martin Travers and T. F. W. Grant
- Style: Stripped perpendicular Gothic
- Years built: 1934-35

Administration
- Diocese: Chelmsford
- Archdeaconry: West Ham

The Emmanuel Parish Church, Leyton, is a Grade II listed Church of England parish church in Lea Bridge Road, Leyton, in Greater London.

== History ==
The origins of the church began in about 1902, when mission services began to be held in Sybourn Street elementary school under the auspices of All Saints parish church in Capworth Street, Leyton. Subsequently, a plot of land in Bloxhall Road at the junction with Lea Bridge Road was donated for a church by the property developer Sir Courtenay Warner, whose Warner Estate housing dominated the area. In 1906 a temporary brick church (now the church hall), designed by E. C. Frere, was opened, and in 1920 Emmanuel became a mission district. In June 1934, the foundation stone was laid for a new permanent church to be built alongside the temporary one, to the design of Martin Travers and T. F. W. Grant. The new church was consecrated on 20 April 1935. A separate ecclesiastical parish was formed for the church in the same year.

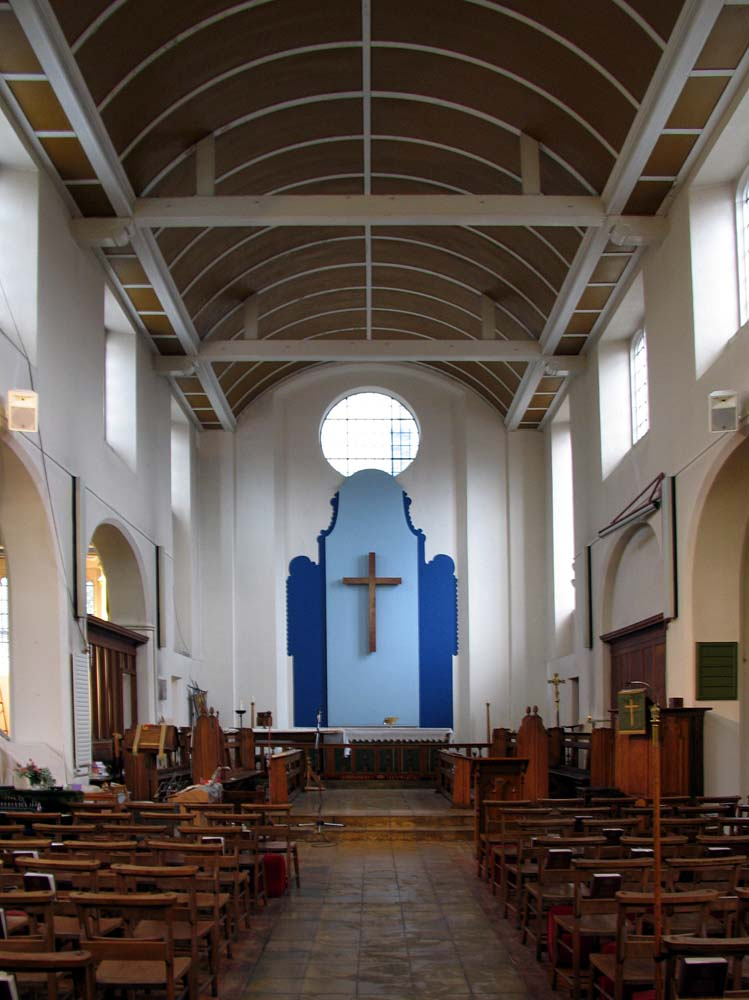
Interior of Emmanuel Church looking east.

== Description ==
The exterior is of red brick in a style described as "simple Tudor" or "vernacular Gothic". The ground plan is rectangular, 89 feet (27 m) in length, consisting of a nave with two aisles. The north aisle ends in a side chapel while the narrower south aisle which is next to the main road was built without windows to reduce traffic noise. The short chancel is at the same height as the nave, so that the roof is continuous along the length of the building. The planned capacity was for a congregation of 336 plus seating for the choir and clergy. The main door is at the west end which gives entry under a gallery. A cupola included in the original design was omitted through lack of funds Much of the church furniture, including the reredos, altar rail and font were designed by the architect.
