= Lea Bridge Road =

Road in East London, England

Coordinates: 51°33′38″N 0°03′00″W

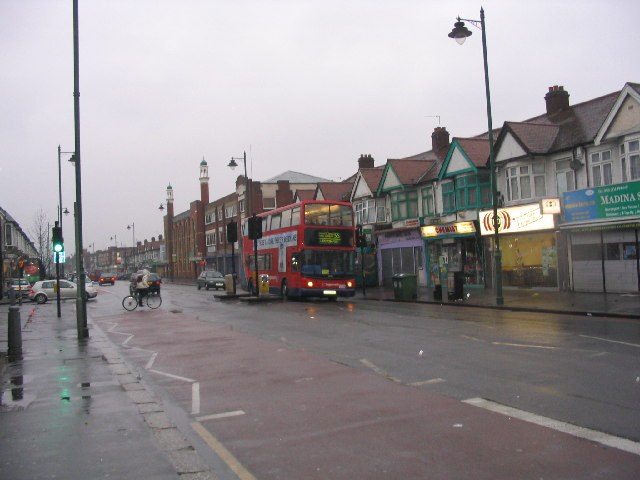
Lea Bridge Road looking towards the junction with Markhouse Road and Church Road in 2006.

Lea Bridge Road is a major through route in east London, across the Lea Valley from Clapton to Whipps Cross in Leyton. It forms part of the A104 road.

Places served on the road are the Lea Valley Park, Lea Bridge railway station and the Baker's Arms area. Formerly the Lea Bridge Stadium was located along Lea Bridge Road, and served as a home for Leyton Orient and later a speedway team. Almost opposite the stadium, Emmanuel Parish Church, built in 1935, is a Grade II listed building.

== History ==
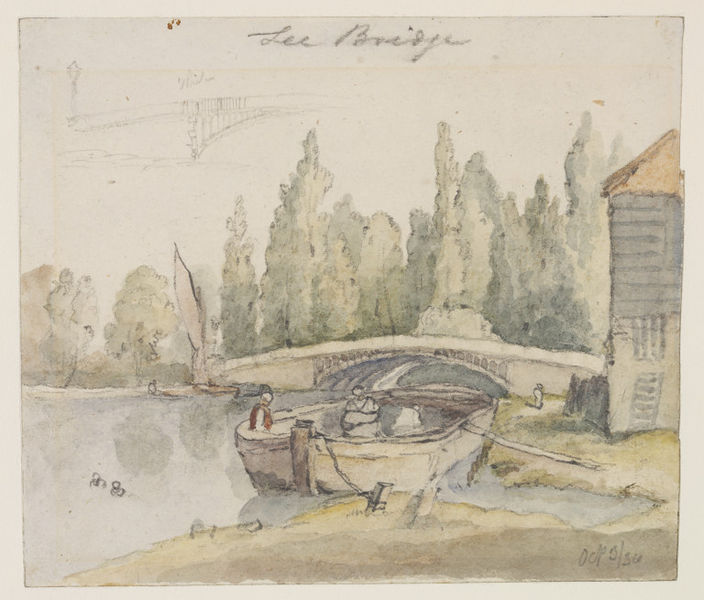
Thomas Hosmer Shepherd's 1834 watercolour sketch of the old Lea Bridge, built in 1820

The road takes its name from Lea Bridge, which crosses the River Lea at Leyton Marshes. A bridge over the river at this point was built to replace a ferry, either in 1745 or sometime after 1757. The second road bridge opened circa 1890 and the present third Lea Bridge Road Bridge was opened Mon 21 August 1995. The name Lea Bridge Road was adopted for an existing lane previously called Mill Field Lane.

=== Route ===
It runs from Clapton north along the western edge of Hackney Marshes thereby forming the border between Hackney and Waltham Forest, until it reaches the junction of Orient Way and Argall Avenue at the eastern edge of Leyton. Entering the London Borough of Waltham Forest, it then runs 0.6 miles through the neighbourhood of Leyton. From the junction with Bakers Arms it runs to the Whipps Cross roundabout where it forms the boundary between Leytonstone and Walthamstow.

== Transport ==
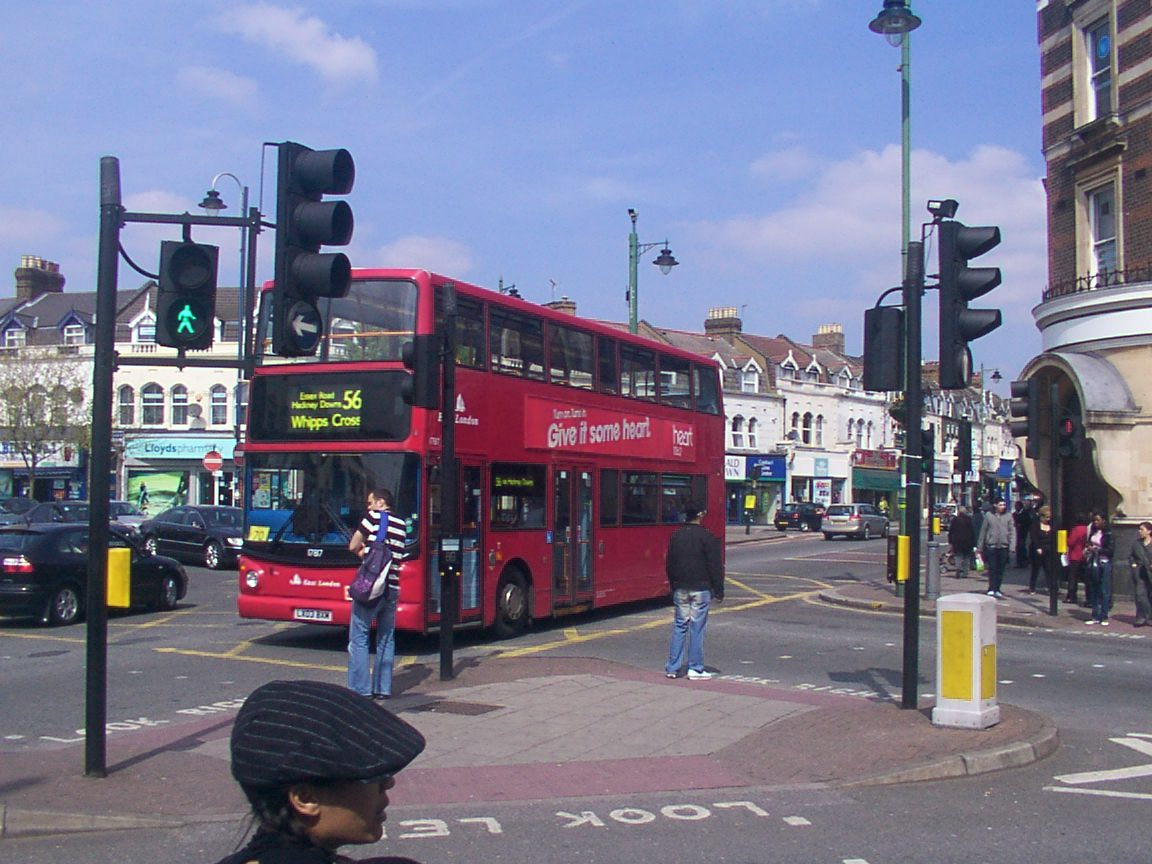
A number 56 bus on Lea Bridge Road at the Baker's Arms junction

Bus routes passing along Lea Bridge Road are 20, 55, 56, 230, 257, 308, 357, N38, N55, W15, W16 and W19.

London Cycle Network Route 9 utilises Lea Bridge Road; it connects Epping, Chingford and Walthamstow with Hackney and the City of London.

Lea Bridge railway station, on the north side of Lea Bridge Road near the junction with Argall Way/Orient Way, actually opened on Sunday 15 May 2016, but officially on Monday 16 May 2016. The first rail station at Lea Bridge Road opened on 15 Sept 1840, though it was renamed Lea Bridge during 1841, but it was closed on 8 July 1985.
