= English Missal =

1912 Anglican liturgical book

The English Missal (sometimes referred to as the Knott Missal) is an English-language translation of the pre-Vatican II Latin Missale Romanum used by some Anglo-Catholic parish churches. After its first publication by W. Knott & Son in 1912, The English Missal was rapidly endorsed by the growing "Ritualist" faction within the Anglo-Catholic clergy, which leaned Anglo-Papalist and viewed the liturgies of the Book of Common Prayer as insufficient expressions of fully Catholic worship. The translation of the Roman Missal from Latin into the stylized Elizabethan Early Modern English of the Book of Common Prayer allowed such clergy to adopt Roman Catholic texts and liturgical rubrics in a dignified form of the vernacular tongue familiar to the Church of England.

The only difference in content from the (Latin) Roman Missal of the time is The English Missal's inclusion of certain texts from the Book of Common Prayer, including optional prayers from the ordinary of the Prayer Book's Communion Service and the lessons for Sundays and major feast days from the Prayer Book's lectionary, which were themselves taken from the earlier Sarum Use Mass of pre-Reformation England.

After the Public Worship Regulation Act 1874 threatened imprisonment for priests using ritualist liturgical practices, a custom arose of the celebrant saying the Roman Canon in Latin to himself silently (i.e., sotto voce, in a soft voice) in addition to saying the official texts of the Book of Common Prayer aloud. While enforcement of the Public Worship Regulation Act ended in 1906, the custom persisted, due in part to the fact that in the pre-Vatican II Roman Rite the Canon of the Mass was always said likewise quietly. For this reason, the Latin text of the Canon of the Mass was included in The English Missal in addition to the English translation.

The English Missal went through five editions. The first four were based on the Roman Missal of Pius V as revised until the time of Pope Pius X. The last edition includes the revised Roman Catholic Holy Week of 1958. One American edition includes material that conforms to the American 1928 Book of Common Prayer.

== Influence and legacy ==
The Swahili liturgy approved for use^{[when and by whom?]} in the Anglican Diocese of Zanzibar permitted the usage of the English Missal's prefaces, these being taken from the 1662 Prayer Book and the Roman Missal.

In the aftermath of the Second Vatican Council and the subsequent authorization of new typical editions of the Roman Missal with official translations in English, the use of The English Missal has greatly declined. The Roman Catholic Church's English version of the Roman Missal^{[which?]} has become more common in Anglo-Catholic churches, especially in England. Use of The English Missal nevertheless continues in a small number of Anglo-Catholic churches in England and the United States. In 2021, The English Missal was adopted by the Oxford English Missal Society, which has since organized Masses according to the English Missal at Pusey House and elsewhere in the Oxford area.

== Current use ==
=== Church of England ===
Parish	Image	Location	Notes	Refs
All Saints, North Street		York	Used at all Masses, in combination with Common Worship Order One, in traditional language.	
St Chad, Toller Lane		Bradford		
St John the Baptist, Leamington Spa	A red brick Victorian church with daffodils in the foreground	Leamington Spa	The English Missal is used for Low Mass on Fridays at 4.30pm	
St John the Baptist, Tuebrook		Liverpool	The English Missal is used for 11 a.m. High Mass on Sundays and all weekday Masses.	
St Luke, Southport		Southport	The English Missal is used for Low Mass on Fridays.	
St Mary Magdalen, Coventry		Coventry	The English Missal is used for Low Mass on Tuesdays at 6pm.	
St Magnus the Martyr, London Bridge		London	The English Missal is used for 11 a.m. High Mass on Sundays.	
St Benet Fink, Tottenham		London	The English Missal is used for 7:30 a.m. Low Mass on Saturdays.	

=== Episcopal Church (United States) ===
Parish	Image	Location	Notes	Refs
Church of the Resurrection		New York City		
St Clement's, Philadelphia		Philadelphia		
St Paul's, K Street		Washington, D.C.	Low Masses on Saturdays are offered according to The English Missal.	

== See also ==
- Anglican Breviary
- Anglican Missal
