= Anglican Breviary =

Anglican edition of the Divine Office

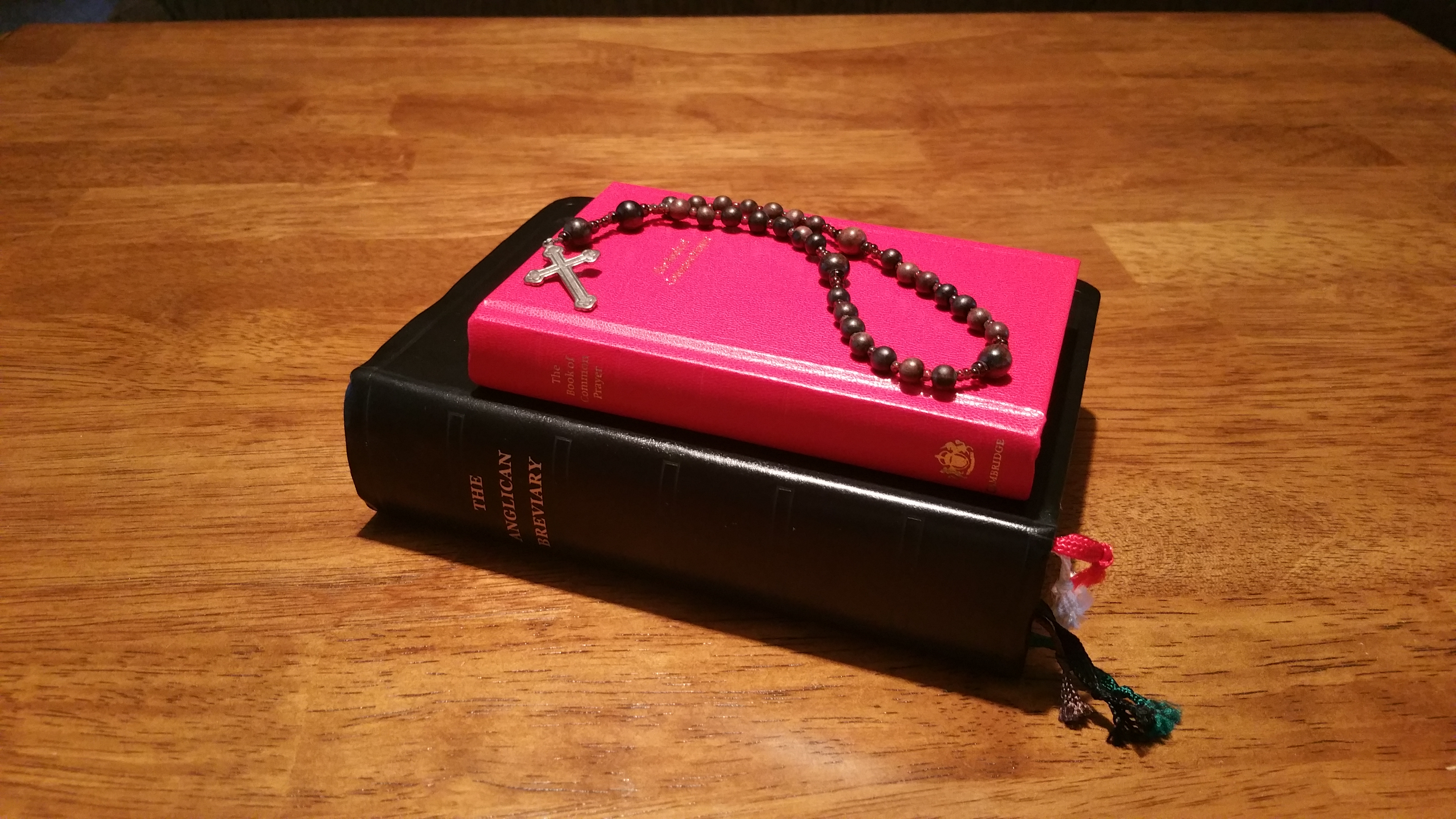
The Anglican Breviary and the Book of Common Prayer with a set of Anglican prayer beads

The Anglican Breviary is an Anglican edition of the Divine Office translated into English, used especially by Anglicans of Anglo-Catholic churchmanship. It is based on the Roman Breviary as it existed prior to both the Second Vatican Council and the 1955 liturgical reforms of Pope Pius XII.

It contains the liturgical offices of the hours:

- Matins or Midnight Prayer (Midnight)
- Lauds or Dawn Prayer (Dawn)
- Prime or Early Morning Prayer (7 am)
- Terce or Mid-Morning Prayer (9 am)
- Sext or Midday Prayer (12 noon)
- None or Mid-Afternoon Prayer (3 pm)
- Vespers or Evening Prayer (6 pm)
- Compline or Night Prayer (9 pm)

== See also ==
- Anglican Missal
- English Missal
