= Michael Yelton =

English judge

Michael Yelton is an English lay authority of the history of the Church of England, particularly the Anglo-Catholic movement. He is secretary of the Anglo-Catholic History Society and a retired county court judge from 22 April 2020.

== Works ==
- Peter Anson: Monk, Writer and Artist: An Introduction to His Life and Work (2005) ISBN 9780955071409
- Alfred Hope Patten and the Shrine of Our Lady of Walsingham (2006) ISBN 9781853117534
- Empty Tabernacles: Twelve Lost Churches of London (2006) ISBN 9780955071423
- Alfred Hope Patten: His Life and Times in Pictures (2007) ISBN 9780955071430
- Anglican Church-building in London 1915-1945 (2007) ISBN 9781904965145
- Anglican Papalism: An Illustrated History, 1900-1960 (2009) ISBN 9781853118616
- Outposts of the Faith: Anglo-Catholicism in Some Rural Parishes (2009) ISBN 9781853119859
- The Twenty One: An Anglo-Catholic Rebellion in London, 1929 (2009) ISBN 9780955071454
- The South India Controversy and the Converts of 1955-1956: An Episode in Recent Anglo-Catholic History (2010) ISBN 9780955071478
- An Anglo-Catholic Scrapbook, Produced to Mark the Tenth Anniversary of the Foundation of the Anglo-Catholic History Society (2010) ISBN 9780955071485
- Anglican Church-building in London 1946-2012 (2013) ISBN 9781904965442
- More Empty Tabernacles: Another Twelve Lost Churches of London (2014) ISBN 9780956056559
- (foreword), Anglican Abbot: Dom Denys Prideaux (2016) ISBN 9780956056580
- Martin Travers: His Life and Work (2016) ISBN 9781904965527
- St Silas, Pentonville: The First 150 Years (2017) ISBN 9780956056597
- Twenty Priests for Twenty Years: A Commemorative Volume to Mark the Twentieth Anniversary of the Anglo-Catholic History Society (2020) ISBN 9781916327603
- An Anglo-Catholic Miscellany (2021) ISBN 9781916327610
- The Community of Reparation to Jesus in the Blessed Sacrament and the Church of St Alphege, Southwark (2022) ISBN 9781916327627
- Alfred Hope Patten and the Shrine of Our Lady of Walsingham (2022) ISBN 9781789592252
