= Anglican Missal =

Anglican liturgical book

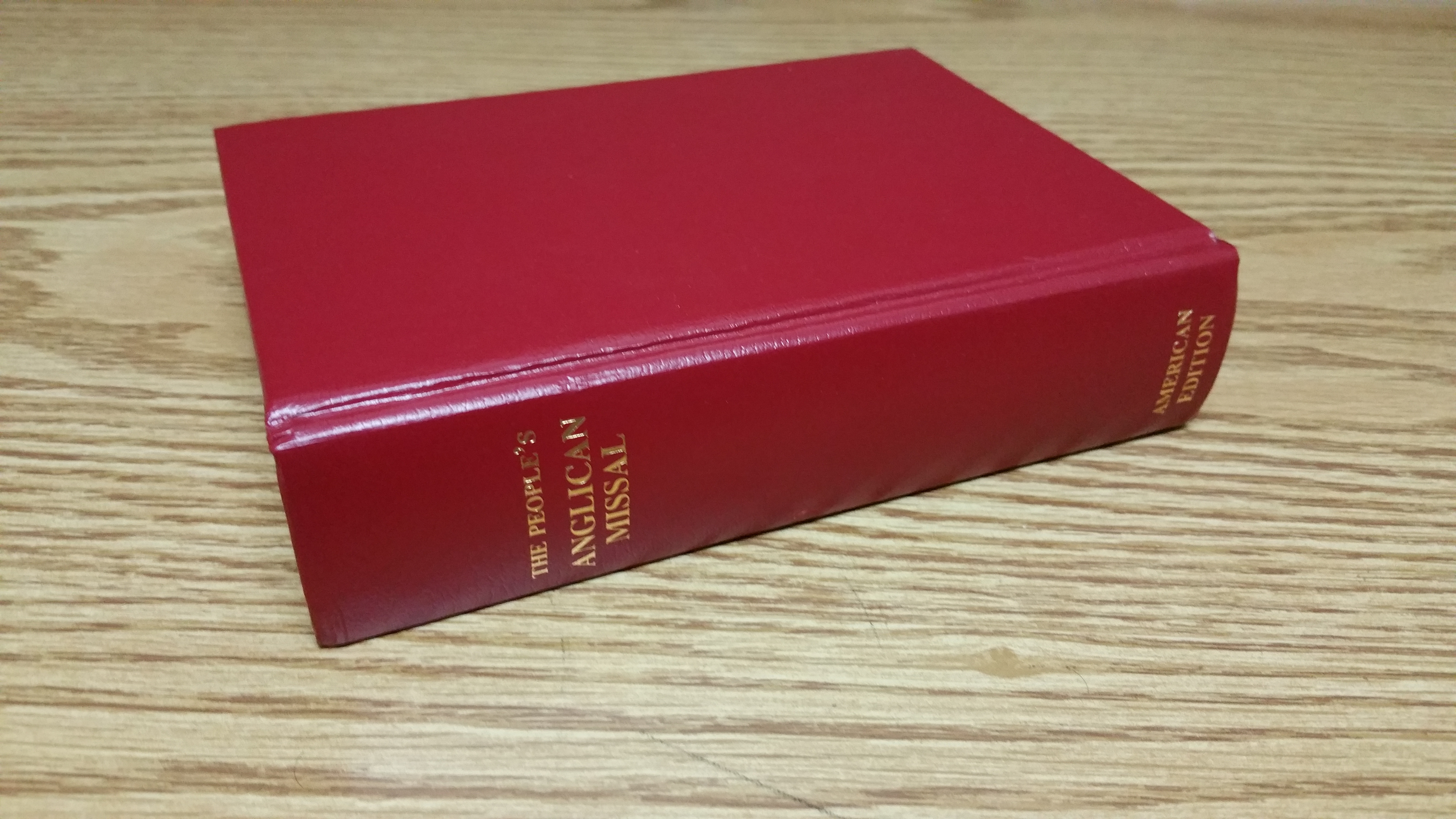
A pew edition of the Anglican Missal sitting on a desk in the vestry of an Anglican church.

The Anglican Missal is a liturgical book used liturgically by some Anglo-Catholics and other High Church Anglicans as an alternative or supplement to editions of the Book of Common Prayer. The Anglican Missal is distinct from the similarly Anglo-Catholic English Missal, as the Anglican Missal is not primarily a translation of the Roman Missal of the Catholic Church.

== History ==
The Anglican Missal was first produced in England in 1921 by the Society of SS. Peter and Paul. The book reflected a particular way, drawn from the traditional Roman Rite, of celebrating the Eucharist according to Anglican liturgical use. It was brought to the United States, Canada, and other English-speaking countries over the course of the 20th century.

== American edition ==
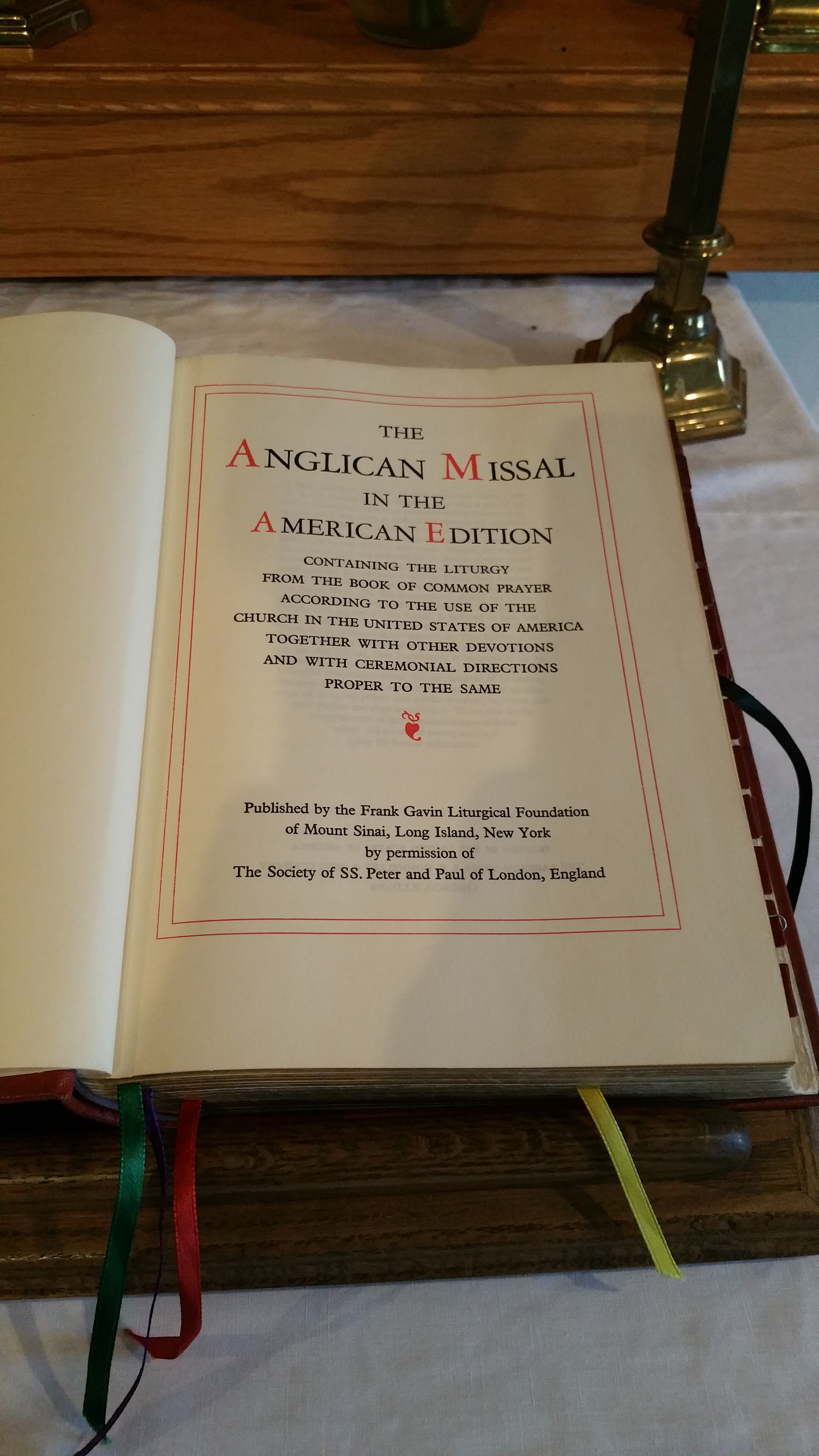
The Anglican Missal sitting on an altar desk in an Anglican parish church

In the United States, the Anglican Missal was produced in former years by the Frank Gavin Liturgical Foundation, which sold to the Anglican Parishes Association the rights to its publication. The Frank Gavin edition of the Anglican Missal in the American Edition is in turn simply an American version of the missal produced in England. Some adjustments were needed to adapt the version from England to use in the United States by the Frank Gavin Liturgical Foundation.

In 2020, the Anglican Parishes Association published a new edition of the Anglican Missal, containing the Ordinary and Canon from the English (1549), American (1928), South African (1954), Canadian (1962), and Indian (1963) Prayer Books, along with a parallel text of the Gregorian Mass in Latin and in English. The new edition is available in two versions: the Anglican Altar Missal and the People's Anglican Missal.

The new American edition of the missal retains the three versions of the Eucharistic prayer that were in the former edition. These are the American Canon of 1928 (related to Eucharistic Prayer I in the 1979 Book of Common Prayer of the Episcopal Church in the United States of America), the 1549 canon as translated and illuminated by Thomas Cranmer, and an English translation of the Roman Canon (Eucharistic Prayer I in modern Roman Catholic missals, called the "Gregorian Canon" in the Anglican Missal).

== Variations ==
Some Anglo-Catholic parishes of the 'Prayer Book Catholic' wing of the Anglo-Catholic tradition use the Anglican Missal, or some variation of it, for the celebration of Mass. Such parishes may also draw from the Anglican Service Book, the A Manual of Anglo-Catholic Devotion, and the directive books A Priest's Handbook by Dennis Michno and Ceremonies of the Eucharist by Howard E. Galley.

All of these books (with the exception of the Manual and Anglican Service Book) are intended primarily for celebration of the Eucharist. They contain meditations for the presiding celebrant(s) during the liturgy, and other material such as the rite for the blessing of palms on Palm Sunday, propers for special feast days, and instructions for proper ceremonial order. These books are used to provide a more expansively Catholic context from which to celebrate the liturgical use found in the Book of Common Prayer and related liturgical books.

== See also ==
- Anglican Breviary
- The Parson's Handbook

== Sources ==
- The Sarum Missal
- St. Augustine's House Lutheran Monastery, Ordo
- A Manual of Anglo-Catholic Devotion (Canterbury Press ISBN 1-85311-354-9)
