= Anglo-Catholicism =

Anglicanism that emphasises its Catholic heritage

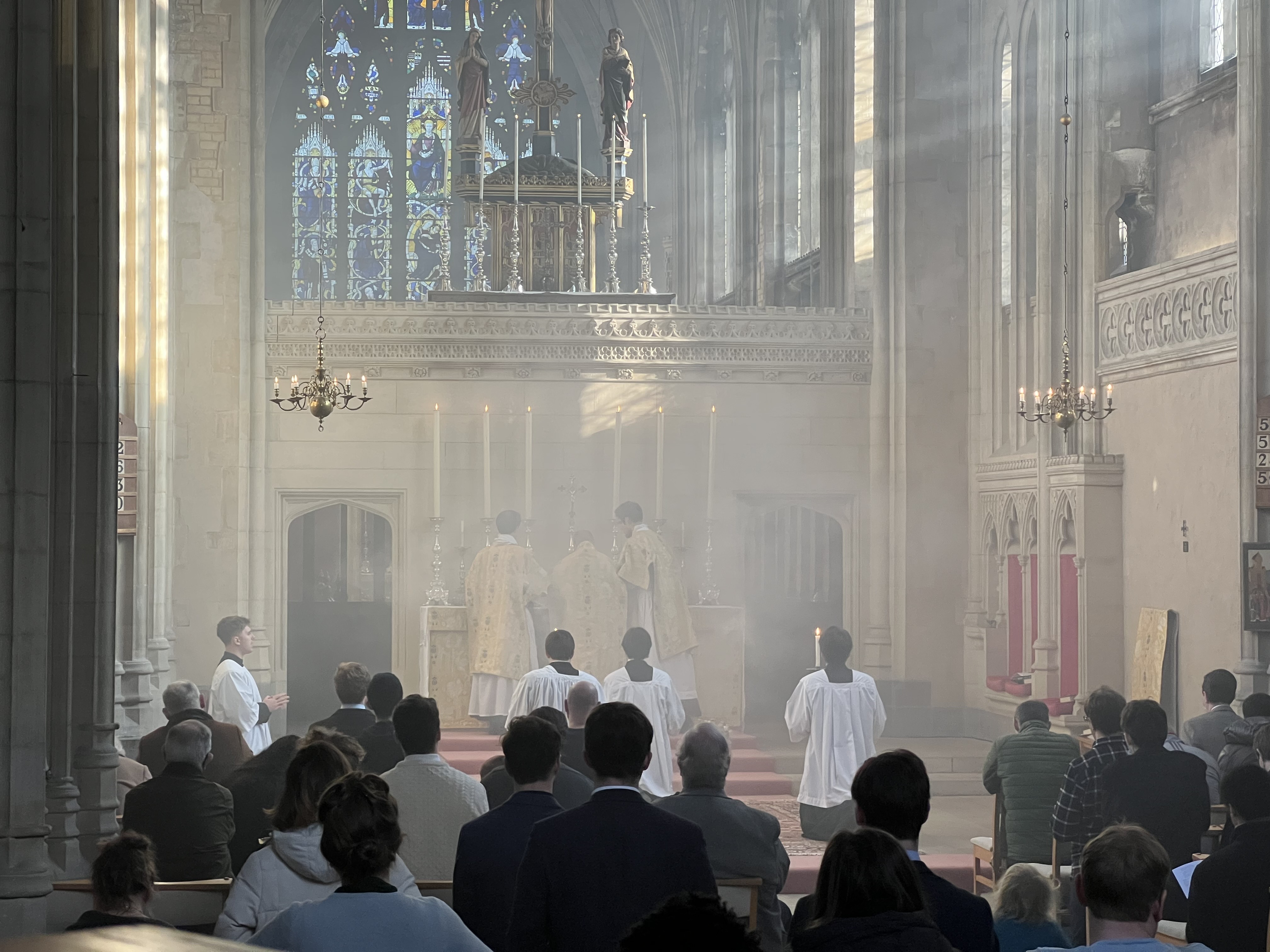
High Mass at Pusey House, Oxford

Anglo-Catholicism is a recognized theological and liturgical tradition within the Church of England and other churches within Anglicanism; it comprises beliefs and practices that emphasise the Catholic heritage, especially pre-Reformation roots, of Anglicanism. Anglo-Catholicism claims to restore liturgical and devotional expressions of church life that reflect the ancient practices of the early and medieval church.

The term was coined in the early 19th century, although movements emphasising the Catholic heritage of Anglicanism already existed. Particularly influential in the history of Anglo-Catholicism were the Caroline Divines of the 17th century, the Jacobite Nonjuring schism of the 17th and 18th centuries, and the Oxford Movement, which began at the University of Oxford in 1833 and ushered in a period of Anglican history known as the "Catholic Revival".

== History ==
The historic Anglican formularies, developed under the influence of Thomas Cranmer, include the Thirty-nine Articles of Religion and The Books of Homilies, both of which reflect the Reformed theology of the Protestant Reformation in England. The Book of Common Prayer was shaped by Cranmer as well and this became the standard liturgical text of Anglicanism for the coming centuries.

Following the passing of the Act of Supremacy and Henry VIII's break with the Roman Catholic Church, the Church of England continued to adhere to most traditional Catholic teachings and did not initially make any other major alterations to doctrine. In 1536, the Ten Articles were published and constitute the first official Anglican articles of faith. The articles for the most part concurred with the teachings of the church in England as they had been prior to the English Reformation and defended, among other things, the Real Presence of Christ in the Eucharist, the sacrament of Confession, the honouring and invocation of Christian saints, and prayer for the dead. Belief in purgatory was made non-essential. (Note: Article 10 states: "but forasmuch as the place where they be, the name thereof, and kind of pains there, also be to us uncertain by Scripture; therefore this with all other things we remit to Almighty God, unto whose mercy it is meet and convenient for us to commend them, trusting that God accepteth our prayers for them")

In 1537, this was followed by the Institution of the Christian Man, also called The Bishops' Book, a combined effort by numerous Anglican clergy and theologians which—though not strongly Protestant in its inclinations—showed a slight move towards Reformed positions. The Bishops' Book was unpopular with conservative sections of the church and quickly grew to be disliked by Henry VIII as well.

In 1539, the Six Articles moved away from all Reformed ideas and strongly affirmed Catholic positions regarding matters such as transubstantiation and Mass for the dead. The King's Book, the official article of religion written by Henry in 1543, likewise expressed Catholic sacramental theology and encouraged prayer for the dead.

A major shift in the development of Anglican doctrine came in the reign of Henry's son, Edward VI, who repealed the Six Articles and under whose rule the Church of England became more identifiably Protestant. Though the church's practices and approach to the sacraments became strongly influenced by those of continental reformers, it nevertheless retained episcopal church structure. The Church of England was then briefly reunited with the Roman Catholic Church under Mary I, before separating again under Elizabeth I. The Elizabethan Religious Settlement was an attempt to end the religious divisions among Christians in England, and is often seen as an important event in Anglican history, ultimately laying the foundations for the concept of "via media" in Anglicanism.

The nature of early Anglicanism was to be of great importance to the Anglo-Catholics of the 19th century, who would argue that their beliefs and practices were common during this period and were inoffensive to the earliest members of the Church of England.

=== Conformist views ===
In the early history of Anglicanism, various clerics documented the elaborate liturgy celebrated in the Lutheran churches to advance the same in the Church of England. In Two dialogues, or conferences Concerning kneeling in the very act of receiving the sacramental bread and wine, in the Supper of the Lord, Anglican cleric Thomas Rogers referenced the Mass of the Lutheran churches to defend the liturgy of the Book of Common Prayer, assembled by the reformer Thomas Cranmer: "For all the Churches in Basel, Saxony, Denmark, and many in Germany, by the orders of their several churches at the communion, as well as we in England, do kneel."

During the Stuart Restoration, Anglican cleric John Durel appealed to the Lutheran liturgy for the presence of ceremony in the Church of England:

As for the public Worship of God, they have all of them set Forms of Prayer, not one excepted, some differing from ours, some being in a manner the same. They observe Holy days; they have set Times for fasting; they have very magnificent and stately Buildings very richly adorned for their Churches. They sing not only Psalms, but many Hymns and spiritual songs, whereof some were anciently used in the Church, and some are of Luther's own making: And they sing them with Organs and other instruments of Music. They sing Anthems in the same manner that we do. In many places they wear Surplices and other Church-Ornaments. They use the Cross in Baptism; they receive the Communion kneeling. In fine, they have Conformity with us in all Rites of Divine Worship, and yet in all these no Idolatry nor Superstition, according to the judgement of the French Reformed Churches (Section I.3).

In 1715, Sir William Dawes, 3rd Baronet noted that the "Lutheran religion...[goes] much farther; and are not only more abundant in their Ceremonies, but in the Pomp and Splendor of their Churches where Images and Pictures of Saints and Holy Men are expos'd to publick View on purpose to excite the frequenters of those Sacred Places to the Imitation of their Examples."

=== Caroline Divines ===
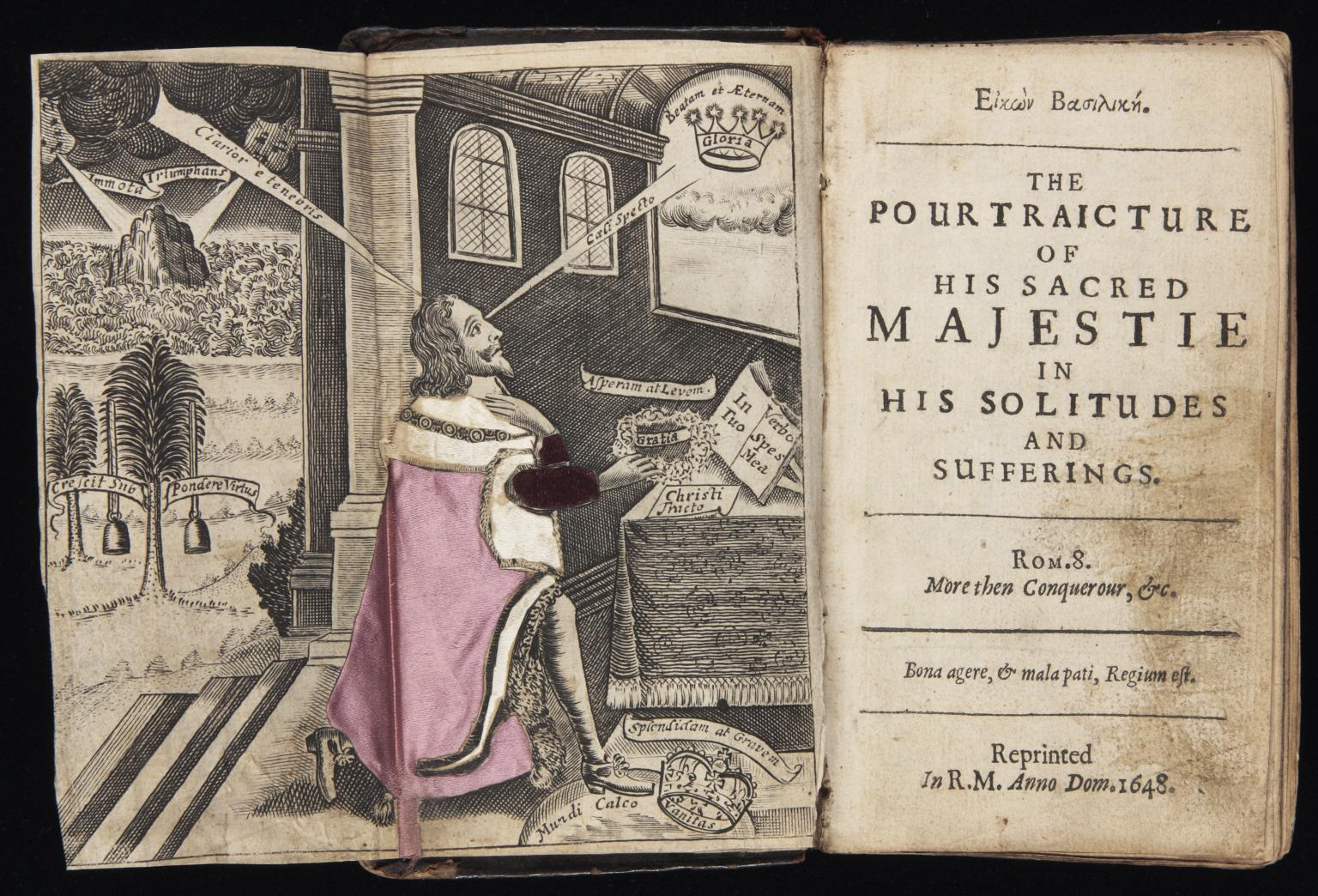
King Charles the Martyr on the title page of his supposed book Eikon Basilike, 1649, a key Anglo-Catholic text

The Caroline Divines were a group of influential Anglican theologians active in the 17th century who opposed Calvinism, Lutheranism, and Puritanism and stressed the importance of apostolic succession, episcopal polity, and the sacraments. The Caroline Divines also favoured elaborate liturgy (in some cases favouring the liturgy of the pre-Reformation church) and aesthetics. Their influence saw a revival in the use of images and statues in churches. The leaders of the Anglo-Catholic revival in the 19th century would draw heavily from the works of the Caroline Divines.

=== Oxford Movement ===
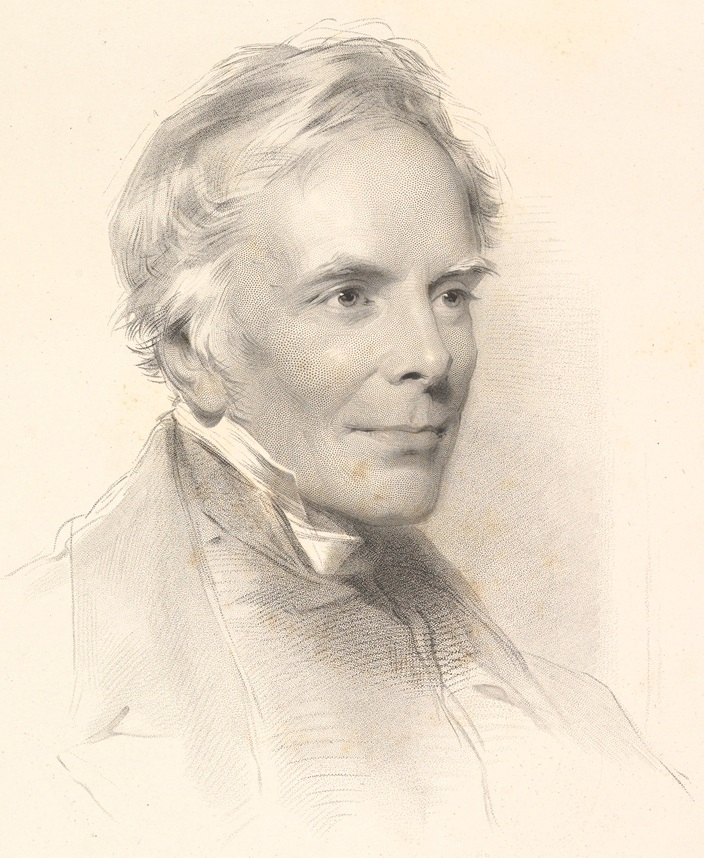
John Keble, priest and poet, was a prominent leader in the Oxford Movement, promoting Anglo-Catholic theology.

The modern Anglo-Catholic movement began with the Oxford Movement in the Victorian era, sometimes termed "Tractarianism". In the early 19th century, various factors caused misgivings among English church people, including the decline of church life and the spread of unconventional practices in the Church of England. The British government's action in 1833 of beginning a reduction in the number of Church of Ireland bishoprics and archbishoprics inspired a sermon from John Keble in the University Church in Oxford on the subject of "National Apostasy". This sermon marked the inception of what became known as the Oxford Movement.

The principal objective of the Oxford Movement was the defence of the Church of England as a divinely founded institution, of the doctrine of apostolic succession, and of the Book of Common Prayer as a "rule of faith". The key idea was that Anglicanism was not a Protestant denomination but a branch of the historical Christian Church, along with the Roman Catholic and Eastern Orthodox churches. It was argued that Anglicanism had preserved the historical apostolic succession of priests and bishops, and thus the Catholic sacraments. These ideas were promoted in a series of ninety "Tracts for the Times", but were rejected both by the Roman Catholic and Eastern Orthodox churches.

The principal leaders of the Oxford Movement were John Keble, John Henry Newman, and Edward Bouverie Pusey. The movement gained influential support, but it was also attacked by some bishops of the church and by the latitudinarians within the University of Oxford, who believed in conforming to official Church of England practices but who felt that matters of doctrine, liturgical practice, and ecclesiastical organisation were of relatively little importance. Within the Oxford Movement, there gradually arose a much smaller group which tended towards submission to the supremacy of the Roman Catholic Church.

In 1845, the university censured a tract entitled Ideal of a Christian Church and its author, the pro-Roman Catholic theologian W. G. Ward, on which basis was imputed the moniker "Ideal Ward". In 1850, evangelical cleric George Cornelius Gorham had victory in a celebrated legal action against church authorities. Consequently, some Anglicans of Anglo-Catholic churchmanship were received into the Roman Catholic Church, while others, such as Mark Pattison, embraced Latitudinarian Anglicanism, and yet others, such as James Anthony Froude, became skeptics.

The majority of adherents of the movement remained in the Church of England and, despite hostility in the press and in government, the movement spread. Its liturgical practices were influential, as were its social achievements (including its missions in slums) and its revival of male and female monasticism within Anglicanism.

=== Recent developments ===
Since at least the 1970s, Anglo-Catholicism has been dividing into two distinct camps, along a fault line which can perhaps be traced back to Bishop Charles Gore's work in the 19th century.

The Oxford Movement had been inspired in the first place by a rejection of liberalism and latitudinarianism in favour of the traditional faith of the "Church Catholic", defined by the teachings of the Church Fathers and the common doctrines of the historical Eastern and Western Christian traditions.

Because of the emphasis on upholding traditions, until the 1970s most Anglo-Catholics rejected liberalising development such as the conferral of holy orders on women. Present-day "traditionalist" Anglo-Catholics seek to maintain tradition and to keep Anglican doctrine in line with that of the Roman Catholic and Eastern Orthodox churches. They often ally themselves with conservative evangelical Anglicans to defend traditional teachings on sexual morality and women's roles in the Church. The main organisation in the Church of England that opposes the ordination of women, Forward in Faith, is largely composed of Anglo-Catholics.

Gore's work, however, bearing the mark of liberal Protestant higher criticism, paved the way for an alternative form of Anglo-Catholicism influenced by liberal theology. Thus in recent years, many Anglo-Catholics have accepted the ordination of women, the use of inclusive language in Bible translations and the liturgy, and progressive attitudes towards homosexuality and the blessing of same sex unions. Such Anglicans often refer to themselves as "Liberal Catholics". This more "progressive" style of Anglo-Catholicism is represented by Affirming Catholicism and the Society of Catholic Priests, although, unlike Forward in Faith, this organisation is not as visible with the laity.

A third strand of Anglican Catholicism criticises elements of both liberalism and conservatism, drawing instead on the 20th-century Catholic Nouvelle Théologie, especially Henri de Lubac. This movement rejected the dominance of Thomism and Neo-Scholasticism in Catholic theology and advocated instead for a "return to the sources" of the Christian faith – scripture and the writings of the Church Fathers –, while remaining open to dialogue with the contemporary world on issues of theology. John Milbank and others within this strand have been instrumental in the creation of the ecumenical (though predominantly Anglican and Roman Catholic) movement known as radical orthodoxy.

Since the 1970s, some traditionalist Anglo-Catholics have left official Anglicanism to form "continuing Anglican churches" whereas others have left Anglicanism altogether for the Roman Catholic or Eastern Orthodox churches, in the belief that liberal doctrinal changes in the Anglican churches have gone too far.

=== Personal ordinariates ===
In late 2009, in response to requests from various groups of Anglicans around the world who were dissatisfied with liberalising movements within the Anglican Communion, Pope Benedict XVI issued the apostolic constitution Anglicanorum Coetibus. This document invites groups of traditionalist Anglicans to form what are termed "personal ordinariates" under the ecclesiastical jurisdiction of the Holy See of the Catholic Church in Rome, while preserving elements of the liturgical, musical, theological and other aspects of their Anglican patrimony.

Under these terms, regional groupings of Anglican Catholics may apply for reception by the Holy See under the jurisdiction of an "ordinary" (i.e. a bishop or priest (Note: In the Roman Catholic Church in general, ordinaries are supposed to be bishops, or at least episcopal vicars, but this condition was relaxed for personal ordinariates so as to allow married former Anglican bishops to become ordinaries: while priests in personal ordinariates may be married, bishops may not, as this is the general rule in both the Roman Catholic and Orthodox churches. Therefore, married Anglican bishops or priests converting to Roman Catholicism receive priestly ordination but cannot become Roman Catholic bishops afterwards.)) appointed by Rome to oversee the community. While being in a country or region which is part of the Latin Church of the Roman Catholic Church, these ordinaries will nonetheless retain aspects of the Anglican patrimony, such as married priests and traditional English choral music and liturgy. Because apostolic constitutions are the highest level of papal legislation and are not time-limited, the invitation is open into the indefinite future.

The first personal ordinariate, the Personal Ordinariate of Our Lady of Walsingham, was established on 15 January 2011 in the United Kingdom. The second Anglican ordinariate, known as the Personal Ordinariate of the Chair of Saint Peter, was established on 1 January 2012 in the United States. The already existing Anglican Use parishes in the United States, which have existed since the 1980s, formed a portion of the first American personal ordinariate.

These parishes were already in communion with Rome and use modified Anglican liturgies approved by the Holy See. They were joined by other groups and parishes of Episcopalians and some other Anglicans. A third Anglican ordinariate, known as the Personal Ordinariate of Our Lady of the Southern Cross, was established on 15 June 2012 in Australia. The "Catechism of the Catholic Church is the authoritative expression of the Catholic faith professed by members" of the personal ordinariates.

== Practices and beliefs ==
=== Theology ===
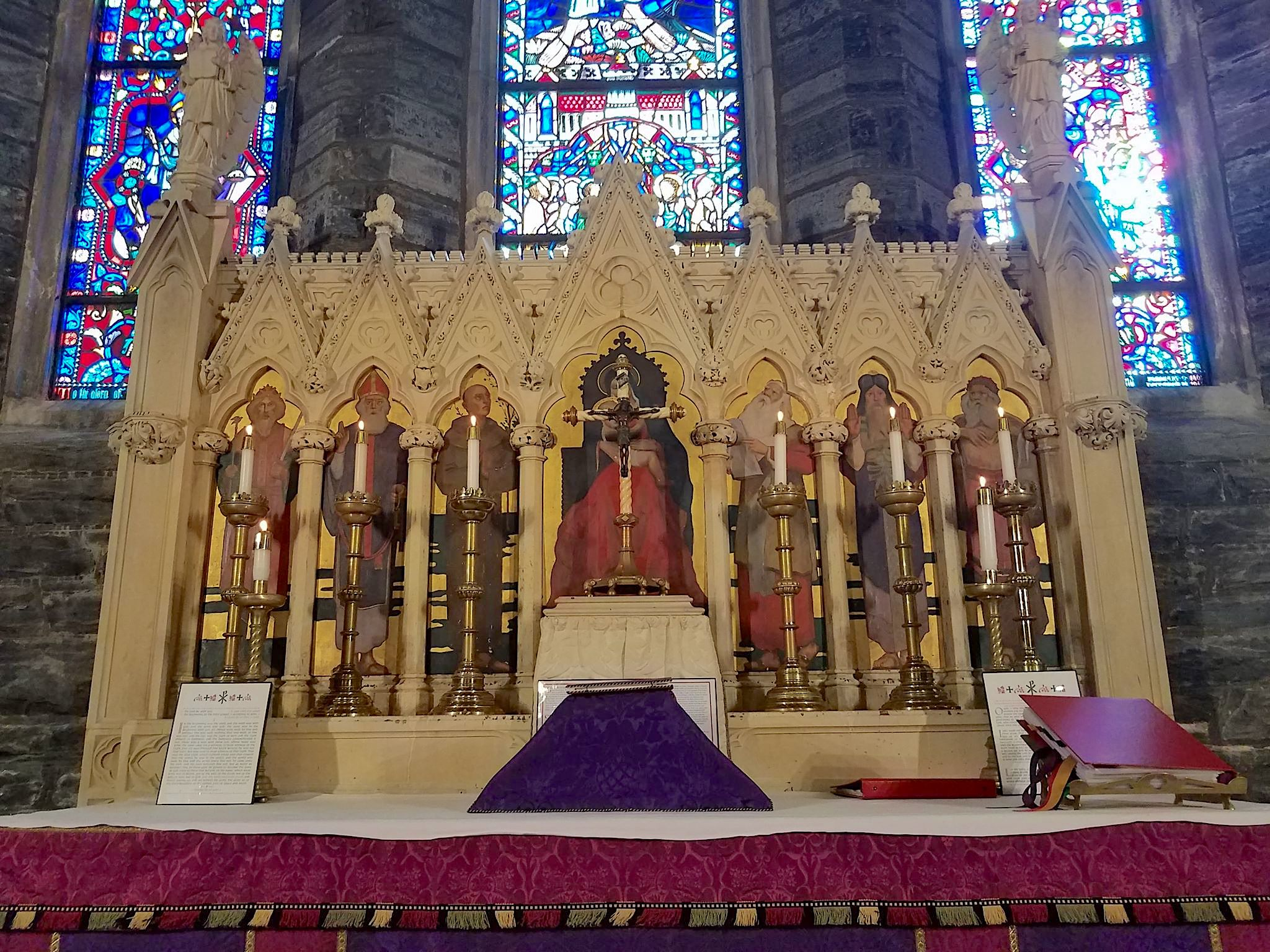
High altar and reredos, Church of the Good Shepherd (Rosemont, Pennsylvania)

Historically, Anglo-Catholics have valued "highly the tradition of the early, undivided Church, they saw its authority as co-extensive with Scripture. They re-emphasised the Church's institutional history and form. Anglo-Catholicism was emotionally intense, and yet drawn to aspects of the pre-Reformation Church, including the revival of religious orders, the reintroduction of the language and symbolism of the eucharistic sacrifice," and "the revival of private confession. Its spirituality was Evangelical, but High Church in content and form."

At the same time, Anglo-Catholics held that "the Roman Catholic has corrupted the original ritualism; and she [the Anglican Church] claims that the ritualism which she presents is a revival in purity of the original ritualism of the Catholic Church." The spirituality of Anglo-Catholics is drawn largely from the teachings of the early church, in addition to the Caroline Divines.

In 1572, Archbishop of Canterbury Matthew Parker published De Antiquitate Britannicæ Ecclesiæ, which traced the roots of the Anglican Church, arguing "that the early British Church differed from Roman Catholicism in key points and thus provided an alternative model for patristic Christianity," a view repeated by many Anglo-Catholics such as Charles Chapman Grafton, Bishop of the Diocese of Fond du Lac. In addition, Anglo-Catholics hold that the Anglican churches have maintained "catholicity and apostolicity." In the same vein, Anglo-Catholics emphasise the doctrines of apostolic succession and the threefold order, holding that these were retained by the Anglican Church after it went through the English Reformation.

In agreement with the Eastern Orthodox and Oriental Orthodox churches, Anglo-Catholics—along with Old-Catholics and Lutherans—generally appeal to the "canon" (or rule) of St Vincent of Lerins: "What everywhere, what always, and what by all has been believed, that is truly and properly Catholic."

The Anglican Thirty-nine Articles make distinctions between Anglican and Catholic understandings of doctrine; in the eyes of Anglo-Catholics, the Thirty-nine Articles are catholic, containing statements that profess the universal faith of the early church. As the Articles were intentionally written in such a way as to be open to a range of interpretations, Anglo-Catholics have defended their practices and beliefs as being consistent with the Thirty-nine Articles, for example in Newman's Tract 90 of 1841. Since the late 20th century, Anglo-Catholic thought related to the Thirty-nine Articles has included the New Perspective on Paul.

Anglo-Catholic priests often hear private confessions and anoint the sick, regarding these practices as sacraments. Anglo-Catholics also offer prayers for the departed and the intercession of the saints; C. S. Lewis, often considered an Anglo-Catholic in his theological sensibilities, writes:

Of course I pray for the dead. The action is so spontaneous, so all but inevitable, that only the most compulsive theological case against it would deter me. And I hardly know how the rest of my prayers would survive if those for the dead were forbidden. At our age, the majority of those we love best are dead. What sort of intercourse with God could I have if what I love best were unmentionable to Him?

— Letters to Malcolm: Chiefly on Prayer, pp. 107–109

Anglicans of Anglo-Catholic churchmanship also believe in the real objective presence of Christ in the Eucharist and understand the way He is manifest in the sacrament to be a mystery of faith. Like the Eastern Orthodox and Lutherans, Anglo-Catholics, with the exception of the minority of Anglican Papalists, reject the Catholic doctrines of the papal supremacy and papal infallibility, with Walter Herbert Stowe, an Anglo-Catholic cleric, explaining the Anglican position on these issues:

Anglo-Catholics reject all these claims except that of Primacy on the following grounds: (i) There is no evidence in Scripture or anywhere else that Christ conferred these powers upon St. Peter; (2) there is no evidence that St. Peter claimed them for himself or his successors; (3) there is strong contrary evidence that St. Peter erred in an important matter of faith in Antioch, the eating together and social intercourse of Jewish and Gentile Christians affecting the whole future of the Church and the Christian Religion, and this lapse was so serious that St. Paul withstood him to the face; (4) he did not preside at the first Council of the Church in Jerusalem and did not hand down the decision of the Council; (5) he was Bishop of Antioch before he was bishop anywhere else, and, if the papal claims are in any way true, the Bishop of Antioch has a better right to hold them; (6) that St. Peter was ever in Rome is disputed, and the most that can be said for it is that it is an interesting historical problem; (7) there is no evidence whatsoever that he conferred such powers upon his successors-to-be in the See of Rome; (8) there was no primitive acceptance of such claims, and there never has been universal acceptance in any later age.

However, Anglo-Catholics share with Catholics a belief in the sacramental nature of the priesthood and in the sacrificial character of the Mass. A minority of Anglo-Catholics also encourage priestly celibacy. Most Anglo-Catholics, due to the silence of the Thirty-Nine Articles on the issue, encourage devotion to the Virgin Mary, but not all Anglo-Catholics adhere to a high doctrine of Mariology; in England, her title of Our Lady of Walsingham is popular.

=== Liturgical practices ===
Anglo-Catholics are often identified by their liturgical practices and ornaments. These have traditionally been characterised by the "six points" of the later Catholic Revival's eucharistic practice:

- Eucharistic vestments
- Eastward-facing orientation of the priest at the altar instead of at the north side, the traditional evangelical Anglican practice
- Unleavened bread for the Eucharist
- Mixing of water with the eucharistic wine
- Incense
- Lights (altar candles)

Many other traditional Catholic practices are observed within Anglo-Catholicism, including eucharistic adoration. Some of these Anglo-Catholic "innovations" have since been accepted by broad church Anglicans, if not by Evangelical or low church Anglicans.

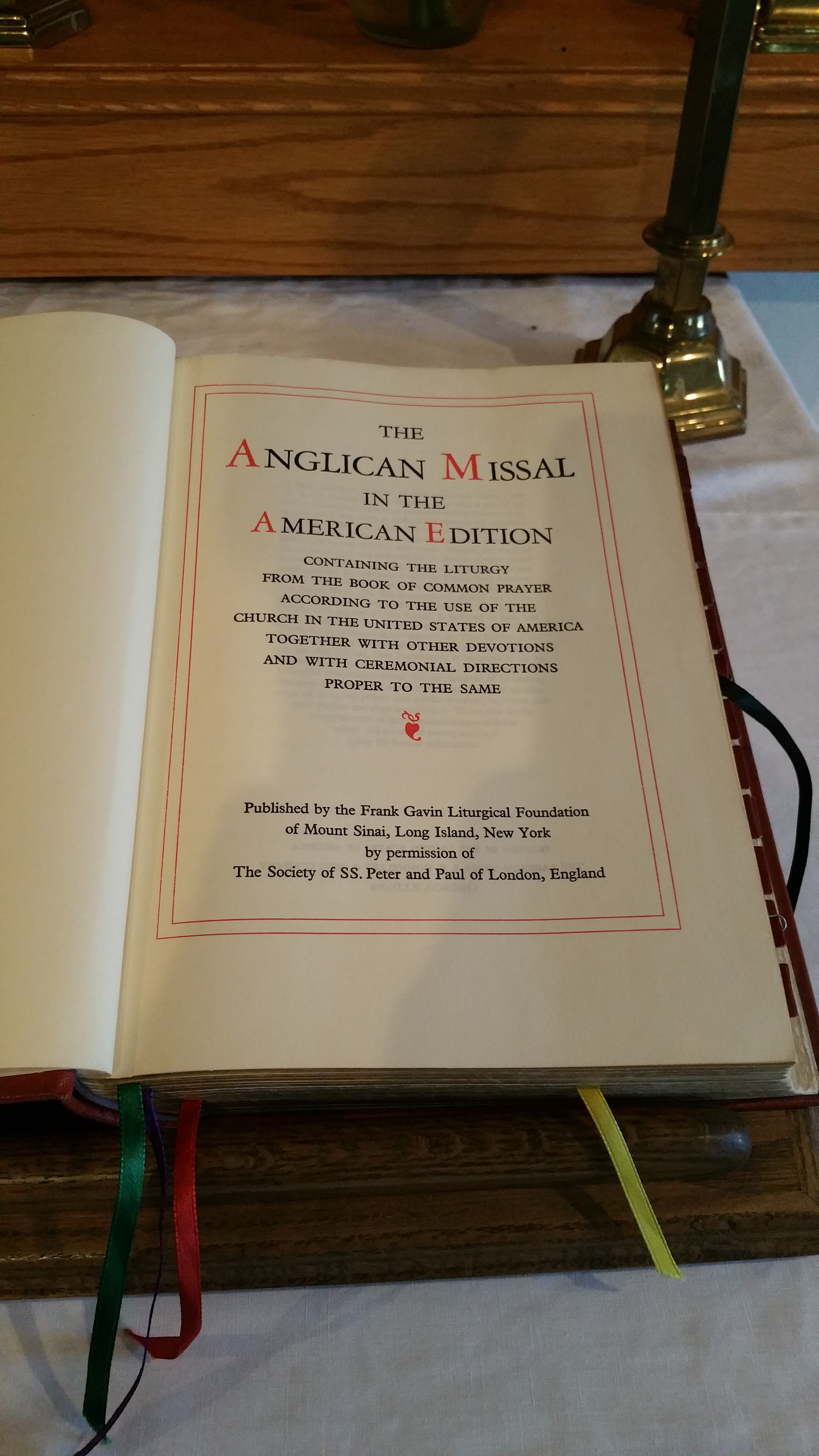
The Anglican Missal sitting on an altar desk

Various liturgical strands exist within Anglo-Catholicism:

- Some, such as the original members of the Oxford Movement, use official Anglican liturgical texts such as the Book of Common Prayer.
- Some use the contemporary Catholic rite of Mass.
- Some use the older "Tridentine" Catholic rite of Mass, in English or Latin, or liturgies based on it, such as the English Missal or Anglican Missal.
- Some occasionally use the mediaeval English Sarum Rite, which is broadly similar to the Tridentine Mass, in English or Latin.

Preferences for Elizabethan English and modern English texts vary within the movement.

In the United States, a group of Anglo-Catholics at the Episcopal Church of the Good Shepherd (Rosemont, Pennsylvania) published, under the rubrics of the 1979 Book of Common Prayer, the Anglican Service Book as "a traditional-language adaptation of the 1979 Book of Common Prayer together with the Psalter or Psalms of David and additional devotions." This book is based on the 1979 Book of Common Prayer but includes offices and devotions in the traditional language of the 1928 Prayer Book that are not in the 1979 edition. The book also draws from sources such as the Anglican Missal.

In many Anglo-Catholic churches, clergy are referred to as "Father", and in places where the priestly ministry of women is accepted, as "Mother".

== See also ==
- American Church Union
- Anglican Breviary
- Anglican devotional society
- Anglican sacraments
- Catholic societies of the Church of England
- Evangelical Catholic
- High Church Lutheranism
- Liberal Anglo-Catholicism
- List of Anglo-Catholic churches
- Liturgical Movement
- Neo-Lutheranism
- Ritualism in the Church of England
