= Catholic–Protestant relations =

- Separations: Reformation (16th century)
- Members: Catholic: 1.313 billion (2017, self-declared); Protestant: 1.17 billion (2024)

Catholic–Protestant relations refers to the social, political and theological relations and dialogue between Roman Catholic Christians and Protestant Christians.

This relationship began in the 16th century with the beginning of the Reformation and thereby Protestantism. A number of factors contributed to the Protestant Reformation – namely, disagreement on the nature of salvation and by extension a number of doctrines including the sale of indulgences and more. These disputes led to a schism whereby Protestants chose to split from the Roman Catholic Church, though often still defining themselves as catholic churches, and resulted in the Council of Trent (1545–1563) which clarified the Catholic approach to Protestantism from then on, declaring all forms of Protestantism heretical. A series of significant events followed which divided Europe and culminated in a number of states transitioning from Catholicism to Protestantism as their state religion. However, many remained Catholic, and some areas reverted to the Catholic religion as a result of the Counter-Reformation. Much of the schism and the events it caused can be categorised as violent and tumultuous. The work of the Second Vatican Council in the early 1960s recommended terms such as separated brethren to foster a greater emphasis on Christian unity.

== Theological disputes ==
Catholic–Protestant theological dissent was birthed in 1517 with the posting of Martin Luther's Ninety-five Theses which outline ninety-five objections against Catholic doctrine. These included distinction between clergy and laity, the Catholic Church's monopoly on scriptural interpretation, the sale of indulgences, the nature of salvation, and more.

=== Salvation ===
Luther's understanding of salvation was one of the radical departures from Catholic dogma. Luther highlighted that Christian salvation was a free gift from God which led him to criticise the sale of indulgences as a means by which one can attain heaven. He stressed the importance of a faith-oriented process of salvation, distinct from his view of the Catholic works-oriented salvation. This also led to a shift in the understanding of grace. This Protestant doctrine is known as sola fide ("faith alone").

French attorney John Calvin developed the Reformed theology of salvation. While Luther maintained that salvation was available to all, Calvin introduced the doctrine of predestination. Based on the idea of human's sin-enslaved will, and salvation being the sole work of God (not man), Calvin insisted that certain individuals were predestined for heaven and others were not.

=== Authority ===
A significant foundation for both parties' doctrines is the nature of their authority. The Protestant positions consists in either holding scripture to be the sole foundation of Christian doctrine (as with e.g. Lutheranism), or holding that scripture is the primary source of Christian doctrine (as with e.g. Anglicanism and Methodism). This has led to heavy criticism of the Catholic Church's position which places scripture on par with Sacred Tradition, with Catholics considering both as divinely revealed and binding.

== History ==
=== 16th century – The Reformation ===
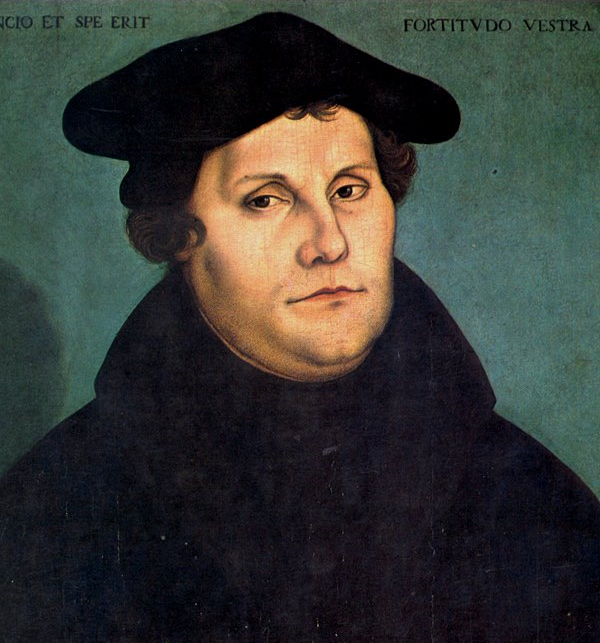
Martin Luther, 1529

The 16th century began the Reformation which resulted in the formation of Protestantism as a distinct entity to Catholicism. In response, the Catholic Church began its own reformation process known as the "Counter-Reformation" which culminated in the Council of Trent. This council was responsible for several practical changes and doctrinal clarifications. In spite of this, the two parties remained notably dissimilar.

After years of the spread of Martin Luther's ideas, Protestants submitted their statement of belief at the Diet of Augsburg (1530).

In 1540 Pope Paul III approved the order of the Society of Jesus (or "Jesuits") which was created largely to combat Protestantism.

The Regensburg Reconciliation (1541) was a failed attempt by Catholics and Lutheran Protestants to reunite.

The "traditionally Roman" nations of France, Spain and Italy endured the Roman Inquisitions as of 1542. The inquisitions were aimed at all those considered heretical by the Catholic Church but predominately targeted Protestants as it was the most prominent. Technically the Church itself never executed heretics (as Canon Law forbade the shedding of blood). Rather, heretics were handed over to civil authorities for punishment.

Disputes between the Catholic Emperor of Germany and the princes thereof resulted in the Schmalkaldic War (1547). Protestants were defeated, but later on Protestantism became legally recognised as a valid religion.

In 1555 the Peace of Augsburg allowed Catholics and Lutherans to follow the faith of their ruler – regardless of what that may be – within Germany.

==== France ====
The Reformation in France took on a unique flavour which lacked the public, State and church support found elsewhere in Europe. The first French Protestants were subject to persecution in the form of death or exile. From 1562 conflict raged between the Protestant Huguenots and Catholics. In 1589, Protestant Henry IV succeeded the throne raising the hopes of French Protestants. However, any reforms he may have intended to make were shattered by an alliance between French Catholics and the king of Spain who forced him to convert. The 1598 Edict of Nantes gave Huguenots the right to practice freely while retaining Catholicism as the nation's official religion.

==== Netherlands ====
The Netherlands was quick to embrace the Reformation and soon assumed a Protestant identity. Though it faced opposition by its ruling power, Spain, the Dutch independence movement dispelled with Spanish imposition and allowed for Protestant development.

==== Nordic countries ====
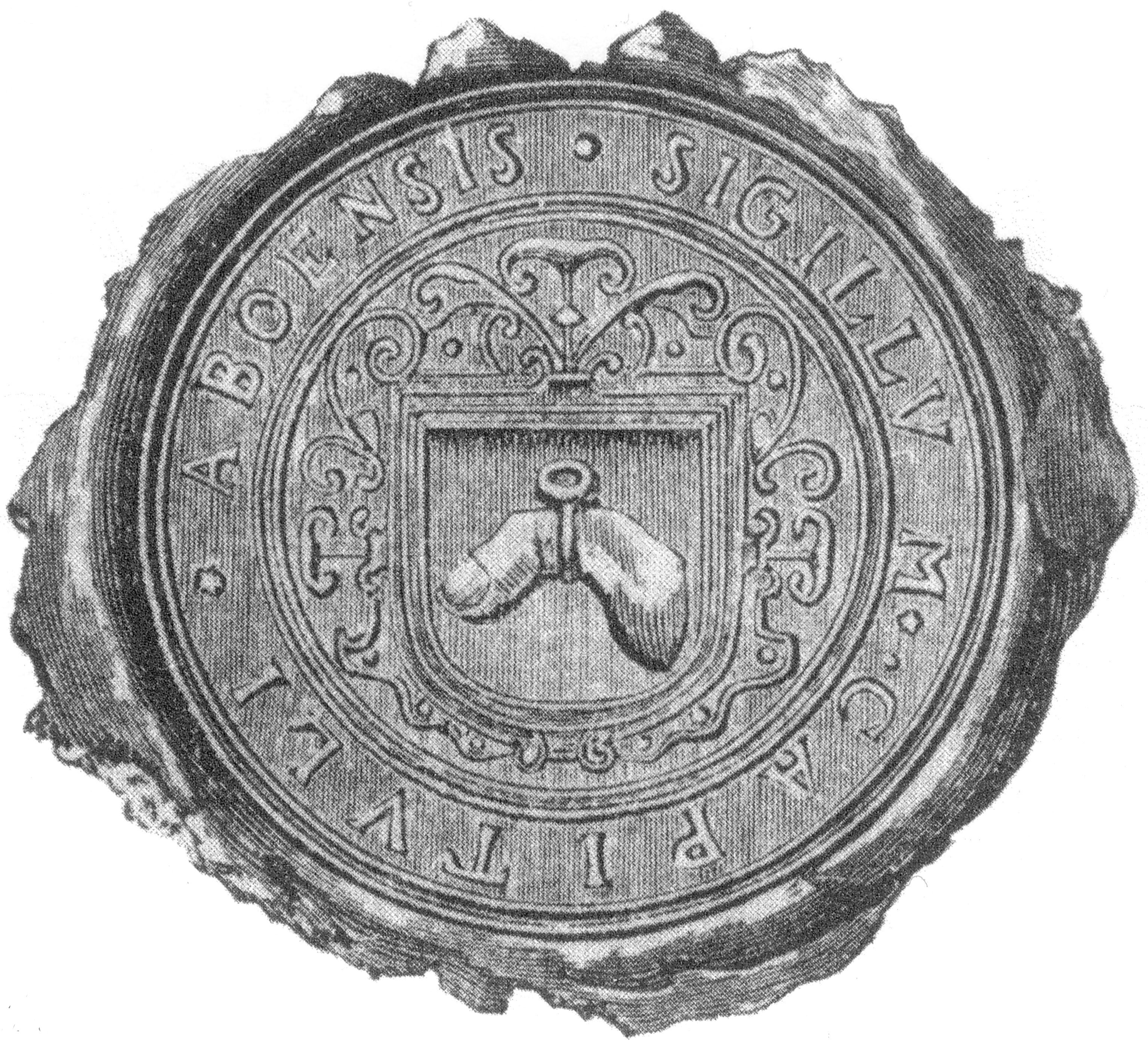
The seal of the Diocese of Turku (Finland) during the 16th and 17th centuries featured the finger of St Henry. The post-Reformation diocese included the relic of a pre-Reformation saint in its seal.

All of Scandinavia ultimately adopted Lutheranism over the course of the 16th century, as the monarchs of Denmark (who also ruled Norway and Iceland) and Sweden (who also ruled Finland) converted to that faith.

===== Sweden =====
In Sweden, the Reformation was spearheaded by Gustav Vasa, elected king in 1523, with major contributions by Olaus Petri, a Swedish clergyman. Friction with the pope over the latter's interference in Swedish ecclesiastical affairs led to the discontinuance of any official connection between Sweden and the papacy since 1523. Four years later, at the Diet of Västerås, the king succeeded in forcing the diet to accept his dominion over the national church. The king was given possession of all church property, church appointments required royal approval, the clergy were subject to the civil law, and the "pure Word of God" was to be preached in the churches and taught in the schools—effectively granting official sanction to Lutheran ideas. The apostolic succession was retained in Sweden during the Reformation. The adoption of Lutheranism was also one of the main reasons for the eruption of the Dacke War, a peasants uprising in Småland.

In 2016, Pope Francis traveled to Lund, Sweden, where he took part in the celebration given for the upcoming of the 500th anniversary of the Reformation. The next year, the press of the Vatican released a stamp to commemorate the 500th anniversary of the Reformation; the stamp depicts Luther and Melanchton kneeling before a crucified Jesus.

===== Denmark =====
Under the reign of Frederick I (1523–33), Denmark remained officially Catholic. Frederick initially pledged to persecute Lutherans, yet he quickly adopted a policy of protecting Lutheran preachers and reformers, of whom the most famous was Hans Tausen. During his reign, Lutheranism made significant inroads among the Danish population. In 1526, Frederick forbade papal investiture of bishops in Denmark and in 1527 ordered fees from new bishops be paid to the crown, making Frederick the head of the church of Denmark. Frederick's son, Christian, was openly Lutheran, which prevented his election to the throne upon his father's death. In 1536, following his victory in the Count's War, he became king as Christian III and continued the Reformation of the state church with assistance from Johannes Bugenhagen. By the Copenhagen recess of October 1536, the authority of the Catholic bishops was terminated.

===== Iceland =====
Luther's influence had already reached Iceland before King Christian's decree. The Germans fished near Iceland's coast, and the Hanseatic League engaged in commerce with the Icelanders. These Germans raised a Lutheran church in Hafnarfjörður as early as 1533. Through German trade connections, many young Icelanders studied in Hamburg. In 1538, when the kingly decree of the new Church ordinance reached Iceland, bishop Ögmundur Pálsson and his clergy denounced it, threatening excommunication for anyone subscribing to the German "heresy". In 1539, the King sent a new governor to Iceland, Klaus von Mervitz, with a mandate to introduce reform and take possession of church property. Von Mervitz seized a monastery in Viðey with the help of his sheriff, Dietrich of Minden, and his soldiers. They drove the monks out and seized all their possessions, for which they were promptly excommunicated by Ögmundur.

==== United Kingdom ====
England and Scotland endured the longest of the European transformations in response to the Reformation. Henry VIII declared himself Head of the Church of England (1534) in response to Rome's refusal to sanction the annulment of his marriage to Queen Catherine. He still, however, died a Catholic. Officially, the English Reformation began under Edward VI (1547–1553) led by Archbishop Thomas Cranmer of Canterbury. Queen Mary (1553–1558) persecuted Protestants in an attempt to restore Catholicism to England. Ironically, this only served to enhance Protestant determination. Following this trend, Elizabeth solidified Protestantism as the state religion of England permanently. Overall, the Reformation led to the seizing of all Catholic Church assets in Britain, persecution of clergy, and the virtual destruction of Catholicism as a significant socio-political force in the region.

=== 17th century ===
In 1618 the Dutch War of Independence ended and Catholic Spain ceased to rule over the region. Much of this war is considered to be on religious grounds.

The 17th century saw Protestant-Catholic tensions rise particularly in Germany leading to the Thirty Years War from 1618 to 1648. This war saw the destruction of much of Central Europe and divided much of the continent along Catholic-Protestant lines. Swedes, Danes, and French were all involved. The war culminated in the Treaty of Westphalia (1648) which granted Calvinists and Lutherans equal rights to Catholics.

New Englanders were deeply suspicious of Catholicism and in 1647 banished all Catholic clergymen by law. In 1689 the Maryland Assembly forbade Catholic baptism outside of already Catholic households, the practicing of Catholic mass, and more.

In 1685 king Louis XIV revoked the Edict of Nantes thought the Edict of Fontainebleau leading to the prosecution of Protestants in France.

=== 18th century ===
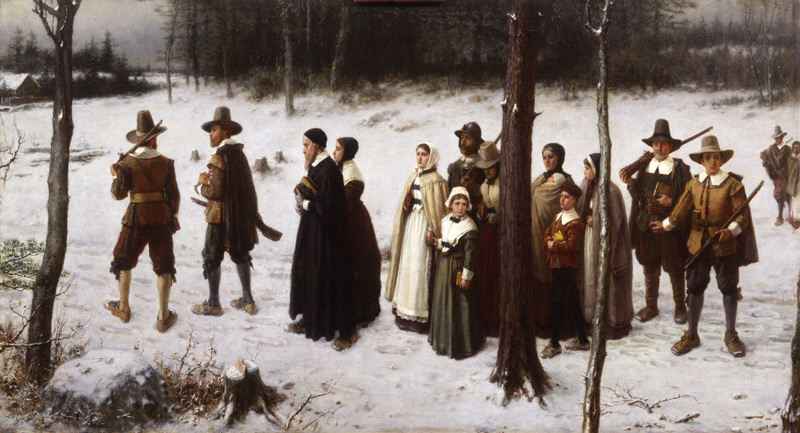
Pilgrims Going to Church, a 1867 depiction of Puritans in the New England Colonies, by George Henry Boughton.

The British Empire and its colonies in North America remained apprehensive towards the Roman Catholic Church; Protestant settlers in British North America were particularly hostile. As of 1700, Roman Catholic clergymen immigrating to the Thirteen Colonies were imprisoned upon arrival in New England. In 1725 Spanish-born Londoner Antonio Gavin wrote A Master Key to Popery which was adopted in Protestant sects across the British Empire. Gavin described Roman Catholic clergymen as "wolves in sheep's clothing", purposefully teaching erroneous doctrine, power-hungry, and more. Similar sentiments were preached throughout the colonies of the British Empire in the legal, academic, and religious spheres. In 1731, Massachusetts Supreme Court Judge Paul Dudley wrote An Essay on the Merchandize of Slaves and Souls of Men: With Application thereof to the Church of Rome describing the financial greed of the Roman Catholic Church. Among others, Dudley's will made provisions for a lecture on the "detection, conviction and exposition of Roman Church idolatry". Jonathan Mayhew, pastor of Boston's West Church, also preached on the idolatry of transubstantiation and the equating of the oral tradition of the Roman Catholic Church with the scriptural authority of the Bible.

The late 18th century saw a series of new laws introduced to British North America to curtail the immigration of Roman Catholics and dispossess those already dwelling there. Opposition towards Roman Catholicism soon became intertwined with American nationalism; in 1757, Roman Catholics were deprived of their right to bear arms. Thus, when conspiracies of secret relations between the Roman Catholic Church and the British Monarchy spread, British-ruled colonists preferred to revolt against the Crown, thus starting the American Revolution (1765–1783). However, the revolutionaries eventually diverged from this position, given their reliance on funding from the Kingdom of France, and to avoid conflict with the French colonial settlements of Maryland, Philadelphia, and Quebec. In contrast, the Quebec Act of 1774 provided protections for both English Protestants and French Roman Catholics in Canada.

=== 19th century ===
The 1800s saw a period known as the Second Great Awakening for Protestantism in the United States. Prominent figures such as Charles Grandison Finney (1792–1875) denounced Roman Catholicism and other perceived evils. The American Bible Society – a Protestant organisation – advocated for the unification of Protestant denominations in order to combat Catholicism. Deep distrust existed among Protestants towards the Papacy.

In 1821 and again in 1825, the English House of Commons oversaw proposed bills regarding the emancipation of Catholics. In both instances, they were overturned given the heavily Protestant nature of the England's House of Lords.

Catholic Austria recognised Protestantism as a legal religion in the 1860s.

In 1871 the Protestant rulers of Germany undertook a program known as the kulturkampf (culture struggle) which saw the suppression of German Catholicism. The German Ministry for Education's Catholic Bureau was abolished, and openly political priests were prosecuted. In 1872, the Jesuits were expelled from Germany.

In 1895 Pope Leo XIII attempted to make amends with the Church of England in his apostolic letter Ad Anglos. In 1896, however, Leo maintained Catholic superiority and declared Anglican orders invalid in his bull Apostolicae curae.

=== 20th century ===
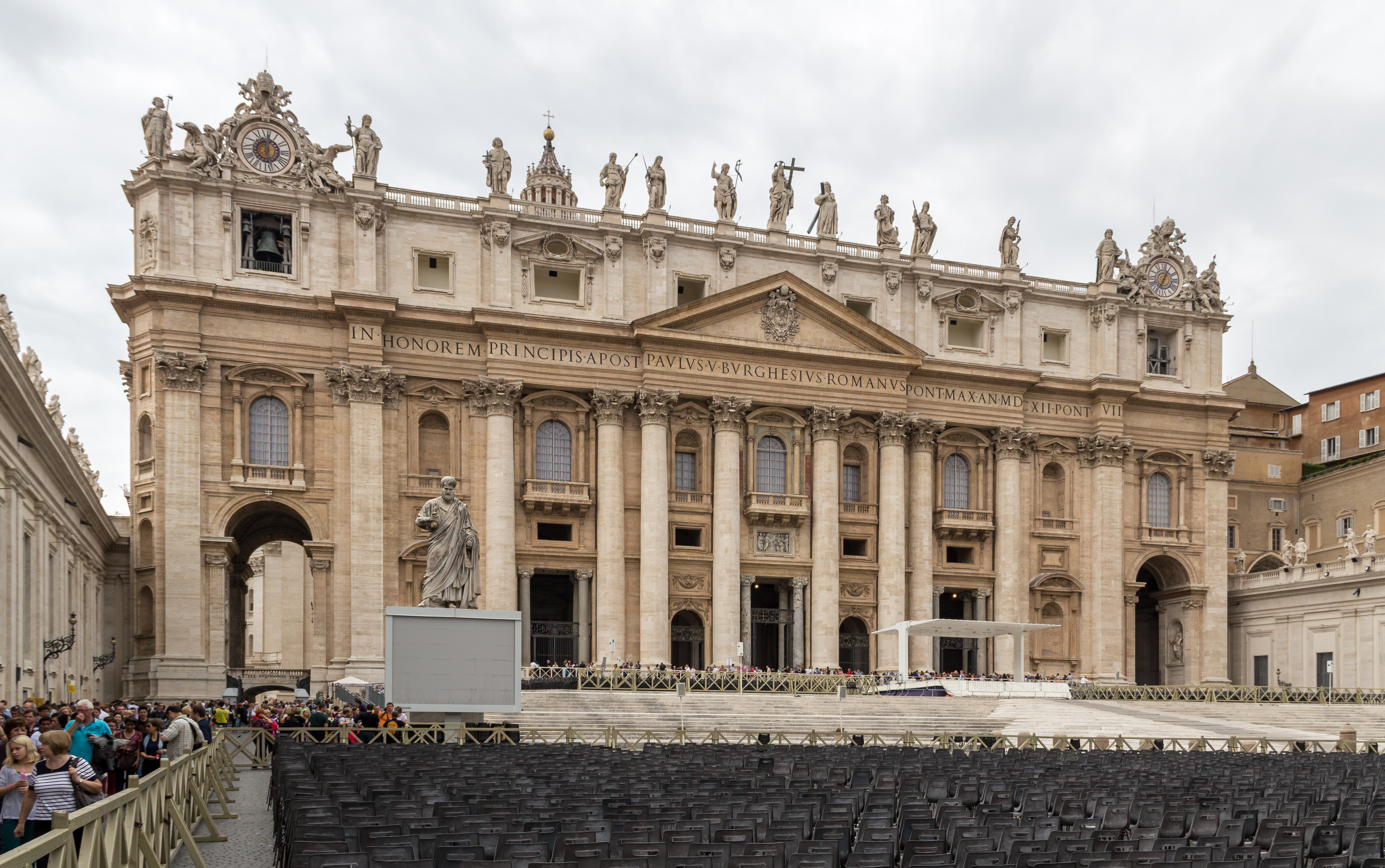
St. Peter's Basilica, Vatican City

The 20th century saw many developments in the relationship between Catholic-Protestant relations. In 1910, the International Missionary Conference was held in Edinburgh in an attempt to unify non-Roman churches. Protestant denominations responded to the possibility of unification with varying success. Catholic representatives were present at the council, but merely as observers.

The Conversations at Malines (1923–27) were talks between some representatives of the Catholic Church and the Church of England which Pope Pius XI ceased. No real change eventuated from these talks.

In 1950 the Roman Catholic Church widened the gap between itself and Protestantism by defining and enforcing the doctrine of the Assumption of Mary under Pius XII.

The Second Vatican Council (1962–65) aimed to move towards Christian unity of all denominations. Doctrinal unity was reached to some degree with different denominations and a "shared Bible" (Note: Possibly the Italian Bibbia CEI; it was planned to be released as a common Bible for Catholics and Protestants, but due to difficulties it came out as Bible approved only by Catholics. The author, Tim Dowley, does not say which Bible he is talking about.) was introduced.

=== 21st century ===
Largest religious and non-religious group by EU member state according to Eurobarometer survey 2019. More than 75% Catholic 50–75% Catholic Relative Catholic majority 50–75% Protestant More than 75% Eastern Orthodox 50–75% non-religious Relative non-religious majority 30% Catholic, 30% non-religious (Germany)

In the spirit of Vatican II, the Catholic Church has embraced a more open approach to Christian unity to both Protestants and Eastern Orthodoxy. Nevertheless, many Americanised remnants of Anglo-American-style denominations of Protestantism remain deeply distrustful of the Catholic Church. Ecumenism with these sects appears unlikely.

In 2015, Pope Francis declared division among Christians as "the work of the father of lies [the devil]." Francis added that the devil knows that "all Christians are disciples of Christ: that they are one, that they are brothers! He [the devil] doesn't care if they are Evangelicals or Orthodox, Lutherans, Catholics or Apostolic… He doesn't care! They are Christians!"

In 2016, Pope Francis traveled to Lund, Sweden, where he took part in the celebration given for the upcoming of the 500th anniversary of the Reformation. The next year, the press of the Vatican released a stamp to commemorate the 500th anniversary of the Reformation; the stamp depicts Luther and Melanchton kneeling before a crucified Jesus.

== See also ==
- Christian ecumenism
  - Anglican–Roman Catholic dialogue
    - Personal ordinariate
  - Catholic–Eastern Orthodox relations
    - Joint Declaration of Pope Francis and Patriarch Kirill
  - Catholic–Lutheran dialogue
    - Joint Declaration on the Doctrine of Justification
    - Statement on the 500th anniversary of the Protestant Reformation
  - Pope Benedict XVI and ecumenism
  - Pope John Paul II and ecumenism
  - Pope Paul VI and ecumenism
- Christianity in the 16th century
  - Chronological list of saints and blesseds in the 16th century
- History of Christianity
  - History of Christian theology § Renaissance and Reformation
  - History of Oriental Orthodoxy
  - History of Protestantism
  - History of the Eastern Orthodox Church § Ottoman period
  - History of the Roman Catholic Church § Renaissance and reforms
- Timeline of Christianity
  - Timeline of Christian missions § 1500 to 1600
  - Timeline of Christianity § Reformation
  - Timeline of the English Reformation
  - Timeline of the Roman Catholic Church § 1454–1600
- Sunni-Shia relations
  - Anti-Shia sentiment and persecution
  - Sectarian violence among Muslims

== Bibliography ==
- Berntson, Martin (2006). "The Dissolution of the Hospitaller houses in Scandinavia". In Mol, Johannes A.; Militzer, Klaus; Nicholson, Helen J. (eds.). The Military Orders and the Reformation: Choices, State Building, and the. Hilversum Verloren. pp. 59–78.
- Congar, Yves. (2019) A History of Theology. ATF (Australia) Ltd.
- DePalma, Yves (2004). Dialogue on the Frontier: Catholic and Protestant Relations. Kent State University
- Dowley, Tim. (2018) A Short Introduction to the History of Christianity. Augsburg Fortress Publishers.
- Finn, Daniel. (2013) Christian Economic Ethics: History and Implications. Augsburg Fortress Publishers.
- Lockhart, Paul Douglas (2007). Denmark, 1513–1660: The Rise and Decline of a Renaissance Monarchy. Oxford University Press.
- Central Office of Church Statistics. (2019) "Presentation of the Pontifical Yearbook 2019 and the Annuarium Statisticum Ecclesiae 2017, 06.03.2019," Vatican Press. Retrieved 18 Feb 2020
- Pew Research Centre. (2011) "Global Christianity: A Report on the Size and Distribution of the World's Christian Population," Pew Research Centre. Retrieved 18 Feb 2020
