= Anglo-Catholicism (disambiguation) =

Anglo-Catholicism is the tendency within the Anglican Communion that emphasizes the church's Catholic heritage.

It may also refer to:

- the Catholic Church in England and Wales
- Roman Catholics who use Anglican-inspired liturgy, in particular former Anglicans; see Personal ordinariate and Pastoral Provision
- Anglican–Roman Catholic dialogue
- the Anglican Catholic Church, part of the continuing Anglican movement
