= Pope John Paul II and ecumenism =

Ecumenical activity during John Paul II's papacy

Pope John Paul II was publicly committed to improving relationships between Christian communities and engaged in numerous dialogues with leaders of other Christian churches.

== Eastern Orthodox Church ==
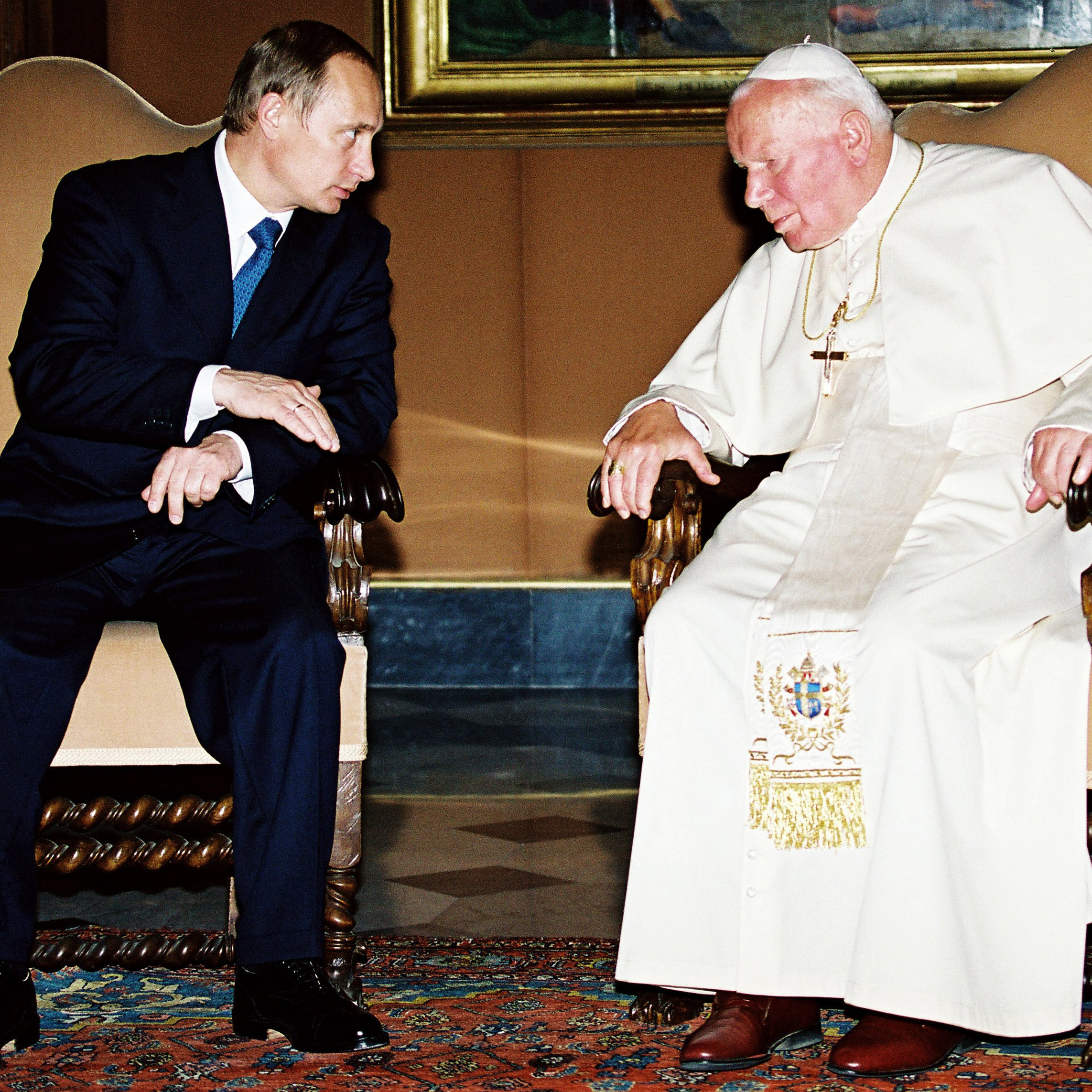
Pope John Paul II and Vladimir Putin in 2000

In May 1999, John Paul II visited Romania on the invitation from Patriarch Teoctist Arăpaşu of the Romanian Orthodox Church. This was the first time a pope had visited a predominantly Eastern Orthodox country since the Great Schism in 1054. On his arrival, the Patriarch and the President of Romania, Emil Constantinescu, greeted the pope. The Patriarch stated, "The second millennium of Christian history began with a painful wounding of the unity of the Church; the end of this millennium has seen a real commitment to restoring Christian unity."

On 23–27 June 2001, John Paul II visited Ukraine, another heavily Orthodox nation, at the invitation of the President of Ukraine and bishops of the Ukrainian Greek Catholic Church. The Pope spoke to leaders of the All-Ukrainian Council of Churches and Religious Organizations, pleading for "open, tolerant and honest dialogue". About 200 thousand people attended the liturgies celebrated by the Pope in Kyiv, and the liturgy in Lviv gathered nearly one and a half million faithful. John Paul II said that an end to the Great Schism was one of his fondest wishes. Healing divisions between the Catholic and Eastern Orthodox Churches regarding Latin and Byzantine traditions was clearly of great personal interest. For many years, John Paul II sought to facilitate dialogue and unity stating as early as 1988 in Euntes in mundum, "Europe has two lungs, it will never breathe easily until it uses both of them."

During his 2001 travels, John Paul II became the first pope to visit Greece in 1291 years. In Athens, the pope met with Archbishop Christodoulos of Athens, the head of the Church of Greece. After a private 30-minute meeting, the two spoke publicly. Christodoulos read a list of "13 offences" of the Catholic Church against the Eastern Orthodox Church since the Great Schism, including the sack of Constantinople by the Fourth Crusade in 1204, and bemoaned the lack of apology from the Catholic Church, saying "Until now, there has not been heard a single request for pardon" for the "maniacal crusaders of the 13th century".

The pope responded by saying "For the occasions past and present, when sons and daughters of the Catholic Church have sinned by action or omission against their Orthodox brothers and sisters, may the Lord grant us forgiveness", to which Christodoulos immediately applauded. John Paul II said that the sacking of Constantinople was a source of "profound regret" for Catholics. Later John Paul II and Christodoulos met on a spot where Paul of Tarsus had once preached to Athenian Christians. They issued a common declaration saying, "We shall do everything in our power, so that the Christian roots of Europe and its Christian soul may be preserved.... We condemn all recourse to violence, proselytism and fanaticism, in the name of religion." The two leaders then said the Lord's Prayer together, breaking an Orthodox taboo against praying with Catholics.

The pope had said throughout his pontificate that one of his greatest dreams was to visit Russia, but this never occurred. He attempted to solve the problems that had arisen over centuries between the Catholic and Russian Orthodox churches, and in 2004 gave them a 1730 copy of the lost icon of Our Lady of Kazan.

== Oriental Orthodox Church ==
=== Armenian Apostolic Church ===
John Paul II was determined to maintain good relations with the Armenian Apostolic Church, whose separation from the Holy See dated to Christian antiquity. In 1996, he brought the Catholic Church and the Armenian Apostolic Church closer by agreeing with Armenian Archbishop Karekin II on Christ's nature. During an audience in 2000, John Paul II and Karekin II, by then the Catholicos of All Armenians, issued a joint statement condemning the Armenian genocide. Meanwhile, the pope gave Karekin the relics of St. Gregory the Illuminator, the first head of the Armenian Church that had been kept in Naples, Italy, for 500 years. In September 2001, John Paul II went on a three-day pilgrimage to Armenia to take part in an ecumenical celebration with Karekin II in the newly consecrated Saint Gregory the Illuminator Cathedral, Yerevan. The two Church leaders signed a declaration remembering the victims of the Armenian genocide.

== Assyrian Church of the East ==
In 1994, Pope John Paul II and Mar Dinkha IV signed the Common Christological Declaration Between the Catholic Church and the Assyrian Church of the East.

== Protestantism ==
Like his successors after him, John Paul II took a large number of initiatives to promote friendly relations, practical humanitarian cooperation and theological dialogue with a range of Protestant bodies. Of these the first in importance had to be with Lutheranism, given that the contention with Martin Luther and his followers was the most significant historical split in Western Christianity.

=== Lutheranism ===
From 15 to 19 November 1980, John Paul II visited West Germany on his first trip to a country with a large Lutheran Protestant population. In Mainz, he met with leaders of the Protestant Church in Germany, and with representatives of other Christian denominations.

On 11 December 1983, John Paul II participated in an ecumenical service in the Evangelical Lutheran Church in Rome, the first papal visit ever to a Lutheran church. The visit took place 500 years after the birth of the German Martin Luther, who was first an Augustinian friar and subsequently a leading Protestant Reformer.

In his apostolic pilgrimage to Norway, Iceland, Finland, Denmark and Sweden of June 1989, John Paul II became the first pope to visit countries with Lutheran majorities. In addition to celebrating Mass with Catholic believers, he participated in ecumenical services at places that had been Catholic shrines before the Reformation: Nidaros Cathedral in Norway; near St. Olav's Church at Thingvellir in Iceland; Turku Cathedral in Finland; Roskilde Cathedral in Denmark; and Uppsala Cathedral in Sweden.

On 31 October 1999, (the 482nd anniversary of Reformation Day, Martin Luther's posting of the Ninety-five Theses), representatives of the Catholic Church's Pontifical Council for Promoting Christian Unity and the Lutheran World Federation signed a Joint Declaration on the Doctrine of Justification, as a gesture of unity. The signing was a fruit of a theological dialogue that had been going on between the Lutheran World Federation and the Holy See since 1965.

=== Anglicanism ===
John Paul II had good relations with the Church of England, as also with other parts of the Anglican Communion. He was the first reigning pope to travel to the United Kingdom, in 1982, where he met Queen Elizabeth II, the Supreme Governor of the Church of England. He preached in Canterbury Cathedral and received Robert Runcie, the Archbishop of Canterbury. He said that he was disappointed by the Church of England's decision to ordain women and saw it as a step away from unity between the Anglican Communion and the Catholic Church.

In 1980, John Paul II issued a Pastoral Provision allowing married former Episcopal priests to become Catholic priests, and for the acceptance of former Episcopal Church parishes into the Catholic Church. He allowed the creation of a form of the Roman Rite, known informally by some as the Anglican Use, which incorporates selected elements of the Anglican Book of Common Prayer that are compatible with Catholic doctrine. He permitted Archbishop Patrick Flores of San Antonio, Texas to establish Our Lady of the Atonement Catholic Church as the inaugural parish for the use of this hybrid liturgy.
