= Anglican–Roman Catholic International Commission =

Organisation promoting ecumenism between Anglican and Catholic churches

The Anglican–Roman Catholic International Commission (ARCIC) is an organization created in 1969 which seeks to make ecumenical progress between the Anglican–Roman Catholic dialogue. The sponsors are the Anglican Consultative Council and the Pontifical Council for Promoting Christian Unity (formerly the Secretariat for Promoting Christian Unity).

ARCIC seeks to identify common ground between the two communions. Ecumenical relations have become strained, owing to the ordination of women within the Anglican Communion and, in more recent years, the Anglican communion has internally become increasingly more divided over issues concerning homosexuality.

== Preliminary phase: 1967–68 ==
Three meetings were conducted by the Anglican–Roman Catholic Joint Preparatory Commission (ARCJPC) from 1967 to 1968. The first preparatory meeting was held in Italy, (Note: 9 January 1967 – 13 January 1967: "First Steps Toward Restoring Full Unity; identifying themes for dialogue", Villa Cagnola, Gazzada, Italy) a meeting on the place of scripture in England (Note: 30 August 1967 – 3 September 1967: "The Authority of the Word of God and its Relationship to the Church", Huntercombe Manor, Buckinghamshire, England) and culminating in a meeting in Malta (Note: 31 December 1967 – 3 January 1968: "A Vision for Unity" The Malta Report, Mount St. Joseph, Malta) culminating in the Malta Report.

== First phase: 1970–1981 ==
The first phase was conducted by the Anglican–Roman Catholic International Commission (ARCIC) from 1970 to 1982.

The first phase of ARCIC was held under the aegis of Henry McAdoo (Anglican Archbishop of Dublin) and Alan Clark (Roman Catholic Bishop of East Anglia). The co-secretaries were Anglicans Colin Davey and Christopher Hill and the Roman Catholic William A. Purdy. (Note: Davey was co-secretary until July 1974 and Hill was co-secretary from August 1974.)

In 1970 and 1971, there were a number of meetings on eucharistic doctrine, (Note: 9 January 1970 – 15 January 1970: "Fundamentals of the Faith; Authority; Church; Intercommunion and Ministry; Eucharist", Windsor, England) (Note: 21 September 1970 – 28 September 1970: "Church and Ministry; Church and Authority; Church and Eucharist; the Relation of Men and Women; Making of Moral Judgements", Venice, Italy) (Note: 1 September 1971 – 8 September 1971: "Eucharistic Doctrine" - produced an agreed statement (Windsor Report on Eucharistic Doctrine), Windsor, England) producing an agreed statement. (Note: An agreed statement is published by the commission and neither an official statement of the Catholic Church nor an official statement of the Anglican Communion.) An elucidation was issued in 1979.

In 1972, there was a meeting on the subject of ordination. (Note: 30 August 1972 – 7 September 1972: "Ministry and Ordination", Gazzada, Italy) It paved the way for an agreed statement from Canterbury. (Note: 28 August 1973 – 6 September 1973: "Ministry and Ordination" - produced an agreed statement, Canterbury, England) An elucidation was issued in 1979.

In the mid-1970s, a number of meetings were held on the issue of authority (Note: 27 August 1974 – 5 September 1974: "Authority", Grottaferrata, Italy) (Note: 27 August 1975 – 5 September 1975: "Authority in the Church, Primacy, Infallibility", Oxford, England) culminating in a statement made at Venice. (Note: 24 August 1976 – 2 September 1976: "Authority in the Church I" - produced an agreed statement, Venice, Italy) Further discussions on the subject of authority were held in 1977, (Note: 30 August 1977 – 8 September 1977: "How to treat the reaction to the Statement", Chichester, England) 1979, (Note: 28 August 1979 – 6 September 1979: further discussion of "Authority" statement, Venice, Italy) and 1980; (Note: 26 August 1980 – 4 September 1980: Authority and universal jurisdiction, Venice, Italy) with elucidations and a further statement issued in 1981 with the final statement. (Note: 25 August 1981 – 3 September 1981: published elucidations of the two produced agreed statements after public criticism of both documents, ARCIC I Final Report, Windsor, England)

A final statement for "ARCIC I" was issued in 1981. There were responses from both the Lambeth Conference and the Catholic Church. Further clarifications on the Eucharist and Ministry were issued in 1993.

== Second phase: 1983–2011 ==
The second phase was conducted by the Second Anglican–Roman Catholic International Commission (ARCIC II) from 1983 to 2006. The second phase co-chairs were the Anglican bishops Mark Santer, (Note: Bishop of Birmingham, England (1982–1999)) Frank Griswold, (Note: Presiding Bishop and Primate of the Episcopal Church in the United States of America (1999–2003)) and Peter Carnley; (Note: Archbishop of Perth and Anglican Primate of Australia (2003–)) and the Roman Catholic bishops Cormac Murphy-O'Connor, (Note: Bishop of Arundel and Brighton, England (1982–1999)) and Alexander Joseph Brunett. (Note: Archbishop of Seattle, USA (1999–)) A number of Anglican (Note: Christopher Hill 1967–1990; Stephen Platten 1990–1994; Donald Anderson 1994–1996; David Hamid 1996–2002; Gregory Cameron 2003–) and Roman Catholic (Note: Richard L. Stewart 1983–1985; Kevin McDonald 1985–1993; Timothy Galligan 1993–2001; Donald Bolen 2001–) clerics served as co-secretaries.

The topics covered by ARCIC II included the doctrine of salvation, (Note: 30 August 1983 – 6 September 1983: "The Church, Grace and Salvation", Venice, Italy) (Note: 22 August 1984 – 31 August 1984: "The Church, Salvation and the Doctrine of Justification", Durham, England) (Note: 26 August 1985 – 4 September 1985: "Salvation and the Church", Graymoor, New York) (Note: 26 August 1986 – 4 September 1986: "Salvation and the Church" – produced an agreed statement, Llandaff, Wales) communion, (Note: 1 September 1987 – 10 September 1987: "Growth in Communion", Palazzola, Rocca di Papa, Italy) (Note: 24 August 1988 – 2 September 1988: "Communion: Commonalities and Differences", Edinburgh, Scotland) (Note: 28 August 1989 – 6 September 1989: "The Theology of Communion; Moral Issues", Venice, Italy) (Note: 28 August 1990 – 6 September 1990: "Church as Communion" – produced an agreed statement, Dublin, Ireland) (Note: 27 August 1991 – 5 September 1991: "Morals and Ecclesial Communion", Paris, France) (Note: 28 August 1992 – 6 September 1992: "Common Witness to Moral Values; Morals, Communion and the Church", Windsor, England) (Note: 28 August 1993 – 6 September 1993: "Life in Christ, Morals, Communion and the Church" - produced an agreed statement, Venice, Italy) teaching authority, (Note: 31 August 1994 – 9 September 1994: "Authority in the Church", Jerusalem) (Note: 28 August 1995 – 6 September 1995: "Teaching Authority in the Church and its Relation to Scripture and Tradition", Venice, Italy) (Note: 26 August 1996 – 4 September 1996: "Scripture, Tradition and the Exercise of Authority", Mechelen, Belgium) (Note: 26 August 1997 – 4 September 1997: "Scripture, Tradition and the Gift of Authority in the Church", Alexandria, Virginia) (Note: 25 August 1998 – 3 September 1998: "The Gift of Authority: Authority in the Church III" - produced an agreed statement, Palazzola, Rocca di Papa, Italy) and the role of Mary the mother of God. (Note: 26 August 1999 – 2 September 1999: "Review of Reactions to The Gift of Authority. Preliminary Discussion of Marian Issues", Mississauga, Ontario, Canada) (Note: 26 August 2000 – 4 September 2000: "Marian issues", Paris, France) (Note: 27 August 2001 – 4 September 2001: "Marian Issues", Dublin, Ireland) (Note: 10 July 2002 – 18 July 2002: "The Place of the Blessed Virgin Mary in the Life and Doctrine of the Church", Vienna, Austria) (Note: 10 July 2003 – 18 July 2003: "Marian Issues", West Palm Beach, Florida) (Note: 28 January 2004 – 3 February 2004: "Marian Issues and Final Document"; "Mary: Grace and Hope in Christ" - produced an agreed statement, Seattle, Washington)

In 2000, ARCIC II supported a meeting of 13 pairs of Anglican and Roman Catholic bishops from around the globe at Mississauga, Ontario, Canada. This meeting set up the International Anglican—Roman Catholic Commission on Unity and Mission (IARCCUM), which began to meet in 2002, but was suspended from 2003–2005 in view of the consecration of an openly gay Anglican bishop in the USA. IARCCUM is not about reaching theological agreement so much as finding ways to put into practice the agreements which ARCIC has reached and have been accepted by the two Churches.

In 2007, IARCCUM issued Growing Together in Unity and Mission which was the summary of the nine Agreed Statements of ARCIC. This states that "The Roman Catholic Church teaches that the ministry of the Bishop of Rome [the Pope] as universal primate is in accordance with Christ's will for the Church and an essential element of maintaining it in unity and truth." Not only that but the document goes on to say that "We urge Anglicans and Roman Catholics to explore together how the ministry of the Bishop of Rome might be offered and received in order to assist our Communions to grow towards full, ecclesial communion."

== Third phase: 2011–present ==
The third phase was conducted by the Anglican–Roman Catholic International Commission III (ARCIC-III) from 2011 to the present.

The third phase started from 17–27 May 2011, at the ecumenical Bose Monastic Community in northern Italy. (Note: 17 May 2011 – 27 May 2011: on the theme "Church as Communion — local and universal.", Bose, Italy) The third phase of ARCIC will be to consider fundamental questions regarding the Church as Communion – Local and Universal, and How in Communion the Local and Universal Church Comes to Discern Right Ethical Teaching. The opening meeting also noted Roman Catholic—Anglican tensions over the creation of the Personal Ordinariate of Our Lady of Walsingham, directly subject to the Holy See, earlier the same year in order to make easier the transition by Anglican congregations (not just individuals) wishing to move into communion with the Catholic Church. The third phase has held several meetings. (Note: 3 May 2012 – 10 May 2012: Kowloon, Hong Kong) (Note: 29 April 2013 – 7 May 2013: Rio de Janeiro, Brazil) (Note: 12 May 2014 – 20 May 2014: Botha's Hill, South Africa) (Note: 28 April 2015 – 4 May 2015: produced two draft documents, Palazolla, Italy)

The co-chairmen of this phase:

- Most Rev Bernard Longley, Archbishop of Birmingham (Roman Catholic)
- Most Rev Sir David Moxon, former Archbishop of New Zealand (Anglican)

Roman Catholic members:

- Most Rev Arthur Kennedy, Auxiliary Bishop Emeritus of Boston
- Most Rev Robert Christian, OP, Auxiliary Bishop of San Francisco
- Very Rev Henry Wansbrough, OSB, professor at Liverpool Hope University
- Rev Vimal Tirimanna, CSsR, professor at the Alphonsianum University
- Rev Adelbert Denaux, professor emeritus at Catholic University of Leuven
- Sr Teresa Okure, SHCJ, scholar-in-residence at Catholic Institute of West Africa
- Dr Paul Murray, professor at Durham University
- Dr Janet Smith, professor at Sacred Heart Major Seminary

Anglican members:

- The Rt Rev Dr Christopher Hill, president of the Conference of European Churches
- The Rt Rev Nkosinathi Ndwandwe, Suffragan Bishop of Natal
- The Rt Rev Linda Nicholls, Bishop of Huron
- The Rev Dr Stewart Clem, professor at Aquinas Institute of Theology
- The Rev Canon Dr Mark McIntosh, professor at Loyola University Chicago
- The Rev Canon Dr Michael Poon, professor at Trinity Theological College, Singapore
- The Rev Canon Dr Nicholas Sagovsky, canon theologian at Westminster Abbey
- The Rev Canon Dr Peter Sedgwick, former principal of St. Michael's College
- Dr Paula Gooder, canon chancellor of St Paul's Cathedral

== Controversy ==
ARCIC has met with some hostile reaction from Traditionalist Catholics. Although ARCIC had just completed the major document on Marian theology in 2003, Pope John Paul II suspended official talks between the Catholic Church and the Anglican Communion, owing to the consecration of Gene Robinson, a homosexual man in a non-celibate relationship, as a bishop in the Episcopal Church in the United States.

Moreover, the ordination of women, especially to the episcopacy, has repeatedly been questioned by the Catholic Church leadership as harmful to Christian unity. Walter Kasper, President of the Pontifical Council for Promoting Christian Unity, put it this way: The ordination of women to the episcopate "signified a breaking away from apostolic tradition and a further obstacle for reconciliation between the Catholic Church and the Church of England." He also seemed more upset about the warring parties within Anglicanism: "He described the legislation for those opposed to women's ordained ministry in the Church of England as the 'unspoken institutionalism' of an 'existing schism.'"

At the opening of the May 2011 meeting, British journalist William Oddie claimed that ARCIC activities were useless, as only the Roman Catholic side had a clear agenda and described all ecumenical activity as leading to a dead end. The ARCIC III Co Chairmen replied saying each communion was formally committed to continuing this sacred task at the highest level. They referred to substantial common ground while acknowledging the existence of significant obstacles, but said they trusted in the power of the Holy Spirit to draw the two communions closer.

== See also ==
- Pope Benedict XVI and Ecumenism
- International Anglican–Roman Catholic Commission for Unity and Mission
