= Sacerdotalis caelibatus =

1967 papal encyclical

Sacerdotalis caelibatus Latin for 'Of the celibate priesthood' Encyclical of Pope Paul VI
- Signature date: 24 June 1967
- Subject: About the celibacy of the priesthood
- Number: 6 of 7 of the pontificate
- Text: In Latin; In English

Sacerdotalis caelibatus (Latin for "Of priestly celibacy") is an encyclical written by Pope Paul VI. Acknowledging the traditions given by the Holy Spirit to the Church in the East and acknowledging some few pastoral exceptions in the West, the encyclical explains and defends the Catholic Church's tradition of clerical celibacy in the West. The encyclical is dated 24 June 1967.

== Summary of the encyclical ==
This encyclical was written in the wake of the Second Vatican Council, when the Catholic Church was examining and revising many long-held practices. Priestly celibacy is a discipline, a practice, rather than required dogma, and many at the time had expected that it might be relaxed together with some other practices.

In response to these questions, the pope reaffirms the teaching as a principled, long-held practice with special importance in the Catholic Church.

=== Discussion of arguments against priestly celibacy ===
Paul VI begins the encyclical by considering arguments against celibacy for the priesthood. Among these, he lists:

- Those who feel called to both the priesthood and married life.
- The perceived shortage of priests, and whether lifting the celibacy requirement might alleviate that.
- The argument that celibacy is contrary to healthy psychological development.
- Whether an acceptance of celibacy by a young priest might become much more difficult with greater maturity.

=== Confirmation of the law of celibacy ===
In response to these, Paul VI brings as witness the value of celibacy testified by many religious in the Church throughout the world, in many times and locations. Paul goes on to reaffirm the law of celibacy as something that should be continued: "Hence We consider that the present law of celibacy should today continue to be linked to the ecclesiastical ministry."

Paul VI agrees that the priestly life and the celibate life are distinguishable, but he affirms the authority of the Church's magisterium to determine the conditions under which the priesthood may be granted to its members:

the priestly vocation, although inspired by God, does not become definitive or operative without having been tested and accepted by those in the Church who hold power and bear responsibility for the ministry serving the ecclesial community. It is, therefore, the task of those who hold authority in the Church to determine, in accordance with the varying conditions of time and place, who in actual practice are to be considered suitable candidates for the religious and pastoral service of the Church, and what should be required of them.

=== Reasons for celibacy ===
Much of the encyclical is spent discussing reasons why Paul VI believes that celibacy in the priesthood is of value for the Church. Among these, he lists:

- The model of Christ's own celibacy. As the exemplar priest, Christ's example is quite significant, and suggests a model that ought to be followed by later priests who act in his stead, and who wish to imitate his condition of life.
- While marriage is to be respected as a means to holiness, Scripture testifies that celibacy is a superior means.
- Celibacy as a means to love God's people without being tied down. A priest's life ought to be free so that he may better devote himself to bringing forth children of God in other ways.
- Christ's own description of Heaven as a place without marriage implies that practicing celibacy now is a means to prepare for the celibate life that all share in Heaven.

=== Survey of celibacy in Christian tradition ===
==== History of celibacy ====
The Pope then very briefly outlines the history of celibacy in the Church, tracing its support in the West to the 4th century. He also recalls its confirmation in later Church councils.

==== Comparison with the Eastern Church ====
Paul VI notes that although non-celibates may be ordained as priests in the Eastern Church, they only ordain as bishops priests who are celibates. He also mentions that in the East, once ordained as priests, men are no longer allowed to marry.

=== Special exceptions ===
While affirming the importance of celibacy as a general law in the Catholic Church, the Pope nevertheless allows that married persons who enter the Church from other traditions may in some cases be ordained as priests. He emphasizes, however, that this must not be understood as a relaxation of the law, nor as a first step to its abolition.

Paul VI also expresses doubt that relaxing the law of celibacy would help increase vocations to the Catholic priesthood, by noting that it has not done so in other Christian traditions.

=== Defense of celibacy ===
The Pope devotes much text to defending the practice of celibacy against the argument that it is contrary to human nature.

==== The aid of grace ====
Above all, Paul states that the human person is more than simply flesh, and that any true call to a life devoted to God that includes celibacy will also be aided by God's own grace to sustain it:

The true, profound reason for dedicated celibacy is, as We have said, the choice of a closer and more complete relationship with the mystery of Christ and the Church for the good of all mankind: in this choice there is no doubt that those highest human values are able to find their fullest expression.

The Pope also cautions that a priest's celibacy should never attempt to be based on a complete ignorance or avoidance of human sexuality, an ignorance that he agrees would indeed be counter to true human nature. Rather, it should be based on a free choice based on true knowledge and understanding.

==== Celibacy as a viable alternative to marriage ====
Although the Pope upholds the sanctity of the sacrament of marriage, he rejects the notion that it is the only reasonable path available to a person. Rather, the love that feeds a priest's choice of celibate life also draws on God:

His charity is drawn from the purest source, practiced in the imitation of God and Christ, and is no less demanding and real than any other genuine love. It gives the priest a limitless horizon, deepens and gives breadth to his sense of responsibility – a mark of mature personality – and inculcates in him, as a sign of a higher and greater fatherhood, a generosity and refinement of heart which offer a superlative enrichment.

==== Celibacy as a means to greater union with God ====
By freeing himself from other obligations, Paul teaches that a priest is thereby freer to devote himself to God. He also says that the increased solitude away from the demands of wife and family may nourish a priest's spiritual life.

=== Considerations for priestly formation ===
Paul VI understands that celibacy is a difficult requirement for many, and encourages increased care to help those discerning priestly vocation to make sure that they are truly called to it: "Let educators appreciate that this is one of their very grave duties." Paul also points out that support by others for a priest's celibate life must continue even after ordination.

Paul VI emphasizes that celibacy is a serious choice, and that it must not be entered into without accompanying ascetic practices for the rest of the priest's life.

Paul VI also says that before being undertaken with a solemn vow, a candidate for the priesthood ought to undergo temporary vows of celibacy before solemnly taking a permanent vow.

=== Dispensations from the priesthood ===
The Pope then turns to consider those who have decided to leave the life of priestly celibacy. He allows that inquiry may be taken concerning those who claim that their vows were taken under freedom and responsibility to see if they may be relieved of their vow. However, Paul sternly warns,

If these priests knew how much sorrow, dishonor and unrest they bring to the holy Church of God, if they reflected on the seriousness and beauty of their obligations and on the dangers to which they are exposed in this life and in the next, there would be greater care and reflection in their decisions; they would pray more assiduously and show greater courage and logic in forestalling the causes of their spiritual and moral collapse.

=== Appeal to the laity ===
Paul VI concludes the encyclical by appealing to the laity to pray for vocations to the priesthood and encourages their friendship with priests as a means of supporting them in their life.

== See also ==
- Theology of the Body
- Pastoral Provision
