= Paul van K. Thomson =

The Reverend Paul van Kuykendall Thomson (December 14, 1916 – December 22, 1999) was an American Anglo-Catholic then Roman Catholic priest, author and educator.

Born in Weehawken, New Jersey to Walter Scott Thomson and Mary van Kuykendall Thomson, he graduated from Weehawken High School and attended Columbia University, where he graduated in English as a classmate of Thomas Merton. He next attended Berkeley Divinity School in New Haven, Connecticut (1937-1940).

He was ordained to the Episcopal priesthood in 1940, and volunteered to serve as a naval chaplain during the Second World War. He received two Combat Stars and a Presidential Unit Citation.

Thomson served parishes in New Jersey before becoming rector of St. Stephen's Church (Providence, Rhode Island). In 1949, he and his family became Roman Catholics. In the same year, Thomson became a professor at Providence College. He next received an M.A. and doctorate from Brown University. Thomson served as a full professor and administrator at Providence College from 1959, overseeing the implementation of coeducation at the school.

In 1983, Thomson became the sixth married former Episcopal priest in the United States to be ordained to the Roman Catholic priesthood under the Pastoral Provision; he was the first such priest in the Diocese of Providence.

Thomson retired from teaching at Providence College in 1985.

== See also ==
- Pastoral Provision
- Anglican Use
- Clerical celibacy in the Catholic Church

== Bibliography ==
- Byron's Use of Religious Materials (1952)
- Why I Am a Catholic (1959)
- Francis Thompson: A Critical Biography (1961)
- Plus Sign on the Roof (1990), autobiography ISBN 9780932506863
