= S. Stephen's Church (Providence, Rhode Island) =

Historic church in Rhode Island, United States

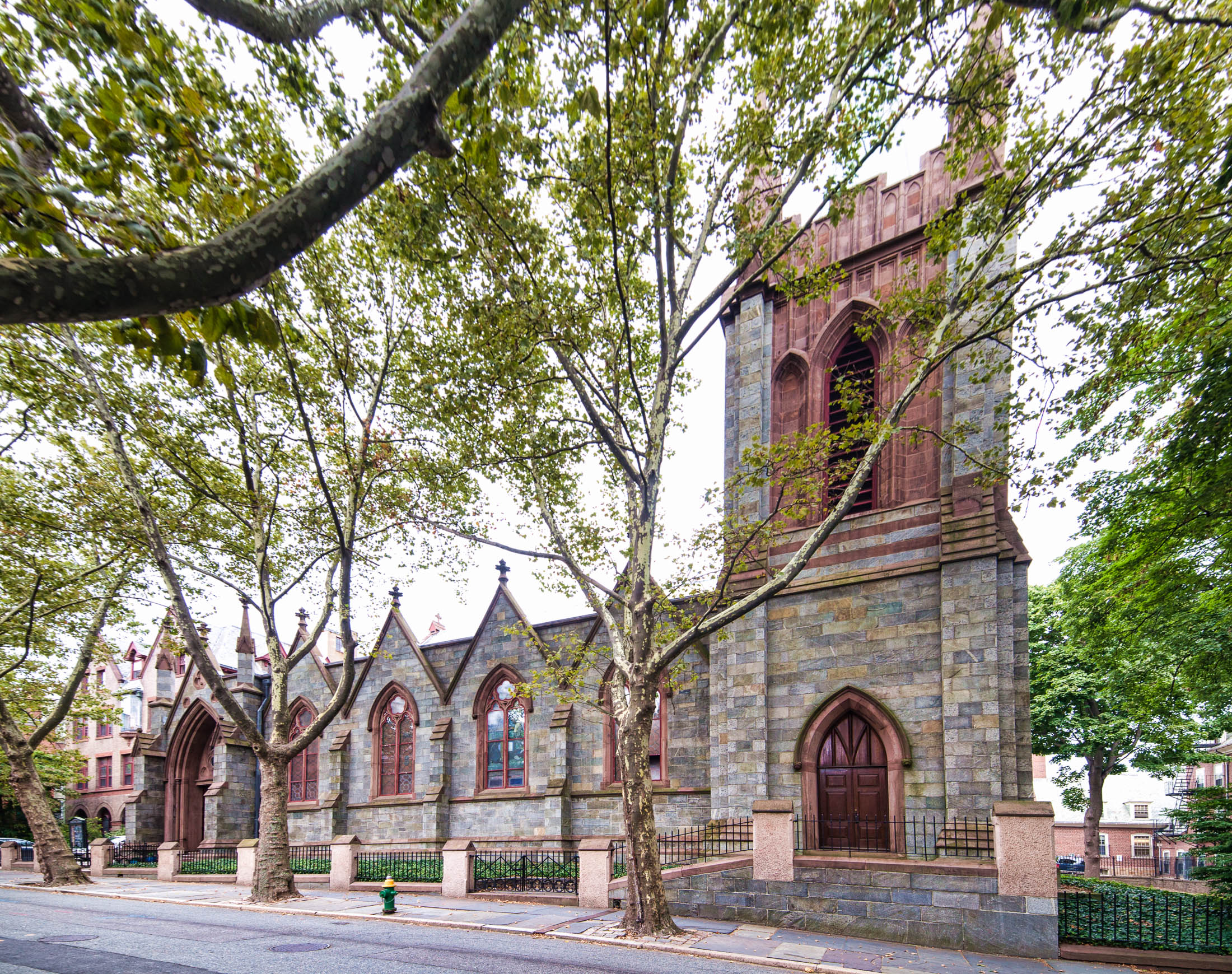
- S. Stephen's Church
- 41°49′32.4294″N 71°24′4.3698″W
- Location: 114 George St., Providence, Rhode Island
- S. Stephen's Church
- U.S. National Register of Historic Places
- U.S. National Historic Landmark District – Contributing property
- Location within Rhode Island Location within the United States
- Built: 1860
- Architects: Richard Upjohn; Multiple
- Architectural style: Gothic
- Part of: College Hill Historic District (ID70000019)
- NRHP reference No.: 73000001

Significant dates
- Added to NRHP: February 6, 1973
- Designated NHLDCP: November 10, 1970

S. Stephen's Church is an historic Episcopal Anglo-Catholic church located at 114 George Street in the College Hill neighborhood of Providence, Rhode Island. It is in the Brown University campus and is an active parish in the Episcopal Diocese of Rhode Island. Organized in 1839, it is the third-oldest Episcopal parish in Providence. The church reported 130 members in 2015 and 109 members in 2023; no membership statistics were reported in 2024 parochial reports. Plate and pledge income reported for the congregation in 2024 was $211,371. Average Sunday attendance (ASA) in 2024 was 87 persons. This was a relative decrease on ASA of 102 reported in 2018.

== Parish History ==
S. Stephen's Church was first organized January 31, 1839, and was admitted to the diocesan convention in July of the same year. The next year, the first permanent structure for the parish was erected at the northwest corner of Transit St. and Benefit St.

S. Stephen's traces its high church roots back to the yearlong tenure of the Reverend George Leeds, who instituted the first beginnings of Anglo-Catholic tradition at S. Stephen's (three years before the founding of the Church of the Advent, the most significant tractarian church in the region. Such leanings were publicly condemned by the Bishop of Rhode Island, and Leeds departed soon after.

The Rev. Henry Waterman, himself a graduate of Brown University, was also of the tractarian tradition, as was his successor, the Rev. James Eames. In 1850, Waterman returned for a second term as rector, with the vestry looking to expand to a new location. During the first years of Waterman's second tenure, the African-American parish of Christ Church, Providence, was forced to disband, and the communicants were transferred to S. Stephen's, marking one of the earliest instances of parochial integrations in America.

Following the confirmation and election to the vestry of several members of Providence's elite families, such as Robert Ives Jr. and Robert Goddard, the parish purchased the lot which it occupies today. The lot, purchased in January of 1860 for $12,093.12 (just under $500,000 in 2025 USD), was only a few hundred feet from Brown University. Funding for the new building came from a variety of sources, ranging from notable Providence financier John Carter Brown to a large number of middle-class and lower-class parishioners.

On Saint Matthew’s Day, September 21, 1860, the cornerstone of the new building was laid, though its location has since been lost. The church was consecrated February 27, 1862.

== The Church Building ==
The church building, a large stone Gothic Revival structure, was designed by Richard Upjohn and built in 1860–62. In 1889 the congregation received a major bequest from Henry J. Steere, a prominent philanthropist.

S. Stephen's represents an early example of the American Gothic Revival, and exhibits many traditional traits of the movement, such as the solid columns, window tracery, high side aisles, wide nave, and the building's overall proportions. The church is asymmetrical, with a second aisle on the south side of the building serving as a Lady chapel.

The church building was listed on the U.S. National Register of Historic Places in 1973.

== Rectors ==
1. Francis Vinton, 1839–1840
2. George Leeds, 1840–1841
3. Henry Waterman, 1841–1845
4. James H. Eames, 1845–1850
5. Henry Waterman, 1850–1874
6. Charles W. Ward, 1875–1877
7. James W. Colwell, 1878–1884
8. George McClellan Fiske, 1884–1919
9. Frederick Spies Penfold, 1919–1926
10. Frederic Fleming, 1927–1930
11. Charles Townsend, Jr., 1930–1945
12. Paul van K. Thomson, 1946–1949
13. Warren R. Ward, 1949–1965
14. Paul C. Kintzing, 1965–1976
15. Livingston T. Merchant, 1977–1980
16. Ronald P. Conner, 1981–1989
17. David L. Stokes, Jr., 1991–1999
18. John D. Alexander, 2000–2019
19. Benjamin P. Straley (2021-2025)
20. Veronica Tierney (Priest in Charge 2025-)

== See also ==
- National Register of Historic Places listings in Providence, Rhode Island
