= Catholic–Lutheran dialogue =

Extensive series of discussions which began in 1964

The Catholic–Lutheran dialogue is a series of discussions that began during July 1964 as an outgrowth of the Second Vatican Council. These gatherings reflect the new openness of the Catholic Church to dialogue with other Christian denominations as well as other religions. These dialogues have been primarily between representatives of the Lutheran World Federation and representatives of the Pontifical Council for Promoting Christian Unity.

The Catholic–Lutheran dialogue within the United States have been conducted under the auspices of the U.S. Bishops' Committee for Ecumenical and Interreligious Affairs and the USA National Committee of the Lutheran World Federation. The Catholic–Lutheran dialogue brought the Evangelical Lutheran Church in America and the Lutheran Church–Missouri Synod (LCMS) together to dialogue with the American Catholic community. The LCMS has not participated in all discussions. Unlike the Evangelical Lutheran Church in America, the LCMS has not come to an agreement with the Catholic Church due to differences in the understanding of various issues including faith, grace, and sin.

After the Second Vatican Council, the Catholic–Lutheran dialogue culminated in the Joint Declaration on the Doctrine of Justification (1999) and the Statement on the 500th anniversary of the Protestant Reformation (2016), which essentially resolved the core theological conflict of Martin Luther and subsequent adversaries. This conflict was further eased by the Anglican Communion doing the same.

== Rounds of discussion ==
Starting in July 1964, over 50 sessions have been held taking up eleven rounds of topics as of 2015:

- I. The Status of the Nicene Creed as Dogma of the Church (1965)
- II. One Baptism for the Remission of Sins (1966)
- III. The Eucharist as Sacrifice (1968)
- IV. Eucharist and Ministry (1970)
- V. Papal Primacy and the Universal Church (1973)
- VI. Teaching Authority & Infallibility in the Church (1978)
- VII. Justification by Faith (1983)
- VIII. The One Mediator, the Saints, and Mary (1990)
- IX. Scripture and Tradition (1995)
- X. The Church as Koinonia of Salvation: Its Structures and Ministries (2004)
- XI. The Hope for Eternal Life (2010)
- XII. Ministries of Teaching (2011)

== Subsequent events ==
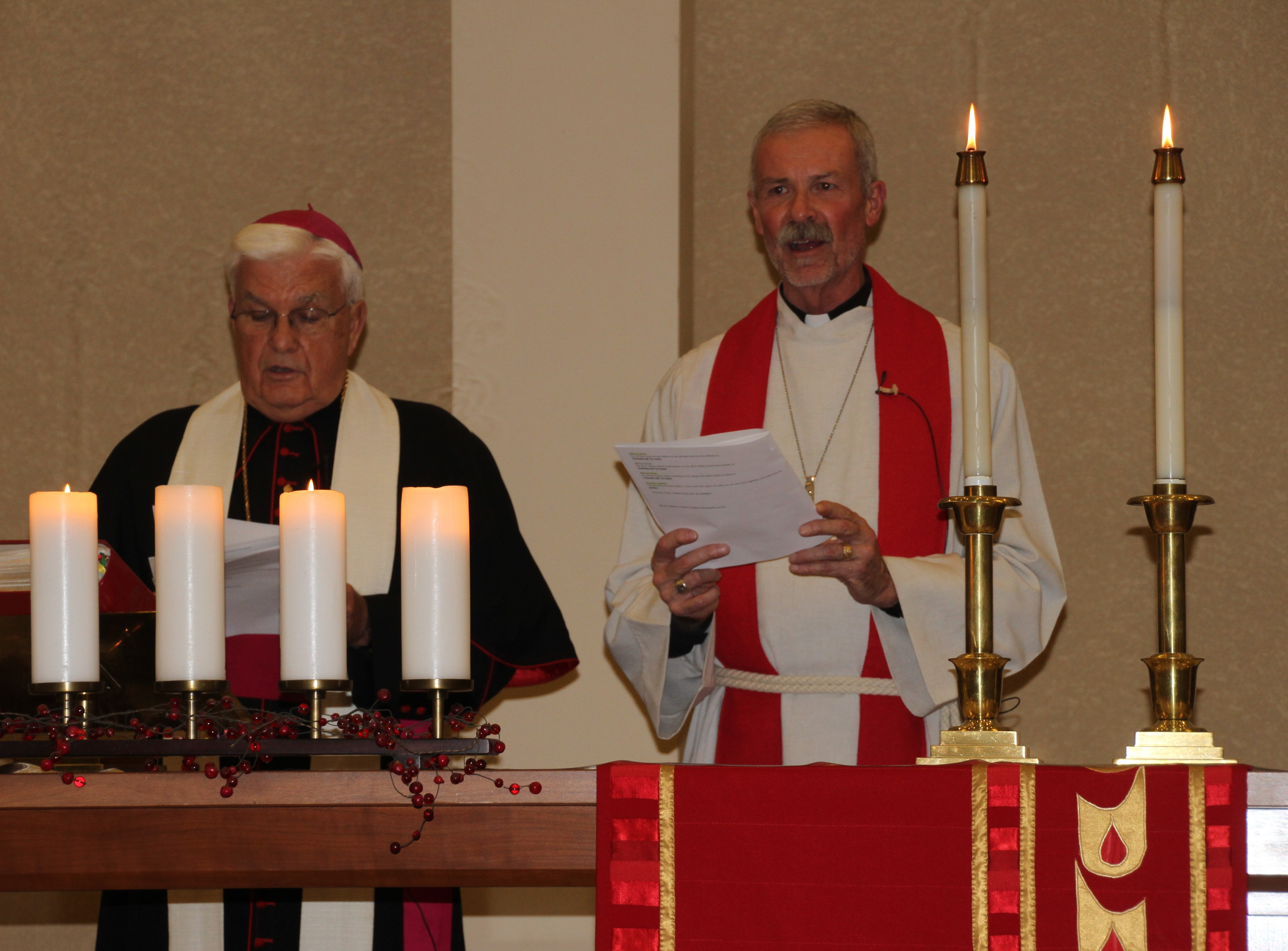
Bishop of the Roman Catholic Diocese of Winona and the ELCA bishop of Southeast Minnesota leading a common commemoration in 2017 of the Protestant Reformation

Significant events following these dialogues included a joint statement on the doctrine of Justification by Faith issued in 1983 and the Joint Declaration on the Doctrine of Justification issued on 31 October 1999. In 2010, the Catholic–Lutheran dialogue completed a common statement entitled The Hope of Eternal Life. In 2015, Lutherans and Roman Catholics jointly issued the Declaration on the Way: Church, Ministry and Eucharist, an ecumenical document marking greater visible unity between Catholics and Lutherans.

The Lutheran World Federation and the Pontifical Council for Promoting Christian Unity hosted a joint Ecumenical Commemoration event at Lund Cathedral in Lund, Sweden, on 31 October 2016. This was a shared Catholic–Lutheran commemoration of the 499th anniversary of the posting by Martin Luther of the Ninety-five Theses at All Saint's Church in Wittenberg, Germany, in 1517.

Archbishop Flavio Pace, Secretary of the Dicastery for Promoting Christian Unity proclaimed in January 2026 that a commemoration of the Augsburg Confession will be scheduled for 2030; he emphasized that "It is important to commemorate that text in order to rediscover a common basis" between the Catholic Church and the Lutheran Churches.

== Documents ==
Catholic–Lutheran Joint Commission

- "First Official Report of the Joint Working Group" (1966)
- "The Gospel and the Church" (1972)
- The Eucharist (1978)
- "Statement on the Augsburg Confession" (1980)
- "Ways to Community" (1980)
- "The Ministry in the Church" (1981)
- "Martin Luther - Witness to Jesus Christ" (1983)
- "Facing Unity. Models, Forms and Phases of Catholic-Lutheran Church Fellowship" (1984)
- "Church and Justification" (1994)

Catholic–Lutheran dialogue in the USA

- The Status of the Nicene Creed as Dogma of the Church (7 July 1965)
- One Baptism for the Remission of Sins (13 February 1966)
- The Eucharist (1 October 1967)
- Eucharist and Ministry (1970)
- Differing Attitudes Toward Papal Primacy (1973)
- Teaching Authority and Infallibility in the Church (1978)
- Justification by Faith (1983)
- The One Mediator, the Saints, and Mary (1990)
- Scripture and Tradition (1995)
- The Church as Koinonia of Salvation: Its Structures and Ministries (2004)
- The Hope of Eternal Life (1 November 2010)

Ecumenical Working Group of Catholic and Lutheran theologians in Germany

- "The Condemnations of the Reformation Era - Do They Still Divide?" (1986)

Catholic–Lutheran Commission on Unity

- From Conflict to Communion: Catholic–Lutheran Common Commemoration of the Reformation in 2017 (2013)

Joint Declarations

- Joint Declaration on the Doctrine of Justification (1999)

== Eucharistic sharing between Catholics and Lutherans ==
Susan Wood, a Sister of Charity, who is a systematic theology professor and chair of the theology department at Marquette University and a former president of the Catholic Theological Society of America, stated that "Since Vatican II, we have acknowledged an imperfect communion between Lutheran and Catholics" and that "there is no substantial difference in Lutheran and Catholic belief in the real presence of Christ in the Eucharist". Wood stated that in the near future intercommunion could happen in places "where people can't get out, like nursing homes and prisons".

On 15 November 2015, while at Christuskirche in Rome Pope Francis answered a Lutheran woman wishing to be able to participate in Holy Communion with her Catholic husband: "It is a question that each person must answer for themselves … there is one baptism, one faith, one Lord, so talk to the Lord and move forward". In the following year at Lund Cathedral, in a joint Lutheran-Catholic service commemorating the Reformation, Pope Francis and Bishop Munib Younan (the head of the Lutheran World Federation) "jointly pledged to remove the obstacles to full unity between their Churches, leading eventually to shared Eucharist".

Recognizing that "that everyone in a marriage that binds denominations", the Catholic Church in Germany in 2018 produced a pastoral handout allowing Lutheran spouses of Catholics to receive Communion from Catholic ministers in certain cases, "provided they 'affirm the Catholic faith in the Eucharist'". Thus far, Archbishop Hans-Josef Becker (Roman Catholic Archdiocese of Paderborn), Archbishop Stefan Heße (Roman Catholic Archdiocese of Hamburg), Archbishop Ludwig Schick (Roman Catholic Diocese of Fulda), and Bishop Franz Jung (Roman Catholic Diocese of Würzburg) have implemented the pastoral document, in addition to Bishops Gerhard Feige of Magdeburg and Franz-Josef Bode of Osnabrück declaring their intention to implement the pastoral document well. Bishop Franz Jung, while celebrating a Jubilee Mass on 5 July 2018 at Würzburg Cathedral, called inter-denominational marriages "denomination-uniting" and thus "especially invited" couples in which one spouse is Protestant to receive the Eucharist during his sermon.

== Personal ordinariates ==
Given the liturgical and theological closeness of Lutheranism with Roman Catholicism, certain Roman Catholic theologians have proposed a structure similar to the personal ordinariates for Anglican congregations and denominations that entered the Roman Catholic Church through the same. Both Cardinal Kurt Koch, president of the Pontifical Council for Christian Unity of the Catholic Church, and Cardinal Gerhard Ludwig Müller, prefect of the Congregation for the Doctrine of the Faith, proposed the "creation of an ordinariate for Lutherans where the legitimate traditions they have developed may be respected." Cardinal Müller noted that after the Second Vatican Council, many Lutherans "believe that many of the reforms that Luther had sought were actually implemented by the Second Vatican Council." Additionally, Cardinal Müller noted that the Lutheran faith preserved much of Roman Catholic tradition. The Lutheran World Federation expressed "great concern" at the proposal of the creation of these structures, noting that personal ordinariates for former Lutherans would "add additional challenges to creating an understanding on the issues of ecclesiology, which are part of ongoing ecumenical dialogues" and that "it would send wrong signals to LWF member churches around the world". Lutheran priest Matthew Zickler, however, noted that people should pray for such a concept.

== See also ==
- Catholic–Protestant relations
- Ecumenical meetings and documents on Mary
- Porvoo Communion
- Bund für evangelisch-katholische Einheit
- Förbundet för Kristen Enhet
