= Anglican–Roman Catholic dialogue =

Historical communication between the Anglican Communion and the Catholic Church

The ecumenical relations between the Anglican Communion and the Roman Catholic Church were notably shaped after the Second Vatican Council (1962–1965).

== English Reformation ==
Conflict between the English Crown and the Holy See began in the period known as the English Reformation which began with the rejection of papal jurisdiction in England by the declaration of royal supremacy by King Henry VIII, followed in time by the confiscation of church properties, the dissolution of the monasteries, the execution of priests, forced attendance at Anglican worship, forced payment of tithes to the state church and the illegalisation of Roman Catholicism. There was a brief restoration of communion with Rome during the reign of Queen Mary I. Her death marked the end of Roman Catholic attempts to reconcile by law the Church in England to the Holy See.

Subsequently, Pope Pius V's excommunication of Queen Elizabeth I in 1570 and authorisation of rebellion against her contributed to official suspicion of the allegiances of English Catholics. This, combined with a desire to assert the claims of the established church, led initially to renewed persecution by the state, and to the continued enforcement of severe legal restrictions. Most of these restrictions were only relieved three centuries later through several legislative reforms in the 19th century, cumulatively known as Catholic emancipation. The last restriction on Roman Catholics excluding them from the throne of the United Kingdom (and by extension the other Commonwealth realms) remains, but since 2013 (provided for in right of the United Kingdom by the Succession to the Crown Act 2013) marriage to a Roman Catholic no longer bars succession.

== Oxford Movement and Anglo-Catholicism ==
Beginning in the 19th century, members of the Oxford Movement and Anglo-Catholics in the Church of England began promoting the inclusion of certain traditional aspects of liturgy from medieval religious practice, as they believed that Anglican practice had become too plain. In the ninetieth and final of the Tracts for the Times, John Henry Newman argued that the doctrines of the Roman Catholic Church, as defined by the Council of Trent, were compatible with the Thirty-Nine Articles of the 16th-century Church of England.

== Apostolicae curae ==
Although Catholic emancipation in the United Kingdom relieved some of the tension, the Roman Catholic response to the Chicago-Lambeth Quadrilateral was articulated in Apostolicae curae, an 1896 papal bull which declared Anglican holy orders "absolutely null and utterly void" and rejected Anglican positions on the branch theory and apostolic succession. The official reply of the archbishops of the Church of England was Saepius officio. The judgement remains in effect to the present.

== Malines Conversations ==
Some attempts at dialogue began in 1915, when Pope Benedict XV approved a British Legation to the Vatican, led by an Anglican with a Roman Catholic deputy. However, discussion of potential reunion in the Malines Conversations eventually collapsed in 1925. Continued efforts resulted in the spread of the Week of Prayer for Christian Unity in both churches (and others) and the visit of George Bell, the Anglican bishop of Chichester, to Cardinal Montini of Milan, later Pope Paul VI.

== Second Vatican Council ==
Real rapprochement was not achieved until the warming of Roman Catholic attitudes to ecumenism under the leadership of Pope John XXIII, whose foundation of the "Secretariat for the Promotion of Christian Unity" encouraged the then archbishop of Canterbury, Geoffrey Fisher, to make a historic, though not entirely official, visit to the Vatican in 1960.

Subsequently, the bishop of Ripon, John Moorman, led a delegation of Anglican observers to the Second Vatican Council. In 1966, the archbishop of Canterbury, Michael Ramsey, made an official visit to Pope Paul VI and, in the following year, the Anglican-Roman Catholic International Commission was established. Building on Pope Paul VI's description of the Anglican Church as "our beloved Sister Church", there has been considerable productivity in these discussions, but progress was not without difficulty.

== Anglican-Roman Catholic International Commission ==
Greater rapprochement was achieved in 1966, with the visit of Archbishop Michael Ramsey to Pope Paul VI. The following year, the Anglican-Roman Catholic International Commission was established. Its first project focused on the authority of scripture. The commission has since produced nine agreed statements. Phase One of ARCIC ended in 1981 with the publication of a final report, Elucidations on Authority in the Church.

Phase Two lasted between 1983 and 2004 and a third phase is expected. The most recent agreed statement dealt with Marian theology and was published in 2004. In 2000, following a successful meeting of Anglican and Roman Catholic bishops in Mississauga in Canada, a new commission, the International Anglican-Roman Catholic Commission for Unity and Mission, was established to promote practical co-operation between Anglicans and Roman Catholics and the reception of the fruits of the theological dialogue.

== Mariology ==
Much has been made of the difference between the Mariology of Anglicans and that of Roman Catholics, although Anglicanism does not have an official view about these doctrines. To encourage ecumenical cooperation despite differences over other matters, the Roman Catholic and Anglican churches issued a joint statement, "Mary: Grace and Hope in Christ" (also known as the Seattle Statement) on the role of the Virgin Mary in Christianity.

== International Anglican-Roman Catholic Commission for Unity and Mission ==
IARCCUM is a commission established by the Anglican Communion and the Roman Catholic Church as an official joint commission. IARCCUM exists in parallel with the Anglican-Roman Catholic International Commission, the theological commission known as ARCIC. IARCCUM's purpose is:

- to facilitate the development of strategies for translating the degree of spiritual communion that has been achieved into visible and practical outcomes;
- to promote and monitor the formal response and reception of the agreed statements of ARCIC;
- to strengthen relations between ARCIC and national Anglican-Roman Catholic Commissions (ARCs), and between different national ARCs, providing support and resources in order to foster an exchange of information and practice;
- to encourage Anglican Provinces and Roman Catholic Episcopal Conferences to establish ARC dialogues where they do not exist;
- to encourage Anglican and Roman Catholic bishops to develop projects and programmes of joint witness and mission in the world.

In 2000, George Carey, then archbishop of Canterbury, and Cardinal Edward Cassidy, then president of the Vatican's Pontifical Council for Promoting Christian Unity, convoked a conference of Anglican and Roman Catholic bishops in Mississauga in Canada to discern the progress made in theological conversations since the 1960s, and whether closer co-operation could be developed between the two traditions. The result was IARCCUM, which has been meeting since 2001. In February 2007, it published the first fruit of its work, the report "Growing Together in Unity and Mission", accompanied by two commentaries. IARCCUM's work continues under the co-chairmanship of Bishop Donald Bolen and Bishop David Hamid.

== Dialogue strained ==
Dialogue is strained by the developments in some provinces of the Anglican Communion, primarily concerning the ordination of women and the ordination of those in same-sex relationships as priests and, in one case, a bishop (Gene Robinson). In addition, the Second Vatican Council declared that the Anglican churches are only "ecclesial communities", saying that: "Among those in which some Catholic traditions and institutions continue to exist, the Anglican Communion occupies a special place."

In 2000, this view was authoritatively reiterated in the document Dominus Jesus issued by Cardinal Ratzinger with the approval of John Paul II. However, in conversation with the Anglican bishop of Gibraltar, Cardinal Walter Kasper, president of the Pontifical Council for Promoting Christian Unity, warned that if the Church of England was to ordain women as bishops, as the Episcopal Church has done, then it could destroy any chance of reuniting the Anglican and Roman Catholic churches. Although ARCIC had just completed the major document on Marian theology in 2003, Pope John Paul II officially called off all future talks between the Catholic Church and the Anglican Communion upon the consecration of Gene Robinson as a bishop.

== Anglican Use and personal ordinariates ==
In 1980, Pope John Paul II established a pastoral provision in the United States for Anglican congregations which as a whole wished to become Roman Catholic, allowing them to maintain much of the Anglican liturgy as the "Anglican Use", and also allowing the ordination of married former Anglican clergy as Roman Catholic priests. Until the formation of the ordinariate in 2009, only a small number of Anglican Use parishes existed.

Dominican writer Aidan Nichols wrote in 1993 that Anglicanism was three churches within one and that, as it stood, could not reunite with Rome, but that out of it could arise an Anglican particular church community accepting Roman authority.

On 4 November 2009, Pope Benedict XVI, in Anglicanorum coetibus, created a new canonical structure called a personal ordinariate by which groups of Anglicans may be corporately brought into communion with the Roman Catholic Church while retaining some aspects of their liturgical and spiritual practices which are not in contradiction with Roman Catholic doctrine.

In 2019, the archbishop of Canterbury, Justin Welby, responded to Anglican priests defecting to Rome in this way by saying ‘Who cares?’ and that he did not mind people leaving to join other denominations as long as they are 'faithful disciples of Christ.'

== Liturgical rules ==
According to Roman Catholic canon law, Roman Catholics should not receive the Anglican Eucharist. The law permits Roman Catholic priests to administer to an Anglican the sacraments of the Eucharist, Penance and the Anointing of the Sick only in danger of death or some other grave and pressing need and provided that the Anglican cannot approach an Anglican priest, spontaneously asks for the sacrament, demonstrates the faith of the Roman Catholic Church in respect of the sacrament and is properly disposed.

Cardinal Ratzinger commented on the celebrations of the Eucharist in other churches or ecclesial communities whose orders his church did not recognise, saying that "in such celebrations there was indeed a true feeding on Christ, and therefore there was a real and transforming grace." This was no new teaching as before Vatican II it was generally taught that, although considered invalid, Anglican orders were not meaningless and could carry God's grace.

== See also ==
- Catholic–Protestant relations
- Ecumenical meetings and documents on Mary
- Porvoo Communion
