= Pope Benedict XVI and ecumenism =

Ecumenism discourse

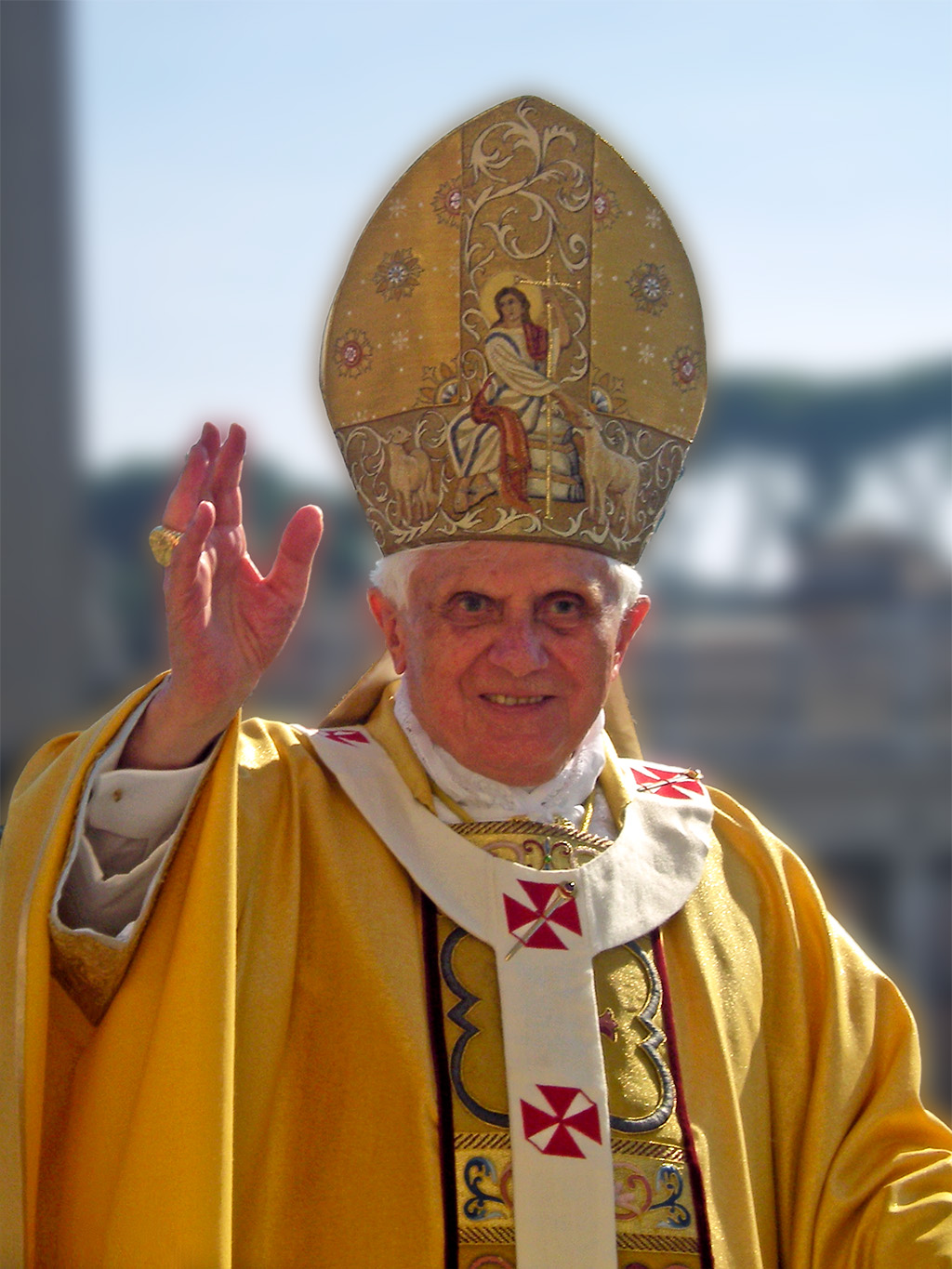
Pope Benedict XVI in October 2008

Pope Benedict XVI, who led the Roman Catholic Church as Pope from 2005 to 2013, continued manoeuvring the Church through the dynamics of modernity, which the Church had begun engaging in with the Second Vatican Council. Because the question of religious pluralism is a key issue raised by modernity, ecumenism, the establishment of harmony and dialogue between the different Christian denominations, is a significant concern of a post Second Vatican Council Church. Pope Benedict XVI's approach has been characterised as leaning toward the conservative while still being expansive and engaged, involving the full breadth of Christendom, including the Orthodox Churches and Protestant churches, as well as freshly engaging with other Christian bodies considered by Roman Catholics to be more heterodox, such as the Church of Jesus Christ of Latter-day Saints.

== Ecumenical theology ==
One of the more delicate ecumenical questions addressed during the pontificate of Benedict XVI relates to an ambiguous phrase in the Vatican II decree on the Church. Traditionally the Catholic Church had taught that "the Mystical Body of Christ and the Roman Catholic Church are one and the same thing," as Pope Pius XII put it in 1950 (encyclical 'Humani generis', par. 27). Because the Vatican II document "Lumen Gentium" did not use this expression but said that the Church of Christ "subsists in" the Catholic Church, some commentators believed this reflected a change in doctrine; the implication of this would be that the mystical Church is represented not exclusively in the Catholic Church but in other Christian denominations, giving recognition to them. To resolve this confusion, Pope Benedict XVI directed the Congregation for the Doctrine of the Faith to issue a clarification, issued on 29 June 2007 and stating that "the Second Vatican Council neither changed nor intended to change" the Catholic doctrine of the Church. A similar explanation had already been given by the same Congregation in 1985. The June 2007 clarification, approved by the Pope, restated the Catholic Church's position that because their hierarchies represent a break in the historic episcopate (called the "apostolic succession"), Protestant denominations "are not true Churches" and are instead termed 'ecclesial communities', as contrasted with Orthodox communities, which have bishops in the apostolic line and are therefore considered true, if deficient, churches. Pope Benedict has also reiterated his church's view about the supposed invalidity of Anglican orders.

The clarification was met with protest by a number of Christian denominations which regarded it as damaging to their ecumenical efforts. The Evangelical Lutheran Church of Denmark spoke of a "destructive effect on ecumenical relations if one church deprives another church of the right to be called a church." The content of the clarification was dismissed by Seventh-day Adventists as "nothing more than tradition". The World Alliance of Reformed Churches commented that the document "makes us question the seriousness with which the Roman Catholic Church takes its dialogues with the Reformed family and other families of the church." The leading Lutheran cleric in Germany Bishop Wolfgang Huber criticised the letter for its undiplomatic language rather than its theological content, saying "it would also be completely sufficient if it were to be said that the reforming churches are 'not churches in the sense required here' or that they are 'churches of another type'—but none of these bridges is used" in the Vatican document."

Others, such as Rev. Sara MacVane, of the Anglican Centre in Rome, saw it as in line with the previous position of the Church but questioned the timing of its release, saying "I don't know what motivated it at this time." The Russian Orthodox Church, however, called the document "honest", noting that it contains nothing new and was conducive to "an honest theological dialogue." The issuing of this document and the recent allowance made by Benedict XVI for more widespread use of the traditional Tridentine Mass were seen by some of his critics as a move towards conservatism and some "raised questions about Benedict’s commitment to the changes made during the Second Vatican Council", which had set the direction of the Catholic Church's ecumenical initiatives. Benedict XVI himself, however, has presented such moves as an effort to preserve the legacy of Vatican II by implementing an authoritative interpretation of the Council through a "hermeneutic of continuity" which locates it in the context of the Church tradition.

== Relations with traditionalist Catholics ==
Although the question of relations between the Holy See and disaffected traditionalist Catholics is more a question of internal Church discipline than of ecumenism in the strict sense, this issue reflects Benedict's larger concern for promoting Christian unity under the mantle of the papacy. On 29 August 2006, Pope Benedict XVI met with Bishop Bernard Fellay, superior general of the traditionalist Society of St. Pius X, an international society of traditionalist Roman Catholic priests, which since 1975 has existed in a state of dispute with the leadership of the Roman Catholic Church. Bishop Fellay had previously issued a statement welcoming the election of Cardinal Ratzinger as Pope. Bishop Fellay and the three other bishops of the SSPX were declared to have been automatically excommunicated in 1988 when Archbishop Marcel Lefebvre consecrated them as bishops without the permission of the reigning pontiff John Paul II. Shortly before the illicit episcopal consecrations Cardinal Ratzinger and Archbishop Lefebvre had signed a protocol agreeing to study difficulties raised by the liturgical reform and the Second Vatican Council, but ultimately the accord came to nothing. As pope, Benedict XVI has made it a priority to heal the rift that was nearly avoided in 1988. To this end, in January 2009 the pontiff approved a decree lifting the excommunications on the leaders of the Society, making the possibility of unity between the wider Church and the SSPX more likely. On 10 March 2009, Pope Benedict wrote a letter to the bishops of the Catholic Church, saying that "an unforeseen mishap for me was the fact that the Williamson case came on top of the remission of the excommunication. The discreet gesture of mercy towards four Bishops ordained validly but not legitimately suddenly appeared as something completely different: as the repudiation of reconciliation between Christians and Jews ... Another mistake, which I deeply regret, is the fact that the extent and limits of the provision of 21 January 2009 were not clearly and adequately explained at the moment of its publication."

== Relations with other denominations ==
=== Orthodoxy ===
==== Eastern Orthodox ====
The bishops of the Ecumenical Eastern Orthodox Patriarchate of Constantinople have expressed concern over Pope Benedict XVI's decision to strike out "patriarch of the West" from his official titles in the Vatican yearbook. In an 8 June 2006 statement, the chief secretary of the Orthodox bishops' synod said dropping "patriarch of the West" while retaining the titles "vicar of Jesus Christ" and "supreme pontiff of the universal church" is "perceived as implying a universal jurisdiction of the bishop of Rome over the entire church, a claim that the Orthodox have never accepted." The statement was issued after synod members discussed the change during their early June meeting. Cardinal Walter Kasper, president of the Pontifical Council for Promoting Christian Unity, said in a March statement that dropping the title of patriarch in reference to the pope does not minimize the importance of the patriarchal office, particularly in relation to the ancient Eastern churches. "Even less can this suppression be seen as implying new claims" of power or authority on the part of the Vatican, he said. However, members of the Orthodox synod disagreed. From their point of view, "the geographical limits of each ecclesiastical jurisdiction" have been a key part of the structure of the church from the earliest days of Christianity. The church as a whole is "a unity of full local churches" and not a monolith divided into local units simply for the sake of easier governance. The Orthodox synod's statement said that, with the international Catholic-Orthodox theological dialogue set to begin again in September with plans to deal with the "thorny problem" of papal primacy, it would have been better not to have removed the title without consultation.

A leading Ukrainian Orthodox spokesman has said that a visit to Ukraine by Pope Benedict XVI would be "untimely", according to the country's RISU news service. "If Pope Benedict is a moral and a spiritual person and wants only good for Ukraine and its people, he will never take such an unreasonable step," said Valentyn Lukianyk, the head of the Union of Orthodox Brotherhoods of Ukraine. He was responding to the news that Ukrainian President Viktor Yushchenko has invited the Pope to visit the country. After the collapse of the Soviet Union there have been numerous clashes between Orthodox and Catholic believers over the ownership of parish properties that were confiscated by the Communists and handed over to the Russian Orthodox Church. At the same time, Orthodox leaders have complained that Catholics are engaged in "proselytism", seeking converts among Orthodox believers. In his statement opposing a papal visit, Lukianyk said that relations between Catholics and Orthodox in Ukraine are now "warming." A visit by Pope Benedict, he said, would place an undue burden on those sensitive ties.

Archbishop Christodoulos, Archbishop of Athens, visited Pope Benedict XVI at the Vatican on 13 December 2006. It was the first official visit by a Church of Greece leader to the Vatican. Archbishop Christodoulos was present for the funeral of Pope John Paul II. The Ecumenical Patriarch of Constantinople, Bartholomew I, with other Orthodox prelates also were present for the funeral Mass, but did not participate liturgically.

"Inaugurating the year of St. Paul in 2008, Pope Benedict XVI met with Patriarch Bartholomew I of Constantinople. Celebrating the Feast of Apostles Peter and Paul in St. Peter’s Basilica together, both pastors delivered homilies reflecting on the respective missions of Peter and Paul, whose relationship has always held so much significance for Catholic-Orthodox relations. Patriarch Bartholomew I, especially, stressed how Peter and Paul had become brothers in their martyrdom, and how in Orthodox icons they are often portrayed exchanging a “holy kiss.” The Orthodox patriarch reflected on how, in celebrating the Feast of the Apostles Peter and Paul, that holy kiss is shared once more as a witness to all people."

==== Assyrian Church of the East ====
Also in 2008, a diocese of the Assyrian Apostolic Church reunited with the Catholic Church, recognizing the authority of Benedict XVI.

=== Protestants ===
In 2005, Pope Benedict sent a message to the national synod of the Reformed Church of France, the country’s main Protestant community, who thanked the Pontiff for this “gesture of consideration.”

In more general terms, Pope Benedict addressed Protestant churches in a speech during his trip to Cologne, Germany in 2005, discussing a "renewed sense of our brotherhood" and "a more open and trusting climate between Christians belonging to the various Churches and Ecclesial Communities."

According to John L. Allen, Jr.'s Cardinal Ratzinger, the Pope, a German himself, feels a bond towards Lutherans and has Lutheran friends. Allen, in fact, compares the then Cardinal Ratzinger's feelings towards Lutherans to the feelings John Paul had for Orthodox Christians in that both men wanted a divided Christendom to be reunited. The Pope is said to be rather ambivalent towards Martin Luther.

In 2006 Pope Benedict met with Rowan Williams, Archbishop of Canterbury and spiritual head of the Anglican Communion. They issued a Common Declaration, highlighting the previous 40 years of dialogue between Catholics and Anglicans while also acknowledging "serious obstacles to our ecumenical progress." In January 2008, he also met with John Sentamu, Archbishop of York.

==== Ordinariates for former Anglicans ====
On 20 October 2009, Cardinal William Levada, prefect of the Congregation for the Doctrine of the Faith and Archbishop Joseph DiNoia, secretary of the Congregation for Divine Worship and the Discipline of the Sacraments and formerly Under-Secretary of the Congregation for the Doctrine of the Faith held a press conference in which it was revealed that Pope Benedict was preparing to release an as yet unnamed apostolic constitution which would allow some Anglicans, both laity and those in holy orders. According to the statement detailing the plans, the unnamed constitution would see "pastoral oversight and guidance [being] provided for groups of former Anglicans through a Personal Ordinariate, whose Ordinary will usually be appointed from among former Anglican clergy."

It is envisaged that the ordination of married former Anglican clergy will not be a major issue due to the fact that it has become relatively commonplace since the Pastoral Provision was instituted in 1980. The Vatican note drew the line at the prospect of married bishops; "historical and ecumenical reasons preclude the ordination of married men as bishops in both the Catholic and Orthodox Churches," the release said. "The Constitution therefore stipulates that the Ordinary can be either a priest or an unmarried bishop." During the conference Cardinal Levada aimed to compare the new ordinariates to the national diocesan structures overseeing a country's military forces. The de facto result of the move is an Anglican Rite within the Catholic Church. Like the military churches, however, the structures will ostensibly be nationwide, established after consultation with the episcopal conferences. A joint statement on the new protocol from Archbishop Vincent Nichols of Westminster and the Anglican Communion's head, Archbishop Rowan Williams of Canterbury, occurred at the same time in London.

On 31 October 2009, the Holy See released a statement clarifying the rules of celibacy in the as yet unnamed constitution. The statement quoted sections of the apostolic constitution which said that:"Those who ministered as Anglican deacons, priests, or bishops, and who fulfill the requisites established by canon law and are not impeded by irregularities or other impediments may be accepted by the Ordinary as candidates for Holy Orders in the Catholic Church. In the case of married clergy, the norms established in the encyclical of Pope Paul VI, Sacerdotalis coelibatus (n. 42) and in the statement "In June" are to be observed. Unmarried clergy must submit to the norm of clerical celibacy of CIC can. 277, §1."

§2. The Ordinary, in full observance of the discipline of celibate clergy in the Latin Church, as a rule (pro regula) will admit only celibate men to the order of presbyter. He may also petition the Roman Pontiff, as a derogation from can. 277, §1, for the admission of married men to the order of presbyter on a case by case basis, according to objective criteria approved by the Holy See. See Personal ordinariate.

In October 2010 several Anglican bishops including John Broadhurst, the Bishop of Fulham, announced plans to become Roman Catholics under the new rules. An Anglican ordinariate in the U.S. was launched in January 2012. More than 1,300 Anglicans, including 100 Anglican priests, have applied to be part of the new body, essentially a non-geographical diocese. In England, at least 20 clergy and several hundred of their parishioners from the Church of England are expected to join the ordinariate in 2012, following the 60 clergy and about 1,000 lay people who left in 2011.

=== Latter-day Saints ===
During Pope Benedict's trip to the United States in 2008, representatives of The Church of Jesus Christ of Latter-day Saints were invited to attend an ecumenical prayer service with the pope for the first time. A representative for the U.S. Conference of Catholic Bishops commented that there are a variety of ways the two religions can work together while acknowledging their theological differences.
