= Joint Declaration on the Doctrine of Justification =

1999 text resulting from an extensive ecumenical dialogue

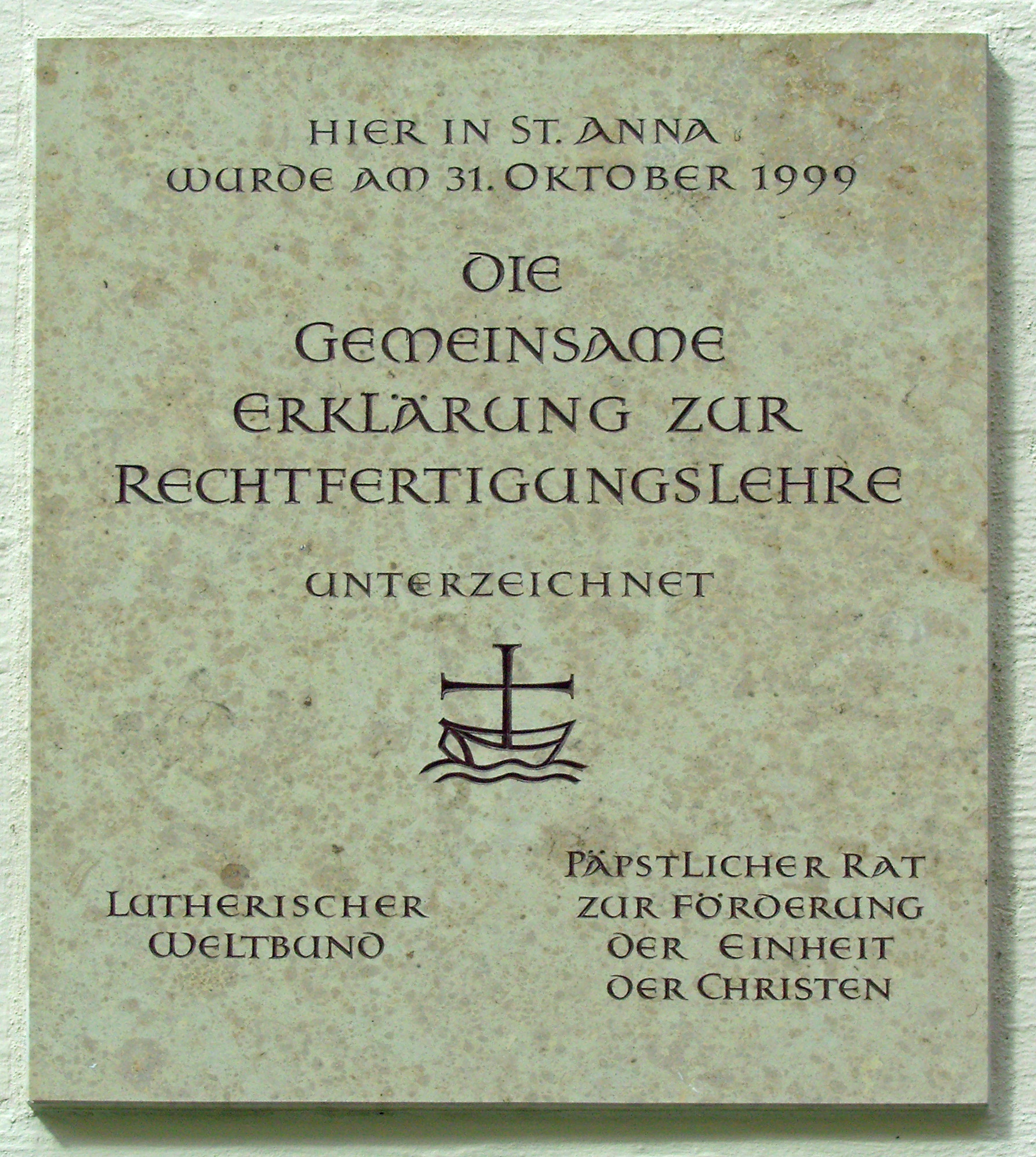
Plaque commemorating the Joint Declaration at St. Anne's Church, Augsburg

The "Joint Declaration on the Doctrine of Justification" (JDDJ) is a document created and agreed to by the Catholic Church's Pontifical Council for Promoting Christian Unity (PCPCU) and the Lutheran World Federation in 1999 as a result of Catholic–Lutheran dialogue. It states that the churches now share "a common understanding of our justification by God's grace through faith in Christ." To the parties involved, this substantially resolves much of the 500-year-old conflict over the nature of justification which was at the root of the Protestant Reformation. The Joint Declaration on the Doctrine of Justification teaches that "good works are a genuine response to God's grace, not the cause of it".

Through the Joint Declaration on the Doctrine of Justification, "the formal condemnations of both the Catholic and Lutheran Churches against one another" were rescinded. As a result of the same, Lutheran bishop H. George Anderson stated that "there is an increasing common faith" and that those joined in Lutheran-Catholic interdenominational marriages "share a common faith instead of coming at it from two separate traditions." Catholic brother Jeffrey Gros, the associate director of the Secretariat for Ecumenical and Interreligious Affairs, held that Catholics and Lutherans should be thankful to God "for the grace they've received in the death and resurrection of Jesus Christ" and that "We've learned, both through our scholarship and also through our face-to-face dialogue, that we believe this together". Gros noted that due to being in agreement on the doctrine of justification, the Catholic–Lutheran dialogue would lead to finding agreement on other theological issues.

As of 2017, the bodies representing 75% of the world's Christians have formally affirmed the Joint Declaration. Now as a five-way agreement between the Roman Catholic Church, the Lutheran World Federation, the World Methodist Council, the Anglican Communion, and the World Communion of Reformed Churches, it is, however, not without controversy.

== Approach ==
The intention of the Joint Declaration is as follows:

"The present Joint Declaration has this intention: namely, to show that on the basis of their dialogue the subscribing Lutheran churches and the Roman Catholic Church are now able to articulate a common understanding of our justification by God’s grace through faith in Christ. It does not cover all that either church teaches about justification; it does encompass a consensus on basic truths of the doctrine of justification and shows that the remaining differences in its explication are no longer the occasion for doctrinal condemnations.

— "Joint Declaration on the Doctrine of Justification" cl. 5

The PCPCU and the Lutheran World Federation acknowledge in the declaration that the excommunications relating to the doctrine of justification set forth by the Council of Trent do not apply to the teachings of the Lutheran churches set forth in the text; likewise, the churches acknowledged that the condemnations set forth in the Lutheran Confessions do not apply to the Catholic teachings on justification set forth in the document.

The common understanding of Justification is given in simple confessions such as

"Together we confess: By grace alone, in faith in Christ's saving work and not because of any merit on our part, we are accepted by God and receive the Holy Spirit, who renews our hearts while equipping and calling us to good works."

— "Joint Declaration on the Doctrine of Justification" cl. 15

The Joint Declaration lists the main distinctive emphases of the different communions who have affirmed the declaration: their bottom lines. It explains the emphases, and couches them as approaching the same common doctrine from different angles rather than necessarily the one contradicting the other, or saying which angle is best. As well as explaining the "emphasis" from the view of the communion that holds it, the Joint Declaration also address the main problems identified or misinterpretated by the other party. For example:

"When Catholics affirm the “meritorious” character of good works, they wish to say that, according to the biblical witness, a reward in heaven is promised to these works. Their intention is to emphasize the responsibility of persons for their actions, not to contest the character of those works as gifts, or far less to deny that justification always remains the unmerited gift of grace."

— "Joint Declaration on the Doctrine of Justification" cl. 38

The Joint Declaration avoids mention or treatment of several issues of historical contention: "free will", "predestination", "original sin", "total depravity", "indulgence", "satisfaction", and "sanctification". (The Methodist Statement of Association with the Joint Declaration does include discussion of sanctification.)

It footnotes "For Lutherans and Catholics, the doctrine of justification has a different status in the hierarchy of truth; but both sides agree that the doctrine of justification...is the touchstone for testing at all times whether a particular interpretation of our relationship to God can claim the name of 'Christian'."

== Reception ==
Support for the joint declaration was not universal among Lutherans. Of the 124 members of the Lutheran World Federation, 35 cast votes against JDDJ; these included many churches who are also members of the International Lutheran Council. Member churches of the Confessional Evangelical Lutheran Conference even stated that "JDDJ [...] should be repudiated by all Lutherans."

Some Catholics have raised other objections. Some contend that the Lutheran signers do not have the required authority to represent their communities (since, from a Catholic perspective, they are not full churches) and, therefore, that no Lutheran can make the agreement binding on the constituents of the Lutheran World Federation. The final paragraph of the Annex to the Official Common Statement, however, settles this matter.

Other Catholics object to the statement itself, arguing that it is out of line with the Council of Trent, but the document is clear that it is not negating or contradicting any statements from Trent; rather, it is arguing for the non-applicability of its canons to concrete Christian bodies in the modern world. The document was approved by the Vatican under the auspices of the PCPCU, which was established by Pope John XXIII at the Second Vatican Council and is headed by a Catholic bishop; thus, the declaration is (at least) an exercise of the ordinary magisterium of the bishops who authorized the statement. A clarification was issued jointly by the PCPCU and the Congregation for the Doctrine of the Faith, which is also an exercise of the ordinary magisterium.

On 18 July 2006, the World Methodist Council, meeting in Seoul, South Korea, voted unanimously to adopt the document.

In 1986 the Anglican-Roman Catholic International Commission (ARCIC) produced a statement called "Salvation and the Church", which observed that the two Communions are agreed on the essential aspects of the doctrine of salvation and on the Church’s role within it. Consequently, in 2016, Anglican Consultative Council Resolution 16.17 "welcomes and affirms the substance of the Joint Declaration on the Doctrine of Justification (JDDJ), signed by Lutherans and Roman Catholics in 1999", in the St. Anne's Church in Augsburg, Germany.

The leadership of the World Communion of Reformed Churches—representing 80 million members of Congregational, Presbyterian, Reformed, United, Uniting and Waldensian churches—also signed the document and formally associated with it at an ecumenical prayer service on 5 July 2017.

The 2019 edition of the Joint Declaration includes statements by the Methodist and Reformed bodies detailing the nature and extent of their affirmation, so that their "distinctive emphases" and where their theology goes beyond the consensus are represented.

In 2021, a Baptist theologian suggested that World Baptist Alliance could also assent to the Joint Declaration.

Orthodox theologian Nicolas Kazarian suggests that many of the ideas involved in the Protestant-Catholic disputes on justification (original sin, merit, imputation) do not resonate with Orthodox thought, but notes a 1998 Lutheran-Orthodox study document "Salvation: Grace, Justification and Synergy."
