= Pope Paul VI and ecumenism =

After the Second Vatican Council, Pope Paul VI contributed in two ways to the continued growth of ecumenism and inter-Christian dialogue. The separated brothers and sisters, as he called them, were not able to contribute to the Second Vatican Council as invited observers. After the Council, many of them took initiative to seek out their Catholic counterparts and the Pope in Rome, who welcomed such visits.

== Archbishop of Milan ==
Some considered him a liberal, when he asked lay people to love not only Catholics but also schismatics (Eastern Orthodox and Oriental Orthodox), Protestants (such as Lutherans and Anglicans), the indifferent, Muslims, pagans, atheists. Contrary to Church teachings from Pope Leo XIII (and later John Paul II and Benedict XVI) which regarded Anglican Clergy as unequal in light of their deemed lack of apostolic succession, Archbishop Montini simply ignored this aspect altogether during a visit of Anglican clergy in Milan in 1957 and a subsequent exchange of letters with the Archbishop of Canterbury, Geoffrey Fisher.

== The role of the Second Vatican Council ==
The Catholic Church itself recognized from the many previous ecumenical encounters, that much needed to be done within, in order to be an open partner for ecumenism. To those who are entrusted the highest and deepest truth and therefore, so Paul VI, believed that he had the most difficult part to communicate. Ecumenical dialogue in the view of Paul VI requires from a Catholic the whole person: ones entire reason and will as well as a totally open heart. Paul VI, like Pius XII before him, was reluctant to give in on a lowest possible point.

And yet, Paul felt compelled to admit his ardent Gospel-based desire to be everything to everybody and to help all people Being the successor of Peter, he felt the words of Christ, "Do you love me more" like a sharp knife penetrating to the marrow of his soul. These words meant to Paul VI love without limits, and they underscore the Church's fundamental approach to ecumenism.

== Relationship with the World Council of Churches ==
In 1965, Paul VI decided on the creation of a joint working group with the World Council of Churches in order to map all possible avenues of dialogue and cooperation. In the following three years, eight sessions were held which resulted in a number of joint proposals. It was proposed to work closely together in areas of social justice and development and Third World Issues such as hunger and poverty. On the religious side, it was agreed to share together in the Week of Prayer for Christian Unity, to be held every year. The joint working group was to prepare texts which were to be used by all Christians. On 19 July 1968, the meeting of the World Council of Churches took place in Uppsala, Sweden, which Pope Paul called a sign of the times. He sent his blessing in an ecumenical manner: "May the Lord bless everything you do for the case of Christian Unity." The World Council of Churches decided on including Catholic Theologians in its committees, provided they have the backing of the Vatican.

Paul VI actively supported the newfound harmony and cooperation with Protestants on so many levels. When Cardinal Augustin Bea went to see him for permission for a joint Catholic-Protestant translation of the Bible with Protestant Bible societies, the Pope walked towards him and exclaimed, "as far as the cooperation with Bible societies is concerned, I am totally in favour." He issued a formal approval on Pentecost 1967, the feast on which the Holy Spirit descended on the Christians, overcoming all linguistic difficulties, according to Christian tradition.

== Dialogue with the Eastern Orthodox Churches ==
Paul VI visited the Orthodox Patriarchs of Jerusalem and Constantinople in 1964 and 1967. He was the first pope since the ninth century to visit the East, labeling the Eastern Churches as sister Churches. He was also the first pope in centuries to meet the heads of various Eastern Orthodox faiths. Notably, his meeting with Ecumenical Patriarch Athenagoras I in 1964 in Jerusalem led to rescinding the excommunications of the Great Schism, which took place in 1054.

This was a significant step towards restoring communion between Rome and Constantinople. It produced the Catholic-Orthodox Joint declaration of 1965, which was read out on 7 December 1965, simultaneously at a public meeting of the Second Vatican Council in Rome and at a special ceremony in Istanbul. The declaration did not end the schism, but showed a desire for greater reconciliation between the two churches.

== Dialogue with the Oriental Orthodox Churches ==
In May 1973, the Coptic Pope Shenouda III of Alexandria visited the Vatican, where he met three times with Pope Paul VI. A common declaration and a joint Creed issued at the conclusion of the visit demonstrated that there are virtually no more theological discrepancies between the Coptic and Roman Catholic Churches.

== Dialogue with Churches having their origins in the Reformation ==
=== Lutherans ===
The Lutherans were the first Christian Church offering a dialogue to the Catholic Church in September 1964 in Reykjavík, Iceland. It resulted in joint study groups of several issues. The President of the Lutheran World Federation and member of the central committee of the World Council of Churches Fredrik A. Schiotz stated during the 450th anniversary of the Reformation, that in the past, commemorations were viewed almost as a triumph. Reformation should be celebrated as a thanksgiving to God, his truth and his renewed life. He welcomed the announcement of Pope Paul VI to celebrate the 1900th anniversary of the death of the Apostle Peter and Apostle Paul, and promised the participation and cooperation in the festivities.

=== Reformed ===
The Reformed Churches entered four years later into a dialogue with the Catholic Church.

=== Anglicans ===
Paul was the first pope to receive an Anglican Archbishop of Canterbury, Michael Ramsey in official audience as Head of Church, after the private audience visit of Archbishop Geoffrey Fisher to Pope John XXIII on 2 December 1960. Ramsey met Paul three times during his visit and opened the Anglican Center in Rome with the purpose of increasing their mutual knowledge. He praised Paul VI and his contributions in the service of unity. Paul replied that "by entering into our house, you are entering your own house, we are happy to open our door and heart to you."

The two Church leaders signed a common declaration, which put an end to the disputes of the past and outlined a common agenda for the future. Cardinal Augustin Bea, the head of the Secretariat for Promoting Christian Unity added at the end of the visit, "Let us move forward in Christ. God wants it. Humanity is waiting for it." Unmoved by a harsh condemnation by the Congregation of Faith on mixed marriages precisely at this time of the visit, Paul VI and Ramsey appointed a preparatory commission which was to put the common agenda into practice on such issues as mixed marriages. This resulted in a joint Malta declaration, the first ever joint agreement on the Creed since the reformation. Paul VI was a good friend of the Anglican Church, which he described as "our beloved sister Church", a description not allowed later by John Paul II and Benedict XVI in Dominus Iesus, which denied Church character to Anglican and Protestant churches because of an alleged absence of apostolic succession.

=== Methodists ===
The dialogue with the Methodist Church began October 1965, after its representatives officially applauded remarkable changes, friendship and cooperation of the past five years.
