= Teresa Okure =

Nigerian Catholic nun

Teresa Okure is a Nigerian Catholic nun. She was the first African to become a member of the Society of the Holy Child Jesus. She is a Professor in residence of the Department of Bible Theology, at the Catholic Institute of West Africa, Port Harcourt, Nigeria. Okure teaches New Testament and Gender Hermeneutics, and has taught at the Institute since 1999. She earned her Ph.D at Fordham University, New York in 1984 In 2013, she was noted as a possible candidate for appointment as a female cardinal by Pope Francis.

== Works ==
- The Johannine Approach to Mission (1988)
- To Cast Fire Upon the Earth (2000)
