= Pastoral Provision =

Catholic permissions for to Anglican converts

The Pastoral Provision is a set of practices and norms in the Catholic Church in the United States, by which bishops are authorized to provide spiritual care for Catholics converting from the Anglican tradition, by establishing parishes for them and ordaining priests from among them. The provision provides a way for individuals to become priests in territorial dioceses, even after Pope Benedict XVI's apostolic constitution Anglicanorum Coetibus established the Personal Ordinariates, a non-diocesan mechanism for former Anglicans to join the Church.

== History ==
=== Background ===
Since at least the early 1950s, former Anglican, Lutheran and other clergy who join the Catholic Church have been granted exceptions to the norm of celibacy, in a practice mentioned in Pope Paul VI's encyclical Sacerdotalis caelibatus of 1967.

In 1977, some of those who desired union with the Catholic Church contacted individual Catholic bishops, the Apostolic Delegate Archbishop Jean Jadot and the Congregation for the Doctrine of the Faith in Rome, to inquire about the possibility for married Anglican priests to be received into the Catholic Church and function as Catholic priests.

In 1979, after the United States National Conference of Catholic Bishops and the Congregation for the Doctrine of the Faith had reacted favourably to the proposals that had been put before them, a formal request for union was presented in Rome on 3 November for acceptance into the Roman Catholic Church, for steps to be taken to eliminate any defects that might be found in their priestly orders, and that they be granted the oversight, direction, and governance of a Catholic bishop.

The decision of the Holy See was officially communicated in a letter of 22 July 1980 from the Congregation for the Doctrine of the Faith to the President of the United States episcopal conference, who published it on 20 August 1980.

=== Announcement ===
The provision was authorized by Pope John Paul II in 1980 and announced in 1981, in response to requests from former United States Episcopalians and members of the Continuing Anglican movement. It allows diocesan bishops to establish personal parishes for former Anglicans, which use the liturgical forms of the Book of Divine Worship that keeps some elements of the Anglican liturgy. These forms of the Roman Rite are known as Anglican Use.

The provision also enables bishops to ordain married former clergy as diocesan priests, when the Holy See grants a dispensation from the usual rule requiring Latin Rite Catholic priests to be celibate (i.e., unmarried).

Since 1981, over 100 ordinations have taken place under the Pastoral Provision, and several personal parishes were established within dioceses. Starting in 2012, most of those parishes were transferred from their dioceses to a new nationwide jurisdiction, the Personal Ordinariate of the Chair of Saint Peter.

In March 1981, the Vatican appointed then Most Rev. Bernard Francis Law, then Bishop of Springfield-Cape Girardeau and subsequently Archbishop of Boston, Cardinal, and Archpriest of the Basilica of St. Mary Major, as the Ecclesiastical Delegate. The Vatican subsequently appointed Most Rev. John J. Myers, Archbishop of Newark, to this post in 2003 and Most Rev. Kevin W. Vann, then Bishop of Fort Worth and now Bishop of Orange, to this post in 2011. Rev. William H. Stetson, a priest of the Personal Prelature Opus Dei, is Secretary to the Ecclesiastical Delegate.

The Congregation for Divine Worship gave provisional approval for the group's liturgy, the Book of Divine Worship, in 1984, an approval rendered definitive in 1987. This book incorporates elements of the 1928 Book of Common Prayer, but the Eucharistic liturgy is from the 1979 Book, with the Eucharistic Prayers taken from the Roman Missal and the ancient Sarum Rite (with the modern English Words of Institution inserted in the latter).

The number of personal parishes established is only 7, but, since 1983 over 80 former Anglicans have been ordained for priestly ministry in various Catholic dioceses of the United States.

=== Personal Ordinariate era ===
The Vatican erected the Personal Ordinariate of the Chair of St. Peter, a jurisdiction canonically equivalent to a diocese, for former Anglicans in the United States and Canada on 1 January 2012, and appointed then-Rev. Jeffrey N. Steenson, a married priest ordained under the pastoral provision who formerly had served as the Bishop of the Rio Grande in The Episcopal Church, as the first "ordinary" of this jurisdiction, subsequently naming him an apostolic protonotary (the highest rank of monsignor). The "ordinary" is canonically equivalent to a diocesan bishop, but receives episcopal ordination only if he is celibate. In 2015, the Vatican appointed then-Msgr. Steven Lopes, who was ordained as a bishop at his installation, as the second ordinary of this jurisdiction.

In 2017 the Vatican ordered that all parishes within the Pastoral Provision enter into the Personal Ordinariate. As of late 2017, only one chaplaincy in the Roman Catholic Archdiocese of Boston established under the Pastoral Provision remains in diocesan jurisdiction, after the parish in San Antonio was transferred to the Ordinariate. It was expected that the Boston congregation would eventually be transferred also. The Pastoral Provision remained in force for married former Anglican clergy petitioning for orders in any diocese that is not the Personal Ordinariate of the Chair of St. Peter.

== Structure ==
Though admittance of the Episcopalians in question to the Catholic Church was considered as reconciliation of individuals, a pastoral provision or statute gave them a common group identity.

That identity involved the possibility, after a period of being subject to the local Latin Church bishop, of being granted some distinct type of structure; the use, with the group, but not outside it, of a form of liturgy that retained certain elements of the Anglican liturgy; married Episcopalian priests may be ordained as Catholic priests, but not as bishops.

An Ecclesiastical Delegate, a Catholic who is preferably a bishop, was appointed to oversee the implementation of the decision and to coordinate with the Congregation.

== Married priests ==
As of November 2012, approximately 70 married men have been ordained as priests under the Pastoral Provision. This number does not include married former Protestant clergy, whose petitions for dispensation from the norm of celibacy continue to go through the normal channels. The majority of married diocesan priests historically have not served as pastors of diocesan parishes, though there are now some exceptions. A few priests work at secular occupations to support their families, but the majority serve in chaplaincies and in teaching or administrative positions.

== See also ==
- Anglican Communion
- Anglican-Roman Catholic dialogue
- Anglicanorum coetibus
- Anglo-Catholicism
- Catholic Church hierarchy#Equivalents of diocesan bishops in law
- Clerical celibacy (Catholic Church)
- Continuing Anglican movement
- Ecumenism
- Forward in Faith
- Paul van K. Thomson
- Personal Ordinariate
- Pontifical Council for Promoting Christian Unity
- Sacerdotalis caelibatus
- Vincent Nichols
