= Henry VIII =

King of England from 1509 to 1547

- Portrait of Henry VIII, c. 1540–1547

King of England
- Reign: 22 April 1509 (Note: Henry's regnal years are dated from 22 April.) – 28 January 1547
- Coronation: 24 June 1509
- Predecessor: Henry VII
- Successor: Edward VI
- Born: 28 June 1491; Palace of Placentia, Greenwich, England
- Died: 28 January 1547 (aged 55); Palace of Whitehall, Westminster, England
- Burial: 16 February 1547; St George's Chapel, Windsor Castle, Berkshire
- Spouses: Catherine of Aragon (m. 1509; ann. 1533) (Note: Annulment reversed posthumously during the reign of Mary I in 1553.) Anne Boleyn (m. 1532; ann. 1536) (Note: Henry and Anne married in secret on 14 November 1532, which was followed by second wedding on 25 January 1533.) Jane Seymour (m. 1536; died 1537) Anne of Cleves (m. 1540; ann. 1540) Catherine Howard (m. 1540; died 1542) Catherine Parr (m. 1543)
- Issue more...: Henry, Duke of Cornwall; Mary I; Elizabeth I; Edward VI; Henry FitzRoy, Duke of Richmond and Somerset (ill.)
- House: Tudor
- Father: Henry VII of England
- Mother: Elizabeth of York
- Religion: Catholic (1491–1534); Church of England (1534–1547)

Henry VIII (28 June 1491 – 28 January 1547) (Note: Dates in this article before 14 September 1752 are given in the Julian calendar, which was used in England and Ireland during Henry's lifetime. However, years are assumed to begin on 1 January instead of 25 March, the English New Year.) was King of England from 22 April 1509 until his death in 1547. He is known for his six marriages, his break with the Roman Catholic Church, and his establishment of the Church of England.

Born in Greenwich, Henry was the second son of Henry VII and Elizabeth of York. This placed him second in the line of succession to the throne, behind his elder brother Arthur, Prince of Wales. Arthur's sudden death in 1502 made Henry the heir apparent, and he was created Prince of Wales in 1504. Henry inherited the throne at 17 years old, after the death of his father. He was granted a papal dispensation that allowed him to marry his brother's widow, Catherine of Aragon. In the early years of his reign, Henry was described as an attractive, educated, and accomplished king.

Henry grew dissatisfied with the marriage to Catherine, appealing to Pope Clement VII for an annulment so that he could remarry in pursuit of a male heir. Clement refused, and Archbishop of Canterbury Thomas Cranmer declared the marriage void in the eyes of the Church of England in 1533. Clement objected to Cranmer's verdict and excommunicated Henry from the Catholic Church. Henry then passed the Acts of Supremacy, establishing himself as Supreme Head of the Church of England and thereby relieving his realms from obedience to the pope. He dissolved Catholic monasteries and seized their wealth, contributing to the English Reformation.

He ordered the beheadings of two of his wives, Anne Boleyn and Catherine Howard. Considered one of the greatest monarchs in English history, Henry grew more tyrannical, egotistical, lustful, and paranoid by the end of his life. In his later years, Henry was morbidly obese and immobile, with a gangrenous leg wound contracted from a jousting accident in 1536. He was also said to have suffered from diabetes, oedema, and organ failure. He was buried at St George's Chapel in Windsor Castle and was succeeded by his only surviving son, Edward VI.

== Early years ==
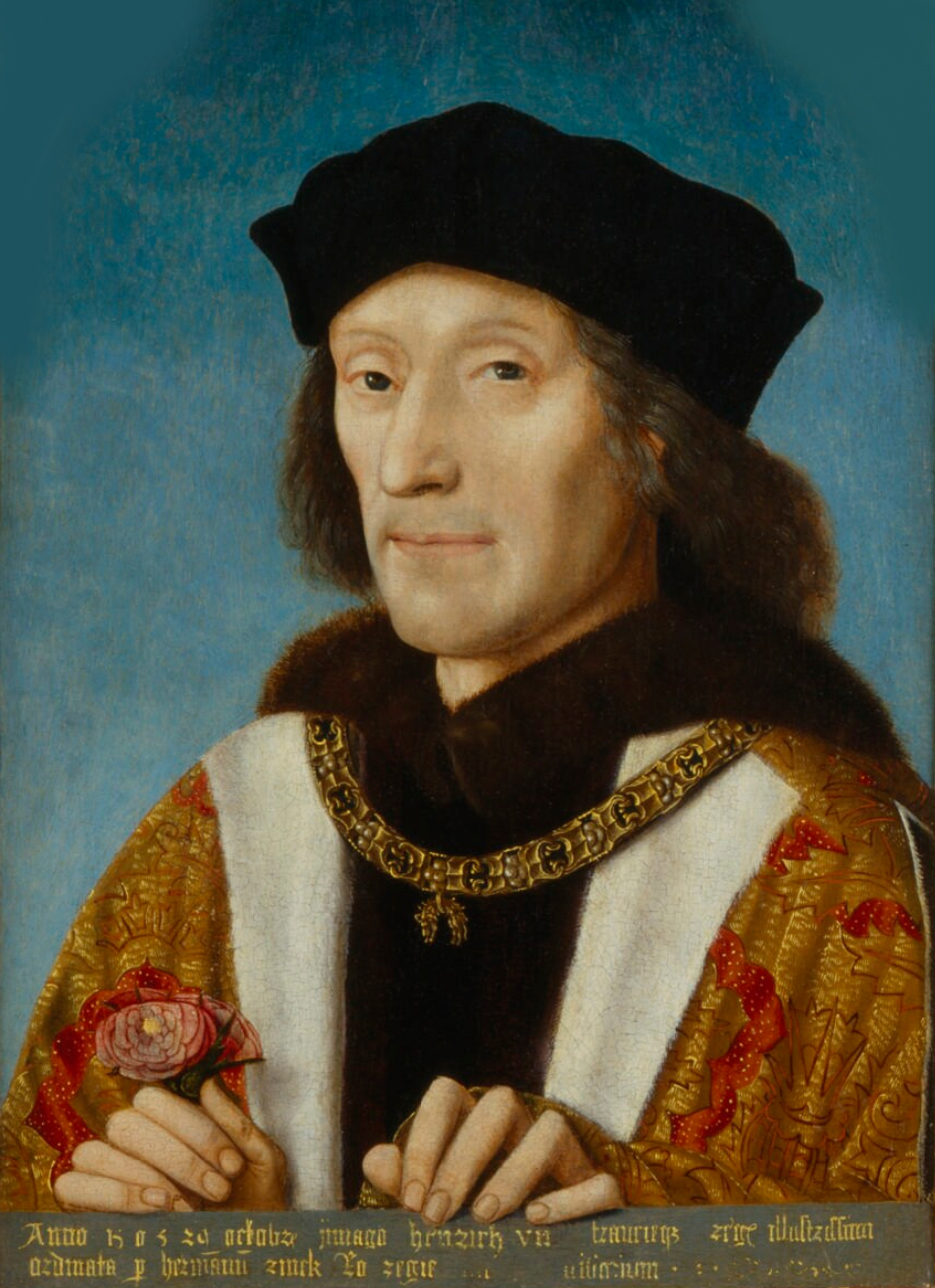
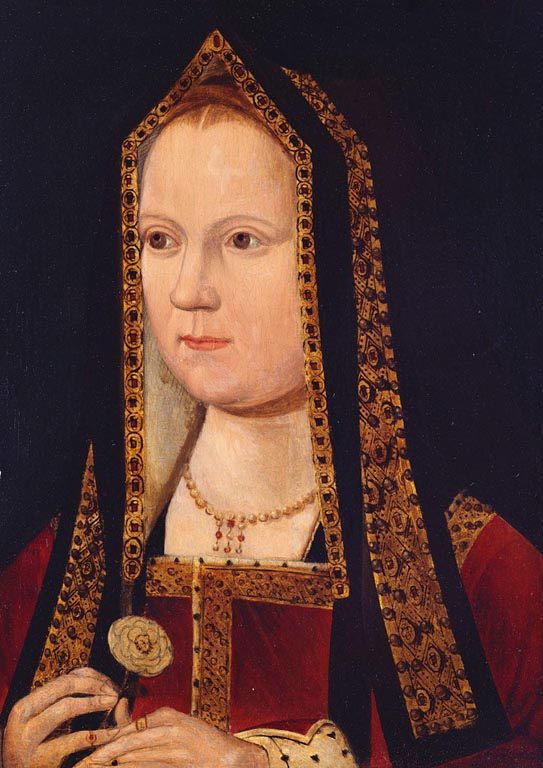
Henry's parents, Henry VII and Elizabeth of York

Henry was born on 28 June 1491 at the Palace of Placentia in Greenwich, Kent, the third child and second son of King Henry VII and Elizabeth of York. Of the young Henry's six (or seven) siblings, only three – his brother Arthur, Prince of Wales, and sisters Margaret and Mary – survived infancy. He was baptised by Richard Foxe, the Bishop of Exeter, at a church of the Observant Franciscans close to the palace. In 1493, at the age of two, Henry was appointed Constable of Dover Castle and Lord Warden of the Cinque Ports. He was subsequently appointed Earl Marshal of England and Lord Lieutenant of Ireland at age three and was made a Knight of the Bath soon after. The day after the ceremony, he was created Duke of York and a month or so later made Warden of the Scottish Marches. In May 1495, he was appointed to the Order of the Garter. The King gave these appointments to his young son to enable himself to retain personal control of lucrative positions and not share them with established families.

As a child, Henry was placed under care of the "Lady Mistress" or royal governess Elizabeth, Lady Darcy and her successor Elizabeth Denton. Not much is known about Henry's early life – save for his appointments – because he was not expected to become king, but it is known that he received a first-rate education from leading tutors. He became fluent in Latin and French and learned at least some Italian.

In November 1501, Henry played a considerable part in the ceremonies surrounding his brother Arthur's marriage to Catherine, the youngest child of King Ferdinand II of Aragon and Queen Isabella I of Castile. As Duke of York, Henry used his father's arms as king, differenced by a label of three points ermine. He was further honoured on 9 February 1506 by Holy Roman Emperor Maximilian I, who made him a Knight of the Golden Fleece.

In 1502, Arthur died at the age of 15, just 20 weeks after his marriage to Catherine of Aragon. Arthur's death thrust all his duties upon his younger brother. Ten-year-old Henry became the new Duke of Cornwall, and the new Prince of Wales and Earl of Chester in February 1504. Henry VII gave his second son few responsibilities, even after the death of Arthur. Young Henry was strictly supervised and did not appear in public. As a result, he ascended the throne "untrained in the exacting art of kingship".

Henry VII renewed his efforts to seal a marital alliance between England and Spain, by offering his son Henry in marriage to the widowed Catherine. Henry VII and Queen Isabella were both keen on the idea, which had arisen very shortly after Arthur's death. On 23 June 1503, a treaty was signed for their marriage, and they were betrothed two days later. A papal dispensation was only needed for the "impediment of public honesty" if the marriage had not been consummated as Catherine and her duenna claimed. Henry VII and the Spanish ambassador instead set out to obtain a dispensation for "affinity", which took account of the possibility of consummation. Cohabitation was not possible because Henry was too young. Isabella's death in 1504, and the ensuing problems of succession in Castile, complicated matters. Ferdinand II preferred Catherine to stay in England, but Henry VII's relations with Ferdinand had deteriorated. Catherine was therefore left in limbo for some time, culminating in Prince Henry's rejection of the marriage as soon he was able, at the age of 14. Ferdinand's solution was to make his daughter ambassador, allowing her to stay in England indefinitely. Devout, she began to believe that it was God's will that she marry Henry despite his opposition.

== Early reign ==
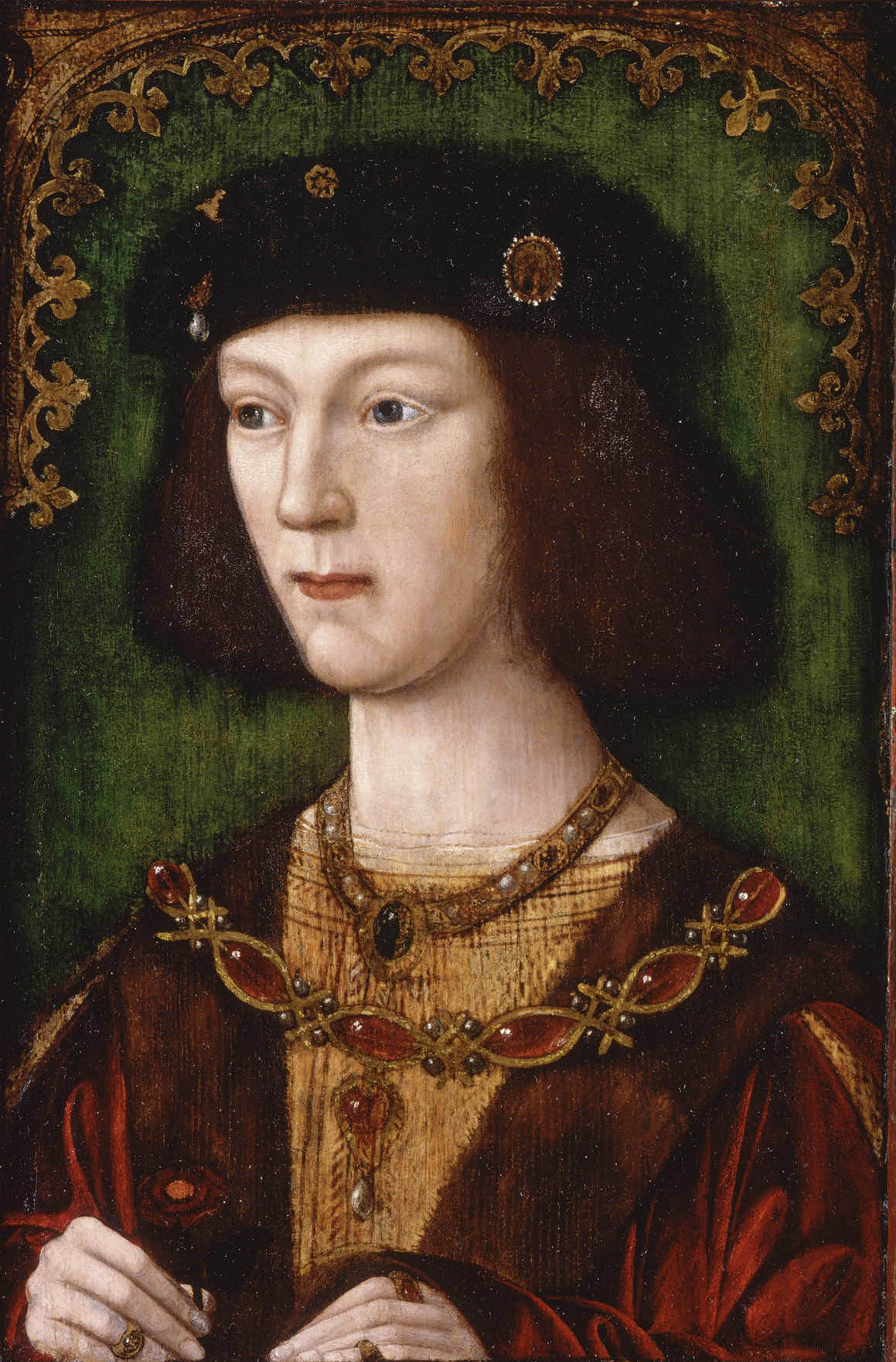
Portrait by Meynnart Wewyck, 1509

Henry VII died in April 1509, and the 17-year-old Henry succeeded him as king. Soon after his father's burial on 10 May, Henry suddenly declared that he would indeed marry Catherine, leaving unresolved several issues concerning the papal dispensation and a missing part of the marriage portion. The new king maintained that it had been his father's dying wish that he marry Catherine. Whether or not this was true, it was convenient. Emperor Maximilian I had been attempting to marry his granddaughter Eleanor, Catherine's niece, to Henry; she had now been jilted. Henry's wedding to Catherine was modest and was held at the friars' church in Greenwich on 11 June 1509. Henry claimed descent from Constantine the Great and King Arthur and saw himself as their successor.

On 23 June 1509, Henry led the now 23-year-old Catherine from the Tower of London to Westminster Abbey for their coronation, which took place the following day. It was a grand affair: the King's passage was lined with tapestries and laid with fine cloth. Following the ceremony, there was a grand banquet in Westminster Hall. As Catherine wrote to her father, "our time is spent in continuous festival".

Two days after his coronation, Henry arrested his father's two most unpopular ministers, Richard Empson and Edmund Dudley. They were charged with high treason and executed in 1510. Politically motivated executions would remain one of Henry's primary tactics for dealing with those who stood in his way. Henry returned some of the money supposedly extorted by the two ministers. By contrast, Henry's view of the House of York – potential rival claimants for the throne – was more moderate than his father's had been. Several who had been imprisoned by his father, including Thomas Grey, 2nd Marquess of Dorset, were pardoned. Others went unreconciled; Edmund de la Pole, 3rd Duke of Suffolk, was eventually beheaded in 1513, an execution prompted by his brother Richard siding against the King.

Soon after marrying Henry, Catherine conceived. She gave birth to a stillborn girl on 31 January 1510. Catherine again became pregnant about four months later, and gave birth to a son, Henry, on 1 January 1511. After the grief of losing their first child, the couple were pleased to have a boy, and festivities were held, including a two-day joust known as the Westminster Tournament. However, the child died seven weeks later. Catherine had two stillborn sons in 1513 and 1515, but gave birth in February 1516 to a girl, Mary. Relations between the King and Queen had been strained, but they eased slightly after Mary's birth.

Although Henry's marriage to Catherine has since been described as "unusually good", it is known that Henry took mistresses. It was revealed in 1510 that Henry had been conducting an affair with one of the sisters of Edward Stafford, 3rd Duke of Buckingham, either Elizabeth or Anne Hastings, Countess of Huntingdon. The most significant mistress for about three years, starting in 1516, was Elizabeth Blount. Blount is one of only two completely undisputed mistresses, considered by some to be few for a virile young king. Exactly how many Henry had is disputed: David Loades believes Henry had mistresses "only to a very limited extent", whilst Alison Weir believes there were numerous other affairs. Catherine is not known to have protested. In 1518, she fell pregnant again with another girl, who was also stillborn.

Blount gave birth in June 1519 to Henry's illegitimate son, Henry FitzRoy. The young boy was made Duke of Richmond in June 1525 in what some thought was one step on the path to his eventual legitimisation. FitzRoy married Mary Howard in 1533, but died childless three years later. At the time of his death in July 1536, Parliament was considering the Second Succession Act, which could have allowed him to become king.

== France and the Habsburgs ==
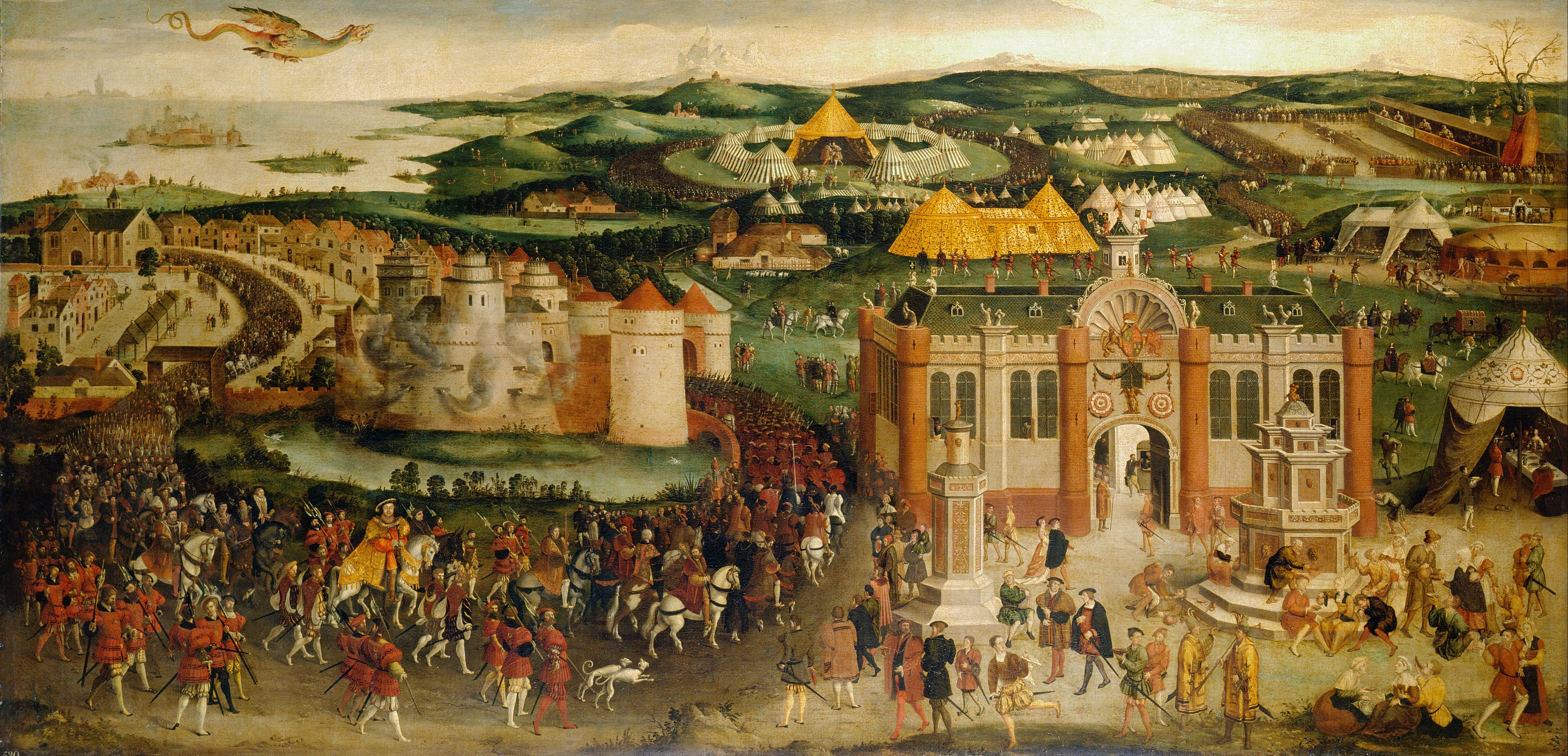
The meeting of Francis I and Henry VIII at the Field of the Cloth of Gold in 1520

In 1510, France, with a fragile alliance with the Holy Roman Empire in the League of Cambrai, was winning a war against Venice. Henry renewed his father's friendship with Louis XII of France, an issue that divided his council. Certainly, war with the combined might of the two powers would have been exceedingly difficult. Shortly thereafter, however, Henry also signed a pact with Ferdinand II of Aragon. After Pope Julius II created the anti-French Holy League in October 1511, Henry followed Ferdinand's lead and brought England into the new League. An initial joint Anglo-Spanish attack was planned for the spring to recover Aquitaine for England, the start of making Henry's dreams of ruling France a reality. The attack, however, following a formal declaration of war in April 1512, was not led by Henry personally and was a considerable failure; Ferdinand used it simply to further his own ends, and it strained the Anglo-Spanish alliance. Nevertheless, the French were pushed out of Italy soon after, and the alliance survived, with both parties keen to win further victories over the French. Henry then pulled off a diplomatic coup by convincing Emperor Maximilian to join the Holy League. Remarkably, Henry had secured the promised title of "Most Christian King of France" from Julius and possibly coronation by the Pope himself in Paris, if only Louis could be defeated.

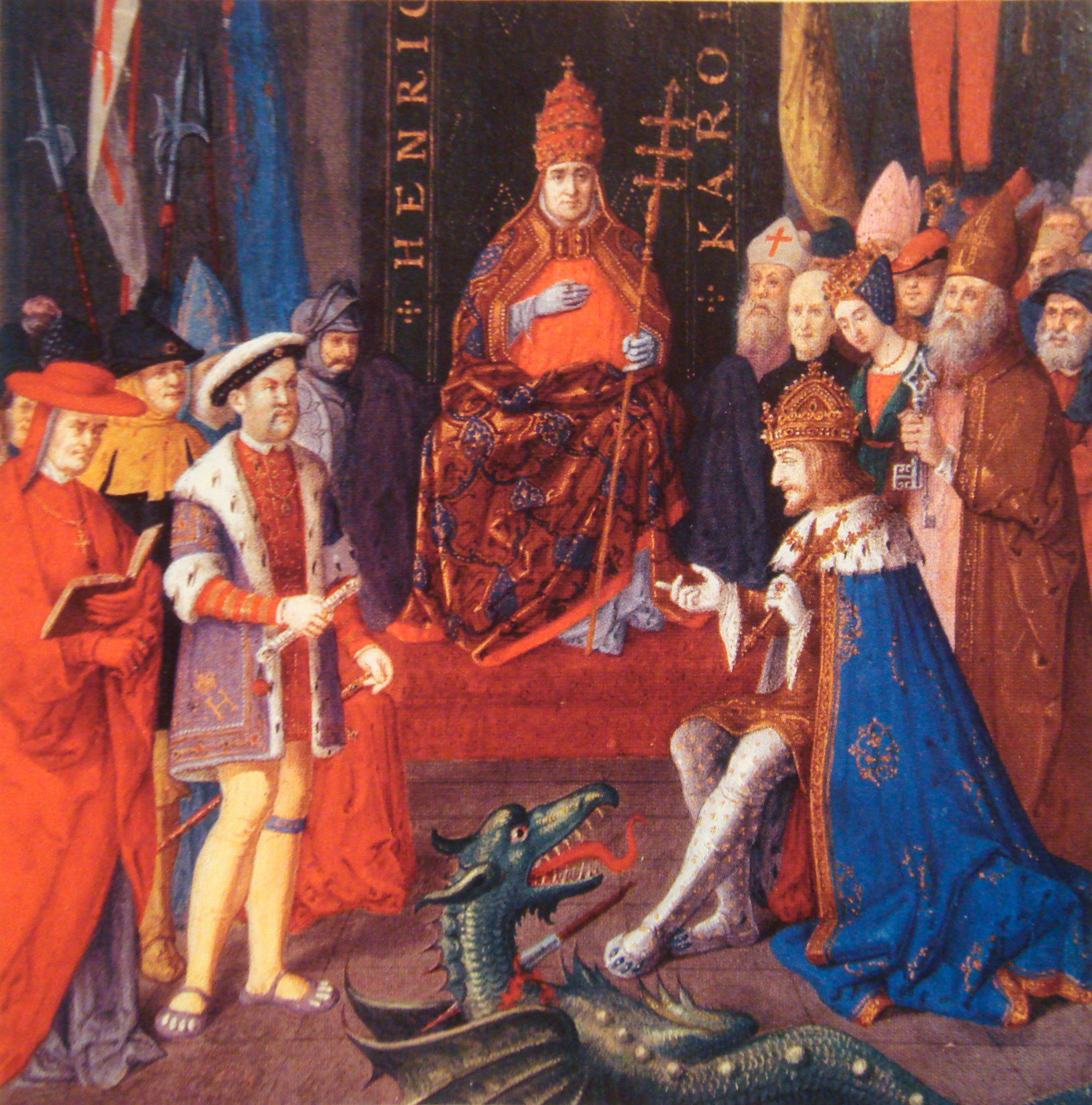
Henry (left) with Pope Leo X (centre) and Emperor Charles V (right); painting by unknown artist c. 1520

On 30 June 1513, Henry invaded France, and his troops defeated a French army at the Battle of the Spurs – a relatively minor result, but one which was seized on by the English for propaganda purposes. Soon after, the English took Thérouanne (handing it over to Maximilian) and Tournai, a more significant settlement, which it kept for five years before handing it back to the French. Henry had led the army personally, complete with a large entourage. His absence from the country, however, had prompted his brother-in-law James IV of Scotland to invade England at the behest of Louis. Nevertheless, the English army, overseen by Queen Catherine, decisively defeated the Scots at the Battle of Flodden on 9 September 1513. Among the dead was the Scottish king, thus ending Scotland's brief involvement in the war. These campaigns had given Henry a taste of the military success he so desired. However, despite initial indications, he decided not to pursue a 1514 campaign. He had been supporting Ferdinand and Maximilian financially during the campaign but had received little in return; England's coffers were now empty. With the replacement of Julius by Pope Leo X, who was inclined to negotiate for peace with France, Henry signed his own treaty with Louis: his sister Mary would become Louis's wife, having previously been pledged to the younger Charles, and peace was secured for eight years, a remarkably long time.

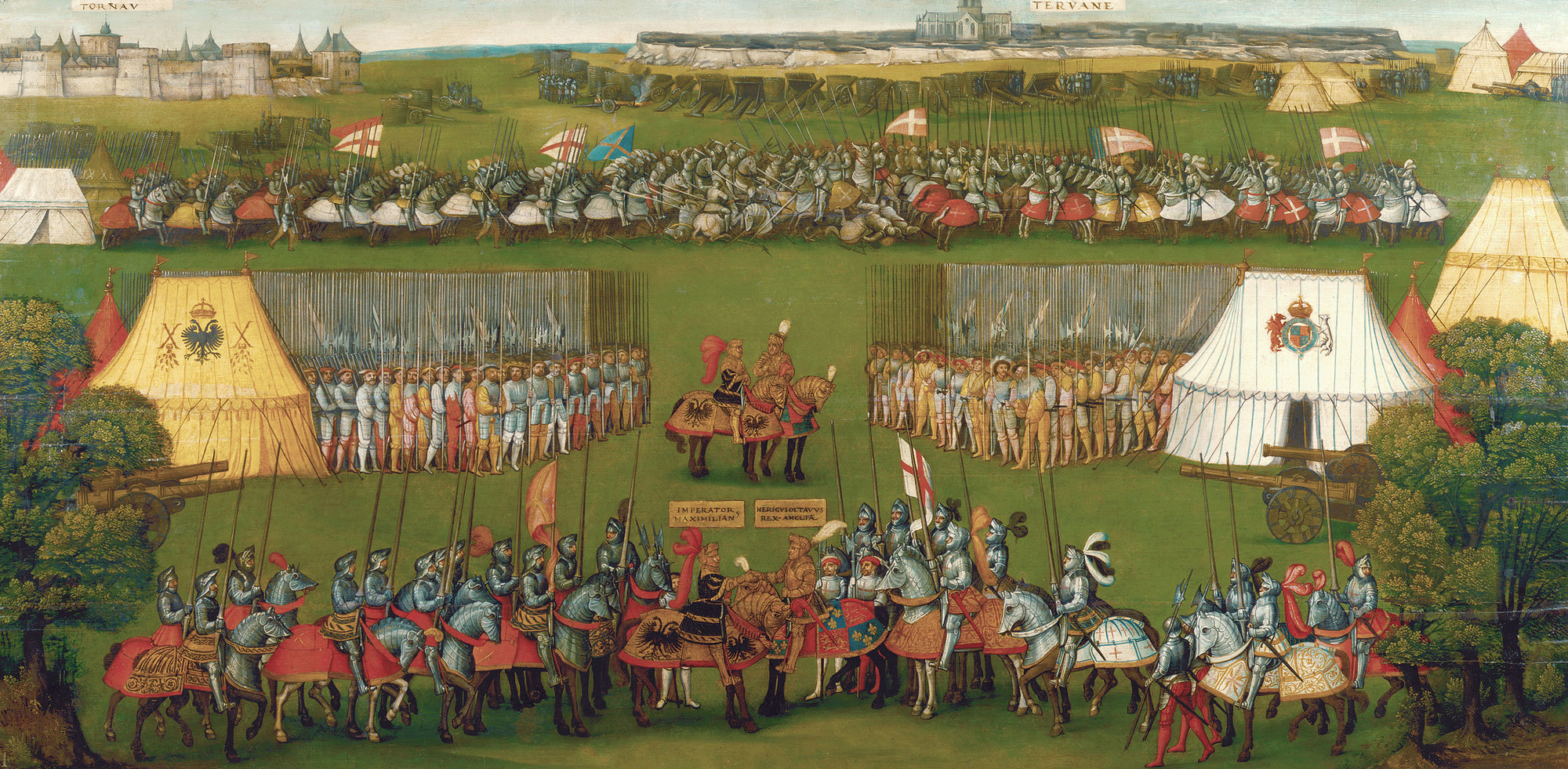
Flemish painting showing the encounter between Henry and Emperor Maximilian I in 1513. In the background is depicted the Battle of the Spurs against Louis XII of France.

Charles V, the nephew of Henry's wife Catherine, inherited a large empire in Europe, becoming king of Spain in 1516 and Holy Roman Emperor in 1519. When Louis XII of France died in 1515, he was succeeded by his cousin Francis I. These accessions left three relatively young rulers and an opportunity for a clean slate. The careful diplomacy of Cardinal Thomas Wolsey had resulted in the Treaty of London (1518), aimed at uniting the kingdoms of western Europe in the wake of a new Ottoman threat, and it seemed that peace might be secured. Henry met King Francis on 7 June 1520 at the Field of the Cloth of Gold near Calais for a fortnight of lavish entertainment. Both hoped for friendly relations in place of the wars of the previous decade. The strong air of competition laid to rest any hopes of a renewal of the Treaty of London, however, and conflict was inevitable. Henry had more in common with Charles, whom he met once before and once after Francis. Charles brought his realms into war with France in 1521; Henry offered to mediate, but little was achieved and by the end of the year Henry had aligned England with Charles. He still clung to his previous aim of restoring English lands in France but sought to secure an alliance with the Netherlands, then a territorial possession of Charles, and the continued support of the Emperor. A small English attack in the north of France made up little ground. Charles defeated and captured Francis at Pavia and could dictate peace, but he believed he owed Henry nothing. Sensing this, Henry decided to take England out of the war before his ally, signing the Treaty of the More on 30 August 1525.

== Marriages ==
Family tree of the wives of Henry VIII

King Henry VIII, both of his parents, and all six of his wives were related through a common ancestor, King Edward I of England. See also: Mistresses of Henry VIII

Edward I 1239–1307; King of England
Margaret b. 1275; Duchess of Brabant	Elizabeth of Rhuddlan c. 1282–1316; Countess of Hereford	Edward II; 1284–1327; King of England
John III; 1300–1355; Duke of Brabant	William de Bohun; 1312–1360; Earl of Northampton	Edward III; 1312–1377; King of England
Margaret of Brabant; 1323–1380; Countess of Flanders	Lionel of Antwerp; 1338–1368; Duke of Clarence	Edmund of Langley; 1341–1402; Duke of York	John of Gaunt; 1340–1399; Duke of Lancaster
Margaret III; 1350–1405; Countess of Flanders	Elizabeth Fitzalan c. 1350–1385; Countess of Arundel	Philippa; 1355–1382; Countess of Ulster
John; 1371–1419; Duke of Burgundy	Elizabeth Fitzalan; 1366–1425; Duchess of Norfolk	Elizabeth Mortimer; 1371–1417	Roger Mortimer; 1374–1398; Earl of March	John Beaufort c. 1371–1410; Earl of Somerset	Catherine; 1373–1418; Queen of Castile	Joan Beaufort c. 1379–1440; Countess of Westmorland
Mary; 1393–1466; Duchess of Cleves	Margaret de Mowbray b. 1388	Elizabeth c. 1395–1436; Baroness de Clifford	Anne de Mortimer; 1388–c. 1411	Richard of Conisburgh; 1385–1415; Earl of Cambridge	John Beaufort; 1404–1444; Duke of Somerset	John II; 1405–1454; King of Castile	Richard Neville; 1400–1460; Earl of Salisbury
John I 1419–1481; Duke of Cleves	John Howard c. 1425–1485; Duke of Norfolk	Mary Clifford	Richard; 1411–1460; Duke of York	Alice Neville b. c. 1430; Baroness FitzHugh
John II; 1458–1521; Duke of Cleves	Thomas Howard; 1443–1524; Duke of Norfolk	Henry Wentworth c. 1448–1499/1501	Edward IV; 1442–1483; King of England	Margaret Beaufort; 1441/43–1509	Isabella I 1451–1504; Queen of Castile	Elizabeth FitzHugh c. 1455/1465–bef. 1507
John III; 1490–1538/1539; Duke of Cleves	Edmund Howard c. 1478–1539	Elizabeth Boleyn c. 1480–1538; Countess of Wiltshire	Margery Wentworth c. 1478–1550	Elizabeth of York; 1466–1503	Henry VII; 1457–1509; King of England	Thomas Parr c. 1483–1517
Anne of Cleves; 1515–1557; 4th wife: 1540	Catherine Howard c. 1524–1542; 5th wife: 1540–1542	Anne Boleyn c. 1507–1536; 2nd wife: 1533–1536	Jane Seymour c. 1508–1537; 3rd wife: 1536–1537	Henry VIII; 1491–1547; King of England	Catherine of Aragon; 1485–1536; 1st wife: 1509–1533	Catherine Parr; 1512–1548; 6th wife: 1543–1547
Elizabeth I 1533–1603; Queen of England	Edward VI; 1537–1553; King of England	Mary I 1516–1558; Queen of England

=== Annulment from Catherine ===
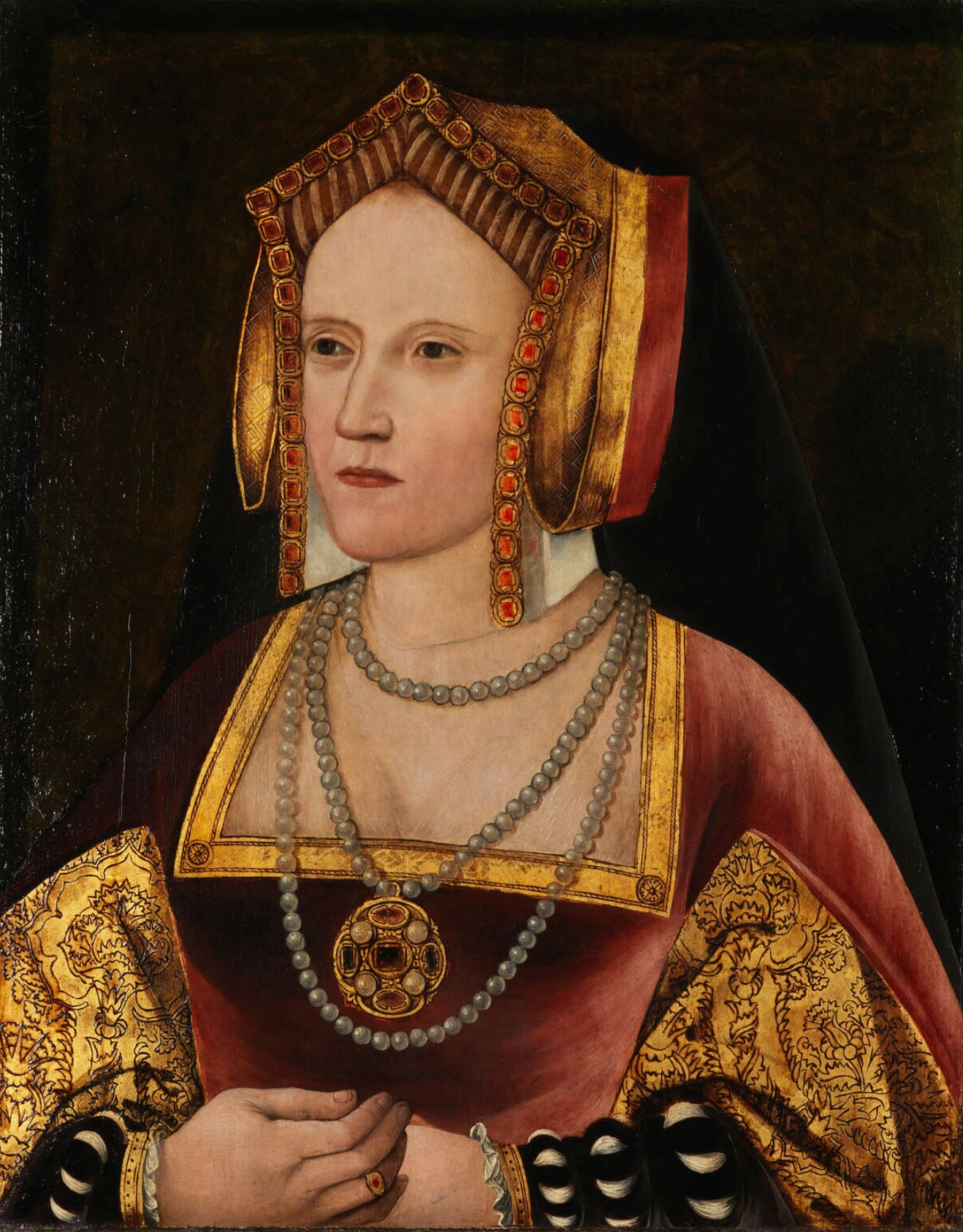
Catherine of Aragon, Henry's first queen, c. 1520

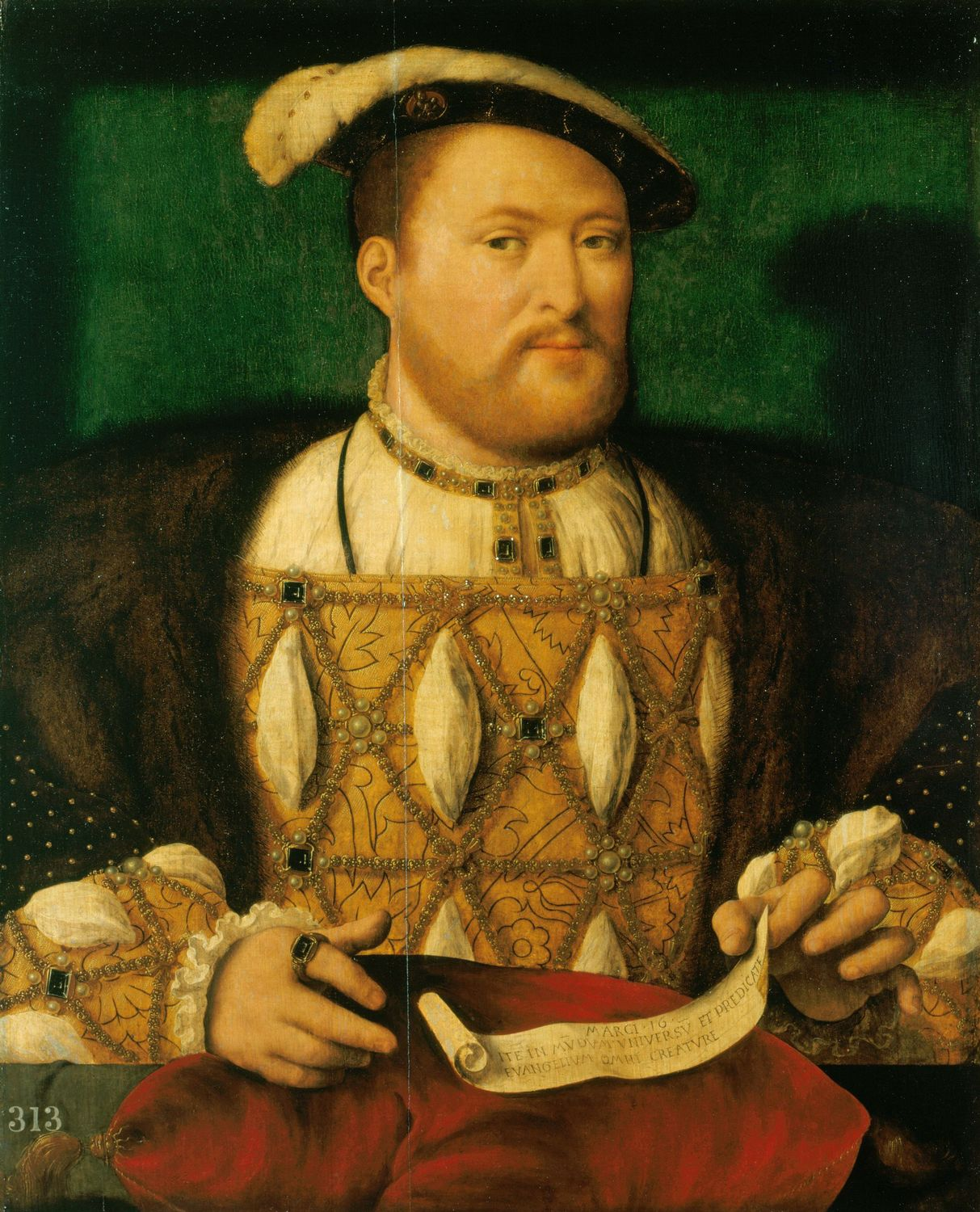
Portrait of Henry VIII by Joos van Cleve, c. 1531

During his marriage to Catherine of Aragon, Henry conducted an affair with her lady-in-waiting Mary Boleyn. There has been speculation that he fathered Mary's two children, Henry and Catherine Carey, but this has never been proven. The King never acknowledged them as he did Henry FitzRoy. In 1525, as Henry grew more impatient with Catherine's inability to produce the male heir he desired, he became enamoured with Mary Boleyn's sister, Anne Boleyn, then a charismatic young woman in the Queen's entourage. Anne, however, resisted his attempts to seduce her, and refused to become his mistress as her sister had. (Note: For arguments in favour of the contrasting view – i.e. that Henry himself initiated the period of abstinence, potentially after a brief affair – see Bernard, G. W. (2010). Anne Boleyn: Fatal Attractions. Yale University Press. ISBN 978-0-3001-6245-5..) It was in this context that Henry considered his three options for finding a dynastic successor and hence resolving what came to be described at court as the King's "great matter". These options were legitimising Henry FitzRoy, which would need the involvement of the Pope and would be open to challenge; marrying off his daughter Mary as soon as possible and hoping for a grandson to inherit directly, though Mary was considered unlikely to conceive before Henry's death; or somehow rejecting Catherine and marrying someone else of child-bearing age. Probably seeing the possibility of marrying Anne, the third was ultimately the most attractive possibility to the 34-year-old Henry, and it soon became the King's absorbing desire to annul his marriage to the now 40-year-old Catherine.

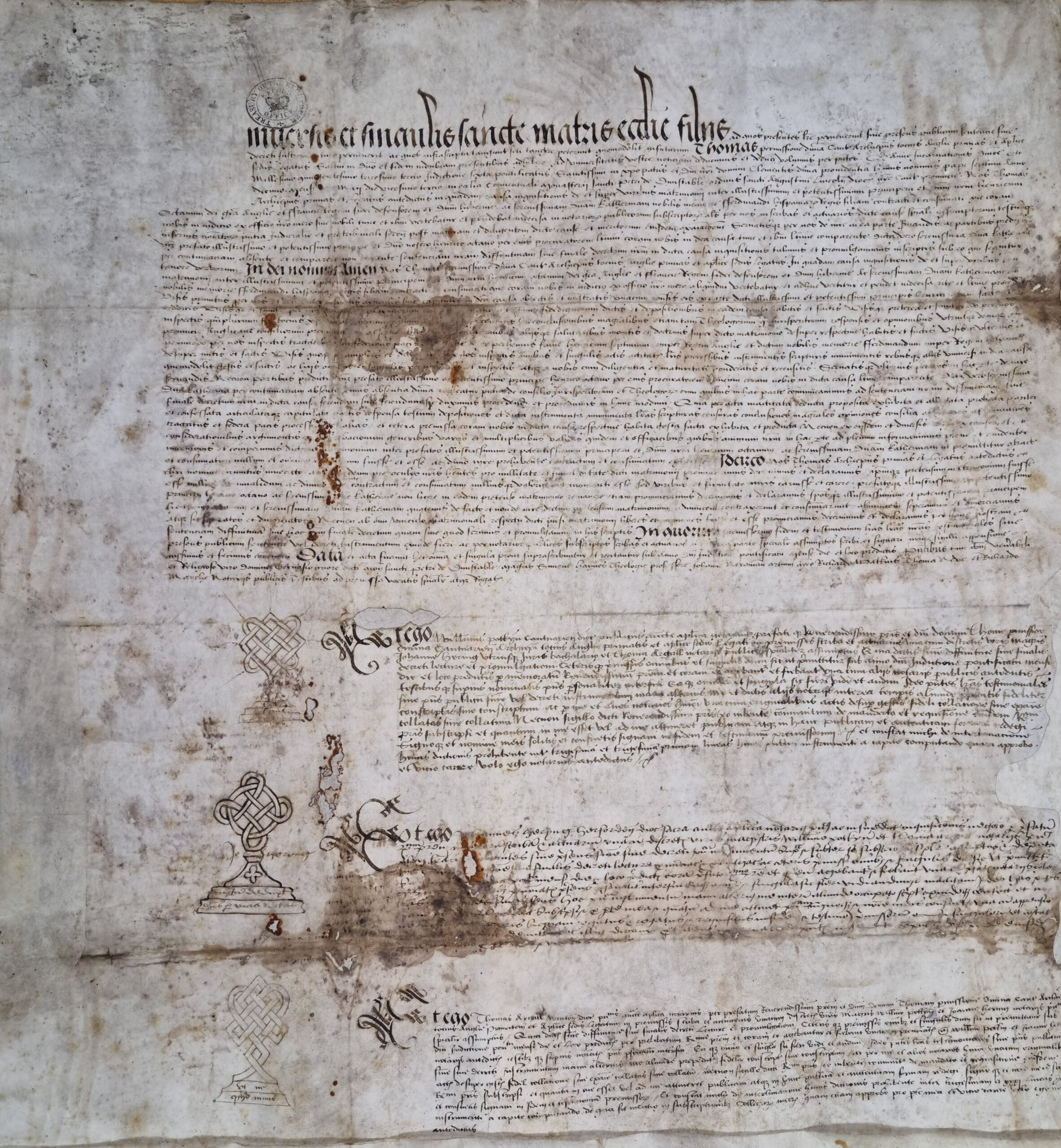
The annulment verdict given by Thomas Cranmer, 1533

Henry's precise motivations and intentions over the coming years are not widely agreed on. Henry himself, at least in the early part of his reign, was a devout and well-informed Catholic to the extent that his 1521 publication Assertio Septem Sacramentorum ("Defence of the Seven Sacraments") earned him the title of Fidei Defensor (Defender of the Faith) from Pope Leo X. The work represented a staunch defence of papal supremacy, albeit one couched in somewhat contingent terms. It is not clear exactly when Henry changed his mind on the issue as he grew more intent on a second marriage. Certainly, by 1527, he had convinced himself that Catherine had produced no male heir because their union was "blighted in the eyes of God". Indeed, in marrying Catherine, his brother's wife, he had acted contrary to Leviticus 20:21, a justification Thomas Cranmer used to declare the marriage null. (Note: "And if a man shall take his brother's wife, it is an unclean thing: he hath uncovered his brother's nakedness; they shall be childless.") Martin Luther, on the other hand, had initially argued against the annulment, stating that Henry could take a second wife in accordance with his teaching that the Bible allowed for polygamy but not divorce. Henry now believed the Pope had lacked the authority to grant a dispensation from this impediment. It was this argument Henry took to Pope Clement VII in 1527 in the hope of having his marriage to Catherine annulled, forgoing at least one less openly defiant line of attack. In going public, all hope of tempting Catherine to retire to a nunnery or otherwise stay quiet was lost. Henry sent his secretary, William Knight, to appeal directly to the Holy See by way of a deceptively worded draft papal bull. Knight was unsuccessful; the Pope could not be misled so easily.

Other missions concentrated on arranging an ecclesiastical court to meet in England, with a representative from Clement VII. Although Clement agreed to the creation of such a court, he never had any intention of empowering his legate, Lorenzo Campeggio, to decide in Henry's favour. This bias was perhaps the result of pressure from Emperor Charles V, but it is not clear how far this influenced either Campeggio or the Pope. After less than two months of hearing evidence, Clement called the case back to Rome in July 1529, from which it was clear that it would never re-emerge. With the chance for an annulment lost, Cardinal Wolsey bore the blame. He was charged with praemunire in October 1529, and his fall from grace was "sudden and total". Briefly reconciled with Henry (and officially pardoned) in the first half of 1530, he was charged once more in November 1530, this time for treason, but died while awaiting trial. After a short period in which Henry took government upon his own shoulders, Thomas More took on the role of Lord Chancellor and chief minister. Intelligent and able, but a devout Catholic and opponent of the annulment, More initially cooperated with the King's new policy, denouncing Wolsey in Parliament.

A year later, Catherine was banished from court, and her rooms were given to Anne Boleyn. Anne was an unusually educated and intellectual woman for her time and was keenly absorbed and engaged with the ideas of the Protestant Reformers, but the extent to which she herself was a committed Protestant is much debated. When Archbishop of Canterbury William Warham died, Anne's influence led Henry to appoint Thomas Cranmer, a trustworthy supporter of the annulment, to the vacant position. This was approved by the Pope, unaware of the King's nascent plans for the Church.

=== Marriage to Anne Boleyn ===
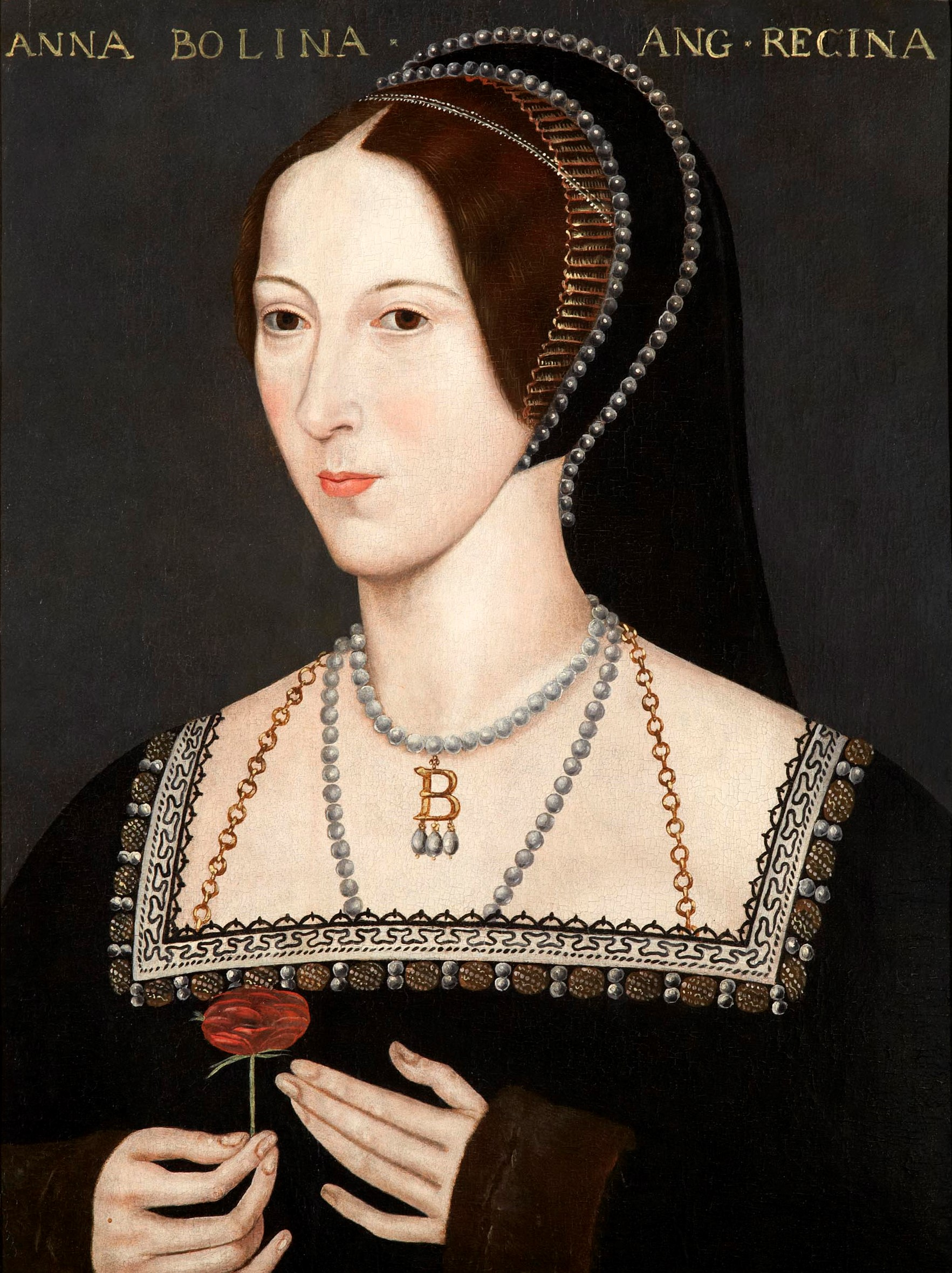
Portrait of Anne Boleyn, Henry's second queen; a copy of a lost original painted around 1534

In the winter of 1532, Henry met with Francis I at Calais and enlisted Francis's support for his new marriage. Immediately upon returning to Dover in England, Henry, now 41, and Anne went through a secret wedding service. She soon became pregnant, and there was a second wedding service in London on 25 January 1533. On 23 May 1533, Cranmer, sitting in judgment at a special court convened at Dunstable Priory to rule on the validity of the King's marriage to Catherine of Aragon, declared the marriage of Henry and Catherine null and void. Five days later, on 28 May 1533, Cranmer declared the marriage of Henry and Anne to be valid. Catherine was formally stripped of her title as queen, becoming instead "princess dowager" as the widow of Arthur. In her place, Anne was crowned queen on 1 June 1533. The Queen gave birth to a daughter slightly prematurely on 7 September 1533. The child was christened Elizabeth, in honour of Henry's mother, Elizabeth of York.

Following the marriage, there was a period of consolidation, taking the form of a series of statutes of the Reformation Parliament aimed at finding solutions to any remaining issues, whilst protecting the new reforms from challenge, convincing the public of their legitimacy, and exposing and dealing with opponents. Although the canon law was dealt with at length by Cranmer and others, these acts were advanced by Thomas Cromwell, Thomas Audley and Thomas Howard, 3rd Duke of Norfolk and indeed by Henry himself. With this process complete, in May 1532 More resigned as Lord Chancellor, leaving Cromwell as Henry's chief minister. With the Act of Succession 1533, Catherine's daughter, Mary, was declared illegitimate; Henry's marriage to Anne was declared legitimate; and Anne's issue declared to be next in the line of succession. With the Acts of Supremacy in 1534, Parliament recognised the King's status as head of the church in England and, together with the Act in Restraint of Appeals in 1532, abolished the right of appeal to Rome. It was only then that Pope Clement VII took the step of excommunicating the King and Cranmer, although the excommunication was not made official until some time later. (Note: On 11 July 1533 Pope Clement VII 'pronounced sentence against the King, declaring him excommunicated unless he put away the woman he had taken to wife, and took back his Queen during the whole of October next.' Clement died on 25 September 1534. On 30 August 1535 the new pope, Paul III, drew up a bull of excommunication which began 'Eius qui immobilis'. G. R. Elton puts the date the bull was made official as November 1538. On 17 December 1538 Pope Paul III issued a further bull which began 'Cum redemptor noster', renewing the execution of the bull of 30 August 1535, which had been suspended in hope of his amendment. Both bulls are printed by Bishop Burnet, History of the Reformation of the Church of England, 1865 edition, Volume 4, pp. 318ff and in Bullarum, diplomatum et privilegiorum sanctorum Romanorum pontificum Taurinensis (1857) Volume VI, p. 195)

The King and Queen were not pleased with married life. They enjoyed periods of calm and affection, but Anne refused to play the submissive role expected of her. The vivacity and opinionated intellect that had made her so attractive as an illicit lover made her too independent for the largely ceremonial role of a royal wife and it made her many enemies. For his part, Henry disliked Anne's constant irritability and violent temper. After a false pregnancy or miscarriage in 1534, he saw her failure to give him a son as a betrayal. As early as Christmas 1534, Henry was discussing with Cranmer and Cromwell the chances of leaving Anne without having to return to Catherine. Henry is traditionally believed to have had an affair with Madge Shelton in 1535, although historian Antonia Fraser argues that Henry in fact had an affair with her sister Mary Shelton.

Opposition to Henry's religious policies was at first quickly suppressed in England. Some dissenting monks, including the first Carthusian Martyrs, were executed and many more pilloried. The most prominent resisters included John Fisher, Bishop of Rochester, and Thomas More, both of whom refused to take the Oath of Supremacy to the King. Neither Henry nor Cromwell sought at that stage to have the men executed; rather, they hoped that the two might change their minds and save themselves. Fisher openly rejected Henry as the Supreme Head of the Church, but More was careful to avoid openly breaking the Treasons Act 1534, which (unlike later acts) did not forbid mere silence. Both men were subsequently convicted of high treason, however – More on the evidence of a single conversation with Richard Rich, the Solicitor General – and both were executed in the summer of 1535.

These suppressions, as well as the Suppression of Religious Houses Act 1535, in turn, contributed to a more general resistance to Henry's reforms, most notably in the Pilgrimage of Grace, a large uprising in northern England in October 1536. Some 20,000 to 40,000 rebels were led by Robert Aske, together with parts of the northern nobility. Henry VIII promised the rebels he would pardon them and thanked them for raising the issues. Aske told the rebels they had been successful and they could disperse and go home. Henry saw the rebels as traitors and did not feel obliged to keep his promises to them, so when further violence occurred after Henry's offer of a pardon he was quick to break his promise of clemency. The leaders, including Aske, were arrested and executed for treason. In total, about 200 rebels were executed, and the disturbances ended.

==== Execution of Anne Boleyn ====
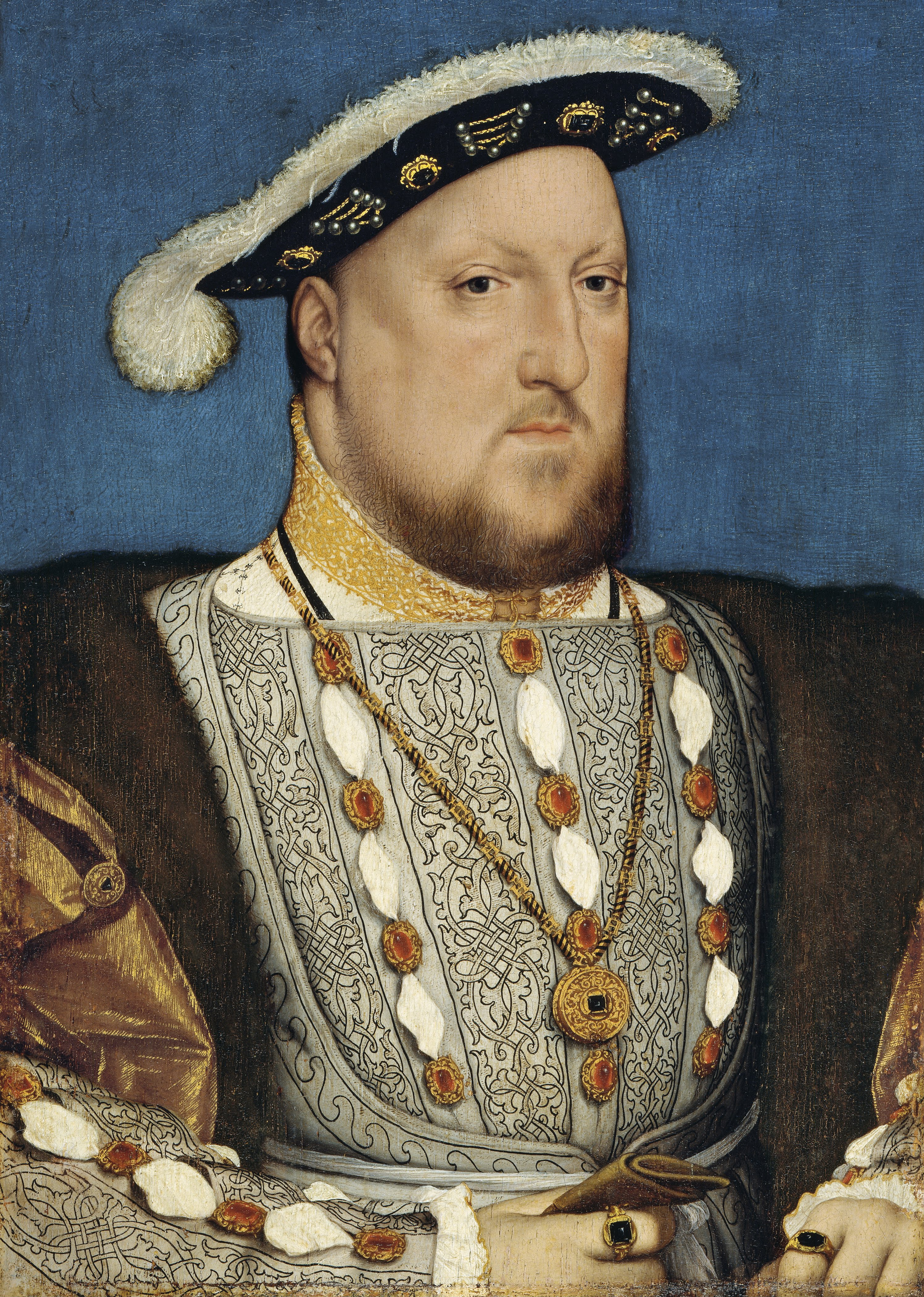
Portrait by Hans Holbein the Younger, c. 1537

On 8 January 1536, news reached the King and Queen that Catherine of Aragon had died. The following day, Henry dressed all in yellow, with a white feather in his bonnet. Queen Anne was pregnant again, and she was aware that there might be consequences if she failed to give birth to a son. Later that month, the King was thrown from his horse in a tournament and was badly injured; it seemed for a time that his life was in danger. When news of this accident reached the Queen, she was sent into shock and miscarried a male child at about 15 weeks' gestation, on the day of Catherine's funeral, 29 January 1536. For most observers, this personal loss was the beginning of the end of this royal marriage.

Although the Boleyn family still held important positions on the Privy Council, Anne had many enemies, including Charles Brandon, 1st Duke of Suffolk. Even her own uncle, the Duke of Norfolk, had come to resent her attitude to her power. The Boleyns preferred France over the Emperor as a potential ally, but the King's favour had swung towards the latter (partly because of Cromwell), damaging the family's influence. Also opposed to Anne were supporters of reconciliation with Princess Mary (among them the former supporters of Catherine), who had reached maturity. A second annulment was now a real possibility, although it is commonly believed that it was Cromwell's anti-Boleyn influence that led opponents to look for a way of having her executed.

Anne's downfall came shortly after she had recovered from her final miscarriage. Whether it was primarily the result of allegations of conspiracy, adultery, or witchcraft remains a matter of debate among historians. Early signs of a fall from grace included the King's new mistress, the 28-year-old Jane Seymour, being moved into new quarters, and Anne's brother, George Boleyn, being refused the Order of the Garter, which was instead given to Nicholas Carew. Between 30 April and 2 May, five men, including George Boleyn, were arrested on charges of treasonable adultery and accused of having sexual relationships with the Queen. Anne was arrested, accused of treasonous adultery and incest. Although the evidence against them was unconvincing, the accused were found guilty and condemned to death. On 17 May 1536, Henry and Anne's marriage was annulled by Archbishop Cranmer at Lambeth Palace and the accused men were executed. Cranmer appears to have had difficulty finding grounds for an annulment and probably based it on the prior liaison between Henry and Anne's sister Mary, which in canon law meant that Henry's marriage to Anne was, like his first marriage, within a forbidden degree of affinity and therefore void. At 8 am on 19 May 1536, Anne was executed on Tower Green.

=== Marriage to Jane Seymour; domestic and foreign affairs ===
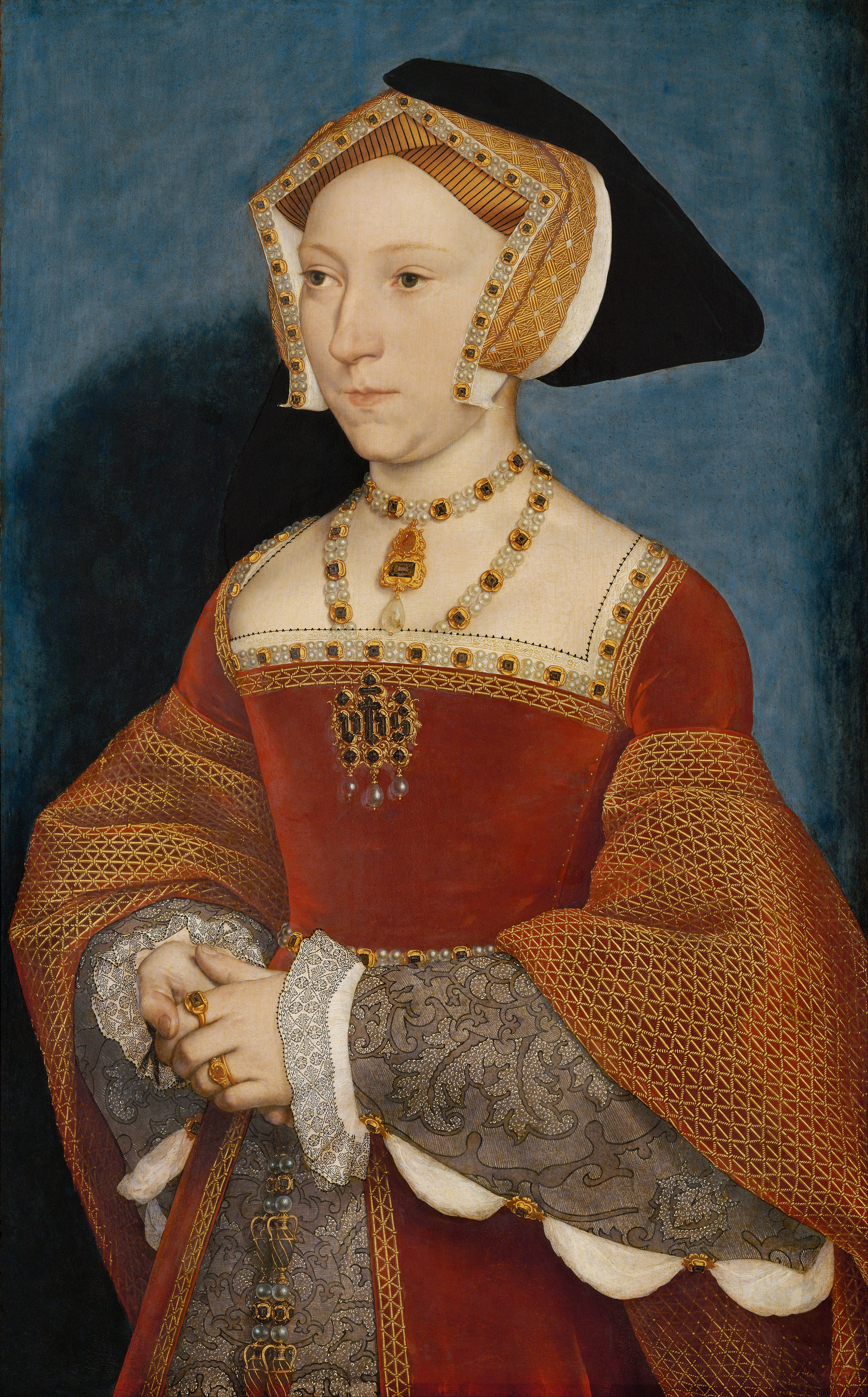
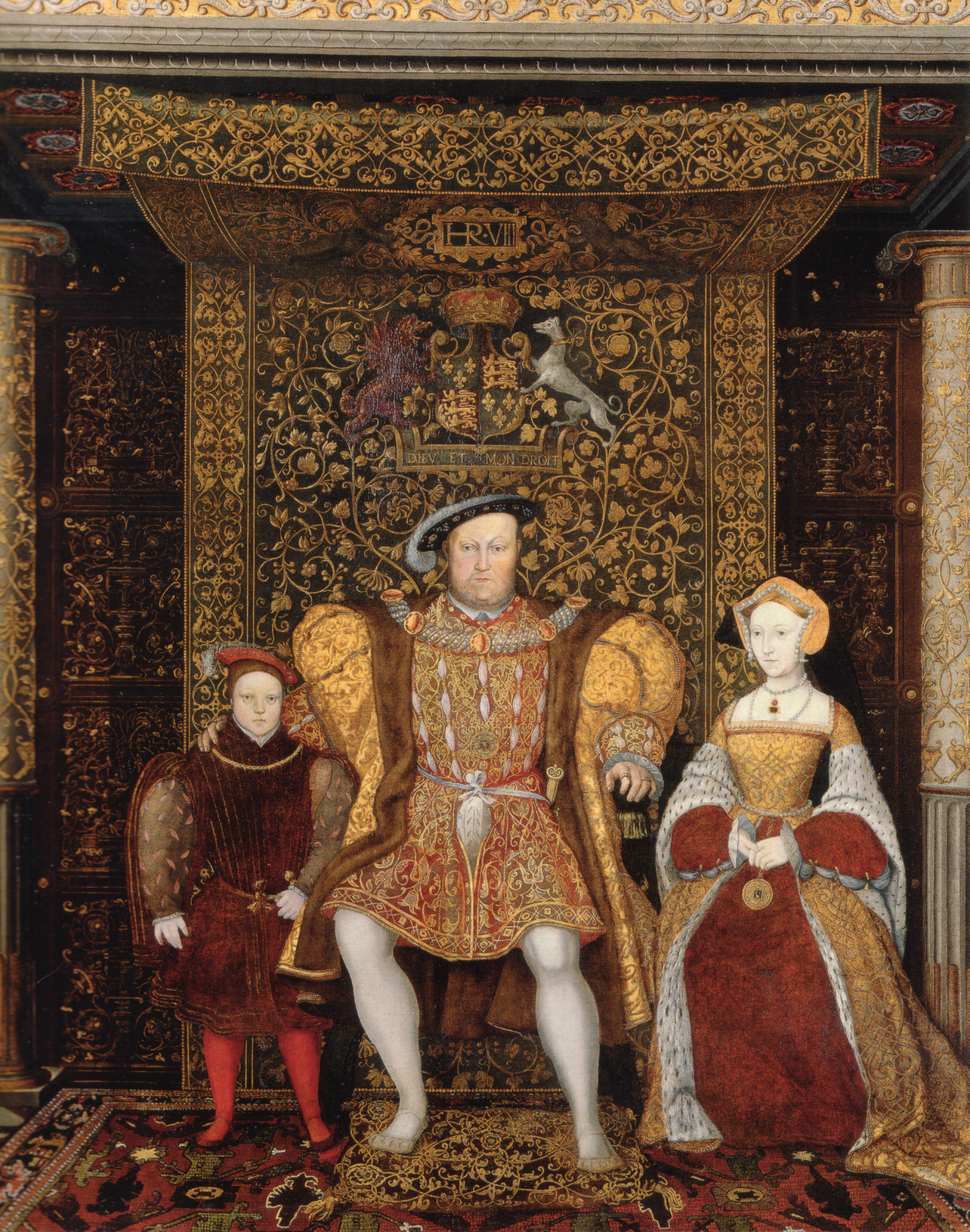
Jane Seymour (left) was Henry's third wife. She is pictured (right) with Henry and the young Prince Edward in a painting by an unknown artist; by the time this painting was completed, c. 1545, Henry was already married to his sixth wife, Catherine Parr.

The day after Anne's execution, the 45-year-old Henry became engaged to Seymour, who had been one of the Queen's ladies-in-waiting. They were married ten days later at the Palace of Whitehall, London, in Anne's closet, by Stephen Gardiner, Bishop of Winchester.

With Charles V distracted by the internal politics of his many kingdoms and external threats, and Henry and Francis on relatively good terms, domestic and not foreign policy issues had been Henry's priority in the first half of the 1530s. In 1536, for example, Henry granted his assent to the Laws in Wales Act 1535, which legally annexed Wales, uniting England and Wales into a single nation. This was followed by the Second Succession Act (the Succession to the Crown Act 1536), which declared Henry's children by Jane to be next in the line of succession and declared both Mary and Elizabeth illegitimate, thus excluding them from the throne. The King was granted the power to further determine the line of succession in his will, should he have no further issue.

On 12 October 1537, Jane gave birth to a son, Prince Edward, the future Edward VI. The birth was difficult, and Queen Jane died on 24 October 1537 from an infection and was buried in Windsor. The euphoria that had accompanied Edward's birth became sorrow, but it was only over time that Henry came to long for his wife. At the time, Henry recovered quickly from the shock. Measures were immediately put in place to find another wife for Henry, which, at the insistence of Cromwell and the Privy Council, were focused on the European continent.

In 1538, as part of the negotiation of a secret treaty by Cromwell with Charles V, a series of dynastic marriages were proposed: Mary would marry a son of King John III of Portugal, Elizabeth would marry one of the sons of King Ferdinand I of Hungary and the infant Edward would marry one of Charles's daughters. It was suggested the widowed Henry might marry Christina of Denmark, Dowager Duchess of Milan. However, when Charles and Francis made peace in January 1539, Henry became increasingly paranoid, perhaps as a result of receiving a constant list of threats to the kingdom (real or imaginary, minor or serious) supplied by Cromwell in his role as spymaster. Enriched by the dissolution of the monasteries, Henry used some of his financial reserves to build a series of coastal defences and set some aside for use in the event of a Franco-German invasion.

=== Marriage to Anne of Cleves ===
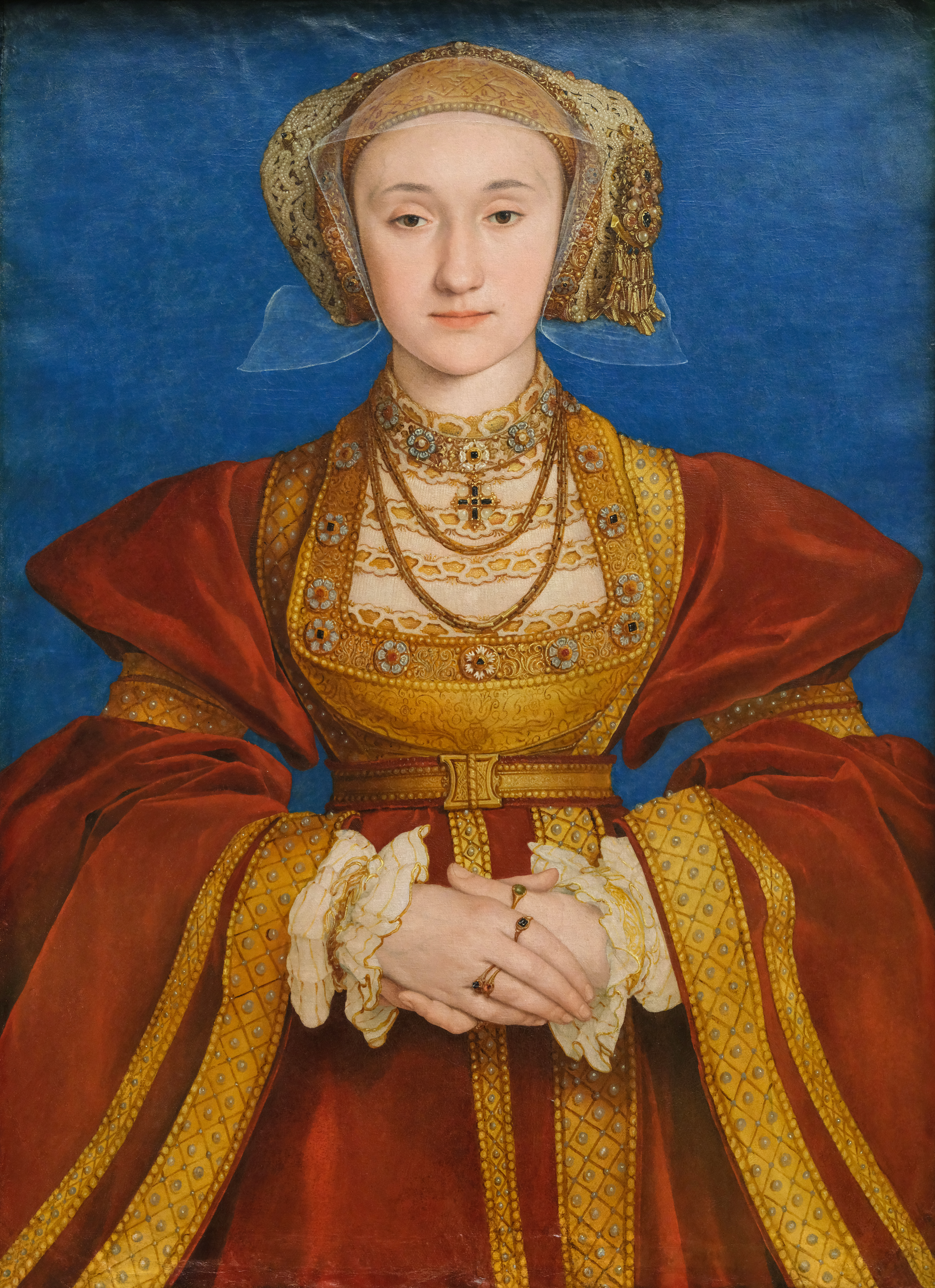
Portrait of Anne of Cleves by Hans Holbein the Younger, 1539

Having considered the matter, Cromwell suggested Anne, the 25-year-old sister of William, Duke of Jülich-Cleves-Berg, who was seen as an important ally in case of a Roman Catholic attack on England, for the Duke fell between Lutheranism and Catholicism. Other potential brides included Christina of Denmark, Anna of Lorraine, Louise of Guise and Amalia of Cleves. Hans Holbein the Younger was dispatched to Cleves to paint a portrait of Anne for the King. Despite speculation that Holbein painted her in an overly flattering light, it is more likely that the portrait was accurate; Holbein remained in favour at court. After seeing Holbein's portrait, and urged on by the complimentary description of Anne given by his courtiers, the 49-year-old King agreed to wed Anne.

When Henry met Anne, however, he was much displeased with her appearance. The King was reportedly taken aback and told his courtiers "I promise you, I see no such thing as hath been shown me of her, by pictures and report. I am ashamed that men have praised her as they have done, and I love her not!" Despite his protests, Henry knew that the situation was too far gone and he would have to wed his bride.

The marriage took place in January 1540, but it was never consummated. The morning after their wedding night, Henry complained about his new wife to Cromwell, stating:

Surely, my lord, I liked her before not well, but now I like her much worse! She is nothing fair, and have very evil smells about her. I took her to be no maid by reason of the closeness of her breasts and other tokens, which, when I felt them, strake me so to the heart, that I had neither will nor courage to prove the rest. I can have none appetite for displeasant airs. I have left her as good a maid as I found her.

Henry wished to annul the marriage as soon as possible so he could marry another. Anne did not argue, and confirmed that the marriage had never been consummated. Anne's previous betrothal to Francis of Lorraine provided further grounds for the annulment. The marriage was subsequently dissolved in July 1540, and Anne received the title of "The King's Sister", two houses, and a generous allowance.

=== Marriage to Catherine Howard (and fall of Thomas Cromwell) ===
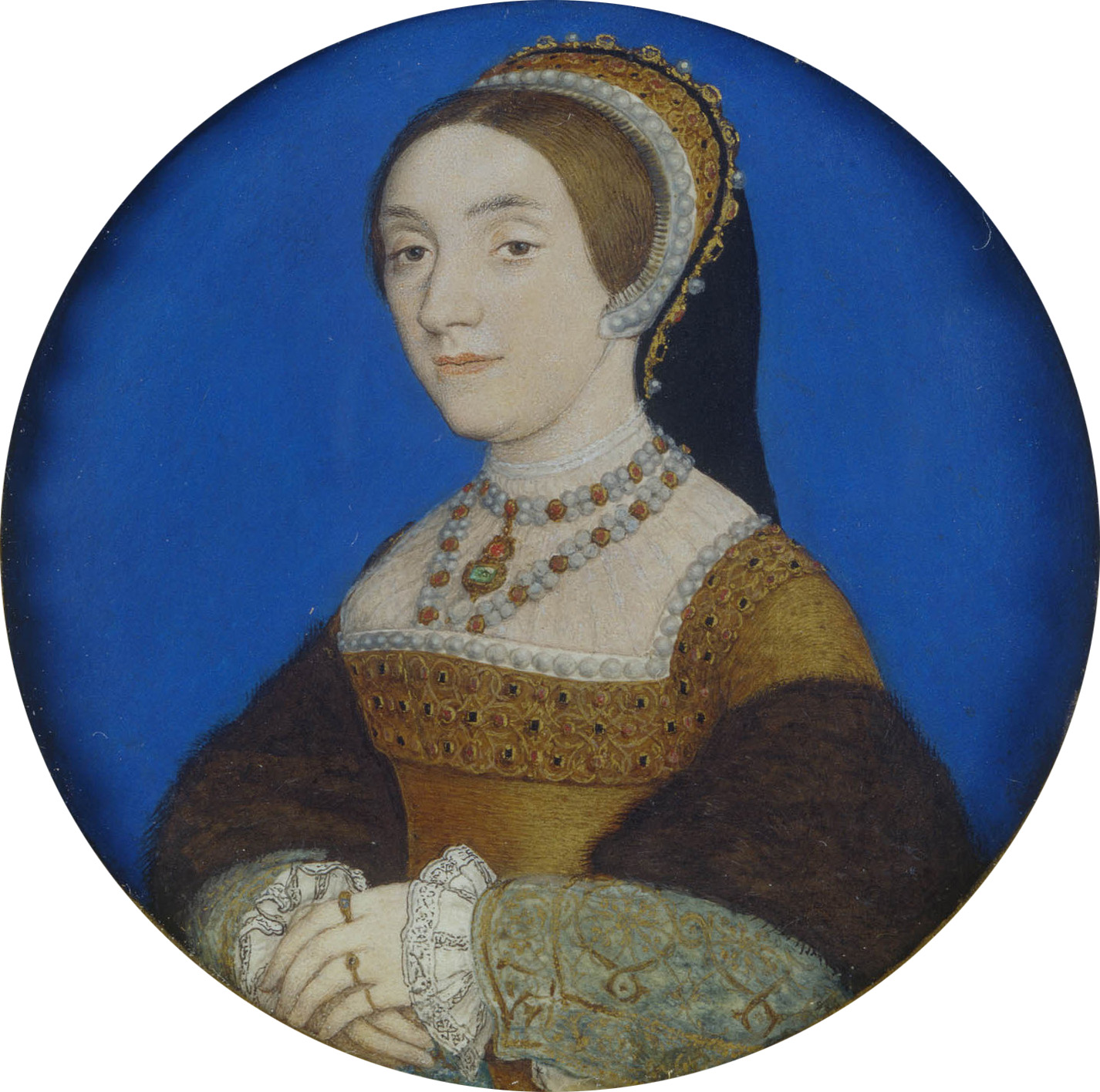
Portrait of a woman believed to be Catherine Howard, Henry's fifth wife, by Hans Holbein the Younger, 1540

It was soon clear that Henry had fallen for the 17-year-old Catherine Howard, the Duke of Norfolk's niece. This worried Cromwell, for Norfolk was his political opponent.

Shortly after, the religious reformers (and protégés of Cromwell) Robert Barnes, William Jerome and Thomas Garret were burned as heretics. Cromwell, meanwhile, fell out of favour although it is unclear exactly why, for there is little evidence of differences in domestic or foreign policy. Despite his role, he was never formally accused of being responsible for Henry's failed marriage. Cromwell was now surrounded by enemies at court, with Norfolk also able to draw on his niece Catherine's position. Cromwell was charged with treason, selling export licences, granting passports, and drawing up commissions without permission, and may also have been blamed for the failure of the foreign policy that accompanied the attempted marriage to Anne. He was subsequently attainted and beheaded.

On 28 July 1540 (the same day Cromwell was executed), Henry married the young Catherine Howard, a first cousin and lady-in-waiting of Anne Boleyn. He was delighted with his new queen and awarded her the lands of Cromwell and a vast array of jewellery. Soon after the marriage, however, Queen Catherine had an affair with the courtier Thomas Culpeper. She also employed Francis Dereham, who had previously been informally engaged to her and had an affair with her prior to her marriage, as her secretary. The Privy Council was informed of her affair with Dereham whilst Henry was away; Thomas Cranmer was dispatched to investigate, and he brought evidence of Queen Catherine's previous affair with Dereham to the King's notice. Though Henry originally refused to believe the allegations, Dereham confessed. It took another meeting of the council, however, before Henry believed the accusations against Dereham and went into a rage, blaming the council before consoling himself in hunting. When questioned, the Queen could have admitted a prior contract to marry Dereham, which would have made her subsequent marriage to Henry invalid, but she instead claimed that Dereham had forced her to enter into an adulterous relationship. Dereham, meanwhile, exposed Catherine's relationship with Culpeper. Dereham and Culpeper were both executed, and Catherine too was beheaded on 13 February 1542.

=== Marriage to Catherine Parr ===
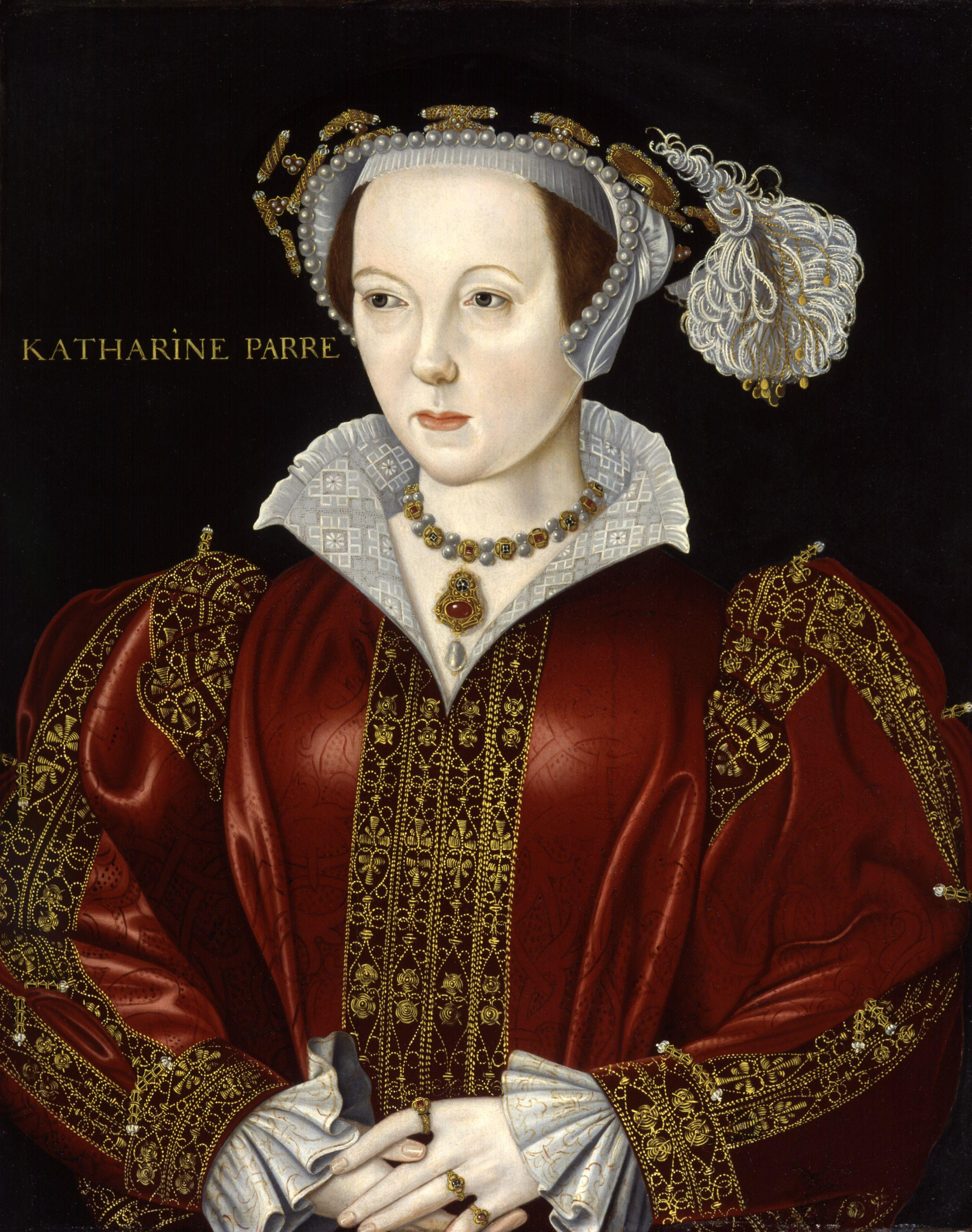
Catherine Parr, Henry's sixth and last wife

Henry married his last wife, the wealthy widow Catherine Parr, in July 1543. A reformer at heart, she argued with Henry over religion. Henry remained committed to an idiosyncratic mixture of Catholicism and Protestantism; the reactionary mood that had gained ground after Cromwell's fall had neither eliminated his Protestant streak nor been overcome by it. Parr helped reconcile Henry with his daughters, Mary and Elizabeth. In 1543, the Third Succession Act put them back in the line of succession after Edward. The same act allowed Henry to determine further succession to the throne in his will.

== Shrines destroyed and monasteries dissolved ==
In 1538, the chief minister Thomas Cromwell pursued an extensive campaign against what the government termed "idolatry" practised under the old religion, culminating in September with the dismantling of the shrine of St. Thomas Becket at Canterbury Cathedral. As a consequence, the King was excommunicated by Pope Paul III on 17 December of the same year. In 1540, Henry sanctioned the complete destruction of shrines to saints. In 1542, England's remaining monasteries were all dissolved, and their property transferred to the Crown. Abbots and priors lost their seats in the House of Lords. Consequently, the Lords Spiritual – as members of the clergy with seats in the House of Lords were known – were for the first time outnumbered by the Lords Temporal.

== Second invasion of France and the "Rough Wooing" of Scotland ==
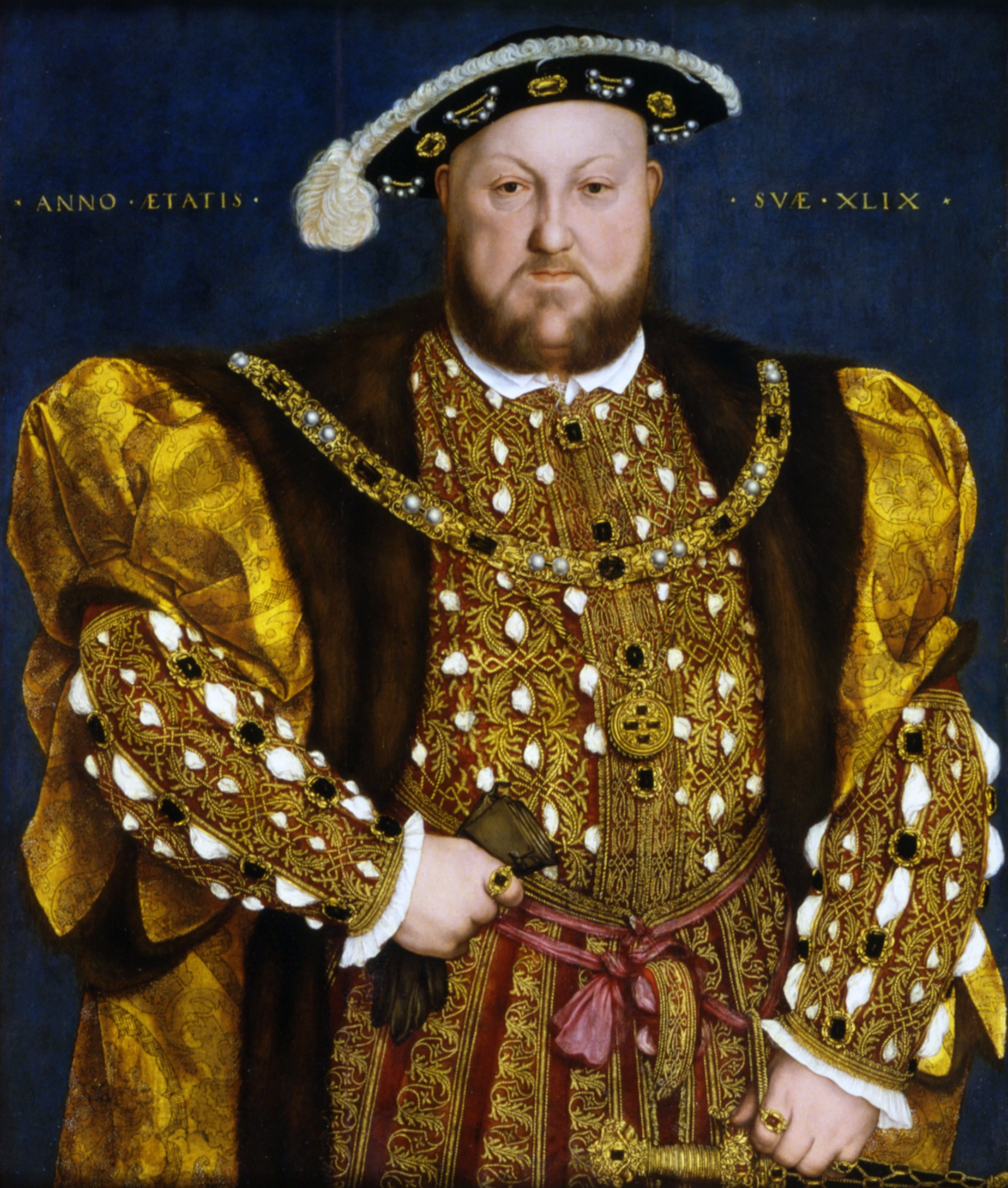
Henry in 1540, by Hans Holbein the Younger

The 1539 alliance between Francis and Charles had soured, eventually degenerating into renewed war. With Catherine of Aragon and Anne Boleyn dead, relations between Charles and Henry improved considerably, and Henry concluded a secret alliance with the Emperor and decided to enter the Italian War in favour of his new ally. An invasion of France was planned for 1543. In preparation for it, Henry moved to eliminate the potential threat of France's then-ally Scotland, then led by Henry's young nephew James V. The Scots were defeated at the Battle of Solway Moss on 24 November 1542, and James died on 15 December. Henry now hoped to unite the crowns of England and Scotland by marrying his son Edward to James's successor, Mary. The Scottish regent Lord Arran agreed to the marriage in the Treaty of Greenwich on 1 July 1543, but it was rejected by the Parliament of Scotland on 11 December. The result was eight years of war between England and Scotland, a campaign later dubbed "the Rough Wooing". Despite several peace treaties, unrest continued in Scotland until Henry's death.

Despite the early success with Scotland, Henry hesitated to invade France, annoying Charles. Henry finally went to France in June 1544 with a two-pronged attack. One force under Norfolk ineffectively besieged Montreuil. The other, under Suffolk, laid siege to Boulogne. Henry later took personal command, and Boulogne fell on 18 September 1544. However, Henry had refused Charles's request to march against Paris. Charles's own campaign fizzled, and he made peace with France that same day. Henry was left alone against France, unable to make peace. Francis attempted to invade England in the summer of 1545 but his forces reached only the Isle of Wight before being repulsed in the Battle of the Solent. Financially exhausted, France and England signed the Treaty of Camp on 7 June 1546. Henry secured Boulogne for eight years. The city was then to be returned to France for 2 million crowns (£750,000). Henry needed the money; the 1544 campaign had cost £650,000, and England was once again facing bankruptcy.

== Physical decline and death ==
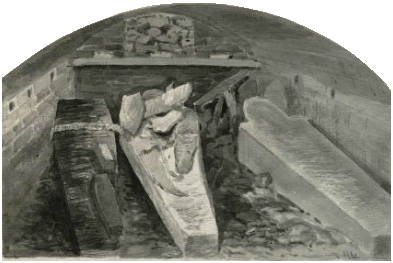
Coffins of King Henry VIII (centre, damaged), Queen Jane Seymour (right), King Charles I with a child of Queen Anne (left), contained in a vault under the choir at St George's Chapel, Windsor Castle, marked by a stone slab in the floor; 1888 sketch by Alfred Young Nutt, Surveyor to the Dean and Canons

Late in life, Henry became obese, with a waist measurement of 54 inches (140 cm), and had to be moved about with the help of mechanical devices. He was covered with painful, pus-filled boils and possibly had gout. His obesity and other medical problems can be traced to the jousting accident on 24 January 1536 in which he suffered a leg wound. The accident reopened and aggravated an injury he had sustained years earlier, to the extent that his doctors found it difficult to treat. The chronic wound festered for the remainder of his life and became ulcerated, preventing him from maintaining the level of physical activity he had previously enjoyed. The jousting accident is also believed to have caused Henry's mood swings, which may have had a dramatic effect on his personality and temperament.

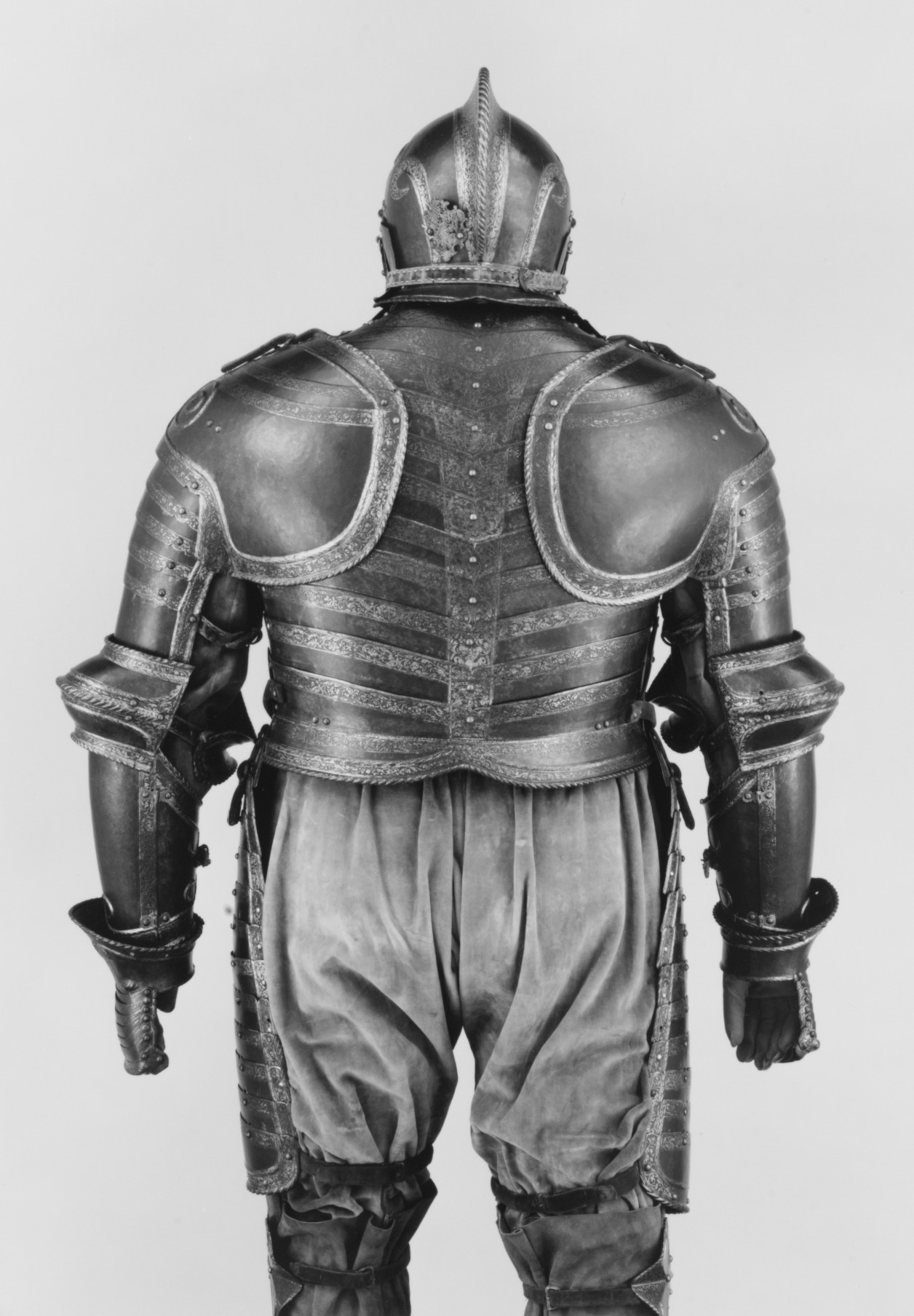
This suit of armour was commissioned c. 1544 when Henry's midsection had a girth of 51 inches.

The theory that Henry had syphilis has been dismissed by most historians. Historian Susan Maclean Kybett ascribes his death to scurvy, which is caused by insufficient vitamin C most often due to a lack of fresh fruit and vegetables in one's diet.

A 2010 study suggests Henry may have been of Kell-positive blood type to explain both his physical and mental deterioration, being consistent with some symptoms of the McLeod syndrome, and the high mortality in the pregnancies attributed to him.

Henry's obesity hastened his death at the age of 55, on 28 January 1547 at the Palace of Whitehall, on what would have been his father's 90th birthday. The tomb he had planned (with components taken from the tomb intended for Cardinal Wolsey) was only partly constructed and was never completed (the sarcophagus and its base were later removed and used for Lord Nelson's tomb in the crypt of St Paul's Cathedral). Henry was interred in a vault at St George's Chapel, Windsor Castle, next to Jane Seymour. Over 100 years later, King Charles I (ruled 1625–1649) was buried in the same vault.

== Wives, mistresses, and children ==
Known children of Henry VIII of England
Name	Birth	Death	Notes
By Catherine of Aragon (married Palace of Placentia 11 June 1509; annulled 23 May 1533)
Unnamed daughter	31 January 1510		stillborn
Henry, Duke of Cornwall	1 January 1511	22 February 1511	died aged almost two months
Unnamed son	17 September 1513		died shortly after birth
Unnamed son	November 1514		died shortly after birth
Queen Mary I	18 February 1516	17 November 1558	married Philip II of Spain in 1554; no issue
Unnamed daughter	10 November 1518		stillborn in the 8th month of pregnancy or lived at least one week
By Elizabeth Blount (mistress; bore the only illegitimate child Henry VIII acknowledged as his)
Henry FitzRoy, 1st Duke of Richmond and Somerset	15 June 1519	23 July 1536	illegitimate; acknowledged by Henry VIII in 1525; no issue
By Anne Boleyn (married Dover 14 November 1532, and then again Westminster Abbey 25 January 1533; annulled 17 May 1536) beheaded 19 May 1536
Queen Elizabeth I	7 September 1533	24 March 1603	never married; no issue
Unnamed child	Summer 1534		miscarriage or false pregnancy (Note: Eustace Chapuys wrote to Charles V on 28 January reporting that Anne was pregnant. A letter from George Taylor to Lady Lisle dated 27 April 1534 says "The queen hath a goodly belly, praying our Lord to send us a prince". In July, Anne's brother, Lord Rochford, was sent on a diplomatic mission to France to ask for the postponement of a meeting between Henry VIII and Francis I because of Anne's condition: "being so far gone with child she could not cross the sea with the king". Chapuys backs this up in a letter dated 27 July, where he refers to Anne's pregnancy. We do not know what happened with this pregnancy as there is no evidence of the outcome. Dewhurst writes of how the pregnancy could have resulted in a miscarriage or stillbirth, but there is no evidence to support this, he therefore wonders if it was a case of pseudocyesis, a false pregnancy, caused by the stress that Anne was under – the pressure to provide a son. Chapuys wrote on 27 September 1534 "Since the king began to doubt whether his lady was enceinte or not, he has renewed and increased the love he formerly had for a beautiful damsel of the court". Muriel St Clair Byrne, editor of the Lisle Letters, believes that this was a false pregnancy too.)
Unnamed child	1535		Possible miscarriage (Note: The only evidence for a miscarriage in 1535 is a sentence from a letter from William Kingston to Lord Lisle on 24 June 1535 when Kingston says "Her Grace has as fair a belly as I have ever seen". However, Dewhurst thinks that there is an error in the dating of this letter as the editor of the Lisle Letters states that this letter is actually from 1533 or 1534 because it also refers to Christopher Garneys, a man who died in October 1534.)
Unnamed son	29 January 1536		miscarriage of a child, believed male, (Note: Chapuys reported to Charles V on 10 February 1536 that Anne Boleyn had miscarried on the day of Catherine of Aragon's funeral: "On the day of the interment [of Catherine of Aragon] the concubine [Anne] had an abortion which seemed to be a male child which she had not borne 3 1/2 months".) in the fourth month of pregnancy
By Jane Seymour (married Palace of Whitehall 30 May 1536) died 24 October 1537
King Edward VI	12 October 1537	6 July 1553	died unmarried, age 15; no issue
By Anne of Cleves (married Palace of Placentia 6 January 1540) annulled 9 July 1540
no issue
By Catherine Howard (married Oatlands Palace 28 July 1540; annulled 23 November 1541) beheaded 13 February 1542
no issue
By Catherine Parr (married Hampton Court Palace 12 July 1543) Henry VIII died 28 January 1547
no issue

== Succession ==
All of Henry's surviving children succeeded him as monarchs.

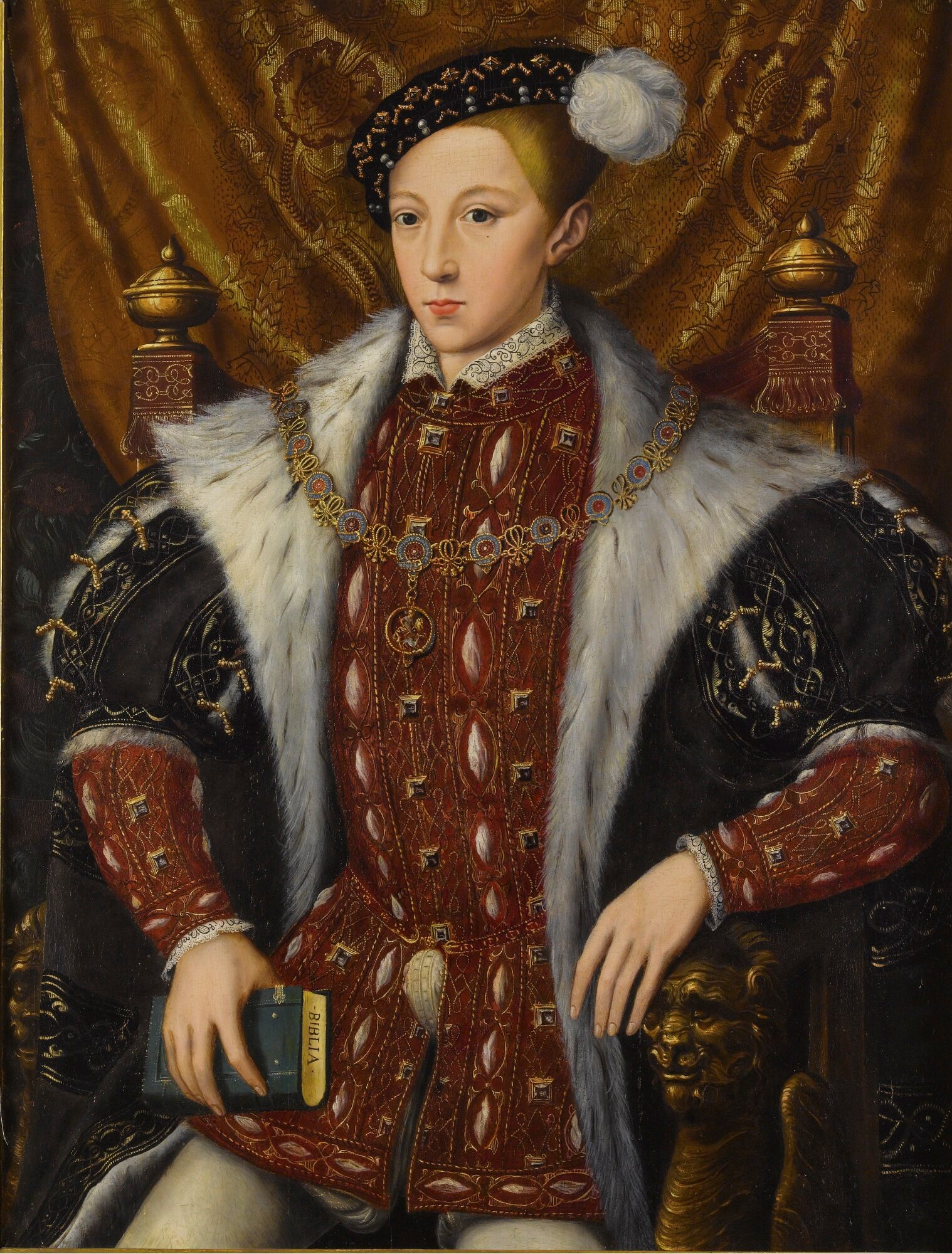
Edward VI
r. 1547–1553

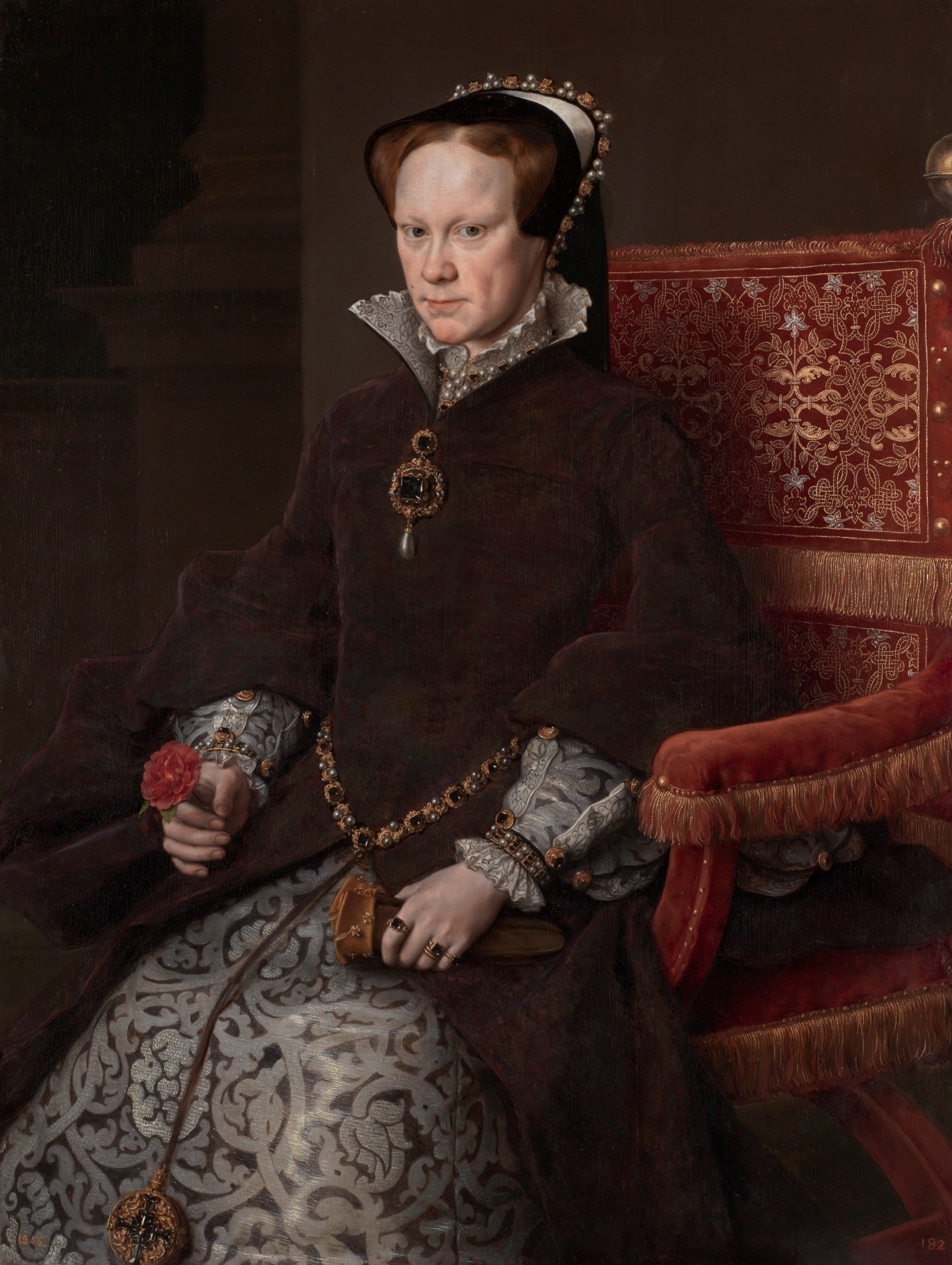
Mary I
r. 1553–1558

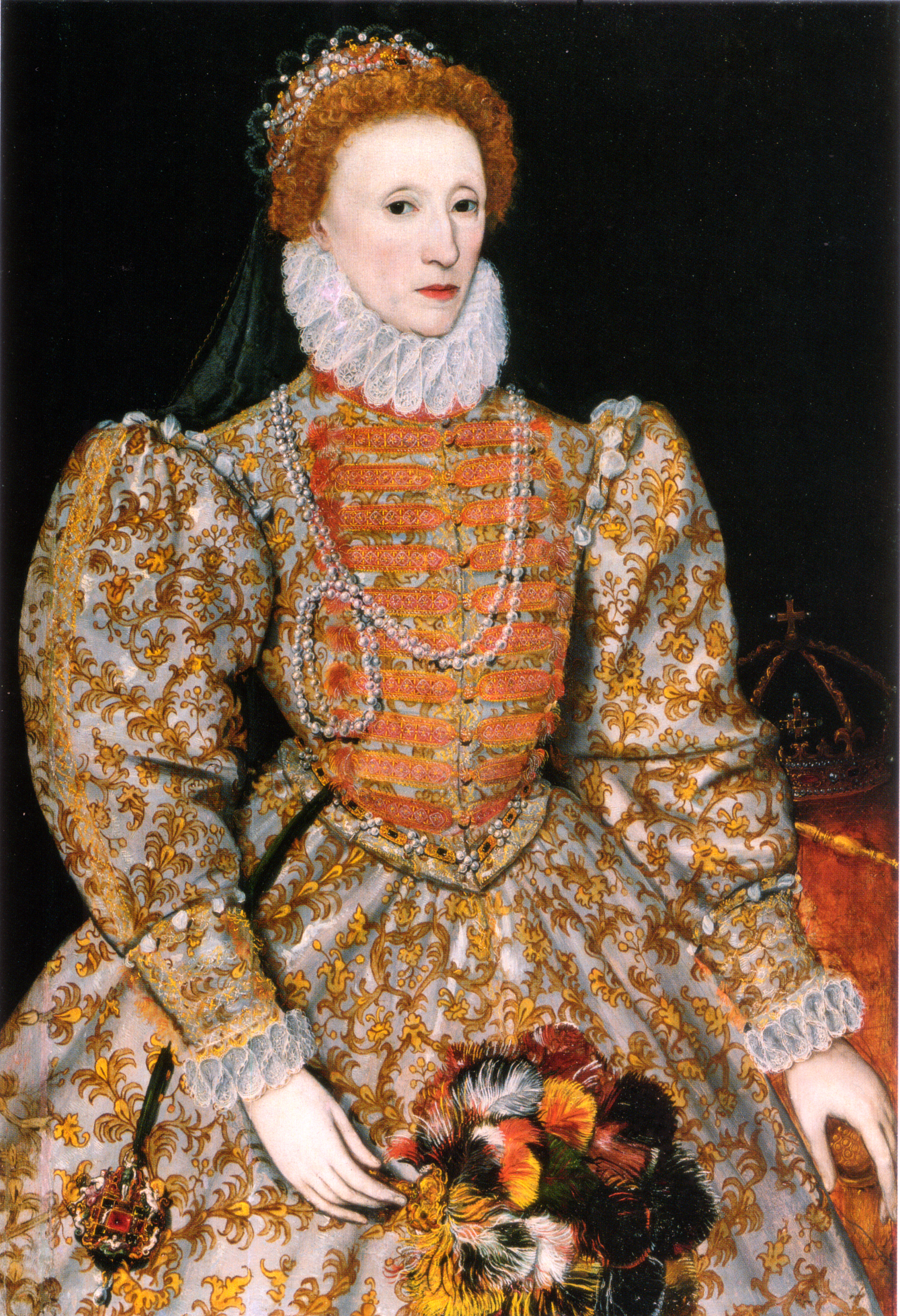
Elizabeth I
r. 1558–1603

Upon Henry's death, he was succeeded by his only surviving son, Edward VI. Since Edward was then only nine years old, he could not rule directly. Instead, Henry's will designated 16 executors to serve on a regency council until Edward reached 18. The executors chose Edward Seymour, 1st Earl of Hertford, elder brother to Jane Seymour (Edward's mother), to be Lord Protector of the Realm. Under provisions of the will, if Edward died childless, the throne was to pass to Mary, Henry VIII's daughter by Catherine of Aragon, and her heirs.

If Mary's issue failed, the crown was to go to Elizabeth, Henry's daughter by Anne Boleyn, and her heirs. Finally, if Elizabeth's line became extinct, the crown was to be inherited by the descendants of Henry VIII's deceased younger sister, Mary, the Greys.

The descendants of Henry's sister Margaret Tudor – the Stuarts, rulers of Scotland – were thereby excluded from the succession. This provision ultimately failed when James VI of Scotland, Margaret's great-grandson, became king of England and Ireland in 1603.

Edward VI himself would disregard the will and name his cousin Lady Jane Grey his successor.

== Public image ==
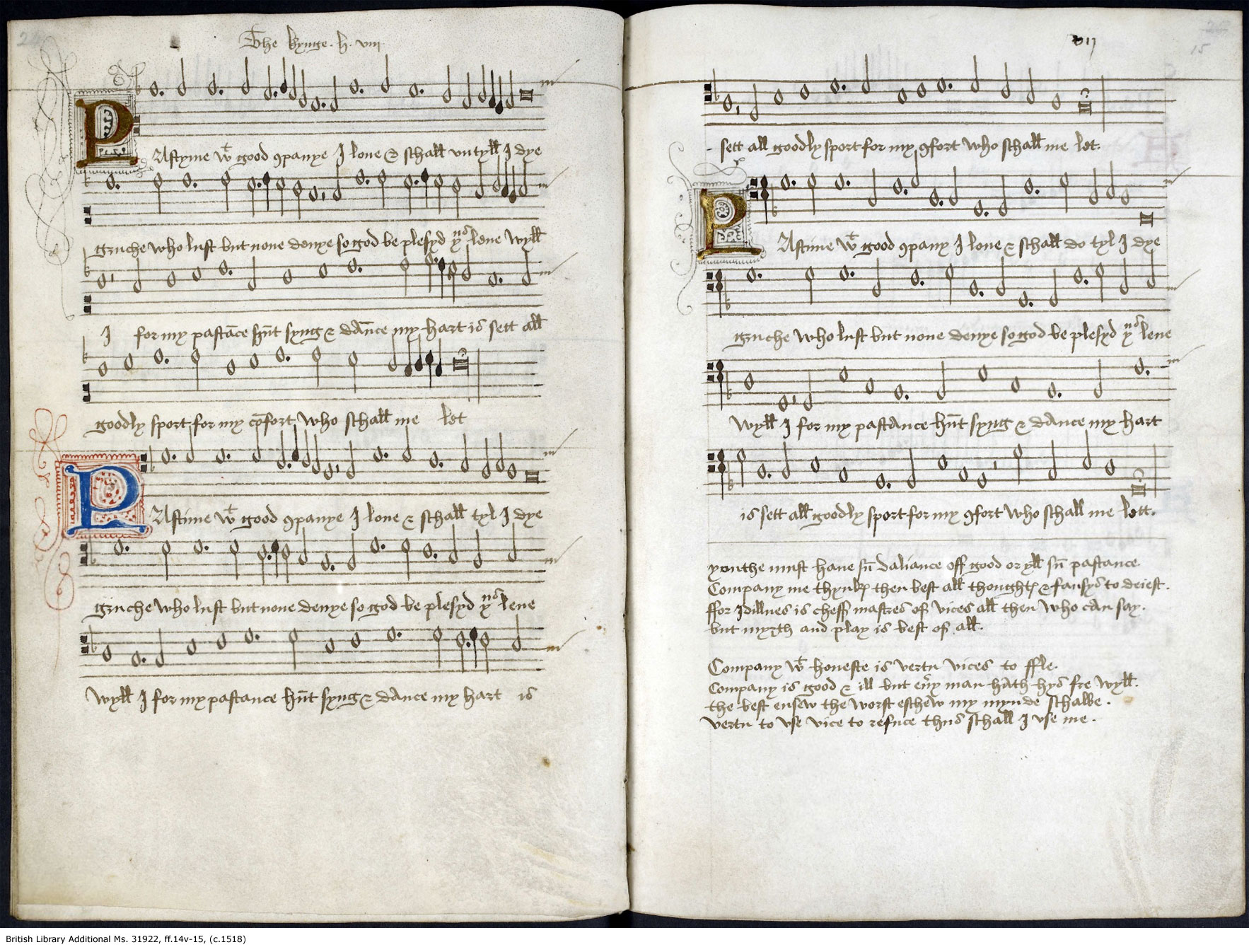
Musical score of "Pastime with Good Company", c. 1513, composed by Henry

Henry cultivated the image of a Renaissance man, and his court was a centre of scholarly and artistic innovation and glamorous excess, epitomised by the Field of the Cloth of Gold. He scouted the country for choirboys, taking some directly from Wolsey's choir, and introduced Renaissance music into court. Musicians included Benedict de Opitiis, Richard Sampson, Ambrose Lupo, and Venetian organist Dionisio Memo, and Henry himself played and kept a considerable collection of flute instruments including recorders. He was skilled on the lute and played the organ, and was a talented player of the virginals. He could also sightread music and sing well. He was an accomplished musician, author, and poet; his best-known work is "Pastime with Good Company" ("The Kynges Ballade"). It is also frequently said that Henry wrote the sixteenth-century English folk song "Greensleeves". However, it is certain he did not, as "Greensleeves" is based on an Italian style of composition that did not reach England until after Henry's death.

Henry was an avid gambler and dice player, and excelled at sports, especially jousting, hunting and real tennis. He was also known for his strong defence of conventional Christian piety. He was involved in the construction and improvement of several significant buildings, including Nonsuch Palace, King's College Chapel, Cambridge, and Westminster Abbey in London. Many of the existing buildings which he improved were properties confiscated from Wolsey, such as Christ Church, Oxford, Hampton Court Palace, the Palace of Whitehall and Trinity College, Cambridge.

Henry was an intellectual, the first English king with a modern humanist education. He read and wrote English, French and Latin, and owned a large library. He annotated many books and published one of his own, and he had numerous pamphlets and lectures prepared to support the reformation of the church. Richard Sampson's Oratio (1534), for example, was an argument for absolute obedience to the monarchy and claimed that the English church had always been independent of Rome. At the popular level, theatre and minstrel troupes funded by the crown travelled around the land to promote the new religious practices; the Pope and Catholic priests and monks were mocked as foreign devils, while Henry was hailed as the glorious king of England and as a brave and heroic defender of the true faith. Henry worked hard to present an image of unchallengeable authority and irresistible power.

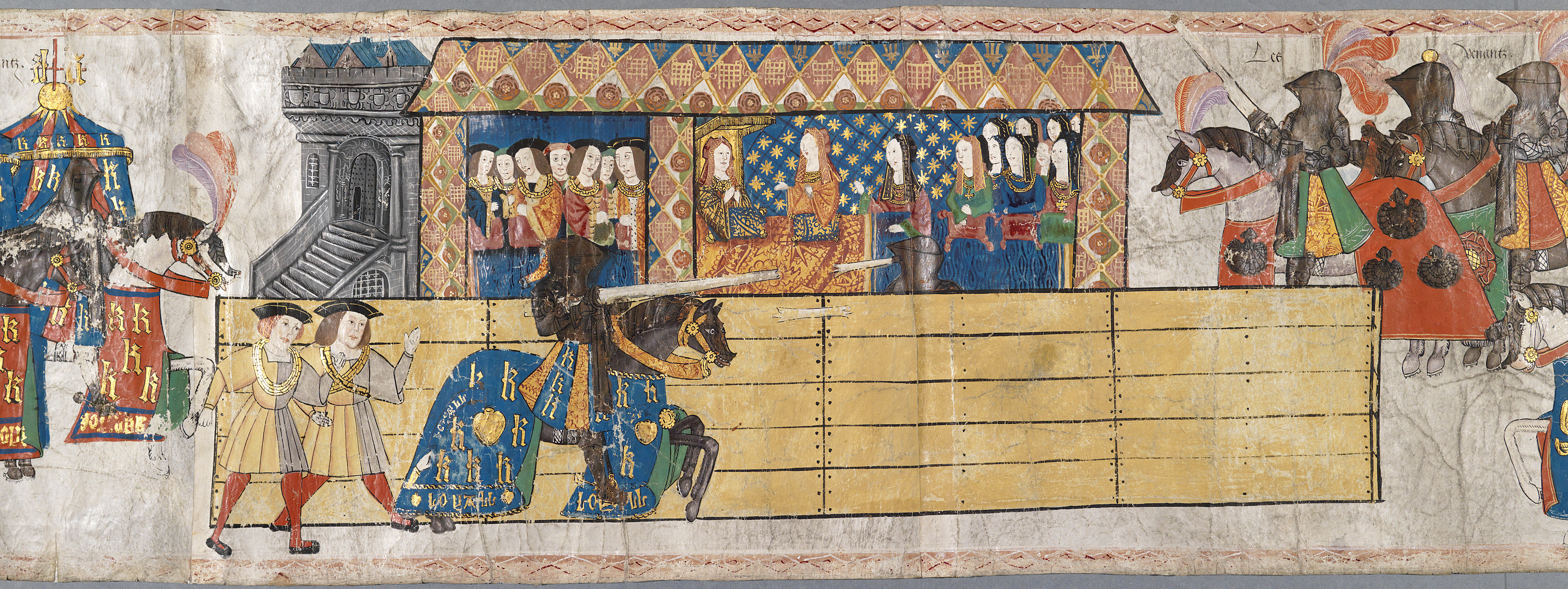
Catherine of Aragon watching Henry jousting in her honour after she had given birth to a son

Henry was a large, well-built athlete, over 6 feet [1.8 m] tall, strong, and broad in proportion. His athletic activities were more than pastimes; they were political devices that served multiple goals, enhancing his image, impressing foreign emissaries and rulers, and conveying his ability to suppress any rebellion. He arranged a jousting tournament at Greenwich in 1517 where he wore gilded armour and gilded horse trappings, and outfits of velvet, satin, and cloth of gold with pearls and jewels. It suitably impressed foreign ambassadors, one of whom wrote home that "the wealth and civilisation of the world are here, and those who call the English barbarians appear to me to render themselves such". Henry finally retired from jousting in 1536 after a heavy fall from his horse left him unconscious for two hours, but he continued to sponsor two lavish tournaments a year. He then started gaining weight and lost the trim, athletic figure that had made him so handsome, and his courtiers began dressing in heavily padded clothes to emulate and flatter him. His health declined rapidly near the end of his reign.

== Government ==
The power of Tudor monarchs, including Henry, was 'whole' and 'entire', ruling, as they claimed, by the grace of God alone. The Crown could also rely on the exclusive use of those functions that constituted the royal prerogative. These included acts of diplomacy (including royal marriages), declarations of war, management of the coinage, the issue of royal pardons and the power to summon and dissolve Parliament as and when required. Nevertheless, as evident during Henry's break with Rome, the monarch stayed within established limits, whether legal or financial, that forced him to work closely with both the nobility and Parliament (representing the gentry).

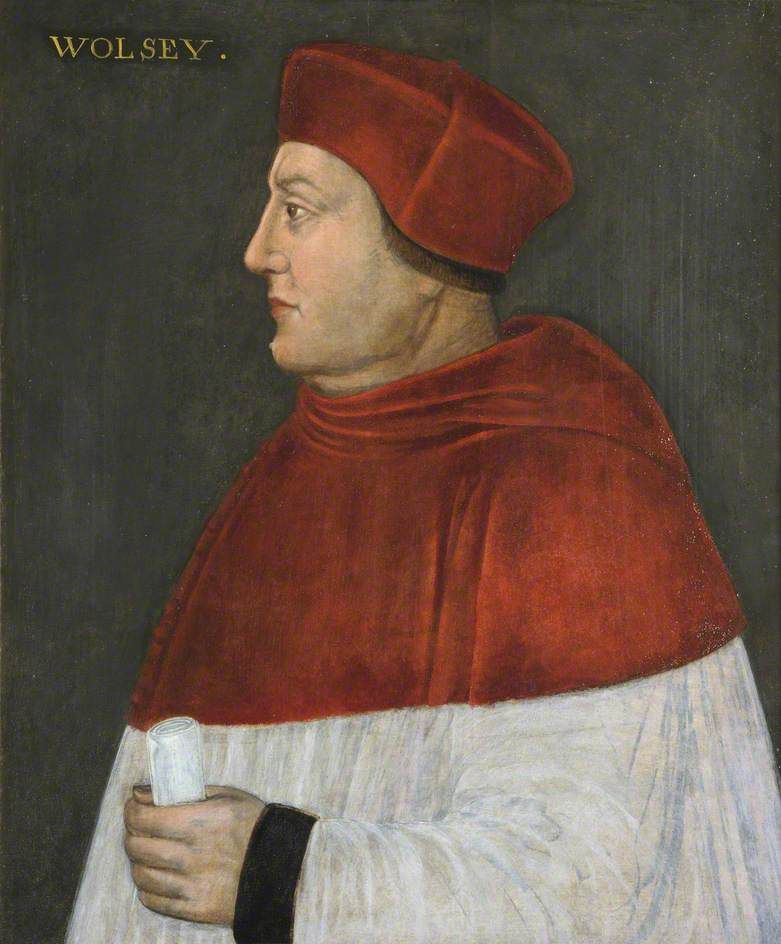
Cardinal Thomas Wolsey

In practice, Tudor monarchs used patronage to maintain a royal court that included formal institutions such as the Privy Council as well as more informal advisers and confidants. Both the rise and fall of court nobles could be swift: Henry did undoubtedly execute at will, burning or beheading two of his wives, 20 peers, four leading public servants, six close attendants and friends, one cardinal (John Fisher) and numerous abbots. Among those who were in favour at any given point in Henry's reign, one could usually be identified as a chief minister, though one of the enduring debates in the historiography of the period has been the extent to which those chief ministers controlled Henry rather than vice versa. In particular, historian G. R. Elton has argued that one such minister, Thomas Cromwell, led a "Tudor revolution in government" independently of the King, whom Elton presented as an opportunistic, essentially lazy participant in the nitty-gritty of politics. Where Henry did intervene personally in the running of the country, Elton argued, he mostly did so to its detriment. The prominence and influence of faction in Henry's court is similarly discussed in the context of at least five episodes of Henry's reign, including the downfall of Anne Boleyn.

From 1514 to 1529, Thomas Wolsey, a cardinal of the established Church, oversaw domestic and foreign policy for the King from his position as Lord Chancellor. Wolsey centralised the national government and extended the jurisdiction of the conciliar courts, particularly the Star Chamber. The Star Chamber's overall structure remained unchanged, but Wolsey used it to provide much-needed reform of the criminal law. The power of the court itself did not outlive Wolsey, however, since no serious administrative reform was undertaken and its role eventually devolved to the localities. Wolsey helped fill the gap left by Henry's declining participation in government (particularly in comparison to his father) but did so mostly by imposing himself in the King's place. His use of these courts to pursue personal grievances, and particularly to treat delinquents as mere examples of a whole class worthy of punishment, angered the rich, who were annoyed as well by his enormous wealth and ostentatious living. Following Wolsey's downfall, Henry took full control of his government, although at court numerous complex factions continued to try to ruin and destroy each other.

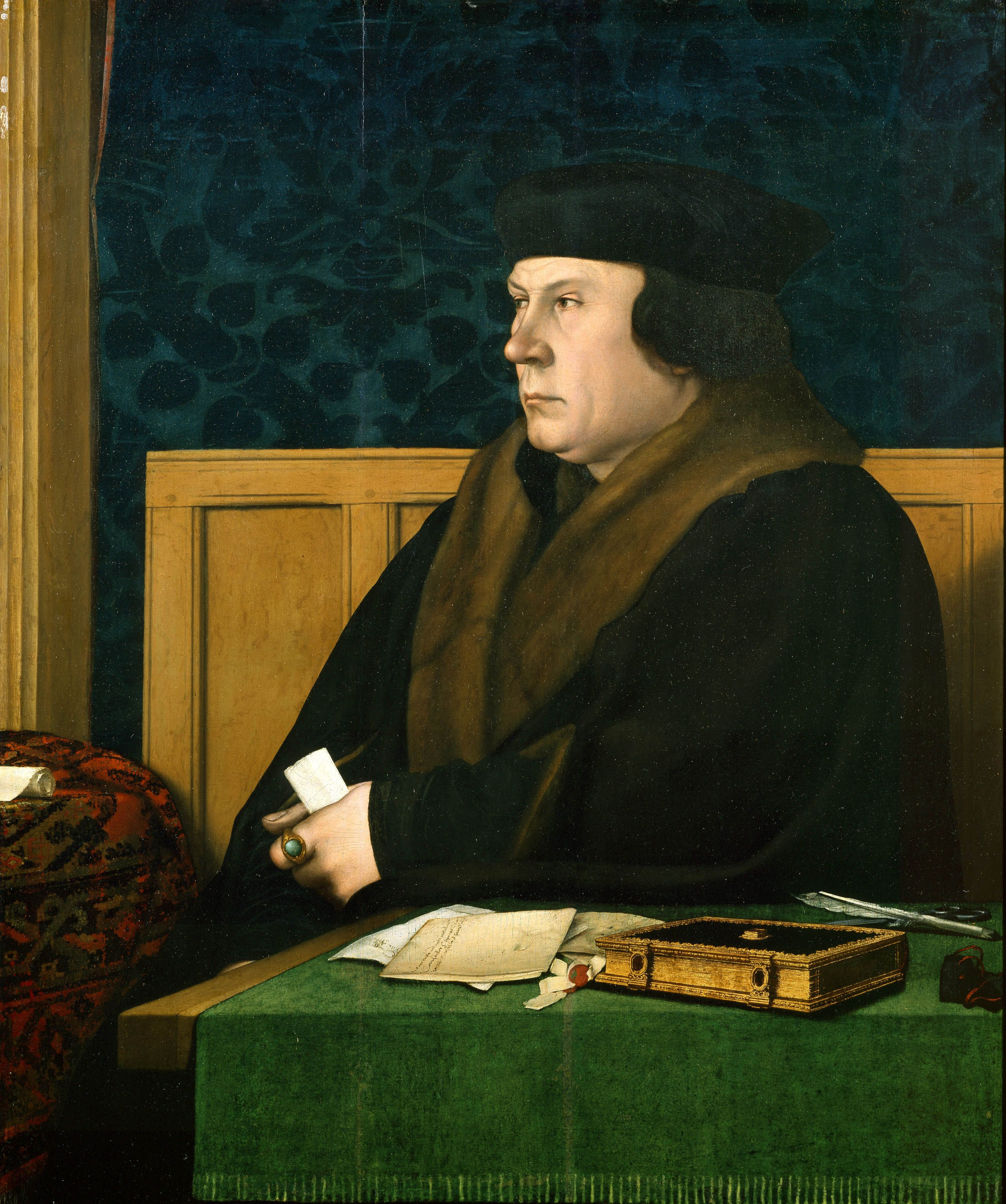
Thomas Cromwell in 1532 or 1533

Thomas Cromwell also came to define Henry's government. Returning to England from the continent in 1514 or 1515, Cromwell soon entered Wolsey's service. He turned to law, also picking up a good knowledge of the Bible, and was admitted to Gray's Inn in 1524. He became Wolsey's "man of all work". Driven in part by his religious beliefs, Cromwell attempted to reform the body politic of the English government through discussion and consent, and through the vehicle of continuity, not outward change. Many saw him as the man they wanted to bring about their shared aims, including Thomas Audley. By 1531, Cromwell and his associates were already responsible for the drafting of much legislation. Cromwell's first office was that of the master of the King's jewels in 1532, from which he began to invigorate the government finances. By that point, Cromwell's power as an efficient administrator, in a Council full of politicians, exceeded what Wolsey had achieved.

Cromwell did much work through his many offices to remove the tasks of government from the Royal Household (and ideologically from the personal body of the King) and into a public state. But he did so in a haphazard fashion that left several remnants, not least because he needed to retain Henry's support, his own power, and the possibility of actually achieving the plan he set out. Cromwell made the various income streams Henry VII put in place more formal and assigned largely autonomous bodies for their administration. The role of the King's Council was transferred to a reformed Privy Council, much smaller and more efficient than its predecessor. A difference emerged between the King's financial health and the country's, although Cromwell's fall undermined much of his bureaucracy, which required him to keep order among the many new bodies and prevent profligate spending that strained relations as well as finances. Cromwell's reforms ground to a halt in 1539, the initiative lost, and he failed to secure the passage of an enabling act, the Proclamation by the Crown Act 1539. He was executed on 28 July 1540.

=== Finances ===
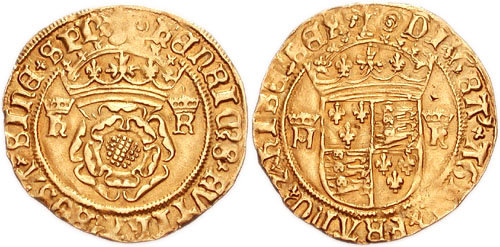
Gold crown of Henry VIII, minted c. 1544–1547. The reverse depicts the quartered arms of England and France.

Henry inherited a vast fortune and a prosperous economy from his father, who had been frugal. This fortune is estimated at £1,250,000 (the equivalent of £375 million today). By comparison, Henry VIII's reign was a near disaster financially. He augmented the royal treasury by seizing church lands, but his heavy spending and long periods of mismanagement damaged the economy.

Henry spent much of his wealth on maintaining his court and household, including many of the building works he undertook on royal palaces. He hung 2,000 tapestries in his palaces; by comparison, James V of Scotland hung just 200. Henry took pride in showing off his collection of weapons, which included exotic archery equipment, 2,250 pieces of land ordnance and 6,500 handguns. Tudor monarchs had to fund all government expenses out of their own income. This income came from the crown lands that Henry owned as well as from customs duties like tonnage and poundage, granted by Parliament to the King for life. During Henry's reign the revenues of the Crown remained constant (around £100,000), but were eroded by inflation and rising prices brought about by war. Indeed, war and Henry's dynastic ambitions in Europe exhausted the surplus he had inherited from his father by the mid-1520s.

Henry VII had not involved Parliament in his affairs very much, but Henry VIII had to turn to Parliament during his reign for money, in particular for grants of subsidies to fund his wars. The dissolution of the monasteries provided a means to replenish the treasury, and as a result, the Crown took possession of monastic lands worth £120,000 (£36 million) a year. The Crown had profited by a small amount in 1526 when Wolsey put England onto a gold, rather than silver, standard, and had debased the currency slightly. Cromwell debased the currency more significantly, starting in Ireland in 1540. The English pound halved in value against the Flemish pound between 1540 and 1551 as a result. The nominal profit made was significant, helping to bring income and expenditure together, but it had a catastrophic effect on the country's economy. In part, it helped to bring about a period of very high inflation from 1544 onwards.

=== Reformation ===
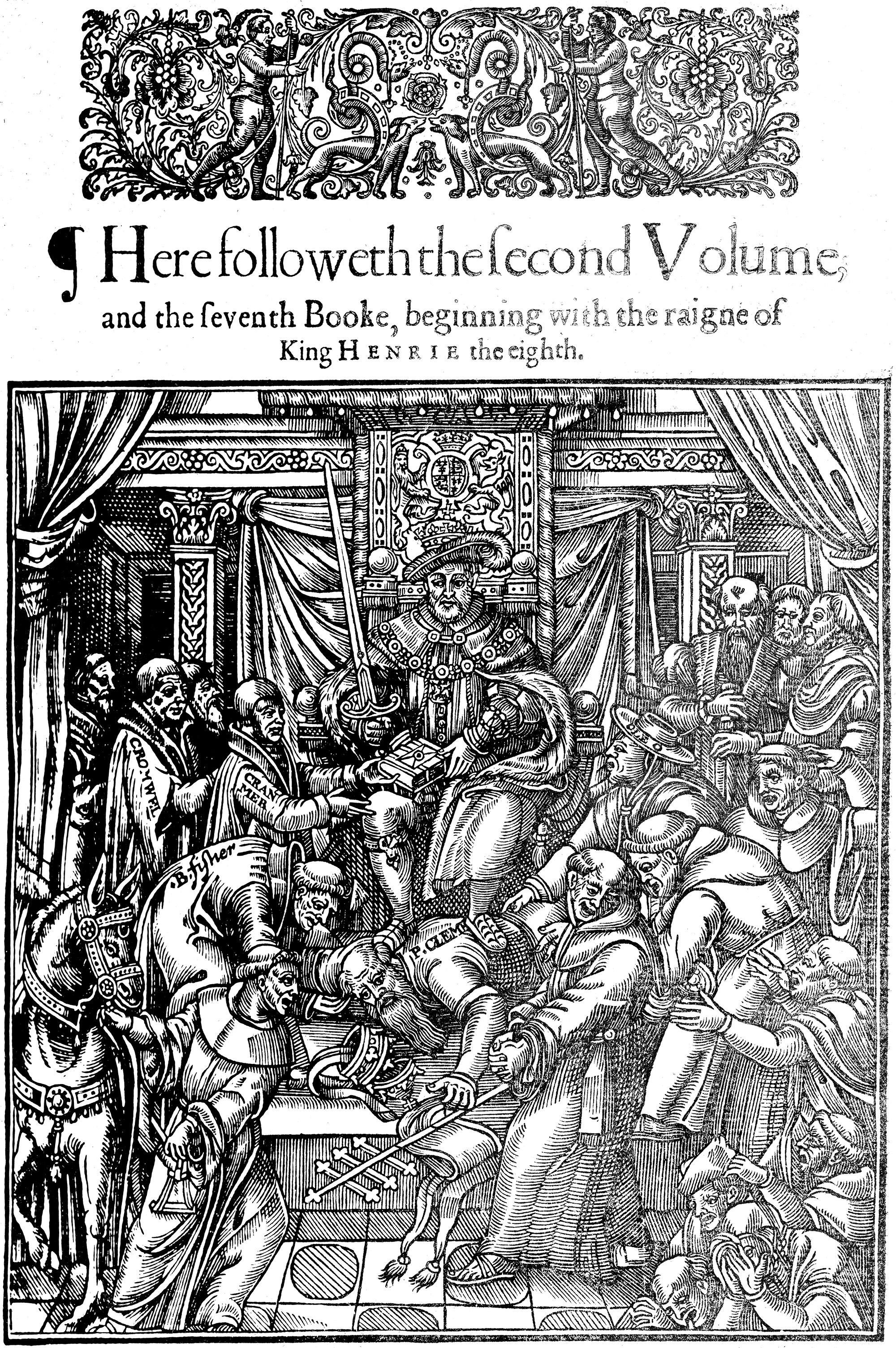
Henry VIII sitting with his feet upon Clement VII, 1641

Henry is generally credited with initiating the English Reformation – the process of transforming England from a Catholic country to a Protestant one – though his progress at the elite and mass levels is disputed, and the precise narrative not widely agreed upon. Certainly, in 1527, Henry, until then an observant and well-informed Catholic, appealed to the Pope for an annulment of his marriage to Catherine. No annulment was immediately forthcoming, since the papacy was now under the control of Charles V, Catherine's nephew. The traditional narrative gives this refusal as the trigger for Henry's rejection of papal supremacy, which he had previously defended. Yet as E. L. Woodward put it, Henry's determination to annul his marriage with Catherine was the occasion rather than the cause of the English Reformation so that "neither too much nor too little" should be made of the annulment. Historian A. F. Pollard has argued that even if Henry had not needed an annulment, he might have come to reject papal control over the governance of England purely for political reasons. Indeed, Henry needed a son to secure the Tudor Dynasty and avert the risk of civil war over disputed succession.

In any case, between 1532 and 1537, Henry instituted a number of statutes that dealt with the relationship between king and pope and hence the structure of the nascent Church of England. These included the Statute in Restraint of Appeals (passed 1533), which extended the charge of praemunire against all who introduced papal bulls into England, potentially exposing them to the death penalty if found guilty. Other acts included the Supplication against the Ordinaries and the Submission of the Clergy, which recognised Royal Supremacy over the church. The Ecclesiastical Appointments Act 1534 required the clergy to elect bishops nominated by the Sovereign. The Act of Supremacy in 1534 declared that the King was "the only Supreme Head on Earth of the Church of England" and the Treasons Act 1534 made it high treason, punishable by death, to refuse the Oath of Supremacy acknowledging the King as such. Similarly, following the passage of the Act of Succession 1533, all adults in the kingdom were required to acknowledge the Act's provisions (declaring Henry's marriage to Anne legitimate and his marriage to Catherine illegitimate) by oath; those who refused were subject to imprisonment for life, and any publisher or printer of any literature alleging that the marriage to Anne was invalid subject to the death penalty. Finally, the Peter's Pence Act was passed, and it reiterated that England had "no superior under God, but only your Grace" and that Henry's "imperial crown" had been diminished by "the unreasonable and uncharitable usurpations and exactions" of the Pope. The King had much support from the Church under Cranmer.

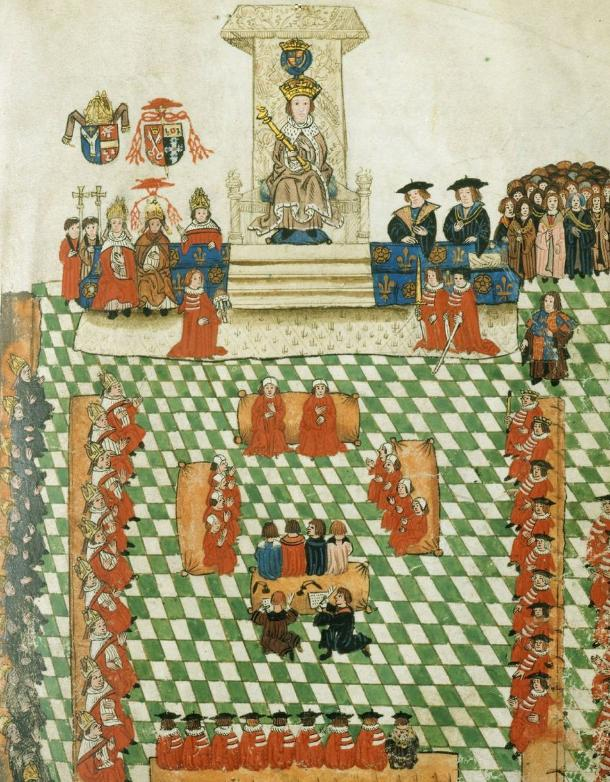
A 16th-century depiction of the Parliament of King Henry VIII

To Cromwell's annoyance, Henry insisted on parliamentary time to discuss questions of faith, which he achieved through the Duke of Norfolk. This led to the passing of the Act of Six Articles, whereby six major questions were all answered by asserting the religious orthodoxy, thus restraining the reform movement in England. It was followed by the beginnings of a reformed liturgy and of the Book of Common Prayer, which would take until 1549 to complete. But this victory for religious conservatives did not convert into much change in personnel, and Cranmer remained in his position. Overall, the rest of Henry's reign saw a subtle movement away from religious orthodoxy, helped in part by the deaths of prominent figures from before the break with Rome, especially the executions of Thomas More and John Fisher in 1535 for refusing to renounce papal authority. Henry established a new political theology of obedience to the crown that continued for the next decade. It reflected Martin Luther's new interpretation of the fourth commandment ("Honour thy father and mother"), brought to England by William Tyndale. The founding of royal authority on the Ten Commandments was another important shift: reformers within the Church used the Commandments' emphasis on faith and the word of God, while conservatives emphasised the need for dedication to God and doing good. The reformers' efforts lay behind the publication of the Great Bible in 1539 in English. Protestant Reformers still faced persecution, particularly over objections to Henry's annulment. Many fled abroad, including the influential Tyndale, who was eventually executed and his body burned at Henry's behest.

When taxes once payable to Rome were transferred to the Crown, Cromwell saw the need to assess the taxable value of the Church's extensive holdings as they stood in 1535. The result was an extensive compendium, the Valor Ecclesiasticus. In September 1535, Cromwell commissioned a more general visitation of religious institutions, to be undertaken by four appointee visitors. The visitation focused almost exclusively on the country's religious houses, with largely negative conclusions. In addition to reporting back to Cromwell, the visitors made the lives of the monks more difficult by enforcing strict behavioural standards. The result was to encourage self-dissolution. In any case, the evidence Cromwell gathered led swiftly to the beginning of the state-enforced dissolution of the monasteries, with all religious houses worth less than £200 vested by statute in the crown in January 1536. After a short pause, surviving religious houses were transferred one by one to the Crown and new owners, and the dissolution confirmed by a further statute in 1539. By January 1540 no such houses remained; 800 had been dissolved. The process had been efficient, with minimal resistance, and brought the crown some £90,000 a year. The extent to which the dissolution of all houses was planned from the start is debated by historians; there is some evidence that major houses were originally intended only to be reformed. Cromwell's actions transferred a fifth of England's landed wealth to new hands. The programme was designed primarily to create a landed gentry beholden to the crown, which would use the lands much more efficiently. Although little opposition to the supremacy could be found in England's religious houses, they had links to the international church and were an obstacle to further religious reform.

Response to the reforms was mixed. The religious houses had been the only support of the impoverished, and the reforms alienated much of the populace outside London, helping to provoke the great northern rising of 1536–37, known as the Pilgrimage of Grace. Elsewhere the changes were accepted and welcomed, and those who clung to Catholic rites kept quiet or moved in secrecy. They reemerged during the reign of Henry's daughter Mary (1553–58).

=== Military ===
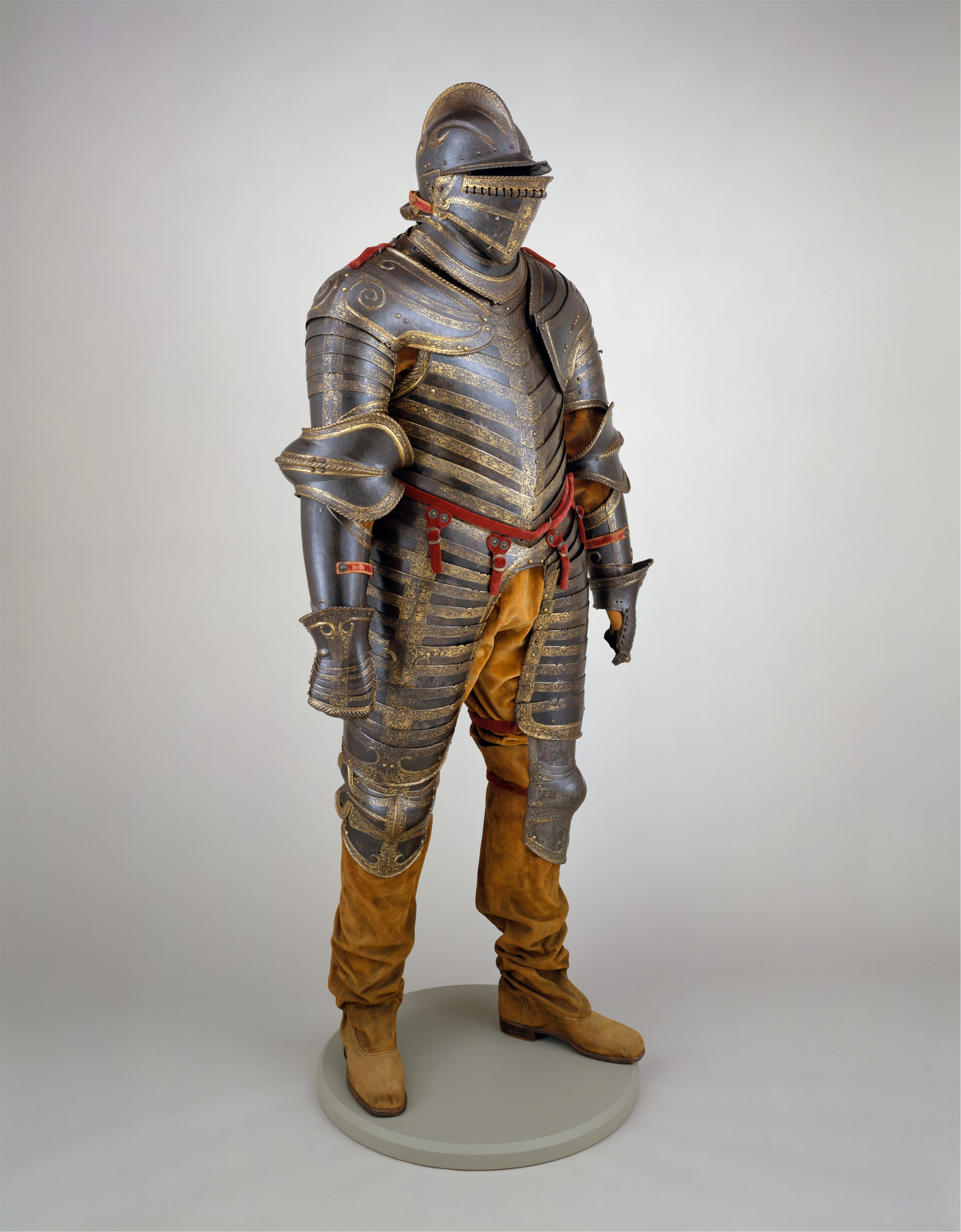
Henry's Italian-made suit of armour, c. 1544

Apart from permanent garrisons at Berwick, Calais, and Carlisle, England's standing army numbered only a few hundred men. This was increased only slightly by Henry. Henry's invasion force of 1513, some 30,000 men, was composed of billmen and longbowmen, at a time when the other European nations were moving to hand guns and pikemen but the difference in capability was at this stage not significant, and Henry's forces had new armour and weaponry. They were also supported by battlefield artillery and the war wagon, relatively new innovations, and several large and expensive siege guns. The invasion force of 1544 was similarly well-equipped and organised, although command on the battlefield was laid with the dukes of Suffolk and Norfolk, which in the latter case produced disastrous results at Montreuil.

Henry's break with Rome incurred the threat of a large-scale French or Spanish invasion. To guard against this, in 1538 he began to build a chain of expensive, state-of-the-art defences along Britain's southern and eastern coasts, from Kent to Cornwall, largely built of material gained from the demolition of the monasteries. These were known as Henry VIII's Device Forts. He also strengthened existing coastal defence fortresses such as Dover Castle and, at Dover, Moat Bulwark and Archcliffe Fort, which he visited for a few months to supervise. Wolsey had many years before conducted the censuses required for an overhaul of the system of militia, but no reform resulted. In 1538–39, Cromwell overhauled the shire musters, but his work mainly served to demonstrate how inadequate they were in organisation. The building works, including that at Berwick, along with the reform of the militias and musters, were eventually finished under Queen Mary.

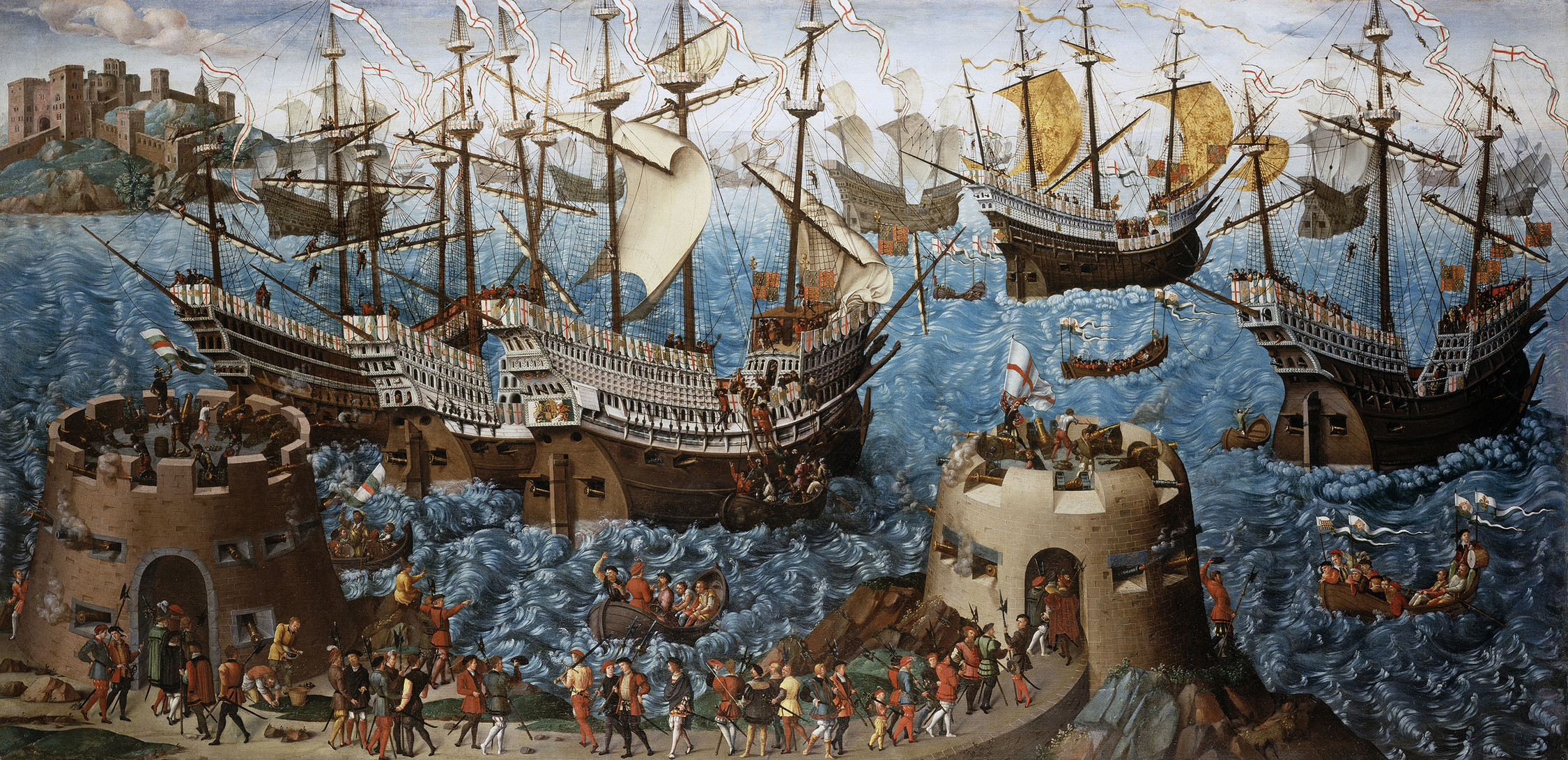
Depiction of Henry embarking at Dover, c. 1520

Henry is traditionally cited as one of the founders of the Royal Navy. Technologically, Henry invested in large cannon for his warships, an idea that had taken hold in other countries, to replace the smaller serpentines in use. He also flirted with designing ships personally. His contribution to larger vessels, if any, is unknown, but it is believed that he influenced the design of rowbarges and similar galleys. Henry was also responsible for the creation of a permanent navy, with the supporting anchorages and dockyards. Tactically, Henry's reign saw the first steps of the Navy moving from prioritising boarding tactics to emphasising gunnery instead. The Tudor navy was enlarged from seven ships to up to 50 (the Mary Rose among them), and Henry was responsible for the establishment of the "council for marine causes" to oversee the maintenance and operation of the Navy, becoming the basis for the later Admiralty.

=== Ireland ===
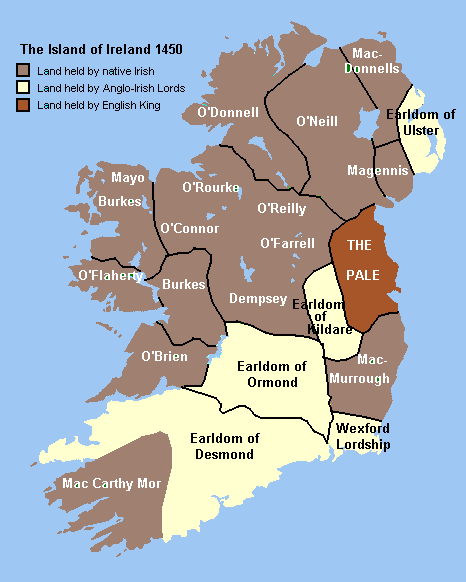
The division of Ireland in 1450

At the beginning of Henry's reign, Ireland was effectively divided into three zones: the Pale, where English rule was unchallenged; Leinster and Munster, the so-called "obedient land" of Anglo-Irish peers; and the Gaelic Connaught and Ulster, with merely nominal English rule. Until 1513, Henry continued the policy of his father, to allow Irish lords to rule in the King's name and accept steep divisions between the communities. However, upon the death of the Gerald FitzGerald, 8th Earl of Kildare, Lord Deputy of Ireland, fractious Irish politics combined with a more ambitious Henry to cause trouble. When Thomas Butler, 7th Earl of Ormond, died, Henry recognised one successor for Ormond's English, Welsh and Scottish lands, whilst in Ireland another took control. Kildare's successor, the 9th Earl, was replaced as Lord Deputy of Ireland by the Earl of Surrey in 1520. Surrey's ambitious aims were costly but ineffective; English rule became trapped between winning the Irish lords over with diplomacy, as favoured by Henry and Wolsey, and a sweeping military occupation as proposed by Surrey. Surrey was recalled in 1521, with Piers Butler – one of the claimants to the Earldom of Ormond – appointed in his place. Butler proved unable to control opposition, including that of Kildare. Kildare was appointed lord deputy in 1524, resuming his dispute with Butler, which had before been in a lull. Meanwhile, James FitzGerald, 10th Earl of Desmond, an Anglo-Irish peer, had turned his support to Richard de la Pole as pretender to the English throne; when in 1528 Kildare failed to take suitable actions against him, Kildare was once again removed from his post.

The Desmond situation was resolved on his death in 1529, which was followed by a period of uncertainty. This was effectively ended with the appointment of Henry FitzRoy, Duke of Richmond and Somerset and the King's son, as lord deputy. Richmond had never before visited Ireland, his appointment a break with past policy. For a time it looked as if peace might be restored with the return of Kildare to Ireland to manage the tribes, but the effect was limited and the Irish Parliament soon rendered ineffective. Ireland began to receive the attention of Cromwell, who had supporters of Ormond and Desmond promoted. Kildare, on the other hand, was summoned to London; after some hesitation, he departed for London in 1534, where he would face charges of treason. His son, Thomas, Lord Offaly, was more forthright, denouncing the King and leading a "Catholic crusade" against Henry, who was by this time mired in marital problems. Offaly had the Archbishop of Dublin, John Alen, murdered and besieged Dublin. Offaly led a mixture of Pale gentry and Irish tribes, although he failed to secure the support of Lord Darcy, a sympathiser, or Charles V. What was effectively a civil war was ended with the intervention of 2,000 English troops – a large army by Irish standards – and the execution of Offaly (his father was already dead) and his uncles.

Although the Offaly revolt was followed by a determination to rule Ireland more closely, Henry was wary of drawn-out conflict with the tribes, and a royal commission recommended that the only relationship with the tribes was to be promises of peace, their land protected from English expansion. The man to lead this effort was Antony St Leger, as Lord Deputy of Ireland, who would remain in post past Henry's death. Until the break with Rome, it was widely believed that Ireland was a Papal possession granted as a mere fiefdom to the English king, so in 1542 Henry asserted England's claim to the Kingdom of Ireland free from the Papal overlordship. This change did, however, also allow a policy of peaceful reconciliation and expansion: the Lords of Ireland would grant their lands to the King, before being returned as fiefdoms. The incentive to comply with Henry's request was an accompanying barony, and thus a right to sit in the Irish House of Lords, which was to run in parallel with England's. The Irish law of the tribes did not suit such an arrangement, because the chieftain did not have the required rights; this made progress tortuous, and the plan was abandoned in 1543, not to be replaced.

== Historiography ==
The complexities and sheer scale of Henry's legacy ensured that, in the words of Betteridge and Freeman, "throughout the centuries, Henry has been praised and reviled, but he has never been ignored". In the 1950s, historian John D. Mackie summed up Henry's personality and its impact on his achievements and popularity:

The respect, nay even the popularity, which he had from his people was not unmerited.... He kept the development of England in line with some of the most vigorous, though not the noblest forces of the day. His high courage – highest when things went ill – his commanding intellect, his appreciation of fact, and his instinct for rule carried his country through a perilous time of change, and his very arrogance saved his people from the wars which afflicted other lands. Dimly remembering the wars of the Roses, vaguely informed as to the slaughters and sufferings in Europe, the people of England knew that in Henry they had a great king.

A particular focus of modern historiography has been the extent to which the events of Henry's life (including his marriages, foreign policy and religious changes) were the result of his own initiative and, if they were, whether they were the result of opportunism or of a principled undertaking by Henry. The traditional interpretation of those events was provided by historian A. F. Pollard, who in 1902 presented his own, largely positive, view of the King, lauding him, "as the King and statesman who, whatever his personal failings, led England down the road to parliamentary democracy and empire". Pollard's interpretation remained the dominant interpretation of Henry's life until the publication of the doctoral thesis of Geoffrey Elton in 1953.

Elton's 1977 book on The Tudor Revolution in Government maintained Pollard's positive interpretation of the Henrician period as a whole, but reinterpreted Henry himself as a follower rather than a leader. For Elton, it was Cromwell and not Henry who undertook the changes in government – Henry was shrewd but lacked the vision to follow a complex plan through. Henry was little more, in other words, than an "ego-centric monstrosity" whose reign "owed its successes and virtues to better and greater men about him; most of its horrors and failures sprang more directly from [the King]".

Although the central tenets of Elton's thesis have since been questioned, it has consistently provided the starting point for much later work, including that of J. J. Scarisbrick, his student. Scarisbrick largely kept Elton's regard for Cromwell's abilities but returned agency to Henry, whom Scarisbrick considered to have ultimately directed and shaped policy. For Scarisbrick, Henry was a formidable, captivating man who "wore regality with a splendid conviction". The effect of endowing Henry with this ability, however, was largely negative in Scarisbrick's eyes: to Scarisbrick, the Henrician period was one of upheaval and destruction and those in charge worthy of blame more than praise. Even among more recent biographers, including David Loades, David Starkey, and John Guy, there has ultimately been little consensus on the extent to which Henry was responsible for the changes he oversaw or the assessment of those he did bring about.

This lack of clarity about Henry's control over events has contributed to the variation in the qualities ascribed to him: religious conservative or dangerous radical; lover of beauty or brutal destroyer of priceless artefacts; friend and patron or betrayer of those around him; chivalry incarnate or ruthless chauvinist. One traditional approach, favoured by Starkey and others, is to divide Henry's reign into two halves, the first Henry being dominated by positive qualities (politically inclusive, pious, athletic but also intellectual) who presided over a period of stability and calm, and the latter a "hulking tyrant" who presided over a period of dramatic, sometimes whimsical, change. Other writers have tried to merge Henry's disparate personality into a single whole; Lacey Baldwin Smith, for example, considered him an egotistical borderline neurotic given to great fits of temper and deep and dangerous suspicions, with a mechanical and conventional, but deeply held piety, and having at best a mediocre intellect.

== Style and arms ==
Henry originally used the style "Henry the Eighth, by the Grace of God, King of England, France and Lord of Ireland". In 1521, pursuant to Pope Leo X rewarding Henry for his Defence of the Seven Sacraments, the royal style became "Henry the Eighth, by the Grace of God, King of England and France, Defender of the Faith and Lord of Ireland". Following Henry's excommunication, Pope Paul III rescinded the grant of the title "Defender of the Faith", but an Act of Parliament (35 Hen. 8. c. 3) declared that it remained valid; and it continues in use to the present day. Henry's motto was "Coeur Loyal" ("true heart"), and he had this embroidered on his clothes in the form of a heart symbol and with the word "loyal". His emblem was the Tudor rose and the Beaufort portcullis. As king, Henry's arms were the same as those used by his predecessors since Henry IV: Quarterly, Azure three fleurs-de-lys Or (for France) and Gules three lions passant guardant in pale Or (for England).

In 1535, Henry added the "supremacy phrase" to the royal style, which became "Henry the Eighth, by the Grace of God, King of England and France, Defender of the Faith, Lord of Ireland and of the Church of England in Earth Supreme Head". In 1536, the phrase "of the Church of England" changed to "of the Church of England and also of Ireland". In 1541, the Irish council proposed to change the title "Lord of Ireland" to "King of Ireland" with the Crown of Ireland Act 1542. The meeting of the Irish Parliament that passed the act was the first meeting attended by many Gaelic Irish chieftains as well as Anglo-Irish aristocrats, and the bill was read in Irish, not English, in the upper house.

Coats of arms of Henry VIII of England
Two versions of Henry's coat of arms

== Genealogical tables ==
Ancestors of Henry VIII

8. Owen Tudor
4. Edmund Tudor, 1st Earl of Richmond
9. Catherine of Valois
2. Henry VII of England
10. John Beaufort, 1st Duke of Somerset
5. Margaret Beaufort
11. Margaret Beauchamp
1. Henry VIII of England
12. Richard Plantagenet, 3rd Duke of York
6. Edward IV of England
13. Cecily Neville
3. Elizabeth of York
14. Richard Woodville, 1st Earl Rivers
7. Elizabeth Woodville
15. Jacquetta of Luxembourg

Henry VIII's relatives (selective chart)

Richard, Duke of York
Edmund Tudor, Earl of Richmond	Margaret Beaufort	Edward IV	George Plantagenet, Duke of Clarence	Richard III	Elizabeth of York, Duchess of Suffolk	Margaret of York
Henry VII	Elizabeth of York	Edward V	Richard, Duke of York	Catherine of York	William Courtenay, Earl of Devon	Edward Plantagenet, Earl of Warwick	Margaret Pole, Countess of Salisbury	Richard Pole	John de la Pole, Earl of Lincoln	Edmund de la Pole, Duke of Suffolk	Richard de la Pole
Arthur, Prince of Wales	Catherine of Aragon	Henry VIII	other wives	Margaret Tudor	James IV of Scotland	Mary Tudor, Queen of France	Charles Brandon, Duke of Suffolk	Henry Courtenay, Marquess of Exeter	Henry Pole, Baron Montagu	Reginald Pole	Geoffrey Pole
Mary I	Elizabeth I	Edward VI	James V of Scotland	Frances Brandon	Henry Grey, Duke of Suffolk
Mary, Queen of Scots	Jane Grey	Catherine Grey	Mary Grey
James VI and I

== See also ==
- Cestui que – Concept in English law regarding beneficiaries
- Cultural depictions of Henry VIII – Overview of Henry VIII's portrayals in cultural media
- Family tree of English monarchs
- History of the foreign relations of the United Kingdom
- Inventory of Henry VIII – 16th-century list of possessions of the Crown
- List of English monarchs
- Mouldwarp – Ancient dialect word for a mole
- Tudor period – Period of English history (1485–1603) under the Tudor dynasty

== Bibliography ==
- Arnold, Thomas (2001). The Renaissance at War. London: Cassell and Company. ISBN 0-3043-5270-5.
- Ashrafian, Hutan (2011). "Henry VIII's Obesity Following Traumatic Brain Injury". Endocrine. 42 (1): 218–219. doi:10.1007/s12020-011-9581-z. PMID 22169966. S2CID 37447368.
- Bernard, G. W. (2005). The King's Reformation: Henry VIII and the Remaking of the English Church. Yale University Press. ISBN 978-0-3001-0908-5.
- Betteridge, Thomas (2005). "The Henrician Reformation and Mid-Tudor Culture". Journal of Medieval and Early Modern Studies. 35 (1): 91–109. doi:10.1215/10829636-35-1-91.
- ——; Freeman, Thomas S. (2012). Henry VIII in History. Ashgate Publishing, Ltd. ISBN 978-1-4094-6113-5.
- Brigden, Susan (2000). New Worlds, Lost Worlds. Penguin. ISBN 978-0-1401-4826-8.
- Chibi, Andrew A. (1997). "Richard Sampson, His Oratio, and Henry VIII's Royal Supremacy". Journal of Church and State. 39 (3): 543–560. doi:10.1093/jcs/39.3.543. ISSN 0021-969X.
- Churchill, Winston (1966). The New World. History of the English Speaking Peoples. Vol. 2. Cassell and Company.
- Crofton, Ian (2006). The Kings and Queens of England. Quercus Books. ISBN 978-1-8472-4141-2.
- Cruz, Anne J.; Suzuki, Mihoko (2009). The Rule of Women in Early Modern Europe. University of Illinois Press. ISBN 978-0-2520-7616-9.
- Davies, Jonathan (2005). "'We Do Fynde in Our Countre Great Lack of Bowes and Arrows': Tudor Military Archery and the Inventory of King Henry VIII". Journal of the Society for Army Historical Research. 83 (333): 11–29. ISSN 0037-9700.
- Elton, Geoffrey R. (1977). Reform and Reformation: England, 1509–1558. Edward Arnold. ISBN 0-7131-5952-9.
- Farquhar, Michael (2001). A Treasure of Royal Scandals. Penguin Books. ISBN 0-7394-2025-9.
- Fraser, Antonia (1994). The Wives of Henry VIII. Vintage Books. ISBN 978-0-6797-3001-9.
- Guicciardini, Francesco (1968) [1561]. Alexander, Sidney (ed.). The History of Italy. Princeton University Press. ISBN 978-0-6910-0800-4.
- Gunn, Steven (1991). "Tournaments and Early Tudor Chivalry". History Today. 41 (6): 543–560. ISSN 0018-2753.
- Guy, John (1997). The Tudor monarchy. Arnold Publishers. ISBN 978-0-3406-5219-0.
- —— (2000). The Tudors: a Very Short Introduction. Oxford University Press. ISBN 978-0-1916-0651-9.
- Hays, J. N. (2010). The Burdens of Disease: Epidemics and Human Response in Western History. Rutgers University Press. ISBN 978-0-8135-4613-1.
- Hart, Kelly (2009). The Mistresses of Henry VIII. The History Press. ISBN 978-0-7524-4835-0.
- Hall, Edward (1904) [1548]. Charles Whibley (ed.). The Triumphant Reign of Henry VIII. T.C. & E.C. Jack. OCLC 644934802.
- Haigh, Christopher (1993). English Reformations: Religion, Politics, and Society under the Tudors. Clarendon Press. ISBN 978-0-1982-2162-3.
- Hibbert, Christopher; Weinreb, Ben; Keay, Julia; Keay, John (2010). The London Encyclopaedia (3rd ed.). Macmillan. ISBN 978-1-4050-4925-2.
- Hutchinson, Robert (2012). Young Henry: The Rise of Henry VIII. Macmillan. ISBN 978-1-2500-1261-6.
- Ives, Eric (2005). The Life and Death of Anne Boleyn: 'The Most Happy'. Oxford: Blackwell Publishing. ISBN 978-1-4051-3463-7.
- —— (2006). "Will the Real Henry VIII Please Stand Up?". History Today. 56 (2): 28–36. ISSN 0018-2753.
- Lehmberg, Stanford E. (1970). The Reformation Parliament, 1529–1536. Cambridge University Press. ISBN 978-0-5210-7655-5.
- Lipscomb, Suzannah (2009). "Who was Henry?". History Today. 59 (4).
- Loades, David (2009). Henry VIII: Court, Church and Conflict. The National Archives. ISBN 978-1-9056-1542-1.
- Lydon, James (1998). The Making of Ireland: A History. London: Routledge. ISBN 978-0-4150-1347-5.
- Meyer, G. J. (2010). The Tudors: The Complete Story of England's Most Notorious Dynasty. Presidio Press. ISBN 978-0-3853-4076-2.
- Montefiore, Simon Sebag (2008). History's Monsters: 101 Villains from Vlad the Impaler to Adolf Hitler. Quercus Publishing Plc. ISBN 978-1-4351-0937-7.
- Morris, T.A. (1999). Tudor Government. Routledge. ISBN 978-0-2039-8167-2.
- Murphy, Neil (2016). "Violence, Colonization and Henry VIII's Conquest of France, 1544–1546". Past and Present (233): 13–51. doi:10.1093/pastj/gtw018.
- Pollard, A. F. (1905). Henry VIII. Longmans, Green & Company.
- Porter, Linda (2007). Mary Tudor: The First Queen (2009 ed.). London: Piatkus. ISBN 9780749909826.
- Rex, Richard (1996). "The Crisis of Obedience: God's Word and Henry's Reformation". The Historical Journal. 39 (4): 863–894. doi:10.1017/S0018246X00024687. JSTOR 2639860. S2CID 159649932.
- Rodger, N. A.M. (January 1996). "THE DEVELOPMENT OF BROADSIDE GUNNERY, 1450–1650". The Mariner's Mirror. 82 (3): 301–324. doi:10.1080/00253359.1996.10656604.
- Scarisbrick, J. J. (1968). Henry VIII. University of California Press. ISBN 978-0-5200-1130-4.
- Scarisbrick, J. J. (1997). Henry VIII (2nd ed.). Yale University Press. ISBN 0-3000-7158-2.
- Smith, Lacey Baldwin (1971). Henry VIII: the Mask of Royalty. Academy Chicago. ISBN 978-0-8973-3056-5.
- Spalding, Thomas Alfred (1894). The House of Lords. T. F. Unwin.
- Starkey, David (2003). Six Wives: The Queens of Henry VIII. Chatto & Windus. ISBN 978-0-7011-7298-5.
- —— (2008). Henry: Virtuous Prince. HarperCollins. ISBN 978-0-0072-8783-3.
- Stöber, Karen (2007). Late Medieval Monasteries and Their Patrons: England and Wales, c. 1300–1540. Boydell Press. ISBN 978-1-8438-3284-3.
- Thomas, Andrea (2005). Princelie Majestie: The Court of James V of Scotland 1528–1542. John Donald Publishers Ltd. ISBN 978-0-8597-6611-1.
- Thurley, Simon (1993). The Royal Palaces of Tudor England. Yale University Press. ISBN 978-0-3000-5420-0.
- Weir, Alison (1991). The Six Wives of Henry VIII. Grove Press. ISBN 0-8021-3683-4.
- —— (2002). Henry VIII: The King and His Court. Random House Digital, Inc. ISBN 0-3454-3708-X.
- Williams, James (2005). "Hunting and the Royal Image of Henry VIII". Sport in History. 25 (1): 41–59. doi:10.1080/17460260500073082. ISSN 1746-0263. S2CID 161663183.
- Williams, Neville (1971). Henry VIII and his Court. Macmillan Publishing Co. ISBN 978-0-0262-9100-2.

Henry VIII House of Tudor Born: 28 June 1491 Died: 28 January 1547
Regnal titles
Preceded by Henry VII	Lord of Ireland; 1509–1542	Crown of Ireland Act 1542
Preceded by Henry VII	King of England; 1509–1547	Succeeded by Edward VI
Vacant Title last held by Ruaidrí Ua Conchobair	King of Ireland; 1542–1547	Succeeded by Edward VI
Political offices
Preceded by William Scott	Lord Warden of the Cinque Ports; 1493–1509	Succeeded by Edward Poyning
Preceded by The Marquess of Berkeley	Earl Marshal; 1494–1509	Succeeded by The Duke of Norfolk
Peerage of England
Vacant Title last held by Arthur	Prince of Wales; 1504–1509	Vacant Title next held by Edward (VI)
Preceded by Arthur	Duke of Cornwall; 1502–1509	Vacant Title next held by Henry
