= Edwardian Reformation =

16th-century Protestantization in England

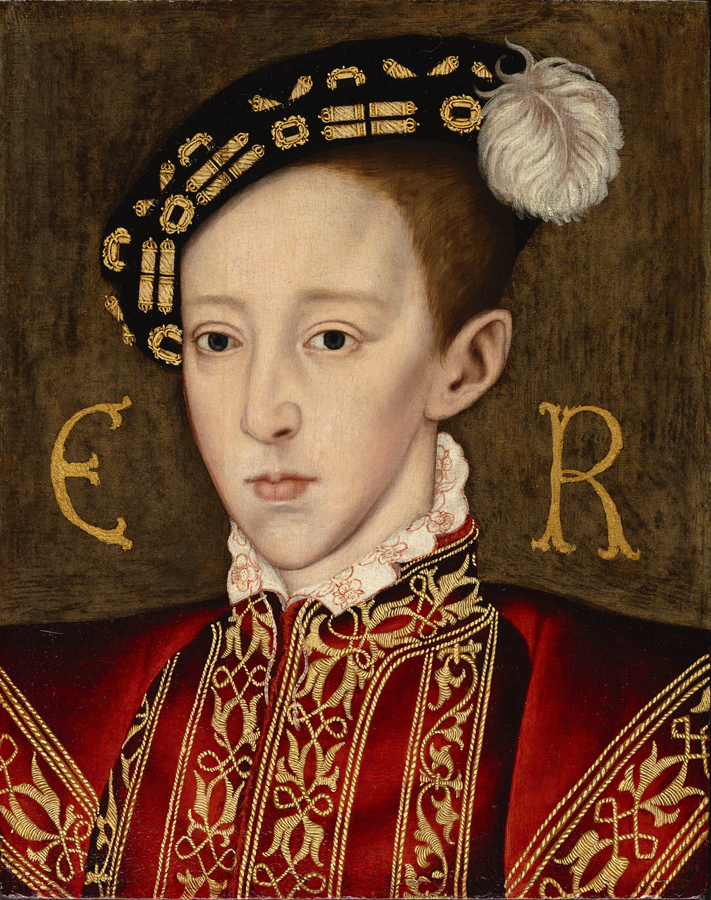
King Edward VI of England, in whose reign the reform of the English Church moved in a more Protestant direction

The Edwardian Reformation refers to the English Reformation during the reign of Edward VI (r. 1547–1553). Edward and his regents maintained the Church of England's separation from the Catholic Church begun by his father, Henry VIII. They also moved beyond the Henrician Reformation by officially imposing Protestant doctrine in England, Wales and the Irish Pale.

== Regency council ==
When Henry VIII died in 1547, his nine-year-old son, Edward VI, inherited the throne. Because Edward was given a Protestant humanist education, Protestants held high expectations and hoped he would be like Josiah, the biblical king of Judah who destroyed the altars and images of Baal. (Note: Marshall (2017, pp. 291, 304) lists among Edward's tutors the reformers John Cheke, Richard Cox and Roger Ascham.) During the seven years of Edward's reign, a Protestant establishment would gradually implement religious changes that were "designed to destroy one Church and build another, in a religious revolution of ruthless thoroughness".

Initially, however, Edward was of little account politically. Real power was in the hands of the regency council, which elected Edward Seymour, 1st Duke of Somerset, to be Lord Protector. The Protestant Somerset pursued reform hesitantly at first, partly because his powers were not unchallenged. The Six Articles remained the law of the land, and a proclamation was issued on 24 May reassuring the people against any "innovations and changes in religion".

Nevertheless, Seymour and Cranmer, the Archbishop of Canterbury did plan to further the reformation of religion. In July, a Book of Homilies was published, from which all clergy were to preach on Sundays. The homilies were explicitly Protestant in their content, condemning relics, images, rosary beads, holy water, palms, and other "papistical superstitions". It also directly contradicted the King's Book by teaching "we be justified by faith only, freely, and without works". Despite objections from Gardiner, the Bishop of Winchester, who questioned the legality of bypassing both Parliament and Convocation, justification by faith had been made a central teaching of the English Church.

== Iconoclasm and abolition of chantries ==
=== Royal injunctions ===
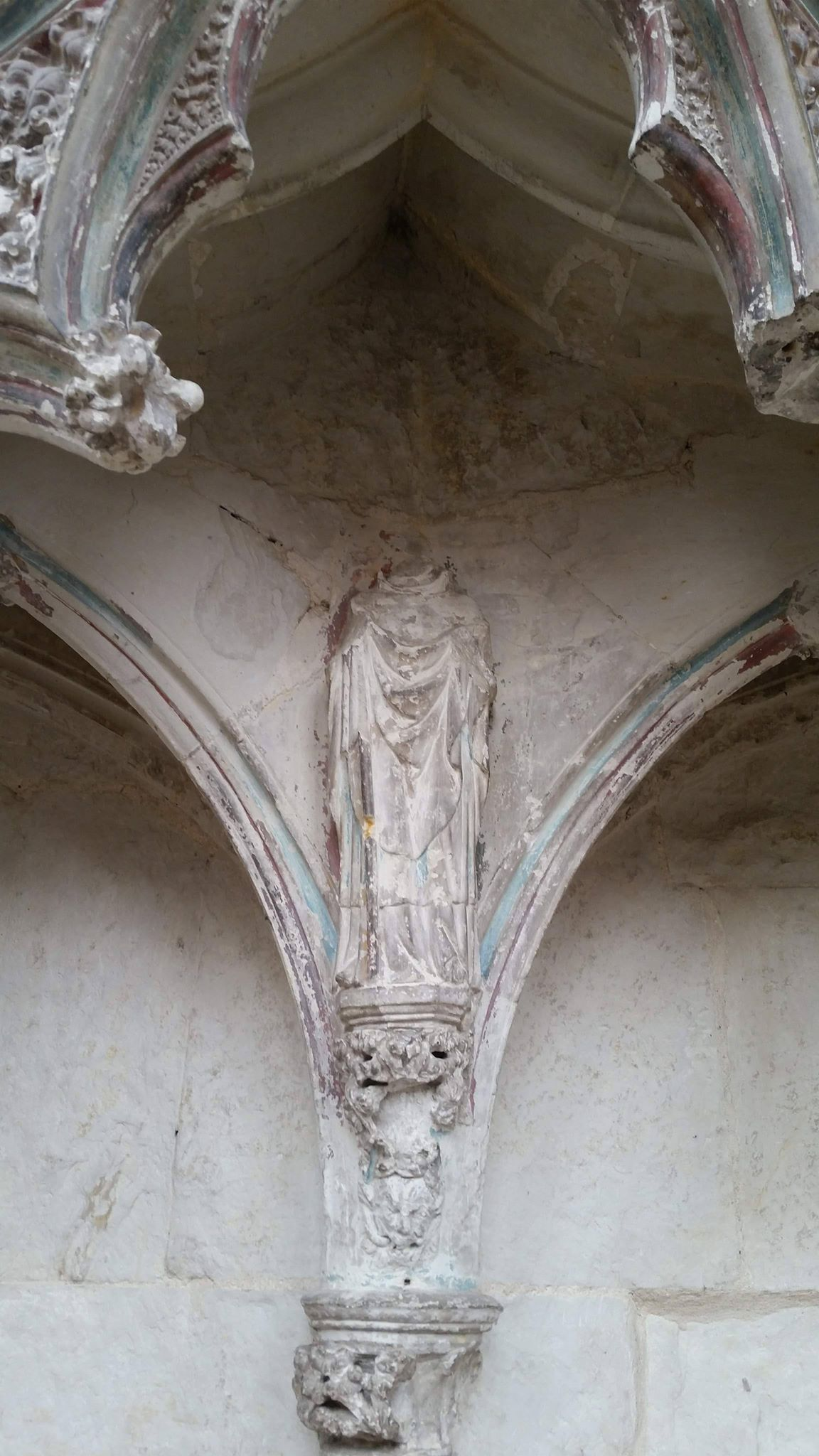
This statue in the Lady Chapel of Ely Cathedral was vandalized during the Reformation.

In August 1547, thirty commissioners—nearly all Protestants—were appointed to carry out a royal visitation of England's churches. The Royal Injunctions of 1547 issued to guide the commissioners were borrowed from Cromwell's 1538 injunctions but revised to be more radical. Historian Eamon Duffy calls them a "significant shift in the direction of full-blown Protestantism". Church processions—one of the most dramatic and public aspects of the traditional liturgy—were banned. The injunctions also attacked the use of sacramentals, such as holy water. It was emphasized that they imparted neither blessing nor healing but were only reminders of Christ. Lighting votive candles before saints' images had been forbidden in 1538, and the 1547 injunctions went further by outlawing those placed on the rood loft. Reciting the rosary was also condemned.

The injunctions set off a wave of iconoclasm in the autumn of 1547. While the injunctions only condemned images that were abused as objects of worship or devotion, the definition of abuse was broadened to justify the destruction of all images and relics. Stained glass, shrines, statues, and roods were defaced or destroyed. Church walls were whitewashed and covered with biblical texts condemning idolatry.

Conservative bishops Edmund Bonner and Gardiner protested the visitation, and both were arrested. Bonner spent nearly two weeks in the Fleet Prison before being released. Gardiner was sent to the Fleet Prison in September and remained there until January 1548. However, he continued to refuse to enforce the new religious policies and was arrested once again in June when he was sent to the Tower of London for the rest of Edward's reign.

There was sometimes only partial or strategic compliance by parishes. (Note: Duffy (2005, p. 481) reports that in Ludlow in Shropshire the parishioners complied with the orders to remove the rood and other images in 1547 but the same year spent money on making up the canopy to be carried over the Blessed Sacrament on the feast of Corpus Christi.) Some parishes took steps to conceal images and relics in order to rescue them from confiscation and destruction. Opposition to the removal of images was widespread—so much so that when during the Commonwealth, William Dowsing was commissioned to the task of image breaking in Suffolk, his task, as he records it, was enormous.

=== Parliamentary laws ===
When a new Parliament met in November 1547, it began to dismantle the laws passed during Henry VIII's reign to protect traditional religion. The Act of Six Articles was repealed—decriminalizing denial of the real, physical presence of Christ in the Eucharist. The old heresy laws were also repealed, allowing free debate on religious questions. In December, the Sacrament Act allowed the laity to receive communion under both kinds, the wine as well as the bread. This was opposed by conservatives but welcomed by Protestants.

The Chantries Act 1547 abolished the remaining chantries and confiscated their assets. Unlike the Chantry Act 1545, the 1547 act was intentionally designed to eliminate the last remaining institutions dedicated to praying for the dead. Confiscated wealth funded the Rough Wooing of Scotland.

Chantry priests had served parishes as auxiliary clergy and schoolmasters, and some communities were destroyed by the loss of the charitable and pastoral services of their chantries. In some places, chantry priests continued to say prayers and landowners to pay them to do so.

20th century historians disputed how well this was received in parishes. A. G. Dickens contended that people had "ceased to believe in intercessory masses for souls in purgatory", but Eamon Duffy argued that the demolition of chantry chapels and the removal of images coincided with the activity of royal visitors rather than being a significant grassroots movement in many locations.

== 1549 prayer book ==
=== Imposition of liturgical changes ===
The second year of Edward's reign was a turning point for the English Reformation; many people identified the year 1548, rather than the 1530s, as the beginning of the English Church's schism from the Catholic Church. On 18 January 1548, the Privy Council abolished the use of candles on Candlemas, ashes on Ash Wednesday and palms on Palm Sunday. On 21 February, the council explicitly ordered the removal of all church images.

On 8 March, a royal proclamation announced a more significant change—the first major reform of the Mass and of the Church of England's official eucharistic theology. The "Order of the Communion" was a series of English exhortations and prayers that reflected Protestant theology and were inserted into the Latin Mass. A significant departure from tradition was that individual confession to a priest—long a requirement before receiving the Eucharist—was made optional and replaced with a general confession said by the congregation as a whole. The effect on religious custom was profound as a majority of laypeople, not just Protestants, most likely ceased confessing their sins to their priests. By 1548, Cranmer and other leading Protestants had moved from the Lutheran to the Reformed position on the Eucharist. Significant to Cranmer's change of mind was the influence of Strasbourg theologian Martin Bucer. This shift can be seen in the Communion order's teaching on the Eucharist. Laypeople were instructed that when receiving the sacrament they "spiritually eat the flesh of Christ", an attack on the belief in the real, bodily presence of Christ in the Eucharist. The Communion order was incorporated into the new prayer book largely unchanged.

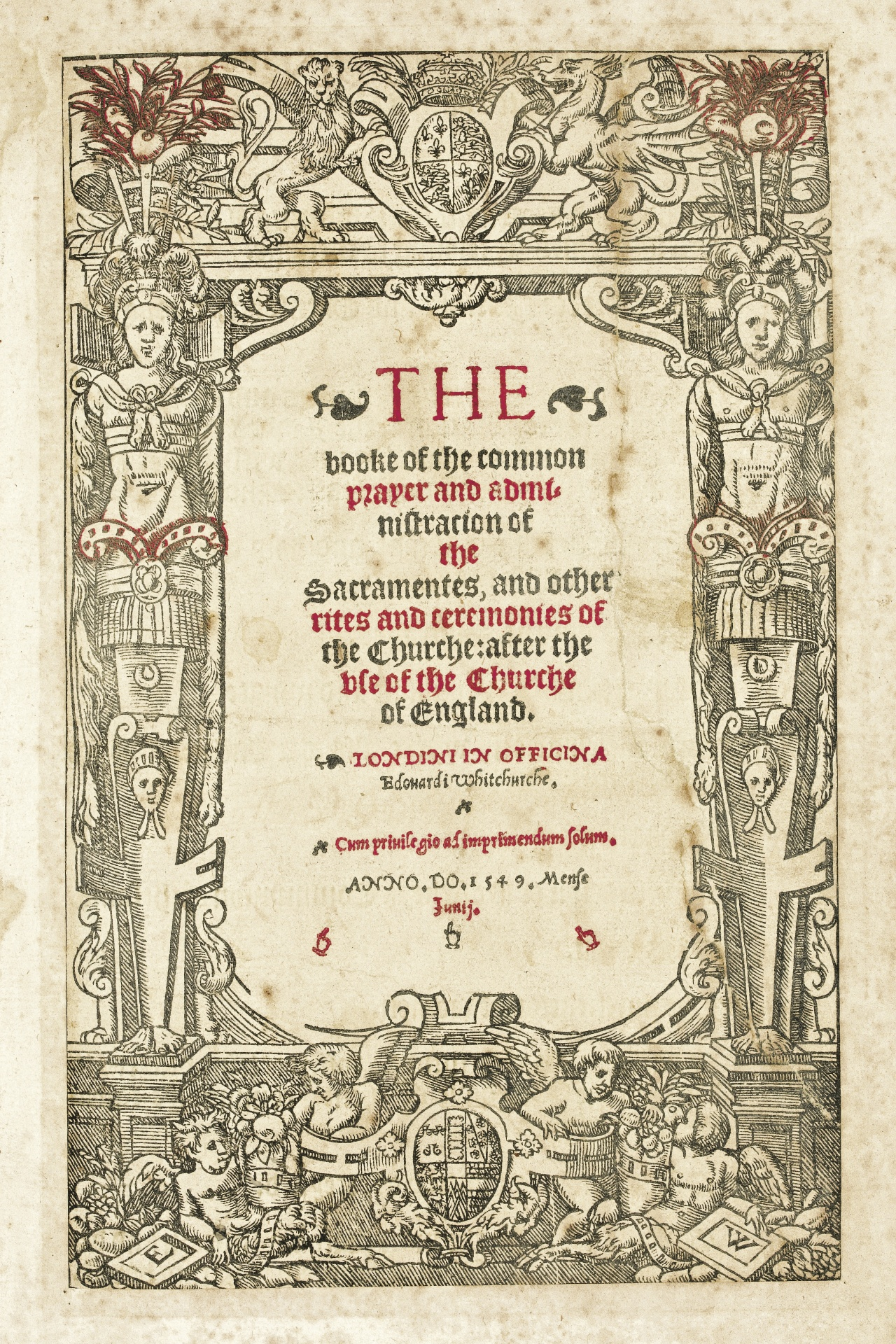
Title page of the 1549 Book of Common Prayer

That prayer book and liturgy, the Book of Common Prayer, was authorized by the Act of Uniformity 1549. It replaced the several regional Latin rites then in use, such as the Use of Sarum, the Use of York and the Use of Hereford with an English-language liturgy. Authored by Cranmer, this first prayer book was a temporary compromise with conservatives. It provided Protestants with a service free from what they considered superstition, while maintaining the traditional structure of the mass.

The cycles and seasons of the church year continued to be observed, and there were texts for daily Matins (Morning Prayer), Mass and Evensong (Evening Prayer). In addition, there was a calendar of saints' feasts with collects and scripture readings appropriate for the day. Priests still wore vestments—the prayer book recommended the cope rather than the chasuble. Many of the services were little changed. Baptism kept a strongly sacramental character, including the blessing of water in the baptismal font, promises made by godparents, making the sign of the cross on the child's forehead, and wrapping it in a white chrism cloth. The confirmation and marriage services followed the Sarum rite. There were also remnants of prayer for the dead and the Requiem Mass, such as the provision for celebrating holy communion at a funeral.

Nevertheless, the first Book of Common Prayer was a "radical" departure from traditional worship in that it "eliminated almost everything that had till then been central to lay Eucharistic piety". Communion took place without any elevation of the consecrated bread and wine. The elevation had been the central moment of the old liturgy, attached as it was to the idea of real presence. In addition, the prayer of consecration was changed to reflect Protestant theology. Three sacrifices were mentioned; the first was Christ's sacrifice on the cross. The second was the congregation's sacrifice of praise and thanksgiving, and the third was the offering of "ourselves, our souls and bodies, to be a reasonable, holy and lively sacrifice" to God. While the medieval Canon of the Mass "explicitly identified the priest's action at the altar with the sacrifice of Christ", the Prayer Book broke this connection by stating the church's offering of thanksgiving in the Eucharist was not the same as Christ's sacrifice on the cross. Instead of the priest offering the sacrifice of Christ to God the Father, the assembled offered their praises and thanksgivings. The Eucharist was now to be understood as merely a means of partaking in and receiving the benefits of Christ's sacrifice.

There were other departures from tradition. At least initially, there was no music because it would take time to replace the church's body of Latin music. Most of the liturgical year was simply "bulldozed away" with only the major feasts of Christmas, Easter and Whitsun along with a few biblical saints' days (Apostles, Evangelists, John the Baptist and Mary Magdalene) and only two Marian feast days (the Purification and the Annunciation). The Assumption, Corpus Christi and other festivals were gone.

In 1549, Parliament also legalized clerical marriage, something already practised by some Protestants (including Cranmer) but considered an abomination by conservatives.

== Rebellion ==
Enforcement of the new liturgy did not always take place without a struggle. In the West Country, the introduction of the Book of Common Prayer was the catalyst for a series of uprisings through the summer of 1549. There were smaller upheavals elsewhere from the West Midlands to Yorkshire. The Prayer Book Rebellion was not only in reaction to the prayer book; the rebels demanded a full restoration of pre-Reformation Catholicism.

Rebellions were also fed by other privatizations of communal property, by what has been called the "Tudor kleptocracy": notably the enclosure of fields, which were previously common land traditionally used by farmers and peasants, by local manor-lords, often to allow larger flocks of sheep. In East Anglia, Kett's Rebellion in Norwich blended reform of benefices (as demanded strongly by some current Protestant reformers and unsuccessfully by previous Catholic reformers) and with demands for economic reforms and social justice. It was not explicitly Catholic, and sometimes regarded as semi-Protestant, but occurred immediately after a celebration of a town play about the defiant St Thomas Becket.

The insurrections were put down only after considerable loss of life: in the Prayer Book Rebellion, up to 5,000 Catholic men were killed, including 900 prisoners in a massacre.

Somerset was blamed for the rebellions and was removed from power in October. It was prematurely believed by both conservatives and reformers that the Reformation would be overturned. Succeeding Somerset as de facto regent was John Dudley, 1st Earl of Warwick, newly appointed Lord President of the Privy Council. Warwick saw further implementation of the reforming policy as a means of gaining Protestant support and defeating his conservative rivals.

== Further reform ==
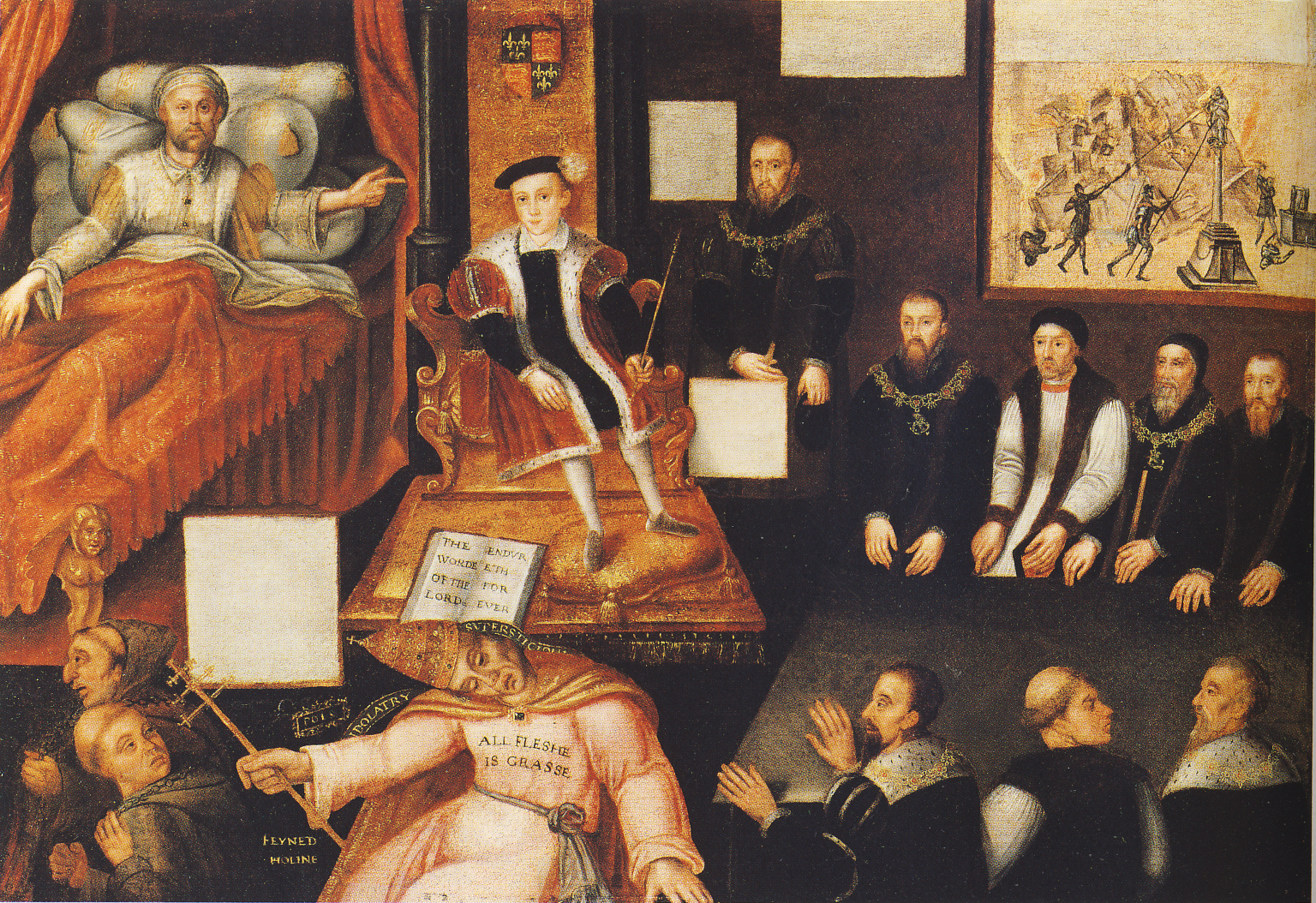
Edward VI and the Pope: An Allegory of the Reformation. This Elizabethan work of propaganda depicts the handing over of power from Henry VIII, who lies dying in bed, to Edward VI, seated beneath a cloth of state with a slumping pope at his feet. In the top right of the picture is an image of men pulling down and smashing idols. At Edward's side are his uncle the Lord Protector Edward Seymour and members of the Privy Council.

From that point on, the Reformation proceeded apace. Since the 1530s, one of the obstacles to Protestant reform had been the bishops, bitterly divided between a traditionalist majority and a Protestant minority. This obstacle was removed in 1550–1551 when the episcopate was purged of conservatives. Edmund Bonner of London, William Rugg of Norwich, Nicholas Heath of Worcester, John Vesey of Exeter, Cuthbert Tunstall of Durham, George Day of Chichester and Stephen Gardiner of Winchester were either deprived of their bishoprics or forced to resign. Thomas Thirlby, Bishop of Westminster, managed to stay a bishop only by being translated to the Diocese of Norwich, "where he did virtually nothing during his episcopate". Traditionalist bishops were briefly replaced by Protestants such as Nicholas Ridley, John Ponet, John Hooper and Miles Coverdale.

The newly enlarged and emboldened Protestant episcopate turned its attention to ending efforts by conservative clergy to "counterfeit the popish mass" through loopholes in the 1549 prayer book. The Book of Common Prayer was composed during a time when it was necessary to grant compromises and concessions to traditionalists. This was taken advantage of by conservative priests who made the new liturgy as much like the old one as possible, including elevating the Eucharist. The conservative Bishop Gardiner endorsed the prayer book while in prison, and historian Eamon Duffy notes that many lay people treated the prayer book "as an English missal".

To attack the mass, Protestants began demanding the removal of stone altars. Bishop Ridley launched the campaign in May 1550 when he commanded all altars to be replaced with wooden communion tables in his London diocese. Other bishops throughout the country followed his example, but there was also resistance. In November 1550, the Privy Council ordered the removal of all altars in an effort to end all dispute. While the prayer book used the term "altar", Protestants preferred a table because at the Last Supper Christ instituted the sacrament at a table. The removal of altars was also an attempt to destroy the idea that the Eucharist was Christ's sacrifice. During Lent in 1550, John Hooper preached, "as long as the altars remain, both the ignorant people, and the ignorant and evil-persuaded priest, will dream always of sacrifice".

In March 1550, a new ordinal was published that was based on Martin Bucer's own treatise on the form of ordination. While Bucer had provided for only one service for all three orders of clergy, the English ordinal was more conservative and had separate services for deacons, priests and bishops.

During his consecration as bishop of Gloucester, John Hooper objected to the mention of "all saints and the holy Evangelist" in the Oath of Supremacy and to the requirement that he wear a black chimere over a white rochet. Hooper was excused from invoking the saints in his oath, but he would ultimately be convinced to wear the offensive consecration garb. This was the first battle in the vestments controversy, which was essentially a conflict over whether the church could require people (in particular, deacons, priests and bishops) to observe ceremonies that were neither necessary for salvation nor prohibited by scripture. When the issue re-arose in Elizabethan times, more than one third of London priests were suspended pending sacking, such was the disunity.

== 1552 prayer book and parish confiscations ==
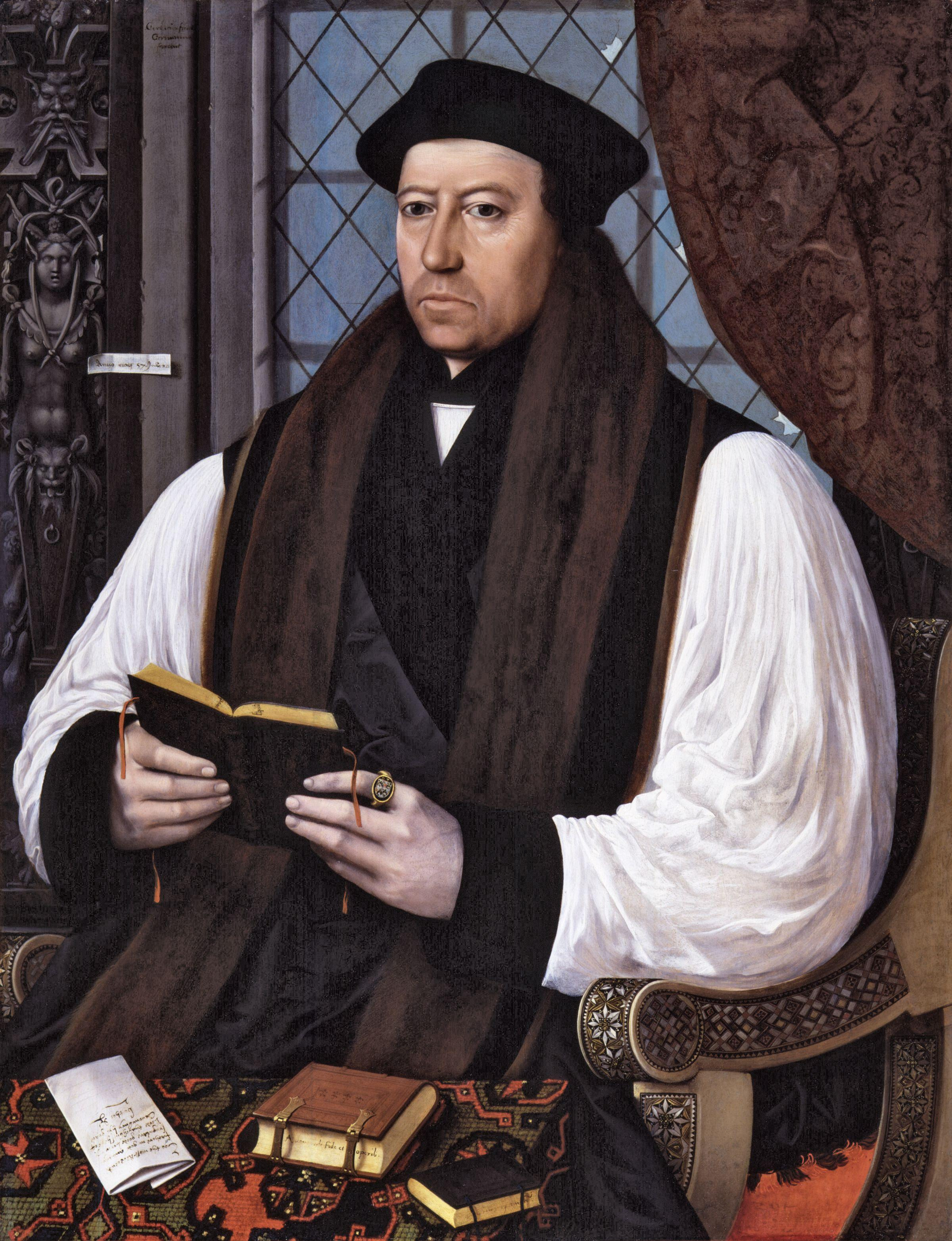
Thomas Cranmer (1489–1556), Henry VIII's Archbishop of Canterbury and editor and co-author of the first and second Books of Common Prayer.

The 1549 Book of Common Prayer was criticized by Protestants both in England and abroad for being too susceptible to Catholic re-interpretation. Martin Bucer identified 60 problems with the prayer book, and the Italian Peter Martyr Vermigli provided his own complaints. Shifts in Eucharistic theology between 1548 and 1552 also made the prayer book unsatisfactory—during that time English Protestants achieved a consensus rejecting any real bodily presence of Christ in the Eucharist. Some influential Protestants such as Vermigli defended Zwingli's symbolic view of the Eucharist. Less radical Protestants such as Bucer and Cranmer advocated for a spiritual presence in the sacrament. Cranmer himself had already adopted receptionist views on the Lord's Supper. (Note: MacCulloch (1996, pp. 461, 492) quotes Cranmer as explaining "And therefore in the book of the holy communion, we do not pray that the creatures of bread and wine may be the body and blood of Christ; but that they may be to us the body and blood of Christ" and also "I do as plainly speak as I can, that Christ's body and blood be given to us in deed, yet not corporally and carnally, but spiritually and effectually.") In April 1552, a new Act of Uniformity authorized a revised Book of Common Prayer to be used in worship by November 1.

This new prayer book removed many of the traditional elements in the 1549 prayer book, resulting in a more Protestant liturgy. The communion service was designed to remove any hint of consecration or change in the bread and wine. Instead of unleavened wafers, ordinary bread was to be used. The prayer of invocation was removed, and the minister no longer said "the body of Christ" when delivering communion. Rather, he said, "Take and eat this, in remembrance that Christ died for thee, and feed on him in thy heart by faith, with thanksgiving". Christ's presence in the Lord's Supper was a spiritual presence "limited to the subjective experience of the communicant". Anglican bishop and scholar Colin Buchanan interprets the prayer book to teach that "the only point where the bread and wine signify the body and blood is at reception". Rather than reserving the sacrament (which often led to Eucharistic adoration), any leftover bread or wine was to be taken home by the curate for ordinary consumption.

In the new prayer book, the last vestiges of prayers for the dead were removed from the funeral service. Unlike the 1549 version, the 1552 prayer book removed many traditional sacramentals and observances that reflected belief in the blessing and exorcism of people and objects. In the baptism service, infants no longer received minor exorcism and the white chrisom robe. Anointing was no longer included in the services for baptism, ordination and visitation of the sick. These ceremonies were altered to emphasise the importance of faith, rather than trusting in rituals or objects. Clerical vestments were simplified—ministers were only allowed to wear the surplice and bishops had to wear a rochet.

Throughout Edward's reign, inventories of parish valuables, ostensibly for preventing embezzlement, convinced many the government planned to seize parish property, just as was done to the chantries. These fears were confirmed in March 1551 when the Privy Council ordered the confiscation of church plate and vestments "for as much as the King's Majestie had neede [sic] presently of a mass of money". No action was taken until 1552–1553 when commissioners were appointed. They were instructed to leave only the "bare essentials" required by the 1552 Book of Common Prayer—a surplice, tablecloths, communion cup and a bell. Items to be seized included copes, chalices, chrismatories, patens, monstrances and candlesticks. Rich cloth of gold fabrics were collected and sent to Arthur Stourton at the Royal Wardrobe. Many parishes sold their valuables rather than have them confiscated at a later date. The money funded parish projects that could not be challenged by royal authorities. (Note: Among many examples provided by Duffy (2005, pp. 484–485): in Haddenham, Cambridgeshire, a chalice, paten and processional cross were sold and the proceeds devoted to flood defences; in the wealthy Rayleigh parish, £10 worth of plate was sold to pay for the cost of the required reforms—the need to buy a parish chest, Bible and communion table.) In many parishes, items were concealed or given to local gentry who had, in fact, lent them to the church. (Note: Duffy (2005, p. 490) writes that at Long Melford a church patron named Sir John Clopton bought up many of the images, probably to preserve them.)

The confiscations caused tensions between Protestant church leaders and Warwick, now Duke of Northumberland. Cranmer, Ridley and other Protestant leaders did not fully trust Northumberland. Northumberland in turn sought to undermine these bishops by promoting their critics, such as Jan Laski and John Knox. Cranmer's plan for a revision of English canon law, the Reformatio legum ecclesiasticarum, failed in Parliament due to Northumberland's opposition. Despite such tensions, a new doctrinal statement to replace the King's Book was issued on royal authority in May 1553. The Forty-two Articles reflected the Reformed theology and practice taking shape during Edward's reign, which historian Christopher Haigh describes as a "restrained Calvinism". It affirmed predestination and that the King of England was Supreme Head of the Church of England under Christ.

== Edward's succession ==
King Edward became seriously ill in February and died in July 1553. Before his death, Edward was concerned that Mary, his devoutly Catholic sister, would overturn his religious reforms. A new plan of succession was created in which both of Edward's sisters Mary and Elizabeth were bypassed on account of illegitimacy in favour of the Protestant Jane Grey, the granddaughter of Edward's aunt Mary Tudor and daughter in law of the Duke of Northumberland. This new succession violated the Third Succession Act of 1543 and was widely seen as an attempt by Northumberland to stay in power. Northumberland was unpopular due to the church confiscations, and support for Jane collapsed. On 19 July, the Privy Council proclaimed Mary queen to the acclamation of the crowds in London.

== Bibliography ==
- Aston, Margaret (1993). The King's Bedpost: Reformation and Iconography in a Tudor Group Portrait. Cambridge University Press. ISBN 9780521484572.
- Brigden, Susan (2000), New Worlds, Lost Worlds: The Rule of the Tudors, 1485–1603, London: Allen Lane/Penguin, ISBN 0-7139-9067-8
- Dickens, A. G. (1989). The English Reformation (2nd ed.). London: BT Batsford.
- Duffy, Eamon (2005). The Stripping of the Altars: Traditional Religion in England, c. 1400 – c. 1580 (2nd ed.). Yale University Press. ISBN 978-0-300-10828-6.
- Graham-Dixon, Andrew (1996). A History of British Art. University of California Press. ISBN 978-0-520-22376-9.
- Haigh, Christopher (1993). English Reformations: Religion, Politics, and Society Under the Tudors. Oxford University Press. ISBN 978-0-19-822162-3.
- Hearn, Karen (1995). Dynasties: Painting in Tudor and Jacobean England, 1530–1630. Tate Publishing. ISBN 9781854371577.
- Jones, Cheslyn; Wainwright, Geoffrey; Yarnold, Edward; Bradshaw, Paul, eds. (1992). The Study of Liturgy (revised ed.). SPCK. ISBN 978-0-19-520922-8.
- Loach, Jennifer (1999). Edward VI. Yale English Monarchs. Yale University Press. ISBN 9780300094091.
- MacCulloch, Diarmaid (1996). Thomas Cranmer: A Life (revised ed.). London: Yale University Press. ISBN 9780300226577.
- —— (1999). The Boy King: Edward VI and the Protestant Reformation. University of California Press. ISBN 978-0520234024.
- Marshall, Peter (2017). Heretics and Believers: A History of the English Reformation. Yale University Press. ISBN 978-0300170627.
- Moorman, John R. H. (1983). The Anglican Spiritual Tradition. Darton, Longman and Todd. ISBN 978-0-87243-125-6.
- Thompson, Bard (1961). Liturgies of the Western Church. Meridian Books. ISBN 0-529-02077-7.
