= Marriage vows =

Promises each partner in a couple makes to the other during a wedding ceremony

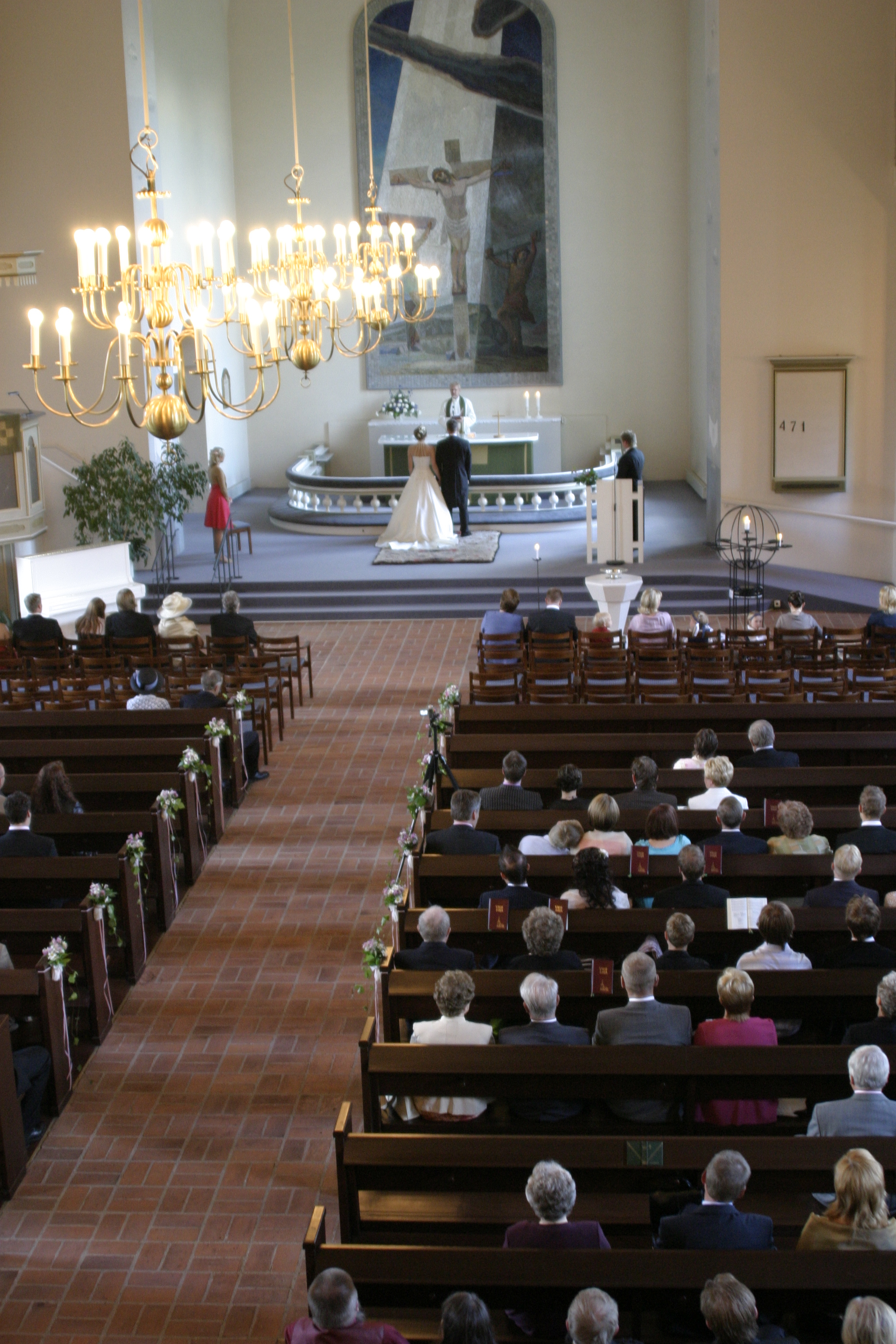
Wedding ceremony at Kiuruvesi Church in Kiuruvesi, Finland, July 2007

Marriage vows are promises each partner in a couple makes to the other during a wedding ceremony based upon Western Christian norms. They are not universal to marriage and not necessary in most legal jurisdictions. They are not even universal within Christian marriage, as Eastern Christians do not have marriage vows in their traditional wedding ceremonies.

== Background ==
The oldest traditional wedding vows can be traced back to the manuals of the medieval church. In England, there were manuals of the dioceses of Salisbury (Sarum) and York. The compilers of the first Book of Common Prayer, published in 1549, based its marriage service mainly on the Sarum manual. Upon agreement to marry, the Church of England usually offered couples a choice. The couple could promise each other to "love and cherish" or, alternatively, the groom promises to "love, cherish, and worship", and the bride to "love, cherish, and obey".

== Western Christianity ==
=== Roman Catholic ===
Couples wedding in the Latin Church of the Catholic Church essentially make the same pledge to one another. According to The Order of Celebrating Matrimony, one of the customary texts in English is:

I, ____, take you, ____, to be my (husband/wife). I promise to be faithful to you, in good times and in bad, in sickness and in health. I will love you and honour you all the days of my life.

In the United States, Catholic wedding vows may also take the following form:

I, ____, take you, ____, to be my lawful (husband/wife), to have and to hold, from this day forward, for better, for worse, for richer, for poorer, in sickness and in health, until death do us part.

The priest will then say aloud "You have declared your consent before the Church. May the Lord in his goodness strengthen your consent and fill you both with his blessings. What God has joined, men must not divide. Amen."

Historically, in the Sarum Rite of the Catholic Church, vow of the wife reads as follows:

N. Vis habere hunc uirum in sponsum et illi obedire et servire et eum diligere et honorare ac custodire sanum et infirmum sicut sponsa debet sponsum, etc.

In English, the bride says:

Ich .N. take the .N. to my weddyd housbonde to hau and to holden fro this day forward, for bettere, for wers, for richere for porere, in seknesse and in helthe to be boneyre and buxsum in bedde and at borde, tyl deth us departe, zif holi cherche hit wyle ordeyne and there to y plight the my treuthe.

=== Lutheran ===
The wedding vows used in the Lutheran churches are as follows:

I, [name],
take you, [name of bride/groom],
to be my wedded [wife/husband],
to have and to hold from this day forward,
for better, for worse,
for richer, for poorer,
in sickness and in health,
to love and to cherish,
till death us do part,
according to God's holy will;
and I pledge to you my faithfulness.

=== Anglican ===
The law in England authorizes marriages to be legal if properly carried out and registered in the Church of England and some other religious bodies (e.g. Jewish, Quakers): other men and women who wish to marry can be married by a local official authorized to do so (civil ceremony). Circumstances may result in the same partners having both ceremonies at different times, though this is rare. The vows, presence of witnesses, and civil registration are absolute requirements under the law.

Civil ceremonies often allow couples to choose their own marriage vows, although many civil marriage vows are adapted from the traditional vows, taken from the Book of Common Prayer, "To have and to hold from this day forward, for better for worse, for richer for poorer, in sickness and in health, to love and to cherish, till death us do part."

They were first published in English in the prayer book of 1549, based on earlier Latin texts (the Sarum and York Rituals of the medieval period). An older version of the final phrase is "until death us depart" where "depart" means "separate". "Until death us depart" had to be changed due to changes in the usage of "depart" in the Prayer Book of 1662. In the 1928 prayer book (not authorized) and in editions of the 1662 prayer book printed thereafter "obey" was retained (in the 1928 book an alternative version omitted this). The 1928 revised form of Matrimony was quite widely adopted, though the form of 1662 was also widely used, though less so after the introduction of the Alternative Service Book.

The original wedding vows, as printed in the Book of Common Prayer, are:

Groom: I,____, take thee,_____, to be my wedded Wife, to have and to hold from this day forward, for better for worse, for richer for poorer, in sickness and in health, to love and to cherish, till death us do part, according to God's holy ordinance; and thereto I plight thee my troth.

Bride: I,_____, take thee,_____, to be my wedded Husband, to have and to hold from this day forward, for better for worse, for richer for poorer, in sickness and in health, to love, cherish, and to obey, till death us do part, according to God's holy ordinance; and thereto I give thee my troth.

Then, as the groom places the ring on the bride's finger, he says the following:

With this Ring I thee wed, with my body I thee worship, and with all my worldly goods I thee endow: In the name of the Father, and of the Son, and of the Holy Ghost. Amen.

In the Alternative Service Book (1980) two versions of the vows are included: the bride and groom must select one of the versions only. Version A:

I, ____, take you, ____, to be my wife (or husband), to have and to hold from this day forward, for better, for worse, for richer, for poorer, in sickness and in health, to love and to cherish, till death us do part, according to God's holy law, and this is my solemn vow.

Version B is identical except for the clause "to love and to cherish" where the groom says "to love, cherish, and worship" and the bride says "to love, cherish, and obey".

Since 2000 the service in Common Worship the normal vows are as follows:

I, N, take you, N, to be my wife (or husband), to have and to hold from this day forward, for better, for worse, for richer, for poorer, in sickness and in health, to love and to cherish, till death us do part, according to God's holy law, in the presence of God I make this vow.

However, the bride and groom may choose to replace the clause "to love and to cherish" with "to love, cherish, and obey" when the bride makes her vows.

On September 12, 1922, the Episcopal Church voted to remove the word "obey" from the bride's section of wedding vows. Other churches of the Anglican Communion each have their own authorized prayer books which in general follow the vows described above though the details and languages used do vary.

=== Quaker ===
In the United Kingdom, since the first law regulating marriage (the Marriage Act 1753), the state recognises marriages conducted by the Society of Friends (Quakers), Jews, and the Church of England.

The declarations made in Quaker marriage were first set down in a London Yearly Meeting minute in 1675 as such:

Man: Friends, in the fear of the Lord, and before this assembly, I take my friend AB to be my wife, promising, through divine assistance, to be unto her a loving and faithful husband, until it shall please the Lord by death to separate us.

Woman: Friends, in the fear of the Lord, and before this assembly, I take my friend CD to be my husband, promising, through divine assistance, to be unto him a loving and faithful wife, until it shall please the Lord by death to separate us.

The procedure is restated in a minute of London Yearly Meeting of 1754, and the declarations remained the same until the twentieth century. In July 1922, the Committee on the Marriage Declaration was set up, and this reported to London Yearly Meeting in 1923, and after reference to a further committee the final phrase was changed to as long as we both on earth shall live; although the option of until it shall please the Lord by death to separate us remained as an alternative.

The current declarations allowed in Britain Yearly Meeting is:

Friends, I take this my friend [name] to be my spouse, promising, through divine assistance, to be unto him/her a loving and faithful spouse, so long as we both on earth shall live.

The following alternatives are currently allowed:

- The declaration may be prefaced by In the presence of God
- The declaration may be prefaced by In the fear of the Lord and in the presence of this assembly
- The word spouse may be replaced by wife or husband as appropriate or by partner in marriage
- The phrase through divine assistance may be replaced by the words with God's help
- The phrase so long as we both on earth shall live may be replaced by the words until it shall please the Lord by death to separate us
- The declaration may be made in Welsh in "places where the Welsh tongue is used"

== Hindu marriage vows ==
The Saptapadi, meaning "seven steps", is the most crucial rite in a Hindu wedding where the couple takes seven circles around a sacred fire, with each round representing a vow for their life together. This ceremony solidifies their commitment and is considered the completion of the marriage.

These vows which may be spoken aloud are divided into seven (7) categories:

1. Nourishment: The couple vows to nourish and provide for each other, promising to take care of their family's basic needs and create a supportive home.

2. Strength: They promise to grow together in strength and build physical, spiritual, and mental strength together and face life's challenges as a united front.

3. Prosperity: This vow involves a commitment to work together to preserve and increase their wealth and manage their resources wisely through honest means.

4. Harmony and happiness: This vow focuses on peace, harmony, and the well-being of both partners, as well as the commitment to care for each other's happiness and be there for each other through both joy and sorrow.

5. Family and offspring: The couple vows to love and respect each other, their families, and to raise their children with strong values and virtues.

6. Health and longevity: The couple pledges to live long and healthy lives with each other and the world around them, while promising to be loyal and faithful companions.

7. Friendship and lifelong companionship: The final vow is a promise of an eternal bond. The couple vows to be lifelong friends and partners, remaining committed and devoted to each other for eternity.

== Civil marriage ==
=== England and Wales ===
Whilst couples may add to these, under the Marriage Act 1949, all civil marriage in England and Wales, and marriage by an authorised person (this includes religious marriage not carried out by the Anglican church, Jewish or Society of Friends (Quakers)), must include the following declaration and contracting words:

I do solemnly declare that I know not of any lawful impediment why I ____ may not be joined in matrimony to ____.

I call upon these persons here present to witness that I ____ do take thee ____ to be my lawfully wedded wife/husband.

The Marriage Ceremony (Prescribed Words) Act 1996 allowed an alternative declaration of either:

I declare that I know of no legal reason why I ____ may not be joined in marriage to ____.

Registrar/Minister: Are you ____ free lawfully to marry ____
Man/Woman: I am.

and an alternative of the contracting words of:

I ____ take you/thee ____ to be my wedded wife/husband.

== History ==
The wedding vows as practised in most English-speaking countries derive ultimately from the Sarum rite of mediaeval England. The first part of the vows of the Sarum rite is given in Latin, but is instructed to be said by the priest "in linguam materna", i.e. in the "mother tongue" of those present. The vows of the first English prayer book of 1549 mostly correspond to those of the Sarum rite.

| | To the man | To the woman | Man | Woman |
|---|---|---|---|---|
| Sarum | Vis habere hanc mulierem in sponsam et eam diligere et honorare, tenere et custodire, sanam et infirmam, et sicut sponsus debet sponsam: et omnes alias propter eam dimittere et illi soli adhaerere, quamdiu vita utriusque duraverit? | Vis habere hunc virum in sponsum, et illi obedire et servire, et eum diligere et honorare, ac custodire sanum et infirmum, et sicut sponsa debet sponsum: et omnes alios propter eum dimittere, et illi soli adhaerere, quamdiu vita utriusque vestrum duraverit? | I N. take the N. to my weddyd wyf, to have and to hold fro thys day forwarde, for better for wors, for richer for porer, in sikenesse and in helthe, tyl deth us departe, yf holy Chyrche wyl it ordeyne; and thereto I plyght the my trouthe. | I N. take the N. to my weddyd husbonde, to have and to hold fro thys day forwarde, for better for wurs, for richere, for porer, in sikenesse and in helthe, to be bonoure and buxum in bed and at bord, tyll deth us departe, yf holy Chyrche wyl it ordeyne; and therto I plyght the my trouth. |
| York missal | Wilt thou have this woman to thy wife, and love her and keep her in siknes and in helthe, and in all other degrees be to her as a husbande sholde be to his wife, and all other forsake for her, and holde the only to her to thy live's ende? | Wilt thou have this man to thy husbande, and to be buxum to him, serve him and kepe him in syknes and in helthe, etc. | I N. take the N. to my wedded wife, to have and to hold at bedde and at borde, for fairer for fouler, for better for warse, in sekenes and in hele, tyl dethe us depart. And thereto I plyght the my trouthe. | |
| 1549 Prayer Book | Wilte thou have this woman to thy wedded wife, to live together after Goddes ordeinaunce in the holy estate of matrimonie? Wilt thou love her, coumforte her, honor, and kepe her in sickenesse and in health? And forsaking all other kepe thee only to her, so long as you both shall live? | Wilt thou have this man to thy wedded houseband, to live together after Goddes ordeinaunce, in the holy estate of matrimonie? Wilt thou obey him, and serve him, love, honor, and kepe him in sickenes and in health? And forsaking al other kepe thee onely to him, so long as you bothe shall live? | I N. take thee N. to my wedded wife, to have and to holde from this day forwarde, for better, for wurse, for richer, for poorer, in sickenes, and in health, to love and to cherishe, til death us departe: according to Goddes holy ordeinaunce: And therto I plight thee my trouth. | I N. take thee N. to my wedded husbande, to have and to holde from this day forwarde, for better, for woorse, for richer, for poorer, in sickenes. and in health, to love, cherishe, and to obey, till death us departe: accordyng to Goddes holy ordeinaunce: And thereto I geve thee my trouth. |
| 1552 Prayer Book | Wilt thou have this woman to thy wedded wife, to live together after god's ordinaunce in the holy estate of matrimonie? Wilte thou love her, coumfort her, honour, and kepe her in sickenes and in health? And forsaking al other kepe thee onely to her, so long as you both shall lyve? | Wilte thou have this man to thy wedded housband, To lyve together after god's ordynaunce, in the holy estate of matrimony? Wylte thou obey him, and serve him, love, honor, and kepe him, in sickenes and in health? and forsakyng al other kepe thee onely unto him, so long as you both shall lyve? | I N. take thee N. to my wedded wife, to have and to hold from this day foreword, for better, for worse, for rycher, for poorer, in sickenes, and in health, to love, and to cherish, till death us depart, according to goddes holy ordynaunce: And thereto I plight thee my troth. | I N. take thee N. to my wedded husbande, to have and to holde from this day forewarde, for better, for worse, for richer, for poorer, in sickenes, and in health, to love, cherish, and to obeye, tyl death us depart, according to goddes holy ordynaunce: And thereto I geve thee my troth. |
| 1662 Prayer Book | Wilt thou have this woman to thy wedded wife, to live together after God's ordinance in the holy estate of Matrimony? Wilt thou love her, comfort her, honour, and keep her, in sickness and in health; and, forsaking all other, keep thee only unto her, so long as ye both shall live? | Wilt thou have this man to thy wedded husband, to live together after God's ordinance in the holy estate of Matrimony? Wilt thou obey him, and serve him, love, honour, and keep him, in sickness and in health; and, forsaking all other, keep thee only unto him, so long as ye both shall live? | I M. take thee N. to my wedded wife, to have and to hold, from this day forward, for better for worse, for richer for poorer, in sickness and in health, to love and to cherish, till death us do part, according to God's holy ordinance; and thereto I plight thee my troth. | I N. take thee M. to my wedded husband, to have and to hold from this day forward, for better for worse, for richer for poorer, in sickness and in health, to love, cherish, and to obey, till death us do part, according to God's holy ordinance; and thereto I give thee my troth. |

== See also ==
- Bride price
- Dowry
- Promise
- Vow
