= Physwick Hostel, Cambridge =

Physwick Hostel
- Cambridge University
- Location: Trinity Lane
- Founder: William Fiswick
- Established: 1393
- Closed: 1546
- Sister college: Gonville and Caius College, Cambridge
- Undergraduates: 30-40

Physwick or Fishwick Hostel is a former constituent of the University of Cambridge located on the south side of the present Trinity Great Court, between the Queen’s Gate and Trinity Street. It was founded in 1393 when William Fiswick (also known as Fishwick or Physwick), the first esquire or armiger bedel of the university, bequeathed his Trinity Lane hall to Gonville Hall (later Gonville and Caius College).

Chambers and lodgings were added by William Revell, rector of Titchwell, Norfolk, in his own benefice. Members of the hostel and main hall were able to use these for pleasure or in sickness during recurrences of the Black Death in England.

Physwick was far more populous than the main college Caius, usually between thirty and forty in number, but at one point over 80 commoner members at once, although it did not breed distinguished theologians, bishops and dignitaries. Walter Hart, Bishop of Norwich (1446–1472), maintained 12 students at Physwick. It did however maintain a reputation for many years, educating many eminent and learned men, some of whom were summoned to fill honourable positions in the parent college, others to hold offices of state.

Physwick hostel features in several of Susanna Gregory's Matthew Bartholomew series books.

In 1467 Gonville Hall also acquired St Margaret's Hostel and then in 1481 rebuilt the two as a single, substantial complex with hall and gate tower.

In 1546 Physwick and St Margaret's were merged into the new Trinity College by Henry VIII along with Michaelhouse, King’s Hall and five other hostels: Gregory’s, Ovyng’s, Catherine’s, Garratt, and Tyler’s.

== Principals of Physwick Hostel ==
It was administered by two Principals, one exterior, the other interior, who managed the finances, and directed the studies. The former was appointed by the Master of Caius College, the latter elected by the students themselves. That the selection of one of the Principals should be made by those whom he was to instruct is without parallel in early university institutions.

Principal Number	Date(s) of Appointment	Principal	Exterior appointed by the Master of Caius College / Interior elected by the students
-	1500 & 1503	John Tanne B.D.	exterior
-	1509	(Godfrey) Aleyn (Alan) MA	interior
-	1509-11	Edward Crome MA D.D.	exterior
-	1512-13	Nicholas Shaxton MA D.D.	exterior
-	1513-15	Robert Butler (Boteler) MA	exterior
-	1518-19	Richard Hoare (Hoor) MA	exterior
-	1519-21	John Skipp MA D.D.	exterior
-	1521	Thomas Bacon D.D.	exterior
16	12 November 1533	John Caius MD	exterior
-	1537	Thomas Ocley MA	exterior
-	undated, died 1551	William Filey D.D.	exterior
-	undated, MA 1523	Thomas Bonenfant	exterior
