= King's Hall, Cambridge =

Former college of the University of Cambridge

King's Hall
- Cambridge University
- Location: North of the path between the Master's Lodge and Great Gate in Trinity College
- Full name: King's Hall
- Latin name: Aula Regis
- Founder: John Hotham, Bishop of Ely
- Established: 1317 (merged to form Trinity College in 1546)
- Named for: Edward II of England

King's Hall was one of the earliest constituent colleges of University of Cambridge. It was founded in 1317, the second after Peterhouse. King's Hall was established by King Edward II to provide chancery clerks for his administration, and was rich compared to nearby Michaelhouse, which occupied the southern area of what is now Great Court, Trinity College, Cambridge. Henry VIII combined King's Hall, Michaelhouse and seven hostels to form Trinity College, Cambridge in 1546.

== History ==
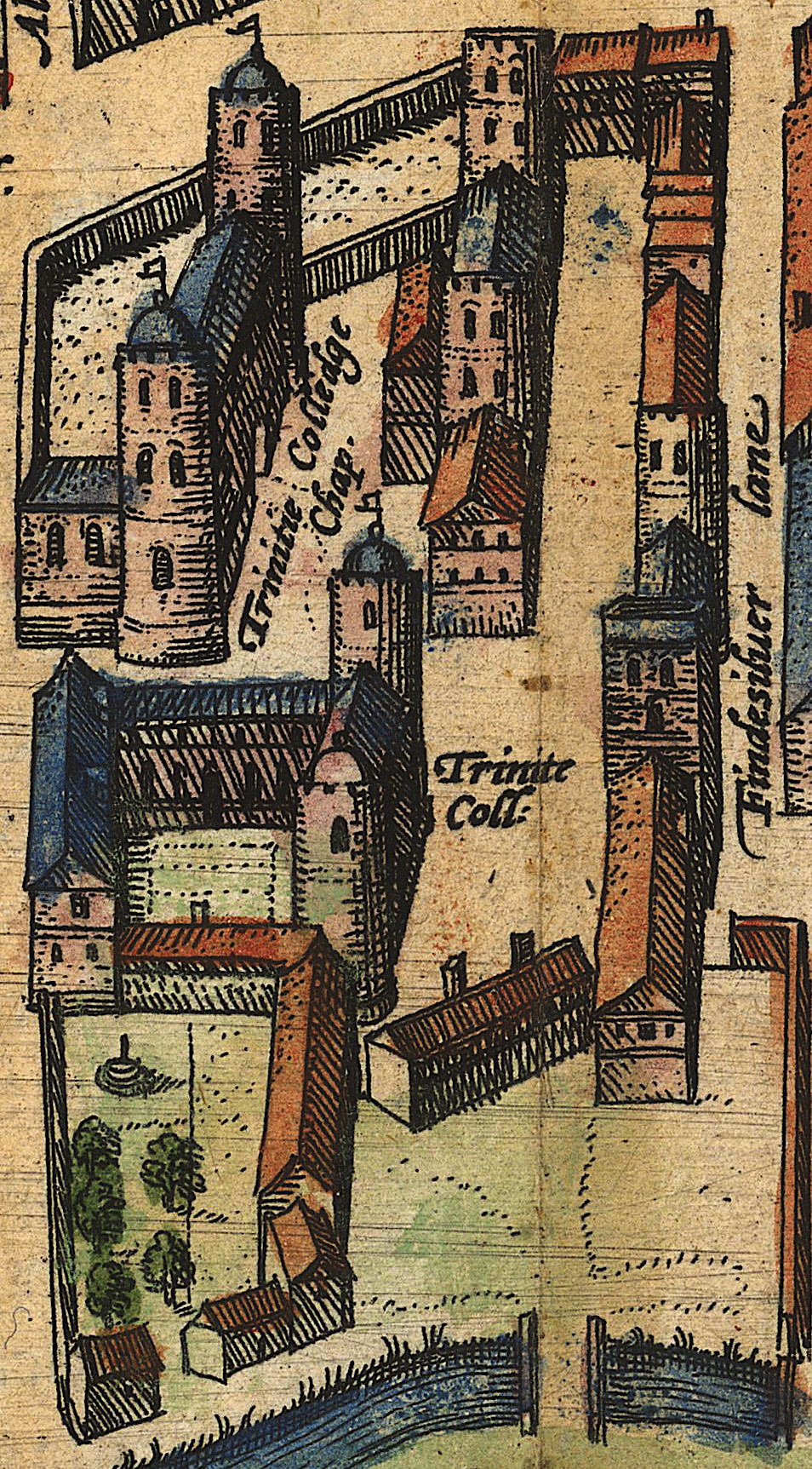
1575 map of Trinity College showing the King's Hall (top left) and Michaelhouse (top right) buildings before Nevile's reconstruction

Alan Cobban has identified John Hotham, Bishop of Ely, as the person who guided Edward II in this foundation. It received letters patent from Edward III in 1337. In 1412, the master or warden is recorded as Richard Derham. In 1433, Richard Pyghtesley was described as a clerk, in King's Hall (Aula Regis).

King's Hall no longer exists, as it was combined with Michaelhouse in the mid 16th century by King Henry VIII, as one of his last acts. At the time, the king had been wiping out and seizing Church lands from monasteries. It is thought that the king had great plans to create a college to rival Oxford's Christ Church with great new architecture, but he died a few weeks after the college was created. The layout of Great Court is mainly due to Thomas Nevile, a master of Trinity. The universities of Oxford and Cambridge, being both religious institutions and quite rich, expected to be the next target, and, indeed, the king duly passed an act of parliament, the Dissolution of Colleges Act 1545 (37 Hen. 8. c. 4), that allowed him to suppress (and confiscate the property of) any college he wished.

The universities of Oxford and Cambridge remained dominated by Anglican clergy until well into the 19th century - this was one of the driving aspects for the setting up of secular institutions, e.g. University College London to cater for dissenters.

The universities used their contacts to plead with Henry VIII's sixth wife, Catherine Parr. The Queen persuaded her husband not to close them down, but to create a new college. The King did not want to use royal funds, so he instead combined the two colleges of King's Hall and Michaelhouse and seven hostels of Catherine's, Garratt, Gregory's, Margaret's, Ovyng's, Physwick (formerly part of Gonville and Caius) and Tyler's to form Trinity in 1546. This, combined with lands confiscated from the Church, caused Trinity to be the richest and biggest college, a position it has retained.

== Location ==
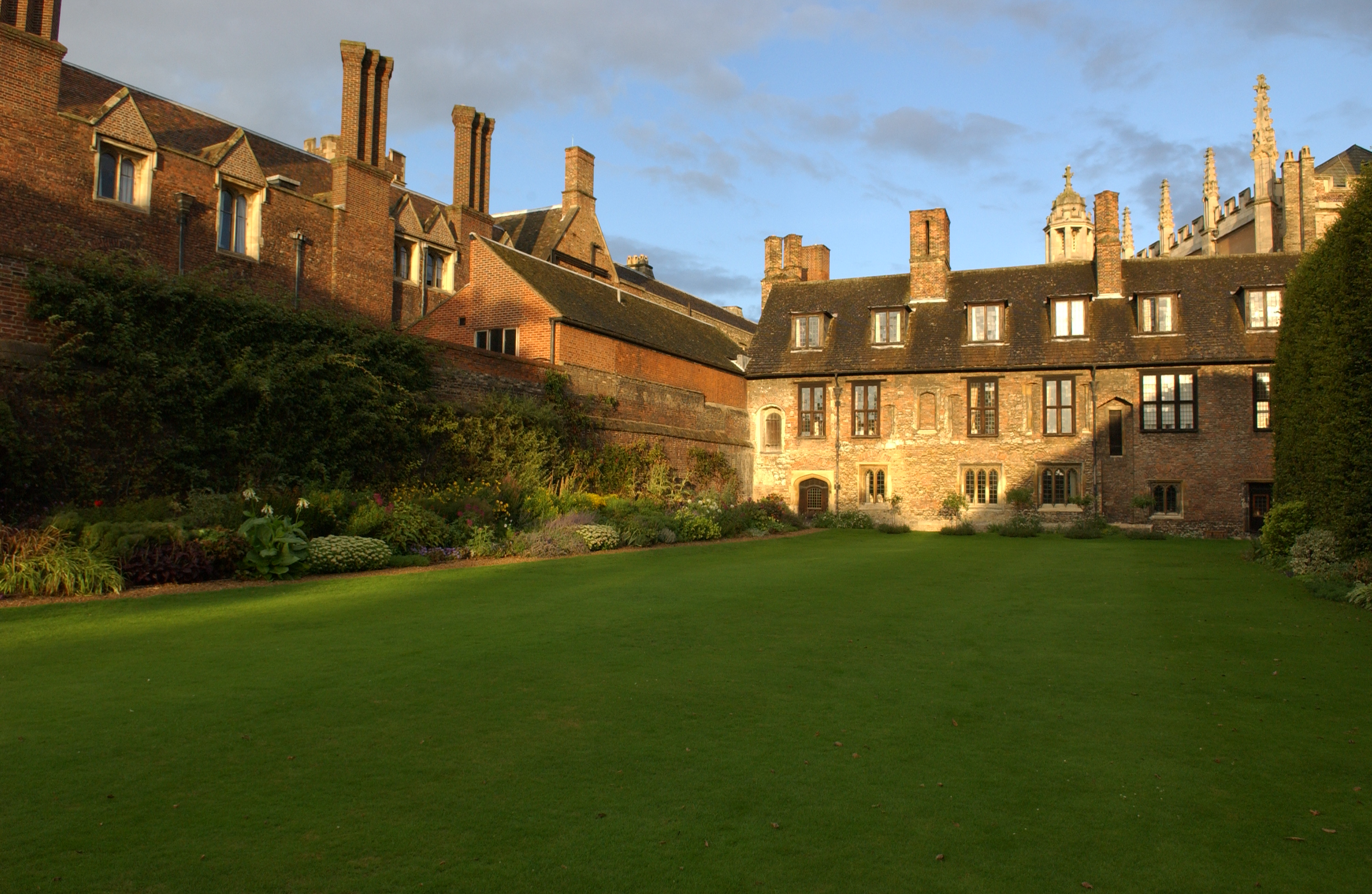
Trinity College Fellows' Bowling Green, with the oldest building in the college (originally part of King's Hall) in the background at right

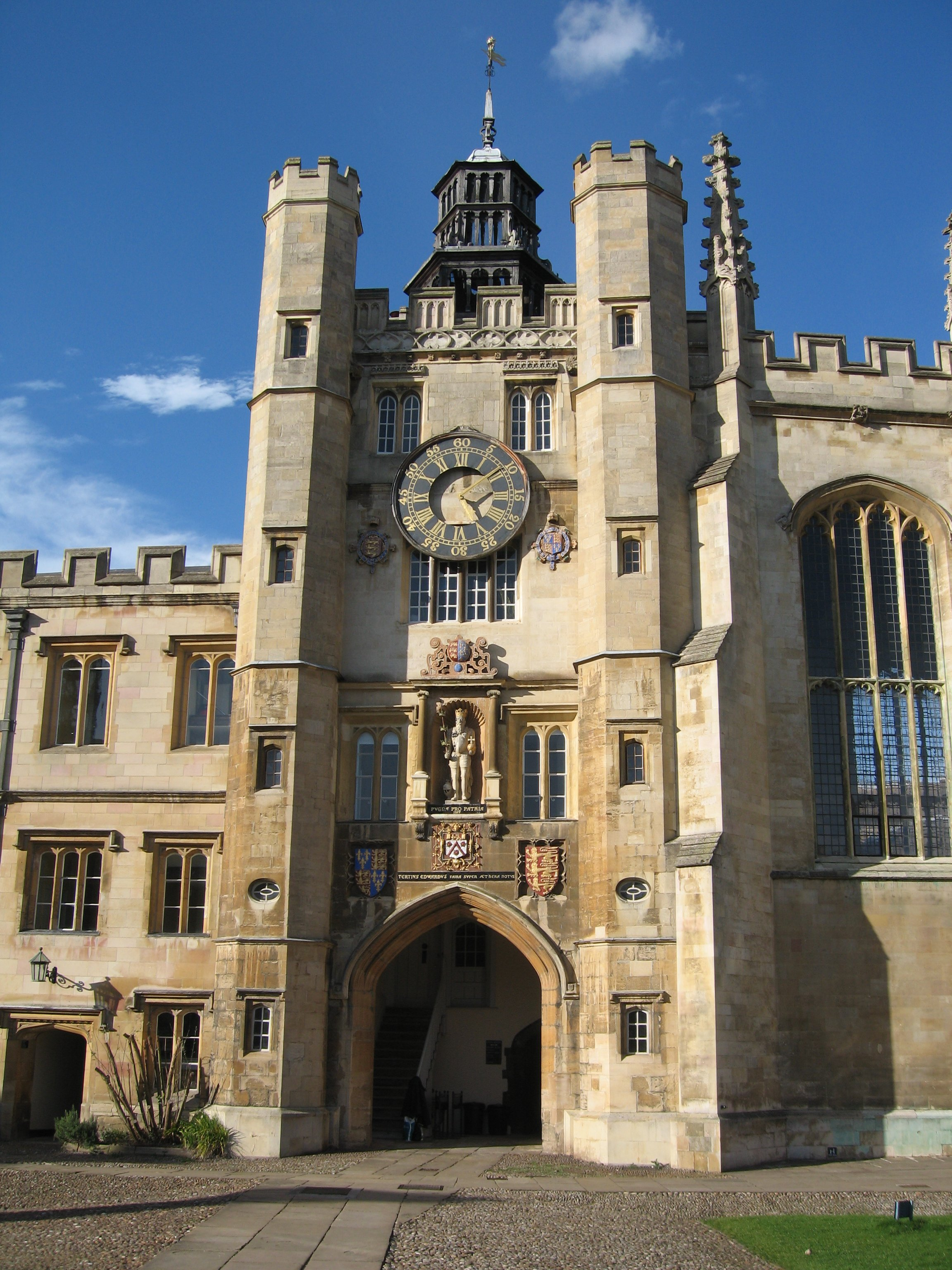
King Edward's Gate or the Clock Tower, Great Court, Trinity College

King's Hall was located in what is now the northern section of the Great Court of Trinity College, and there still stands an original building from that time. It is found off Great Court next to the chapel, and contains some of the most coveted rooms in the college, generally held only by long-standing fellows of great academic merit, staircases C and D Great Court. The Clock Tower was from King's Hall but was moved from where the sundial now is, and the Great Gate of Trinity was built just before the amalgamation and thus still bears the King's Hall name, in Latin. The last buildings of Michaelhouse were recorded as being knocked down with the completion of the southern section of Great Court.

== Notes ==
- This article derives some information from an edition of Trinity College - An Historical Sketch by G. M. Trevelyan, along with information from various individuals associated with the college and the university.
- In Geoffrey Chaucer's The Canterbury Tales, "The Reeve's Tale" tells of two students from 'Soler Halle' (another name for King's Hall), who take their revenge on a thieving miller and his family for stealing grain from the university.
