= York rite =

York rite may refer to:

- the York Rite, one of the rites of Freemasonry
- the Use of York, an English Christian liturgical rite
