= Thomas Bacon (academic) =

Master of Gonville Hall, Cambridge (d.1559)

- Died: 1 January 1559; Chelsfield
- Resting place: Chelsfield
- Education: Gonville Hall, Cambridge

Thomas Bacon (died 1 January 1559) was the fifteenth master of Gonville Hall, Cambridge (later Gonville and Caius College) from 1552.

Bacon was educated at Gonville Hall, graduating B.A. 1517–8, M.A. 1521, D.D. 1556–7. He held a scholarship from Michaelmas 1517 to 1519, and a fellowship from 1519 to 1527. In 1521 he was Principal of Physwick Hostel, a university hall annexed to Gonville Hall.

He served as a chaplain to King Henry VIII, and held the following church livings:

- Rector of Hockwold, Norfolk, 1529–39;
- Rector of Chelsfield, Kent, 1532–59;
- Rector of Barrow, Suffolk, 1539;
- Canon of Stoke-by-Clare;
- Canon of Ely Cathedral, 1544–59;
- Vicar of Hoxne, Suffolk.

Bacon was appointed Master of Gonville Hall in 1552. On Queen Mary's Visitation to Cambridge in 1557, the bodies of two deceased reformers were exhumed and burned; according to Venn, the arrangements for this were made at Bacon's lodge at Gonville Hall.

When in 1557 John Caius refounded Gonville Hall as Gonville and Caius College, Caius' statutes appointed Bacon Master of the new foundation. Caius' character assessment of Bacon was not positive: homo certe gravis, mitis, et amabilis, sed custos inutilis et negligens (certainly a serious, gentle, and amicable man, but a useless and negligent custodian). Bacon died at Chelsfield on 1 January 1559 and was buried there on 3 January; he was succeeded as Master by John Caius.

== Offices Held ==
Academic offices
Preceded by John Styrmin	Master of Gonville Hall, Cambridge; 1552–1559	Succeeded by John Caius
Religious titles
Unknown	Canon of Ely; 1544–1559	Unknown
