= Michaelhouse, Cambridge =

Former college of the University of Cambridge

Michaelhouse
- Cambridge University
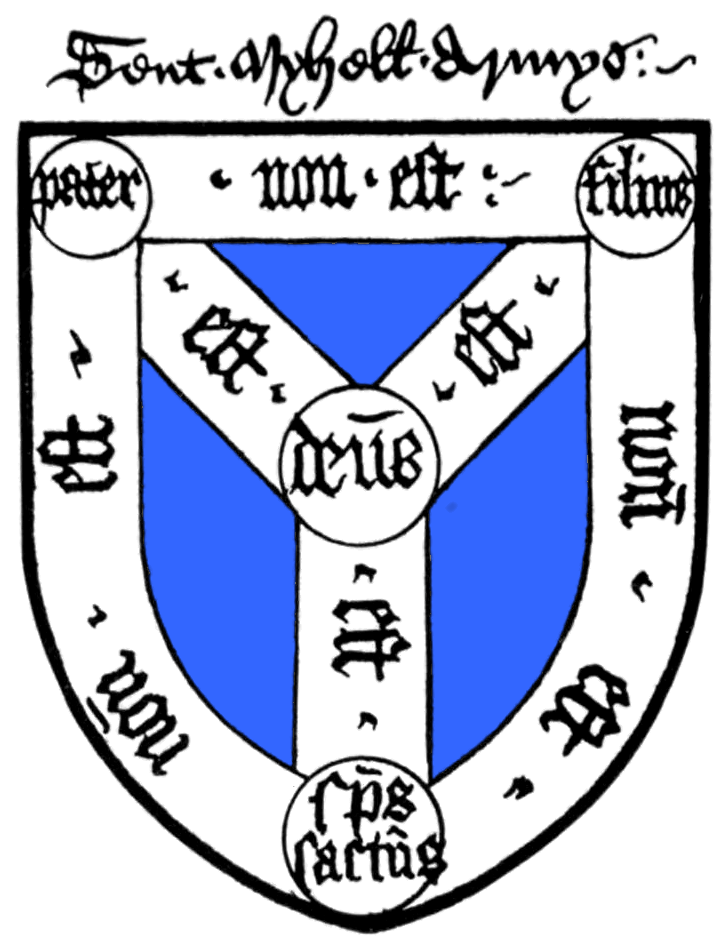
- Location: Trinity Street, Cambridge
- Coordinates: 52.207°N 0.117°E
- Full name: The House of Scholars of St Michael
- Motto: Panem angelorum manducavit homo (Latin)
- Motto in English: Man hath eaten the bread of Angels
- Established: 1324 (merged with King's Hall to form Trinity College in 1546)
- Named for: The Holy and Undivided Trinity, the Blessed Virgin Mary, St Michael the Archangel and All Saints

Michaelhouse is a former college of the University of Cambridge, that existed between 1323 and 1546, when it was merged with King's Hall to form Trinity College. Michaelhouse was the second residential college to be founded, after Peterhouse (1284). Though King's Hall was established earlier in 1317, it did not acquire actual premises until its re-foundation by Edward III in 1336. The name Michaelhouse is now used for St Michael's Church.

== Foundation and early history ==
Established formally on Michaelmas Day 1324 as a college for scholars in Holy Orders, Michaelhouse is named after the parish church of the same name located on Cambridge's magna strata or High Street (today's Trinity Street). Founded by Hervey de Stanton, Edward II's Chancellor of the Exchequer and Lord Chief Justice (Chief Justice of the Pleas) of England, the college was established between spring 1323 and autumn 1324. On 28 May 1323, de Stanton obtained from Dera de Madingley the advowson (or right of presentation) to the parish of St Michael as well as her messuage on the High Street 'for a hundred silver marks.' On 16 March 1323/4, de Stanton purchased for another hundred silver marks an extensive property located on St Michael's Lane, complete with walled garden and a quay on the wharves of the River Cam owned by Robert Buttetourte.

=== Charter and establishment ===
In May 1324, Edward II granted a royal charter to the new college. On 31 August 1324, the Bishop of Ely, John Hotham, granted his own charter. The following day, John de Crauden, prior of the monastic foundation of Ely, added his agreement under the chapter seal. King, bishop and prior left de Stanton free hand in the appointment of the college’s first Master and the drafting of statutes for his college. On Michaelmas Day that year, Walter de Buxton, priest, was appointed the College's first Master.

=== Expansion of the college ===
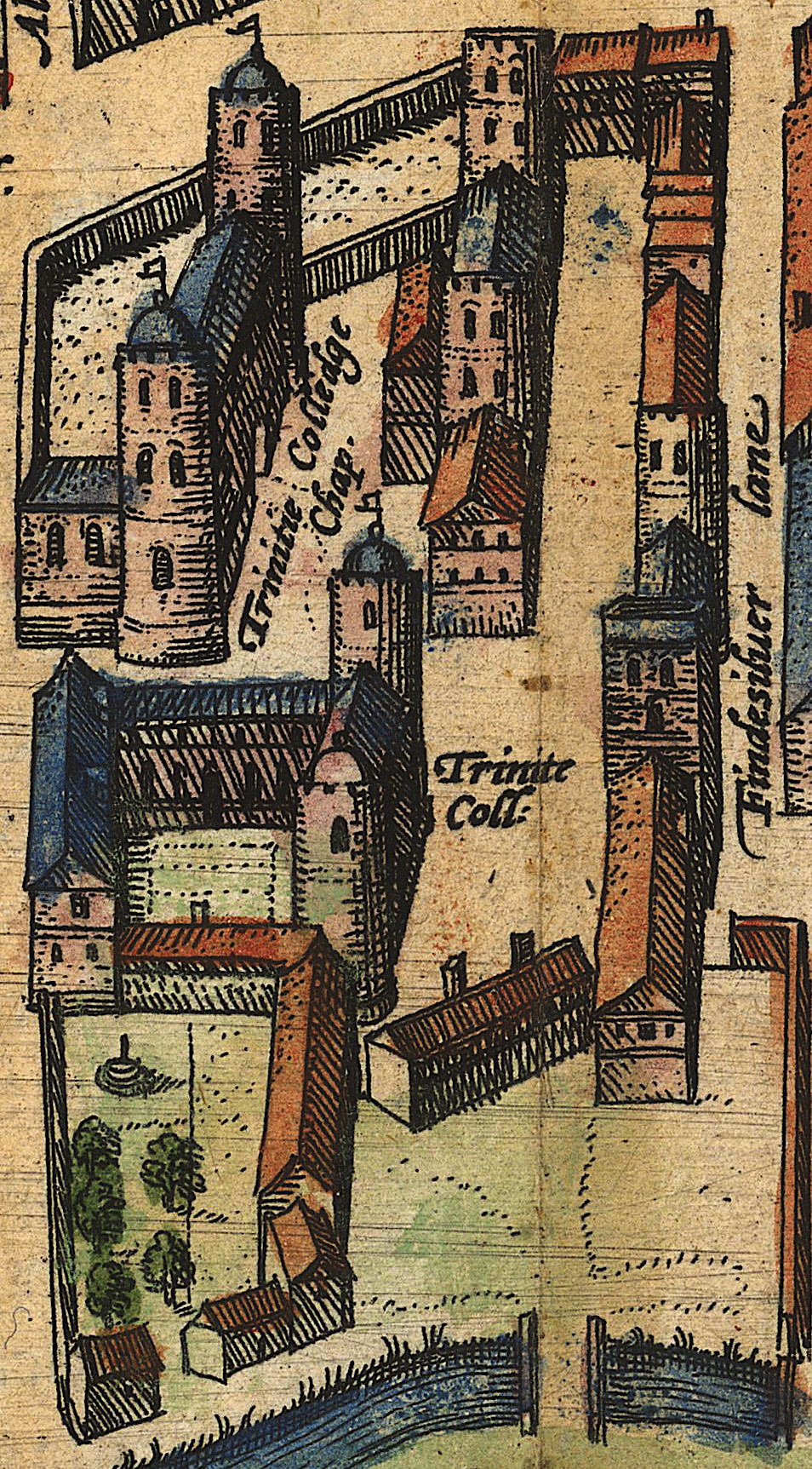
1575 map of Trinity College showing the King's Hall (top left) and Michaelhouse (top right) buildings before Nevile's reconstruction (east is at the top)

On 11 November 1324 Hervey de Stanton obtained the properties of Adam de Trumpington, rector of Buckland, for his college. At about the same time, he ordered the rebuilding of the parish church in the Decorated style for use as a chapel. Following his death on All Souls' Day 1325, de Stanton was buried in the unfinished chancel. His executors, John de Illegh and Alexander Walsham, continued the expansion of the College by purchasing further properties between St Michael's Lane (today's Trinity Lane), and the river, an area now occupied by the southwest corner of Trinity's Great Court, and Neville Court. These included the purchase, in 1329, of two hostels South of St Michael's lane and Milne Street (today's Trinity Hall Lane), Ovyng and Garret Hostel. The latter gave its name to the lane leading to the river.

At Michaelmas 1337, de Illegh acquired another hall of residence adjacent to the King's Hall, known as Crouched Hall or Newmarket Hostel. Two properties located on St Michael's Lane complete the early expansion: the bequest by Joan de Refham in 1549 of her home and shops led to the establishment of St Katherine's Hostel, and the acquisition in 1353 of a house owned by Archdeacon of Norfolk that gave way to St Gregory's Hostel. The latter almost certainly took its name from the dedication of one of the chapels at St Michael's Church. By the mid-14th century, Michaelhouse took up most of the present south-west corner of Trinity College's Great Court and New Court, further acquiring lands now occupied by Trinity's Scholars' Lawn and the Wren Library. The college's core property included a navigable stream and a ditch which formed a natural boundary with the adjacent common, and the King's Hall. The College benefited from a number of other local properties and further endowments. Indeed, although its buildings were never grand but of a size suitable to the small fellowship (the Hall measured only around 26 metres by 12 metres), by the time of its dissolution Michaelhouse had an annual income in excess of £140, some £50 higher than that of St Peter's Monastery in Westminster (Westminster Abbey).

== Masters of the College of St Michael ==
Walter de Buxton, priest, 1324
Henry Granby, fl. 1418
John Fisher, 1497-1505

== Reformation and dissolution ==
Throughout its existence, the college remained a study house for clergy with a conservative theological ethos. The main exponent of this thinking is probably John Fisher, who served as Master between 1497 and 1505. As chancellor of the university, Fisher was instrumental in the foundation of St John's and Christ's. As Bishop of Rochester he maintained the conservative stance on the royal supremacy and the reformation measures of king Henry VIII shared by much of the Michaelhouse fellowship which, more prominent and vociferous in his case, ultimately led to Fisher's execution in 1535.

Ironically, Henry VIII made use of the same measures challenged by the Michaelhouse fellowship to dissolve the college. Following the dissolution of religious houses in England, Cambridge University rightly feared for the future of its colleges, many of which were religious foundations or study houses for clergy. The university was able to make use of its contacts to petition the queen, Katharine Parr who, in turn, persuaded Henry to spare most colleges. Indeed, the two colleges facing dissolution, together with vast tracts of land acquired from the dissolution of the monasteries, would eventually endow a new royal foundation befitting his grandeur. Consequently, in 1546 Michaelhouse was dissolved by the Dissolution of Colleges Act 1545 (37 Hen. 8. c. 4), and merged with its neighbour King's Hall to form Trinity College. Further endowed by Mary Tudor and Elizabeth I, Trinity remains one of the largest colleges and the wealthiest college in the university.

Unlike the few remaining remnants of King's Hall north of King Edward's Tower, following the building of Great Court at the end of the 16th century, nothing much remains of the original Michaelhouse buildings, though its stones probably served as ready building materials. While the hall was adapted for use by the new college in 1546, its walls are now hidden behind the 18th-century ashlaring of the kitchens and combination rooms south of the present Dining Hall.

== St Michael's Church ==
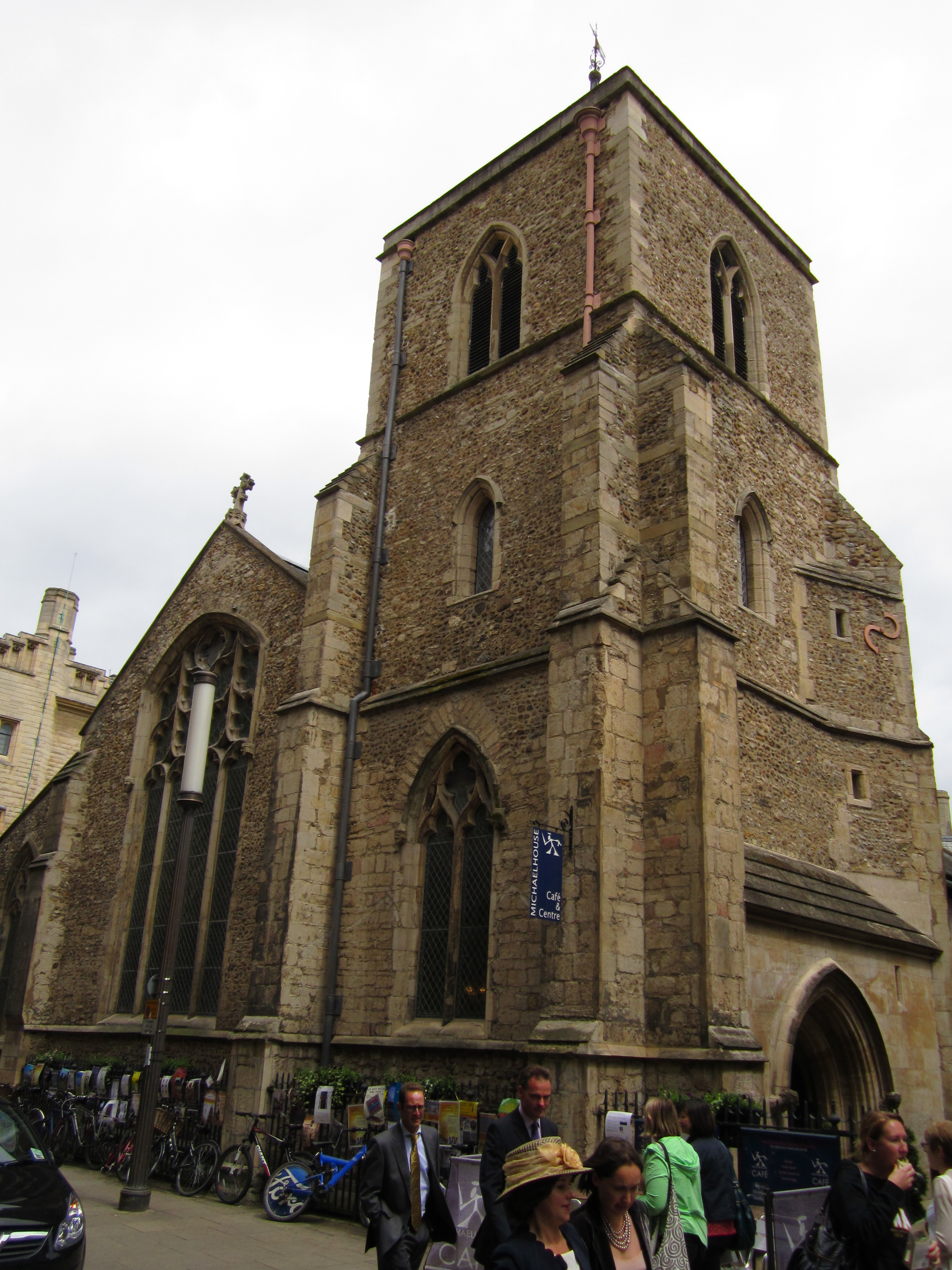
The current St Michael's church

The parish church of St Michael probably dates back to the foundation of the city of Cambridge itself, though no written records survive prior to a valuation of the living in 1217. Substantially rebuilt by Hervey de Stanton in the Decorated style, the Church was designed to serve both the parish and the college. The chancel is three bays long, a bay larger than the nave; both chancel and nave have sizeable side aisles. In 1324, de Stanton had suggested to the bishop of Ely that the master and fellows, who were all members of the clergy, could provide daily worship for the parish, since they already used the church as their chapel. Consequently, on 18 March 1324/5, the first Master of Michaelhouse, Walter de Buxton was inducted as vicar of St Michael's Church.

=== Parish church and chapel for three colleges ===
The church's nave would have been used for parish worship, regular preaching, university debates and lectures. Until the completion of a chapel for neighbouring Gonville Hall in 1396, both Michaelhouse and Gonville shared in the use of the two aisles; Gonville making use of the north aisle of the church, Michaelhouse using the south. Since Gonville Hall was dedicated to the Annunciation of the Blessed Virgin Mary, the north aisle altar was also dedicated to the Blessed Virgin. The south aisle altar was known as that of "St Gregory of Pity", indicating that it would have been surmounted by an image of the Pity, that is, Christ and the instruments of the Passion. Its association with St Gregory derives from a vision by Pope Gregory the Great when celebrating mass of Christ's real presence and sacrifice in the eucharistic bread. One of the later Hostels of Michaelhouse shared the dedication of the College chapel. While the altarpiece may have survived the reformation, it certainly would not have survived local Cromwellian iconoclasm, and was most likely destroyed, alongside other images in St Michael's, on Boxing Day 1643. However, a late-medieval scutum sancti Trinitatis (Shield of the Trinity), in the middle ages widely believed to be the Shield of St Michael and probably used as the College's coat of arms, has survived in the chapel's stained glass window.

Michaelhouse clergy served the parish until the dissolution of the College in 1546. From the time of the demolition of the King's Hall Chapel in 1550, until the completion, on the same site, of Trinity College Chapel under Elizabeth I of England in 1565, the scholars of Trinity made use of St Michael's Church as their chapel. In the process of establishing a new chapel, 36 scholars' stalls created in 1485 by 'John Day, Carvar' for the King's Hall Chapel, some with carved misericords, were removed to St Michael's, where they remain to date. As successor of Hervey de Stanton's foundation, Trinity College continues to hold the patronage of the living of St Michael's and, during the 16th to 18th centuries, fellows in Holy Orders at Trinity College ministered as clergy (so-called 'chaplains') of St Michael's. The present minister retains this title.

=== Diocesan church ===
From the middle of the 17th century until the middle of the 19th century, the church was used as a venue of the episcopal and archidiaconal visitations for the Diocese of Ely. Similarly, diocesan confirmation services would be held at St Michael's rather than in Ely Cathedral. On 11 November 1849, as the congregation was gathering for Sunday worship, the heating system caused the church roof to catch fire, resulting in the careful rebuilding of the roof by George Gilbert Scott and the restoration of the church the following year. Scott's renovation did not extend beyond introducing a new stone porch at the north side of the church, the major restructuring of the church fell to Scott's son, George Gilbert Scott, Jr.

=== Scott's refurbishment ===
From 1870 to 1872, George Gilbert Scott Jr was asked to design a fine new east window in memory of one of the parish clergy, William Beamont. In the process, Scott proposed the complete remodelling of the sanctuary, including the creation of an ascent of four steps to match the levels of the 14th-century sedilia, and the creation of a tall new altarpiece that would extend 'up to three feet above the window cill [sic] level'. For his three-tiered new reredos, Scott made use of parts of the existing, much smaller, altarpiece created between 1864 and 1868 by Louvain woodcarver Michiel Abeloos. Abeloos had previously collaborated with George Gilbert Scott on the carved choir stalls at Ely Cathedral. Abeloos' figures of the archangels Michael and Gabriel, the Last Supper and the College motto were all incorporated into a much grander piece, the work of local carpenters Rattee and Kett and artist F. R. Leach. In Cambridge, Leach also collaborated with George Frederick Bodley on the ceiling and frescoes of All Saints' Church, Jesus Lane, the ceiling of Jesus College Chapel, and the dining hall ceiling at Queens'. In 1874, Leach painted the Chancel ceiling and arches of St Michael's to designs of Scott as a thank-offering, without accepting any payment. Parts of the north aisle had been painted previously to designs by Holman Hunt.

=== Michaelhouse Centre ===
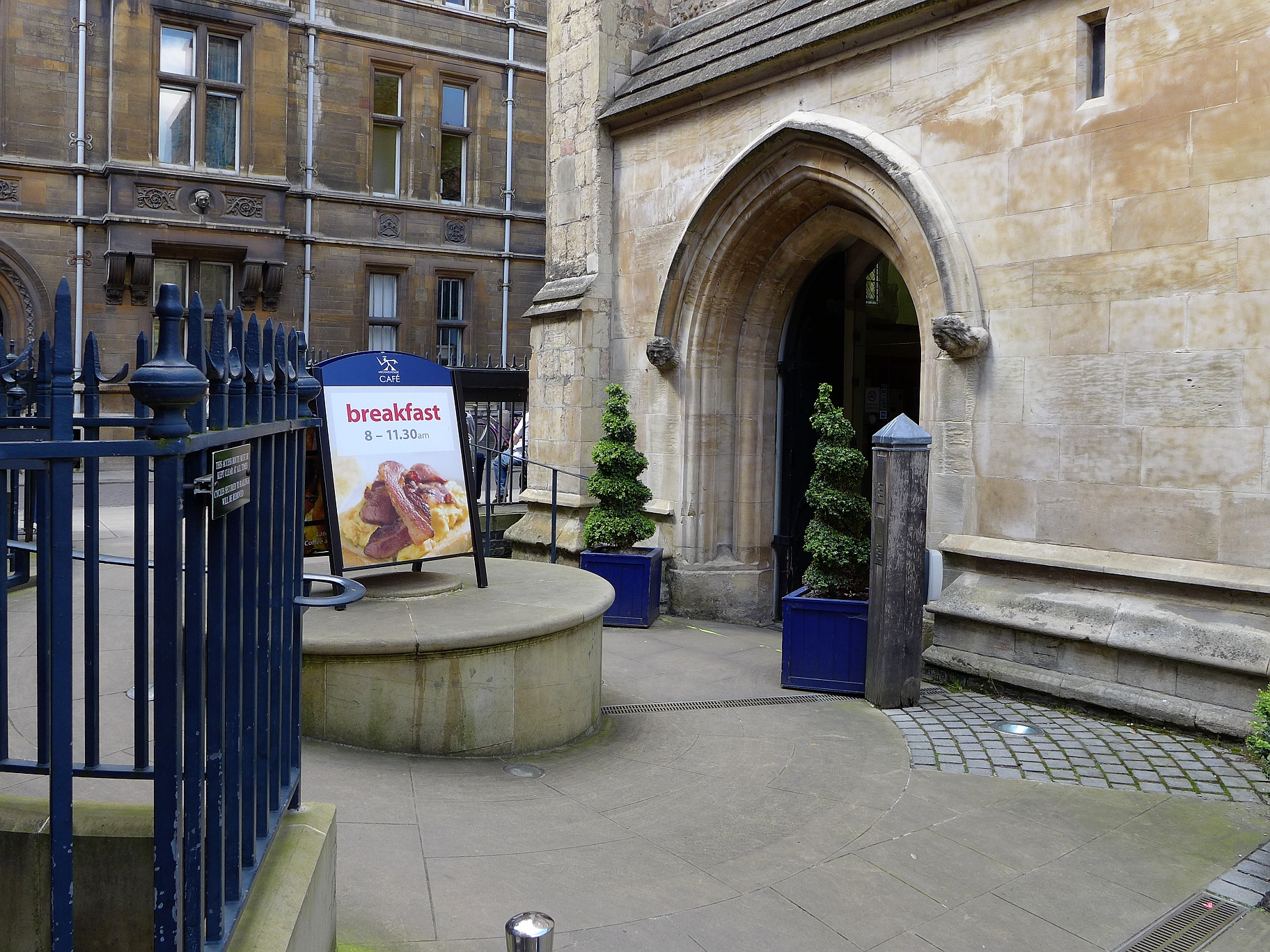
The entrance to Michaelhouse and the café

Ultimately, the parish proved too small to be sustainable. Indeed, from as early as 1550, when it was suggested that it should be united with the parish of All Saints in the Jewry, St Michael's parish was threatened with fusion with neighbouring parishes. It was finally united with that of Great St Mary's in 1908. Substantially refurbished in 2001–2002, the church now bears the College's name, Michaelhouse Centre, Cambridge. It serves as a lively weekday church, community centre, art gallery and a café managed by a charitable trust on behalf of the church council of the united parish. The chapel adjacent to de Stanton's grave is named in his memory and now, as then, forms the focal point for daily devotions at the church he built.

== In popular culture ==
Michaelhouse is the setting for the Matthew Bartholomew Chronicles, a series of Mediaeval mystery novels by Susanna Gregory.
