= Dissolution of Colleges Act 1547 =

Act of the Parliament of England

Dissolution of Colleges Act 1547 (Note: The citation of this act by this short title was authorised by section 5 of, and the second schedule to, the Statute Law Revision Act 1948. Due to the repeal of those provisions, it is now authorised by section 19(2) of the Interpretation Act 1978.)
- Act of Parliament
- Parliament of England
- Long title: An Acte wherby certaine Chauntries Colleges Free Chapelles and the Possessions of the same be given to the Kinges Majestie. (Note: These words are printed against this act in the second column of the second schedule to the Statute Law Revision Act 1948, which is headed "Title".)
- Citation: 1 Edw. 6. c. 14
- Territorial extent: England and Wales

Dates
- Royal assent: 24 December 1547
- Commencement: 4 November 1547 (Note: Start of session.)
- Repealed: 1 January 1961

Other legislation
- Amended by: Statute Law Revision Act 1950
- Repealed by: Charities Act 1960
- Relates to: Dissolution of Colleges Act 1545

Status: Repealed

Text of statute as originally enacted

The Dissolution of Colleges Act 1547 (1 Edw. 6. c. 14), also known as the Abolition of Chantries Act 1547 or the Chantries Act 1547, was an act of the Parliament of England.

== Subsequent developments ==
Section 23 of the act was repealed by section 1(1) of, and the first schedule to, the Statute Law Revision Act 1950 (14 Geo. 6. c. 6), which came into force on 23 May 1950.

The whole act was repealed by section 39(1) of, and schedule 5 to, the Charities Act 1960 (8 & 9 Eliz. 2. c. 58), which came into force on 1 January 1961.

== See also ==
- Chantry § Abolition of Chantries Acts, 1545 and 1547
