= Use of Hereford =

Variant of the Roman Rite

The Use of Hereford or Hereford Use was a variant of the Roman Rite used in Herefordshire before the English Reformation. When Peter of Aigueblanche, Bishop of Hereford, returned to his native Savoy he used it in his church in Aiguebelle.

== See also ==
- Use of Sarum
- Use of York
