= John Caius =

English physician (1510–1573)

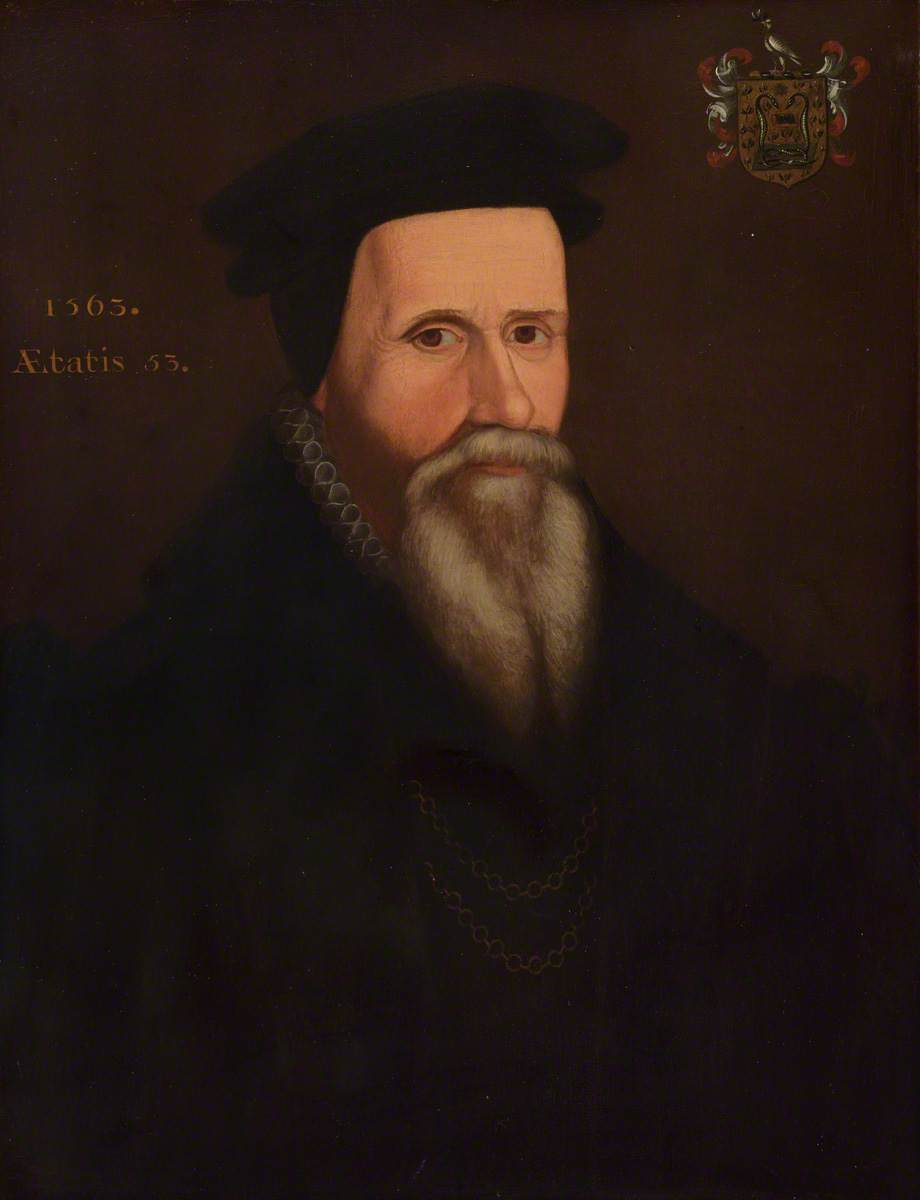
- Born: John Kays; 6 October 1510; Norwich, England
- Died: 29 July 1573 (aged 62); London, England
- Education: Gonville Hall, Cambridge; University of Padua
- Known for: Second founder of Gonville and Caius College, Cambridge
- Scientific career
- Fields: Medicine
- Workplaces: Gonville and Caius College, Cambridge
- Academic advisors: Montanus; Vesalius

John Caius (born John Kays /ˈkiːz/; (Note: Caius is a Latinised version of Kees or Keys. The name of the college is today pronounced as 'Keys'.) 6 October 1510 – 29 July 1573), also known as Johannes Caius and Ioannes Caius, was an English physician, second founder of Gonville and Caius College, Cambridge, scholar, and physician to Edward VI and Mary I.

== Biography ==
=== Early years ===
Caius was born in Norwich and was educated at Norwich School. In 1529, he was admitted as a student at Gonville Hall, Cambridge, founded by Edmund Gonville in 1348, where he seems to have mainly studied divinity.

After graduating in 1533, he visited Italy, where he studied under Montanus and Vesalius at Padua. In 1541 he took his degree as a physician at the University of Padua.

In 1543 he visited several parts of Italy, Germany and France and then returned to England. Upon his return from Italy he Latinised his surname which was somewhat fashionable at the time.

=== Career ===
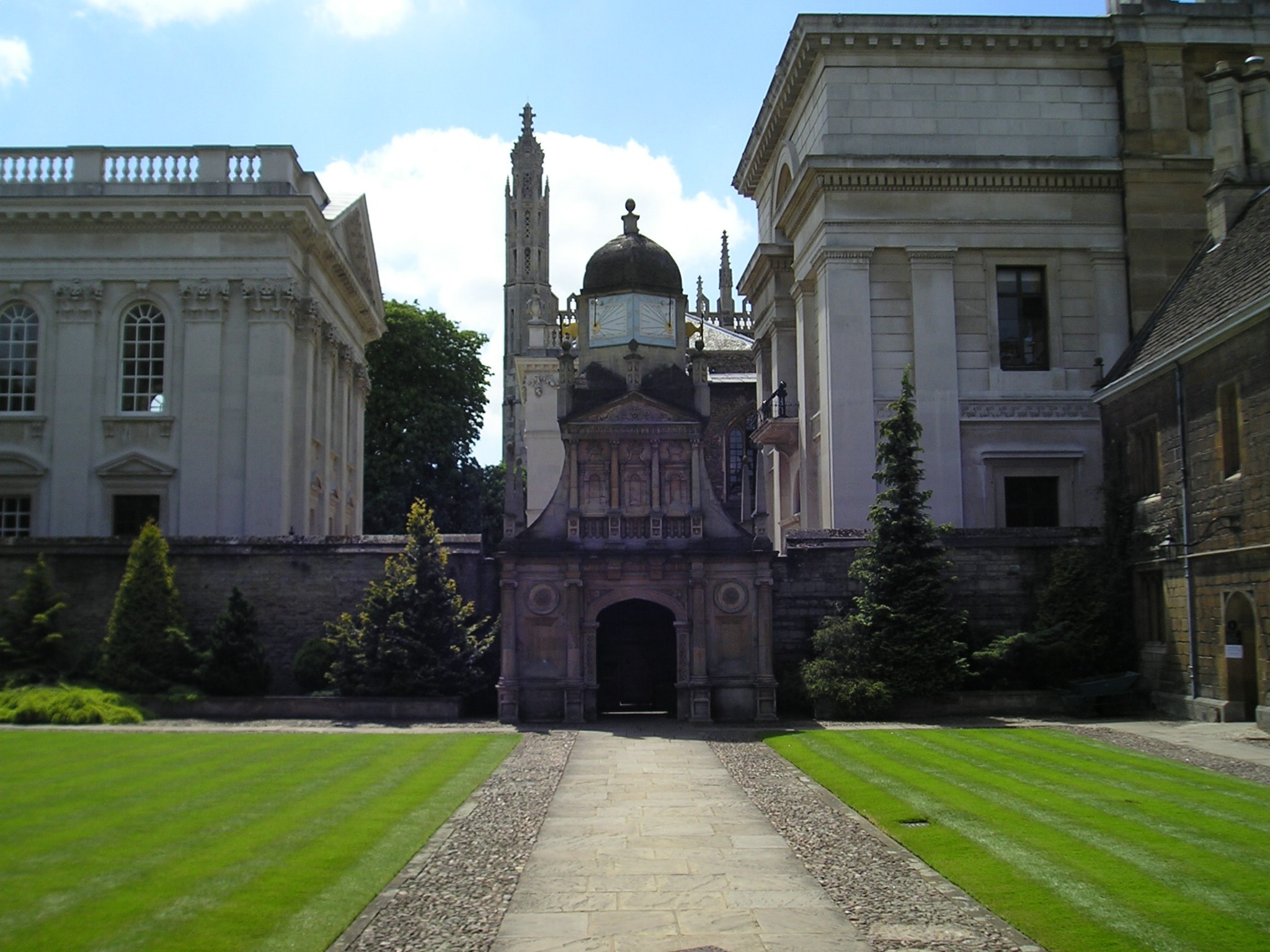
The Gate of Honour, Caius Court, Gonville and Caius College, Cambridge

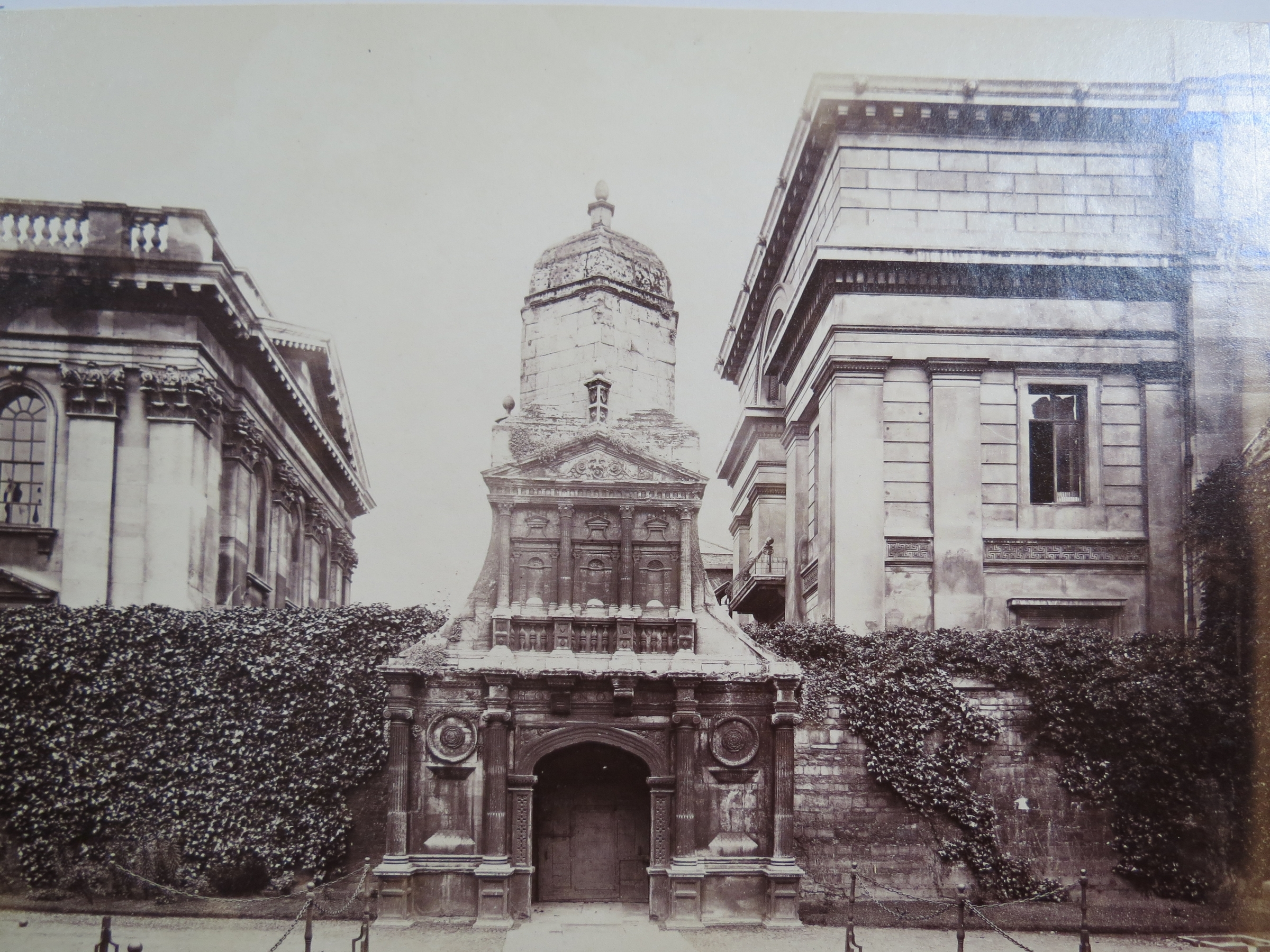
Gate of Honour, Gonville & Caius College

Caius was a physician in London in 1547, and was admitted as a fellow of the College of Physicians, of which he was for many years president.

In 1551 he was attending in Shrewsbury when a notable outbreak of sweating sickness occurred in the town; the following year, after his return to London, he published A Boke or Counseill Against the Disease Commonly Called the Sweate, or Sweatyng Sicknesse (1552), which became the main source of knowledge of this disease, now understood to be influenza.

In 1557 Caius, at that time physician to Queen Mary, enlarged the foundation of his old college, changed the name from "Gonville Hall" to "Gonville and Caius College", and endowed it with several considerable estates, adding an entire new court at the expense of £1,834 (equivalent to £624,676 in 2025). He accepted the mastership of the college 24 January 1559 on the death of Thomas Bacon, and held it until about a month before his own death.

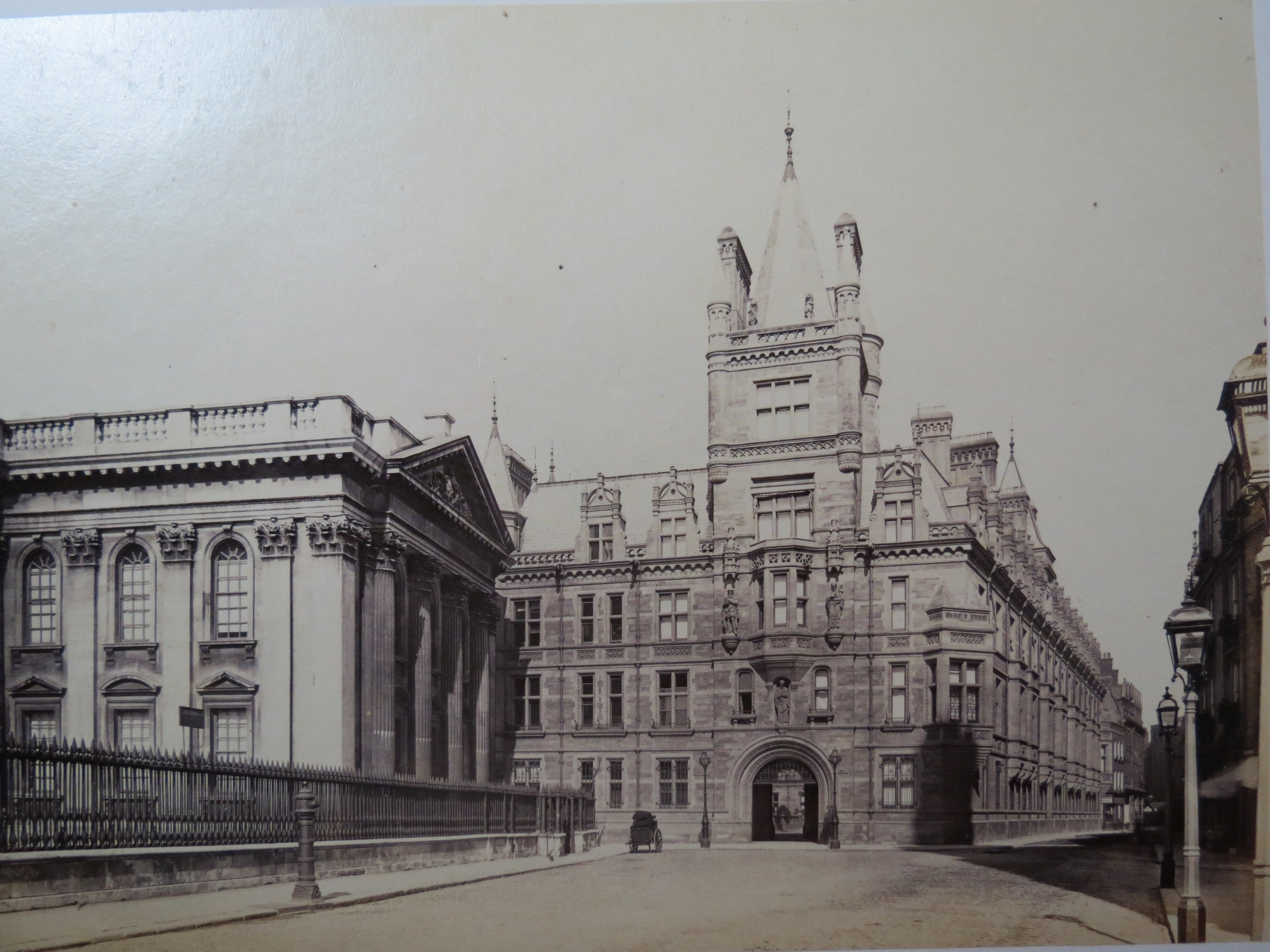
Gonville & Caius College, from King's Parade

He was physician to Edward VI, Queen Mary, and Queen Elizabeth. From this position he was dismissed in 1568 on account of his adherence to the Roman Catholic faith. He was incongruously accused both of atheism, and of keeping secretly a collection of ornaments and vestments for Roman Catholic use. The latter were found and burned in the college court.

He was elected nine times president of the College of Physicians, an account of which, Annales collegii medicorum 1520–1565, he left in manuscript.

He returned to Cambridge from London for a few days in June 1573, about a month before his death, and resigned the mastership to Thomas Legge, a tutor at Jesus College. He died at his London house, in St Bartholomew's Hospital, on 29 July 1573, but his body was brought to Cambridge, and buried in the chapel under the monument which he had designed.

The question of whether he was the inspiration for the character of Dr Caius in William Shakespeare's play the Merry Wives of Windsor has been discussed at length by Arnold McNair, 1st Baron McNair.

== Legacy ==
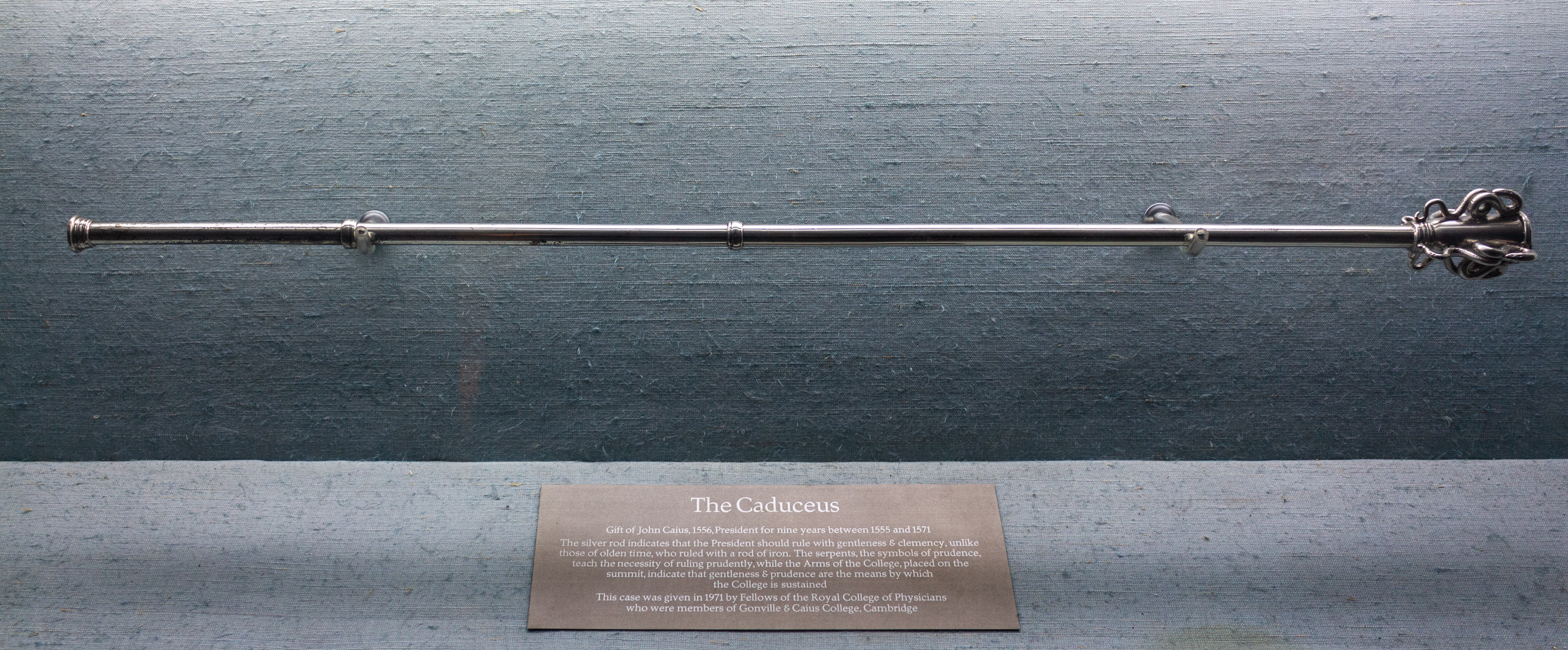
Silver caduceus presented by Caius to the College of Physicians

Caius was a learned, active and benevolent man. In 1557 he erected a monument in St Paul's Cathedral to the memory of Thomas Linacre. In 1564, he obtained a grant for Gonville and Caius College to take the bodies of two malefactors annually for dissection; he was thus an important pioneer in advancing the science of anatomy. He probably devised, and certainly presented, the silver caduceus now in the possession of Caius College as part of its insignia. He first gave it to the College of Physicians, and afterwards presented the London College with another.

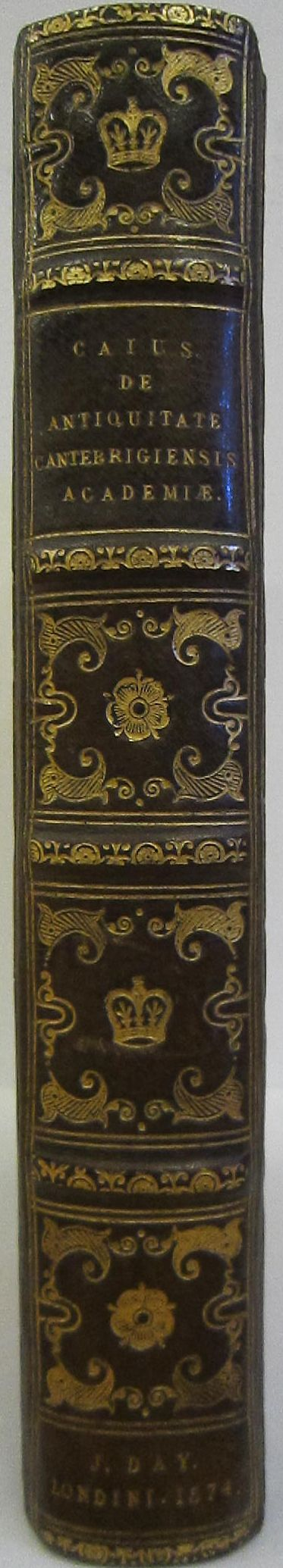
De antiquitate Cantebrigiensis Academiæ by John Caius

== Works ==
Caius was also a pioneer naturalist, prepared to make his own observations about nature rather than simply relying on accepted authorities. He was ready to make journeys about the country to see and record unusual animals. As such he could be considered also a pioneer of zoology, not yet recognised as a separate science.

He corresponded with the Swiss naturalist Conrad Gesner, with whom he had made friends while returning from Padua. He wrote a study of British dogs to send to Gesner as a contribution (not used) to Gesner's Historiae animalium, and also sent Gesner drawings of dogs, which were printed in later editions of Gesner's work. Caius' Catholic religious convictions did not prevent his friendship with the Protestant Gesner (indeed, the Historiae Animalium, to which Caius contributed, was under Pope Paul IV placed on the Roman Catholic Church's list of prohibited books).

His last literary production was a history of Cambridge University, Historia Cantabrigiensis Academiae (London, 1574).

== Bibliography ==
- Annals of the College from 1555 to 1572
- Translation of several of Galen's works, printed at different times abroad.
- Hippocrates de Medicamentis, first discovered and published by Dr Caius; also De Ratsone Vicius (Lov. 1556, 8vo)
- De Mendeti Methodo (Basel, 1554; London, 1556, Svo)
  - Reprint: Caius, John (1912) [1556]. Roberts, E. S. (ed.). De Mendendi Methodo (in Latin). Vol. Liber I, II. Cambridge: University Press. pp. 1–56.
- A Boke or Counseill against the Disease Called the Sweate, London 1552
  - Reprint: Caius, John (1912) [1552]. Roberts, E. S. (ed.). A Boke or Counseill against the Disease Called the Sweate or Sweatyng Sicknesse. Cambridge: University Press. pp. 1–36.
  - Reprint: Caius, John, A Boke or Counseill against the Disease Called the Sweate, London 1552. Facsimile ed., 1937, Scholars' Facsimiles & Reprints, ISBN 978-0-8201-1182-7.
- De Ephemera Britannica (Account of the Sweating Sickness in England) (London, 1556, 1721)
  - Reprint: Caius, John (1912) [1554]. Roberts, E. S. (ed.). De Ephemera Britannica (in Latin). Vol. Liber unus. Cambridge: University Press. pp. 57–115.
- History of the University of Cambridge (London, 1568, 8vo; 1574, 4to, in Latin)
  - Reprint: Caius, John (1912) [1574]. Roberts, E. S. (ed.). Historiae Cantebrigiensis Academie (in Latin). Vol. Liber I, II. Cambridge: University Press. pp. 1–116.
- De Thermis Britannicis; but it is doubtful whether this work was ever printed
- De Rariorum animalium atque stirpium historia, libellus.(Of Some Rare Plants and Animals) (London, 1570)
  - Reprint: Caius, John (1912) [1570]. Roberts, E. S. (ed.). De Rariorum animalium atque stirpium historia, Liber unus (in Latin). Cambridge: University Press. pp. 23–65.
    - Digital text: De Rariorum Animalium atque Stirpium Historia at Project Gutenberg
- De Canibus Britannicis (1570, 1729)
  - Reprint: Caius, John (1912) [1570]. Roberts, E. S. (ed.). De Canibus Britannicis (in Latin). Cambridge: University Press. pp. 1–19.
  - Of Englishe Dogges: The Diuersities, the Names, the Natures, and the Properties (London, 1576).
  - Reprint: Caius, John (1912) [1576]. Roberts, E. S. (ed.). Of Englishe Dogges: The Diuersities, the Names, the Natures, and the Properties. Translated by Fleming, Abraham. Cambridge: University Press. pp. 1–47.
- De Libris suis: De Libris propriis (London, 1570).
  - Reprint: Caius, John (1912) [1570]. Roberts, E. S. (ed.). De Libris suis (in Latin). Vol. 1. Cambridge: University Press. pp. 67–111.
- De Pronunciatione Graecae et Latinae Linguae (London, 1574)
  - Reprint: Caius, John (1912) [1574]. Roberts, E. S. (ed.). De Pronunciatione Graecae et Latinae Linguae cum scriptione nova libellus (in Latin). Cambridge: University Press. pp. 1–19.
    - Digital text: De Pronunciatione Graecae & Latinae Linguae at Project Gutenberg

== See also ==
- Thomas Caius, Master of University College, Oxford (1561–1572)
- Bloodhound

== Notes ==
Academic offices
Preceded by Thomas Bacon	Master of Gonville and Caius College; 1559–1573	Succeeded by Thomas Legge
