= Use of Sarum =

Latin liturgical use in Britain

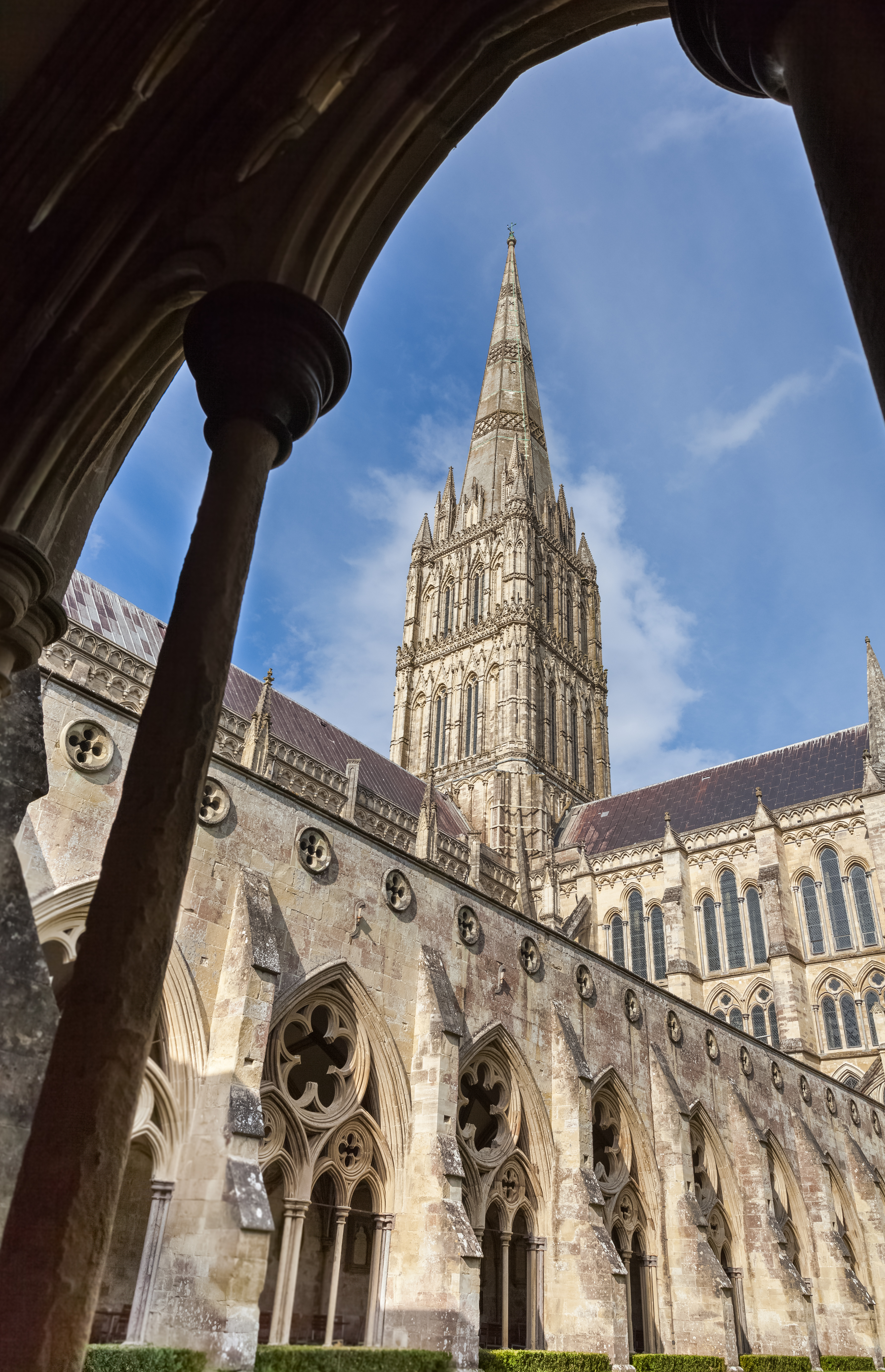
Salisbury Cathedral, which developed the Sarum Use in the Middle Ages.

The Use of Sarum (or Use of Salisbury, also known as the Sarum Rite) is the liturgical use of the Latin rites developed at Salisbury Cathedral and used from the late eleventh century until the English Reformation. It is largely identical to the Roman Rite, with about ten per cent of its material drawn from other sources. The cathedral's liturgy was widely respected during the late Middle Ages, and churches throughout the British Isles and parts of northwestern Europe adapted its customs for celebrations of the Eucharist and canonical hours. The Sarum Rite has a unique ecumenical position in influencing and being authorized for liturgical use by the Roman Catholic Church, Eastern Orthodox Church, as well as the Anglican Communion.

== Origins ==
A page from a Sarum missal. The woodcut shows an altar shortly before the English Reformation.

In 1078, William the Conqueror appointed Osmund, a Norman nobleman, as bishop of Salisbury (the period name of the site whose ruins are now known as Old Sarum). As bishop, Osmund initiated some revisions to the extant Celtic-Anglo-Saxon rite and the local adaptations of the Roman rite, drawing on both Norman and Anglo-Saxon traditions.

Nineteenth-century liturgists theorized that the liturgical practices of Rouen in northern France inspired the Sarum liturgical books. The Normans had deposed most of the Anglo-Saxon episcopate, replacing them with Norman bishops, of which Osmund was one. Given the similarities between the liturgy in Rouen and that of Sarum, it appears the Normans imported their French liturgical books as well.

The Use of Sarum refers not only to the text and rubrics of the Mass, but also the calendar of saints, feasts and fast days, the readings and other liturgical practices. For example, on Maundy Thursday individuals who had been excommunicated for serious sins and then confessed were publicly received back into communion in the Reconciliation of the Penitents ceremony.

== Dissemination ==
The revisions during Osmund's episcopate resulted in the compilation of a new missal, breviary, and other liturgical manuals, which came to be used throughout southern England, Wales, and parts of Ireland.

Some dioceses issued their own missals, inspired by the Sarum rite, but with their own particular prayers and ceremonies. Some of these are so different that they have been identified as effectively distinct liturgies, such as those of Hereford, York, Bangor, and Aberdeen. Other missals (such as those of Lincoln Cathedral or Westminster Abbey) were more evidently based on the Sarum rite and varied only in details.

Liturgical historians believe the Sarum rite had a distinct influence upon other usages of the Roman rite outside England, such as the Nidaros rite in Norway and the Braga Rite in Portugal. Following the siege of Lisbon in 1147, Gilbert of Hastings became the first bishop of the restored bishopric of Lisbon, and introduced the Sarum rite for the liturgy of the mass in his diocese, a use which continued until 1536, when the Cardinal-Infante Afonso of Portugal introduced the Roman rite as a response against the Anglican Schism. It has even been speculated that through Portuguese missionaries the Sarum Use might have even been used in the Congo.

== Sarum Mass ritual ==
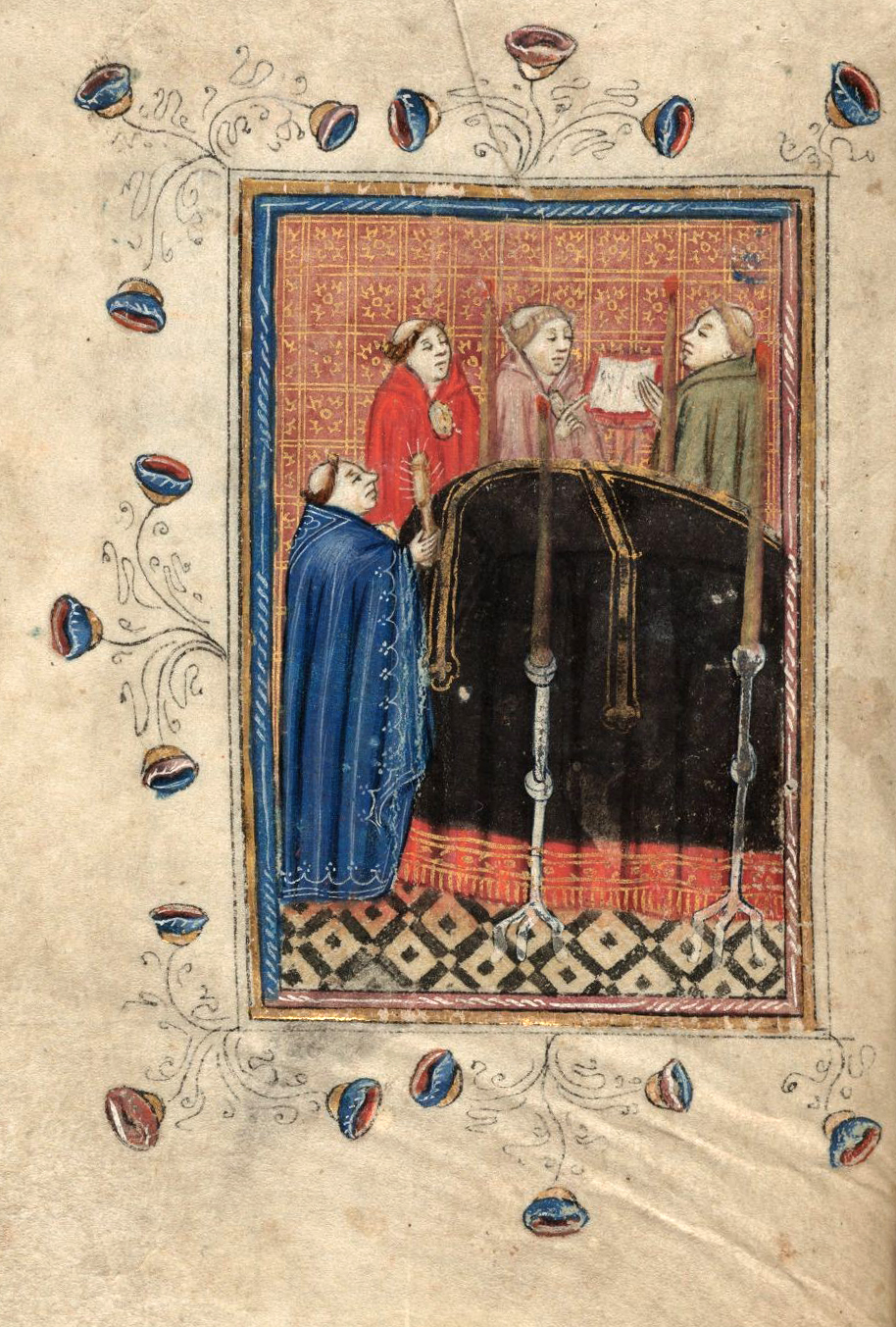
Illustration from a manuscript on the Sarum Rite, c. 1400

Masses according to the Use of Sarum were similar to the Tridentine Mass, both being adaptations of the Roman Rite from different periods with an almost identical Roman Canon, but with even more parts, lavishness and busy rubrics: there are eighty sequences for Sarum-use Masses but only five for Tridentine-use Masses. It had a high Mass and a low Mass.

The high Mass of Sundays and great feasts involved up to four sacred ministers: priest, deacon, subdeacon, and acolyte. It was customary for them to visit in procession all the altars of the church and cense them, ending at the great rood screen (or whatever barrier between the laity and the altar), where antiphons and collects would be sung. At the screen would be read the Bidding Prayers, prayers in the vernacular directing the people to pray for various intentions.

There was considerable variation from diocese to diocese, or even church to church, in the details of the rubrics: the place where the Epistle was sung, for instance, varied enormously; from a lectern at the altar, from a lectern in the quire, to the feature described as the 'pulpitum', a word used ambiguously for the place of reading (a pulpit) or for the rood screen. Some scholars thought that the readings were proclaimed from the top of the rood screen, which was most unlikely given the tiny access doors to the rood loft in most churches. This would not have permitted dignified access for a vested Gospel procession.

The procession then vested for Mass. Sarum had a well-developed series of colours of vestments for different feasts. There may have been tendencies to use a particular colour for a particular feast (red, for instance, was used on Sundays, as in the Ambrosian rite), but if a church were simply too poor to have several sets of vestments, they used what they had.

Some of the prayers of the Mass are unique, such as the priest's preparation prayers for Holy Communion. Some ceremonies differ from the Tridentine Mass, though they are not unknown in other forms of the western rites: the offering of the bread and wine was (as in the Dominican and other rites) made by one act. These distinctions have been evaluated as "of the most trifling character." The chalice was prepared between the readings of the Epistle and the Gospel. In addition, in common with the Ambrosian rite and many monastic rites, after the Elevation the celebrant stood with his arms outstretched in the form of a cross; the Particle was put into the chalice after the Agnus Dei. It is probable that communion under one kind was followed by a 'rinse' of unconsecrated wine. The first chapter of St John's Gospel was read while the priest made his way back to the sacristy. Two candles on the altar were customary, though others were placed around it and on the rood screen. The Sarum missal calls for a low bow as an act of reverence, rather than the genuflection.

Notably, there are no prayers or rubrics in the extant texts that show how communion was given to the laity.

== Modern period ==
=== English Reformation ===
Even after the Church of England was established separate from the Roman Catholic Church, the Canterbury Convocation declared in 1543 that the Sarum Breviary would be used for the canonical hours. Under Edward VI, the use provided the foundational material for the Book of Common Prayer and remains influential in English liturgies. Mary I restored the Use of Sarum in 1553, but it fell out of use under Elizabeth I. New priests arriving from Douai were trained in the new Tridentine Use (of the Missale Romanum), so the Use of Sarum, and its fasting requirements, waned by the end of the century.

Sarum Use remains a permitted use for Roman Catholics, as Pope Pius V permitted the continuation of uses more than two hundred years old under the apostolic constitution Quo primum. In practice, a brief resurgence of interest in the 19th century did not lead to a revival.

Some Western Rite Orthodox congregations have adopted the use due to its antiquity and similarities with the Byzantine Rite. This includes Western Rite members of the Russian Orthodox Church Outside Russia, as well as the Old Calendarist Autonomous Orthodox Metropolia of North and South America and the British Isles.

In spite of interest in the Sarum Use, its publication in Latin sources from the sixteenth century and earlier has inhibited its modern adoption. Several academic projects are gradually improving its accessibility. From 2009 to 2013, Bangor University produced a series of films and other resources as part of The Experience of Worship research project. In 2006, McMaster University launched an ongoing project to create an edition and English translation of the complete Sarum Use with its original plainsong, resulting in the publication of more than 10,000 musical works, and expected to be completed in 2022.

=== Influence on Anglo-Catholic Anglican liturgy ===
The Rite of Sarum has influence even among Western Christian churches that do not use its text, obscuring understanding of the original:

The modern fame of the Use of Sarum is to a great extent an accidental product of the political and religious preoccupations of 19th-century English ecclesiastics and ecclesiologists. The Use certainly deserves attention and respect as an outstanding intellectual achievement, but it is far from unique, and the fascination that it has exerted still threatens to limit rather than increase our understanding of the medieval English Church.

Many of the ornaments and ceremonial practices associated with the Sarum rite—though not the full liturgy itself—were revived in the Anglican Communion in the late 19th and early 20th centuries, as part of the Anglo-Catholic Oxford Movement in the Church of England. Some Anglo-Catholics wanted to find a traditional formal liturgy that was characteristically "English" rather than "Roman." They took advantage of the 'Ornaments Rubric' of 1559, which directed that English churches were to use "...such Ornaments of the Church, and of the Ministers thereof, at all Times of their Ministration, shall be retained, and be in use, as were in this Church of England, by the Authority of Parliament, in the Second Year of the Reign of Edward VI of England," i.e. January 1548 - January 1549, before the First Prayer Book came into effect in June of the latter year (which authorized the use of traditional vestments and was quite explicit that the priest shall wear an alb, vestment (chasuble) or cope and that the deacons shall be vested in albs and tunicles (dalmatics). However, there was a tendency to read back Victorian centralizing tendencies into mediaeval texts, and so a rather rubrical spirit was applied to liturgical discoveries.

Chief among the proponents of Sarum customs was the Anglican priest Percy Dearmer, who put these into practice (according to his own interpretation) at his parish of St Mary the Virgin, Primrose Hill, in London. He explained them at length in The Parson's Handbook, which ran through several editions. This style of worship has been retained in some present-day Anglican churches and monastic institutions, where it is known as "English Use" (Dearmer's term) or "Prayer Book Catholicism".

=== Modern influence on Catholic liturgies ===
Several prayers from the Use of Sarum were incorporated by the Roman Catholic Church into a liturgy specifically established for former Anglicans converting to Roman Catholicism, now in communion with the bishop of Rome. One example being the Collect for Purity, which can be found in Divine Worship: The Missal (the missal in use in the Personal Ordinariates for former Anglicans converted to the Roman Catholic Church).

== In popular culture ==
- Edith Wharton refers to the "Sarum Rule" in Book I of her 1905 novel The House of Mirth.
