= Dissolution of Colleges Act 1545 =

Act of the Parliament of England

Dissolution of Colleges Act 1545 (Note: The citation of this act by this short title was authorised by section 5 of, and the second schedule to, the Statute Law Revision Act 1948. Due to the repeal of those provisions, it is now authorised by section 19(2) of the Interpretation Act 1978.)
- Act of Parliament
- Parliament of England
- Long title: An Acte for dissolucion of Colledges. (Note: These words are printed against this act in the second column of the second schedule to the Statute Law Revision Act 1948, which is headed "Title".)
- Citation: 37 Hen. 8. c. 4
- Territorial extent: England and Wales

Dates
- Royal assent: 24 December 1545
- Commencement: 23 November 1545 (Note: Start of session.)
- Repealed: 1 January 1970

Other legislation
- Repealed by: Statute Law Revision Act 1950; Statute Law (Repeals) Act 1969
- Relates to: Dissolution of Colleges Act 1547

Status: Repealed

Text of statute as originally enacted

The Dissolution of Colleges Act 1545 or the Abolition of Chantries Act 1545 (37 Hen. 8. c. 4) was an act of the Parliament of England.

== Subsequent developments ==
Sections 13 and 16 were repealed by section 1(1) of, and the first schedule to, the Statute Law Revision Act 1950 (14 Geo. 6. c. 6), which came into force on 23 May 1950.

The whole act, so far as unrepealed, was repealed by section 1 of, and part II of the schedule to, the Statute Law (Repeals) Act 1969, which came into force on 1 January 1970.

== See also ==
- Chantry § Abolition of Chantries Acts, 1545 and 1547
