= Use of York =

Medieval English Catholic liturgical rite

The Use of York (Latin: Eboracum) or York Rite was a liturgical use of the Roman Rite – itself a Latin liturgical rite – practised in part of northern England, prior to the reign of Henry VIII. During Henry's reign the Use of York was suppressed in favour of the Use of Sarum, developed at Salisbury Cathedral, followed by the Book of Common Prayer. "Use" denotes the special liturgical customs which prevailed in a particular diocese or group of dioceses; it is one of the medieval English uses, together with the Use of Sarum, the Use of Hereford, and the Use of Bangor.

== Origin ==
It was a received principle in medieval canon law that while judicial matters, the sacraments, and the more solemn fasts were to adhere to the custom of the Catholic Church, in the matter of church services (divina officia) each particular Church kept to its own traditions (see the Decretum Gratiani, d. 12, c. iv).

== Distinctive features ==
While following the Roman Rite and the Sarum Use in main form, the Use of York had a number of distinctive features.

In the celebration of Mass, before the proclamation of the Gospel the priest blessed the deacon with these words (in Latin): "May the Lord open thy mouth to read and our ears to understand God's holy Gospel of peace," whereupon the deacon answered: "Give, O Lord, a proper and well-sounding speech to my lips that my words may please Thee and may profit all who hear them for Thy name's sake unto eternal life. Amen."

Moreover, at the end of the Gospel the priest said quietly (in Latin): "Blessed is he that cometh in the name of the Lord." Again, while reproducing in general the features of the Sarum offertory, the York Use required the priest to wash his hands twice: once before touching the altar bread and again after using the incense, while at the latter washing the priest prayed the words of the hymn "Veni Creator Spiritus".

In response to the appeal "Orate fratres et sorores" (pray brothers and sisters) the choir replied by singing, in a low voice, the first three verses of Psalm 19, "Exaudiat te Dominus". In another departure from the Sarum custom, the priest in giving the kiss of peace at York said, "Habete vinculum" ("Retain ye the bond of charity and peace that ye may be fit for the sacred mysteries of God") instead of "Pax tibi et ecclesiae" ("Peace to thee and the Church").

There were also differences in the prayers which immediately preceded the receiving of Holy Communion, and the formulae used in the actual reception of the Sacrament by the priest were again peculiar to York. Further, the number of sequences retained in the York Missal considerably exceeded that of those printed in the Sarum book. A list is given by Walter Frere in the Jour. Theol. Stud., II, 583. Some metrical compositions, bearing a resemblance to the Carmelite "O Flos Carmeli", figure among the offertories (see Frere, loc. Cit., 585.).

=== Breviary ===
In the breviary, York employed a larger number of proper hymns than Sarum. There were also a number of minor variations from what was practised both by Sarum and Rome. A careful comparison of the psalms, antiphons, responsories and lessons prescribed respectively by Rome, Sarum, and York for such a festival as that of St. Lawrence reveals a general and often close resemblance; yet, there were many slight divergences. Thus in the first Vespers the psalms used both at York and Sarum were the ferial psalms (as against the Roman usage), but York retained the ferial antiphons while Sarum had proper antiphons. So the capitulum was the same but the responsory following was different. Again the psalms, antiphons, and responsories at Matins were substantially the same, but they do not always occur in the same order. Both at York and Sarum the first six lessons were taken from the legend of the saint of the day, but were differently worded and arranged. The most singular feature, and one common to both Sarum and York on St. Lawrence and one or two other festivals (notably that of the Conversion of St. Paul and the Feast of the Holy Trinity) was the use of antiphons with versicles attached to each. This feature is called in the Aurea Legenda "regressio antiphonarum" and in Caxton's translation "the reprysyng of the anthemys".

The contents of the manual and the remaining service-books show other distinctive peculiarities; for example the form of troth-plighting in the York marriage-service runs:

Here I take thee N. to my wedded wife, to have and to hold at bed and at board, for fairer for fouler, for better for worse, in sickness and in health, till death us do part and thereto I plight thee my troth.

in which may be specially noticed the absence of the words "... if the holy Church it will ordain" which are found in the Sarum Rite.

Again, in the delivery of the ring, the bridegroom at York said: "With this ring I wed thee, and with this gold and silver I honour thee, and with this gift I dower thee"

where again one misses the familiar "with my body I thee worship", a retention which may still be used in both the Catholic and Protestant marriage services in the United Kingdom.

Also the York rubric prescribes: "Here let the priest ask the woman's dowry and if land be given her for her dowry then let her fall at the feet of her husband."

This feature is entirely lacking in all but one or two of the Sarum books. The only other York peculiarity is the mention of the Blessed Virgin in the form for the administration of extreme unction:

Per istam sanctam unctionem et suam piissimam misericordiam et per intercessionem beatae Mariae Virginis et omnium Sanctorum, indulgeat tibi Dominus quidquid peccastic per visum. Amen.

Naturally, York had its own liturgical calendar and special feasts; they are set out at length in Dr. Henderson's edition of the York Missal (pp. 259 sqq and especially p. 271). The Visitation was kept at York on 2 April, a date which seems to agree better with the Gospel narrative than the present Summertime observance. As for the colours of vestments, York is said to have used white for Christmas, Easter, Palm Sunday, and possibly for Whitsuntide, as well as on feasts of the Blessed Virgin, whilst black was used for Good Friday and blue for Advent and Septuagesima (see St. John Hope in "Trans. T. Paul's Eccles. Society", II, 268, and cf. I, 125).
