= Timeline of the English Reformation =

This is a timeline of the English Protestant Reformation. It assumes the reformation spans the period between 1527 and the death of Elizabeth I in 1603. It also provides sections for background events prior to 1527 and the events of the Long Reformation beginning in 1603. Since the six dioceses of the Church in Wales were part of the Church of England prior to Welsh Church Act 1914 this timeline covers the reformation history of both Wales and England.

== Background ==
=== Lollardy ===
Date	Event	Significance to the Reformation in England
c. 1328	Birth of John Wycliffe in Yorkshire.	Ordained in September 1351, Master of Balliol College in 1360, Warden of Canterbury College in 1365 and Rector of St Mary's, Lutterworth from 1374, John Wycliffe is earliest known teacher of evangelical ideas in England and a translator of the Bible into the vernacular Middle English. He is popularly known as the morning star or stella matutina of the English Reformation and both he and his followers (the Lollards) were much invoked by later reformers. While Lollard influence on the Henrician Reformation was negligible, nevertheless Wycliffe's writings did influence Jan Hus who in turn influenced Martin Luther. The Lollards are also a key topic of Foxes Book of Martyrs and their story did much to solidify the self understanding of the 16th century reformers.
1348-1350	The Black Death ravages England.	Considered to have been a major influence on the ideas of both Wycliffe and many other proto-Protestants.
c. 1377	Wycliffe published De civili dominio	A scathing attack on church property and tithes. Set out Wycliffe's ideas of dominion, the notion that the church should not have any property and that no member of its clergy should exercise political or judicial power.
1377	Wycliffe is censured by Pope Gregory XI who orders church authorities in Oxford and London to begin an inquisition.	
1377, 19 February	John Wycliffe summonsed by William Courtenay, Bishop of London, for an examination of heresy. In attending he was accompanied and supported by John of Gaunt, Henry Percy, Earl Marshal of England, and four theologians representing the four major mendicant orders (Franciscans, Dominicans, Carmelites, and Augustinians). The session ended in aporia over a question of etiquette, concerning whether Wycliffe should stand or be allowed to sit during his testimony.	The event showed how useful Wycliffe's theories might be to the aristocracy who had good political reason to support reformers undermining the power and wealth of the church. The English monarchs also had a strained relationship with the Avignon Papacy and its supporters, the French monarchy, because of the ongoing conflict of the 100 Years War. For these reasons and others, in the early days of Wycliffite Lollardy many of the institutions of secular authority were supportive. John of Gaunt, Duke of Lancaster, was a strong supporter of Wycliffe in the early days as too was Joan of Kent. In 1382 the Mayor of Leicester personally attended the sermon of the Lollard William Swinderby. The ideas Wycliffe was under investigation for would return as a major theme of the 16th century reformation when the idea of a secular requisition of church property would again prove popular with authorities.
c. 1378	Wycliffe published De veritate sacrae scripturae	Suggested that only theological conclusions with direct scriptural backing ought to be accepted. A momentous publication foreshadowing the idea of sola scriptura which would dominate the later reforms of the 16th century.
c. 1379	Wycliffe published De Eucharistia	An attack on the doctrine of transubstantiation and its lack of scriptural warrant. Wycliffe maintained a firm belief in the real presence but rejected the use of Aristotelian metaphysics to explain it. His convictions were closer to Orthodoxy, Lutheranism, or the modern Church of England after the Oxford Movement than those of the 16th century reformers.
1381, 30 May	Peasants' Revolt begins.	Originating from dissatisfaction with taxes and rigid class hierarchy this rebellion did much to spread Wycliffite and more general Lollard thought among the ordinary population.
1381, 13 June	John Ball preached his famous Blackheath sermon during the Peasants Revolt.	John Ball's career suggests that Wycliffe was merely the first man of rank in the university to express more widespread discontent.
1382, May 21	Earthquake Synod at Blackfriars, London condemns Wycliffe's teachings	
1382, 17 November	Anti-Wycliffe Synod at Oxford	Wycliffe defiantly reasserts his positions in a famous oration and is exiled to his Rectory at Lutterworth on the Leicestershire, Warwickshire boundary.
1382	Englands first Heresy Act passed as a result of a request from Pope Martin IV and repealed the following year.	It required mayors and magistrates to burn those found guilty of heresy by a bishop. A highly controversial act it was repealed the following year due the objection of members of the House of Commons showing the widespread opposition to the bill among the burghers
c. 1383	Philip Repyngdon is deprived of his position at Oxford for defending Wycliffe's teachings.	Repyngdon was later made Abbot of Leicester in 1394 and Bishop of Lincoln in 1404 and was elevated to the rank of Cardinal. This shows that Wycliffe's thought had a wide influence even in the church hierarchy.
1384	Wycliffe's Bible probably completed around this time. Wycliffe also dies this year on Holy Innocents' Day (28 December)	Earliest complete translation of the Latin Vulgate into English.
1395	Twelve Conclusions of the Lollards presented to Parliament and posted on the doors of Westminster Abbey and Old St Paul's	
1399	Henry IV overthrew Richard II.	This brought an end to the relative tolerance of Lollardy.
1401	De heretico comburendo is passed by parliament which required forfeiture of all property, both for themselves and for their children, for all those found in position of copies of Wycliffe's Bible or some part of it.	A major blow to the Lollard movement.
1410, 1 March	John Badby burned at the stake Smithfield for denying transubstantiation.	
1414, 9 January	Oldcastle Revolt	Small popular uprising inspired by Lollard ideals.
1414, 30 April	Opening session of the Fire and Faggot Parliament. Symbolically the Parliament was held at the Greyfriars monastery in Leicester, a town which had been stronghold of Lollardy, the seat of John of Gaunt, standing around 15 mile north east of Wycliffe's home and grave at Lutterworth.	The Parliament which passed the Suppression of Heresy Act in response to Lollardy. This act was used to justify the burning of many Lollards and many more radical reformers during the reign of Henry VIII. It was one of the acts restored by Mary I’s Revival of the Heresy Acts.

=== Background events 1485-1525 ===
Date	Event	Significance to the Reformation in England
1485, 22 August	Death of Richard III and acclamation of Henry VII as King at the Battle of Bosworth Field in Leicestershire.	Henry's usurpation of Richard ended 331 years of Plantagenet rule, concluded the Wars of the Roses by uniting the two subsidiary Plantagenet Houses of York and Lancaster through his marriage to Elizabeth of York, and thereby initiated the Tudor dynasty. The Tudor monarchs would come to enable the English Reformation, chiefly Henry VII's son Henry VIII and his grandchildren Edward VI and Elizabeth I.
1485, 16 December	Birth of Catherine of Aragon to Ferdinand and Isabella at the Archbishop’s Palace of Alcalá in Madrid.	Fourth daughter and sixth child of the celebrated Catholic Monarchs, the founders of the united kingdoms of Castile and Leon, the forerunner of the modern Kingdom of Spain, and the Spanish Empire. Catherine was a Habsburg, the younger sister of Joanna and later aunt of Joanna's son Charles V. In 1496 she would be betrothed to Arthur, Prince of Wales, son of Henry VII forming an alliance between England and Castile and Leon. Following Arthur's death, her betrothal was switched to Henry VII's other son, Prince Henry, who married her after becoming king Henry VIII. The couple's difficulties with fertility partly precipitated the Annulment Crisis of the late 1520s and early 30s and the ensuing English Reformation of the mid 1530s on.
1486, 19/20 September	Birth of Arthur, Prince of Wales to Henry VII and Elizabeth of York at Winchester Cathedral Priory.	His espousal to the infant Princess Catherine brought her to England and his untimely death in 1502 at just 15 years old will lead to both his younger brother Henry's accession to the English throne and his espousal and marriage to Catherine.
1489, 2 July	Birth of Thomas Cranmer at Aslockton, Nottinghamshire.	Future Archbishop of Canterbury and principal leader among the reforming churchman during both the Henrician and Edwardian reformations. Martyred by Mary I.
1491, 28 June	Birth of Prince Henry at Greenwich Palace.	The future King Henry VIII, the monarch whose marital difficulties with Catherine of Aragon will lead him to overthrow Papal Supremacy in the Church of England. His reforms will be responsible for the deaths of many thousands of Catholic martyrs and rebels opposing his reforms and over 60 Protestant martyrs pushing for further reform.
c. 1494	Birth of William Tyndale in Gloucestershire.	Became a leading theologian of the early English Reformation through his work The Obedience of a Christian Man and its first major Bible translator since John Wycliffe responsible for the Tyndale Bible translations.
1496	Catherine of Aragon's hand secured for Arthur, Prince of Wales, son of Henry VII.	Brought Catherine of Aragon to England.
1499-1500	The celebrated humanist and renaissance thinker Erasmus made his first visit to England (see Erasmus: First visit to England).	The Renaissance Humanist scholar Desiderius Erasmus of Rotterdam was a pillar of the New Learning, a key inspiration for many reformers and, while remaining a faithful Roman Catholic, articulated many of the criticisms of the Pre-Reformation Church that they shared. Notably he visits Oxford and Cambridge Universities where his ideas spread.
1501, 14 November	Arthur, Prince of Wales marries Catherine of Aragon at Old St Paul's Cathedral in a nuptial mass celebrated by Henry Deane, Archbishop of Canterbury.	
1502, 2 April	Arthur dies of tuberculosis at Ludlow Castle in Shropshire.	Arthur’s death lead to the accession of his younger brother Prince Henry following Henry VII's death, his brother's betrothal and eventual marriage to Catherine of Aragon, and in turn the annulment crisis, the Henrician Reformation, and the subsequent Edwardian and Elizabethan reforms.
1503	Henry VII, fearful of the loss of Catherine's substantial dowery, has her betrothed to his younger son, Prince Henry, later Henry VIII.	This precipitates the later annulment crisis
1503, December	Julius II issues a formal Papal Dispensation permitting the marriage between Catherine and Henry to allay fears around the legality of marrying a brothers widow.	
1509, 22 April	Henry VII dies and Henry VIII accedes to the throne.	As a result of Henry VIII's marital problems and at the suggestion of reformers close to him he secured the independence of the Church of England from the rest of the Latin Church and the end of papal supremacy in England and Wales. This only had consequences for church property and monastic communities while Henry lived and he held back reform of soteriology or eucharistic theology until his death in 1547. After his death the Royal Supremacy enables Thomas Cranmer and other radical churchmen under his son Edward VI to undertake a full Protestant reformation of the established church.
1509, 11 June	Henry VIII marries Catherine of Aragon in the Church of the Observant Friars at Greenwich Palace.	Henry and Catherine's failure to produce a healthy male child surviving past infancy precipitated the annulment crisis and the overthrow of Papal Supremacy in the Church of England.
1509, 24 June	Coronation of Henry VIII and Queen Catherine at Westminster Abbey.	
1510, 31 Jan	Queen Catherine miscarried a daughter.	First of Queen Catherine's 6 pregnancies and the first of her 4 failed pregnancies.
1511, 1 Jan	Queen Catherine gave birth to a son at Richmond Palace and he was named Prince Henry, Henry VIII's firstborn legitimate son.	A major step in securing the otherwise fairly weak Tudor succession. Second of Queen Catherine's pregnancies.
1511, 22 Feb	Prince Henry dies at Richmond Palace and was buried in Westminster Abbey a few days later on the 27th.	A major blow to Henry and Catherine both personally and constitutionally. Prince Henry will prove to be the only surviving male birth produced by Henry and Catherine and in time his death and the subsequent still births of more sons brought about both Henry's paranoia that his marriage to Catherine was cursed by God due to her earlier marriage to his late brother Prince Arthur and his desperation to seek an annulment and a new bride.
1511	Agnes Grebill burned for Lollardy together with four other female Lollards at Chelmsford in Essex.	Shows that Wycliffite sympathies still lingered before the explosion of the New Learning and Lutheran ideas.
1513, September	Queen Catherine gave birth to a stillborn son.	Third of Queen Catherine's pregnancies and her second failed pregnancy
1514, November	Queen Catherine gives birth to a stillborn boy.	Fourth of Queen Catherine's pregnancies and her third failed pregnancy.
1516	First edition of Erasmus's Greek New Testament published.	Had an enormous impact on biblical translation both into English and other languages.
1516, 18 February	Princess Mary born at Greenwich Palace.	The future Queen (1553–1558) who would reverse the Edwardian and Henrician Reformations restoring the Church of England to full communion with the Pope and earn the title "Bloody Mary" for her execution by burning of over 300 Protestants. Fifth of Queen Catherine's 6 pregnancies and the only child to survive into adulthood.
31 October 1517	Martin Luther posts his 95 Theses on the door of a church in Wittenberg, Germany, formally beginning the Protestant Reformation	Luther's protest was a landmark moment for all of Europe. In England news of his protest and his theology of sola fide and sola scriptura had a significant impact, especially in Cambridge and in towns where the ideas of Lollardy had remained strong.
1518, 10 November	Queen Catherine gave birth to a stillborn daughter.	The last of Queen Catherine's 6 pregnancies and the fourth failed pregnancy. This final failed pregnancy and Catherine's age (she turned 33 a month later on the 16th) pushed Henry to despair of his marriages success.
c. 1521	A group of Cambridge University reformers begin meeting at the White Horse Inn to discuss Luther and other theories of reformation coming from the continent.	According to John Foxe William Tyndale, Miles Coverdale, Thomas Cranmer, Hugh Latimer, Robert Barnes, Thomas Bilney, Matthew Parker, Nicholas Shaxton, and John Bale were among those who attended. Recent scholarship has suggested that the White Horse Inn meetings of Foxes account may be later hagiography. However it is the case that a large number of Cambridge students all present in the 1520s played significant roles in later reforms.
1521	Assertio Septem Sacramentorum was published as Henry's own work. Pope Leo X rewards him by granting him the title Fidei Defensor or "Defender of the Faith"	The publication of this intensely orthodox work constrained Henry's commitment to reformation in the years ahead.
c. 1523	Reformation in Zürich under the leadership of Ulrich Zwingli.	Together with Lutheranism, Zwinglianism was to have a major impact on the ideas of English reformers, whose thoughts represented a middle way, "via media" between the two.
1524, May	William Tyndale excommunicated.	
1525	Cardinal Wolsey suppresses 29 monasteries aided by Thomas Cromwell.	Provided a papally approved orthodox precedent for the later more widespread Dissolution of the Monasteries.
1525	The New Testament of the Tyndale Bible (in English) is published in Worms, Germany.	Although banned in England, Tyndale's work heavily influenced subsequent approved Bible translations.
1525	Reformation in Strasbourg.	Lead by Martin Bucer, this reformation came to be perhaps the most influential of all those in city states of the Holy Roman Empire and Swiss Confederacy on the English reforms. The reformed church in Strasbourg cut a middle way, "via media", between Martin Luther's developing sacramental high church Protestantism and Ulrich Zwingli's low church views. Bucer would have a direct influence on Cranmer's reforms of the Church of England under Edward VI, during which time he came to England and remaining until his death, in Cambridge in 1551. He a direct hand in the composition and editing of the Book of Common Prayer.
1525, Summer-Autumn	Henry VIII meets Anne Boleyn and falls in love with her.	The king had previously conducted an affair with Mary Boleyn, Anne's older sister. The combination of the repeated fertility problems Henry had experienced with Catherine of Aragon and his infatuation with Anne will lead to the king suing for annulment to the Pope and undertaking ecclesiastical and constitutional reform when his case is refused.
1525, 24 December	Robert Barnes O.E.S.A, Prior of Cambridge Austin Friars, preached what is considered the first sermon of the Protestant reformation in England at Midnight Mass in the Church of St Edward King and Martyr, Cambridge.	First open deed of the growing Protestant movement at Cambridge University.

=== Annulment Crisis ===
Date	Event	Significance to the Reformation in England
c. 1526-7	Henry VIII sure of intentions to separate from his Queen, Catherine of Aragon.	This intention arose from repeated fertility problems with Queen Catherine, especially her failure to produce a surviving baby boy, and his growing infatuation with Anne Boleyn, who insisted on marriage before sleeping with him. It initiated first a series of attempts to secure an annulment of the marriage by existing Papal and English Ecclesiastical methods and when these failed the summoning of the Reformation Parliament, a series of anti papal and anti clerical laws, and ultimately the Act of Supremacy. The process would also see the fall of two of Henry's chief ministers, Cardinal Wolsey and Thomas More.
1527, 6-8 May	Sack of Rome by supposedly mutinous and unpaid troops of Charles V, Catherine of Aragon's nephew. Occupation continued until July and resolution between the Holy See and the Holy Roman Empire wasn't reached until June 1528.	A catastrophic event in the history of Rome during which the city was desecrated and Pope Clement VII was besieged in the Castel Sant'Angelo. This put the Papacy at mercy of the Holy Roman Empire and the powerful Habsburg Dynasty, of which Catherine of Aragon was a member, especially during the crucial period of the Clement's embattlement between the beginning of the siege and his departure from the Castel in December 1527. During treaty negotiations, Charles V did much to dissuade the pope from accepting Henry's annulment arguments, towards which he had previously expressed some openness to Cardinal Wolsey.
1527, 17-27 May	Series of secret meetings held at York Place (later the Palace of Whitehall) to examine justifications for an annulment of Henry and Catherine's Marriage.	The meetings were between the Archbishops of York and Canterbury, Cardinal Wolsey and William Warham, and Henry himself and represent the first formal proceedings of the King's attempt to secure a separation from Catherine. Their discussions centered on the legitimacy of Julius II's dispensation for Henry and Catherine's marriage issued in 1503 and the relative importance in canon law of two contradictory Biblical verses. These were a verse of the Kedoshim from the Book of Leviticus: "if a man shall take his brother’s wife, it is an unclean thing: he hath uncovered his brother’s nakedness; they shall be childless"; and its contrary, from a text known as the Yibbum in the Book of Deuteronomy: "If brethren dwell together, and one of them die, and have no child, the wife of the dead shall not marry without unto a stranger: her husband’s brother shall go in unto her, and take her to him to wife, and perform the duty of an husband’s brother unto her." The outcome of the debates was inconclusive however Wolsey was instructed to continue proceedings towards an annulment.
1527, 22 June	Henry summoned his Queen to inform her that their marriage was illegitimate. Catherine sobbed but had been forewarned of his intentions and defended her position saying she would await the judgement of the church.	The two were already estranged by this point and had likely ceased all marital intimacy in around 1524.
1527, November	Group of theological, ethical, biblical, and canon law scholars gathered at Hampton Court Palace to discuss the legitimacy of the King Henry and Queen Catherine's marriage.	This made the hitherto private annulment scandal (known as The Kings Great Matter) a matter of public knowledge.
1528	William Tyndale published The Obedience of a Christian Man, a central text of the English Reformation.	An apology for Caesaropapism, this text came into Henry's hands at a moment of personal conflict with church authority and thereby struck a chord with the monarch. While abhorring most of Tyndale's theology the arguments in Obedience came to inspire Henry's policy of overturning Papal supremacy in the Church of England and establishing Royal Supremacy (caresaropapiam) in its place. Tyndale for his part would later state his opposition to Henry's separation from Catherine of Aragon.
1529, 31 May	Opening session of the Blackfriars Legatine Court, a Legatine council held at London Blackfriars chaired by Thomas Wolsey, acting in the capacity of Papal Legate to England, and Lorenzo Campeggio, the Cardinal Protector of England.	The court was convened to formally rule on the legitimacy of Julius II's 1503 dispensation and consequently the relative importance of Leviticus 20:21 and Deuteronomy 25:5 (quoted above). In the course of its sessions it would hear pleas from both Henry and Catherine.
1529, 22 June	Queen Catherine gave a famous speech to her husband in defense of her position to the Legatine Court and, refusing to recognise any authority except the Pope's alone, immediately left the great hall at Blackfriars in protest.	The speech drew much sympathy entered the annals of English history as one of the great speeches of the Tudor Age.
1529, 18 July	Clement VII issues a revocation of the right to rule on the annulment dispute from the Legatine Court to Rome. His order would take around two weeks to arrive in London.	Effectively ends all English hopes of a solution to the Great Matter by recourse to Papally approved channels and, from Henry's perspective, necessitated the summing of the Reformation Parliament and both its initial campaign of anti clerical and anti papal sanctions and its later reforming legislation.
1529, 30 July	Closing session of the Blackfriars Legatine Court after Cardinal Campeggio had declared a summer adjournment on the 23rd.	The court ended without resolving the question and before it reconvened Clement VII's writ of revocation arrived.
1529, 9 August	Writs issued summoning the Fifth Parliament of Henry VIII's reign to help solve the Annulment Crisis. It will come to be known as the Reformation Parliament.	Likely the result of the arrival of Clement VII's revocation of the case to Rome. This marked the beginning of a targeted campaign of anti clerical and anti papal sanctions which gradually evolved into a campaign of reformation legislation as Henry came under the influence of less conservative ministers and grew more impatient for his marriage to Anne.
1529, 1–4 October	Marburg Colloquy	Synod to discuss the differences between Lutheran and Zwinglian positions on the Real presence of Christ in the Eucharist. Will define the essential opposition between the soft Lutheran and hard Reformed eucharistic theologies. While the English church will tend to an even more conservative view than Luther under Henry VIII it will adopt a generally Reformed theology under Edward. Elizabeth will reintroduce certain prayers that allow a latitudinarian toleration of both parties leading to the modern Church of England's essential division on the eucharistic question (see Eucharist in Anglicanism).
1529, 9 October	Wolsey charged under the Statute of Praemunire (see praemunire). He was thereby made a civil outlaw in England and was obliged to forfeit personal property.	Wolsey's charge of praemunire and subsequent outlawry was the legal mechanism whereby the king disbarred him from his seat in the House of Lords and acquired his significant personal estates, most notably Hampton Court Palace and York Place (later Whitehall Palace). Its use in this case effectively defined the Papacy and other structures of the Latin Church as foreign to England (contrary to most hitherto existent opinion) and foreshadowed the Statute in Restraint of Appeals. This marked the moment Cardinal Wolsey fell from favour as Henry's chief minister.
1529, 26 October	Thomas Wolsey removed as Lord Chancellor.	An l consequence of his outlawry.
1529, 3 November	State Opening of the first session of the Fifth Parliament of Henry's reign (known to history as the Reformation Parliament).	The first session of the assembly responsible for most of the legislation underpinning the Henrician Reformation, most notably the Supplication against the Ordinaries, the Statute in Restraint of Appeals, the Act Concerning Ecclesiastical Appointments and Absolute Restraint of Annates, the Act Concerning Peter's Pence and Dispensations, and most importantly Henry's Act of Supremacy. It sat for an unusually lengthy total of nine sessions and was dissolved only in spring 1536.
1530	William Tyndale published The Practice of Prelates declaring his opposition to Henry's divorce proceedings and his belief that the Kings marriage to Catherine of Aragon was valid in Protestant eyes.	Shows that the authentic reformed tradition did not approve of Henry's justification for supremacy (securing an irregular annulment). Henry in his turn did much to suppress radical reformed thinkers and maintained a highly conservative theological position in the Church of England once he had secured supremacy.
1530	Thomas Cromwell, (pronounced Cromell) part of the inner ring of Henry's Privy Council. He had previously been in the service of Cardinal Wolsey of whom he remained deeply fond until his own execution a decade later.	Chief bureaucratic architect of the Henrician Reformation. He would come to be responsible for drafting the legal framework that overturned papal supremacy and established royal supremacy over the Church of England. He later oversaw the dissolution of the monasteries.
1530, 23 February	Thomas Hitton executed by burning at Maidstone in Kent.	Considered to be the first execution of a Protestant of the new Continental reformed model (as opposed to Lollards) in the English reformation.
1530, April	Cardinal Wolsey returns to his episcopal seat at York.	A response to both personal health problems and his homelessness in London following his charge of praemunire including his forfeiture of property and loss of place in both the Privy Council and House of Lords.
1530, Summer	Writs of Praemunire issued against 15 churchmen - including William Warham, John Fisher, John Clerk, and John Stokesley - who had recognised the Legatine Court of 1529 or appealed to Papal authority by other means.	Placed them in a state of civil outlawry under which their personal property was forfeited to the Crown and they were prevented from speaking in the House of Lords. The use of praemunire in these cases effectively defined the Papacy and other Roman Catholic structures as foreign to England and foreshadowed the Statute in Restraint of Appeals which in 1533 would strengthen the existing Statute of Praemunire.
1530, 29 November	Cardinal Wolsey died at Leicester Abbey of dysentery on his journey to London and imprisonment in the Tower.	His sudden death likely spared him the fate of execution. His lost grave at Leicester Abbey (dissolved in 1538) is commemorated by a 20th century memorial.
1531	Henry revives ancient claim of English monarchs to the British imperium maius.	A revival of an ancient royal claim to supreme authority over both secular and ecclesiastical matters within the realm. This claim challenged papal jurisdiction and invoked the right of secular rulers to govern religious policy. Part of a series of strategies initially mustered to help in the Annulment Crisis but which ended up enabling the Reformation.
1531, 19 August	Thomas Bilney executed by burning at Lollards Pit in Norwich, Norfolk.	One of the many Protestants executed for maintaining reformed theology during Henry's reign.
1532	The Duke of Norfolk and the Duke of Suffolk fall from royal favour.	The temporary fall from favour of Norfolk and Suffolk weakened the conservative pro papal faction at court, reducing opposition to Henry VIII’s religious and political reforms. Their diminished influence cleared the way for reformers like Thomas Cromwell to shape the Reformation.
1532, January	Supplication against the Ordinaries.	A formal petition to the King, debated and passed by the House of Commons, designed to give the appearance of widespread public unease and popular opposition to clerical privilege. It accused bishops of abusing judicial powers, particularly through harsh use of excommunication and church courts, and claimed the clergy placed foreign (papal) interests above those of England and demanded greater royal and parliamentary control over ecclesiastical authority. This was one of the key early acts of the English Reformation Parliament and precipitated the Submission of the Clergy accepted shortly after by the Convocation of Canterbury.
1532, May	Act in Conditional Restraint of Annates	Reduced the annual payment of annates to the papacy to just 5% of their original amount. Parliament threatened that it would withdraw all payments if Rome would not grant the King his annulment within one year. One of the key early acts of the Reformation Parliament, it was significantly strengthened by the later Act Concerning Ecclesiastical Appointments and Absolute Restraint of Annates which reserved all annates to the crown and the Peter's Pence Act 1533 which ended another key kind of payment from the English faithful to Rome.
1532, 15 May	Submission of the Clergy accepted by the Convocation of Canterbury.	A formal act in response to the Commons Supplication Against the Ordinaries, by which the senior clergy of the Province of Canterbury of the Church of England acknowledged that they would no longer enact or enforce canon law without the King’s licence. By this submission, they surrendered their independent legislative authority, right of appeal to Rome, autonomy over ecclesiastical courts, and control over benefices and church property disputes, subordinating the legal and institutional life of the Church to the Crown. It is widely recognised as the moment the crisis begun in 1526 widened from the question of Henry's annulment to wider church reform.
1532, 16 May	Thomas More resigns as Lord Chancellor of England and the informal position of Henry's chief minister.	A resignation on principle against a perceived overstep of royal authority, a breaking of the coronation vow to protect the church's liberty. Due to More's fame as a humanist scholar and correspondent of Erasmus, his resignation deeply humiliated the king but also cleared one of the key supporters of papal supremacy out of the Privy Council opening the way for the further rise of Thomas Cromwell.
1532, June	Act in Conditional Restraint of Appeals.	An act of parliament that limited appeals to the Pope in ecclesiastical court cases, requiring that such appeals only proceed with the king’s permission. One of the key early acts of the Reformation Parliament, it was significantly strengthened by the later Act in Restraint of Appeals.
1532, August 22	William Warham, last pre-reformation Archbishop of Canterbury, dies at Hackington in Kent.	Died, like Wolsey, still under charge of praemunire. His death opened the way for the appointment of Thomas Cranmer as Archbishop the following year.
1532, December	Anne Boleyn falls pregnant.	Increased the urgency for Henry to marry Anne, both because it proved her fertility and to avoid the scandal of an illegitimate baby. Consequently, this increased the urgency to secure an immediate annulment, precipitating first the actions of the newly appointed Archbishop Cranmer, in contravention of papal rulings, and, in November 1534, the formal severance from Rome. It also proved that the couple's claim to chastity awaiting marriage was, by this stage at least, false.
1533, 25 January	Henry VIII marries Anne Boleyn at Whitehall Palace. The nuptial mass celebrated by Thomas Cranmer, Archdeacon of Taunton and soon to be Archbishop of Canterbury.	Henry’s marriage to Anne Boleyn without papal dispensation directly contravened canon law and papal authority bringing at least the married couple and Archbishop Cranmer into formal schism. It prompted Parliament to pass the Statute in Restraint of Appeals enabling Cranmer to formally declare Henry's marriage to Catherine illegitimate without fear of appeal to papal jurisdiction, which he did at Dunstable Priory later in the spring. When news reached Clement VII in July, he excommunicated Henry and Cranmer.

== Henrician Reformation ==
Date	Event	Significance to the Reformation in England
1533, 18 March	Thomas Cranmer, Archdeacon of Taunton, appointed Archbishop of Canterbury by Henry VII. His decision was formally confirmed by a rubber stamping vote of the monks of Canterbury Cathedral Priory a few days after.	An appointment motivated by the urgent need to secure annulment following Henry's clandestine marriage to Anne Boleyn on 25 January. Cranmer was a Cambridge-educated reformer—student at Jesus, later fellow at Magdalene—he was shaped by the White Horse Group, by his early experience of falling in love and marrying while on the path to priesthood and academia, and by his contact with continental reformers during his travels on diplomatic missions for the Crown. So long as Henry lived, largely maintained conservative theology in accordance with the King’s taste within the Church of England. In this capacity, he solemnised the annulment between Henry and Catherine of Aragon without regard to the earlier papal refusal to try to save the king from possible charges of polygamy following his marriage to Anne. After Henry’s death in 1547 and the accession of his nine-year-old son, Edward VI, he would become the principal force behind, and architect of, the Edwardian Reformation, rapidly implementing a moderate but firmly reformed theology as the orthodoxy of the Church of England by means of the Book of Common Prayer, Book of Homilies and Forty-two Articles.
1533, 30 March	Cranmer consecrated bishop in London at either Lambeth Palace Chapel or St Mary Aldermanbury. His enthronement in Canterbury Cathedral followed on April 4.	This was the moment Cranmer took his oath to the papacy as part of the liturgy of episcopal consecration, although neither Clement VII nor any of his successors granted the usual approval of appointments to the Archbishopric of Canterbury. His oath was frequently used against him both as a criticism including during his trial for heresy.
1533, March-April	Statute in Restraint of Appeals. Accepted by Parliament in the first week of April, granted Royal Assent on April 15.	This bill formed part of a strategy to establish the legal foundation of Henry VIII’s marriage to Anne Boleyn, enabling the courts of the Church of England to issue an annulment of Henry's marriage to Catherine of Aragon in formal schism with Holy See and the rest of the Latin Church. It removed the right to appeal from all subjects of the crown who wished to dispute the ruling of an English church court in the appellate court of the Roman Curia. This meant no one could either initiate proceedings to challenge the annulment or express public support for any ruling Rome might happen to make on its legitimacy. It was superseded the following year by the Act of Supremacy, which acknowledged full Royal Supremacy over the Church of England.
1533, 12 April	Thomas Cromwell made Chancellor of the Exchequer.	Cromwell was gradually becoming Henry VIII's Chief Minister taking up the position of Secretary of State and Master of the Rolls the following year. He would be a principal architect of the legislation that secured monarchical supremacy over the Church of England and the Dissolution of the Monasteries.
1533, 23 May	Archbishop Thomas Cranmer, formally annulled Henry’s marriage to Catherine of Aragon during a session of an extraordinary archiepiscopal court sitting at Dunstable Priory in Bedfordshire.	The proceedings of this court were enabled by the Statute in Restraint of Appeals, passed by Parliament a month earlier. It is the ruling which brought about a formal schism between the Church of England and the Holy See. The choice of setting was deliberately near Ampthill Castle, where Catherine of Aragon was living. She refused to recognise its judgement and maintained the legitimacy of her marriage to Henry until her death a few years later, in 1536. The ruling of the ecclesiastical court would be backed up by a ruling of Parliament in March the following year, when the Act of Succession ruled that Princess Mary was a bastard.
1533, 4 July	John Frith executed by burning at Smithfield.	
1533, 9 July	Pope Clement VII excommunicated Henry VIII and his advisers (including Thomas Cranmer) for the marriage to Anne Boleyn.	The write of excommunication included a caveat that it would be automatically void if the King separated from Anne before September. It was Henry VIII's first formal excommunication by the papacy.
1533, 7 September	Princess Elizabeth born at Greenwich Palace.	The future Queen (1558–1603) who would restore the Henrician and Edwardian Reformations and establish the Elizabethan Settlement, the foundation of the modern Church of England.
1534, March	Act Concerning Ecclesiastical Appointments and Absolute Restraint of Annates.	The bill achieved two ends: firstly, established the monarch's unilateral authority to appoint all bishops and abbots, reducing papal influence on English ecclesiastical offices; secondly, it ended the payment of annates to the Pope, redirecting them to the English Crown. In its first capacity, it legitimised the appointment of Archbishop Cranmer without papal approval and all subsequent royal appointments to English bishoprics. In its second capacity, it strengthened the Act in Conditional Restraint of Annates passed by parliament in 1532.
1534, March	Act Concerning Peter's Pence and Dispensations.	Abolished the Kingdom of England's payment of Peter’s Pence and prohibited subjects of the crown from accepting papal dispensations and privileges unless approved by the King.
1534, March	First Act of Succession.	The act achieved three key ends. Firstly, it enforced universal recognition of the royal marriage by a universal public Oath of Succession for all clergy, secular officials, and university academics, as well as any subject called upon to take the oath, with dissenters suffering punishment for High Treason. This was a momentous step, the first time the ordinary common men of England were required to take an oath as a whole body. Secondly, the act altered the line of succession following the logic of annulment. An annulment is the formal recognition that a given marriage is illicit, that it never existed, and that therefore all children produced by it are illegitimate. In the case of Henry and Catherine of Aragon it followed that Princess Mary was a bastard, excluded from the royal succession. Her title of Princess was discarded in favour of Lady Mary. Thirdly, it removed all previous legislation implying the dependence of the English succession on the Pope for its legitimacy and forbade the opinion to subjects.
1534, 20 April	Execution of Elizabeth Barton (The Holy Maid of Kent) together with her confessor Edward Bocking OSB and 6 of her supporters in the churchyard of St Sepulchre-without-Newgate in the City of London.	One of the key popular voices against Henry’s annulment and marriage to Anne. Her death marked a stark warning against dissent to the King’s policies.
1534, November	First Act of Supremacy.	This act above all others formalised the Church of England's schism from the Holy See and the rest of the Latin Church by clearly acknowledging the principle of Royal Supremacy and the full rejection of Papal Supremacy. Firstly, the act recognised that the English monarch was "of the Church of England in Earth, under Jesus Christ, Supreme Head", allegedly an ancient principle and title revived rather than an entirely new constitutional role. Secondly, it rejected all papal authority over either the Church of England's ecclesiastical courts, strengthening the earlier acts, or its ruling on its religious doctrine, a fundamentally new step. Thirdly, the act required all clergy and secular officials - this time extended to all local borough officers and all school teachers - as well as any subject called upon to take the oath, to swear a new Oath of Supremacy formally affirming their assent to the principle of Royal Supremacy in the Church of England.
1534, November	Treason Act.	Essentially the legislative framework for persecuting those who objected to the Act of Supremacy and the principle of the Royal Supremacy as traitors by expanding the definition of treason to include denial of the King’s supremacy over the Church. It made refusal of the Oath of Supremacy or speaking against the King’s religious authority a capital offence. Thus all Roman Catholic's going forward would be punished by either beheading for nobility or hanging, drawing, and quartering as traitors while all radical Protestants would by punished by burning under the old unrevised Heresy Acts passed against the Lollards.
1534, November	Act of First Fruits and Tenths.	Required that the remaining clerical levies paid by the English parish clergy to the Holy See should henceforth go to the monarch. The last revenue stream from England to the Roman Catholic Church.
1535	Bishop Gardiner's De Vera Obedientia published	
1535	The Coverdale Bible, compiled by Myles Coverdale published in Antwerp.	The first complete Modern English translation of the Bible (not just the Old Testament or New Testament), and the first complete printed translation into English. Coverdale's translation of the Psalms was adopted by Cranmer for the 1549 Book of Common Prayer and remained for centuries the translation of the psalter prescribed for liturgical use in the Anglican church.
1535	Cranmer appoints Hugh Latimer, Edward Foxe, Nicholas Shaxton to episcopacy.	
1535, May	Humphrey Middlemore, William Exmew, and Sebastian Newdigate, all Carthusian monks of the London Charterhouse, locked up for seventeen days. Ten more starve.	
1535, 22 June	John Fisher executed.	
1535, 6 July	Thomas More executed.	
1535, 31 August	Pope Paul III excommunicates Henry VIII and places the English Church under interdict.	This marked Papal acceptance and formalisation of the Church of Englands succession from communion with the Roman Catholic Church until the death of Anne Boleyn when it looked like England may return to Catholicism. Henry VIII's second excommunication.
1536	John Calvin publishes his Institutio Christianae Religionis.	The most complete work of early Protestant systematic theology, the ideas contained in the Institutes, known as reformed theology or Calvinism, were those generally favoured in the Church of England from Henry's death until the reign of Charles I, even until the 19th century. Most of the central teachings of both the Forty-two and the Thirty-nine Articles of Religion and the Eucharistic theology implied by the Book of Common Prayer show clear inspiration from Calvin directly, especially on the question of predestination.
1536 (date unknown)	William Tyndale executed for heresy near Vilvoorde on the continent.	
1536, January	Anne miscarries again.	
1536, 16 April	Royal Assent given to the First Suppression of Religious Houses Act.	This act initiated the first round of the Dissolution of the Monasteries condemning all houses with an income of £200 or less. The act was proposed on the pretext of the corruption of these institutions and suggested that the evicted religious would be joined to the larger houses. In practice these houses were also soon suppressed by a further 1539 Act and the religious life entirely suppressed in the Church of England until the revival of Anglican religious orders in the 19th century. Another pretext of the act was provision for charity. In practice almost all of the proceeds were used for military expenditure.
1536, April	'Reformation parliament' dissolved.	
1536, 19 May	Anne Boleyn is executed on Tower Green within the precincts the Tower of London and buried in the Chapel of St Peter ad Vincula.	
1536, 21 May	Genevan Reformation.	The reforms of John Calvin are institutionalised. Will do much to impact the Scottish Reformation and the Westminster Assembly during the later English Civil War.
1536, 30 May	Stephen Gardiner marries Henry VIII and Jane Seymour.	Jane will give birth to Prince Edward, Henry's long-awaited son and heir.
1536, June	Second Act of Succession	Annulled Henry's marriage to the late Anne Boleyn retrospectively and excluded Princess Elizabeth from the royal succession by declaring her a bastard. Also reasserted Lady Mary's illegitimacy and exclusion. It gave Henry the right to personally grant the right of succession by means of his will. It also made all denials of its claims guilty of High Treason.
1536, July	Ten Articles adopted.	This was the first formulation of the doctrine of the Church of England after the separation from Rome. Affirmed Transubstantiation, prayers for the dead, the intercession of the saints, and justification by both faith and works.
1536, 18 July	Act Extinguishing the Authority of the Bishop of Rome passed.	Reaffirmed the end of Papal Supremacy first expressed by the Act of Supremacy.
1536, 1 October	Pilgrimage of Grace begins.	Part of the popular reaction to the Dissolution of the Monasteries.
1536, 4 October	Pilgrimage of Grace led by 18 members of the gentry.	Part of the popular reaction to the Dissolution of the Monasteries.
1536, 13 October	York taken by 10,000 'pilgrims'.	Part of the popular reaction to the Dissolution of the Monasteries.
1536, 8 December	Duke of Norfolk offers pardon to rebels.	
1537	Bishops' Book published.	
1537	John Rogers produces the Matthew Bible.	
1537, January	Bigod's Rebellion, a further phase of the Pilgrimage of Grace, led by Sir Francis Bigod.	Part of the popular reaction to the Dissolution of the Monasteries. 216 Catholic rebels and leaders executed.
1537, 12 October	Prince Edward born to Jane Seymour at Hampton Court Palace.	Henry VIII's long desired male heir. The boy will come to be known as 'England's Josiah' (from the Old Testament reformer Josiah) as a result of the more radically Protestant reforms his ministers undertook in his short reign (1547–1553).
1538	Exeter Conspiracy.	Supposed pro papal plot against Henry VIII.
1538, autumn	The much revered holy images of the Rood of Grace, Our Lady of Cardigan, Our Lady of Doncaster, Our Lady of Ipswich, Our Lady of Walsingham, and Our Lady of Willesden were burned by Cromwell at his home in Chelsea.	This was some of the earliest notable iconoclasm in the Church of England. Most art would remain in place in parish churches during Henry's reign and only the most famous of images, those which attracted pilgrimage, were regarded as blasphemous.
1538, 22 November	John Lambert burnt to death for heresy.	
1538, 17 December	Pope Paul III excommunicates Henry VIII a second time after the sentence had been lifted following Anne Boleyn's execution. The English Church again placed under interdict.	This marked the final Papal acceptance of the Church of England's succession from communion with the Roman Catholic Church until Mary I Catholic restoration. Henry VIII's third and final papal excommunication.
1539, 28 June	Six Articles (1539).	Affirmed traditional doctrine.
1539, 28 June	Royal Assent given to the Second Suppression of Religious Houses Act.	Leads to the second wave of the Dissolution of the Monasteries.
1539	Taverner's Bible published.	
1539	Publication of the Great Bible compiled by Miles Coverdale.	This is the first English translation of the Bible to be authorised for use in parish churches.
1540, 6 January	Henry marries Anne of Cleves.	
1540, 9 July	Henry's marriage to Anne of Cleves is annulled.	
1540, 28 July	Thomas Cromwell is beheaded.	
1540, 30 July	Simultaneous execution of evangelicals Robert Barnes, William Jerome and Thomas Gerrard by burning at the stake for heresy against the Six Articles with Thomas Abel, Richard Fetherstone and Edward Powell by hanging, drawing, and quartering for treason against Royal Supremacy at Smithfield.	An execution of three recusant Roman Catholics for treason and the man who had preached the first openly evangelical sermon in Cambridge in 1525 (Robert Barnes) and two evangelical companions for heresy. A summary of Henry's unique via media and the oppressive consequences of his idiosyncratic reformation for both religious progressives and conservatives.
1543	The King's Book is published.	A high point of the resurgence of conservative religious policies rolling back of many of the reformist elements of the Bishops' Book of 1537. Notably the seven sacraments are reasserted.
1543	Prebendaries Plot. Cranmer is arrested on grounds of heresy.	An attack on the chief reforming figure in the English episcopate.
1544	Bishop Gardiner is targeted.	
1545	First Dissolution of Colleges Act.	First wave of the dissolution of chantries.
1546, 16 July	Anne Askew burned for heresy.	
1546	'Creeping to the Cross' added to the list of forbidden practises.	
1547, 28 January	Henry VIII dies.	Henry's death and Edward's accession opened the way for a far more radical reformation. He was buried with full catholic ceremonial and had commissioned many Requiem masses to be sung.

== Edwardian Reformation ==
Date	Event	Significance to the Reformation in England
1547, 28 January	Edward VI accedes to the throne aged 9	Edwards Council of Regency, headed by Edward, Duke of Somerset as Lord Protector, allows Archbishop Thomas Cranmer to undertake a far more radical reformation than had been possible under Henry VIII. Thanks to these reforms the boy will come to be known as 'England's Josiah' (from the Old Testament reformer Josiah).
1547, August	A visitation of parish churches is undertaken and the Royal Injunctions are implemented.	Rosaries are outlawed along with religious processions
1547, December 24	Second Dissolution of Colleges Act	Second wave of the dissolution of chantries
1547	The First Book of Homilies introduced.	Cranmer's attempt to standardise Protestant doctrine across the English church through prescribed parish sermons.
1547	The Italian reformers and refugees Peter Martyr Vermigli and Bernardino Ochino arrive in England at Cranmer's request to take up academic positions.	Part of a wave of notable continental reformers who sought refuge in Edwardian England and came to influence its universities. Peter Martyr particularly would influence the form of the Book of Common Prayer.
1549, 21 January	The First Book of Common Prayer is introduced by Thomas Cranmer in Convocation and the Act of Uniformity imposed its use in all churches.	This made the Book of Common Prayer the only lawful form of public worship after Whitsunday later in the same year. It was the first of several such acts that would be passed by parliament in the course of the reformation.
1549, 7 April	John Knox licensed to minister in the Church of England and made parish priest of Berwick upon Tweed.	Knox will later go on to take a number of posts and preach frequently in the Chapel Royal. His challenge of Cranmer's compromises with conservatives lead to the composition of the Black Rubric in 1552. In the 1560s he will come to be the principal leader of the Scottish Reformation.
1549, 25 April	Martin Bucer, the German Lutheran reformer arrives in London as a refugee accompanied by the scholar Paul Fagius. Welcomed with honour by Cranmer and Edward VI	Part of a wave of notable continental reformers who sought refuge in Edwardian England and came to influence its universities.
1549, 9 June	Whitsunday 1549 was the first time the new English service from the Book of Common Prayer was read out in parish churches.	A series of popular revolts followed.
1549, June–August	The Prayer Book Rebellion in the West Country against the imposition of the new liturgy, especially amongst Cornish speakers who knew no English.	Part of the popular reaction to the Act of Uniformity and the Putting away of Books & Images Act. Around 5'000 Catholic rebels killed.
1549, June	Buckinghamshire and Oxfordshire rising in reaction to the introduction of the Book of Common Prayer and to land enclosures.	Part of the popular reaction to the Act of Uniformity.
1549, July–August	Kett's Rebellion, the Norfolk wave of reactions to land enclosure and liturgical reform.	Part of the popular reaction to the Act of Uniformity.
1550, 1 February	Putting away of Books and Images Act orders the removal of religious books and the destruction of images in churches	Leads to one of the worst waves of iconoclasm in English history. All parish churches see their statues and roods desecrated and their wall paintings overpainted.
1550	John Ponet consecrated Bishop of Rochester by Thomas Cranmer. Later transferred to Winchester.	One of a number of noted Protestant minded clerics made bishops of the Church of England under Edward VI.
1550, 2 May	Joan Bocher burned at the stake for preaching the Anabaptist heresy.	One of just two radical Protestants executed under Edward.
1550, 24 July	French Protestant Church of London and Dutch Church, Austin Friars established, the later in the church of the dissolved London Austin Priory.	Two of a wave of Stranger churches established for foreign Protestant refugees.
1551	George van Parris burnt for heresy, a member of the Dutch Stranger Church.	
1551, 8 March	John Hooper consecrated Bishop of Gloucester by Thomas Cranmer.	Refused consecration initially because of vestments controversy. One of the most radical of the Protestants made bishops in the Church of England during the Edwardian Reformation.
1551, 30 August	Myles Coverdale consecrated Bishop of Exeter by Thomas Cranmer.	
1552	The Second Book of Common Prayer is enforced by the Act of Uniformity 1552.	Heavily revised to emphasise reformed eucharistic theology.
1553, 19 June	Cranmer's Forty-two Articles are made normative for all the English clergy by the Privy Council.	This formulation of doctrine, its first thoroughly reformed formulation, survived as the teaching of the Church of England only a few months.
1553, 6 July	Edward VI dies aged 15, leaving the throne to his Protestant cousin, Lady Jane Grey and excluding both his half-sisters in an attempt to secure the continued reformation of the Church of England.	Edward's death marks the point of most radical reform the Church of England ever experienced until the time of The Interregnum. It resulted in the restoration of full communion with the papacy to the Church under Mary I and the comparatively conservative Elizabethan Settlement when Protestantism was restored under Elizabeth.

== Marian Restoration ==
Date	Event	Significance to the Reformation in England
1553, 10-19 July	The 9 day reign of Queen Jane Grey. She was publicly acclaimed as Queen of England in London on 10 July by Edward VI's ministers lead by John Dudley.	This short reign was an abortive attempt on the part of Edward's Protestant council to avert the accession of Mary and Elizabeth Tudor and a feared restoration of Roman Catholicism. It was also likely a means of preserving the political power of those ministers.
1553, 12 July	Princess Mary arrived at Framlingham Castle where she stayed as troops gathered to support her from across Suffolk and key nobles declared their support for her over Jane.	
1553, 14 July	The Privy Council withdrew their support from Jane offering it to Mary.	Doomed Jane's claim in the succession crisis.
1553, 19 July	Queen Jane Grey was deposed and arrested by the Privy council and Mary was acclaimed Queen. Mary was sent for at Framlingham and arrived in London in late July.	Established Mary as monarch and ensured the temporary Roman Catholic restoration in England, Wales, and Ireland.
1553, late July	Nicholas Ridley, Bishop of London, is arrested (July 1553) and formally deprived of his see following his refusal to conform to restored Latin liturgical rites restored by the Privy Council in anticipation of the wider Restoration of Roman Catholicism.	
1553, 23 August	Stephen Gardiner, Bishop of Winchester, made Lord Chancellor.	First of Mary's two Lord Chancellors, both Bishops, responsible for advising her and implementing her religious and secular policies.
1553, 1 September	Miles Coverdale, Bishop of Exeter, is deprived of his see because he was married.	
1553, 14 September	Thomas Cranmer arrested at Lambeth Palace and taken into custody at the Tower of London	Cranmer was the principal object of Mary's displeasure due to his central role in securing the annulment of the marriage between her father and mother, Henry VIII and Catherine of Aragon back in 1533 and his role as Archbishop of Canterbury in overseeing the Edwardian Reformation and the compilation of the Book of Common Prayer.
1553, 1 October	Coronation of Queen Mary I in Westminster Abbey. The service was celebrated by Stephen Gardener due to the Archbishop of Canterbury's imprisonment.	
1553, 5 October	John Taylor, Bishop of Lincoln, is formally deprived of his bishopric for refusing to hear Mass and rejecting papal supremacy; removed from Convocation and Parliament on 5 October.	
1553, December	First Statute of Repeal nullifies all religious legislation passed under Edward VI	Returned religious policy to the one in place during her father's reign and undid all Cranmer's reforms during Edward's short reign. The Book of Common Prayer was banned, the Sarum Rite was restored, and parish churches were encouraged to resume processions and restore desecrated iconography.
1554, 26 January	Start of Wyatt's rebellion in protest at Mary's planned marriage to Prince Philip of Spain.	
1554, 12 February	Execution of Lady Jane Grey.	Largely a response to Wyatt's rebellion and fear of an alternative possible monarch for rebels to rally round. Mary saw Jane as an innocent victim of the machinations of Edward's Protestant councilors.
1554, 19 March	John Hooper, Bishop of Gloucester and Worcester, is deprived of his two episcopal sees.	
1554, 14 April	Hugh Latimer, Bishop of Worcester, is examined by papal commissioners on 14 April 1554 and deprived of ecclesiastical office for rejecting transubstantiation and papal authority.	
1554, 25 July	Mary marries her cousin Philip II of Spain, King of Spain, in Winchester Cathedral. The nuptial mass was celebrated by Steven Gardener. Philip nominally became King of England in a coregency with Mary, although the marriage contract scrupulously stipulated that all political power rested with Mary and Philip never underwent a ceremony of coronation.	Firmly bound the Kingdom of England to Habsburg Spain and its ally the Holy Roman Empire against the Kingdom of France. Due to the many executions of Protestant for heresy under the coregency, it will do much to inflame later English and Protestant anti Spanish sentiments known as the Black legend.
1555, 13 November	Thomas Cranmer officially deprived of the See of Canterbury.	
1554, 20 November	Cardinal Reginald Pole returns to England	
1554, 30 November	Mary persuades Parliament to request Reginald Pole, the Papal Legate, to seek Papal absolution for England's separation from the Catholic Church.	Signals the beginning of the return of the Church of England to communion with the See of Rome
1555, 16 January	Second Statute of Repeal, also known as the See of Rome Act, removes all religious legislation passed since 1529	Formally ended the schism, reestablished Papal Supremacy over the Church of England, and returned the nations Dioceses and Parishes to full communion with the rest of the Latin Church.
1555, 16 January	Revival of the Heresy Acts restored the death penalty for those that denied the principles of Catholicism.	More than 300 people would be executed during Mary's reign, mostly by burning at the stake, earning her the title of Bloody Mary, even though Queen Elizabeth and King Henry executed many more people during their reigns
1555, 4 February	John Rogers burned at the stake at Smithfield.	First of the Marian Martyrs, editor of the Matthew Bible and Royal Chaplain to Edward IV.
1555, 9 February	John Hooper, former Bishop of Gloucester, burned at the stake in Gloucester.	
1555, 1 July	John Bradford burned at the stake at Smithfield.	
1555, 16 October	Hugh Latimer, former Bishop of Worcester, and Nicholas Ridley, former Bishop of London, were burned at the stake in Oxford. Cranmer was a witness to their deaths.	Among Latimer's dying words was the famous line: "Be of good comfort, Master Ridley, and play the man! We shall this day light such a candle, by God's grace, in England, as I trust shall never be put out."
1556, 21 March	Archbishop Thomas Cranmer burned at the stake in Oxford.	The story of Cranmer's death and those of all the Protestant martyrs become ideologically very potent in future years thanks to their faithful willingness to suffer and Foxes Book of Martyrs which popularised them.
1556, 22 March	Reginald Pole consecrated Archbishop of Canterbury.	He would prove to be the last Roman Catholic Primate of All England.
1556, 27 June	The 13 Stratford Martyrs were all burned at the stake for heresy at either Stratford, London or Stratford le Bow (now Bow, London).	Witnessed by upwards of 20,000 people. Stratford Martyrs Memorial erected during 19th century.
1558, 17 November	Mary I dies and her half-sister Princess Elizabeth accedes. Cardinal Pole, Archbishop of Canterbury dies the same day leaving the key clerical position conveniently open for a Protestant replacement. Philip's English title lapses with the death of his wife.	Initiates the Elizabethan reformation, the final end of Roman Catholicism as the state church in England. Widely celebrated as Elizabeth's accession and the liberation of England from the Pope for the next 300 years. The 17th of November comes to be known as Queene's Day.

== Elizabethan Reformation ==
Date	Event	Significance to the Reformation in England
1559, 15 January	Elizabeth is crowned. Due to her pro-Protestant agenda, only a low-ranking clergyman, Bishop Owen Oglethorpe of Carlisle, is willing to officiate the ceremony.	The last Catholic coronation of a British monarch.
1558-59	Elizabethan Religious Settlement, a compromise which secured a return to a Reformed Protestantism but allowed some Catholic traditions such as kneeling for Communion and the sign of the cross to continue.	The Elizabethan Settlement finally established the norms of Anglican doctrine around the principle of the via media which, apart from during The Interregnum, has remained the bedrock of the Church of England's identity ever since.
1559, 31 March	Opening session of the Westminster Conference held in Westminster Hall to determine Elizabeth's religious policy.	
1559, May 8	Act of Supremacy 1558 confirmed Elizabeth as Head of the Church of England and abolished the authority of the Pope in England.	Final schism between the Church of England with the Roman Papacy. Oath of Supremacy reimposed.
1559, May 8	Act of Uniformity 1558	Required attendances at church services and introduced the newly revised Book of Common Prayer (1559).
1559, June-July	Thirteen Marian bishops—Nicholas Heath (Archbishop of York), Edmund Bonner (Bishop of London), Cuthbert Tunstall (Bishop of Durham), Thomas Thirlby (Bishop of Ely), John White (Bishop of Winchester), Thomas Watson (Bishop of Lincoln), Ralph Baynes (Bishop of Lichfield and Coventry), John Christopherson (Bishop of Chichester), Gilbert Bourne (Bishop of Bath and Wells), James Turberville (Bishop of Exeter), Thomas Reynolds (Bishop of Hereford), and David Pole (Bishop of Peterborough)—are deprived of office for refusing the Oath of Supremacy or to conform to the Book of Common Prayer (1559).	These deprivations enabled a clean sweep of the hierarchy of the Church of England and most were replaced with Protestant refugees returning from exile.
1559, 1 August	Matthew Parker appointed Archbishop of Canterbury	The Second Protestant Primate of All England. The uncertain circumstances of his private consecration gave rise to the Nag's Head Fable popular among recusants. He was the second of Englands Protestant Primates
1559-1560	Scottish Reformation	Lead by John Knox and the Lords of the Congregation. Will do much to impact the Long Reformation in England once the crowns are united following Elizabeth's death. The Presbyterian polity Knox established in the Church of Scotland would be a significant source of inspiration for the Puritans of the Church of England.
1560	Geneva Bible published in Switzerland	Published by Sir Rowland Hill. Although never authorised for use in England, it was the first English Bible to be divided into verses and became popular with Dissenters.
1563	First publication of a revision of Cranmer's Book of Homilies.	An edited reprint of Cranmer's earlier Book of Homilies, this book provided prescribed sermons to ensure doctrinal unity across the Church of England.
1568	Bishops' Bible published	A compromise between the vigorous but Calvinist Geneva Bible and the Great Bible, which it replaces in parish churches.
1569, 9 November—1570, 21 January	The Rising of the Northern Earls against Elizabeth in an attempt to install Mary, Queen of Scots as monarch of England.	Intensifies anti Catholic reprisals and strengthens Elizabeth's position.
1570, 27 April	Pope Pius V excommunicates Elizabeth I in the bull Regnans in Excelsis declaring her a heretic and threatening those who obeyed her laws with excommunication.	
1571, August	Ridolfi plot to overthrow Elizabeth I and restore state Catholicism.	A plot by the Duke of Norfolk, Roberto di Ridolfo, and several European Catholic dignitaries including the Pope and the King of Spain to replace Elizabeth with Mary, Queen of Scots.
1571	The Thirty-nine Articles of Religion finalised and accepted as the Church of England's principle doctrinal statement.	The mature theological expression of the Elizabethan Settlement. These articles, a revised edition of Cranmer's Forty-two Articles of Religion, were appended to the Book of Common Prayer. Apart from a period during The Interregnum, this has remained the Church of England's core statement of faith (aside from the three Ecumenical Creeds) ever since and still plays a fundamental role in Anglican doctrine today.
1571	First publication of a new Book of Homilies.	Like Cranmer's earlier Book of Homilies, this book provided prescribed sermons to ensure doctrinal unity across the Church of England. It was largely written by Matthew Parker and designed to be supplement the previous editions.
1572, 2 June	Execution of Thomas Howard, 4th Duke of Norfolk for his role in the Ridolfi plot.	
1572, 22 August	Execution of Thomas Percy, 7th Earl of Northumberland in York for his role in the Rising of the Northern Earls.	One of the Catholic martyrs of the English Reformation, he was subsequently beatified by Pope Leo XIII on 13 May 1895.
1572, 24 August	St Bartholomew's Day Massacre begins in Paris.	Sends shockwaves throughout Protestant Europe and sparks a wave of Huguenots seeking refuge in England from French Catholic persecution.
1574	Peter Baro, a French Huguenot refugee was appointed Lady Margaret's Professor of Divinity at the University of Cambridge.	A proto-Arminian, this marked a new departure in English Protestant theology.
1575, 17 May	Matthew Parker dies.	
1575, 29 December	Edmund Grindal enthroned as Archbishop of Canterbury.	The third Protestant Primate of All England. A radical Protestant (see puritans) he caused significant controversy during his brief tenure.
1578, January	Elizabeth I tries to have Edmund Grindal deprived of office.	Grindal was pushing for more puritanical reforms in the Church of England in relations to vestments, kneeling, and the use of the sigh of the cross. He resigns in 1583.
1581	Robert Browne attempted to set up a separatist Puritan congregation in Norwich to avoid the governmental norms of a Church of England parish. He failed and went into exile.	In exile Browne published many works espousing his progressive ecclesiology. These works inspired a radical puritan movement known as the Brownists. A majority of those onboard the Mayflower were Brownists. They are considered an antecedent to the later post Civil War Independents who became the modern Congregationalists. Browne's teachings are still explicitly looked to by the Congregational Federation and would come to be implicitly adopted by modern Non-denominational Christians.
1581, 1 December	Edmund Campion was executed by hanging, drawing, and quartering at Tyburn.	The leader of the early Jesuit mission to English recusants and hidden Catholics, his execution is among the most notable of the many hundreds who died for their Catholic faith.
1583, 14 August	John Whitgift appointed Archbishop of Canterbury.	The fourth Protestant Primate of All England.
1583	Elizabeth I commissions John Whitgift to reorganise the Court of High Commission. Part of this involved the appointment of the first Ecclesiastical Commission of the Church of England.	Repressed Puritan extremism of the kind typified by Genevan and Scottish Presbyterian minded reformers such as Edmund Grindal and Thomas Cartwright and Separatists such Robert Browne. Initiated many more proceedings against Puritan Church of England priests who conscientiously objected to certain surviving Catholic elements in Anglican liturgy (the use of the sign of the cross, the rigid liturgical form of the Book of Common Prayer, and the deliberately ambiguous words Elizabeth's 1559 version (which has survived in today's 1662 version) used to try and reconcile both widespread belief in the real presence and the firmly spiritualist or memorialist Puritans). Principal moment of Elizabethan ecclesiastical authoritarianism in Puritan eyes.
1583, November	The Throckmorton Plot is uncovered.	One of a series of Catholic plots to overthrow Elizabeth I and replace her with Mary, Queen of Scots.
1586, 25 March	Margaret Clitherow, Catholic housewife, shopkeeper, and schoolmistress, executed by being crushed to death on the banks of the River Ouse in York.	One of the many recusant martyrs of the Elizabethan age.
1586, July	The Babington Plot is uncovered by government spies.	Mary, Queen of Scots is implicated along with a few other Catholic nobles. This plot encourages the already fierce persecution of recusants.
1587, 8 February	Mary, Queen of Scots is executed	
1588, 8 August	The Spanish Armada is defeated by the English fleet, aided by high winds	
1593, 6 April	Henry Barrowe, Separatist preacher, leading reformer, theologian, and friend of Robert Browne hanged with two companions, John Greenwood, and John Penry at Tyburn.	Part of the reprisals against Puritan separatists that characterised the later religious policy of Elizabeth I.
1595, 29 April	William Barret preaches a landmark sermon criticising Calvinist predestination at Great St Mary's in Cambridge.	A key moment in the development of Anglican Arminianism, which will become the dominant theological position of the Church of England in the years of Charles I.
1595	Lambeth Articles drafted and accepted by bishops. Queen Elizabeth refused to approve them meaning they were never accepted by as teaching in the Church of England.	Expressed an extreme form of Calvinist predestination.
1597	Irish Rebellion led by Hugh O'Neill, Earl of Tyrone	
1601, February 27	Anne Line executed by hanging and Roger Filcock S.J, and Mark Barkworth O.S.B executed by hanging, drawing, and quartering.	Among the Catholic martyrs of the English Reformation.
1603, March 24	Elizabeth I died. Succeeded by James VI and I.	

== Long Reformation ==
=== Reign of James I ===
Date	Event	Significance to the Reformation in England
1603, spring	Millenary Petition presented to James VI and I	Request for a further reform of the Church of England along Puritan Calvinist lines as had been done to the Church of Scotland, although not requesting the controversial but popular hope for a deposition of the bishops of the Church of England in favour of full Presbyterian polity. Signed by 800-1000 priests of the Church of England and lead to the Hampton Court Conference, which almost entirely rejected its demands and lead to the ejection of nearly 300 Puritan clergy from their vicarages and rectories.
1603, 11 July	James VI of Scotland and I of England crowned King of England at Westminster Abbey	
1604, January	Hampton Court Conference	The first major discussion of church policy in the reign of James I. Book of Common Prayer (1604) published and a new Bible translation commissioned, what would become the King James Version
1604, 29 Feb	John Whitgift, Archbishop of Canterbury, dies in office.	
1604, 9 October	Richard Bancroft nominated Archbishop of Canterbury	Fifth Protestant Primate of All England.
1605	Lancelot Andrewes made Bishop of Chichester.	Subsequently, made Bishop of Ely in 1609 and Bishop of Winchester in 1619. A key proponent of Arminianism in the Church of England hierarchy balancing out the hegemony of the Calvinists.
1605, 5 November	Gunpowder Plot foiled	Leads to an increase in anti recusant persecution. It also results in the popular English celebration of Guy Fawkes Night, a major instrument of Anti-Catholic propaganda in the country even till the present day.
1606, 30–31 January	Guy Fawkes and other Gunpowder Plotters, Everard Digby, Robert Winter, John Grant, Thomas Bates, Thomas Winter, Ambrose Rookwood and Robert Keyes are executed	
1606, 3 May	Henry Garnet, leader of the Jesuit mission to English recusants and hidden Catholics, was executed as a traitor by hanging, drawing, and quartering at St Paul's Cross in the City of London.	Executed for refusing to reveal details of the Gunpowder Plot learned under the seal of the confessional.
1606-1607	Scrooby Congregation of Separatists emigrates to the Netherlands seeking religious freedom.	This congregation would later return to England as a result of events in the Eighty Years' War before departing again to the New World on the Mayflower in 1620. They would become known as America's Pilgrim Fathers.
1609	Plantation of Ulster	
1610, 2 November	Richard Bancroft dies in office.	
1611, 4 March	George Abbot nominated Archbishop of Canterbury.	Sixth Protestant Primate of All England.
1611	King James Bible completed and published.	The text rapidly became the standard English Biblical translation used in Britain and its growing colonial empire, used by both Anglicans and nonconformists alike. It remained in use across the Anglosphere as the principle biblical translation well into the 20th century and its singular authority is still maintained by a King James Only movement widespread among some conservative Protestant denominations in America, Australia, and the United Kingdom.
1612	Thomas Helwys established the first Baptist church in England at Spitalfields in London.	The first congregation of the modern Anglo-American Baptist movement and the forerunner to the modern Baptist Union of Great Britain. Helwys was inspired by Dutch Mennonite churches and the wider continental Anabaptist movement.
1612, 18 March	Bartholomew Legate burned to death at Smithfield	Last person to be burnt to death in London. He has been characterised as an Anabaptist, a Unitarian, and the father of the Seeker movement.
c. 1614-1623	The Spanish match controversy.	A long running series of negotiations planning a marriage between Charles, Prince of Wales and the Spanish Infanta Maria Anna, the daughter of King Philip III. The putative marriage was part of a planned peace treaty between Catholic Spain and Protestant England. It provoked significant opposition among England's House of Commons thanks to memory of the Catholic restoration and Protestant martyrdoms under the co-regency of Philip II and Mary I and the more recent Anglo-Spanish War of 1585-1604 including the infamous Spanish Armada of 1588.
1616	Thomas Helwys dies from maltreatment in prison.	A major figure in the foundation of the English Baptists and the General Baptist (i.e. anti Calvinist baptists).
1618, 13 November	Synod of Dort opening session.	A highly significant council in the history of reformed theology whose delegates would write the Canons of Dort, still considered normative by all Calvinist churches. Notably the Church of England was uncontroversially included and James I had been invited to send delegates with full voting rights. These were George Carleton, Bishop of Llandaff, Joseph Hall, Bishop of Norwich, and John Davenant, Bishop of Salisbury as well as the scholar Samuel Ward to represent the Church of England.
1620, 16 September	The Mayflower set sail from Plymouth.	The ship contained a group of Puritan dissenters, predominantly Brownists and members of the Scrooby Congregation, who became known as the Pilgrim Fathers. These were a key early wave of English settlers in the history of North America and would be the forerunners of many more dissenting colonists.
1624, July	Birth of George Fox at Fenny Drayton, Leicestershire	Fox would become the founder and principal early leader of the Religious Society of Friends (Quakers).
1625, 27 March	King James VI and I of England and Scotland dies.	

=== Reign of Charles I ===
Date	Event	Significance to the Reformation in England
1625, 27 March	Charles I crowned King of England, Scotland and Ireland.	Charles, a committed High Churchman tolerant of his wife's open Roman Catholicism, in many peoples eyes did much to reverse the reformation and these policies together with his autocratic personal rule spark the English Civil War and the wider Wars of the Three Kingdoms.
1632	Publication of Histriomastix by William Prynne.	A significant piece of puritan polemic against theatre, dancing, and the celebration of Christmas.
1633, 4 Aug	George Abbot, Archbishop of Canterbury, dies in office.	A "sincere but narrow minded Calvinist" his death lead the way for the ascendancy of the ritualism, Laudianism, and Arminianism of the High Church party.
1633, 6 Aug	William Laud appointed Archbishop of Canterbury	Seventh Protestant Primate of All England. A committed High Churchman and Arminian he attracts an enormous amount of controversy for his reforms which help spark the Civil War. He ends up dying a martyr of High Church Protestantism.
1634	Great Tew Circle begin meeting.	A leading group of anti Puritan churchmen and men of letters who did much to further the theology of Anglican Arminianism and the culture of Laudianism.
1637	William Prynne, John Bastwick and Henry Burton, noted Puritans and anti Laudian writers, were convicted of seditious libel by the Star Chamber and sentenced to be pilloried, cropped, and branded.	Heightened William Laud's unpopularity.
1637, 23 July	Jenny Geddes leads a riot when Charles II's new Scottish Prayer Book was first used in a public liturgy at St Giles' Cathedral in Edinburgh.	The Edinburgh riot and the other riots across Scotland is often considered the first trigger of the Wars of the Three Kingdoms.
1639-1640	Bishops' Wars in Scotland where Charles I would try to defend the Scottish episcopate.	First of the Wars of the Three Kingdoms
1641, May	Root and Branch petition set before parliament	A popular call for the abolition of the bishops of the Church of England and the establishment of a presbyterate.

=== Civil War and Interregnum ===
Date	Event	Significance to the Reformation in England
1642	English Civil War breaks out	Arose as a reaction against Charles I's autocracy, the unpopular High Church reforms of William Laud, and the growing discontent with episcopal polity in the Church of England.
1643	Westminster Assembly of Divines worked to restructure the Church of England.	This might be called the attempted Puritan or Presbyterian Reformation.
1644	Directory for Public Worship published by the Westminster Assembly	Intended as a replacement to the Book of Common Prayer and the Royalist assumptions and Catholic traditions its liturgy required parish congregations to assent to.
1644	Westminster Confession of Faith published by the Westminster Assembly	to replace the Thirty-nine Articles as the Church of England's doctrinal statement, the most progressively Protestant doctrinal statement in its history. It was never formally adopted by parliament in England and was firmly rejected by the reaffirmation of the Thirty-nine articles required by the Act of Uniformity 1662. It remains a fundamental text in Reformed Churches, both Presbyterian and Congregationalist, across the world today. In Britain it remains a central text in the Church of Scotland, the established church north of the border, the United Reformed Church, and the Congregational Federation.
1644, October	First London Baptist Confession published.	The first major confession of faith put forward by English Baptists defining a position against both the Presbyterian Westminster Assembly and continental Anabaptist radicals.
1645, 10 January	Execution of Archbishop William Laud.	Noted high churchman and figure of hatred for puritans.
1645	The Form of Presbyterial Church Government published by the Westminster Assembly	A comprehensive program for replacing episcopal polity with presbyterian polity in the Church of England. It was modelled on the structure of Dutch and the Swiss Reformed Churches. It was adopted the same year it was published by the Church of Scotland and remains the foundational text of Scottish church government. In England, like the Westminster Confession, parliament failed to pass it as law for the Church of England. Many of its structures were implemented during the interregnum across England but without legal support and with the 1650 repeal of the Act of Uniformity attendance was never a requirement and many local parishes, both royalist ones and those more radical than the Presbyterian Westminster Assembly, rejected it.
1646, October	Parliament passes an ordinance abolishing bishops and archbishops in the Church of England	Temporarily replaces the historically Episcopal polity of the Church of England with a Presbyterian polity. In practice, in more radical areas and areas where Royalist loyalties remained strong, this led to a completely anarchic congregational polity with some parishes choosing more radical liturgical forms and the majority persevering with the Book of Common Prayer.
1648	John Owen published The Death of Death in the Death of Christ.	A defence of the Calvinist Doctrine of Particular Redemption upheld by the Westminster Confession against Arminianism, Amyraldism, and Universalism. Together with Richard Baxter's Aphorisms of Redemption, which asserted the contrary Doctrine of Universal Atonement, the text would be the foundation of the conservative position in a major rift which still characterises most of the nonconformist churches of Britain to this day.
1648, 6 December	Pride's Purge of the Long Parliament of Presbyterian and Royalist sympathising MP's to the remaining Independents of the Rump Parliament.	This ends the possibility of the Puritan Presbyterian reformation so long hoped for by Calvinists within the Church Of England and planned by the Westminster Assembly. It also leads to a period of comparative leniency shown to Independent congregations and radical forms of Protestantism.
1649, 30 January	Execution of Charles I	The Regicide sent shockwaves through the nations consciousness, emboldened appetites for religious progress, and precipitated a royal martyrs cult among the Royalists.
1649, 9 February	Eikon Basilike published.	Initiation of the cult of King Charles the Martyr among royalists which then spread to the rest of the Church of England following The Restoration.
1649	Richard Baxter published his Aphorisms of Redemption.	A response to John Owen's Death of Death in the Death of Christ advocating the contrary Doctrine of Universal Atonement. Baxter's and Owen's works came to represent the foundational texts of two distinct camps of thought that still dominate both the nonconformist and Anglican churches to this day.
1650, May	Act of Uniformity 1558 repealed by the Rump Parliament by the Act for the Repeal of several Clauses in Statutes imposing Penalties for not coming to Church	The end of compulsory attendance in the established Church of England. Although a new Act of Uniformity was imposed in 1662 the habit of universal attendance in the parish church was effectively ended by this repeal with Quakers, Baptists, Congregationalists, and, after the Restoration, the Presbyterians too, often refusing to observe the 1662 legislation (see history of the Puritans from 1649).
1652, 13 June	George Fox preaches on Firbank Fell to a group of over a thousand spiritual seekers.	This sermon is considered one of the foundational events of the History of Quakerism. The Quakers (or the Religious Society of Friends as they later came to call themselves) represent the most radical surviving nonconformist church to emerge from the Civil War and the religious liberty of the Interregnum. Fox's message was founded on a teaching that God dwells in each person and so is immediately accessible to all without any need for either clergy, sacraments, or even necessarily scripture (Fox affirmed that interior mystical experience, while accessible without any biblical knowledge, would agree with the Bible if genuine).
1655, 15 January	John Biddle's Unitarian Twofold Catechism condemned by the First Protectorate Parliament and blasphemy prosecution is considered.	The question of the blasphemy of other sects was raised by this measure and many came to Biddle's defence, not in support of his anti Trinitarianism or his Arianism, but because his prosecution would have left all dissenters vulnerable to prosecution.
1656, 24 October	James Nayler entered the town of Bristol in the manner of the Christs triumphal entry.	The event caused outrage, Naylor was imprisoned, and the Quaker movement was severely shaken and disgraced. It initiated a cooling in Quaker radicalism which enabled it to survive the restoration.
1658, 3 September	Death of Oliver Cromwell.	Leads to an immediate constitutional crisis which continues for the following year and ends with the Stuart Restoration and the reestablishment of the episcopate of the Church of England as it had existed prior to the Civil War.
1658, 12 October	Opening session of the Savoy Assembly. It met for 11 or 12 days.	Drafted the Savoy Declaration, the foundational doctrinal statement of Congregationalism and their formal schism from the other Presbyterian Puritans. The Congregationalists would become one of England's leading nonconformist groups.

=== Restoration & reign of Charles II ===
Date	Event	Significance to the Reformation in England
1660, 29 May	Arrival of King Charles II in London and the Restoration of the Monarchy. Thereafter commemorated as Oak Apple Day	Reestablished the monarchy under the rule of the executed Charles I's eldest son. Restored the Church of England to episcopal polity.
1661, 15 April	Opening session of the Savoy Conference	Conference of High Church Anglican and Puritan divines convened to seek unity between the Presbyterian and Episcopal positions on polity.
1661, 20 November	Corporation Act 1661 came into law.	Required all officers of all cities and boroughs and all MP's of England and Wales to be regular communicant members of the Church of England. Part of the Clarendon Penal Code.
1662, 19 May	1662 Act of Uniformity came into law.	The 1662 Book of Common Prayer came into use and the Thirty-nine Articles of 1570 were restored as the Church of England's principal confession of faith. This version of the Prayer Book remained the Church of England's only authorised liturgy well into the 20th century. Oath of Supremacy reinstated though enforced with less severely out of concern for royalist recusant Catholic's and the growing number of Protestant nonconformists. Part of the Clarendon Penal Code.
1662	The Great Ejection	As a result of the Act of Uniformity a great many puritan clergy loyal to the Westminster Confession were ejected from their various livings
1664, 16 March	First Conventicle Act came into law.	Forbade all Conventicles of dissenters. This made attendance at all Baptist, Presbyterian, Congregationalist, and Quaker assemblies for worship illegal and punishable by several months imprisonment or a large fine for those who could afford it of £5 for first time offenders and £10 for second time offenders. For third time offenders and for the Quakers who refused to take the oath before testifying then transportation was imposed. Part of the Clarendon Penal Code and a response to both the dissenting congregations who broke from parish worship during the Interregnum and to new congregations that emerged following the clergy who had been deprived of their livings as part of the Great Ejection.
1665, 9 October	Five Mile Act 1665 came into law.	An intensification of the persecution of nonconformist clergy requiring them to vacate their homes. Part of the Clarendon Penal Code
1667	First publication of John Milton's Paradise Lost. A revised edition followed in 1674.	One of the many Puritan literary works of the Restoration period and one of the most revered works in the English language. An account of the fall of Satan and the Angels and Adam and Eve.
c. 1668-9	James, Duke of York, heir presumptive to Charles II and future James II, secretly converted to Roman Catholicism and received the Roman Catholic Eucharist at an unknown date between 1688 and 1689	James's conversion to Roman Catholicism, though hidden until he ceased to attend Church of England services in 1678, would cause the Exclusion Crisis, the Glorious Revolution, and the legislation preventing Roman Catholics from acceding to the crown of the United Kingdom, or marrying a reigning monarch or heir presumptive still in place today.
1670, 11 May	Second Conventicle Act came into law.	Moderated the anti dissenter legislation of 1664 and made all instances of attending or holding such assemblies amerceable by fines of between 5 and 40 shillings.
1672, 15 March	Charles II issued the First Declaration of Indulgence relieving Catholics from the Penal Laws they had hitherto endured.	The declaration sparked outrage among many Anglican royalists and the provisions it made were quickly reversed by the First Test Act the following year.
1673, 4 February	First Test Act came into law.	Required all persons in any public office, civil, military or religious, to take the oaths of supremacy and allegiance, to make a declaration disavowing transubstantiation, and to receive Holy Communion in consecrated in accordance with the rites of the Church of England within three months of admittance to office.
1677	Second London Baptist Confession first drafted and published.	A revision of the Savoy Declaration with an appendix on why the Baptist's believe paedobaptism to be a heresy and believers baptism as true orthodoxy.
1678	Part I of the Pilgrims Progress published by John Bunyan. It had been written during his imprisonment at Bedford in the 1660s.	This text became one of the core devotional works of English Protestants, both nonconformist and Anglican, and one of the best loved works in the English language. Describes the progress of a Christian soul through the process of redemption and fidelity to Christ.
1678, 1 December	Second Test Act came into effect.	Required that all peers and members of the House of Commons should make a declaration against transubstantiation, invocation of saints, and the sacrificial nature of the Mass. The effect of this was to exclude Roman Catholics from both houses, and in particular the "Five Popish Lords" from the House of Lords, a change motivated largely by the alleged Popish Plot.
1679-1681	The Exclusion Crisis.	An attempt to secure Protestant monarchy by removing James, Duke of York from the line of succession when his conversion became public knowledge.
1684	Publication of Part II of John Bunyan's Pilgrims Progress.	Second part focused on the journey of Christian women and children specifically.

=== Reign of James II ===
Date	Event	Significance to the Reformation in England
1685, 6 February	Death of Charles II and the accession of his brother the Duke of York who became James II	James II was a Roman Catholic. His accession sparked a crisis of public confidence leading the way to the 1688 Glorious Revolution.
1687, 4 April	James II issues a Second Declaration of Indulgence in England following its issuance in Scotland on the 4th of February.	Assured toleration for the practices of all Christian denominations including the Baptists, Congregationalists, Quakers, Presbyterians, and most controversially the Roman Catholics. Due to its ill defined terms it theoretically extended to all religious practice both Christian and non Christian. It caused a shockwave in the Protestant establishment helping to instigate the Glorious Revolution which immediately reversed its rulings. It also did much to prefigure the irreducible religious pluralism of modern Britain.
1688, April 27	Second issuance of the Second Declaration of Indulgence.	Most Church of England parish priests refused to read the text at Sunday worship and it triggered a widespread negative reaction leading in the short term to the Trial and Acquittal of the Seven Bishops and thereafter the Glorious Revolution.
1688, 29-30 June	The Trial of the Seven Bishops — William Sancroft (Archbishop of Canterbury), Francis Turner (Bishop of Ely), John Lake (Bishop of Chichester), Thomas Ken (Bishop of Bath and Wells), Thomas White (Bishop of Peterborough), William Lloyd (Bishop of St Asaph), Jonathan Trelawny (Bishop of Bristol) — held in Westminster Hall.	Tried for seditious libel after petitioning against James II's Declaration of Indulgence. Their acquittal became a key event leading to the Glorious Revolution.

=== Post Glorious Revolution ===
Date	Event	Significance to the Reformation in England
1688-89	The Glorious Revolution	The Glorious Revolution of 1688–1689 firmly and finally established Protestantism as the national faith under William III and Mary II. The revolution led to the passing of the Toleration Act 1689, which granted limited freedom of worship to Nonconformist (Protestantism), Nonconformist Protestants, though Roman Catholicism and Unitarianism remained excluded. The requirement of allegiance to the new monarchs caused a schism in the Church of England, as several bishops and clergy—known as the Nonjurors—refused the oath of allegiance and were deprived of office. The revolution also effectively ended any prospect of a Catholic monarch in Britain, as enshrined in the subsequent Bill of Rights 1689 and later reinforced by the Act of Settlement 1701.
1689, 3-12 September	Second London Baptist Confession ratified by a synod representing 100 Calvinistic or Particular Baptist conventicles.	The Confession had been drafted over a decade previous in 1677. This assembly reaccepted it as an orthodox and biblical formulation of Baptist doctrine and thereafter came to represent the principle doctrinal statement of the English Baptists.
1690, February–May	Nine bishops — William Sancroft (Archbishop of Canterbury), Thomas Ken (Bishop of Bath and Wells), Francis Turner (Bishop of Ely), John Lake (Bishop of Chichester), Thomas White (Bishop of Peterborough), Thomas Cartwright (Bishop of Chester), Robert Frampton (Bishop of Gloucester), William Lloyd (Bishop of Norwich), William Thomas (Bishop of Worcester) — are deprived of office for refusing to take the 1689 Oath of Allegiance to William III and Mary II.	These deprivations marked the beginning of the Nonjuring schism, as the ejected bishops and their supporters maintained loyalty to the exiled Stuart dynasty and continued episcopal succession outside the established Church.

== See also ==
- English Reformation
- Edwardian Reformation
- Elizabethan Religious Settlement
- List of Catholic martyrs of the English Reformation
- List of Protestant martyrs of the English Reformation
- Lollardy
- Timeline of the English Civil War
- Timeline of British history (1500–1599)
- Timeline of British history (1600–1699)
