= English Reformation Parliament =

16th-century English legislature

The English Reformation Parliament, which was summoned by Henry VIII on 9 August 1529, sat from 3 November 1529 until 14 April 1536. It established the legal basis for the English Reformation, passing major pieces of legislation which formally enacted the break with Rome and increased the authority of the Church of England. Under the direction of King Henry VIII, the Reformation Parliament was the first in English history to deal with major religious legislation, much of it orchestrated by, among others, the Boleyn family and Thomas Cromwell. This legislation transferred many aspects of English life away from the control of the Roman Catholic Church to control under the Crown. As well as setting a precedent for future monarchs to utilize parliamentary statutes affecting the Church of England, this strengthened the role of the Parliament of England and provided a significant transference of wealth from the representatives of the Roman Catholic Church to the English Crown.

== Background ==
By the mid-1520s, King Henry VIII was in desperate need of a male heir. His wife, Catherine of Aragon, was increasingly considered to be past child-bearing age, and in Henry’s mind, having a female on the throne (i.e, his only legitimate heir, later Mary I of England) would destabilize the country. Henry then concluded that a divorce was needed in order for him to marry Anne Boleyn and sent Cardinal Wolsey to negotiate with Pope Clement VII.

Wolsey was unable to convince Clement to grant a divorce. Frustrated with Wolsey and the English clergy as a whole, Henry then turned to combating the influence and the benefits that the Catholic clergy enjoyed in England, hoping that pressure on the Church would influence the Pope to support his cause. However, England was not powerful and important enough in Europe at this time for the Pope to pay it much attention.

Henry then consulted with his advisors including Thomas Cromwell to address the influence of canonical law in England. Cromwell orchestrated much of the legislation and ran propaganda campaigns throughout England to win over the laity. Henry called Parliament to session in 1529.

== Acts ==
The major pieces of legislation from the Reformation Parliament included:

=== 1529 Clergy legal privilege removed ===
An Act was passed to prevent the clergy from being subject to separate canonical courts. Instead, they were now to be tried in the same way as everybody else in England was and not be looked upon favourably by the courts.

=== 1530 Praemunire charges reinstated ===
In October 1530 Cromwell surprised even his mentor Wolsey by taking praemunire action against the English clergy, essentially accusing them of appealing to a power outside of the realm (i.e., the Pope) - not for a specific reason but rather the entire principle of papal authority over English law. The clergy were therefore charged with treason. Once the clergy acknowledged Henry as the head of the Church of England, charges were dropped.

=== 1532 Rome deprived of a portion of Annates normally remitted ===
The session of 1532 saw plan and purpose that had not been evident in earlier sessions.

The first Act of Annates (the Act in Conditional Restraint of Annates) was passed allowing only 5% of the money normally remitted to Rome. Annates were monies (church taxes effectively) that were collected in England and sent to Rome. They were levied on any diocese by Rome as payment in return for the nomination and papal authorization for the consecration of a bishop. One third of the first year's revenues from the particular diocese went to Rome. The King passed legislation threatening to deprive the pope of these revenues. During this year even more intensive work was done to try to get Pope Clement to agree to the divorce Henry required. The Parliament threatened that if Henry did not get his annulment/divorce within a year, then all payments to Rome would be stopped. The anti-clerical Act, "Supplication against the Ordinaries," was also passed.

=== 1533 Act in Restraint of Appeals ===
This act removed the Pope from any jurisdiction over the English crown, affairs, or lands; the English monarch was now the ultimate authority. Henry used the argument that England was an empire and therefore not subject to the Pope’s control. Ultimately, as “supreme head” of the church, this act provided Henry the ability to legally divorce Katherine and marry Anne Boleyn. Most importantly, it provided the foundation for subsequent legislative reform concerning the English church and the monarch’s authority.

=== 1534 Act Concerning Peter's Pence and Dispensations ===
Payment of Peter's Pence (a tax collected annually from householders) to the See of Rome was abolished. The Act also eradicated pluralism in the clergy (the right to hold more than one parish) and forbade English clergy from attending religious assemblies abroad.

=== 1534 (First) Succession Act ===
The Succession Act of 1533 (passed in 1534) declared Henry VIII and Catherine of Aragon's marriage invalid and Mary therefore illegitimate, which established his daughter Elizabeth (later Elizabeth I) as his heir.

=== 1534 Treasons Act 1534 ===
Henry wanted to silence critics of these changes to legislation and heirs (for example, Elizabeth Barton). As a result, Cromwell wrote legislation to ensure that any challenge to the Act of Supremacy (questioning the monarch’s authority) or the Act of Succession (questioning the line of succession) would be considered treason and punishable by death.

=== 1534 Act of Supremacy; Annates reserved to the English Crown ===
The second Act of Annates was passed, called the Act in Absolute Restraint of Annates. The annates were, along with the supremacy over the church in England, reserved to the Crown, and the English crown now took all revenue charged for the appointment of bishops. The Act of First Fruits and Tenths transferred the taxes on ecclesiastical income from the pope to the Crown. The Treasons Act 1534 made it high treason punishable by death to deny royal supremacy. The first Act of Supremacy (among other things) began the process by which the dissolution of monasteries was to be undertaken. It quickly followed the receipt of a survey called Valor Ecclesiasticus, but applied only to religious houses with an income of less than two hundred pounds a year.

=== 1536 Dissolution of the Lesser Monasteries Act ===
This act decreed that smaller monasteries with a yearly income of less than £200 throughout England would be closed.

Under the guise of addressing corrupt and usury practices of the clergy, Cromwell sought a way to not only extend Crown control of the clergy but also seize their assets. In doing so, Cromwell found a way to enrich the Crown’s struggling treasury. This action would also continue to limit the clergy’s authority. In reality, the corruption of the clergy was most likely not as severe as Cromwell purported, and most laity seemed satisfied that their spiritual and pastoral needs were being met.

Dissolving monasteries had been Cromwell’s goal for some time. By starting with the smaller monasteries first, he could avoid the accusation of displacing monks and nuns who could find a home elsewhere in larger, richer monasteries. It would also avoid angering influential patrons and supporters at Court, who largely supported those monasteries. Additionally, dissolution would also provide a means to win loyalty by enriching landowners by bestowing them these smaller monastic lands. Abbots agreed, in the hopes that the larger monasteries would be spared.

== Aftermath ==
These eight sessions of Parliament began the separation of canonical law from statutory law in England. Ultimately, these acts transitioned laws controlling many aspects of life away from Rome and under the control of Parliament and the Crown, establishing Parliament as the ultimate authority over English law without the pope's interference.

As a result, it also transferred significant wealth away from the English Roman Catholic Church to the Crown, with the added benefit of helping to boost the English economy.

== See also ==
- Scottish Reformation Parliament, commencing 1560
