= Act of Uniformity 1548 =

Act of the Parliament of England

Act of Uniformity 1548 (Note: The citation of this act by this short title was authorised by section 5 of, and the second schedule to, the Statute Law Revision Act 1948. Due to the repeal of those provisions, it is now authorised by section 19(2) of the Interpretation Act 1978.)
- Act of Parliament
- Parliament of England
- Long title: An Acte for the unyformytie of Service and Admynistracion of the Sacramentes throughout the Realme. (Note: These words are printed against this act in the second column of the second schedule to the Statute Law Revision Act 1948, which is headed "Title".)
- Citation: 2 & 3 Edw. 6. c. 1
- Territorial extent: England and Wales; Ireland

Dates
- Royal assent: 14 March 1549
- Commencement: 9 June 1549 (Note: Section 1. The Feast of Pentecost.)
- Repealed: Northern Ireland: 23 May 1950; England and Wales: 1 September 1975
Other legislation
Amended by	Statute Law Revision Act 1888; Criminal Justice Act 1948; Ecclesiastical Jurisdiction Measure 1963; Criminal Law Act 1967
Repealed by	Northern Ireland: Statute Law Revision Act 1950; England and Wales: Church of England (Worship and Doctrine) Measure 1974
Relates to	Act of Uniformity 1552; Act of Uniformity 1558; Statute Law (Repeals) Act 1969

Status: Repealed

Text of statute as originally enacted

The Act of Uniformity 1548, also known as the Act of Uniformity 1549, the Uniformity Act 1548, or the Act of Equality (2 & 3 Edw. 6. c. 1), was an act of the Parliament of England, passed on 21 January 1549 during the reign of Edward VI. Formally titled An Act for Uniformity of Service and Administration of the Sacraments throughout the Realm, it mandated the use of the newly created Book of Common Prayer across England, Wales, Calais, and all other Crown territories. It was the first act of its kind, establishing a single, uniform form of Christian worship at a time when competing branches of the faith were causing widespread social unrest, including the Prayer Book Rebellion in Cornwall and the South West of England.

The Book of Common Prayer, largely the work of Archbishop of Canterbury Thomas Cranmer, was not merely a translation of existing Latin liturgical texts but a substantially new creation, reflecting a range of reforming doctrinal influences while retaining certain Catholic elements such as altars, vestments, and prayers for the dead. The act required all clergy to conduct services in accordance with the new prayer book, with penalties escalating from the loss of one year's income and six months' imprisonment for a first offence, to deprivation of all positions for a second offence, to life imprisonment for a third.

The act proved deeply controversial. When debated in the House of Lords in January 1549, eight of the eighteen bishops present voted against it, and hostility to the new prayer book prompted rioting in several parts of the country. It was superseded by the Act of Uniformity 1552, which introduced a more overtly Protestant prayer book, before being repealed under Mary I and revived in modified form under Elizabeth I by the Act of Uniformity 1558. The major principles established in 1549 were continued and developed by the Act of Uniformity 1662, passed following the restoration of the monarchy under Charles II, most of which was itself repealed during the removal of religious discrimination in the nineteenth century.

== Nature of the Book of Common Prayer ==
The Book of Common Prayer was far from just an English-language translation of the Latin liturgical books; it was largely a new creation, mainly the work of Archbishop Thomas Cranmer, which in its text and its ceremonial directions reflected various reforming doctrinal influences (notably the breviary of Cardinal Quiñonez and the Consultation of Hermann von Wied). Compromises were evident as well; for instance, altars were retained, along with vestments, private confessions, and prayers for the dead. The first act (2 & 3 Edw. 6. c. 1) was called An Act for Uniformity of Service and Administration of the Sacraments throughout the Realm. It deemed as follows:

... and that all and singular ministers in any cathedral or parish church or other place within this realm of England, Wales, Calais, and the marches of the same, or other the king's dominions, shall, from and after the feast of Pentecost next coming, be bound to say and use the Matins, Evensong, celebration of the Lord's Supper, commonly called the Mass, and administration of each of the sacraments, and all their common and open prayer, in such order and form as is mentioned in the said book, and none other or otherwise ...

This section covers the following three points. England claimed many territories as its own with the phrase "or other of the king’s dominions". And that there was plenty of time for England's territories to become accustomed to these new laws giving them approximately one year to use the Book of Common Prayer to unify the country behind a single common practice of Faith.

Then follow penalties against those of the clergy that should substitute any other form of service, or shall not use the Book of Common Prayer, or who shall preach or speak against it:

... lest any obstinate person who willingly would disturb so godly order and quiet in his realm should not go unpunished, that it may also be ordained and enacted by the authority aforesaid, that if any manner of parson, vicar, or other whatsoever minister, that ought or should sing or say common prayer mentioned in the said book, or minister the sacraments, shall after the said feast of Pentecost next coming refuse to use the said common prayers, or to minister the sacraments in such cathedral or parish church or other places as he should use or minister the same, in such order and form as they be mentioned and set forth in the said book or shall use, wilfully and obstinately standing in the same, any other rite, ceremony, order, form, or manner of Mass openly or privily, or Matins, Evensong, administration of the sacraments, or other open prayer that is mentioned and set forth in the said book; or shall preach, declare, or speak anything in the derogation or depraving of the said book, or anything therein contained, or of any part thereof; and shall be thereof lawfully convicted according to the laws of this realm, by verdict of twelve men, or by his own confession, or by the notorious evidence of the fact, shall lose and forfeit to the king's highness, his heirs and successors, for his first offence, the profit of such one of his spiritual benefices or promotions as it shall please the king's highness to assign or appoint, coming and arising in one whole year next after his conviction: and also that the same person so convicted shall for the same offence suffer imprisonment by the space of six months, without bail or mainprize.

This provided loss of all income, which was forfeited to the Crown. Imprisonment "without bail or mainprize" meant one could not pay one's way out of prison, nor be given freedom until acquittal or the completion of the sentence.

A second offence was dealt with more harshly:

... and if any such person once convicted of any offence concerning the premises, shall after his first conviction again offend and be thereof in form aforesaid lawfully convicted, that then the same person shall for his second offence suffer imprisonment by the space of one whole year, and also shall therefore be deprived ipso facto of all his promotions; and that it shall be lawful to all patrons, donors, and grantees of all and singular the same spiritual promotions, to present to the same any other able clerk, in like manner and form as though the party so offending were dead; ...

A second offence added a year to the previous six months in prison, loss of livelihood, and any promotions and position would be given to another as if the miscreant had died. A third offence was the harshest, punished by life in prison:

... and that if any such person or persons, after he shall be twice convicted in form aforesaid, shall offend against any of the premises the third time, and shall be thereof in form aforesaid lawfully convicted, that then the person so offending and convicted the third time shall suffer imprisonment during his life.

Nothing in this act enforced attendance at public worship, but the provisions of the act apply to every kind of public worship or "open prayer", as it was called, which might take place. The act itself defines "open prayer" as "that prayer which is for others to come unto or near, either in common churches or private chapels or oratories, commonly called the service of the Church". The act also allowed for priests to marry, forbidden in the Catholic Church. The Act of Uniformity 1549 was the first act of its kind and was used to make religious worship across England and its territories consistent (i.e. uniform) at a time when the different branches of Christianity were pulling people in opposite directions, causing riots and crimes, particularly the Prayer Book Rebellion. Places such as London and the Southeast were very open to the act. The Book of Common Prayer defined a middle ground for Christian faith within England; the Act of Uniformity 1549 mandated that all English subjects move to that middle ground, so that they could put aside their differences.

== Preparation of the act ==
The act had been prepared by a committee chaired by the Archbishop of Canterbury, Thomas Cranmer. When this Bill was debated in the House of Lords in January 1549 it was very controversial. Of the eighteen bishops present at the final vote, ten voted in favour and eight against. Hostility to this act and to the new prayer book led to rioting in some areas of the country, and a major uprising in Cornwall and the South West of England. They were resisted by Catholics on one side and radical reformers such as John Hooper on the other. Yet the act stated:

... that it may be ordained and enacted by his majesty, with the assent of the Lords and Commons in this present Parliament assembled, and by the authority of the same, that all and singular person and persons that have offended concerning the premises, other than such person and persons as now be and remain in ward in the Tower of London, or in the Fleet, may be pardoned thereof; ...

These words assured that it was not an ex post facto law. Only those already convicted would remain prosecuted.

== Later history of the act ==
This act was superseded in part by the Act of Uniformity 1551 (5 & 6 Edw. 6. c. 1) which introduced the more Protestant prayer book of 1552 and imposed penalties for unjustified absence from Sunday worship; repealed by the First Statute of Repeal (1 Mar. Sess. 2. c. 2); and revived in a modified form by Elizabeth in the Act of Uniformity 1558 (1 Eliz. 1. c. 2). At the restoration of the monarchy with Charles II the Act of Uniformity 1662 (14 Cha. 2. c. 4) continued the major principles of 1549 in a rather different context and this later act was reaffirmed in 1706 as a prelude to the Act of Union which united England and Scotland under one parliament. However, most of the Act of Uniformity 1662 was repealed as part of the process of the removal of religious discrimination in the 19th century and the revision of statute law in the 20th.

=== Section 1 ===
In this section, the words from "that all and singuler person" to "thereof: And" were repealed by section 1 of, and schedule 1 to, the Statute Law Revision Act 1948 (11 & 12 Geo. 6. c. 62).

=== Section 3 ===
This section, from "it is" to "aforesaide", was repealed by section 1 of, and part I of the schedule to, the Statute Law Revision Act 1888 (51 & 52 Vict. c. 3).

In this section, the words from "forfeit to our" to "and shall" was repealed by section 10(2) of, and part III of schedule 3 to, the Criminal Law Act 1967, which came into force on 1 January 1968.

=== Section 4 ===
This section, from "it is" to "aforesaide", was repealed by section 1 of, and part I of the schedule to, the Statute Law Revision Act 1888 (51 & 52 Vict. c. 3).

=== Section 5 ===
This section, from "and be it" to first "aforesaide", was repealed by section 1 of, and part I of the schedule to, the Statute Law Revision Act 1888 (51 & 52 Vict. c. 3).

=== Section 8 ===
This section, from "and be it" to first "aforesaide", was repealed by section 1 of, and part I of the schedule to, the Statute Law Revision Act 1888 (51 & 52 Vict. c. 3).

=== Section 9 ===
This section, from "be it" to "aforesaide that", was repealed by section 1 of, and part I of the schedule to, the Statute Law Revision Act 1888 (51 & 52 Vict. c. 3).

=== Section 10 ===
This section, from "and be it" to first "aforesaide", was repealed by section 1 of, and part I of the schedule to, the Statute Law Revision Act 1888 (51 & 52 Vict. c. 3).

This section was repealed by section 83(3) of, and part III of Schedule 10 to, the Criminal Justice Act 1948 (11 & 12 Geo. 6. c. 58).

=== Section 11 ===
This section, from "and be it" to first "aforesaide", was repealed by section 1 of, and part I of the schedule to, the Statute Law Revision Act 1888.

=== Section 12 ===
This section, from "and be it" to first "aforesaide", was repealed by section 1 of, and part I of the schedule to, the Statute Law Revision Act 1888 (51 & 52 Vict. c. 3).

=== Section 13 ===
In this section, the words "and be it enacted" were repealed by section 1 of, and part I of the schedule to, the Statute Law Revision Act 1888 (51 & 52 Vict. c. 3).

== Subsequent developments ==
The words of commencement, wherever occurring, were repealed by section 1 of, and schedule 1 to, the Statute Law Revision Act 1948 (11 & 12 Geo. 6. c. 62).

The whole act was repealed for Northern Ireland by section 1(1) of, and the first schedule to, the Statute Law Revision Act 1950 (14 Geo. 6. c. 6), which came into force on 23 May 1950.

Sections 5, 12 and 13 of the act were repealed by section 87 of, and the fifth schedule to, the Ecclesiastical Jurisdiction Measure 1963 (No. 1), which came into force on 1 March 1965.

Section 11 of the act was repealed for England and Wales by section 10(2) of, and part I of schedule 3 to, the Criminal Law Act 1967, which came into force on 1 January 1968.

The whole act, so far as unrepealed, except section 7, was repealed by section 1 of, and part II of the schedule to, the Statute Law (Repeals) Act 1969, which came into force on 1 January 1970.

The whole act, so far as unrepealed, was repealed by section 6(3) of, and the second schedule to, the Church of England (Worship and Doctrine) Measure 1974 (1974, No. 3), which came into force on 1 September 1975.

== See also ==
- Act of Uniformity
- Putting away of Books and Images Act 1549

== Bibliography ==
- Williams, Perry, The Later Tudors: England, 1574–1603 pp. 44–45 Oxford: Oxford University Press 1995
