= Appointment of Bishops Act 1533 =

Act of the Parliament of England

Appointment of Bishops Act 1533 (Note: The citation of this act by this short title was authorised by section 5 of, and the second schedule to, the Statute Law Revision Act 1948. Due to the repeal of those provisions, it is now authorised by section 19(2) of the Interpretation Act 1978.)
- Act of Parliament
- Parliament of England
- Long title: An Acte restraynyng the payment of Annates, &c. (Note: These words are printed against this act in the second column of the second schedule to the Statute Law Revision Act 1948, which is headed "Title".)
- Citation: 25 Hen. 8. c. 20
- Territorial extent: England and Wales

Dates
- Royal assent: 30 March 1534
- Commencement: 15 January 1534 (Note: Start of session.)
Other legislation
Amended by	Statute Law Revision Act 1888; Criminal Law Act 1967; Statute Law (Repeals) Act 1969

Status: Amended

Text of statute as originally enacted

Revised text of statute as amended

Text of the Appointment of Bishops Act 1533 as in force today (including any amendments) within the United Kingdom, from legislation.gov.uk.

The Appointment of Bishops Act 1533 (25 Hen. 8. c. 20), also known as the Act Concerning Ecclesiastical Appointments and Absolute Restraint of Annates, is an act of the Parliament of England.

The act remains partly in force in England and Wales at the end of 2010.

It was passed by the English Reformation Parliament in 1534. It abolished all annates and made de jure the royal domination of ecclesiastical elections, which theretofore had been de facto.

After the Act of Conditional Restraints of Annates (23 Hen. 8. c. 20) of 1532, Thomas Cromwell, chief minister of Henry VIII of England, wanted to abolish all payments to the Holy See in Rome and to assign them to the King of England to strengthen royal finances. Sometime before January 1533, the Crown prepared a list of "acts necessary to be made at this Parliament," and one item included what the historian Stanford E. Lehmberg believes is probably the first known source for this Act:

Item, an act that if the Pope attempts to vex our Sovereign Lord the King of this realm, by interdiction, excommunication, or otherwise for the said marriage, which is ratified and established by this realm, that then no subject of this realm after such attempt shall pay to the Pope any manner of annates, porcions, pensions, Peterpens, ne other profit that the Pope now hath out of this realm, but that the same shall be paid to our said Sovereign to retain for his defence and the realm, till it shall please his Highness otherwise to dispose and order the same to the Pope or see apostolik.

Thus the act was meant to transfer the payment of annates from the Pope to the King and was introduced to the House of Commons of England early in the session of Parliament in 1534. The bill seemingly encountered little opposition in the Commons, possibly because of persuasion of Cromwell. In the Upper House, it did not meet with such approval and was subsequently dropped. Historians do not know the original wording of the bill nor the reason for it being dropped. After the passage of the Annates Act in 1531, however, the Lords Spiritual had complained that the annates "utterly undone and impoverished" them. Therefore, Stanford Lehmberg postulates that the Lords Spiritual probably objected to the King retaining annates.

A new bill dealing with the annates was introduced into the House of Lords on 27 February and passed it on 9 March and was approved in the Commons a week after. Parliament thus passed the act, which ended all annates. The Act as finally enacted did not require the payment of annates to the Crown, rendering it financially useless to the King, clearly a partial victory for the clergy.

The other part of the act dealt with the method of electing bishops. Before the act, the dean and chapter of a cathedral held an election for a new bishop and customarily chose the candidate supported by the King. The act bound the cathedral chapter to elect the candidate whom the King selected in his "letter missive". If the dean and chapter declined to make the election accordingly, or if the bishops of the church refused to consecrate the King's candidate, then they would be punished by praemunire. The Act therefore established royal domination of the election of bishops as an enforceable legal right with a heavy penalty.

As a result of the Cathedrals Measure 1999, the College of Canons must now perform the functions conferred by the act on the dean and chapter, and that Act accordingly has effect as if references to the dean and chapter were references to the College of Canons. This applies to every cathedral church in England other than the cathedral church of Christ in Oxford.

This act was applied by section 23(2) of the Cathedrals Measure 1931

Section 6 was repealed by section 13(2) of, and part I of schedule 4 to, the Criminal Law Act 1967, which came into force on 21 July 1967.

The preamble to, and sections 1 and 2 of, the act were repealed by section 1 of, and part II of the schedule to, the Statute Law (Repeals) Act 1969, which came into force on 1 January 1970. The repeal by the Statute Law (Repeals) Act 1969 of section 2 of the Act of Supremacy 1558 (1 Eliz. 1. c. 1) does not affect the continued operation, so far as unrepealed, of the act.

== Bibliography ==
- Stanford E. Lehmberg, The Reformation Parliament, 1529 - 1536 (Cambridge University Press, 1970).
