= Timeline of British history (1500–1599) =

There was no concept of "British history" in the 1500s, except that the word "British" was used to refer to the ancient Britons and the Welsh.

This page presents a timeline of events in the history of England and Scotland from 1500 until 1599.

- 1509 England – Henry VIII crowned and married to Catherine of Aragon
- 1513 England and Scotland – James IV and thousands of Scots killed in defeat at the Battle of Flodden
- 1521 England – Lutheran writings begin to circulate.
- 1525 England – Henry VIII seeks an annulment of his marriage, which is refused.
- 1526 England – Thomas Wolsey orders the burning of Lutheran books.
- 1529 England – Henry VIII severs ties with Rome and declares himself head of the English church.
- 1532 Scotland – Creation of the College of Justice and the Court of Session.
- 1534
  - England – Act of Supremacy passed by Henry VIII
  - Treasons Act 1534
- 1535 England – Execution of Thomas More and Cardinal John Fisher.
- 1536 England – Execution of William Tyndale in Antwerp
- 1542 Scotland – Mary, Queen of Scots, accedes to the Scottish throne
- 1547 England – Edward VI crowned King
- 1549 England – Prayer Book Rebellion in south-west.
- 1553 England – Mary I accedes to the throne.
- 1558 England – Queen Elizabeth I accedes to the throne
- 1559
  - England – Act of Supremacy 1558
  - Scotland – John Knox returns from Geneva to promote Calvinism.
- 1560 Scotland – Parliament legislates Protestant Reformation of the Church of Scotland.
- 1567 Scotland – The Catholic Mary, Queen of Scots, abdicates and flees Scotland after an uprising by Protestant lords
- 1571 England – Treasons Act 1571
- 1579 Scotland – James VI takes over government from his regent, James Douglas.
- 1582 Scotland – Establishment of the University of Edinburgh by Royal Charter.
- 1587 England and Scotland – Execution of Mary, Queen of Scots, at Fotheringhay Castle in Northamptonshire on 8 February
- 1588 England – Spanish Armada destroyed on 8 August
- 1590 England – The food prices were high and many died from starvation.
- 1592 Scotland – James VI enacts the "Golden Act" recognising the power of Presbyterianism within the Scottish church

== See also ==
- Timeline of British history
- Timeline of British history (1000–1499)
- Timeline of British history (1600–1699)
- Early modern Britain
- History of the British Isles
- History of England
- History of Ireland
- History of Northern Ireland
- History of Scotland
- History of Wales
