= Statute of Praemunire =

Act of the Parliament of England

Statute of Praemunire (Note: The citation of this act by this short title was authorised by section 5 of, and the second schedule to, the Statute Law Revision Act 1948. Due to the repeal of those provisions, it is now authorised by section 19(2) of the Interpretation Act 1978.)
- Act of Parliament
- Parliament of England
- Long title: Recital that the remedy to recover presentations is in the King's court ... Praemunire for purchasing translations bulls or any other instrument from Rome or elsewhere. (Note: These words are printed against this act in the second column of the second schedule to the Statute Law Revision Act 1948, which is headed "Title".)
- Citation: 16 Ric. 2. c. 5
- Territorial extent: England and Wales; Scotland; Ireland

Dates
- Royal assent: 1393
- Commencement: 20 January 1393 (Note: Start of session)
- Repealed: 1 February 1969 (Note: The Criminal Justice (Miscellaneous Provisions) Act 1968 (Date of Commencement) Order (Northern Ireland) 1969.)

Other legislation
- Repealed by: Criminal Law Act 1967 (England & Wales and Scotland); Criminal Justice (Miscellaneous Provisions) Act 1968 (Northern Ireland); Statute Law Revision Act 1983 (Republic of Ireland)

Status: Repealed

Text of statute as originally enacted

The Statute of Praemunire (16 Ric. 2. c. 5) was an act of the Parliament of England enacted in 1392, during the reign of Richard II. Its intention was to limit the powers of the papacy in England, by making it illegal to appeal an English court case to the pope if the king objected, or for anyone to act in a way that recognised papal authority over the authority of the king. In the 15th century it came to be read as including within its ban ecclesiastical courts inside England. The statute was later reaffirmed by the Statute in Restraint of Appeals (Ecclesiastical Appeals Act 1532) (24 Hen. 8. c. 12) in the reign of Henry VIII and was used to remove Thomas Wolsey from power. The word praemunire originally referred to the writ of summons issued against a person accused under this and similar statutes, and later came to mean offences against the statutes.

== Subsequent developments ==
The whole act was repealed by section 13 of, and part I of schedule 4 to, the Criminal Law Act 1967 for Great Britain and section 16 of, and schedule 4 to, the Criminal Justice (Miscellaneous Provisions) Act (Northern Ireland) 1968 for Northern Ireland).

The whole of 16 Ric. 2., of which this chapter was part, was repealed for the Republic of Ireland by section 1 of, and part 2 of the schedule to, the Statute Law Revision Act 1983.

== See also ==
- Praemunire
- Thomas Wolsey
