= New Learning =

In the history of ideas the New Learning in Europe is the Renaissance humanism, developed in the later fifteenth century. Newly retrieved classical texts sparked philological study of a refined and classical Latin style in prose and poetry.

Contemporaries noticed this: Thomas Howard, 3rd Duke of Norfolk lamented "It was merry in England afore the new learning came up", in relation to reading the Bible.

An earlier 'new learning' had a similar cause, two centuries earlier. In that case it was new texts of Aristotle that were discovered, with a major impact on scholasticism. A later phase of the New Learning of the Renaissance concerned the beginnings of modern scientific thought. Here Francis Bacon is pointed to as an important reference point and catalyst.

== See also ==
- Renaissance of the 12th century
- Greek scholars in the Renaissance
- Renaissance Latin
