= Forty-two Articles =

Forty-two Articles (predecessor to 39 Articles)

The Forty-two Articles were the official doctrinal statement of the Church of England for a brief period in 1553. Written by Archbishop Thomas Cranmer and published by King Edward VI's privy council along with a requirement for clergy to subscribe to it, it represented the height of official church reformation prior to the reign of Queen Elizabeth I. It staked out a position among Protestant movements of the day, opposing Anabaptist claims and disagreeing with Zwinglian positions without taking an explicitly Calvinist or Lutheran approach.

== Background ==
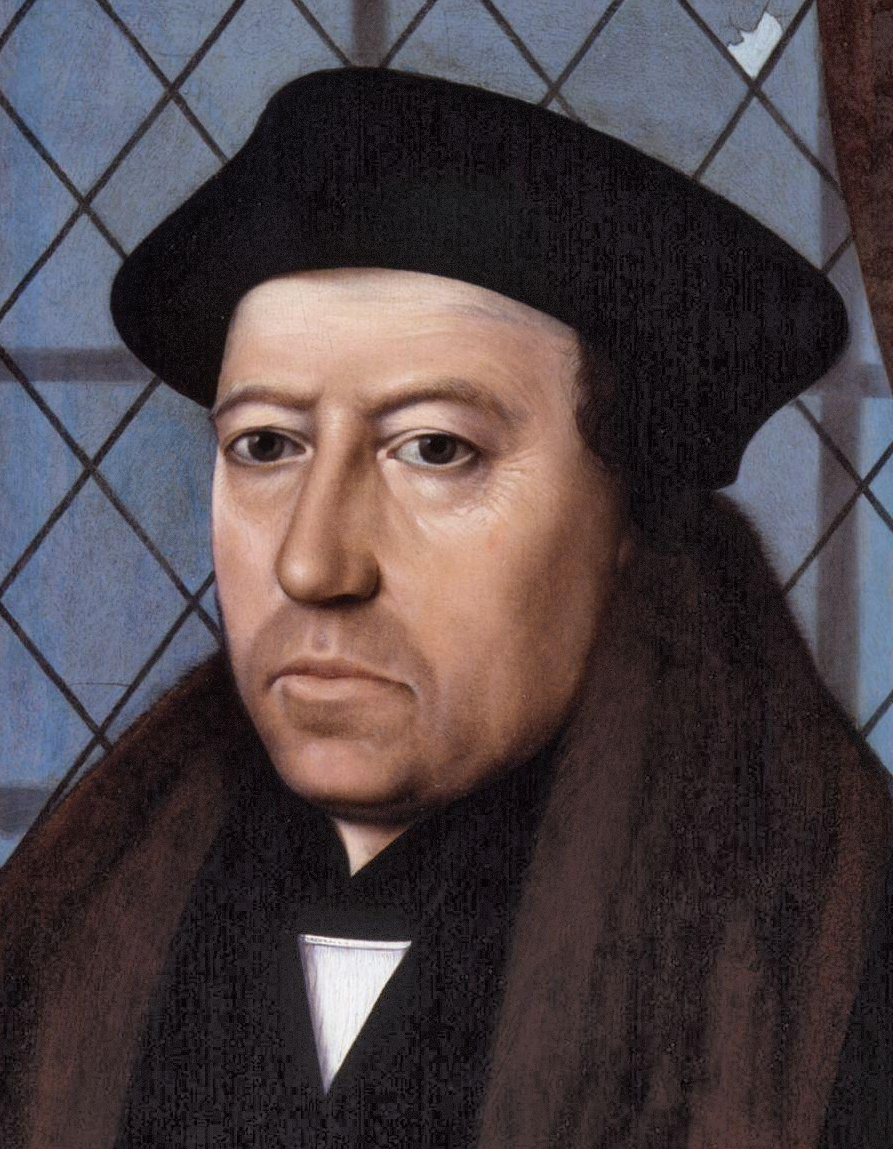
Thomas Cranmer, author of the Forty-two Articles.

After earlier doctrinal declarations (Ten Articles of 1536 and Bishops' Book of 1537), Archbishop Thomas Cranmer authored Thirteen Articles in 1538 in hopes of attaining theological unity with Lutherans as King Henry VIII sought an alliance with the Lutheran Schmalkaldic League. This was not implemented, and Henry VIII instead imposed the Six Articles of 1539, mandating clerical subscription to them and requiring married clergymen to separate from their wives.

After Henry VIII's death and King Edward VI's 1547 accession, the English Reformation again picked up steam. The Six Articles were repealed, and an opening appeared for doctrinal standards which reflected the reformation's progress. However, it would take six years before the Forty-two Articles were issued. This delay occurred because, while there was sufficient support for repealing the Six Articles, it was not clear that a majority of bishops or the House of Lords would be willing to make a more definitively Reformation-aligned statement. Furthermore, Cranmer may have held out hopes of a general ecumenical council bringing new unity among Christians under Reformation lines, or at the very least a common confession between continental Protestants and the Church of England. By 1551, it became clear that these were unlikely to occur in the short term, removing this objection.

Cranmer had begun to require new ministers and theological instructors to subscribe to specific doctrinal articles by 1549. In 1551, he presented a draft collection of doctrinal articles to bishops for consideration. The articles which, that year, Bishop John Hooper required clergy under him to subscribe to may have drawn from Cranmer's draft. But the Forty-two Articles were more ambitious in that they were intended as a definitive statement of doctrine for the Church of England, akin to the Lutheran Augsburg Confession.

In 1551, the privy council instructed Cranmer to write Articles of Religion. The following year, his draft was sent to some bishops for comment, then to the king's six chaplains, and finally the privy council. At each point, its progress towards ratification was slowed by those less convinced of Reformation doctrines, but its text appears to have remained largely as Cranmer wrote it with the help of two laymen revisers, William Cecil and John Cheke. Although it was issued under the title “Articles agreed on by the bishops and other learned men in the synod at London, in the year of our Lord God 1552”, and some bishops did gather to discuss it, it does not appear that a synod actually was convened. Nevertheless, the privy council received it from Cranmer on 24 November 1552 and issued a mandate in the king's name on 19 June 1553 that all clergy subscribe to it. There was some resistance to subscription, led by Hugh Weston, Rector of Lincoln College.

== Content ==
The title of each article is listed below. Articles that were deleted from the Thirty-nine Articles are noted in parentheses.

Forty-two Articles
1. Of faith in the Holy Trinity
2. That the Word, or Son of God was made a very Man
3. Of the going down of Christ into hell
4. Of the resurrection of Christ
5. The doctrine of Holy Scripture is sufficient to salvation
6. The Old Testament is not to be refused
7. The three Creeds
8. Of original or birth sin
9. Of free will
10. Of grace (omitted)
11. Of the justification of Man
12. Works before justification
13. Works of Supererogation
14. No Man is without sin, but Christ alone.
15. Of sin against the Holy Ghost
16. Blasphemy against the Holy Ghost (omitted)
17. Of Predestination and Election
18. We must trust to obtain eternal salvation only by the name of Christ
19. All men are bound to keep the moral commandments of the law
20. Of the Church
21. Of the authority of the Church
22. Of the authority of General Councils
23. Of Purgatory
24. No Man may minister in the Congregation, except he be called
25. Men must speak in the Congregation in such tongue, as the people understandeth
26. Of the Sacraments
27. The wickedness of the Ministers doth not take away the effectual operation of God’s ordinances
28. Of Baptism
29. Of the Lord’s Supper
30. Of the perfect oblation of Christ made upon the Cross
31. The state of single life is commanded to no Man by the word of God
32. Excommunicate persons are to be avoided
33. Traditions of the Church
34. Homilies
35. Of the books of Prayers and Ceremonies of the Church of England (omitted)
36. Of Civil Magistrates
37. Christian Men’s goods are not common
38. Christian Men may take an oath
39. The resurrection of the dead is not yet brought to pass (omitted)
40. The souls of them that depart this life do neither die with their bodies nor sleep idly (omitted)
41. Heretics called Millenarii (omitted)
42. All Men shall not be saved at the length (omitted)

Some of the articles were written in response to Roman Catholic teachings. Article 11 teaches justification by faith and rejects the Roman teaching that justification is by faith and good works. Article 12 rejects the scholastic concept of congruous merit (that good works could make people worthy of grace), and article 13 rejects the teaching of works of supererogation. Article 23 rejects Roman Catholic teachings on purgatory, indulgences, images, and invocation of saints. Article 26 rejects the teaching that sacraments confer grace automatically (ex opere operato), and article 29 rejects the doctrine of transubstantiation. Article 30 rejects the teaching that the Mass was Christ's sacrifice.

The articles also opposed arguments advanced by some Anabaptists.

The Forty-two Articles attempted, in part through some ambiguity, to smooth out differences on predestination, without leaning towards fatalism. Article 17 (nearly identical in the Thirty-nine Articles) described the comfort of the doctrine that would find further development in William Perkins's Golden Chaine among others. Along with this reformed tilt, there was also generally an influence from Lutheran sources.

Rejecting the Zwinglian extreme of sacramental bare symbolism, and the Catholic Mass as repetition of Christ's sacrifice (in contrast to Augsburg Confession Article 24 which sought to correct rather than do away with the mass), Articles 29 and 30 were similar to Calvinist views on the Lord's Supper, including a paragraph (removed in the Thirty-nine Articles) criticizing ideas of the ubiquity of Christ's body and his “reall, and bodilie presence” in the sacrament.

== Impact ==
The Forty-two Articles were part of a larger project of moving the Church of England in a more Protestant direction. This effort included the First Book of Homilies published in 1547 and the 1549 Book of Common Prayer (followed by its 1552 revision). However, shortly after their proclamation in 1553, the Catholic Queen Mary ascended to the throne and promulgation of the articles ceased.

After the 1558 accession of the Protestant Queen Elizabeth I, the Convocation of 1563 reintroduced the articles (with revisions, particularly on the eucharist) as the Thirty-nine Articles. These articles have remained part of editions of the Book of Common Prayer and as doctrinal standards for the Church of England and the Anglican Communion (though their status varies within the Communion). Their influence is felt in Methodism as well through John Wesley's Arminian revision of them as the Articles of Religion.
