= Putting away of Books and Images Act 1549 =

Act of the Parliament of England

- Act of Parliament
- Parliament of England
- Long title: An Acte for the abolishing and putting away of dives Bookes and Images.
- Citation: 3 & 4 Edw. 6. c. 10
- Territorial extent: England and Wales

Dates
- Royal assent: 1 February 1550
- Commencement: 4 November 1549 (Note: Start of session)
- Repealed: 15 December 1926
Other legislation
Amended by	Statute Law Revision Act 1888
Repealed by	Roman Catholic Relief Act 1926

Status: Repealed

Text of statute as originally enacted

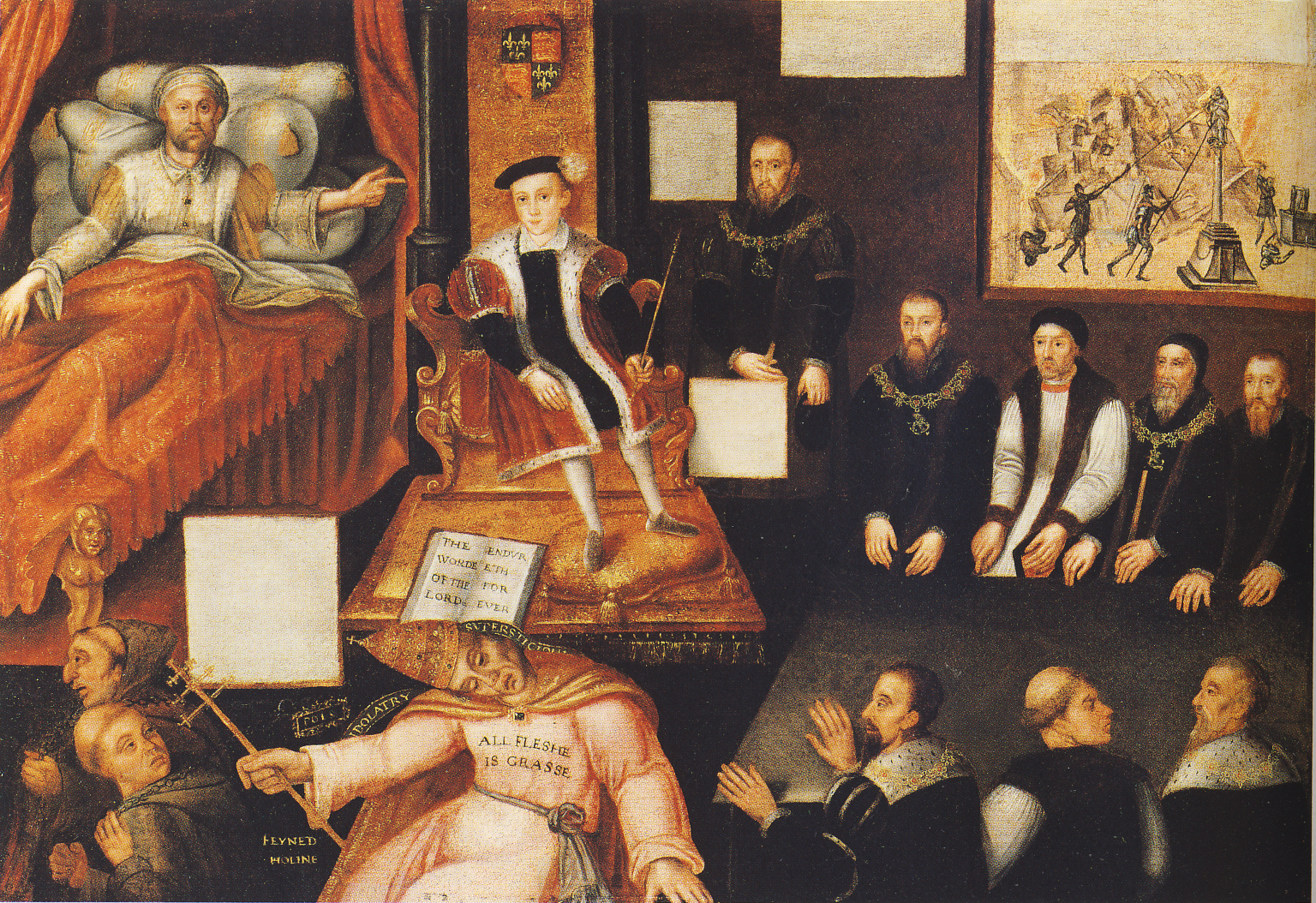
In this Elizabethan work of propaganda, the top right of the picture depicts men pulling down and destroying religious images, as power shifts from the dying King Henry VIII at left to his more staunchly Protestant son, the boy-king Edward VI, at centre.

The Putting away of Books and Images Act 1549 (3 & 4 Edw. 6. c. 10) was an act of the Parliament of England.

The preamble of the act recites:

Wheare the Kinges most Excellent Majestie hathe of late setforthe and established by auctoritie of Parliament an unyforme quyett and godlye ordre of common and open Prayer, in a Booke intituled, The Booke of Common Prayer and Admynistracion of the Sacramentes and other Rytes and Ceremonyes of the Churche after the Churche of England, to be used and observed in the saide Churche of Inglande, agreable to thordre of the prymative Churche, moche more comformable unto his lovinge Subjectes then other diversitye of service as heretofore of longe tyme hathe bene used, beinge in the saide Booke ordeyned nothing to be redd but the verie pure worde of God, or whiche is evidentlye grounded upon the same, &c.

It then proceeds to order the abolishing of all other religious books, as they tend to superstition and idolatry; and commands all persons to deface and destroy images of all kinds that were erected for religious worship, under a penalty for any to prevent the same.

The act concludes, however, with a clause emphasising that its provisions do not extend to the effigies on tomb monuments:

Provyded alwayes, That this Acte, or any thing therin conteyned shall not extende to any Image or Picture sette or graven upon anye Tombe in any Churche Chappell or Churche Yarde, onelye for a Monument of any Kinge Prince Nobleman or other dead person, whiche hath not bene commonly reputed and taken for a Saincte.

The act also stipulates that the people might still keep the primers set forth by the late king Henry VIII provided they erase the sentences of invocation, and names of popish saints.

The act was repealed by Mary I, but James I re-established it.

== See also ==
- Iconoclasm
- Timeline of the English Reformation
