= Timeline of British history (1600–1699) =

The concept of "British history" began to emerge in the 1600s, largely thanks to the attempts of King James II to assert that the Union of the Crowns of 1603 had created a Kingdom of Great Britain, which in fact did not come into existence until a century later. The governance of the Kingdom of England and the Kingdom of Scotland remained separate until 1707, and until then in most ways the Scots were excluded from sharing in the English overseas possessions.

This page presents a timeline of events in English and Scottish history from 1600 until 1699.

- 1603 – Death of Queen Elizabeth I on 24 March
- 1603 England – James VI of Scotland crowned King of England (as James I of England)
- 1603 England – Plague
- 1605 England and Scotland – on 5 November, the Gunpowder Plot is uncovered, in which Guy Fawkes and other Catholic associates attempted to blow up the king, James VI and I and the Parliament of England.
- 1618 England – Execution of Sir Walter Raleigh
- 1625 England and Scotland – Death of James VI and I on 27 March
- 1639 England and Scotland – At war until 1644 in what become known as the Bishops' Wars
- 1640 England – The Long Parliament summoned.
- 1642 England – English Civil War begins (see Timeline of the English Civil War)
- 1652 England – Tea arrives in Britain
- 1666 England 1688 England – The Glorious Revolution replaces James II with William III
- 1689 England and Scotland – The Bill of Rights 1689 and the Claim of Right Act 1689 are enacted by the Parliament of England and Parliament of Scotland

== See also ==
- Timeline of British history
- Timeline of British history (1500–1599)
- Timeline of British history (1700–1799)
- Early Modern Britain
- History of the British Isles
- History of England
- History of Ireland
- History of Northern Ireland
- History of Scotland
- History of Wales
- History of the United Kingdom
