= Ecclesiastical Appeals Act 1532 =

Act of the Parliament of England

Ecclesiastical Appeals Act 1533 (Note: The citation of this act by this short title was authorised by section 5 of, and the second schedule to, the Statute Law Revision Act 1948. Due to the repeal of those provisions, it is now authorised by section 19(2) of the Interpretation Act 1978.)
- Act of Parliament
- Parliament of England
- Long title: An Acte that the Appeles in suche Cases as have ben used to be pursued to the See of Rome shall not be from hensforth had ne used but wythin this Realme (Note: These words are printed against this act in the second column of the second schedule to the Statute Law Revision Act 1948, which is headed "Title".)
- Citation: 24 Hen. 8. c. 12
- Territorial extent: England and Wales; Ireland

Dates
- Royal assent: 7 April 1533
- Commencement: 4 February 1533 (Note: Start of session.)
- Repealed: Northern Ireland: 23 May 1950; England and Wales: 1 January 1970

Other legislation
- Amended by: Statute Law Revision Act 1888
- Repealed by: Northern Ireland: Statute Law Revision Act 1950; England and Wales: Criminal Law Act 1967, Ecclesiastical Jurisdiction Measure 1963 and Statute Law (Repeals) Act 1969
- Relates to: Ecclesiastical Jurisdiction Measure 1963; Criminal Law Act 1967; Statute of Praemunire; Act of Supremacy 1534

Status: Repealed

Text of statute as originally enacted

The Ecclesiastical Appeals Act 1533 (24 Hen. 8. c. 12), also called the Statute in Restraint of Appeals, the Act of Appeals and the Act in Restraint of Appeals, was an act of the Parliament of England.

It was passed in the first week of April 1533. It is considered by many historians to be the key legal foundation of the English Reformation.

The act, drafted by Thomas Cromwell on behalf of King Henry VIII of England, forbade all appeals to the Pope in Rome on religious or other matters, making the King the final legal authority in all such matters in England, Wales, and other English possessions. This was achieved by claiming that England was an Empire and the English crown was an Imperial Crown – Henry's historians claimed that they could trace the lineage back to Brutus and the fall of Troy.

This far-reaching measure made accepting papal authority, or following papal rulings in church, faith or other matters illegal. It was followed a year later by the Act of Supremacy 1534 (26 Hen. 8. c. 1) which made Henry "the only supreme head in earth of the Church of England called Anglicana Ecclesia, and shall have and enjoy annexed and united to the imperial crown of this realm". Those in his realms had to acknowledge this as they were by acts of Parliament that automatically changed any previous constitutional arrangements. Not to do so was high treason, which would lead to trial and execution as happened to Thomas More. The acts enabled Thomas Cranmer to finally grant King Henry his long-desired divorce from queen Catherine of Aragon, so that he could marry Anne Boleyn.

== Extract ==
WHERE by divers sundry old authentic histories and chronicles, it is manifestly declared and expressed, that this realm of England is an empire, and so hath been accepted in the world, governed by one supreme head and king, having the dignity and royal estate of the imperial crown of the same, unto whom a body politic, compact of all sorts and degrees of people, divided in terms, and by names of spiritualty and temporalty, be bounden and ought to bear, next to God, a natural and humble obedience: he being also institute and furnished, by the goodness and sufferance of Almighty God, with plenary, whole, and entire power, pre-eminence, authority, prerogative and jurisdiction, ... the body spiritual whereof having power, when any cause of the law divine happened to come in question, ... and the laws temporal, for trial of property of lands and goods, and for the conservation of the people of this realm in unity and peace, without rapine or spoil, was and yet is administered, adjudged, and executed by sundry judges and ministers of the other part of the said body politic, called the temporalty; and both their authorities and jurisdictions do conjoin together in the due administration of justice, the one to help the other.

... by his royal assent, and by the assent of the lords spiritual and temporal, and the commons, in this present parliament assembled, and by authority of the same, enact, establish, and ordain, that all causes testamentary, causes of matrimony and divorces, rights of tithes, oblations and obventions ... already commenced, moved, depending, being, happening, or hereafter coming in contention, debate, or question within this realm, or within any the king's dominions, or marches of the same, or elsewhere, whether they concern the king our sovereign lord, his heirs and successors, or any other subjects or residents within the same, of what degree soever they be, shall be from henceforth heard, examined, discussed, clearly, finally, and definitively adjudged and determined within the king's jurisdiction and authority and not elsewhere ...; any foreign inhibitions, appeals, sentences, summons, citations, suspensions, interdictions, excommunications, restraints, judgments, or any other process or impediments, of what natures, names, qualities, or conditions soever they be, from the see of Rome, or any other foreign courts or potentates of the world, or from and out of this realm, or any other the king's dominions, or marches of the same, to the see of Rome, or to any other foreign courts or potentates, to the let or impediment thereof in any wise notwithstanding.

And if it shall happen any person or persons hereafter to pursue or provoke any appeal contrary to the effect of this Act, or refuse to obey, execute, and observe all things comprised within the same, concerning the said appeals, provocations, and other foreign processes to be sued out of this realm, for any the causes aforesaid, that then every such person or persons so doing, refusing, or offending contrary to the true meaning of this Act, their procurers, fautors, advocates, counsellors, and abettors, and every of them, shall incur into the pains, forfeitures, and penalties ordained and provided in the said statute made in the said sixteenth year of King Richard II., and with like process to be made against the said offenders, as in the same statute made in the said sixteenth year more plainly appeareth.

== Subsequent developments ==
The whole act, in so far as it extended to Northern Ireland, was repealed by section 1(1) of, and the first schedule to, the Statute Law Revision Act 1950 (14 Geo. 6. c. 6), which came into force on 23 May 1950.

In section 3 of the act, the words from "in manner and forme as hereafter ensueth" to the end, and in section 4 of the act, the words from the beginning to "any other courte or courtes", were repealed for England and Wales by section 87 of, and schedule 5 to, the Ecclesiastical Jurisdiction Measure 1963 (No. 1), which came into force on 1 March 1965.

Section 2 and section 4 of the act, so far as unrepealed, were repealed for England and Wales by section 13(2) of, and part I of schedule 4 to the Criminal Law Act 1967, which came into force on 21 July 1967.

The whole act, so far as unrepealed, was repealed for England and Wales by section 1 of, and part II of the schedule to, the Statute Law (Repeals) Act 1969, which came into force on 1 January 1970.

== See also ==
- Religion in the United Kingdom
- British Emperor (Imperium maius)
- Caesaropapism
- Halsbury's Statutes
- Brexit
