= Supplication against the Ordinaries =

The Supplication against the Ordinaries was a petition passed by the House of Commons in 1532. It was the result of grievances against Church of England prelates and the clergy. Ordinaries in this Act means a cleric, such as the diocesan bishop of an episcopal see, with ordinary jurisdiction over a specified territory.

The contemporary chronicler Edward Hall records that criticism of the English prelates was popular in the House of Commons and he recorded that MPs 'sore complained of the cruelty of the ordinaries' in ex officio proceedings for heresy. Hall goes on to say:

For the ordinaries would send for men and lay accusations to them of heresy, and say they were accused, and lay articles to them, but no accuser should be brought forth, which to the Commons was very dreadful and grievous: for the party so cited must either abjure or be burned, for purgation he might make none.

Hall claims that the Commons agreed that all their grievances "should be put in writing and delivered to the King" and this was done. The Tudor historian Geoffrey Elton has written that the Supplication was put into final form by the government behind the scenes even before the issue of clerical abuses was discussed in Parliament (similar complaints had been drawn up after debate in 1529 but they were not enacted, however Thomas Cromwell had kept them). Due to the lack of firm evidence the historian Stanford Lehmberg has suggested other possibilities such as Cromwell taking it upon himself to draft the Supplication or the issue had spontaneously been raised by MPs independently. What is known is that the Supplication contained a preamble and nine charges.

The preamble stated that discord and division had arisen between the clergy and the laity in England in part because of heretical books but also upon the "uncharitable behaviour" of ordinaries. Since the division caused a "breach of your peace within this your most Catholic realm", it went on to request that the king remedy the clerical abuses which had caused the division. The charges were then listed:

- The independent legislative power of the Convocation, which to the MPs gave the Church too much power and the apparently unjust nature of ex officio proceedings;
- The use of subtle questioning by ordinaries which often trapped ignorant men in heresy trials;
- The expensive and inconvenient nuisance caused when laymen were ordered to appear in ecclesiastical courts outside their own dioceses;
- The use of excommunication for minor causes;
- The excessive fees collected in Church courts;
- The great charges made by ordinaries for institution of clergy into their benefices;
- The conferring of ecclesiastical offices upon young persons whom the bishops called their nephews;
- The large number of holy days that were observed with little devotion;
- The secular offices held by clergymen.

The Supplication ended with the MPs expressing their "marvellous fervent love" for the King. Then on 18 March the Speaker of the Commons, accompanied with knights and burgesses, presented the Supplication to the King whilst in audience with him and also demanded a dissolution of Parliament. Hall records that when the King had received the Supplication, he paused, then said:

It is not the office of a king which is a judge to be too light of credence, nor I have not, nor will not use the same: for I will hear the party that is accused speak or I give any sentence. Your book containeth divers articles of great and weighty matters, and as I perceive it is against the spiritual persons and prelates of our realm, of which thing you desire a redress and a reformation, which desire and request is mere contrary to your last petition. For you require to have the Parliament dissolved and to depart into your countries, and yet you would have a reformation of your griefs with all diligence. Although that your pain have been great in tarrying, I assure you mine hath been no less than yours, and yet all the pain that I take for your wealth is to me a pleasure; therefore if you will have profit of your complaint, you must tarry the time, or else to be without remedy.

The king went on to say he felt strongly that the Commons should not foster dissension upon him and:

Therefore I assure you, if you will not take some reasonable end now when it is offered, I will search out the extremity of the law, and then will I not offer you so much again.

When the speech ended, the Speaker and his company were forced to leave. For several weeks there seems to have been no action concerning the Supplication, but when the Convocation of Canterbury reconvened on 12 April, the first item to be discussed was the Supplication. Thus it seems the king must have asked William Warham, the Archbishop of Canterbury, for a formal reply. Warham presented it to the Convocation and asked the Lower House of the Convocation to debate it immediately. Three days after this at the next meeting, Stephen Gardiner, the Bishop of Winchester, reacted strongly against the clauses of the Supplication concerning the Convocation's ability to make Church laws (canons). The prelates accepted Gardiner's arguments and sent them to the inferior clergy who also assented to them on 19 April.

What the Convocation did immediately after this is not known to historians; however, Gardiner's reply to the Supplication is the only one which was written into the register of the Convocation. In this reply, Gardiner maintained that the Commons was wrong to claim there was a division between clergymen and laymen, and if there was any division, it was due to the "uncharitable behaviour of certain evil and seditious persons" infected with heretical opinions. Gardiner went on:

And albeit we perceive and know right well, that there be as well disposed and as well conscienced men of your Grace's Commons, in no small number assembled, as ever we knew in any Parliament; yet we be not so ignorant, but that we understand that sinister information and importuante labours and persuasions of evil disposed persons, pretending themselves to be thereunto moved by the zeal of justice and reformation, may induce right wise, sad, and constant men to suppose such things to be true, as be not so indeed.

Gardiner also upheld the legislative power of the Convocation by citing scripture and ecclesiastical traditions and claimed he saw no need for the King's permission, but did praise the King's wisdom. When this reply was sent to the King, it argued that clerical abuses in heresy trials were the fault of individuals within the clergy, not the entire body of clerical law. Warham himself included a personal reply to the accusation that the Church courts ordered exorbitant fees, claiming he instituted reforms the year before. Therefore, the Convocation's answer rejected the Supplication but couched it in humble language.

The King received Gardiner's reply around 27 April. A proposed second reply was corrected by John Fisher at Rochester in May 1532, when he met delegates sent to counsel him about the Submission of the Clergy. While this reply was fiercely unyielding in tone, historians do not know if it was ever actually presented to the King.
