= Praemunire =

English law

In English history, praemunire or praemunire facias (/ˌprimjuˈnaɪri ˈfeɪʃɪəs/ or /ˌpriːmjʊˈnɪəri ˈfeɪʃɪəs/) was the assertion or maintenance of papal jurisdiction, or any other foreign jurisdiction or claim of supremacy in England, against the supremacy of the monarch. The 14th-century law prohibiting this was enforced by the writ of praemunire facias, a writ of summons from which the law takes its name.

Praemunire may denote the statute, the writ, or the offence. In classical Latin, it means 'to fortify' and also 'to safeguard' or 'to uphold' (munire) 'in advance' or 'in preference' (prae-). From antiquity, munire was also connected, by mistaken etymology, with munera, "duties", "civic obligations". In medieval Latin, praemunire was confused with and used for praemonere, to forewarn, as the writ commanded that the sheriff do (facias) warn (praemunire) the summoned person to appear before the Court. Another way of understanding the term, more revealing of its sense, and based on its proper meaning, is "to supply support for (munire) something instead of, sooner than or before (prae-) its proper object", as someone, for instance, affording support and obedience to the papacy sooner than to the monarchy.

== Background ==
A controversy arose between the English kings and the Court of Rome concerning the filling of ecclesiastical benefices by means of papal provisions "by which the Pope, suspending for the time the right of the patron, nominated of his own authority, to the vacant benefice" the papal nominee being called a provisor. Pope Gregory IX (1227–1241) pronounced against the propriety of such provisions as interfering with the rights of lay patrons; and Pope Innocent IV expressed, in 1253, general disapprobation of these nominations.

The Statute of Provisors (1306) (25 Edw. 3. Stat. 4), passed in the reign of Edward I, was, according to Sir Edward Coke, the foundation of all subsequent statutes of praemunire. This statute enacted "that no tax imposed by any religious persons should be sent out of the country whether under the name of a rent, tallage, tribute or any kind of imposition". A much greater check on the freedom of action of the popes was imposed by the Statute of Provisors (1351) and the Statute of Praemunire passed in the reign of Edward III.

The former of these, after premising "that the Pope of Rome, accroaching to him the seignories of possession and benefices of the holy Church of the realm of England doth give and grant the same benefices to aliens which did never dwell in England, and to cardinals, which might not dwell here, and to others as well aliens as denizens, as if he had been patron or advowee of the said dignities and benefices, as he was not of right by the laws of England", ordained the free election of all dignities and benefices elective in the manner as they were granted by the king's progenitors.

== Origin ==
The Statute of Praemunire (16 Ric. 2. c. 5) was passed by the Parliament of England during the reign of Richard II, who purchased various loans from foreign creditors and rulers as well as bulls from Rome in 1392. It was only one of numerous stringent measures passed for the purpose of restraining the Holy See and all forms of papal authority in England and of eliminating in general the influence of foreign powers, especially creditors and the Holy Roman Emperor. Because the Papacy had long claimed a form of temporal supremacy over England and Ireland, from the beginning of the 14th century, papal intervention had been particularly active, more especially in two forms. The one, the disposal of ecclesiastical benefices, before the same became vacant, to men of the pope's own choosing; the other, the encouragement of resort to himself and his curia, rather than to the courts of the country, for legal justice.

== Later developments ==
The Statute of Praemunire (the first statute so called) (1353), though especially levelled at the pretensions of the Roman Curia, was also levelled against the pretensions of any foreign power and therefore was created to maintain the independence of the crown against all pretensions against it. By it, the king "at the grievous and clamorous complaints of the great men and commons of the realm of England" enacts "that all the people of the king's ligeance of what condition that they be, which shall draw any out of the realm in plea" or any matter of which the cognizance properly belongs to the king's court shall be allowed two months in which to answer for their contempt of the king's rights in transferring their pleas abroad. The penalties which were attached to the offence under this statute involved the loss of all civil rights, forfeiture of lands, goods and chattels, and imprisonment during the royal pleasure.

Many other statutes followed that of 1353, but that which was passed in the sixteenth year of Richard II's reign is, as mentioned before, usually referred to as the Statute of Praemunire. This statute, after first stating "that the right of recovering the presentments to churches, prebends, and other benefices ... belongeth only to the king’s court of the old right of his crown, used and approved in the time of all his progenitors kings of England", proceeds to condemn the practice of papal translation, and after rehearsing the promise of the three estates of the realm to stand with the king in all cases touching his crown and his regality, enacts "that if any purchase or pursue, or cause to be purchased or pursued in the court of Rome, or elsewhere, any such translations, processes, and sentences of excommunications, bulls, instruments or any other things whatsoever ... he and his notaries, abettors and counsellors" shall be put out of the king's protection, and their lands escheat.

Praemunire declined in importance, but experienced a resurgence under Henry VIII as the Protestant Reformation unfolded. First individuals were indicted for praemunire, then groups of clergy, and lastly the entire English clergy was accused of being agents of a foreign power (the Pope). The fall of both Lord Chancellor Cardinal Thomas Wolsey and Lord Great Chamberlain Thomas Cromwell was precipitated by a charge of praemunire. William Barlow was pardoned by the crown for the crime in 1550 when he made a visitation at Wells deanery. In time, Henry asserted himself as "of the Church of England in Earth under Jesus Christ Supreme Head", and the clergy of the Church of England no longer answered to a foreign power.

During the 19th century the Camerlengo of the time would on occasion communicate the death of a Pope to the British monarch (along with other rulers), and made occasional other communications. There was some discussion as to whether the Statute of Praemunire meant that no response could be made: the compromises reached included conveying messages on a 'private' rather than 'official' level, or going via the Hanoverian minister at London (responding as King of Hanover). Eventually it was decided that there was no legal obstacle to establishing formal diplomatic relations.

The abolition in 1870 of forfeiture as a penalty for treason and felony did not apply to praemunire because it was a misdemeanour.

As of the Criminal Law Act 1967 coming into effect, praemunire facias is no longer an offence in England, Wales or Northern Ireland. Afterwards, the European Communities Act 1972 extended the jurisdiction of the European Court of Justice to the United Kingdom. Nevertheless, in a speech at the 2018 Conservative Party Conference, during the political controversies associated with the Brexit negotiations, Boris Johnson claimed that the authors of the Chequers plan risked prosecution for praemunire. The Times, in a fact-check of Johnson's speech, noted that praemunire had been repealed 51 years previously.

== Acts concerning praemunire ==
- Suffragan Bishops Act 1534
- Act of Supremacy (Ireland) 1560
- Habeas Corpus Act 1679
- Criminal Law Act 1967
