= Deutsche Biographische Enzyklopädie =

Literary work

The Deutsche Biographische Enzyklopädie (DBE) is a biographical dictionary published by Walther Killy and Rudolf Vierhaus (from the third to fourth volume), the first edition of which was published from 1995 to 2003 in 13 volumes by K. G. Saur Verlag. Between 2005 and 2008 a second twelve-volume, revised and extended edition was published.

== Profile ==
The first issue of the German Biographical Encyclopedia contained articles on around 56,000 people. In the second edition, this number grew to around 63,000 people. The majority of the articles are short biographies compiled by the editorial staff; in addition there are around 1,300 detailed personal articles written by experts and signed by name.

The period of coverage started with the beginning of the written tradition and continues to the present day – with the exception of living persons. It documents life and work, origin, educational background, influential encounters, significant works and achievements, friendships, membership of groups and associations, reception, in special cases prizes and honours. The geographical area to which the DBE refers is defined by the German language. In addition to people from Germany, Austria and German-speaking Switzerland, which in historical perspective also include those from Alsace, the Baltic States, South Tyrol, etc., the DBE also includes emigrants or German-speaking minorities abroad.

== Criticism of the first edition ==
In contrast to the Neue Deutsche Biographie (NDB), the DBE was largely developed as a compilation from other reference works, with only a very small proportion of articles written specifically for the DBE. It could be realized in a comparatively short period of time, but also attracted criticism. Thus the FAZ reviewer Patrick Bahners called the DBE a "powerful write-off enterprise".

Ernst Klee, who accused the DBE of glossing over Nazi careers, criticized the content. It reflects "denazification in the most beautiful way, especially in the field of science. There are no more Nazis. Even the highest ranking physicians in Himmler's Schutzstaffel, the elite of Nazi terror, come as honorable ordinaries to encyclopedia honors.

The reviewer of the Internet review magazine literaturkritik.de, an entrepreneurial activity at the University of Marburg, provides a general overview of the origins of the individual articles of the first edition and indicates concrete needs for improvement.

== Trivia ==
The encyclopedia also contains an entry about a fictitious person (Carl August von Schimmelthor). Among those involved in the publication are the medical historian Dietrich von Engelhardt and the church historian Bernd Moeller.

== Editions ==
Deutsche Biographische Enzyklopädie,

- Volumes 1–13, Munich/Leipzig (also New Providence, London und Paris), K. G. Saur 1995–2003, ISBN 3-598-23160-1.
  - vol. 11 in 2 parts: "Nachträge / Personenregister" ISBN 3-598-23171-7.
  - vol. 12 in 2 parts: "Ortsregister / Berufsregister" ISBN 3-598-23172-5.
  - vol. 13: "Supplement" ISBN 3-598-23173-3.
  - Paperback edition first 10 volumes. dtv Verlagsgesellschaft, Munich 2001, ISBN 3-423-59053-X.
  - CD-Ausgabe, ISBN 3-598-40360-7.
- 2nd revised and extended edition. Twelve volumes. 2005–2008, ISBN 978-3-598-25030-9.
  - Since 2009 also available for rent via the Internet and on data media for purchase from Walter de Gruyter publishing house
