= Long Reformation =

Long Reformation is a historiographic term that interprets the process of the Protestant Reformation, particularly the English Reformation, as longer and broader than the traditional chronology of happening through mid-sixteenth-century legislation.

The concept was shaped by revisionist reformation historians such as Jack Scarisbrick, Christopher Haigh and Eamon Duffy, who emphasised the vitality of late medieval Catholicism and the slow, uneven pace of Protestantisation and was first used by Duffy in 1996. The term describes a multi generational process of religious, cultural and social change in Europe from the late medieval period through to as late as the eighteenth century.

The concept has been compared to confessionalisation an approach which also emphasises the protracted and multifaceted nature of religious change and is used in continental European, particularly German, historiography to analyse how Catholic and Protestant Continental churches and states collaborated in social disciplining which between the Peace of Augsburg (1555) and the Thirty Years' War (1618–1648) formed religious identities and consolidated political authority.

The Long Reformation thesis has also been linked to the work of French historian Jean Delumeau, whose studies of Catholic reform and the persistence of popular religion emphasised gradual processes of cultural and religious change across early modern Europe.

== See also ==
- European wars of religion
- Medieval Restorationism

== Sources ==
- Duffy, Eamon (1992). The Stripping of the Altars: Traditional Religion in England, 1400–1580. New Haven: Yale University Press.
- Duffy, Eamon (2003). "The Long Reformation: Catholicism, Protestantism and the Multiformity of Reform". In Tyacke, Nicholas (ed.). England's Long Reformation: 1500–1800. London: Routledge. ISBN 9781135360948.
- Delumeau, Jean (1977). Catholicism between Luther and Voltaire. London: Burns & Oates.
- Delumeau, Jean (1990). Sin and Fear: The Emergence of a Western Guilt Culture, 13th–18th Centuries. New York: St. Martin's Press.
- Gwyn, Peter (20 December 1984). "Scarisbrick's Bomb". London Review of Books.
- Haigh, Christopher (1993). English Reformations: Religion, Politics, and Society under the Tudors. Oxford: Clarendon Press.
- Loewenstein, David (2020). Early Modern Literature and England’s Long Reformation.
- Marshall, Peter (February 2012). "THE NAMING OF PROTESTANT ENGLAND". Past & Present (214). Oxford University Press: 87–128.
- Reinhard, Wolfgang (1989). Reformation, Counter-Reformation, and Confessionalization. Oxford: Oxford University Press.
- Scarisbrick, J. J. (1984). The Reformation and the English People. Oxford: Blackwell.
- Schilling, Heinz (1992). Religion, Political Culture and the Emergence of Early Modern Society: Essays in German and Dutch History. Leiden: Brill.
- Taylor, Stephen (2025). "The long Reformation: conceptualisation and periodisation in English religious history between the 16th and 18th centuries" (PDF). East Asian Journal of British History. 9: 99–111.
- Tyacke, Nicholas, ed. (2003). England's Long Reformation: 1500–1800. London: Routledge. ISBN 9781135360948.
