= English Reformation =

16th-century Christian movement in England

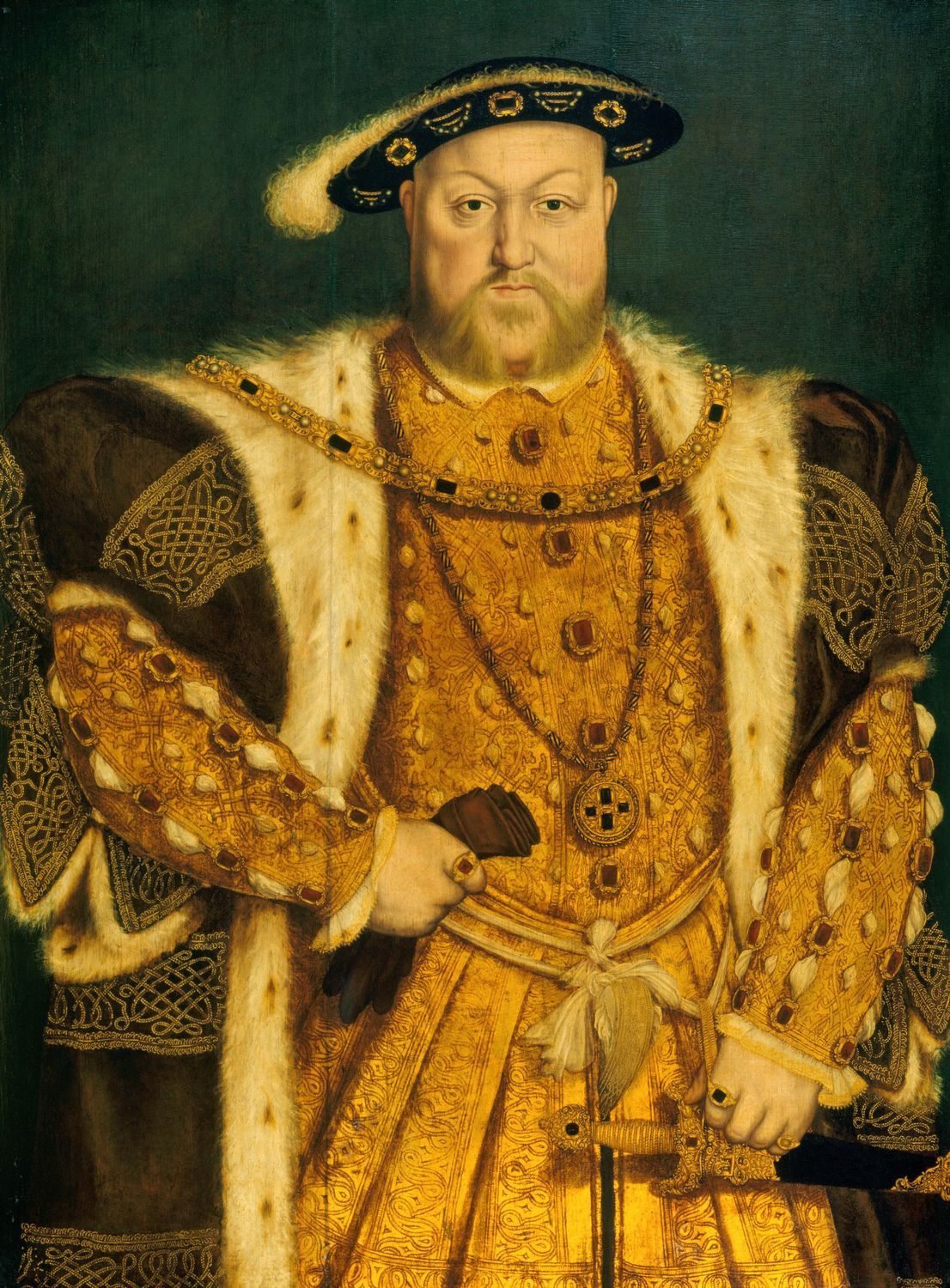
King Henry VIII initiated the separation of the English Church from the Catholic Church by declaring himself, not the Pope, the Supreme Head of the Church of England. Portrait by Hans Holbein the Younger. Thyssen-Bornemisza Museum, Madrid.

The English Reformation began in 16th-century England when the Church of England broke away first from the authority of the pope and bishops over the King and then from some doctrines and practices of the Catholic Church. These events were part of the wider European Reformation: various religious and political movements that affected both the practice of Christianity in Western and Central Europe and relations between church and state.

Disputes between the Church and the Crown had a long history in England as in other areas of Europe, and what is known as the English Reformation initially had more of a political than a theological nature. (Note: According to Scruton (1996, p. 470), "The Reformation must not be confused with the changes introduced into the Church of England during the 'Reformation Parliament' of 1529–36, which were of a political rather than a religious nature, designed to unite the secular and religious sources of authority within a single sovereign power: the Anglican Church did not until later make any substantial change in doctrine.") In 1527, Henry VIII sought an annulment of his 18-year marriage to Catherine of Aragon but Pope Clement VII refused. In response, the Reformation Parliament (1529–1536) passed laws abolishing papal authority in England and declared Henry to be head of the Church of England. Final authority in doctrinal disputes now rested with the monarch. Though a religious traditionalist himself, Henry relied on Protestants to support and implement his religious agenda.

Ideologically, the groundwork for the subsequent Reformation was laid by Renaissance humanists who believed that the Scriptures were the best source of Christian theology and criticised religious practices that they saw as superstitious. By 1520, Martin Luther's new ideas were known and debated in England, but Protestants were a religious minority and heretics under the law. The Church had often been politically powerful and was very wealthy. The dissolution of the monasteries and other seizures of ecclesiastical wealth during the English Reformation enriched the so-called Tudor kleptocracy.

The theology and liturgy of the Church of England became markedly Protestant during the reign of Henry's son Edward VI (r. 1547–1553) largely along lines laid down by Archbishop Thomas Cranmer. Under Mary I (r. 1553–1558), Roman Catholicism was briefly restored. The Elizabethan Religious Settlement re-established the Church of England. Nevertheless, disputes over the structure, theology and worship of the Church of England continued for generations.

The English Reformation concluded largely during the reign of Elizabeth I (r. 1558–1603) but some scholars refer to a Long Reformation stretching into the 17th and 18th centuries. This period includes the violent disputes over religion during the Stuart period, most famously the English Civil War, which resulted in the rule of Oliver Cromwell, a Puritan. After the Stuart Restoration and the Glorious Revolution, the Church of England remained the established church, but a number of nonconformist churches now existed whose members suffered various civil disabilities until these were removed many years later. A substantial but dwindling minority of people from the late-16th to early-19th centuries remained Catholics in England—their church organisation remained illegal until the Roman Catholic Relief Act 1829.

== Competing religious ideas ==
=== Late medieval English Catholicism ===
The Medieval English church was part of the larger Catholic Church led by the pope in Rome. The dominant view of salvation in the late medieval church taught that contrite persons should cooperate with God's grace towards their salvation (see synergism) for example by performing charitable acts, which would also merit reward in Heaven for the saved. God's grace was ordinarily given through the seven sacraments—Baptism, Confirmation, Marriage, Holy Orders, Anointing of the Sick, Penance and the Eucharist. The Eucharist was celebrated during the Mass, the central act of Catholic worship. In this service, a priest consecrated bread and wine to become the body and blood of Christ through transubstantiation. The church taught that, in the name of the congregation, the priest offered to God the same sacrifice of Christ on the cross that provided atonement for the sins of humanity.

The Mass was also an offering of prayer by which the living could help the saved souls in purgatory. While genuine penance removed the guilt attached to sin, Catholicism taught that a penalty could remain in the case of imperfect contrition. It was believed that most people would end their lives with these penalties unsatisfied and would have to spend "time" in purgatory. Time in purgatory could be lessened through indulgences and prayers for the dead, which were made possible by the communion of saints. Religious guilds sponsored intercessory Masses for their members through chantries. The monks and nuns who lived in monasteries prayed for souls as well. By popular demand, "prayer for the dead dominated Catholic devotion in much of northern Europe."

English Catholicism was strong and popular in the early 1500s. One measure of popular engagement is financial contribution. Besides paying obligatory tithes, English people voluntarily donated large amounts of money to their parish churches.

=== Humanism ===
Some Renaissance humanists, such as Erasmus (who lived in England for a time), John Colet and Thomas More, called for a return ad fontes ("back to the sources") of Christian faith—the scriptures as understood through textual, linguistic, classical and patristic scholarship—and wanted to make the Bible available in the vernacular. Humanists criticised so-called superstitious practices and clerical corruption, while emphasising inward piety over religious ritual. Some of the early Protestant leaders went through a humanist phase before embracing the new movement.

A notable early use of the English word reformation came in 1512, when the English bishops were called together by Henry VIII, notionally to discuss the extirpation of the rump Lollard heresy. John Colet (then working with Erasmus on the establishment of his school) gave a notoriously confrontational sermon on Romans 12:2 ("Be ye not conformed to this world, but be ye reformed in the newness of your minds") saying that the first to reform must be the bishops themselves, then the clergy, and only then the laity.

=== Lutheranism ===
The Protestant Reformation was initiated by Martin Luther, a German friar. By the early 1520s, Luther's views were known and disputed in England. The main plank of Luther's theology was justification by faith alone rather than by faith then good works. In other words, justification is a gift from God received through faith.

If Luther was correct, then the Mass, the sacraments, charitable acts, prayers to saints, prayers for the dead, pilgrimage, and the veneration of relics do not mediate divine favour. To believe otherwise would be superstition at best and idolatry at worst. Early Protestants portrayed Catholic practices such as confession to priests, clerical celibacy, and requirements to fast and keep vows as burdensome and spiritually oppressive. Not only did purgatory lack any biblical basis according to Protestants, but the clergy were also accused of leveraging the fear of purgatory to make money from prayers and masses. The Catholics countered that justification by faith alone, without the need for penance or the consequence of purgatory, was a licence to sin.

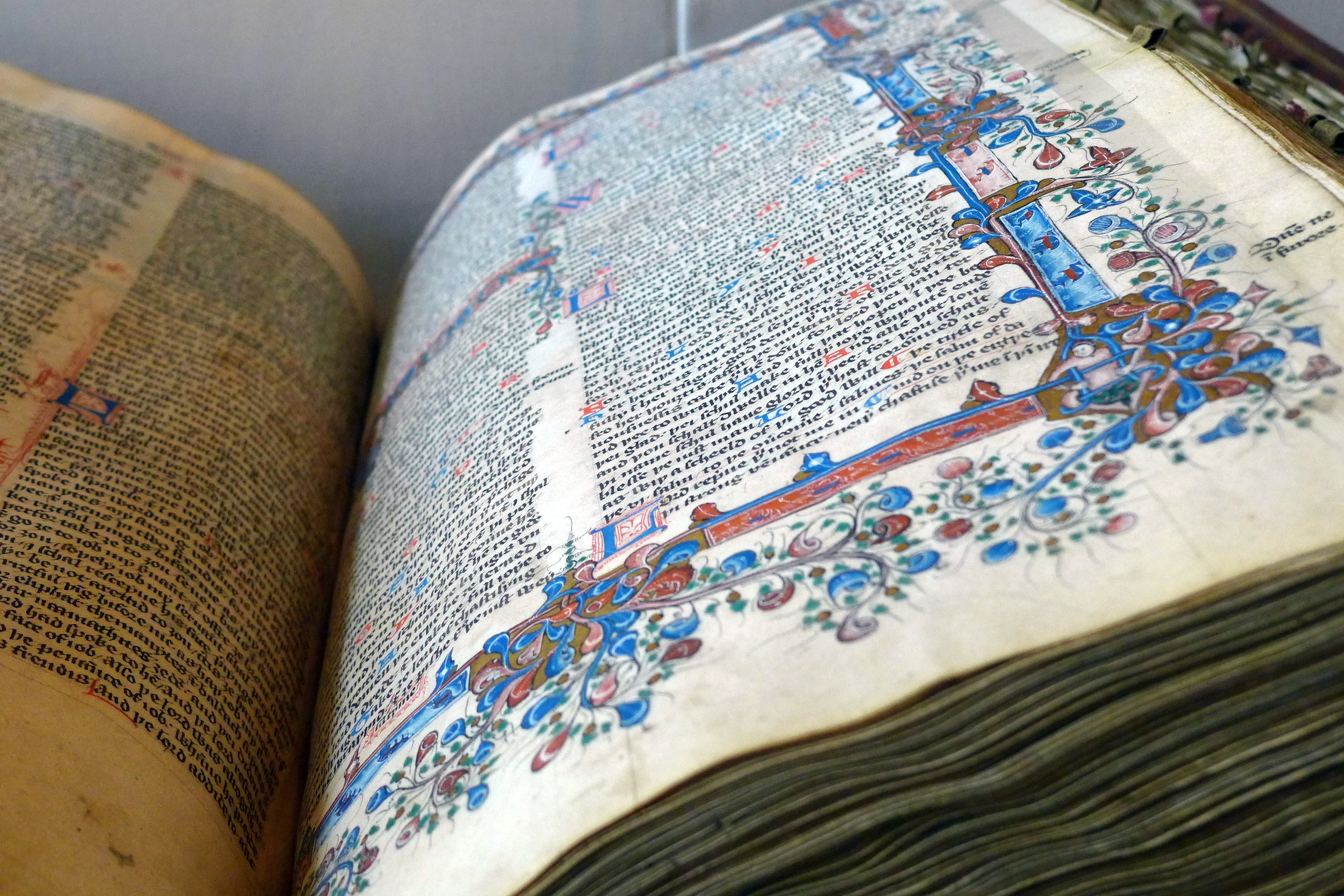
The Tyndale Bible was the basis for later English translations.

The publication of William Tyndale's English New Testament in 1526 helped to spread Protestant ideas. Printed abroad and smuggled into the country, the Tyndale Bible was the first English Bible to be mass-produced; there were probably 16,000 copies in England by 1536. Tyndale's translation was highly influential, forming the basis of all subsequent English translations until the 20th century. An attack on traditional religion, Tyndale's translation included an epilogue explaining Luther's theology of justification by faith, and many translation choices were designed to undermine traditional Catholic teachings. Tyndale translated the Greek word charis as favour rather than grace to de-emphasise the role of grace-giving sacraments. His choice of love rather than charity to translate agape de-emphasised good works. When rendering the Greek verb metanoeite into English, Tyndale used repent rather than do penance. The former word indicated an internal turning to God, while the latter translation supported the sacrament of confession.

The Protestant ideas were popular among some parts of the English population, especially among academics and merchants with connections to continental Europe. Protestant thought was better received at the University of Cambridge than at the University of Oxford. A group of reform-minded Cambridge students (known by the moniker "Little Germany") met at the White Horse tavern from the mid-1520s. Its members included Robert Barnes, Hugh Latimer, John Frith, Thomas Bilney, George Joye, and Thomas Arthur.

== Henrician Reformation ==
The Henrician Reformation refers to the period between around 1527 to 1547 when King Henry VIII of England took a series of measures to get matrimonial, political and spiritual authority away from the Pope and Catholic bishops in favour of himself, as well as confiscating considerable property and wealth.

Notable events in this period include:

- The "King's Great Matter" of the annulment or divorce of his first marriage to Catherine of Aragon in order to marry Anne Boleyn.
- The Act of Supremacy to install Henry as the supreme head of the English church.
- The Dissolution of the Monasteries where religious houses and their property were destroyed or sold.
- Demonstrations of civil unrest such as the Pilgrimage of Grace.
- Temporary reversals of some reforms.

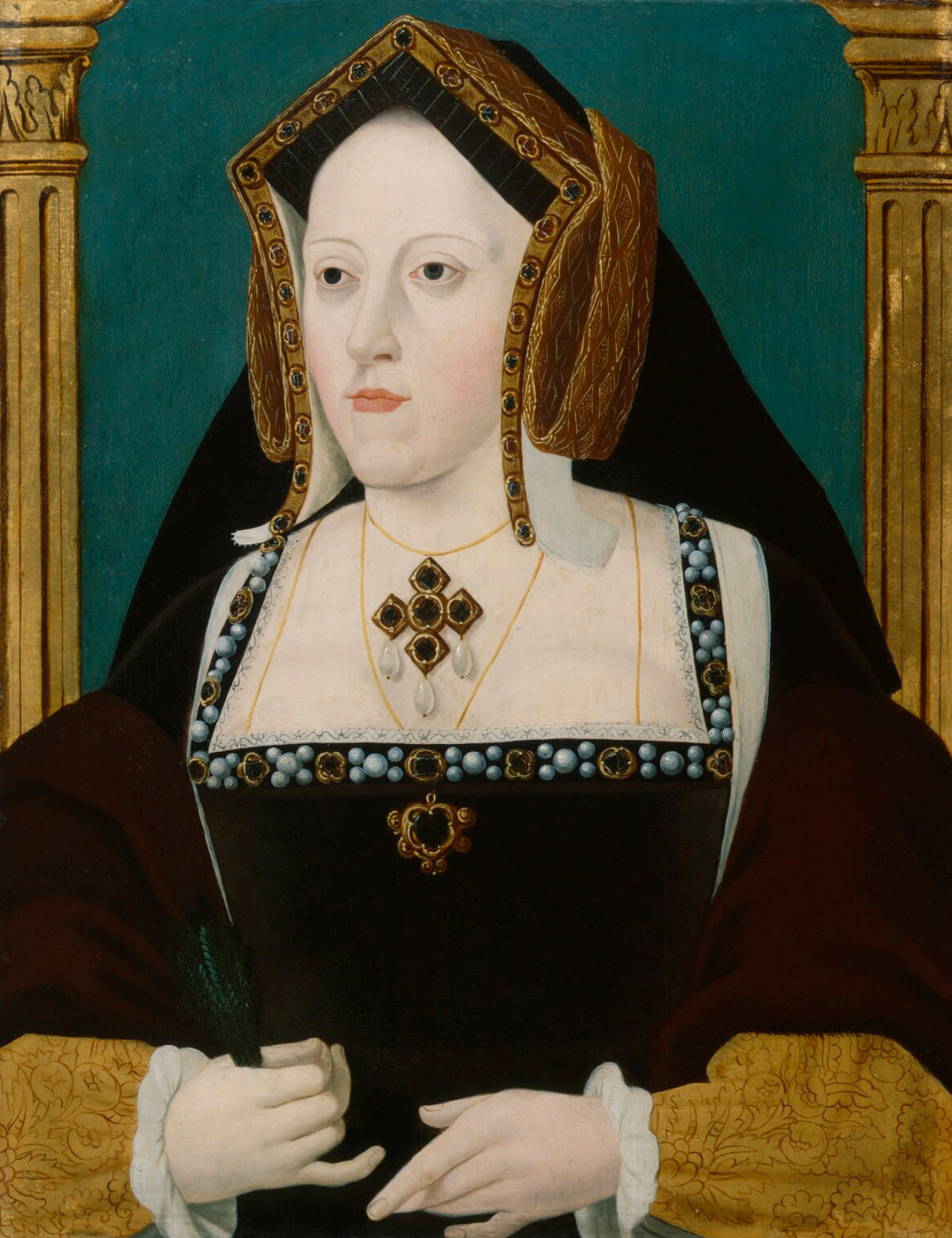
Catherine of Aragon, Henry VIII's first wife. Attributed to Joannes Corvus, National Portrait Gallery, London.

The First Act of Supremacy made Henry Supreme Head of the Church of England and disregarded any "usage, custom, foreign laws, foreign authority [or] prescription". English historian Geoffrey Elton called this Act an "essential ingredient" of the "Tudor revolution" in that it expounded a theory of national sovereignty. In case this should be resisted, Parliament passed the Treasons Act 1534, which made it high treason punishable by death to deny royal supremacy. The following year, ex-Chancellor Thomas More and Cardinal John Fisher were executed under this legislation.

The break with Rome gave Henry the power to administer the English Church, tax it, appoint its officials, and control its laws. It also gave him control over the church's doctrine and ritual. While Henry remained, in his mind, a traditional Catholic, his most important supporters in breaking with Rome were the Protestants. Yet, not all of his supporters were Protestants. Some were Catholics, such as Stephen Gardiner, opposed to the new theology but coming to hold that papal supremacy was not essential to the Church of England's identity. The English population mostly remained traditionalist at this stage. (Note: "The traditionalists, the most prominent of whom were by the mid-1540s Thomas Howard, Duke of Norfolk, and Stephen Gardiner, bishop of Winchester, undoubtedly represented by a wide margin the greatest part of England’s population.")

The historian Diarmaid MacCulloch in his study of The Later Reformation in England, 1547–1603 argues that after 1537, "England's Reformation was characterized by its hatred of images." The shrine and bones of Thomas Becket, considered by many to have been martyred in defence of the church's liberties, were destroyed at Canterbury Cathedral.

== Edwardian Reformation ==
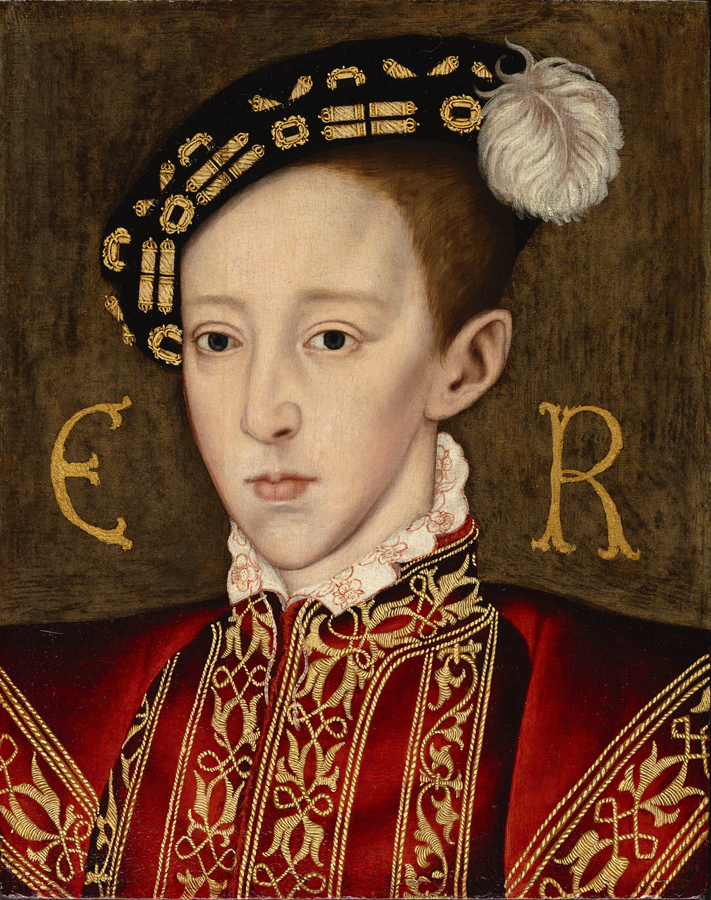
King Edward VI, under whose reign the Church of England was reformed in a more Protestant direction

When Henry died in 1547, his nine-year-old son, Edward VI, acceded to the throne. During the seven years of Edward's reign, a Protestant establishment would gradually implement religious changes that were "designed to destroy one Church and build another, in a religious revolution of ruthless thoroughness".

The second year of Edward's reign was a turning point for the English Reformation; many people identified the year 1548, rather than the 1530s, as the beginning of the English Church's schism from the Catholic Church. On 8 March, a royal proclamation announced the first major reform of the Mass and of the Church of England's official eucharistic theology. The Order of the Communion was a series of English exhortations and prayers that reflected Protestant theology and were inserted into the Latin Mass. A significant departure from tradition was that individual confession to a priest—long a requirement before receiving the Eucharist—was made optional and replaced with a general confession said by the congregation as a whole.

A new prayer book and liturgy, the Book of Common Prayer, was authorised by the Act of Uniformity 1549. It provided Protestants with a service free from what they considered superstition, while maintaining the traditional structure of the mass but provoked a rebellion—later known as the Prayer Book Rebellion—in the West Country, the West Midlands and Yorkshire, with considerable loss of life.

In March 1551 the Privy Council ordered the confiscation of remaining church plate and vestments "for as much as the King's Majestie had neede [sic] presently of a mass of money".

King Edward became seriously ill in February and died in July 1553. Before his death, Edward was concerned that Mary, his devoutly Catholic sister, would overturn his religious reforms. A new plan of succession was created in which both of Edward's sisters Mary and Elizabeth were bypassed on account of illegitimacy in favour of the Protestant Jane Grey, the granddaughter of Edward's aunt Mary Tudor and daughter-in-law of the Duke of Northumberland: her disputed reign lasted nine days. However, on 19 July, the Privy Council proclaimed Mary queen to the acclamation of the crowds in London.

== Marian Restoration ==
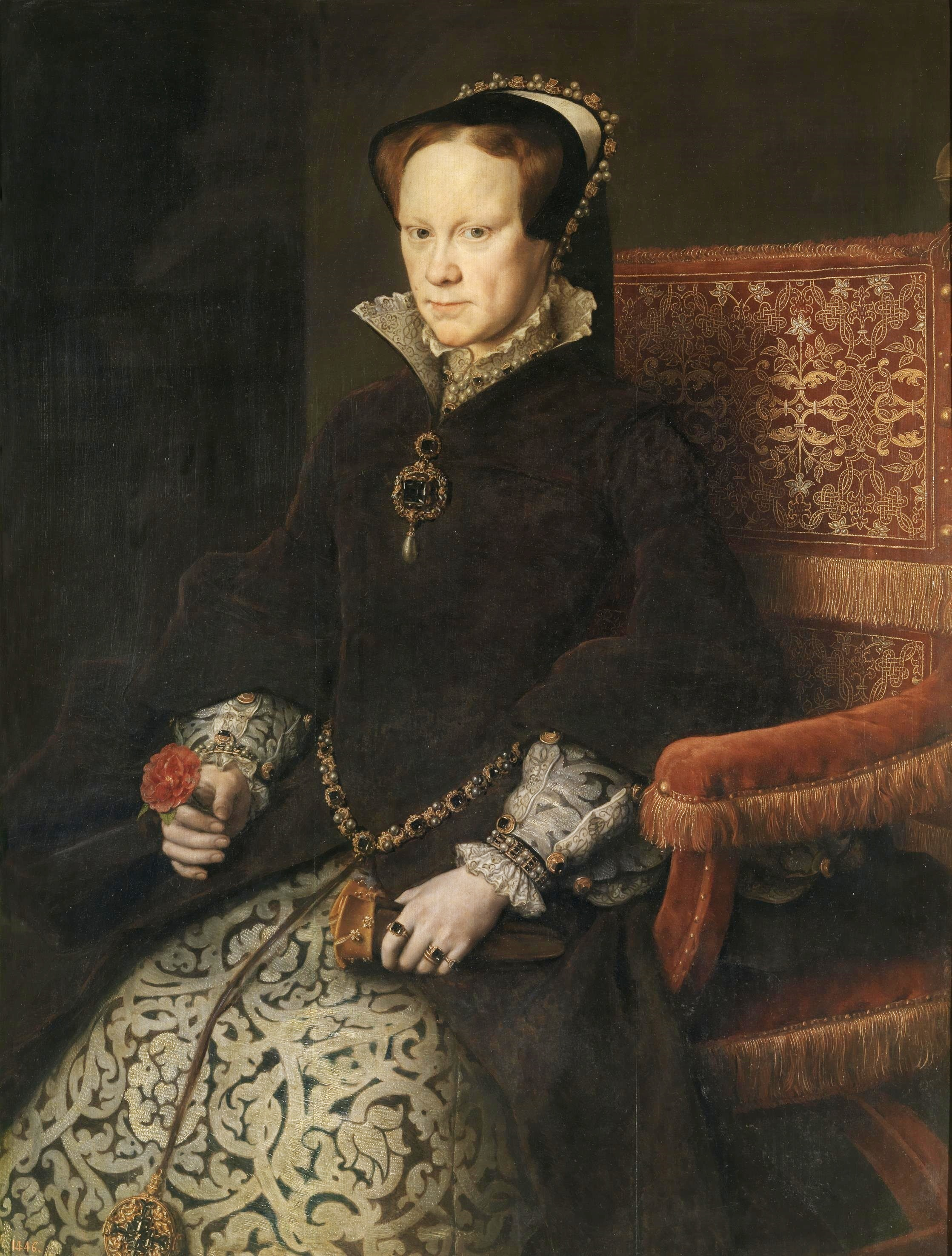
Queen Mary I of England restored the English allegiance to Rome.

The Marian Restoration refers to the period 1553 to 1558 in England, i.e. the reign of Queen Mary I of England, where the changes of the Edwardian Reformation were to a large extent rolled back away from Protestantism and back towards Catholicism. Before any official sanction, Latin Masses began reappearing throughout England, despite the 1552 Book of Common Prayer remaining the only legal liturgy.

Mary began her reign cautiously by emphasising the need for tolerance in matters of religion and proclaiming that, for the time being, she would not compel religious conformity. However Protestants who refused to conform remained an obstacle to Catholic plans. In 1555, the initial reconciling tone of the regime began to harden with the revival of the English late medieval civil heresy laws, which authorised capital punishment as a penalty for heresy. After her death, the Queen became known as "Bloody Mary" due to the influence of the books of John Foxe, one of the Marian exiles.

Despite these obstacles, the 5-year restoration was successful. There was support for traditional religion among the people, and Protestants remained a minority.

Although deeply concerned about her restoration of Catholicism, Mary ultimately recognized Elizabeth as her heir on 6 November 1558 on her deathbed. This decision was reportedly influenced by Elizabeth's vow of Catholic faith—including her belief in the Real Presence—which she affirmed under oath during Mary's final illness. Elizabeth became queen when Mary died on 17 November.

== Elizabethan Settlement ==
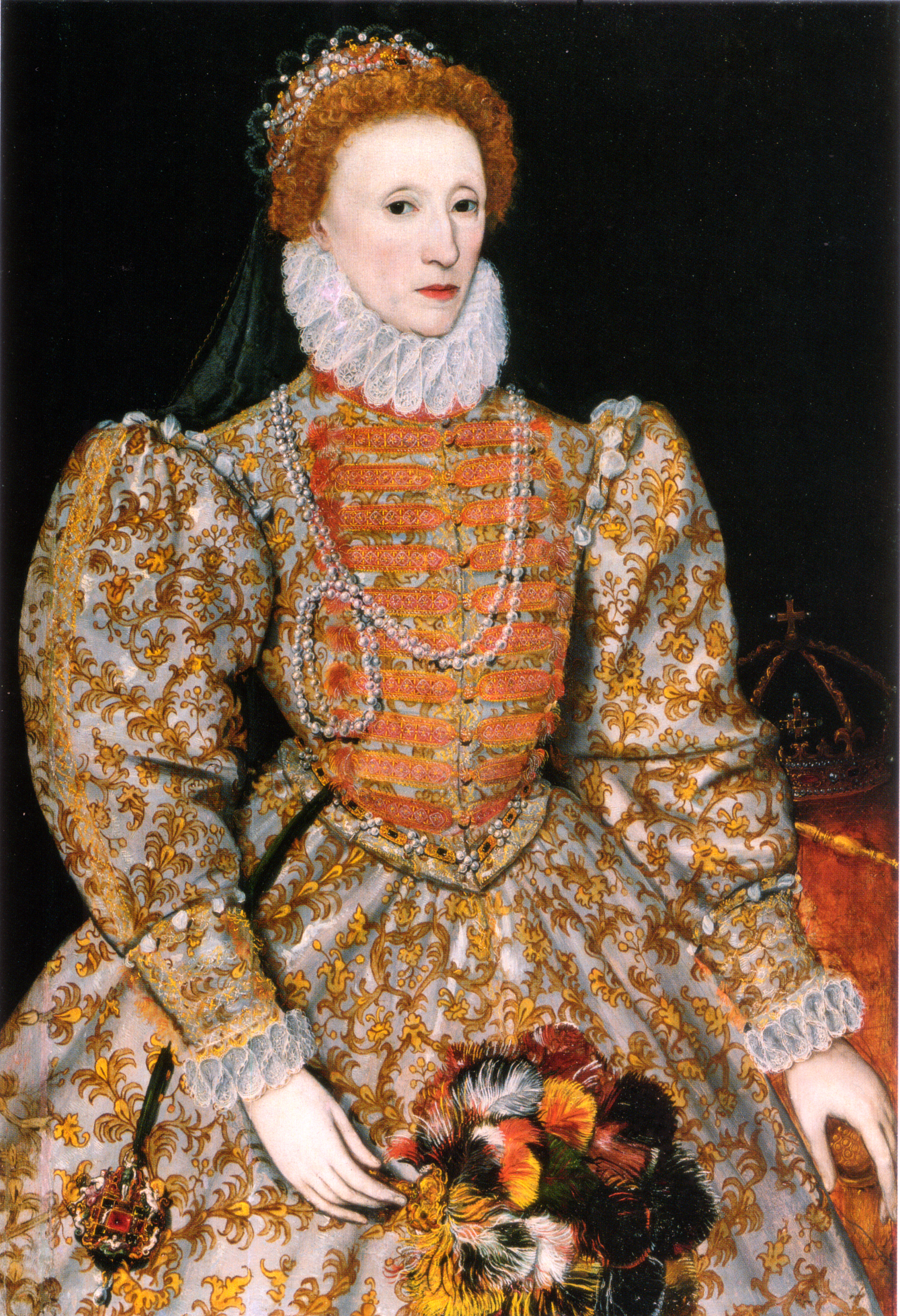
Queen Elizabeth I of England reached a moderate religious settlement.

Elizabeth I inherited a kingdom in which a majority of people, especially the political elite, were religiously conservative, and England's main ally was Catholic Spain. For these reasons, the proclamation announcing her accession forbade any "breach, alteration, or change of any order or usage presently established within this our realm". This was only temporary. The new Queen was Protestant, though a conservative one. She also filled her new government with Protestants. The Queen's principal secretary was Sir William Cecil, a moderate Protestant. Her Privy Council was filled with former Edwardian politicians, and only Protestants preached at Court.

In 1558, Parliament passed the Act of Supremacy, which re-established the Church of England's independence from Rome and conferred on Elizabeth the title of Supreme Governor of the Church of England. The Act of Uniformity of 1559 authorised the 1559 Book of Common Prayer, which was a revised version of the 1552 Prayer Book from Edward's reign. Some modifications were made to appeal to Catholics and Lutherans, including giving individuals greater latitude concerning belief in the real presence and authorising the use of traditional priestly vestments. In 1571, the Thirty-Nine Articles were adopted as a confessional statement for the church, and a Book of Homilies was issued outlining the church's reformed theology in greater detail.

The Elizabethan Settlement established a church that was Reformed in doctrine but that preserved certain characteristics of medieval Catholicism, such as cathedrals, church choirs, a formal liturgy contained in the Prayer Book, traditional vestments and episcopal polity. According to historian Diarmaid MacCulloch, the conflicts over the Elizabethan Settlement stem from this "tension between Catholic structure and Protestant theology".

"Church papists" were Catholics who outwardly conformed to the established church while maintaining their Catholic faith in secret. Catholic authorities disapproved of such outward conformity. Recusants were Catholics who refused to attend Church of England services as required by law. Recusancy was punishable by fines of £20 a month (fifty times an artisan's wage). By 1574, Catholic recusants had organised an underground Catholic Church, distinct from the Church of England. However, it had two major weaknesses: membership loss as church papists conformed fully to the Church of England, at least outwardly, and a shortage of priests. Between 1574 and 1603, 600 Catholic priests were sent to England. The influx of foreign trained Catholic priests, the unsuccessful Revolt of the Northern Earls, the excommunication of Elizabeth, and the discovery of the Ridolfi plot all contributed to a perception that Catholicism was treasonous. Executions of Catholic priests became more common—the first in 1577, four in 1581, eleven in 1582, two in 1583, six in 1584, fifty-three by 1590, and seventy more between 1601 and 1608. (Note: Haigh 1993, pp. 262f: "...England judicially murdered more Catholics than any other country in Europe.") In 1585, it became treason for a Catholic priest to enter the country, as well as for anyone to aid or shelter him. As the older generation of recusant priests died out, Catholicism collapsed among the lower classes in the north, west and in Wales. Without priests, these social classes drifted into the Church of England and Catholicism was forgotten. By Elizabeth's death in 1603, Catholicism had become "the faith of a small sect", largely confined to gentry households.

Gradually, England was transformed into a Protestant country as the Prayer Book shaped Elizabethan religious life. By the 1580s, conformist Protestants (those who conformed their religious practice to the religious settlement) were becoming a majority. Calvinism appealed to many conformists, and Calvinist clergy held the best bishoprics and deaneries during Elizabeth's reign. Other Calvinists were unsatisfied with elements of the Elizabethan Settlement and wanted further reforms to make the Church of England more like the Continental Reformed churches. These nonconformist Calvinists became known as Puritans. Some Puritans refused to bow at the name of Jesus, to make the sign of the cross in baptism, use wedding rings or organ music in church. They especially resented the requirement that clergy wear the white surplice and clerical cap. Puritan clergymen preferred to wear black academic attire (see Vestments controversy). Many Puritans believed the Church of England should follow the example of Reformed churches in other parts of Europe and adopt presbyterian polity, under which government by bishops would be replaced with government by elders. However, all attempts to enact further reforms through Parliament were blocked by the Queen.

== Consequences ==
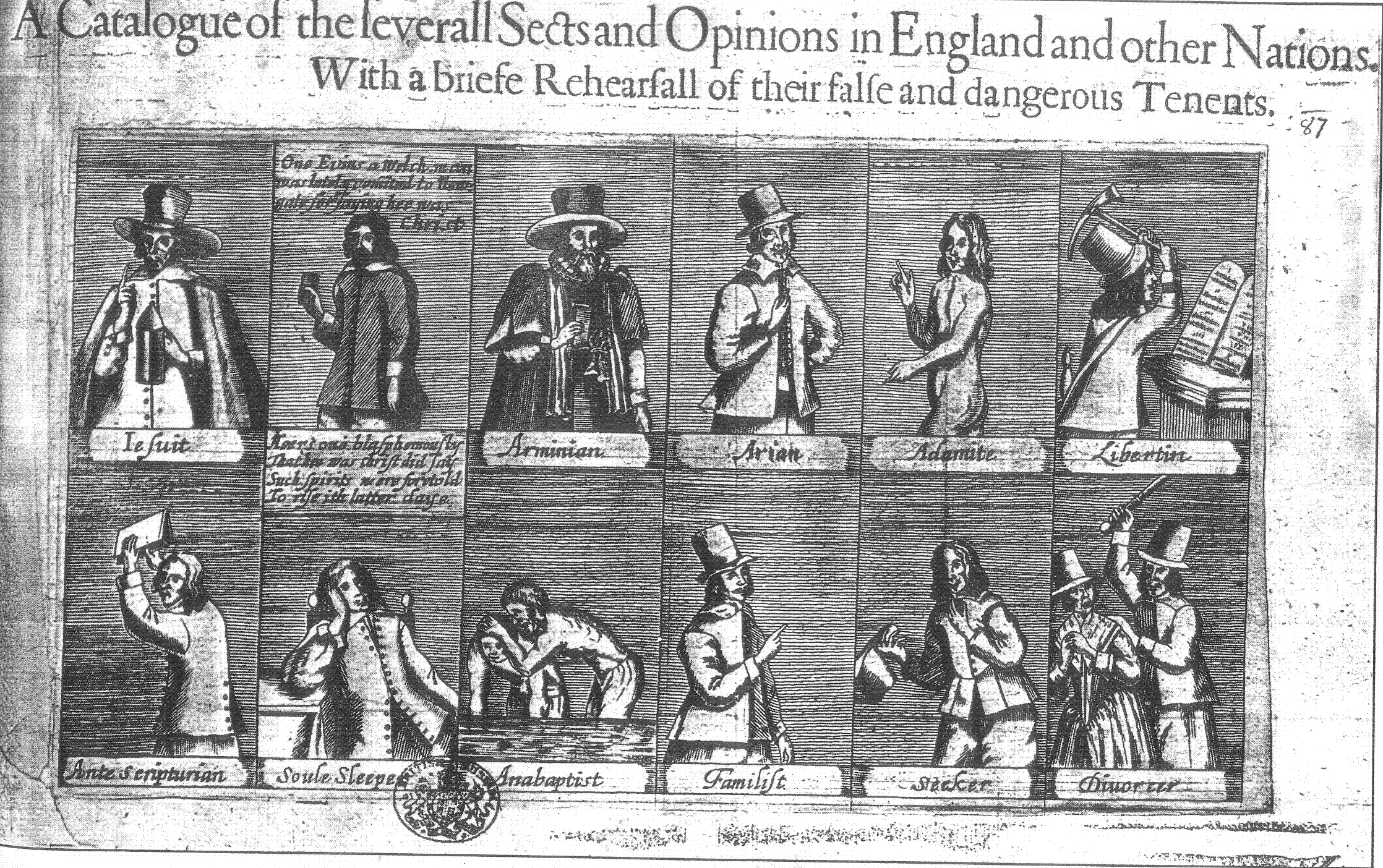
Polemical popular print with a Catalogue of Sects, 1647

Traditionally, historians have dated the end of the English Reformation to Elizabeth's religious settlement. There are scholars who advocate for a "Long Reformation" that continued into the 17th and 18th centuries.

During the early Stuart period, the Church of England's dominant theology was still Calvinism, but a group of theologians associated with Bishop Lancelot Andrewes disagreed with many aspects of the Reformed tradition, especially its teaching on predestination. They looked to the Church Fathers rather than the Reformers and preferred using the more traditional 1549 Prayer Book. Due to their belief in free will, this new faction is known as the Arminian party, but their high church orientation was more controversial. James I tried to balance the Puritan forces within his church with followers of Andrewes, promoting many of them at the end of his reign.

During the reign of Charles I, the Arminians were ascendant and closely associated with William Laud, Archbishop of Canterbury (1633–1645). Laud and his followers believed the Reformation had gone too far and launched a "'Beauty of Holiness' counter-revolution, wishing to restore what they saw as lost majesty in worship and lost dignity for the sacerdotal priesthood". Laudianism, however, was unpopular with both Puritans and Prayer Book conformists, who viewed the high church innovations as undermining forms of worship they had grown attached to. The English Civil War resulted in the overthrow of Charles I, and a Puritan-dominated Parliament began to dismantle the Elizabethan Settlement. The Puritans, however, were divided among themselves and failed to agree on an alternative religious settlement. A variety of new religious movements appeared, including Quakers, Ranters, Seekers, Diggers, Muggletonians, and Fifth Monarchists.

The Restoration of the monarchy in 1660 allowed for the restoration of the Elizabethan Settlement as well, but the Church of England was fundamentally changed. The "Jacobean consensus" was shattered. Many Puritans were unwilling to conform and became dissenters. Now outside the established church, the different strands of the Puritan movement evolved into separate denominations: Congregationalists, Presbyterians, and Baptists.

After the Restoration, Anglicanism took shape as a recognisable tradition. From Richard Hooker, Anglicanism inherited a belief in the "positive spiritual value in ceremonies and rituals, and for an unbroken line of succession from the medieval Church to the latter day Church of England". From the Arminians, it gained a theology of episcopacy and an appreciation for liturgy. From the Puritans and Calvinists, it "inherited a contradictory impulse to assert the supremacy of scripture and preaching".

The new religion was not enthusiastically adopted in all locations for several centuries: Cornish philologist Henry Jenner noted that "the Cornish as a body...(remained)...more or less of the old religion, until the perhaps unavoidable neglect of its authorities caused it to drift into the outward irreligion from which John Wesley rescued them. ...the bulk of the population in Cornwall, as elsewhere, had no desire for the Reformed Service-book in any language."

The religious forces unleashed by the Reformation ultimately destroyed the possibility of religious uniformity. Protestant dissenters were allowed freedom of worship with the Toleration Act 1688. It took Catholics longer to achieve toleration. Penal laws that excluded Catholics from everyday life began to be repealed in the 1770s. Catholics were allowed to vote and sit as members of Parliament in 1829 (see Catholic emancipation).

== Historiography ==
Reformation historiography has seen many schools of interpretation with Catholic, Anglican and Nonconformist historians using their own religious perspectives.

Recent schools of interpretation include the Whig, the neo-Marxist, the political (associated with Geoffrey Elton), the religious perspective (associated with A. G. Dickens and others), the revisionist school (associated with Christopher Haigh, Jack Scarisbrick, Eamon Duffy and other scholars, initially often Catholic), and the Puritan factional focus (associated with Patrick Collinson and others).

== See also ==
- Anti-Catholicism
- Christianity in Wales
- Gunpowder Plot
- History of the Church of England
- History of England
- Putting away of Books and Images Act 1549
- Popery
- Reformation in Ireland
- Religion in England
- Scottish Reformation
