= Confessionalization =

Process during the Protestant Reformation

In Protestant Reformation history, confessionalization is the parallel processes of "confession-building" taking place in Europe between the Peace of Augsburg (1555) and the Thirty Years' War (1618–1648). For most of this time, there was a nominal peace in the Holy Roman Empire between the Protestant and Catholic confessions as both competed to establish their faith more firmly with the population of their respective areas. This confession-building occurred through "social-disciplining," as there was a stricter enforcement by the churches of their particular rules for all aspects of life in both Protestant and Catholic areas. This had the consequence of creating distinctive confessional identities that influenced church dogma, faith formation, liturgy, and the development of universities.

The German historian Ernst Walter Zeeden first described the phenomenon of 'confession building' (Konfessionsbildung) in the 1950s. In the 1970s, Wolfgang Reinhard and Heinz Schilling further developed these ideas in parallel, applying their ideas to church-state formation in Roman Catholic and Lutheran contexts in the Holy Roman Empire.

Calvin's Geneva is also a model case for the confessional era because of its high degree of social control, unity and homogeneity under one expression of a reformed Christian faith. The Genevan model was informed by an interpretation of Erasmus' humanism. The reformation had shown the independent character of northern Europe to resist acceptance to Catholic orthodoxy and thus called for an end to the Corpus Christianum. The new model sought to establish a decentralized Christian community, rooted in the belief that one's own interpretative theology was correct and sufficient.

Confessionalization was supported by monarchs and rulers in general, because after the Reformation had brought control over their territories' churches into their hands, they could exercise more power over their subjects by enforcing strict religious obedience. The main tool for the enforcement of these rules were "police-regulations". These were behavior codes for religious, social and economic life to which the common citizen had to oblige under threat of severe punishment.

Increasingly, the secular governments (sometimes in cooperation or conflict with the churches they controlled) provided material relief for the poor and needy, and in return the state demanded obedience and increased taxes from its subjects. Thus, confessionalization is often described as a developmental stage towards both the absolutist states of the 17th and 18th centuries, as well as the modern welfare state.

Nancy Shields Kollmann used the term "confessionalization" to refer to the religious arbitration and control used in the Russian Empire to manage the activity of non-Orthodox religions such as Catholicism, Lutheranism, Islam, Judaism, and Buddhism. Tsarist Russia, a multi-confessional empire with one state religion, banned the proselytization of other faiths to Orthodox Christians. However, the tsarist administration supported centralizing institutions within other religions (such as the Orenburg Assembly) insofar as they would aid in local administration and were allied with the state.

The concept of the Long Reformation, developed largely in English historiography, parallels confessionalization in highlighting the protracted and multifaceted nature of religious change, though it has been applied chiefly to England rather than to continental Europe.

== Bibliography ==
- "Confessionalization forum". H-German. 2005. Archived from the original on July 16, 2012.
- Berentsen, William (1998). "Lutheran church organization and confessionalization". Britannica Online.
- Confessionalization: Reformation, Religion, Absolutism, and Modernity
- Headley, John M. and Hans J. Hillerbrand, eds. (2004). Confessionalization in Europe, 1555–1700: Essays in Honor and Memory of Bodo Nischan. Farnham, Eng: Ashgate.
- Hsia, R. Po-chia (1991). Social discipline in the Reformation : Central Europe 1550–1750 (Paperback ed.). London: Routledge. ISBN 0-415-01149-3.
- Reinhard, Wolfgang (1989). Reformation, Counter-Reformation, and Confessionalization. Oxford: Oxford University Press.
- Rüdiger Grimkowski: Habsburgische Konfessionalisierung und die Josephsverehrung. In: Zeitschrift für Geschichtswissenschaft. 52. Jahrgang, Heft 11, 2004, ISSN 044-2828, S. 981–994.
- Rüdiger Grimkowski: Michael Willmann. Barockmaler im Dienst der katholischen Konfessionalisierung. Der Grüssauer Josephszyklus. Berlin 2005, ISBN 978-3-89998-050-9.
- Marshall, Peter (February 2012). "THE NAMING OF PROTESTANT ENGLAND". Past & Present (214). Oxford University Press: 87–128.
- Schilling, Heinz (1992). Religion, Political Culture and the Emergence of Early Modern Society: Essays in German and Dutch History. Leiden: Brill.
