= Ernst Walter Zeeden =

German historian

- Born: May 14, 1916; Berlin
- Died: September 5, 2011 (aged 95)
- Resting place: Bergfriedhof, Tübingen
- Education: Leipzig University; Heidelberg University; Ludwig-Maximilians-Universität München; University of Freiburg
- Known for: Entstehung der Konfessionen; Martin Luther; Hegemonialkriege und Glaubenskämpfe
- Spouse: Marianne Zeeden
- Children: 5
- Scientific career
- Fields: History of the Middle Ages; Modern history
- Thesis: Hardenberg und der Gedanke einer Volksvertretung in Preußen 1807–1812 (1939)
- Doctoral advisor: Gerhard Ritter
- Notable students: Johannes Burkhardt; Helga Schnabel-Schüle; Wolfram Siemann

Ernst Walter Zeeden (14 May 1916 in Berlin – 5 September 2011) was a German medievalist and a scholar of modern history.

== Life ==
Ernst Walter Zeeden was born in Berlin as the son of regional court director Konrad Zeeden (1879–1925) and his wife Marianne. After he earned the Abitur at the Goethe-Gymnasium in Berlin, he studied history, German and Latin at Leipzig University, Heidelberg University, the Ludwig-Maximilians-Universität München and the University of Freiburg. In Leipzig, he was a member of student organisation Corps Saxonia Leipzig. In 1939, he obtained a doctor's degree (Dr. phil.) with his thesis Hardenberg und der Gedanke einer Volksvertretung in Preußen 1807–1812 under the supervision of Gerhard Ritter. On November 4, 1948, he married Pauline Dubbert in Freiburg. They had five children.

Zeeden was habilitated at the University of Freiburg in 1947 and became an associate professor there in 1954. In 1957, he was called to the University of Tübingen. He became an Emeritus in 1984. Even though he originated from a Protestant family, Zeeden converted to Roman Catholicism and joined the Order of the Holy Sepulchre in Freiburg on May 9, 1954. His wife and his sister remained Protestant.

Zeeden was buried at the Bergfriedhof in Tübingen.

== Career ==
In Tübingen, Zeeden took part to the foundation of the first Collaborative Research Centres for Geisteswissenschaften (lit. 'sciences of mind') of the German Research Foundation (DFG). The Center was co-founded with historians Josef Engel and Heiko Oberman, and its activity focused on the history of the Late Middle Ages and the Reformation.

In his life, Zeeden wrote about the Reformation and Confessionalization era. His research lead to a re-assessment of that period by German and European historians. His writings, his overall approach of all confessions, as well as his thesis about the Catholic traditions in 17th and 18th-century Lutheranism were well-received abroad.

Zeeden opened new research fields with his books about the emergence of confessions (Entstehung der Konfessionen), Martin Luther and the "Hegemonial Wars and Confession Struggles" (Hegemonialkriege und Glaubenskämpfe) of the series Propyläen-Geschichte Europas.

Zeeden's scientific legacy is preserved by the Ulm City Archive, where it spans over a 11-meter-long library sector.

Moreover, Zeeden supervised 70 new doctorate theses and educated ten university professors, including Johannes Burkhardt, Helga Schnabel-Schüle and Wolfram Siemann. He was himself a student of Gerhard Ritter and a relative of Max Weber.

== Selected works ==
- Hardenberg und der Gedanke einer Volksvertretung in Preußen 1807–1812. Berlin: Ebering, 1940 (also: phil. dissertation, University of Freiburg, 1939).
- Martin Luther und die Reformation im Urteil des deutschen Luthertums. 2 vol., Freiburg: Herder, 1950–52.
- Katholische Überlieferungen in den lutherischen Kirchenordnungen des 16. Jahrhunderts. Münster: Aschendorff, 1959.
- Die Entstehung der Konfessionen. München: Oldenbourg, 1965.
- Das Zeitalter der Glaubenskämpfe. München: Deutscher Taschenbuch-Verlag, 1973 (pocket edition of the 9th edition of Gebhardt. Handbuch der deutschen Geschichte.
- Propyläen-Geschichte Europas. vol. 2: Hegemonialkriege und Glaubenskämpfe, Berlin: Propyläen Verlag, 1977, ISBN 3-549-15792-4.
- Europa im Zeitalter des Absolutismus und der Aufklärung. Stuttgart: Klett-Cotta, 1981, ISBN 3-12-915660-7.
- Europa im Umbruch. Von 1776 bis zum Wiener Kongress. Stuttgart: Klett-Cotta, 1982, ISBN 3-12-915670-4.
- Konfessionsbildung. Studien zur Reformation, Gegenreformation und katholischen Reform. Stuttgart: Klett-Cotta, 1985, ISBN 978-3-608-91166-4.

== Bibliography ==
- Horst Rabe, ed. (1976). Festgabe für Ernst Walter Zeeden. Zum 60. Geburtstag am 14. Mai 1976 (in German). Münster: Aschendorff. ISBN 3-402-03759-9.
- Markus Gerstmeier; Anton Schindling, eds. (2016). Ernst Walter Zeeden (1916–2011) als Historiker der Reformation, Konfessionsbildung und "Deutscher Kultur". Relektüren eines geschichtswissenschaftlichen Vordenkers. Katholisches Leben und Kirchenreform im Zeitalter der Glaubensspaltung. (in German). Vol. 76. Münster: Aschendorff. ISBN 978-3-402-11095-9.
