= Life (UK organisation) =

Pregnancy charity and anti-abortion organisation

- Type: Charitable organisation
- Founded: 1970; 56 years ago
- Founder: Jack Scarisbrick; Nuala Scarisbrick
- Headquarters: Tancred Close, Leamington Spa, United Kingdom
- Website: lifecharity.org.uk

Life is an anti-abortion organization and maternal support charity based in the United Kingdom. The charity was founded in 1970 by husband and wife Jack and Nuala Scarisbrick. Catholics and evangelicals form the majority of Life's membership and support. For the year ended June 2021 the charity had a turnover of £3.4 million.

== History ==
The charity was founded by Jack and Nuala Scarisbrick in August 1970 in response to the passage of the Abortion Act 1967, which legalised abortion in the United Kingdom. Life has stated its mission is to "not give up until those facing difficult pregnancies can choose life and abortion is a thing of the past"; the National Catholic Register described it as a group "dedicated to the removal of the Abortion Act from the country’s statute books".

Initially run out of their family home in Leamington Spa, Warwickshire, the Scarisbricks hosted expectant mothers who were waiting to enter the local maternity hospital. Life later expanded, establishing hospices, crisis pregnancy centres, and accommodations for single mothers in the rest of the country.

In 2016, the charity launched a marketing campaign called "Ignite", expanding its online presence and rebranding its website (which it called a "re-birth") in an attempt to counter abortion-rights service providers, such as the British Pregnancy Advisory Service and Marie Stopes International. In an announcement for the campaign, Life said, "Our new strategy will meet these women where they’re at – making contact with the girl who’s about to book an abortion with one click on her smartphone", aiming to stop women from getting on "the abortion provider’s conveyor belt".

Nuala Scarisbrick was national administrator of Life until 2017, when she stepped down due to the onset of Alzheimer's disease. Her husband, Jack, also stepped down as chairman of Life that year.

== Activities ==
Life offers counselling and support on pregnancy and pregnancy loss, practical support for pregnant women experiencing homelessness, and education on abortion and other pregnancy-related topics. The charity's flagship activities include a national advice hotline and a series of shelters for young expectant mothers.

Life opposes abortion and has lobbied against the practice in the United Kingdom, including by giving talks in schools. Co-founder Nuala Scarisbrick was quoted as saying that political opposition to abortion must always be accompanied by "real, meaningful support to women in crisis pregnancies". Life has also opposed experimentation based on the cloning of embryos.

In accordance with its charitable status, Life does not undertake political campaigning in its own right. Nevertheless, the organisation has been associated with the Alive and Kicking campaign, an umbrella group of anti-abortion organisations, and the Care Not Killing alliance, a coalition of anti-euthanasia campaigners from many different backgrounds, including anti-abortion organisations, parliamentarians, medical professionals, and religious groups.

== Criticism ==
In 2011, the Life telephone advice line and some Life Care Centres were criticised for providing inaccurate information about abortion, and for using emotive language. In response to the story, Life said that it had reviewed many of its procedures and protocols. Also in 2011 the Conservative government caused controversy when it appointed Life, which stated that its services included counselling and information on pregnancy and adoption, to its advisory group the Sexual Health Forum, replacing the British Pregnancy Advisory Service (BPAS). Ann Furedi, the chief executive of BPAS, said: "We find it puzzling that the Department of Health would want a group that is opposed to abortion and provides no sexual health services on its sexual health forum." The Liberal Democrat's Evan Harris opposed the organisation's inclusion on the forum.

Life was, along with other anti-abortion groups, mentioned in the 2014 Brook report into crisis pregnancy centres. The report found that some of these centres had spread misinformation about abortion and "attempted to emotionally manipulate vulnerable women"; Life, specifically, had falsely linked abortion to breast cancer, mental health problems, and an increased risk of suicide. Later that year, the Oxford University Student Union banned the charity from advertising its services at Oxford University following a complaint that gave misleading advice on abortion.

Life made headlines in 2017 for receiving taxpayer funding from the newly introduced tampon tax in the United Kingdom, with campaigners arguing that taxpayers should not be subsidizing anti-abortion organizations.

In 2019 Life expressed opposition to the Royal College of General Practitioners decision to support the decriminalisation of abortion.
