= Heinz Schilling =

German historian (born 1942)

Heinz Schilling (born 23 May 1942) is a German historian.

== Life ==
Heinz Schilling was born in Bergneustadt in Berg and grew up in Cologne. After studying history, German, philosophy and sociology at the University of Cologne and completing a state teaching certification, Schilling moved on to take a doctorate in 1971 at the University of Freiburg with a study of social and religious history of Dutch exiles, working with Gottfried Schramm. From 1971 to 1979 Schilling worked as an assistant and lecturer at the department of medieval history and then in early modern history at the newly founded Faculty of History at Bielefeld University. He completed his Habilitation there in 1977/78 with a case study of territorial societal history and "Confessionalization" (committee members Wolfgang Mager, Reinhart Koselleck and Bernd Moeller). From 1979 to 1982 he was professor of early modern history at the University of Osnabrück and from 1982 to 1992 professor at the University of Giessen. In 1992 he was appointed to the newly established chair of early modern European history as part of the foundation of the Institute of Historical Studies (Instituts für Geschichtswissenschaften) at the Humboldt University of Berlin, which he held until his retirement at the end of the 2010 summer semester.

== Research interests ==
- the comparative history of Europe in the early modern period
- the international system
- the political and cultural origins of national identity in Europe
- the history of the Holy Roman Empire and its constituent territories
- immigration and minorities in old Europe (Germany, England, the Netherlands)
- cities and bourgeois life in the early modern period and the transition to the modern world
- the history of political theory
- the Reformation and European Confessionalization
- the social and cultural history of Calvinism from the 16th to the 19th centuries
- the early modern modernization of Germany and the Netherlands
- historical exhibits in museums

== Memberships and honors (selected) ==
- since 1996 member of the Berlin-Brandenburg Academy of Sciences
- 1998/99 chair of the scholarly committee for the European exhibition "1648 – Krieg und Frieden in Europa“, Münster/Osnabrück
- since 2001 chair of the Vereins für Reformationsgeschichte (Society for Reformation Research—German branch)
- 2002 Dr A. H. Heineken Prize for History of the Royal Netherlands Academy of Arts and Sciences
- 2003/04 fellow of the Netherlands Institute for Advanced Study (NIAS)
- 2004 foreign member of the Royal Netherlands Academy of Arts and Sciences
- 2004/05 fellow of the Historisches Kolleg, Munich
- since 2004 corresponding member of the British Academy
- since 2005 member of the Academia Europaea
- 2006 12th Stern Lecture Series of the Historical Society of Israel, May 9–16, 2006, Jerusalem
- 2009 honorary doctorate (Dr. theol. honoris causa) from the Theology Faculty of the University of Göttingen

== Selected works ==
Books

- Niederländische Exulanten im 16. Jahrhundert. Ihre Stellung im Sozialgefüge und im religiösen Leben deutscher und englischer Städte, Gütersloh, 1972
- Konfessionskonflikt und Staatsbildung. Eine Fallstudie über das Verhältnis von religiösem und sozialem Wandel in der Frühneuzeit am Beispiel der Grafschaft Lippe, Gütersloh: G. Mohn, 1981, = Quellen und Forschungen zur Reformationsgeschichte, hg. im Auftrag des Vereins für Reformationsgeschichte von G.A. Benrath, Bd. 48
- Mitten in Europa - Deutsche Geschichte (with H. Boockmann, H. Schulze, M. Stürmer), Berlin, 1984; reprinted.
- Bürgerliche Eliten in den Niederlanden und in Nordwestdeutschland. Studien zur Sozialgeschichte des europäischen Bürgertums im Mittelalter und in der Neuzeit, Cologne/Vienna: Böhlau, 1985, = Städteforschung, Reihe A, Bd. 23 ed. with H. Diederiks)
- Aufbruch und Krise. Deutsche Geschichte von 1517 bis 1648, Berlin: Siedler, 1988
- Höfe und Allianzen. Deutsche Geschichte von 1648 bis 1763, Berlin: Siedler, 1989
- Religion, Political Culture and the Emergence of Early Modern Society. Leiden: Brill 1992
- Die neue Zeit: Vom Christenheitseuropa zum Europa der Staaten, 1250 bis 1750, Siedler, 1999
- "1648 - Krieg und Frieden in Europa“, Europaratsausstellung zum 350. Jahrestag des Westfälischen Friedens, 3 vols., ed. with K. Bußmann, Munich, 1998
- Die neue Zeit. Vom Christenheitseuropa zum Europa der Staaten. 1250 bis 1750 (= Siedler Geschichte Europas, vol. 3). Berlin, 1999
- "La confessionalisation et le système international", in: Lucien Bély (Hg.): „L’Europe des traités de Westphalie. Esprit de la diplomatie et diplomatie de l’esprit“, Paris (Presses Universitaires de France) 2000, pp. 411–428
- Ausgewählte Abhandlungen zur europäischen Reformations- und Konfessionsgeschichte, Berlin: Duncker und Humblot, 2002
- Europa in der werdenden Neuzeit – oder: Was heißt und zu welchem Ende studiert man europäische Geschichte?, in: Royal Netherlands Academy of Arts and Sciences. Heineken Lectures 2002, Amsterdam 2003, pp. 62–81
- Das Reich als Verteidigungs- und Friedensorganisation, in: Altes Reich und Neue Staaten, 1495-1806. 29. Ausstellung des Europarates in Berlin und Magdeburg im Deutschen Historischen Museum, Berlin, 28. August bis 10. Dezember 2006, Band 2, Dresden (ISBN 3-937602-67-4)
- Konfessioneller Fundamentalismus. Religion als politischer Faktor im europäischen Mächtesystem um 1600 (= Schriften des Historischen Kollegs, Bd. 70), ed. Heinz Schilling with the assistance of Elisabeth Müller-Luckner, Munich, 2007
- Konfessionalisierung und Staatsinteressen. Internationale Beziehungen 1559 - 1660, Handbuch der Geschichte der internationalen Beziehungen (Band 2), Paderborn, 2007 (ISBN 978-3-506-73722-9 oder ISBN 3-506-73722-8)
- Early modern European Civilisation and its political and cultural dynamics, The Menahem Stern Jerusalem Lectures 2006. Hannover und London, 2008
- Konfesjonalizacja – Kosciól i panstwo w Europie doby przednowoczesnej, Poznan, 2010
- Martin Luther: Rebell in einer Zeit des Umbruchs, München, 2013 (English translation: Martin Luther: Rebel in an Age of Upheaval, Oxford University press, 2017)

Collected essays

- Civic Calvinism in Northwestern Germany and the Netherlands, Sixteenth to Nineteenth Centuries, Kirksville/Mo (SCJ Publishers)1991, = Sixteenth Century Essays and Studies, Bd. 17
- Religion, Political Culture, and the Emergence of Early Modern Society, Essays in German and Dutch History, Leiden (E. J. Brill) 1992
- Die Stadt in der Frühen Neuzeit, München 1993, = Enzyklopädie Deutscher Geschichte, Bd. 24., 2. Auflage München 2004
- Ausgewählte Abhandlungen zur europäischen Reformations- und Konfessionsgeschichte, hg. v. Luise Schorn-Schütte und Olaf Mörke, = Historische Forschungen, Bd. 75, Berlin (Duncker &Humblot,) 2002
