= Christopher Haigh =

British historian (born 1944)

Christopher Haigh FRHistS
- Born: 28 August 1944 (age 82); Birkenhead, Merseyside, England
- Occupations: Historian and academic
- Spouse: Alison Wall
- Children: 2

Academic background
- Education: Churchill College, Cambridge; Victoria University of Manchester
- Influences: Geoffrey Elton

Academic work
- Discipline: History
- Sub-discipline: Early modern Britain; English Reformation; Political history; Elizabethan era
- Institutions: University of Manchester; Christ Church, Oxford

Christopher A. Haigh FRHistS (born 28 August 1944) is a British historian specialising in religion and politics around the English Reformation. Until his retirement in 2009, he was Student and Tutor in Modern History at Christ Church, Oxford and University Lecturer at Oxford University. He was educated at Churchill College, Cambridge and the Victoria University of Manchester. Haigh was a very influential revisionist in Tudor historiography and on the English Reformation. Haigh's writings mostly demonstrated that, contrary to orthodox understandings of the English Reformation, religious reform was extremely complex and varied considerably at a parish level. Haigh has also been noted for his work in diminishing the significance attributed to anticlericalism prior to 1530. His revisionism formed part of a broader wave in Tudor historiography with other historians such as Eamon Duffy and also formed the basis for the theory of the long reformation.

== Personal life ==
Haigh is married to fellow historian Alison Wall.

== Works ==
- Reformation and Resistance in Tudor Lancashire, Cambridge University Press, 1975
- The English Reformation Revised, Cambridge University Press, 1987
- English Reformations: Religion, Politics and Society under the Tudors, Oxford University Press, 1993
- Politics in an Age of Peace and War, 1570-1630 in The Oxford Illustrated History of Tudor and Stuart Britain, Oxford, 1996, pp. 330–360
- Elizabeth I, London, 1988
- Success and Failure in the English Reformation, Past & Present. Vol 173 (1) (2001) pp. 28–49
- The Troubles of Thomas Pestell: Parish Squabbles and Ecclesiastical Politics in Caroline England, Journal of British Studies. Vol 41 (2002) pp. 403–428
- The Reformation in England to 1603 in The Blackwell Companion to the Reformation, Oxford, 2003
- Clergy JPs in England and Wales, 1590-1640, The Historical Journal, vol 47, 2004, pp. 233–259
- The Character of an Antipuritan, Sixteenth Century Journal, vol XXXV, 2004, pp. 671–88
- A G Dickens and the English Reformation, Historical Research, vol 77, 2004, pp. 24–38
- The Plain Man's Pathways to Heaven: Kinds of Christianity in Post-Reformation England, 1570-1640, Oxford University Press, 2007
