= Zoe's Place Baby Hospice =

British charitable organization

Zoe’s Place Trust
- Formation: 1995
- Registration no.: 1092545 (England and Wales)
- Headquarters: Royal Leamington Spa, Warwickshire
- Region served: North West England, North East England, Midlands
- Services: Care and treatment for children with life-limiting conditions and complex needs
- Chair: Alan Schofield
- Revenue: £4.3 million (2023)
- Staff: 122 (2023)
- Website: https://www.zoes-place.org.uk

Zoe's Place Baby Hospice, operating as Zoe’s Place Trust, is a United Kingdom based registered charity founded by Professor Jack Scarisbrick in 1995. It provides palliative and respite care for very or terminally ill babies and children up to five years old.

== History ==
Zoe's Place was founded in 1995 by historian Professor Jack Scarisbrick, with its first children's hospice opening up in Liverpool. It was established in response to a recognition of the lack of suitable options for babies and young children needing specialist care, and the unmet needs of families and parents of children with life-limiting conditions.

After establishing its first care facility in Liverpool, Zoe's Place opened up two additional hospices within Middlesbrough and Coventry, in 2004 and 2011, respectively.

== Services ==
Zoe's Place provides specialist respite care and support for babies and children up to five years old with life-limiting conditions and complex needs, and their parents and families within the North West, North East, and the Midlands.

Its services include short breaks for children, day care, sibling support, therapies for children, support into children's services after the age of five, end of life care, and care after death. The holistic nature of services and support to patients and families has been recognised as an important part of its offering by the independent care quality regulator, the Care Quality Commission.

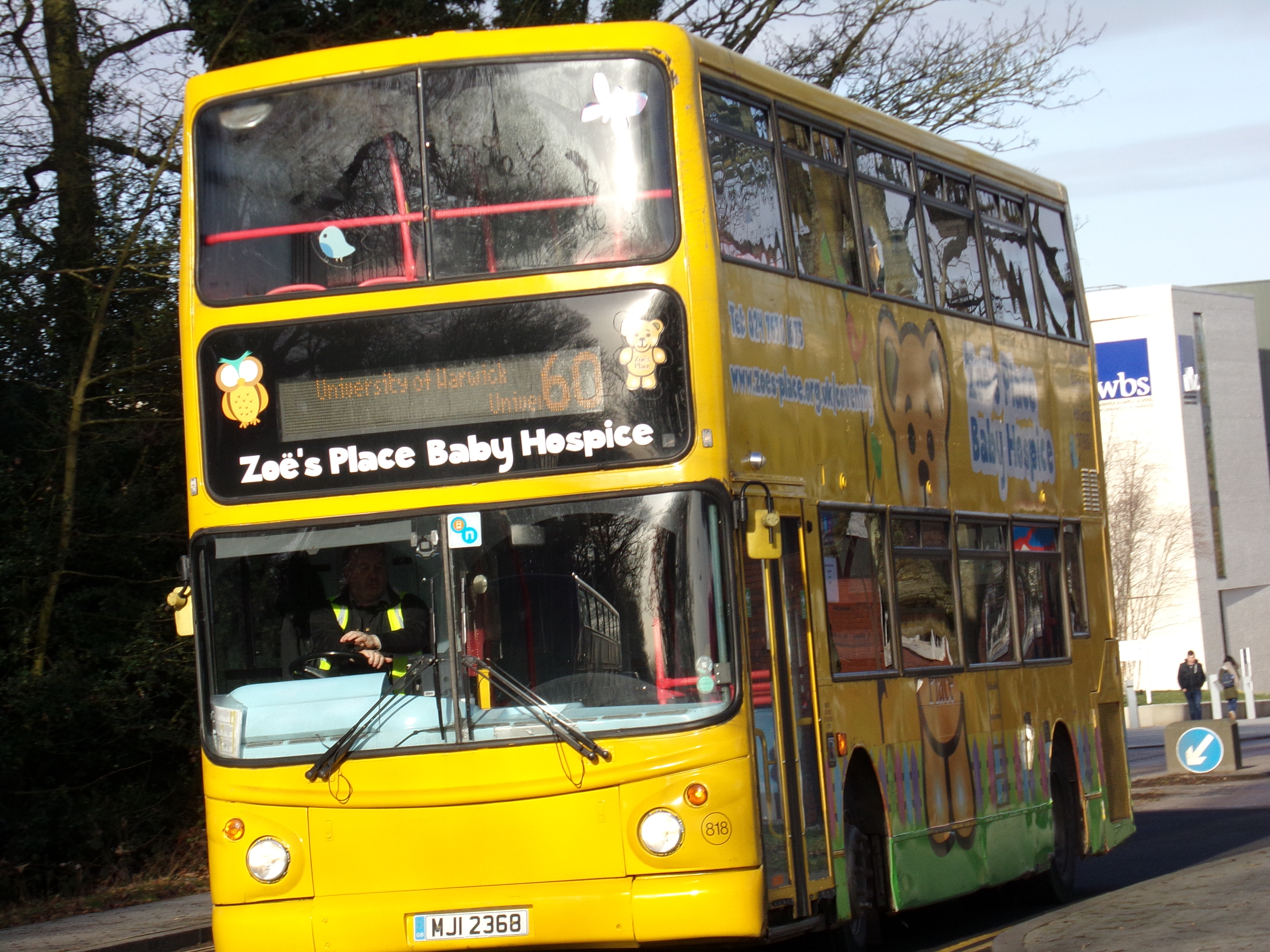
Bus wrapped in advertising livery as part of fundraising efforts for Zoe's Place

== Fundraising and profile ==
Patrons of the charity include multi-gold medal paralympic athlete Tanni Grey-Thompson, football manager Joe Royle and comedian Patrick Monahan.

For the 2017–18 season, then Coventry-based English Premier League rugby club Wasps made Zoe's Place one of their key charity partners to try and raise money to run six beds out of the local hostel rather than four.

During the 2024-2025 Competition of the FA Cup, Coventry City unveiled a special 4th kit for their tie against Ipswich Town Football Club, where Coventry City will be making a donation from the profits to both Zoë’s Place Baby Hospice and Sky Blues in the Community.
