= Nuala Scarisbrick =

British anti-abortion activist (1939–2021)

Nuala Ann Scarisbrick (18 January 1939 – 31 August 2021), was co-founder in 1970, with her husband Jack Scarisbrick, and National Administrator of Life, a British anti-abortion charity.

== Early life ==
She was the eldest of the three children of Thomas Izod, a civil servant, and Ann O'Dwyer, a nurse, who lived in Ewell, Surrey; she was born at St Thomas' Hospital, London. She attended Rosebery Grammar School for Girls in Epsom, Surrey, before studying English at University College London. After university she was employed as a brand manager by Unilever and then as a teacher in Reigate.

She was married in 1965 to John Joseph 'Jack' Scarisbrick, a Tudor historian, who was then teaching at Queen Mary College. She became a Catholic and they had two daughters, moving to Leamington Spa in 1970 where her husband had been appointed professor of history at the University of Warwick.

== Founder of Life charity ==
In response to the 1967 Abortion Act in August 1970 she and her husband co-founded Life, which went on to become one of the most effective and successful anti-abortion activist groups. They both held strong opinions about respecting all human life from conception to natural death. The Life charity not only opposed abortion but also offered support for pregnant women. Early on she took in pregnant girls to her own home. She helped set up a series of Life houses to provide accommodation for mothers with crisis pregnancies. She was National Administrator until she stepped down in 2017 with the onset of Alzheimer's disease. She also was actively involved in Life's national helpline, setting up the counselling service, the educational programme and operations. She travelled the country as a public speaker and to support the anti-abortion cause. She also supported the setting up of anti-abortion groups in Europe after the fall of the Berlin Wall. In 1992 she appeared as herself in two episodes of the TV series 'Short Circuit'.

== Papal honour ==
In 1991 she was voted Catholic Woman of the Year, and in 1993 she was conferred as a Dame of the Papal Order of Saint Sylvestre; her husband became a Papal knight in 1993.
