= Jack Scarisbrick =

British historian (1928–2026)

John Joseph Scarisbrick (6 October 1928 – 28 February 2026) was a British historian who taught at the University of Warwick. He was also noted as the co-founder, with his wife Nuala Scarisbrick, of Life, a British anti-abortion charity founded in 1970.

== Life and career ==
Born in London on 6 October 1928, Scarisbrick was educated at The John Fisher School and later Christ's College, Cambridge, after spending two years in the Royal Air Force. He specialised in Tudor history and his most critically acclaimed work is Henry VIII, first published in 1968. His revisionism, particularly his book The Reformation and the English People which argued that "English men and women did not want the Reformation and most of them were slow to accept it when it came", formed part of a broader wave in Tudor historiography with other historians such as Eamon Duffy and helping to form the basis for the theory of the long reformation.

Scarisbrick was elected a Fellow of the Royal Society of Literature in 1969. He was appointed MBE in 2015 for services to vulnerable people as founder of Zoe's Place, a hospice for children in Coventry.

Scarisbrick died on 28 February 2026, at the age of 97.
