= Bernd Moeller =

German Protestant theologian and church historian (1931–2020)

- Born: 19 May 1931 (age 94); Berlin, Germany
- Died: 29 October 2020
- Occupations: Protestant theologian and church historian

Bernd Moeller (May 19, 1931 – October 29, 2020) was a German Protestant theologian and church historian.

Bernd Moeller studied Protestant theology as well as history. In 1956 he received his doctorate from the Protestant theological department of the University of Mainz with the dissertation Die Anfechtung bei Johann Tauler (Religious scruples in the work of Johann Tauler). Two years later his habilitation followed on Johannes Zwick und die Reformation in Konstanz (John Zwick and the Reformation in Constance) at the University of Heidelberg. In 1964 he succeeded Ernst Wolf as the chair of church history with an emphasis on Reformation history at the University of Göttingen, and he taught there until his retirement in 1999 . He was succeeded in turn by Thomas Kaufmann.

Moeller is a specialist in general church history and the urban history in the late medieval and the Reformation era. He was chairman of the Society for Reformation Research. Moeller has taken part in the publication of nearly 40 books. His Geschichte des Christentums in Grundzügen (History of Christianity in Outline) has gone through ten editions. Of particular importance is Ökumenische Kirchengeschicht (Ecumenical Church History) a project jointly edited with Raymond Kottje which first appeared in 1970. This work showed from its first appearance that church history had entered a new era. In 1998 he received an honorary doctorate from the University of Zurich.

== Works ==
- Geschichte des Christentums in Grundzügen (History of Christianity in Outline), Vandenhoeck & Ruprecht, 10. völlig neu bearbeitete Auflage, Göttingen 2011, ISBN 978-3825209056.
- Deutschland im Zeitalter der Reformation (Germany in the Era of the Reformation), Vandenhoeck & Ruprecht, Göttingen 1977 (Deutsche Geschichte, Bd. 4) ISBN 3-525-33414-1
- Reichsstadt und Reformation, Evangelische Verlags-Anstalt, Berlin 1987 ISBN 3-374-00030-4; Eng. trans.: Imperial cities and the Reformation: Three essays. ed. and trans. by H. C. Erik Midelfort and Mark U. Edwards, Jr. (1972) Philadelphia: Fortress press.
- Die Reformation und das Mittelalter. Kirchenhistorische Aufsätze (The Reformation and the Middle Ages: Essays in Church History), Vandenhoeck & Ruprecht, Göttingen 1991 ISBN 3-525-58156-4
- Luther-Rezeption. Kirchenhistorische Aufsätze zur Reformationsgeschichte (The Reception of Luther: Essays in the Church History of the Reformation), Vandenhoeck & Ruprecht, Göttingen 2001 ISBN 3-525-55443-5
- Deutsche biographische Enzyklopädie der Theologie und der Kirchen (German Biographical Encyclopedia of Theology and the Church) ed., Saur, München 2005 ISBN 978-3-598-11666-7
- Spätmittelalter (Die Kirche in ihrer Geschichte, Lfg. H1) (The Late Middle Ages, vol. H1 of The Church and its History), Vandenhoeck & Ruprecht, Göttingen 1966 ISBN 978-3-525-52331-5
