= Nicola D'Ascenzo =

Stained glass artist (1871–1954)

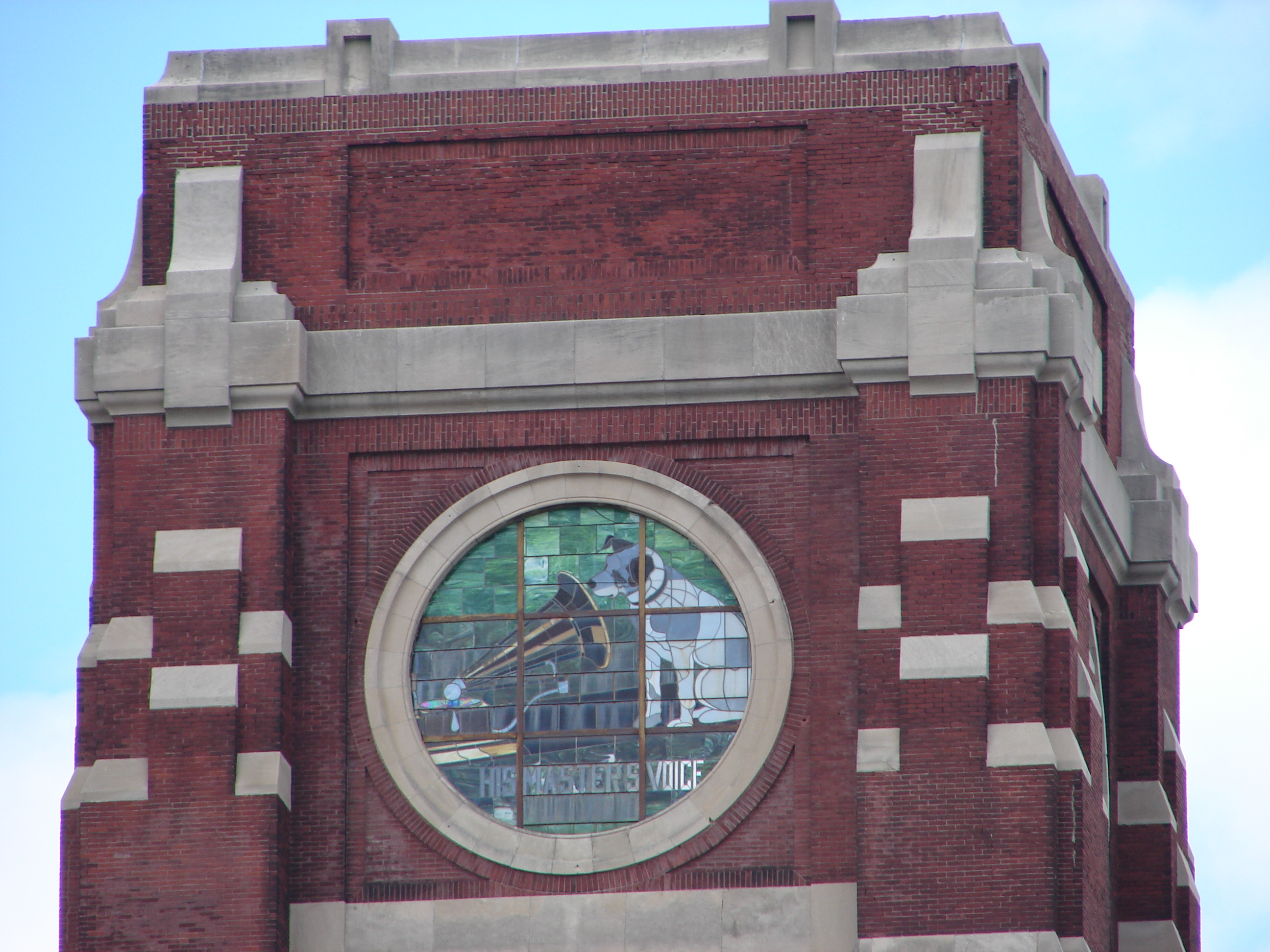
"His Master's Voice Window" (original, 1916; this replica, 2003), one of four replicas windows atop the tower of the Victor Building in Camden, New Jersey

Nicola D'Ascenzo (September 25, 1871, Torricella Peligna, Italy – April 13, 1954, Philadelphia, Pennsylvania) was an Italian-born American stained glass designer, painter and instructor.

D'Ascenzo Studios created stained glass windows for hundreds of buildings, notably, Washington Memorial Chapel in Valley Forge, Pennsylvania; Princeton University Chapel; Dwight Memorial Chapel at Yale University; Riverside Church in New York City; Loyola Alumni Chapel of Our Lady at Loyola University Maryland; and Folger Shakespeare Library and Washington National Cathedral, and the Pan American Union in Washington, D.C. The studio created stained glass windows, along with mosaics that covered the interior of the sanctuary, dome, and facade of Rodeph Shalom Synagogue in Philadelphia, Pennsylvania.

In 1916, the studio created four 14-foot-diameter roundel windows of His Master's Voice, the logo of the Victor Talking Machine Company, for the tower of the Victor Building in Camden, New Jersey. The four roundels were replaced by replicas in 2003; the originals are now in museums.

== Biography ==
D'Ascenzo was born in Torricella Peligna, Italy, into a family of artists, metalworkers and armor makers. His immediate family emigrated to the United States in 1882, and settled in Philadelphia, Pennsylvania. Working as a mural painter while in his teens, he attended night classes at the Pennsylvania Academy of the Fine Arts. He worked as a portrait painter and opened D'Ascenzo Studios, initially an interior decorating firm. D'Ascnzo attended and then taught at the Pennsylvania Museum School, where he met his wife, fellow instructor Myrtle Dell Goodwin (1864–1954). They married in 1894, and moved to Italy, where he studied at the Scuola Libera in Rome. The couple returned to Philadelphia in 1896, and had a daughter, Josephine.

D'Ascenzo Studios created Art Nouveau interiors (and later stained glass facades) for Horn & Hardart restaurants, a chain of about fifty automats that began in Philadelphia in 1902. The company's flagship restaurant in New York City (1912) was on Broadway at Times Square.

=== Stained glass ===
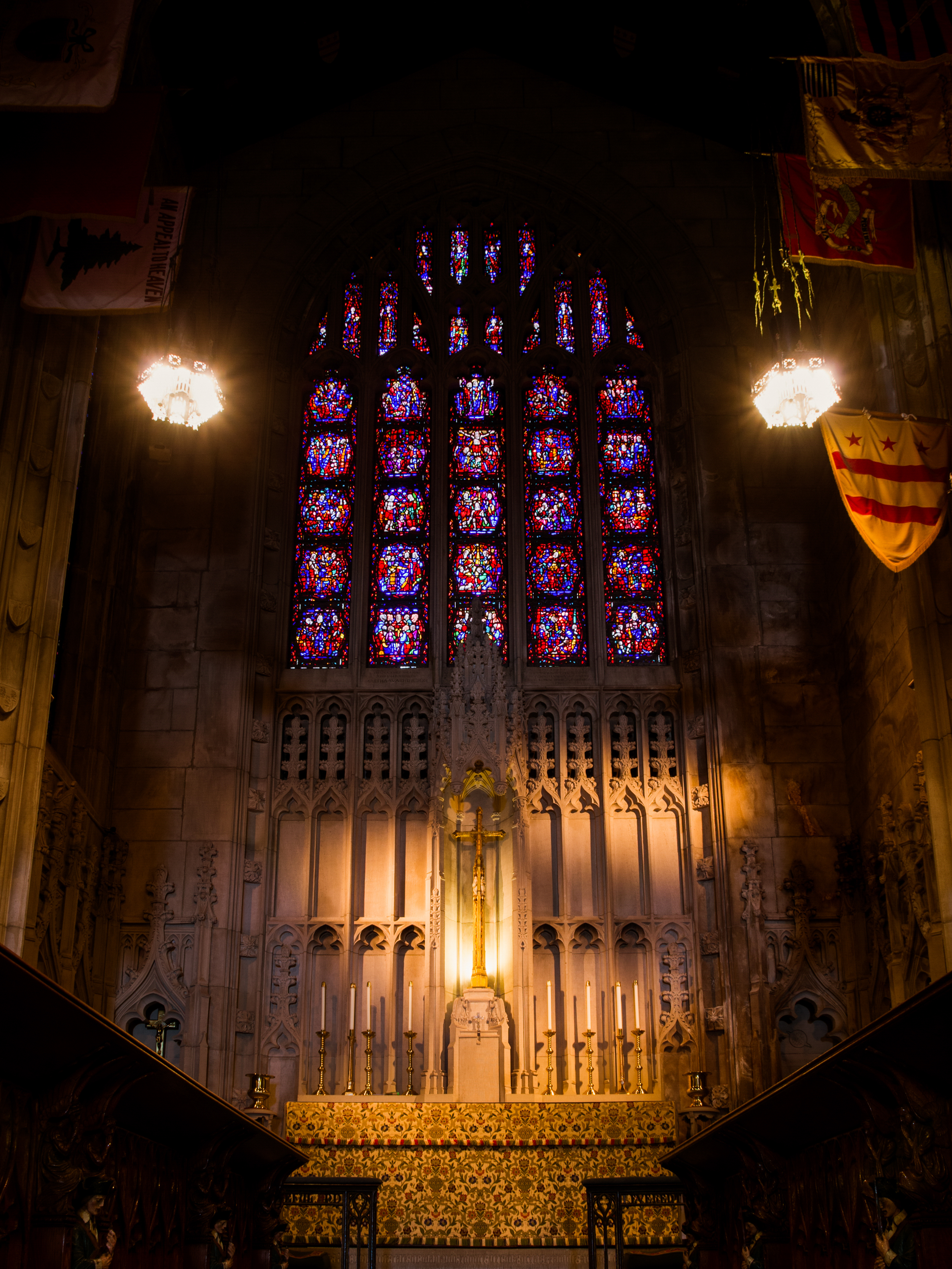
Martha Washington Memorial Window (1918), Washington Memorial Chapel, Valley Forge, Pennsylvania

D'Ascenzo dabbled in stained glass on his own for several years, and studied the craft at the New York School of Design, sometime around 1900. He completed his first stained glass commission in 1904. Initially, he bought glass from local manufacturers, but soon began making his own. Beginning in 1911, he spent his summers in Europe, making a comprehensive study of stained glass in cathedrals. In 1921, he was granted permission to set up scaffolding inside Chartres Cathedral for several weeks, to sketch and examine the windows up close. The following summer he did the same at Leon Cathedral in Spain.

Architect Milton Bennett Medary assembled an extraordinary team of collaborators for his Washington Memorial Chapel (1914–17) in Valley Forge, Pennsylvania – built on the grounds of the Continental Army's 1777–1778 winter encampment. D'Ascenzo Studios created thirteen stained glass windows (one for each colony); Samuel Yellin created wrought iron gates, hardware and locks; Edward Maene created oak reredos, choir stalls and church furniture; and sculptors Franklin Simmons, Alexander Stirling Calder, Bela Pratt, and Martha Maulsby Hovenden created statues and other works. The Reverend W. Herbert Burke, who led the decades-long effort to build the chapel, celebrated its completion:

The glowing imagery of stained glass associated with perpendicular Gothic is seen in full perfection. In this respect the chapel is comparable to the famous Sainte-Chapelle in Paris, but surpasses the European masterpiece in warmth and delicacy of execution as well as in symbolic appeal.

For the bell tower (completed 1953), D'Ascenzo Studios created a mosaic bust of George Washington and a Rose Window: Washington at Prayer.

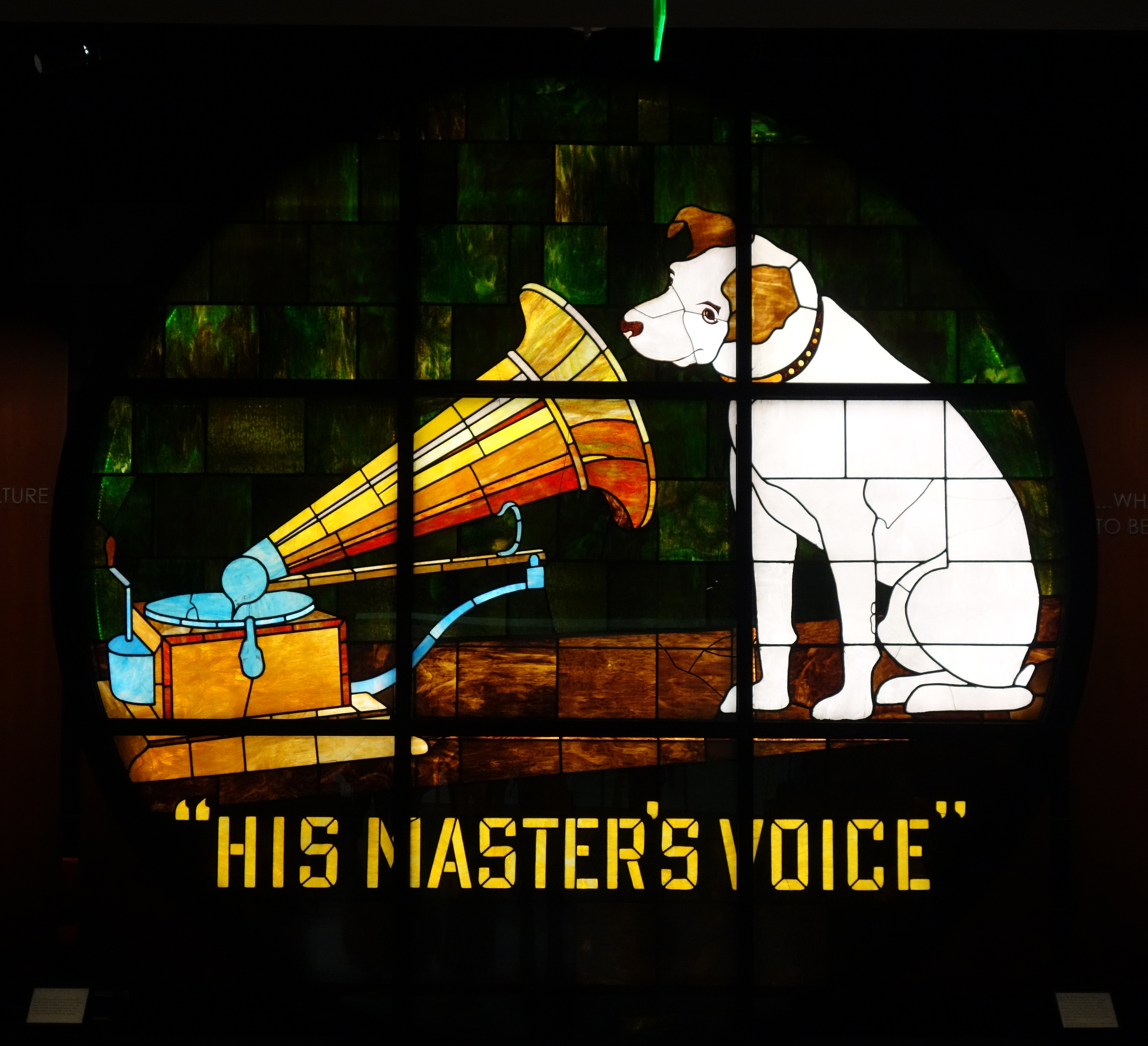
"His Master's Voice Window" (1916). Now in the collection of the National Museum of American History, Washington, D.C.

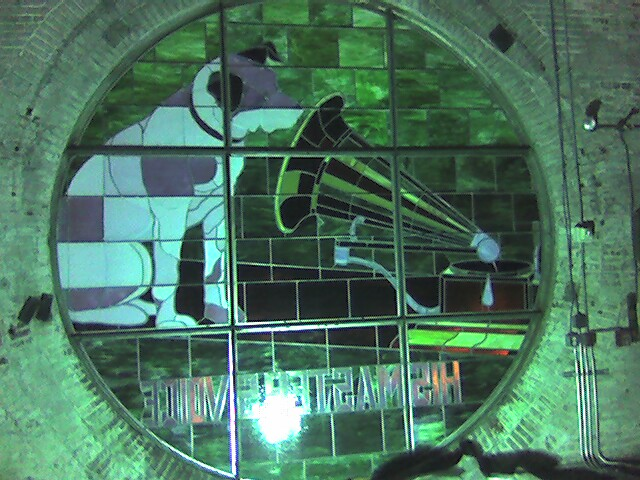
Replica of the His Master's Voice Window, from inside the tower, 2007.

In 1916, the studio completed four 14 ft (4.27 m)-diameter roundel windows for the tower of the Victor Talking Machine Company in Camden, New Jersey. Each depicted the company's logo – "His Master's Voice" (also known as "Nipper") – a dog listening quizzically to a gramophone. At night, the windows were illuminated, and the west-facing window was visible from Philadelphia, on the opposite side of the Delaware River. The original windows were removed in 1969, and D-Ascenzo Studios manufactured replicas that were installed in the tower in 1979. The current tower windows are 2003 replicas made by another firm. The Camden County Historical Society and the Wolfgram Library at Widener University each possess one of the original windows. Another original window, given to the Smithsonian Institution, is on display in the National Museum of American History.

Perhaps D'Ascenzo Studios' most varied commission was for Rodeph Shalom Synagogue (1927) in Philadelphia. The Moorish Revival building was designed by architects (and brothers) Grant and Edward Simon, and nearly every surface in its sanctuary was covered with decoration. The studio designed its murals, twenty stained glass windows (including the glass ceiling of the dome), lighting fixtures, carpets, and even the bronze ark for the Torah. The studio also created the mosaics on the synagogue's façade, whose colors remain vibrant after nearly ninety years.

For the Cathedral of the Air (1930) – a memorial chapel dedicated to World War I aviators, at Naval Air Station Lakehurst in New Jersey – the studio created a set of fifteen stained glass windows depicting the history of aviation. These ranged from Leonardo da Vinci's sketches of flying machines to Charles Lindberg's 1927 flight over the Atlantic Ocean (only three years earlier). Lakehurst was later the site of the 1937 Hindenburg disaster.

In three pairs of windows (1940) for the Cathedral of St. John the Divine in New York City, D'Ascenzo drew parallels between Biblical scenes and contemporary life. The "Press Bay" features Christ preaching and a modern minister at his pulpit; but also a printing press, Samuel Morse and his telegraph, a radio broadcast, and the invention of television. The "Sports Bay" features Samson slaying the lion and Jacob wrestling with the Angel; but also baseball, football, basketball, bicycle racing and other sports. The "Labor Bay" contrasts ancient occupations with modern ones.

=== Awards and honors ===
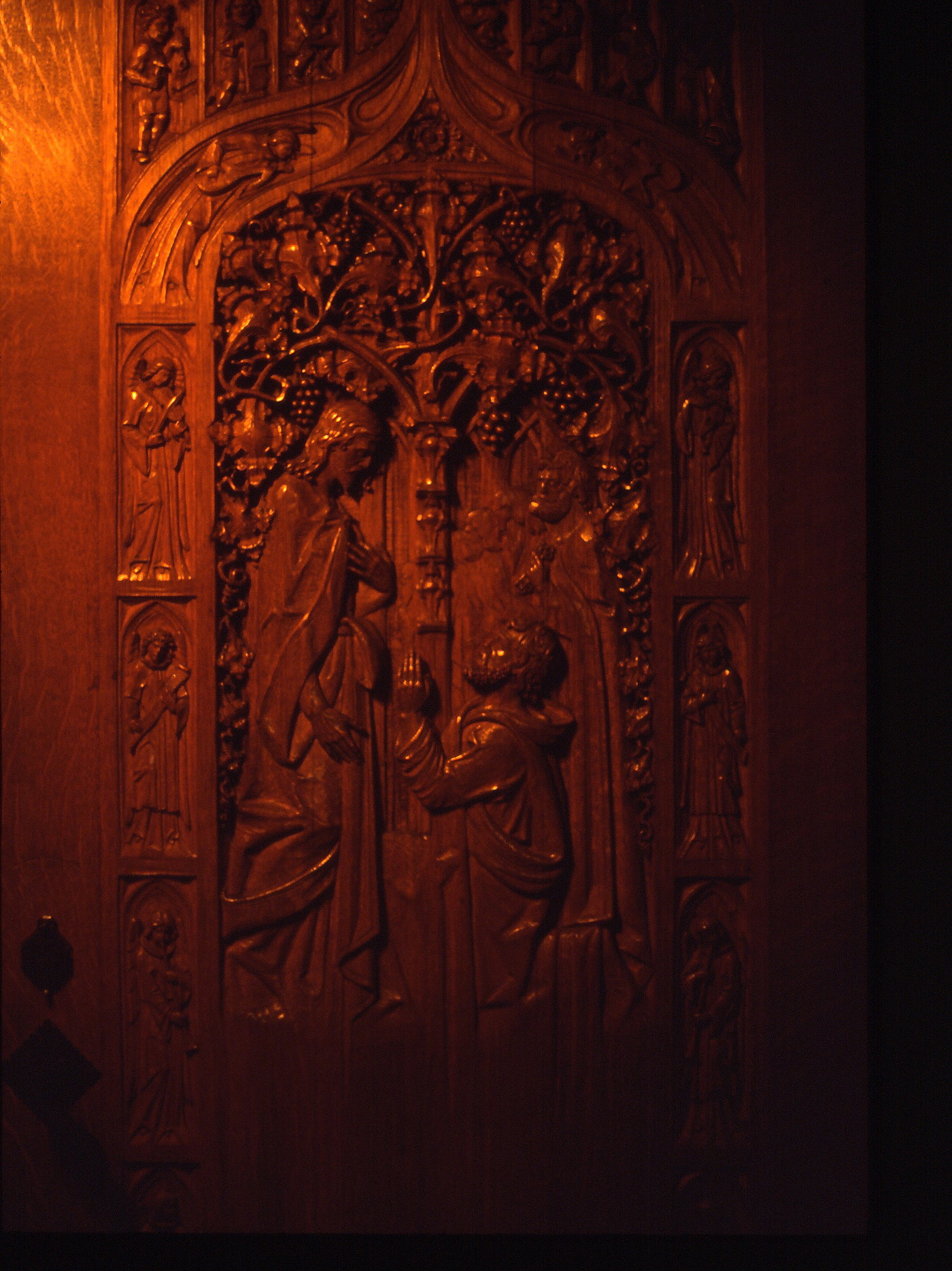
"Doubting Thomas" door (1928), Christ Church Cranbrook, Michigan. Johannes Kirchmayer's carving includes a portrait of D'Ascenzo.

D'Ascenzo was awarded a medal at the 1893 World's Columbian Exposition in Chicago; the 1898 Gold Medal from the T-Square Club of Philadelphia; second prize for craftwork at the 1916 Americanization Through Art Exhibition in Philadelphia (Samuel Yellin was awarded first prize); and the 1925 Gold Medal from the Architectural League of New York.

He exhibited at the Pennsylvania Academy of the Fine Arts: 1892–1904, 1916 & 1936. He served as President of the Stained Glass Association of America, 1929–1930. He was a member of the Philadelphia Board of Education (1934–1948), and organized art exhibitions that toured the city's public schools.

The University of Pennsylvania hosted a 1938 retrospective exhibition of D'Ascenzo's paintings, drawings and stained glass.

=== Legacy ===
Between 1904 and 1954, D'Ascenzo Studios completed more than 7,800 stained glass windows.

The "Doubting Thomas" door at Christ Church Cranbrook in Bloomfield Hills, Michigan features a tiny bas-relief portrait of Nicola D'Ascenzo as a medieval craftsman. Wood carver Johannes Kirchmayer carved portraits of the artisans who worked on the church.

The business records of D'Ascenzo Studios, including sketches of many of its windows and other works, are in the collection of the Athenaeum of Philadelphia. Paintings by D'Ascenzo occasionally appear at auction.

== Selected works ==
=== Religious buildings ===
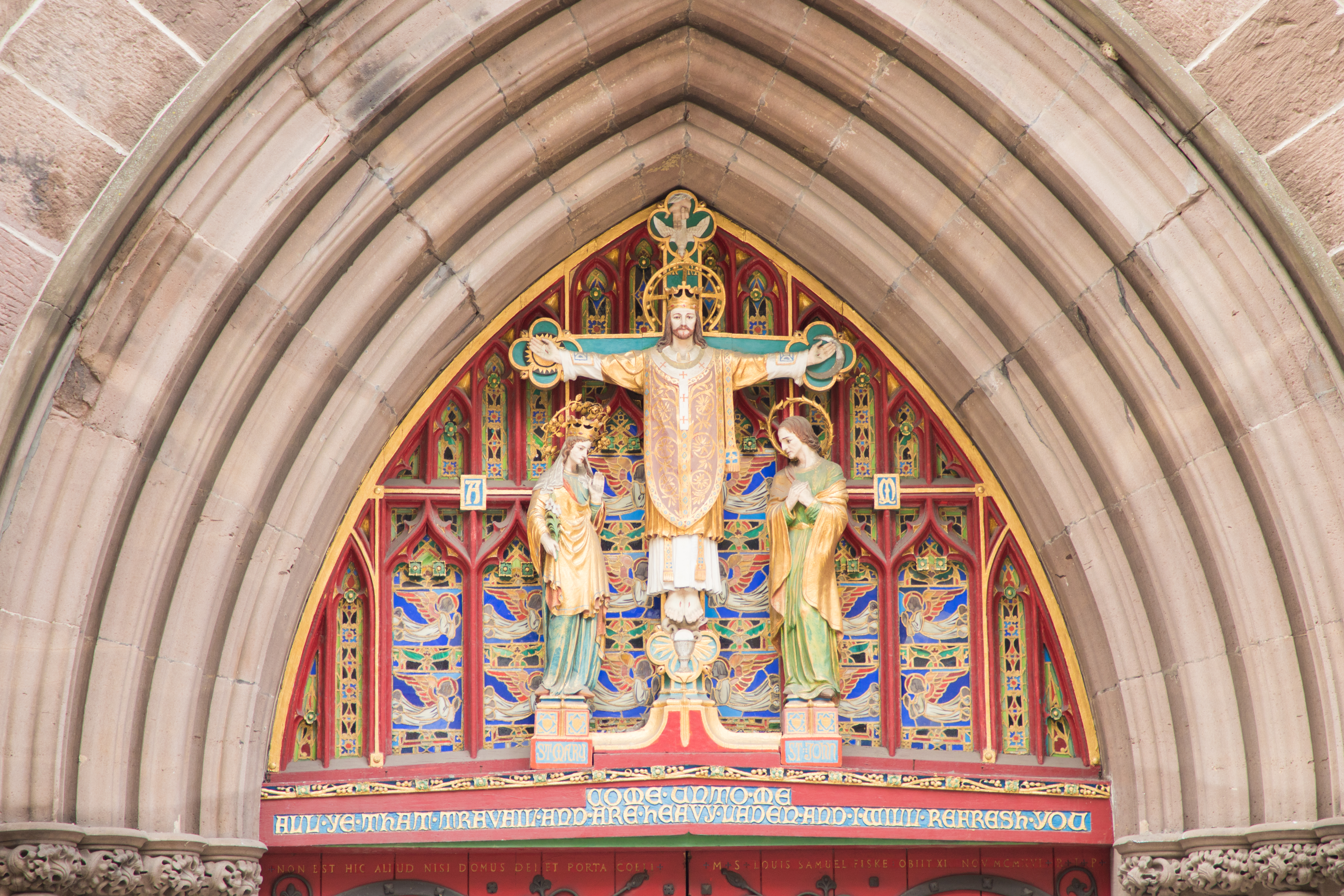
"Christ in Majesty' tympanum (1923), St. Mark's Episcopal Church, Philadelphia

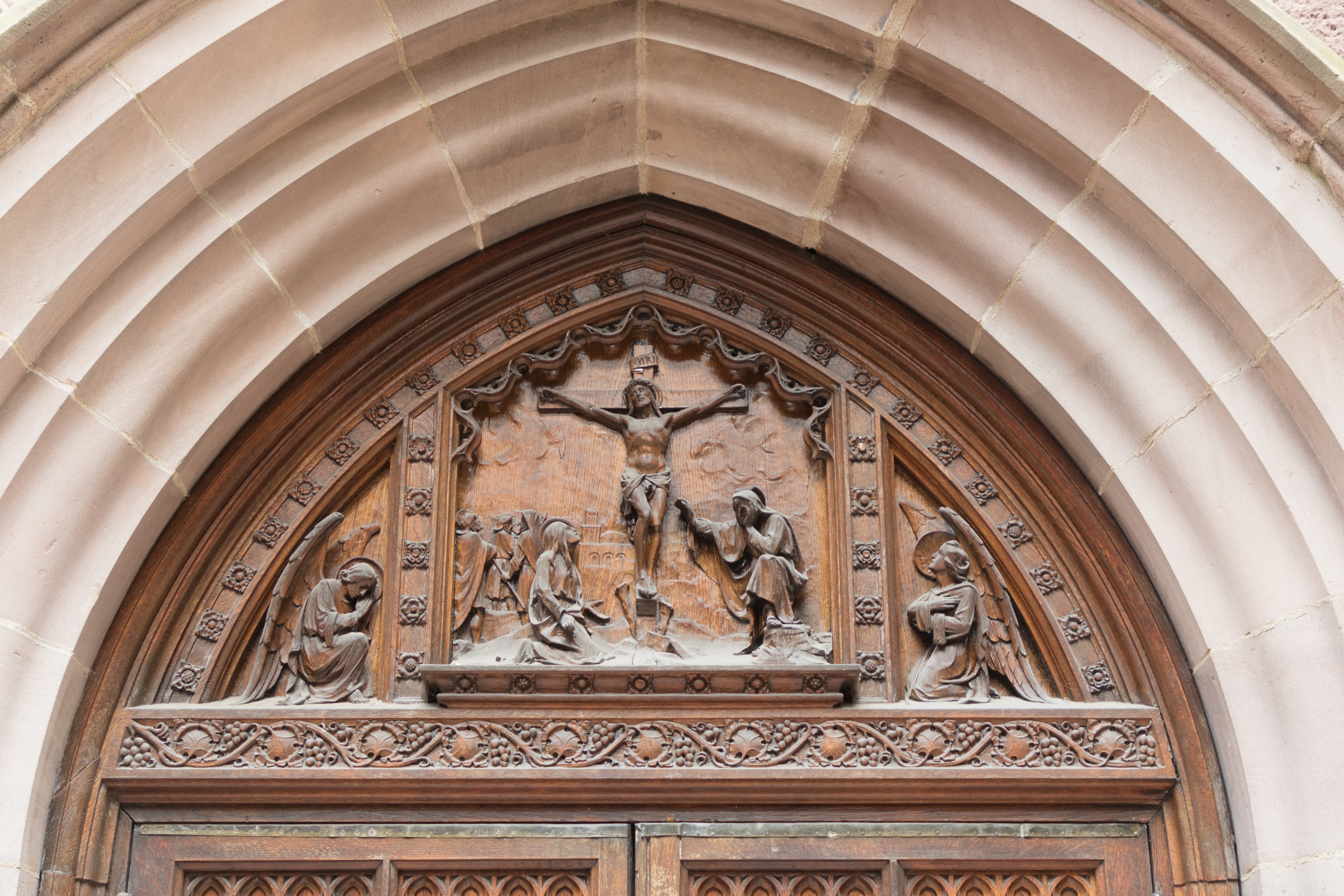
"Crucifixion" tympanum (1923), St. Mark's Episcopal Church, Philadelphia

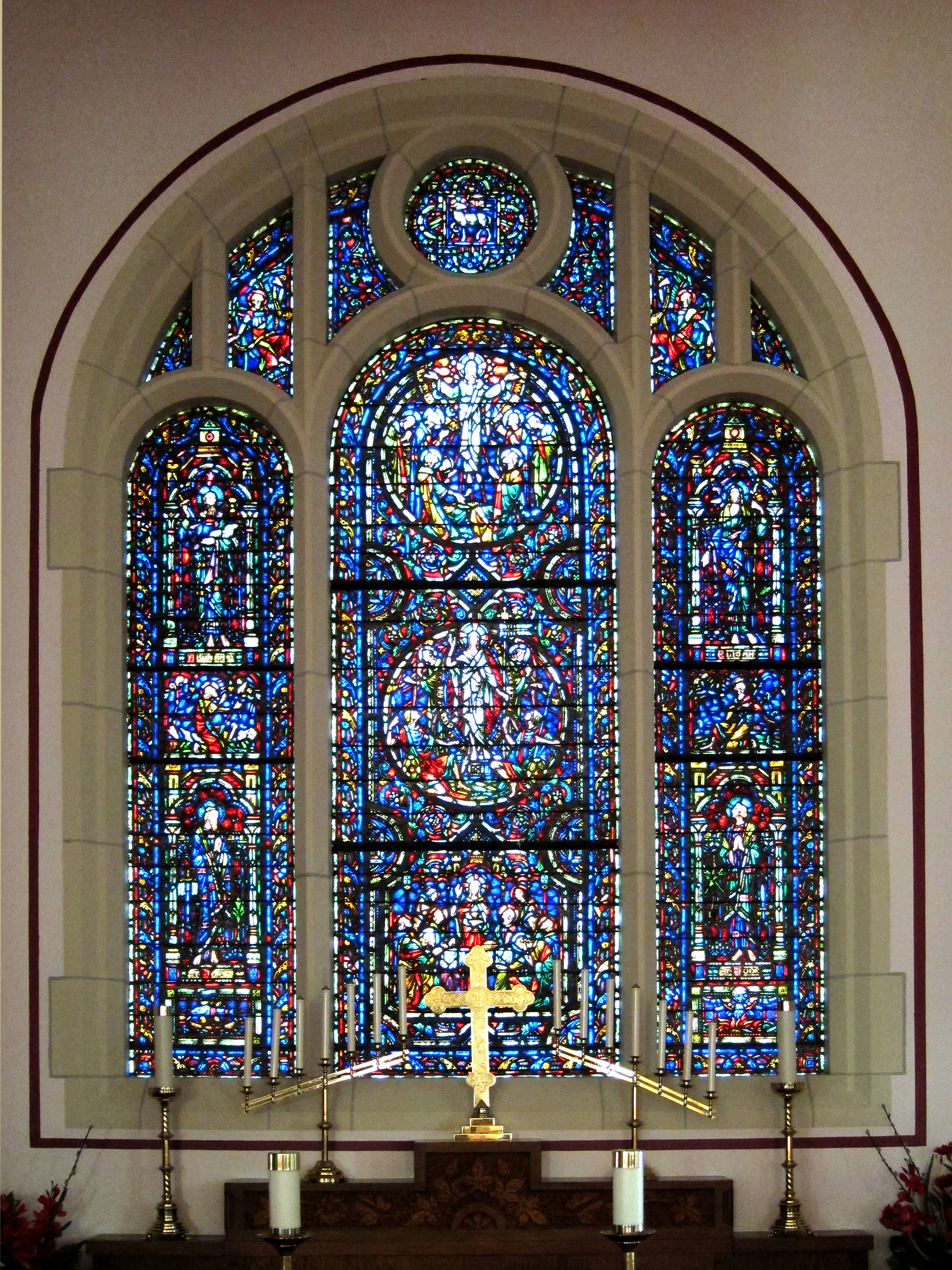
Dorrance Memorial Window (1924), Church of St. James the Greater, Bristol, Pennsylvania

- Church of the Evangelists (1887–88), Philadelphia, Pennsylvania. D'Ascenzo began as a 16-year-old assistant painter, but later completed five murals on his own. Now the Samuel S. Fleisher Art Memorial.
  - Murals: Visitation of Our Lady to St. Elizabeth, Nativity of Our Lord, Wedding at Cana (after Giotto), Laying Out of the Lord (after Fra Angelico), Appearance of the Risen Lord to Mary Magdalene (after Giotto).
- Mosaics and stained glass windows (1911), St. Francis de Sales Church, Philadelphia, Pennsylvania, Henry D. Dagit, architect.
- Ascension Window (ca. 1912), Church of the Good Shepherd, Scranton, Pennsylvania.
- 5 windows (1915, 1936, 1940), Trinity Memorial Episcopal Church, Binghamton, New York.
- St. Mark's Episcopal Church (1916), Frankford, Philadelphia, Pennsylvania.
- Washington Memorial Chapel, Valley Forge, Pennsylvania. D'Ascenzo and his family are buried in the churchyard.
  - Martha Washington Window: The Abundant Life (1918), north wall (over altar).
  - George Washington Window (year), south wall (over entrance). Depicts 36 scenes from Washington's life.
  - East windows – Revolution (1917), Patriotism (1917), The Union (1917), Democracy (1918)
  - West windows – Discovery (year), Bishop White Window: Settlement (1918), Anthony Wayne Window: Expansion (1921), Alexander Hamilton Window: Development (year)
  - Other windows – Carrying the Gospel to the Ends of the Earth, The New Birth and the New Freedom, Freedom through the Word
  - Washington at Prayer Rose Window (1953), bell tower chamber.
  - Mosaic: Bust of George Washington (1953), bell tower chamber.
- "Christ in Majesty' tympanum, Fiske Portal (1923), St. Mark's Episcopal Church, Philadelphia, Pennsylvania. The portal was designed by Zantzinger, Borie & Medary. D'Ascenzo Studios created the doors (with ironwork by Samuel Yellin) and the stained glass & polychromed wood "Christ in Majesty" tympanum.
- Dorrance Memorial Window (1924), Church of St. James the Greater, Bristol, Pennsylvania. Awarded the 1925 Gold Medal from the Architectural League of New York.
- 17 windows (1924), St. Francis of Assisi Church, Philadelphia, Pennsylvania. Following the church's 2012 closure, the windows were removed and re-installed at Holy Cross Church, Rumson, New Jersey.
- Two windows (1926 and 1927), Trinity Church on the Green, New Haven, Connecticut
  - Sermon on the Mount, David the Psalmist, and Moses the Law Giver
  - Angel Gabriel announcing his tidings to the Blessed Virgin Mary
- Windows, All Saints', Wynnewood
- Interiors and façade mosaics (1927), Rodeph Shalom Synagogue, Philadelphia, Pennsylvania.
- St. Thomas Window (1927–28), St. Thomas Episcopal Church, Fifth Avenue, New York City.
- Good Shepherd Window (Cyrus H. K. Curtis Memorial Window) (1928), Unitarian Society of Germantown, Philadelphia, Pennsylvania, Edmund Gilchrist, architect. In 1930, Nicola D'Ascenzo Jr. created a glass mosaic surrounding the window.
  - D'Ascenzo Studios created 13 additional windows for the church (1928, 1930, 1944). D'Ascenzo and his family were members of the congregation.
- Windows (1928), Independent Presbyterian Church, Birmingham, Alabama.
- The Second Coming of Christ Window (Great West Window) (1928), Princeton University Chapel, Princeton, New Jersey.
- Life of Christ Window (East Window) (1928), Christ Church Cranbrook, Bloomfield Hills, Michigan, Bertram Goodhue, architect.
- Ten Commandments Rose Window, Annunciation and Visitation Window (1929), Riverside Church, New York City.
- History of Aviation Windows (set of 15) (1930), Cathedral of the Air, Naval Air Engineering Station Lakehurst, New Jersey.
- Windows (1931), Dwight Memorial Chapel, Yale University, New Haven, Connecticut.
- Gideon Egner Memorial Chapel (1931), Muhlenberg College, Allentown, Pennsylvania.
- Larchmont Avenue Presbyterian Church, Larchmont, New York. The church features a rose window over the altar, a great hwindow facing west, 2-panel side windows, and 3-panel clerestory windows, all by D'Ascenzo Studios.
  - Rose Window (1931).
  - Christ of the Resurrection Window (Great West Window) (1947). A memorial to church members who served in World War II.
  - Old Testament windows: The Good Samaritan, The Prodigal Son, Moses, Abraham and Isaac, Ruth, Elijah, David, others.
  - New Testament windows: The Nativity, The Good Shepherd, The Sermon on the Mount, Jesus Blessing the Children, The Last Supper, The Crucifixion, others.
- Windows (1934), Chapel of Saint Joseph's Seminary in Plainsboro, New Jersey.
- Jesus and the Samaritan Woman Window (1935-1937), Chapel of the Holy Spirit, Washington National Cathedral, Washington, D.C. N.C. Wyeth painted the mural over the altar, and Samuel Yellin created the iron gates.
- 6 windows ("Press Bay," "Sports Bay," "Labor Bay") (1940), Cathedral of St. John the Divine, New York City.
- Conrad Weiser Window (year), Lutheran Theological Seminary, Germantown, Philadelphia, Pennsylvania.
- McBrier Window (1930), First Presbyterian Church of the Covenant, Erie, Pennsylvania.

=== Public buildings ===
- Evolution of the Book Windows (set of 4) (1904), Hatcher Library, University of Michigan, Ann Arbor, Michigan.
- America Receiving the Gifts of Nations (mosaic frieze, 1916), Cooper Library, Johnson Park, Camden, New Jersey. The mosaic frieze is 9 ft (2.74 m) tall and 72 ft (21.95 m) long, and features thirty-eight lifesized figures.
- Ages of Man Window (1931), Paster Reading Room, Folger Shakespeare Library, Washington, D.C. Elsewhere in the library are stained glass windows depicting Romeo, Portia, Touchstone, Cardinal Wolsey, and other Shakespearean characters.
- Calhoun College (Yale University residential college) (1933), New Haven, Connecticut, John Russell Pope, architect.
- Justice is the Queen of Virtues Window (1940), Lobby, Philadelphia Family Court Building, 1801 Vine Street, John T. Windrim, architect.
- World War I Memorial Tablet (1943), City Hall, Philadelphia, Pennsylvania.
- Agriculture and Industry, Birch Bayh Federal Building and United States Courthouse

=== Commercial buildings ===
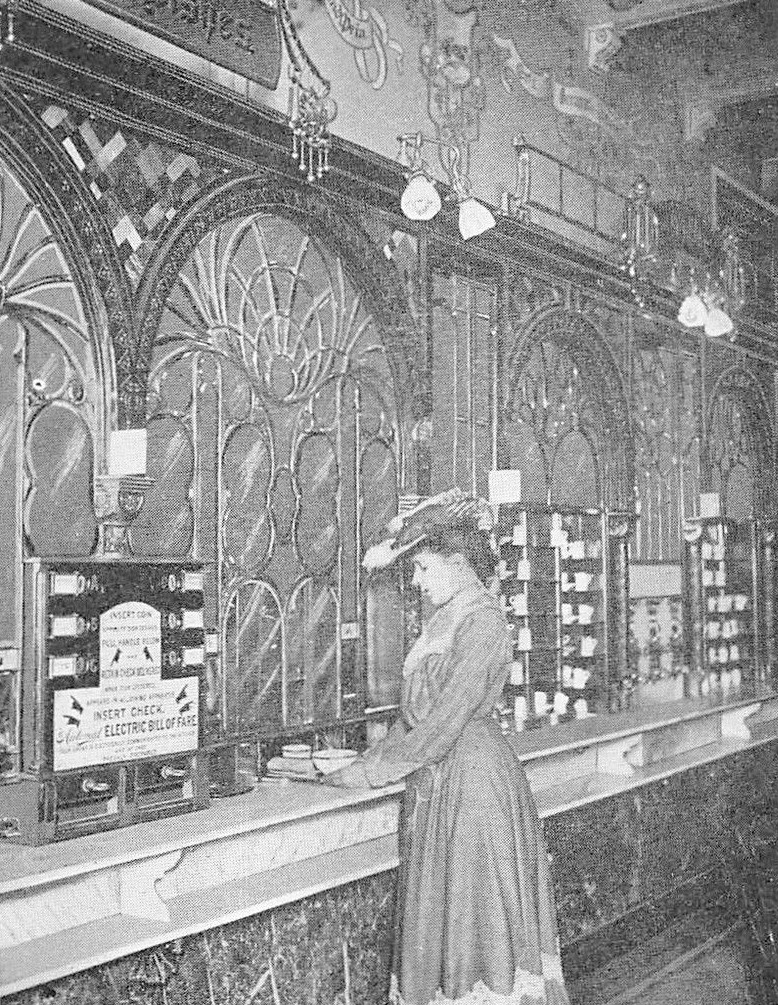
Horn & Hardart, Times Square (1912), New York City.

- Horn & Hardart Automat (1902), 818-20 Chestnut St., Philadelphia, Pennsylvania. First automat in the United States. D'Ascenzo Studios created its interiors.
- Horn & Hardart Automat & Cafeteria (1912), 1557 Broadway, New York City. D'Ascenzo Studios created the interiors and the stained glass façade. The facade was removed when the building was converted into a Burger King in the 1970s. It is now Grand Slam, a sports and souvenir shop.
- Window of Commerce (1912), Poughkeepsie Savings Bank, Poughkeepsie, New York. Depicts Henry Hudson aboard the Half Moon and Robert Fulton aboard the Clermont.
- Little Nipper Windows (set of 4) (1915–16), RCA-Victor Company Headquarters, Camden, New Jersey.
- History of Philadelphia Window (1928), Fidelity–Philadelphia Trust Company Building, Philadelphia, Pennsylvania, Simon & Simon, architects. The 25 ft (7.62 m)-tall window features scenes of William Penn, the Signing of the Declaration of Independence, George Washington as President, the newly-completed Philadelphia Museum of Art; and portrait medallions of famous Philadelphians.

=== Residences ===
- The Hunt Windows (set of 4) (ca. 1905), Metropolitan Museum of Art, New York City, design attributed to architect William Lightfoot Price. Made for the Frank van Camp residence, Indianapolis, Indiana.
- Paul Revere Window (1923), Cyrus H. K. Curtis residence, Wyncote, Pennsylvania.
- Dante and Beatrice Window (1927), Philbrook Museum of Art, Tulsa, Oklahoma.
- Thomas J. McKinney residence (1929), Buffalo, New York, James A. Johnson, architect.
- Canterbury Pilgrims Windows (set of 9) (1929), Study, Theodore Swann residence, Birmingham, Alabama. This was D'Ascenzo's largest (and most expensive) residential commission. The studio designed individual windows or sets of them for twelve additional rooms.
- Caravel Windows (1931), Dining room, Edward Bok residence, Merion, Pennsylvania.
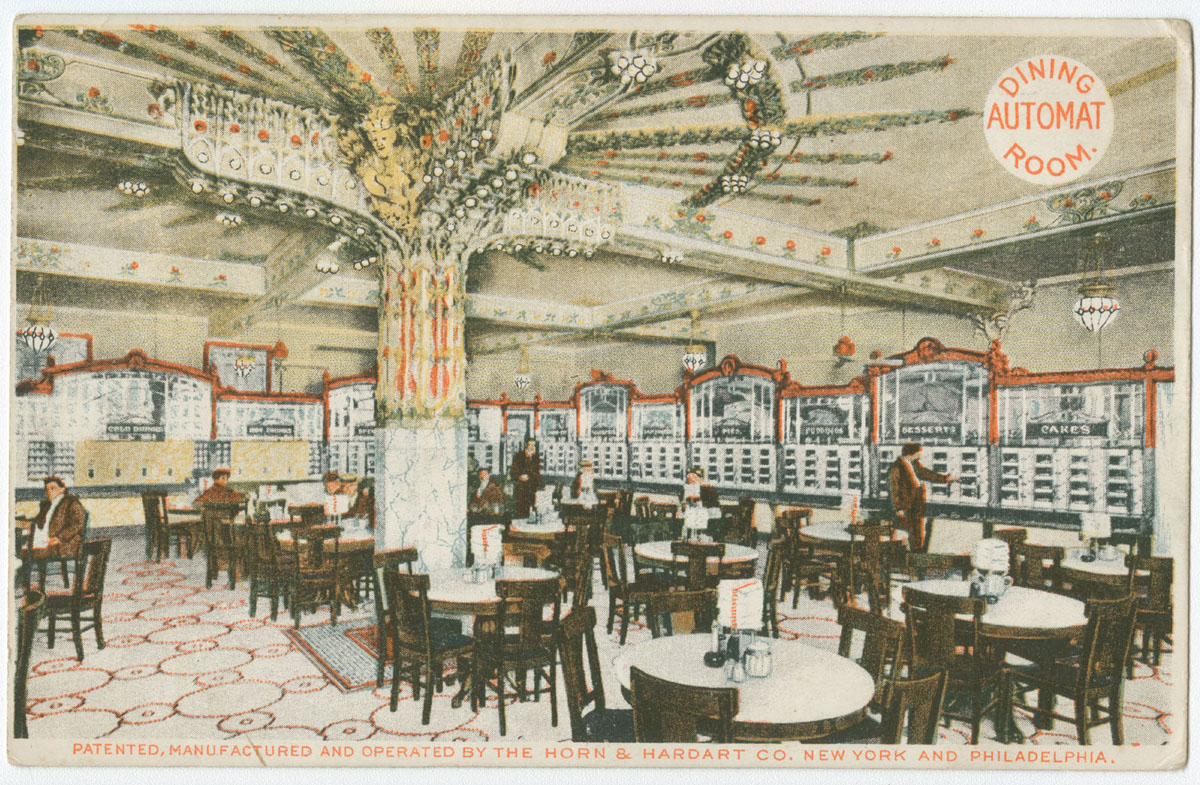
Horn & Hardart Automat (1902), 818-20 Chestnut Street, Philadelphia.

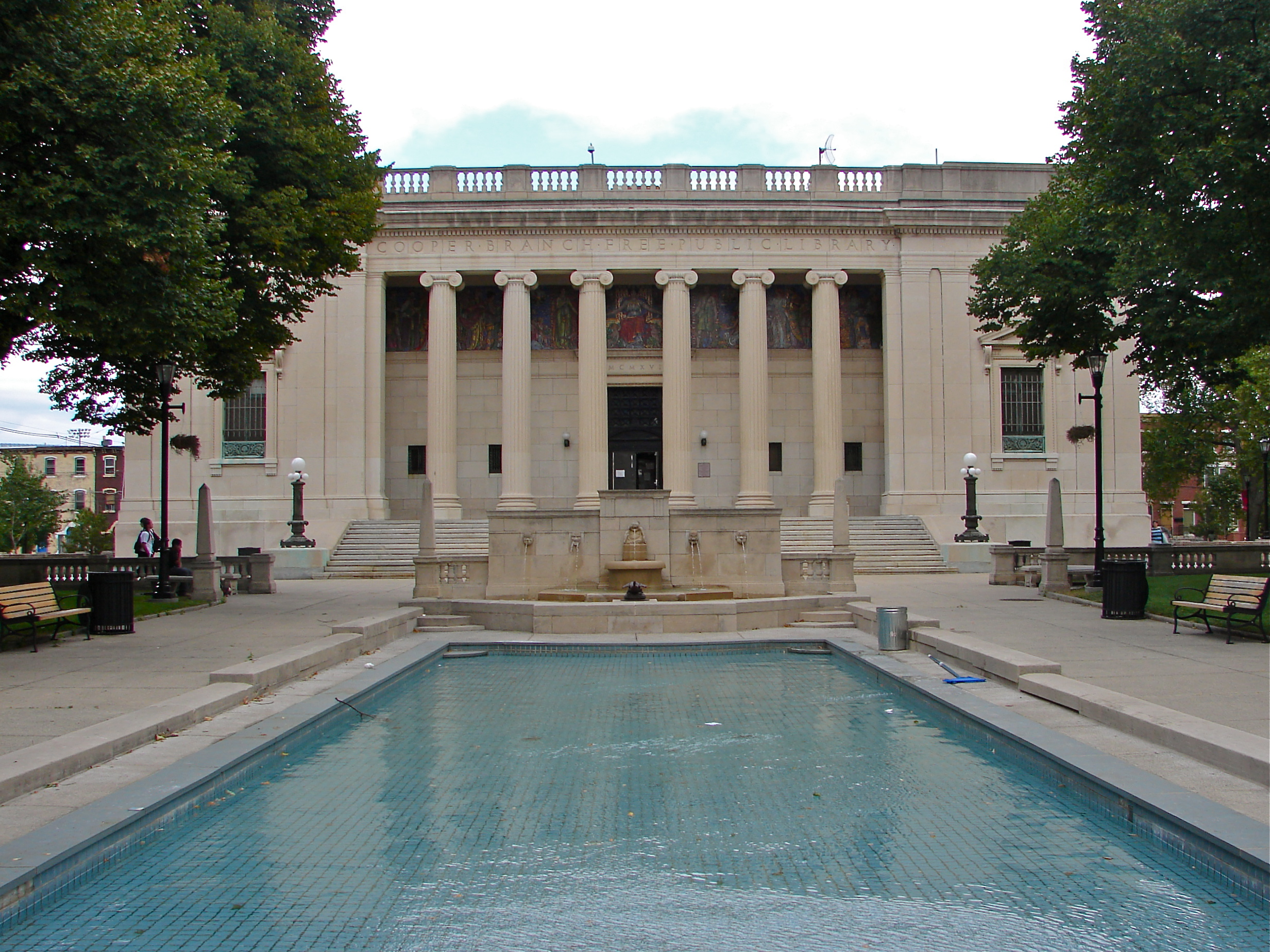
Cooper Library (1916), Camden, New Jersey. Note D'Ascenzo's mosaic frieze behind the colonnade.

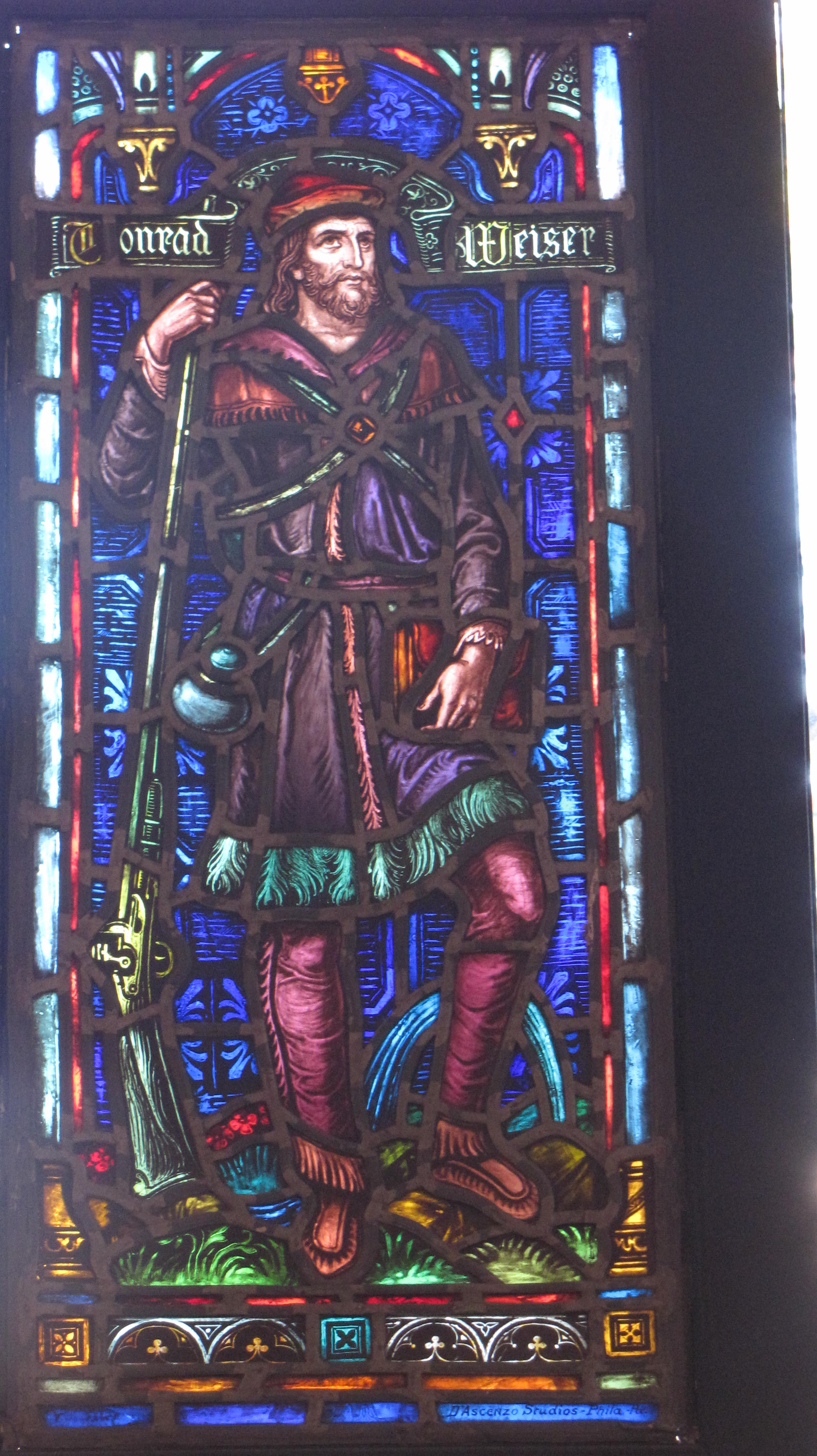
Conrad Weiser Window (year), Lutheran Theological Seminary at Philadelphia.

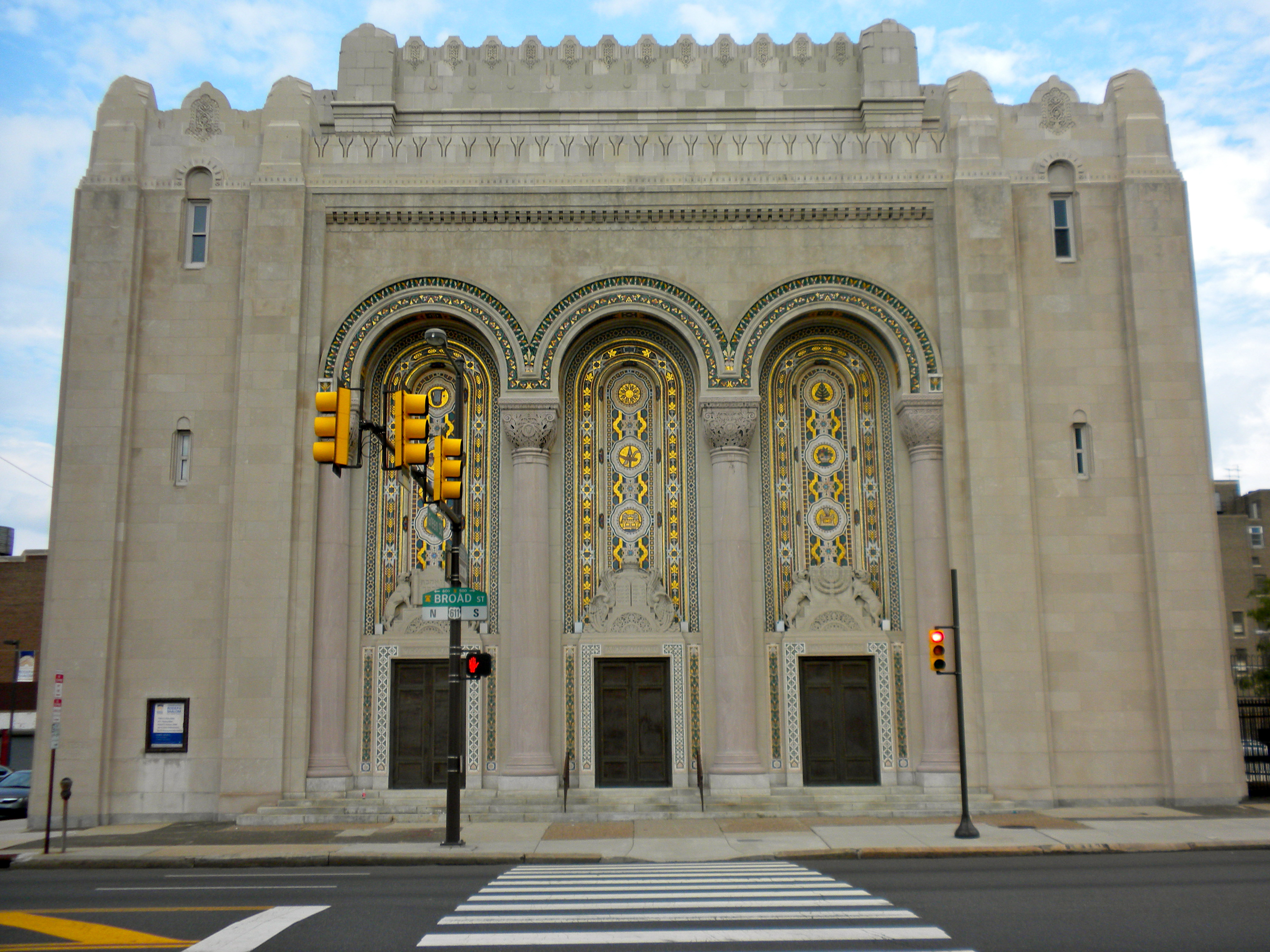
Facade mosaics (1927), Rodeph Shalom, Philadelphia.

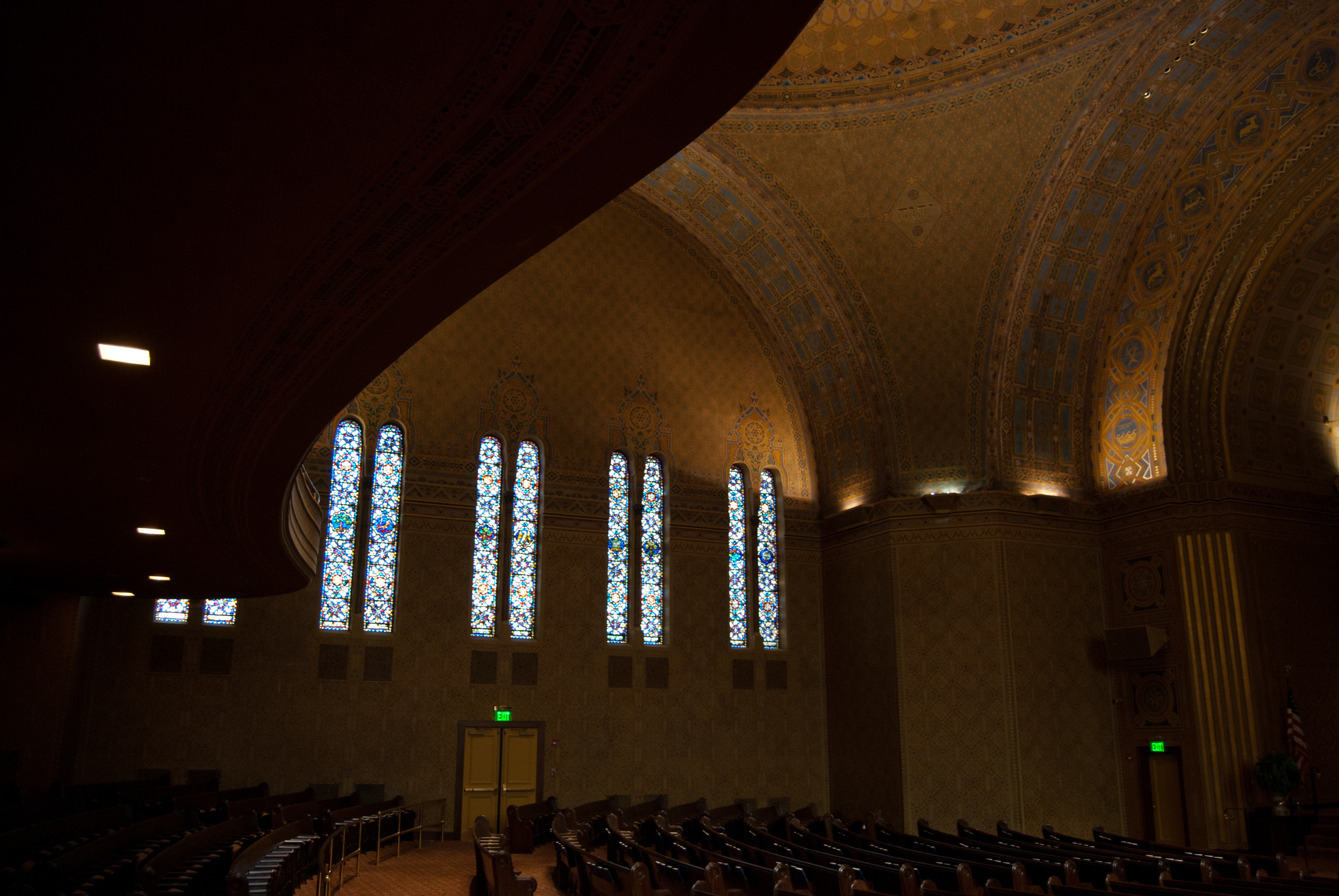
Interior (1927), Rodeph Shalom, Philadelphia.

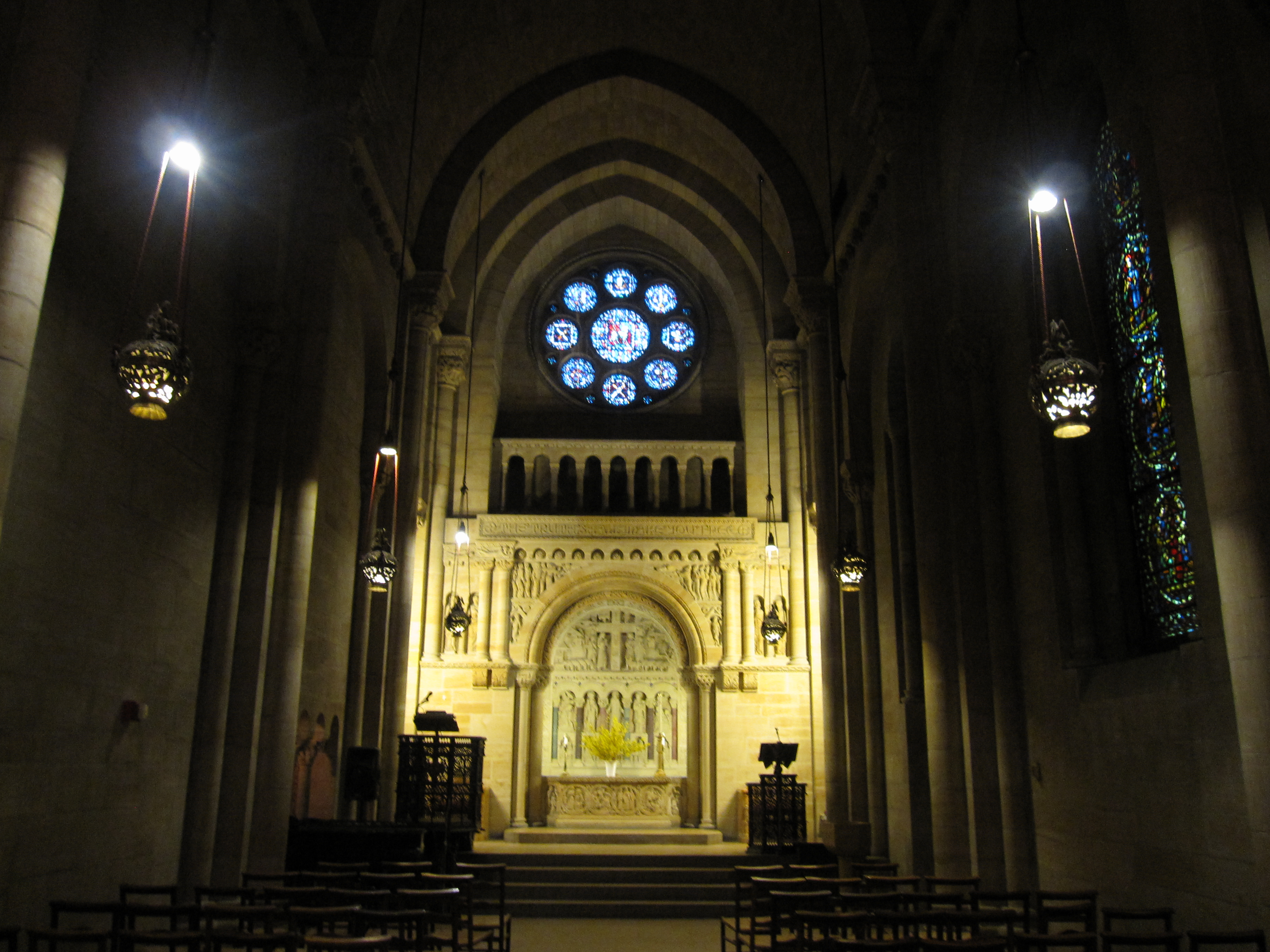
Ten Commandments Rose Window (1929), Riverside Church, New York City.

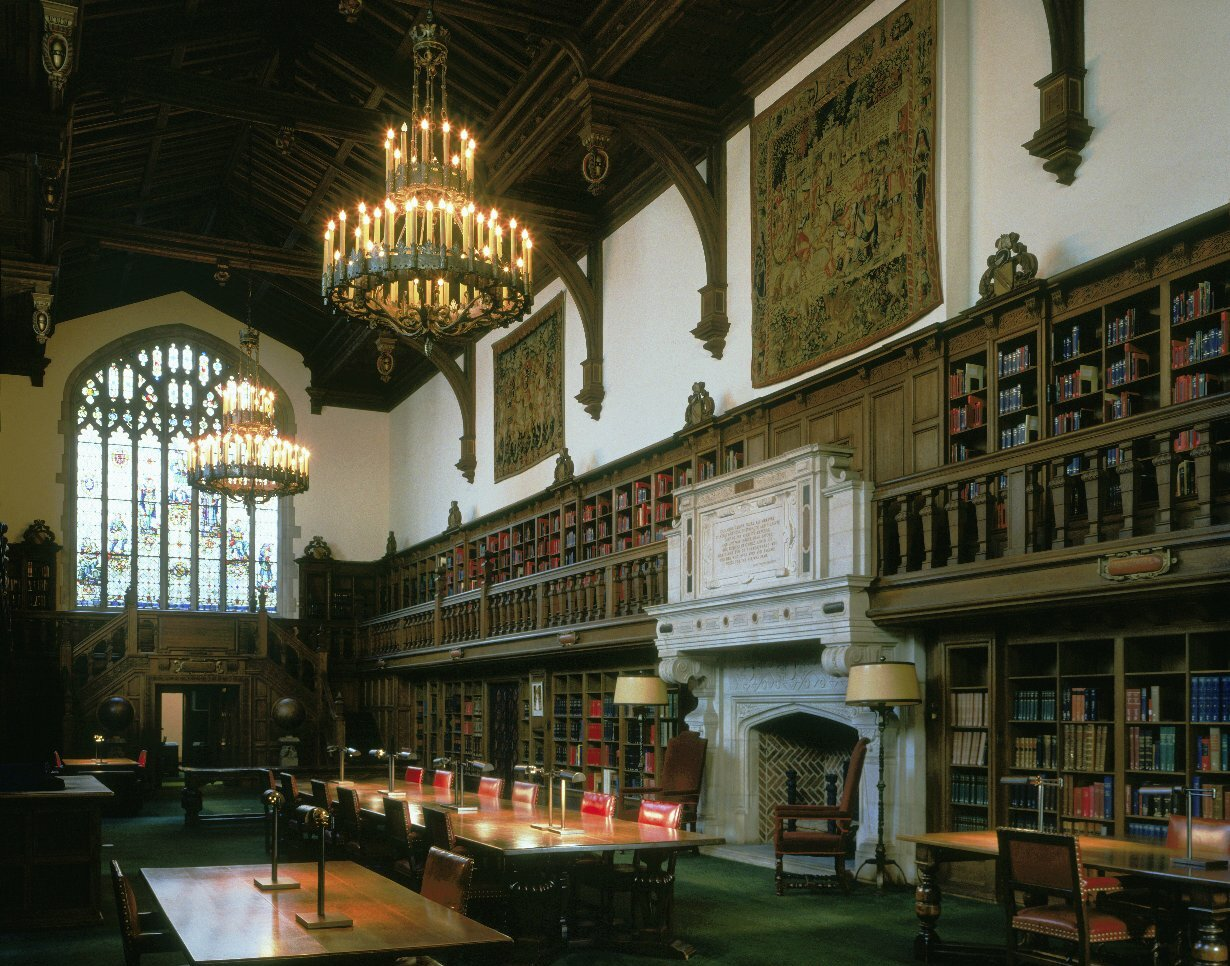
Ages of Man Window (1931), Folger Shakespeare Library, Washington, D.C.

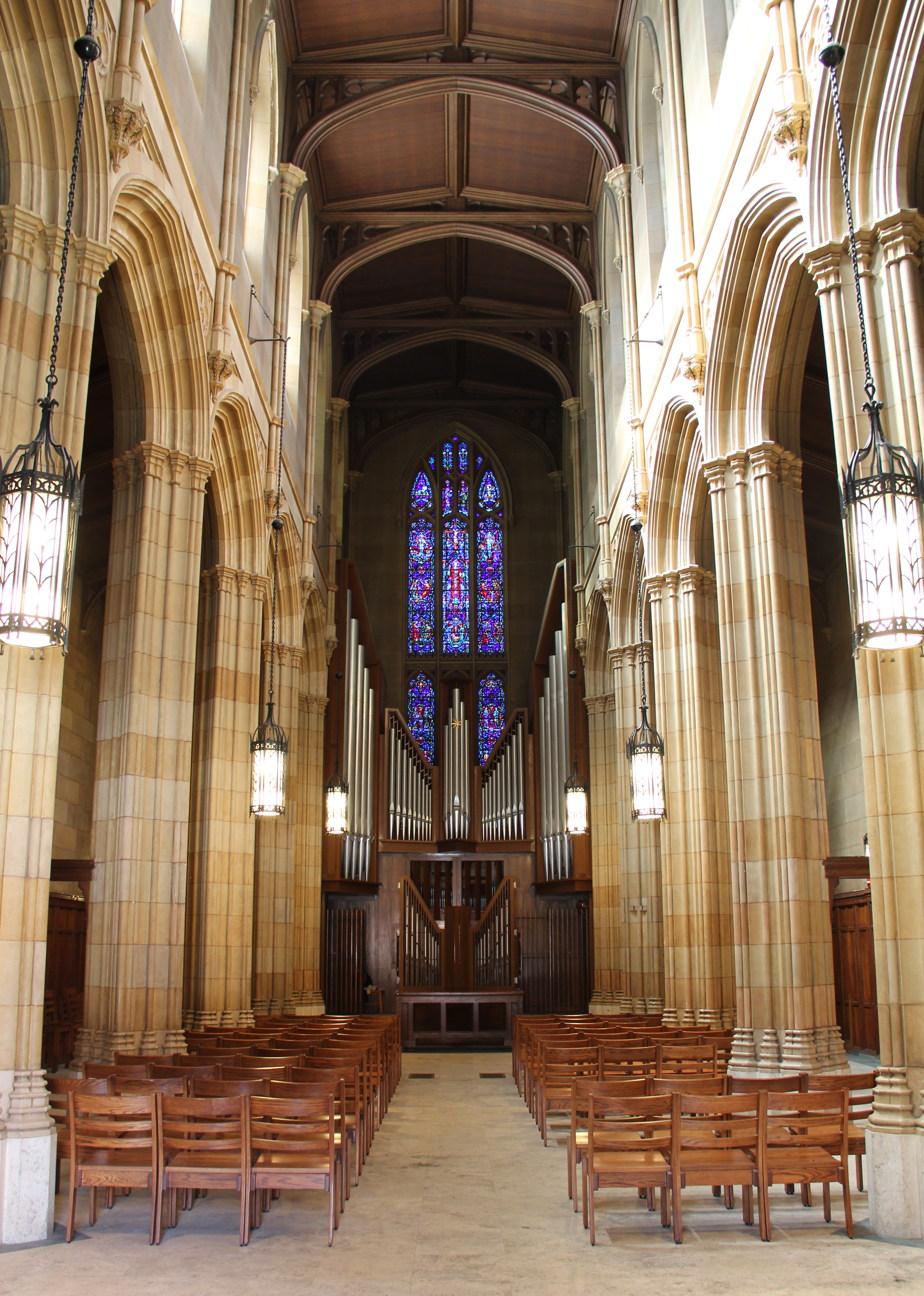
Dwight Memorial Chapel (1931), Yale University.

== Sources ==
- Frederick E. Mayer, "Nicola D'Ascenzo: Craftsman," The American Magazine of Art, vol. 9, no. 6 (April 1918), pp. 243–47.
- Obituary: "N. D'Ascenzo, Noted for Stained Glass," The New York Times, April 14, 1954.
- Exhibition catalogue: D'Ascenzo: The Art of Stained Glass, from the Collection of Hanley Switlik, Rider College, Trenton, New Jersey, 1973.
- Weilbacker, Lisa (1990). "A Study of Residential Stained Glass: The Work of Nicola D'Ascenzo Studios from 1896 to 1954". University of Pennsylvania ScholarlyCommons. Archived from the original on November 20, 2015.
