= Church of the Covenant =

Church of the Covenant may refer to:

- Church of the Covenant (Boston), a Protestant church and neo-gothic building in Boston, Massachusetts
- Church of the Covenant (Manhattan), a Protestant church and mixed architectural styles building in New York City, associated with J. Cleveland Cady
- Church of the Covenant (Cleveland), a historic neo-gothic Presbyterian church in Ohio
- Church of the Covenant (Pennsylvania), a Presbyterian church in Washington, Pennsylvania
- First Presbyterian Church of the Covenant (Erie, Pennsylvania), a Presbyterian Church in Erie, PA
