= Saint Augustine's Prayer Book =

Anglican devotional book

Saint Augustine's Prayer Book is an Anglo-Catholic devotional book published for members of the various Anglican churches in the United States and Canada by the Order of the Holy Cross, an Anglican monastic community.

The first edition, edited by Loren N. Gavitt, was published in 1947. The name of the book is a reference to St. Augustine of Hippo, the patron saint of the Order of the Holy Cross. Now in the eighteenth printing of the 1967 revised edition, it remains popular among High Church Anglicans in North America. It is used as a companion to the Book of Common Prayer (American editions of 1928 and 1979). In addition to various prayers and devotions, it includes the order of Mass according to the Anglican Missal, with the Prayer Book Canon of the Mass.

The 1947 original edition was republished in 1998 as Traditional St. Augustine's Prayer Book by Preservation Press of Swedesboro, NJ. It was subsequently republished with the same title by the Anglican Parishes Association, the publishing house of the Anglican Catholic Church. The revised 1967 edition was republished by the Anglican Parishes Association with the title of Saint Augustine's Prayer Book.

In 2014, a newly revised edition was published by Forward Movement, edited by David Cobb and Derek Olsen. Both the revised edition and the newly revised edition are sold by Holy Cross Monastery, of the Order of the Holy Cross.

== Contents of the 1967 revised edition ==
1. The Christian's Obligations: As to Worship, Fasting and Abstinence, and the Six Precepts
2. Common Forms of Prayer
3. Daily prayers
4. Various Prayers
5. Praise and Thanksgiving, including the Te Deum Laudamus
6. The Mass
7. Devotions for Holy Communion
8. Spiritual Communion
9. Sacrament of Penance
10. Benediction of the Blessed Sacrament
11. Devotions to the Blessed Sacrament
12. Stations of the Cross
13. Prayers in Sickness, and for the Sick
14. Prayers for the Dead
15. Requiem Mass, including an English version of the Dies irae
16. Devotions to the Trinity, including the Athanasian Creed
17. Devotions to the Holy Ghost
18. Devotions to the Sacred Heart of Jesus
19. Devotions to the Blessed Virgin Mary, including the Holy Rosary and Antiphons of the Blessed Virgin
20. Devotions to St. Joseph
21. Devotions to the Angels
22. Various Litanies
23. Novenas, including Novena to the Holy Ghost, with English version of Veni Creator Spiritus
24. Devotions for Christmas
25. Devotions to the Passion
26. Holy Hours
