= American Church Union =

American Church Union (ACU) is the name of several distinct Anglican organizations in the American Episcopal Church and the Anglican Continuum. The groups have had an Anglo-Catholic orientation. It is named in imitation of the English Church Union.

The first American Church Union held its inaugural annual meeting at Trinity Church, Wall Street, on April 23, 1868. It participated in controversies about Anglican Ritualism and emerging Anglo-Catholicism in the Episcopal Church.

Another group calling itself the American Church Union was organized in 1908 in response to the Open Pulpit Controversy of William McGarvey and his followers in the Congregation of the Companions of the Holy Saviour (CSSS). It organized Anglo-Catholic Episcopalians who resisted departures to the Roman Catholic Church. This ACU subsequently became the Churchman's Alliance, which organized events and publications in the 1910s and 1920s.

On May 31, 1936, a third American Church Union was organized as an outgrowth of the Catholic Congress movement of the Episcopal Church. The purpose of this ACU was: "To uphold the doctrine, discipline and worship of the Episcopal Church, to extend the knowledge of the Catholic Faith and Practice of the Church at home and abroad; to seek thereby to bring everyone to worship and serve our Lord Jesus, Saviour and King." The current ACU organization had offices in New York City, Pelham Manor, and Berkeley, California.

This American Church Union was incorporated in 1947 in California with EIN 13-1883818 and is currently a publishing imprint of the Anglican Province of Christ the King. Its periodical American Church News was the immediate predecessor of The New Oxford Review (NOR); NOR was formed in 1984 when the majority of American Church News staff and writers became Roman Catholics. The ACU also sponsored a youth wing known as the Servants of Christ the King, with its own rule of life and annual events.

During its existence in the Episcopal Church, the ACU provided resources and political organization for many allied causes, such as removing the word Protestant from the official name of the church, opposing the creation of the united churches of South India and North India, resisting changes to marriage discipline, promoting fasting before reception of communion, offering advice on liturgical revision and canonical changes, attempting to derail the creation of the jurisdiction of Navajoland, and eventually removing itself from the Episcopal Church over the ordination of women to the priesthood. It was a sponsor of The Living Church weekly magazine, and issued an internal cycle of prayer for member parishes, tracts, and a directory of churches in sympathy with its aims.

After the decision of most ACU members to join several bodies that left the Episcopal Church from 1976 onward, the Church Union sold its retreat center and mansion at 60 Rockledge Drive, Pelham, New York in order to settle indebtedness toward contracted employees who remained Episcopalians.

== Notable members ==
- Reginald R. Belknap
- Albert A. Chambers
- George H. Clendenin SSC
- Edward Darrach
- Albert J. duBois, executive director 1950–1974
- William Elwell
- Howard Lane Foland
- Loren N. Gavitt
- Washington Irving III
- Perry Laukhuff
- Ella Lingley (1889–1983, ACU secretary 1945–1974)
- Admiral Ephraim R. McLean
- Frederic Cook Morehouse, publisher
- Robert S. Morse, executive director 1976–2015
- Henry Harrison Oberly
- Charles H. Osborn, executive director 1974–1976
- Jerome Politzer
- Thomas Newton Whiteside Rae
- Roy Rogers, American singer and actor
- George W. Rutler
- John Stoll Sanders (1947–2021, manager and director of publications)
- Judge F. H. Schlichting
- Ruth C. Sloan (1924–2013)
- William Knipe Tinkham
- Frank L. Vernon

== Bibliography ==
- Elliot White, The American Church Union: Its Origin, Organization, Aims, Principles, Methods, and Work (1910)
- Canon Nineteen: What It Is, How We Got It, and How It Works
- Frank L. Vernon, Union or Unity?
- F. C. Morehouse, Protestant Episcopal: An Appreciation
- M. M. Benton, Unity and the Change of Name
- G. Woolsey Hodge, Why Protestant
- Frank Lawrence Vernon, The Reconciliation of the Schools of Thought
- W. A. Buchanan, Why Not Our True Name?
- Elliot White, What Is a Catholic?
- Louis T. Scofield, Confirmation

== See also ==
- The Church Union (formerly English Church Union)
- Swedish Church Union
- Albert J. duBois
