= Albert J. duBois =

US Anglo-Catholic priest (1906–1980)

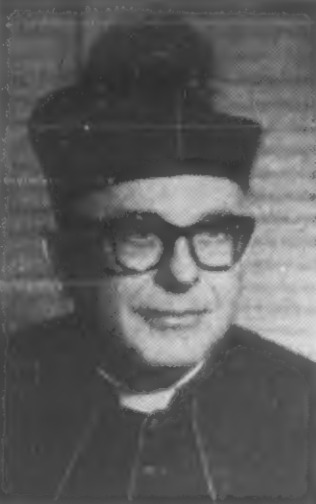
DuBois in 1955

Albert Julius duBois (June 9, 1906 — June 6, 1980) was an influential American Anglo-Catholic priest during the 20th century.

Born in Neenah, Wisconsin, he was the son of Albert Julius du Bois and Emma Luella (Thurston) du Bois. He was a Phi Beta Kappa graduate of Lawrence University, and received the STB from the General Theological Seminary in New York City in 1931. He was ordained to the priesthood on November 1, 1931, by Bishop Reginald Heber Weller of the Episcopal Diocese of Fond du Lac. He served at two small churches in Wisconsin before his term as canon pastor of St. Paul's Cathedral, Fond du Lac, from 1935 to 1938. He was also rector twice of the Church of the Ascension and St. Agnes in Washington, D.C., serving from 1938 to 1941 and 1946 to 1950, with significant interruptions for military service under General George S. Patton in the European Theatre. (He was initially rector of the Church of St. Agnes, and rector of the combined parish from 1947.) From 1974 until 1977, duBois was professor of liturgics and church history at the Episcopal Theological Seminary in Kentucky.

DuBois was a major figure in 20th-century church controversy and journalism. He was executive director of the American Church Union from 1950 to 1974, with offices at 347 Madison Avenue (demolished 2021). He was the first individual to hold this position, and also editor of its periodical, American Church News. DuBois articulated a traditionalist Anglo-Catholic position on many matters, including the creation of the Church of South India, the work of the Consultation on Church Union (COCU), and later 20th-century liturgical changes.He advocated for closer relations with Catholic or Orthodox churches. He also took a negative line on whether President Lyndon B. Johnson could receive communion at Episcopal churches. In 1976 duBois became president of Episcopalians United, which was opposed to revision of the 1928 Book of Common Prayer and the ordination of women; the American Church Union declared this organization to be defunct in September 1976. In February 1977, duBois founded Anglicans United, a separate group with similar aims, and served as its first president.

Following the September 1976 General Convention resolutions in favor of the 1979 Book of Common Prayer and the ordination of women, duBois renounced his orders in the Episcopal Church. He was deposed from the priesthood by Bishop Jonathan G. Sherman of the Episcopal Diocese of Long Island on September 28, 1977. (He had been canon of the Cathedral of the Incarnation, Garden City, since 1950.)

With clergy and members of five like-minded congregations of the Episcopal Church, on June 29, 1978, duBois formed the Pro-Diocese of St. Augustine of Canterbury, a non-geographical jurisdiction created to seek recognition for an Anglican rite within the Roman Catholic Church. This diocese competed with an earlier Anglican Church in North America, formed in 1977, and its constituent Diocese of the Holy Trinity. DuBois was elected bishop of the Pro-Diocese of St. Augustine of Canterbury, but never consecrated. The diocese described itself as "an alliance of priests and parishes formerly associated with the PECUSA who are working and praying for recognition as a Catholic body within the Roman Catholic Church but while retaining the features of the liturgical and spiritual ethos of our Anglican heritage".

He died in Long Beach, California and is buried at Oak Hill Cemetery in Neenah, Wisconsin.

== Bibliography ==
- The Church of South India Question: A Study Including Interesting and Pertinent Passages from Various Books, Pamphlets, and Magazine Articles Not Readily Available Elsewhere (1958)
- (editor) The Truth and the Life: Essays on Doctrine by Priests of the American Church Union (1961)
- Confirmation and Open Communion (1964)
- C.O.C.U.: Truly Catholic? Truly Evangelical? Truly Reformed? (1967)
- The Ordination of women, Why? Now? (1976)
- So You Are an Episcopalian (undated)

== See also ==
- Anglican Use
- Congress of St. Louis
- Continuing Anglican movement
- Pastoral Provision
- Personal ordinariate
