= Frank L. Vernon =

Anglo-Catholic priest

Frank Lawrence Vernon (né MacLaren; March 17, 1873 – May 24, 1944) was a Canadian-American Anglo-Catholic priest, author, convent chaplain, retreat conductor born in Saint John, New Brunswick. By "An Act to legalize the name of Frank Lawrence Vernon" on April 21, 1894, the General Assembly of Her Majesty's Province of New Brunswick recognized the change of his surname from MacLaren to Vernon for the purposes of inheritance from his mother's estate.

== Early life and education ==
He was educated at Trinity College, Toronto (BA 1893) and the former Episcopal Theological School in Cambridge, Massachusetts (1896). He received an honorary Doctor of Divinity degree from Trinity.

Vernon married Alice Esther Whiton in St. Stephen's Church, Lynn, Massachusetts on June 17, 1895, the week after his ordination to the priesthood by the Right Reverend William Croswell Doane, Episcopal Bishop of Albany. Mrs. Vernon gave birth to a son and daughter, and died of a blood malignancy on August 23, 1903. Vernon never remarried, and raised his two children as a single priest. His daughter Alice Frances Vernon became a nun of the Community of Saint Mary as Sister Mary Regina.

== Career ==
He was rector at St. Andrew's Church, North Grafton, Massachusetts from 1896 to 1902, and achieved national importance as a writer and preacher during his 18-year tenure as dean of St. Luke's Cathedral in Portland, Maine from 1902 to 1920. He began duties as rector of St. Mark's Church in Philadelphia, on October 1, 1920, and took a prominent role in the American Anglo-Catholic Congress movement of the next two decades; he was rector of St. Mark's until his death.

Vernon was Chaplain General of the Community of St. Mary from 1918 to 1944.

== Death ==
Vernon died on May 24, 1944 at Episcopal Hospital, now Temple University Hospital, in Philadelphia, from Parkinson's disease. He is buried in the churchyard at St. Luke's in the Germantown section of Philadelphia.

== Bibliography ==
- The Reconciliation of the Schools of Thought (American Church Union, 1911)
- How to Use the Mass: A Paper read at the Anglo-Catholic Congress, New Haven. November 5th, 1923
- A Little Commentary on a Rule of Life (Kenosha, 1926)
- "Address of the Chairman" in The Third Annual Catholic Congress: Addresses and Papers (1927)
- The Light of the Cross, the Illusion of the Irreparable: Addresses on the Seven Last Words from the Cross (1927)
- Crucified: Good Friday Addresses on the Seven Last Words from the Cross (1930)
- The Catholic Congress and the Christian Life (no date)
- Locust Street Letters (1928–1943)
