= All Saints', Wynnewood =

Church in Wynnewood, Pennsylvania, United States

All Saints'
- All Saints' Episcopal Church
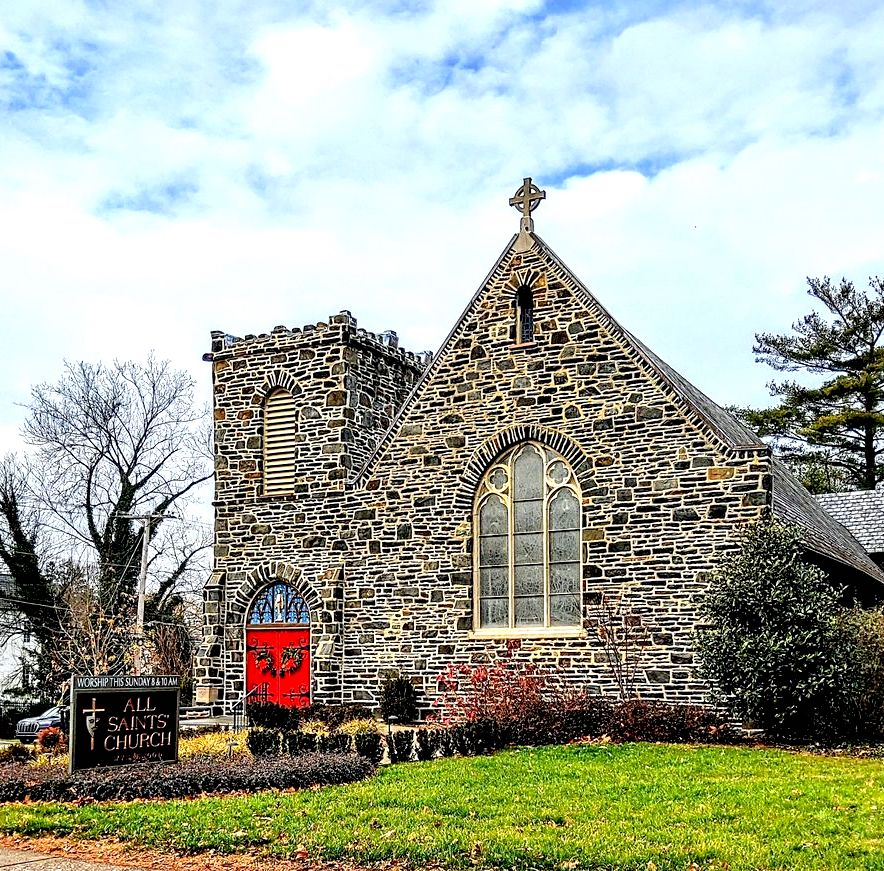

- Location within Pennsylvania Location within the United States
- 40.013530360308316°N 75.27290930670404°W
- Location: 1325 Montgomery Ave. Wynnewood, Pennsylvania 19096
- Country: United States
- Denomination: Episcopal
- Website: www.allsaintswynnewood.org

History
- Founded: 1911
- Dedication: All Saints
- Consecrated: January 31, 1921

Architecture
- Architect(s): George Natress and Son
- Years built: June 1911
- Groundbreaking: October 7, 1911 (cornerstone)

All Saints', Wynnewood is a parish of the Episcopal Diocese of Pennsylvania located in Wynnewood, Montgomery County. In 2024, it reported average attendance of 55 and $408,309 in plate and pledge financial support.

The church's first services as a mission congregation were held in a private house on January 1, 1911, with the laying of a cornerstone on October 7, 1911, by Bishop Thomas J. Garland and first services in the church on December 18, 1911. It was admitted into union with the diocesan convention in 1917. The building was consecrated by Bishop Philip M. Rhinelander on Sexagesima Sunday, January 31, 1921. The building was enlarged significantly in 1921 with additions by the Furness & Evans architectural partnership. A rood and roodscreen were erected in 1925. The current parish house was built in 1955.

The church's organ is by Danish-American builder M. P. Möller (Opus R-910, 1974), previously Skinner Organ Co. (Opus 814, 1929). It has 25 ranks, 1,676 pipes, four divisions, three manuals, 21 stops, and 32 registers. It also previously had a two-manual Bates & Culley organ (1912). A lady chapel was built and consecrated in 1961. The church includes significant stained glass by Nicola D'Ascenzo and Duncan Niles Terry; many of the windows are from the Philadelphia studio of English-born artist Arthur R. Willett. The church also includes work by Philadelphia liturgical artist Davis d'Ambly.

The parish's priest in charge is the Rev. Edward Rix, a graduate of the University of King's College in Nova Scotia. The church uses the 1928 Book of Common Prayer at all services.

Philadelphia Orchestra Vox Ama Deus is in residence in the parish, led by the current parish organist and Choir Master, Dr. Valentin Radu.

== Rectors and clergy ==
- Dr. Andrew Swanton Burke (priest in charge 1911-1918, rector 1918-1919)
- Dr. Gibson Bell (1919-1920, locum tenens, rector 1920–1956)
- Canon John J. Albert (1956-1980)
- Canon Harry E. Krauss, III (1980-1997)
- Thomas L. Monnat (interim, 1997)
- Richard Upsher Smith (1997-2001)
- Edward Rix (interim rector 2001–2013, priest in charge 2013-present)
