= Downtown Churches Historic District =

Historic district in Wisconsin, United States

- U.S. National Register of Historic Places
- U.S. Historic district
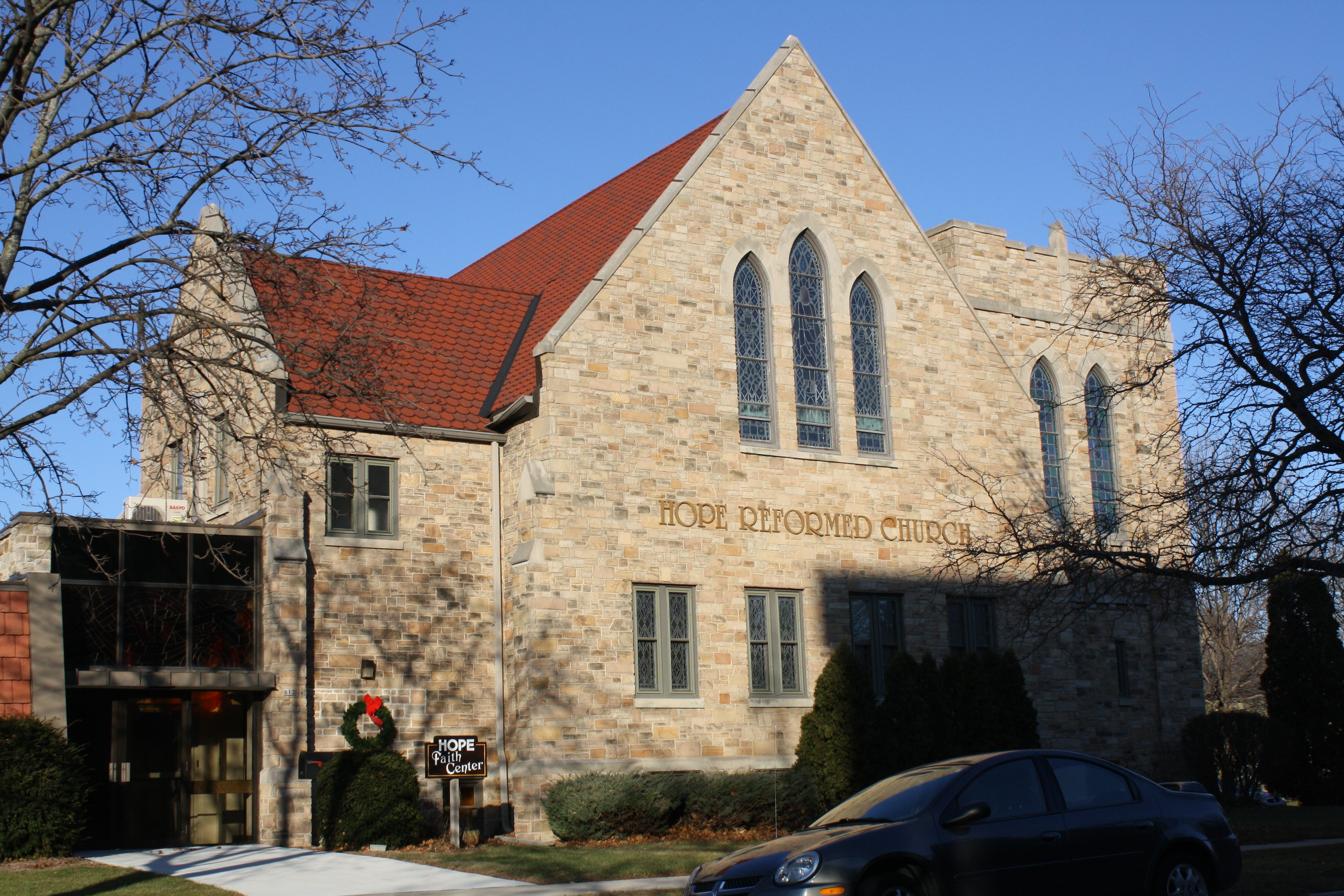
- Hope Reformed Church in the historic district

- Location within Wisconsin Location within the United States
- Location: Generally bounded by Erie Ave., N. 6th St., Ontario Ave., and N. 7th St., Sheboygan, Wisconsin
- Coordinates: 43°45′21″N 87°42′37″W
- Area: 4.4 acres (1.8 ha)
- Built: 1911
- Architect: Stubenrauch, Edgar A.; West, William Russell
- Architectural style: Greek Revival, Gothic Revival, Late Gothic Revival
- NRHP reference No.: 10000052
- Added to NRHP: March 1, 2010

The Downtown Churches Historic District is a historic district in downtown Sheboygan, Wisconsin consisting of four churches and five other buildings associated with the churches. The four churches which comprise the district are Grace Episcopal Church, built in the High Victorian Gothic style in 1871; First Methodist Episcopal Church, built in 1929–30 in the Late Gothic style; Hope Reformed Church, built in 1937 in the Late Gothic style; and St. Martin Lutheran Church, built in 1968 in a contemporary style.

The churches serve as historical examples of a century's worth of religious architecture spanning four different faiths and a variety of styles. In addition, the first Boy Scout troop in Wisconsin was founded in Grace Episcopal Church in 1911. The district was added to the National Register of Historic Places on March 1, 2010.
