= William Elwell =

William Elwell (September 15, 1901 - December 29, 1977) was a prominent American Anglo-Catholic priest who originated devotion to Our Lady of Walsingham in the American Episcopal Church. A native of Sheboygan, Wisconsin, he was ordained to the priesthood on May 22, 1927, after studies at Nashotah House Theological Seminary.

== Life ==
He was appointed rector of Grace Episcopal Church in Sheboygan, Wisconsin in March, 1938 after serving as assistant under the Rev. A. Parker Curtiss since 1929. During his tenure from 1938 to 1955, the name of the church shifted from the standard "Grace Episcopal Church" to a dedication to "Our Lady of Grace." He instituted a Marian pilgrimage and procession in 1951 that is still observed annually as of 2022. Elwell was the only Wisconsin candidate for coadjutor bishop election in the Episcopal Diocese of Fond du Lac, but withdrew in favor of William Hampton Brady who succeeded as diocesan in 1957.

Elwell became rector of S. Clement's Church, Philadelphia in 1955 (instituted Epiphany 1956) and served until Parkinson's disease forced his retirement in 1964. He was a canon of St. Paul's Cathedral, Fond du Lac, Wisconsin and a guardian of the Shrine of Our Lady of Walsingham in Norfolk, England. He was also a prominent member of the American Church Union.

== Death ==
He was buried at Wildwood Cemetery in Sheboygan in the family plot and left no survivors.
