= Grace Episcopal Church (Sheboygan, Wisconsin) =

Historic church in Wisconsin, United States

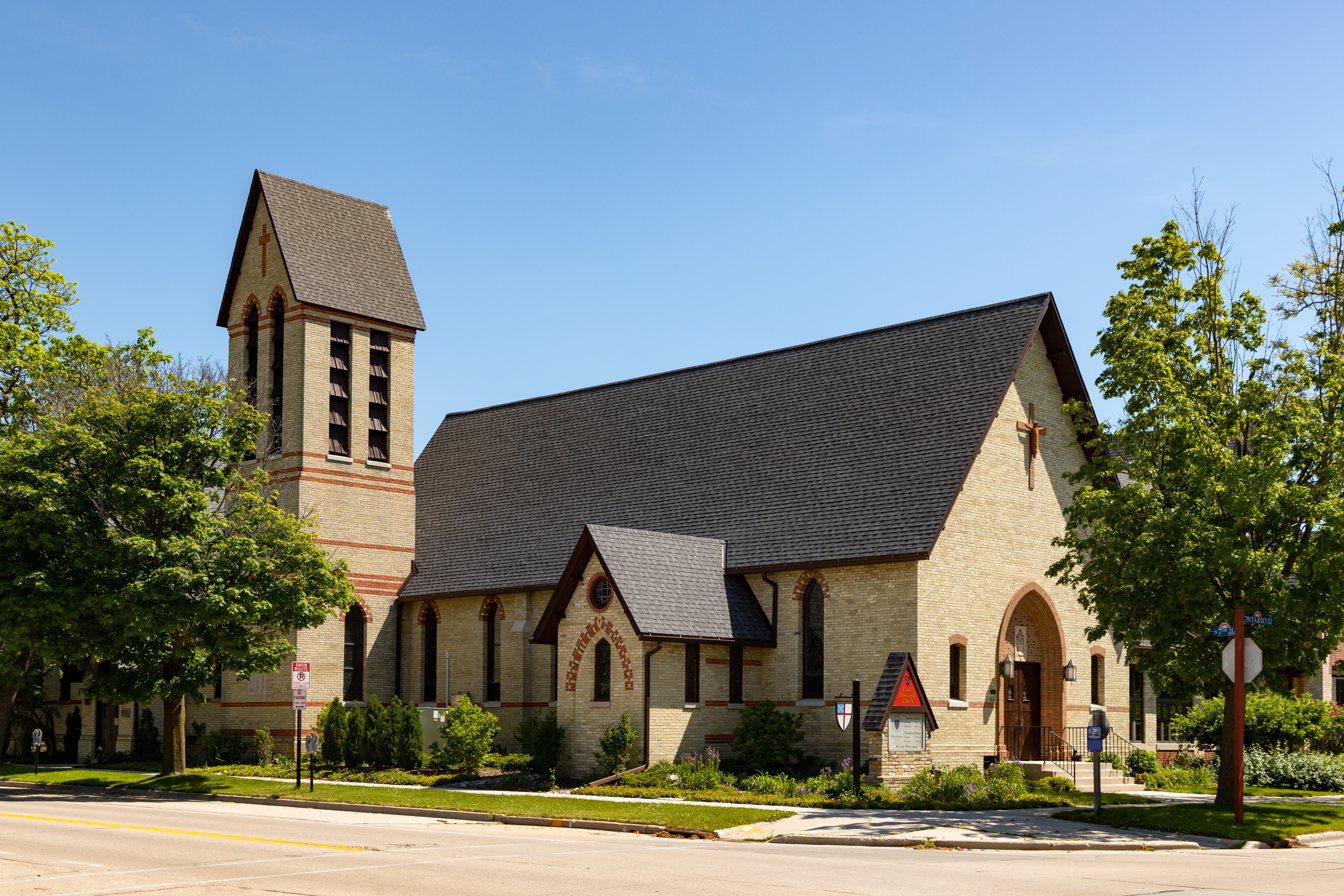
- Grace Episcopal Church, Sheboygan, Wisconsin, 2020.

Religion
- Affiliation: Episcopal, Anglican
- District: Diocese of Fond du Lac
- Province: Province V
- Ecclesiastical or organisational status: Parish church
- Leadership: The Rev. William Bulson

Location
- Location: 1011 North 7th Street, Sheboygan, Wisconsin, United States
- Interactive map of Grace Episcopal Church
- Coordinates: 43.7555°N 87.711°W

Architecture
- Type: Church
- Completed: 1871
- Construction cost: $7,752
- Materials: brick

Website
- Grace Episcopal Church

- Grace Episcopal Church
- U.S. Historic district – Contributing property
- Location: Sheboygan, Wisconsin
- Built: 1871
- Architectural style: High Victorian Gothic
- Part of: Downtown Churches Historic District (ID10000052)
- Designated CP: March 1, 2010

Grace Episcopal Church located at 1011 North 7th Street in Sheboygan, Wisconsin, is an Anglo-Catholic parish of the Episcopal Church, part of the Episcopal Diocese of Wisconsin, formerly Diocese of Fond du Lac. The church reported 202 members in 2015 and 139 members in 2023; no membership statistics were reported nationally in 2024 parochial reports. Plate and pledge income reported for the congregation in 2024 was $266,785. Average Sunday attendance (ASA) in 2024 was 104 persons, down from a reported 123 in 2016.

It is one of four churches comprising the Downtown Churches Historic District that is listed on the National Register of Historic Places.

== History ==
Early in 1847 a small lot was bought in Sheboygan on which a wood-frame church was built. The first service of the new Grace Episcopal Church was held on Christmas Day 1847, and two years later a new church was consecrated by the Rt. Rev. Jackson Kemper, missionary Bishop of the Northwest Territory.

The present church was built in 1871 in High Victorian Gothic style. It was listed on the Wisconsin State Register of Historic Places on July 17, 2009 as part of the Downtown Churches Historic District. The district was listed on the National Register of Historic Places on March 1, 2010.

== Relics ==
Built within the structure of the church are several relics from the Holy Land. Inside the foundation are rocks from the Jordan River, and the chancel arch contains several small stones from Bethlehem. Inside the High Altar are pieces of olive wood from the Garden of Gethsemane, and five stones from under the Church of the Holy Sepulchre in Jerusalem.

== The Shrine of Our Lady of Walsingham ==
The Lady Chapel

The Lady Chapel, on the west side of the transept, is considered to be the National Shrine to Our Lady of Walsingham for the Episcopal Church. It was built in 1930 and consecrated in 1931 during the 1938-1955 tenure of William Elwell as rector. On the altar is the replica of the original statue of Our Lady of Walsingham in Norfolk, England. It is believed to be the first shrine to Our Lady dedicated in any Anglican parish church in the United States. Since 1980 the Lady Chapel has been the object of an annual Walsingham Pilgrimage.

In the middle of the floor is a small wedge-shaped stone brought from Glastonbury, England. The five paintings above the altar represent the Blessed Virgin Mary enthroned, attended by Saint Agnes, St. Cecilia, and Angels. They were painted by T. Noyes Lewis of London.

== Windows ==
The main altar

The stained-glass windows within the church in the nave are the work of a local Milwaukee glass company. Each portrays a different part in the life of Christ. All have been installed since 1968.

== All Saints Chapel ==
In the late 1930s the Rev. A. Parker Curtis began using a room at the Sharpe Resort, to offer Eucharist for Episcopalians on vacation at Elkhart Lake, Wisconsin, during the summer months. Eventually it was decided that a chapel should be built in the area and Grace Church bought a small piece of land. In 1951 the chapel was completed and consecrated.

The chapel is constructed of native fieldstone. A wooden beamed ceiling is used throughout the chapel. The floor is a special slate used all over the area, and is also used in complement with the floor of the Walsingham Shrine in Grace Church.

== See also ==
- William Elwell, son of the parish, curate and rector
