= First Presbyterian Church of the Covenant (Erie, Pennsylvania) =

Coordinates: 42°07′36.7″N 80°05′25.1″W

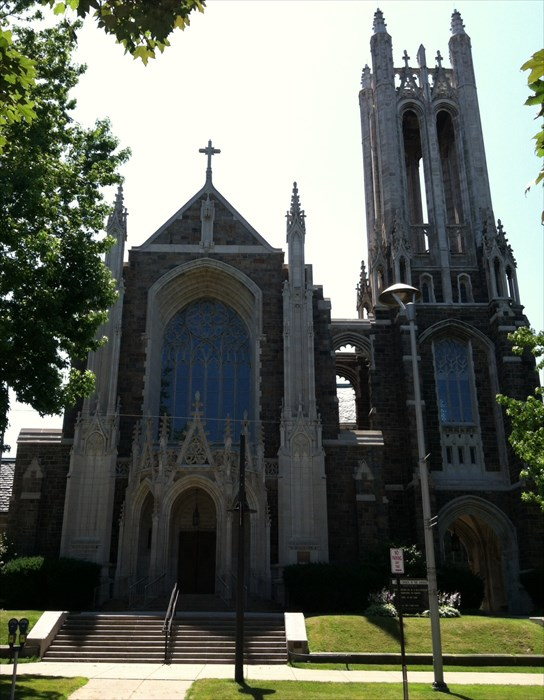
- First Presbyterian Church of the Covenant
- Location: 250 West Seventh Street; Erie, Pennsylvania 16501
- Country: United States
- Denomination: Presbyterian
- Website: https://firstcovenanterie.org/

History
- Founded: February 8, 1929
- Dedicated: December 14, 1930

Architecture
- Architect(s): Corbusier and Foster
- Style: Gothic Revival
- Completed: 1930

First Presbyterian Church of the Covenant is a Presbyterian church in Erie, Pennsylvania.

== History ==
The church was founded in February 1929 when two Presbyterian churches in Erie, PA, Park and Central Presbyterian Churches, merged. The merger was approved by the Presbytery of Lake Erie on February 8, 1929 and construction was begun on a new church building along West Sixth Street in downtown Erie. The cornerstone was laid on June 16, 1929 and the new church building was dedicated on Sunday, December 14, 1930.

== Art and architecture ==
The Church was designed in a Gothic Revival style by the architecture firm of Corbusier and Foster in Cleveland, Ohio. The base of the exterior walls of the church, as well as the trim are limestone. The floor tiles were designed and made by Henry Chapman Mercer of the Moravian Pottery and Tile Works in Doylestown, Pennsylvania. The church and adjacent school building have stained glass windows by Connick Studios of Boston, D'Ascenzo Studios of Philadelphia, and Tiffany Studios of New York. The church's organ was built by Skinner Organ Company.
