= Cathedral of the Air =

Military chapel in New Jersey

Coordinates: 40°01′04.3″N 74°18′37.45″W

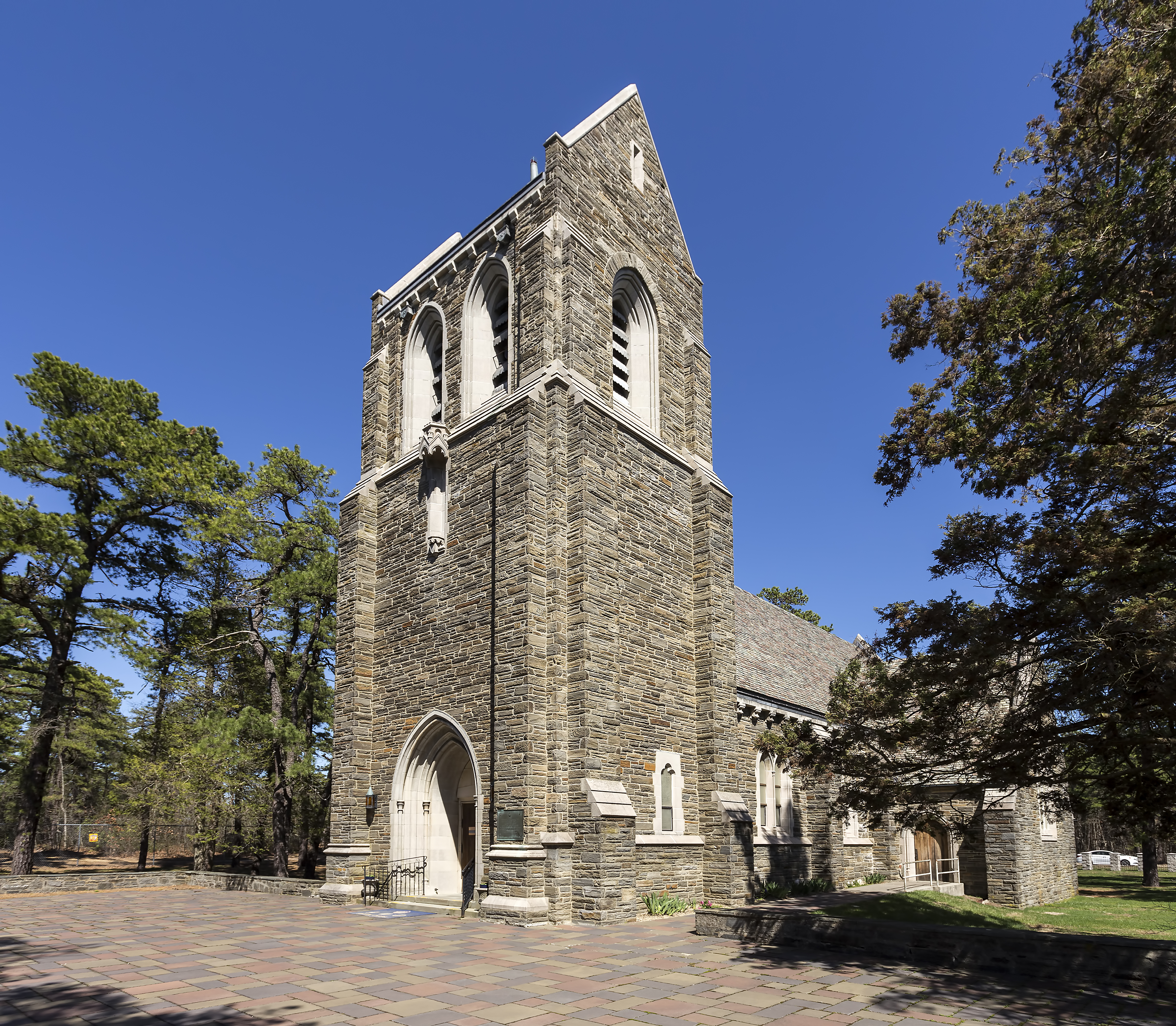
The Cathedral of the Air in 2016

The Cathedral of the Air is a 20th-century Norman-Gothic style military chapel in Manchester Township, New Jersey, United States. It was conceived by the Reverend Gill Robb Wilson, one-time national chaplain of the American Legion, and is intended to serve the military personnel serving at the Joint Base McGuire–Dix–Lakehurst. The chapel features stained glass windows with aviation motifs, and plaques memorializing the loss of naval airships USS Akron and USS Shenandoah. Both airships had been based at the nearby Lakehurst Naval Air Station.

Originally used primarily as a Roman Catholic church, it no longer holds regular services and is used as a non-denominational location for weddings, baptisms and funerals.
