= Church of St. James the Greater (Bristol, Pennsylvania) =

Coordinates: 40.09711°N 74.85368°W

The Church of St. James the Greater is an Episcopal church located in the heart of the Bristol Historic District in Bristol Borough, Pennsylvania. It is part of the Episcopal Diocese of Pennsylvania and the Episcopal Church in the United States of America. The church reported 100 members in 2020 and 66 members in 2023; no membership statistics were reported in 2024 parochial reports. Plate and pledge income reported for the congregation in 2024 was $42,461. Average Sunday attendance (ASA) in 2024 was 31 persons.

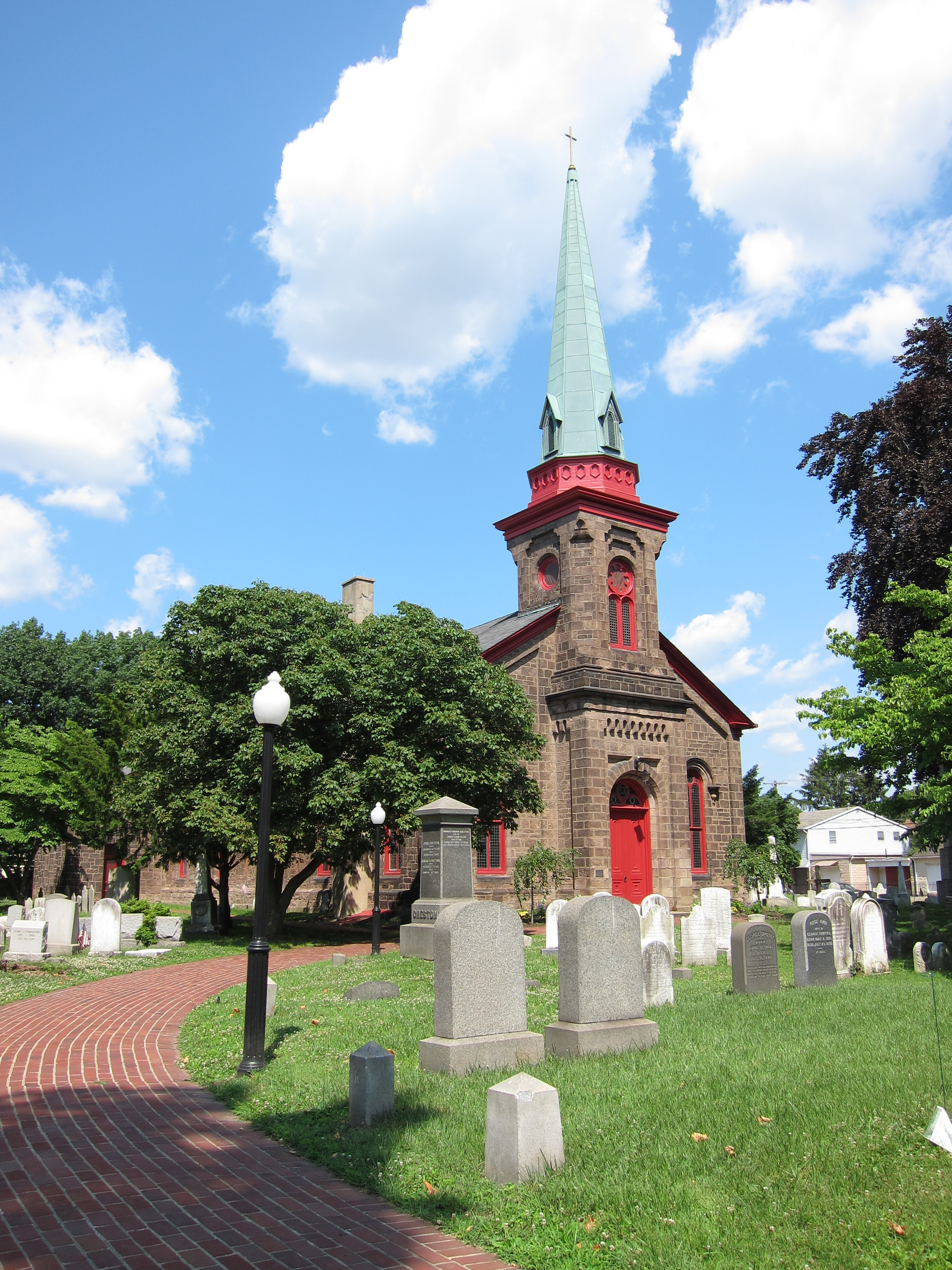
Church of St. James the Greater, Bristol, Pennsylvania.

== Early history ==
In 1702, the Society for the Propagation of the Gospel in Foreign Parts (SPG) sent George Keith to America to promote Anglican worship in the colonies. Keith, a former Quaker who had become convinced that the Society of Friends was drifting too far from orthodox Christian belief, had left the Philadelphia area a few years earlier and returned to England, where he connected with the Church of England, began to study for the priesthood, and was ordained by Henry Compton, the bishop of London. He was joined in his missionary efforts in the colonies by John Talbot, the chaplain of the H.M.S. Centurion, the ship on which Keith sailed from England.

The two men traveled to Burlington, then part of the province of West Jersey (now part of the state of New Jersey), and Talbot remained there. He became the first rector of St. Mary's Church in Burlington, and he also preached to a small group of Anglicans in Bristol on Sunday afternoons, crossing the Delaware River by rowboat. Under the leadership of John Rowland and Anthony Burton, that group began in 1712 to build a church in Bristol on land donated by Burton, who also later gave the land now occupied by St. James’ historic cemetery. The church was dedicated to St. James the Greater and consecrated in July 1712. The congregation continued to be served by Talbot until his death in 1727.

St. James was the first church in Bristol (the third-oldest town in Pennsylvania after Philadelphia and Chester) and the only Episcopal church in Bucks County, Pennsylvania, for 119 years. Under the leadership of the Rev. George W. Ridgely (rector from 1830–1832), St. James helped establish mission churches at Hulmeville (Grace) and Newtown (St. Luke's).

The parish flourished until anti-British feeling in the 1770s made it an unpopular place (the Episcopal Church did not yet exist, and St. James was still part of the Church of England). The church was abandoned by clergy and members, vandalized and left as a shell of a building, and used by American troops for stabling horses during the American Revolutionary War. After the war, the little church eventually was restored and expanded.

In 1784, representatives from St. James joined members of nine other colonial parishes in establishing the Episcopal Diocese of Pennsylvania and, two years later, in electing the first Bishop of Pennsylvania, the Rt. Rev. William White. The original church was torn down in 1856, and the present building, designed by Philadelphia architect Samuel Sloan, was built in 1857 at a cost of $13,000.

== Church interior ==
=== Narthex floor ===
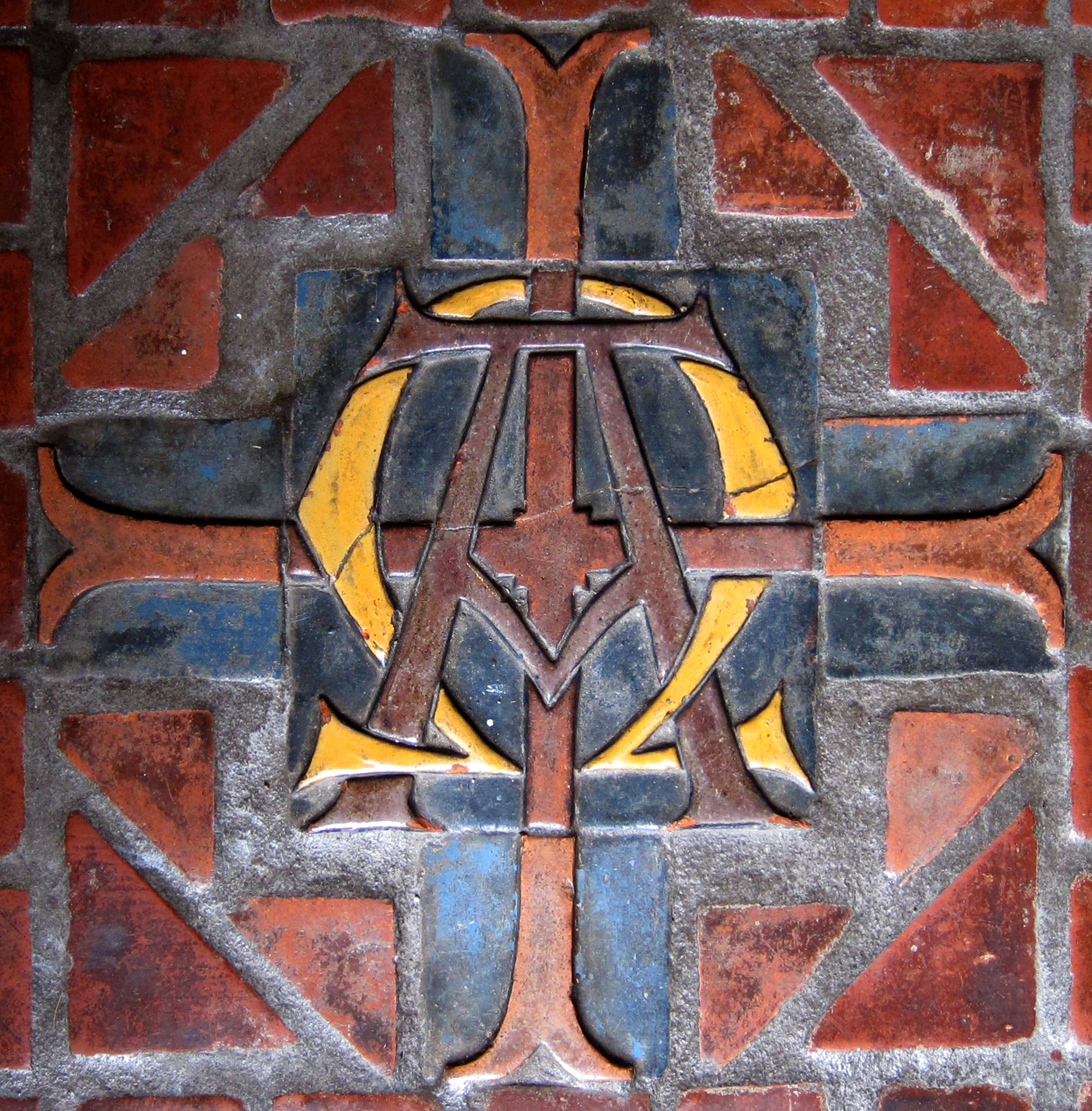
Alpha and Omega floor tile at the Church of St. James the Greater in Bristol, Pennsylvania; it was baked at Moravian Tile Works in Doylestown, Pennsylvania.

The floor design was selected by Ellwood F. DeLong of Philadelphia. It is made of ceramic tile patterned on very old composition and styling. The decorative pieces were made from handmade molds and then baked at the Moravian Tile Works in Doylestown, Pennsylvania.

Immediately inside the front doors are the letters S and J for Saint James. The large symbol in the center contains the first and last letters of the Greek alphabet, Alpha and Omega, signifying that God is the beginning and the end of all things.

Four nearby symbols represent the four Gospel writers, Matthew, Mark, Luke, and John, with their names spelled in Latin. The winged creature with a man's face represents Matthew, whose gospel traces Jesus’ human genealogy. The creature with a lion's face is the symbol for Mark, whose gospel begins with “The voice of one crying in the wilderness,” suggesting the roar of a lion. Luke's symbol is the oxen, the animal of sacrifice, as Luke stressed the atoning sacrifice of Jesus. John's emblem is the high soaring eagle, reflecting John's lofty and “soaring” gospel, which is far richer theologically than the others.

At the entrance to the left inside door is a Greek cross with the Greek monograms for Jesus (IC) and Christ (XC), and the word “Nika”, meaning “conquers”. Thus: “Jesus Christ conquers”. At the entrance to the right inside door is an alternate monogram for Christ's name, XP, flanked by the Alpha and Omega.

=== Windows ===
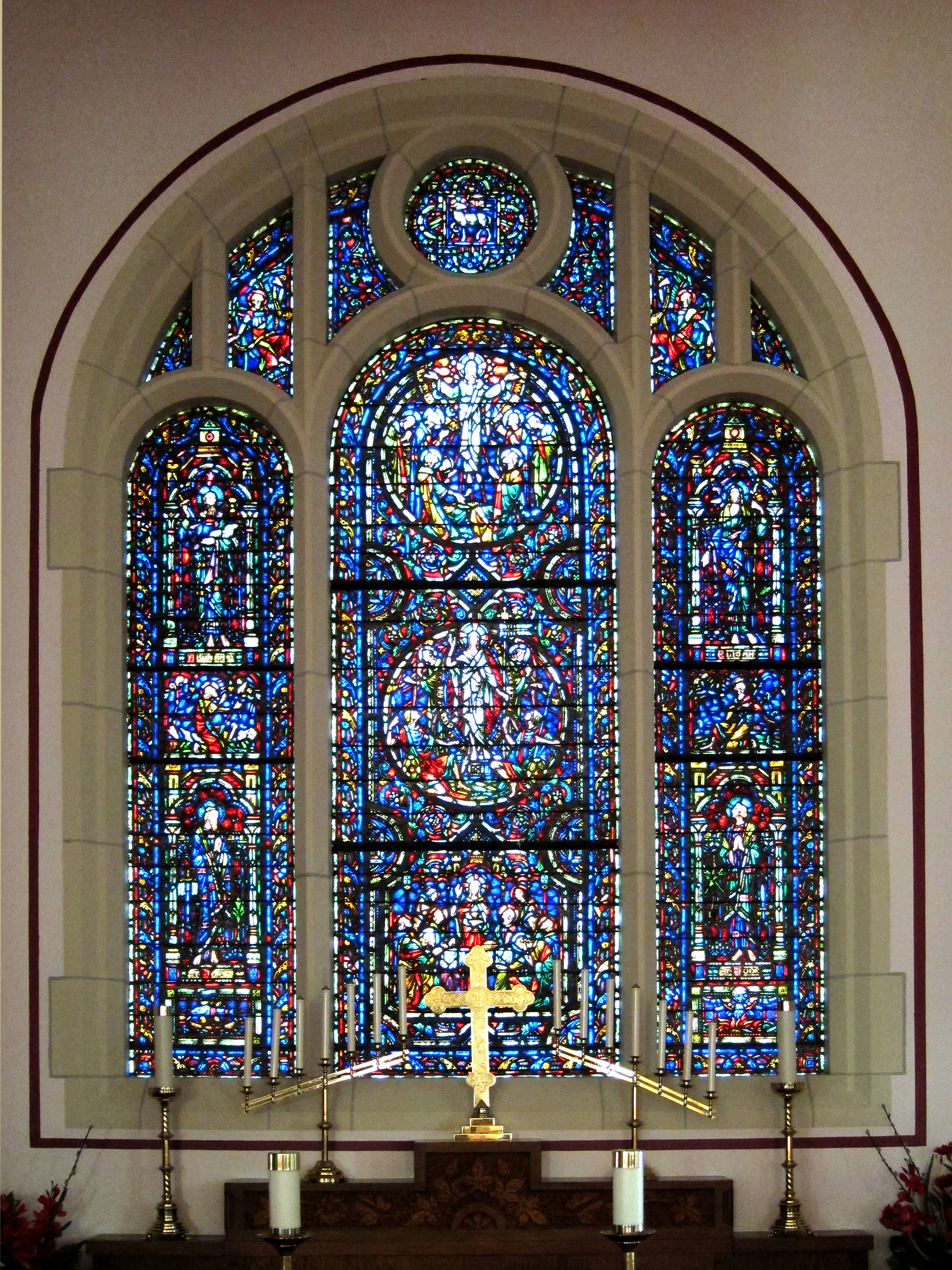
Dorrance window.

The side stained-glass windows were installed for the opening of the church in 1857. The large stained glass window in the chancel was commissioned through a donation from the Dorrance family and installed in 1924. It was designed by the great stained-glass artist Nicholas D’Ascenzo, and for it he earned the Gold Medal of the Architectural League of New York in 1925.

== Parish house ==
At the outbreak of the Civil War in 1861, the women of the parish formed the Ladies Church Aid Society for “the collection of clothing and delicacies for the soldiers at the front.” Augmented by women from other churches, the Society produced an enormous amount of underclothes, sent mostly to the U.S. Hospital at Point Lookout, Maryland, whose chief surgeon was a former Bristolian. Martha Burnet Landreth headed the Society. The organization continued after the war and provided the funds to build the Parish House in 1877, replicating the architectural style of the church and using the same materials, at a cost of nearly $12,000.

== Cemetery ==
The churchyard is almost as old as Bristol, and the cemetery is one of the oldest in Bucks County. Family plots and stones carry many names that are significant in the history of the greater Philadelphia area and the Episcopal Church. The cemetery also contains at least eleven American Revolutionary War veterans and forty American Civil War veterans, including several who were killed in action during that war.

- George (1784–1869) and Catharine Breck (1789–1864), parents of two notable figures in the Episcopal Church: the Rev. James Lloyd Breck, the so-called “Apostle of the Wilderness” who evangelized from Pennsylvania to California and founded two Episcopal seminaries, Nashotah House and Seabury Divinity School, and the Rev. Dr. Charles Breck, longtime rector of St. John's Church in Wilmington, Delaware
- Thomas Apthorpe Cooper (1776–1849), one of the first American Shakespearean actors
- John Dorrance (1830–1869), the contractor responsible for digging the Delaware Canal and grandfather of John Thompson Dorrance (1873–1930), who was president of the Campbell's from 1914 to 1930
- George Gillespie (1671–1721), whose stone is the oldest that is still partly legible, the grandfather of the Rt. Rev. George de Normandie Gillespie (1819–1909), first Bishop of the Episcopal Diocese of Western Michigan
- Joseph McIlvaine (1719–1787), colonel and commanding officer of the Fifth Battalion of Pennsylvania Militia in the Revolutionary War and father of Joseph McIlvaine, United States Senator from New Jersey (1769–1826) and grandfather of the Rt. Rev. Charles Pettit McIlvaine (1799–1873), second bishop of the Episcopal Diocese of Ohio
- William Rodman (1757–1824), who served in the Revolutionary War as a private and subsequently as brigade quartermaster, and later served in the United States House of Representatives

== Today ==
The Church of St. James the Greater continues to be an active parish sponsoring a variety of ministries, including a Sunday School, a monthly dinner for those in need, and weekly collections of food for a local food pantry. The Holy Eucharist, Rite II, is celebrated Sundays at 8:30 a.m.
