= St. Mark's Episcopal Church (Philadelphia) =

Historic church in Pennsylvania, US

Coordinates: 39°56′56″N 75°10′7″W

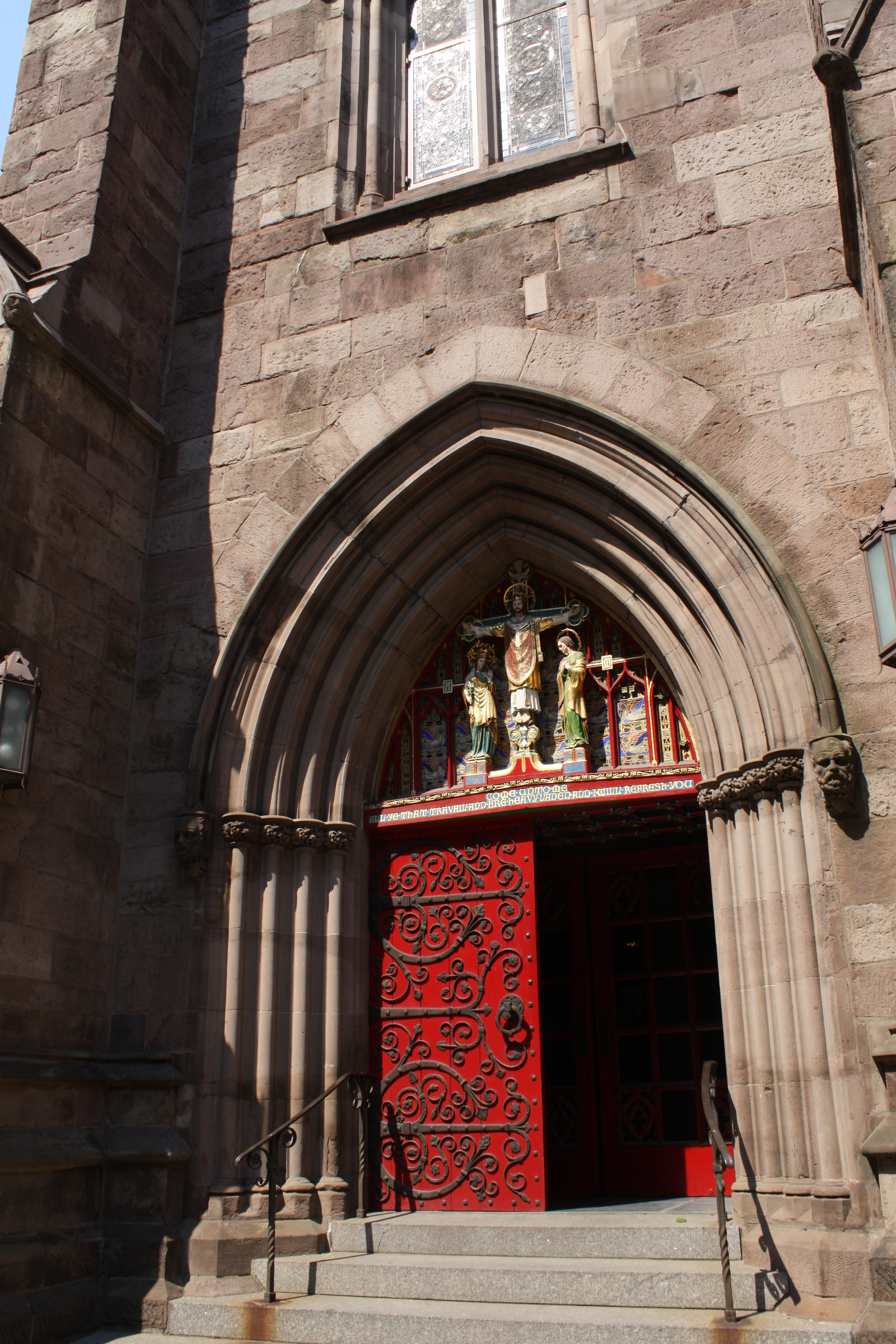
- St. Mark's Episcopal Church in 2010
- St. Mark's Episcopal Church
- Location: Rittenhouse, Philadelphia, Pennsylvania
- Address: 1625 Locust Street
- Country: United States
- Denomination: Episcopal Church
- Churchmanship: Anglo-Catholic
- Website: saintmarksphiladelphia.org

History
- Status: Parish church
- Founded: 1847
- Dedication: Mark the Evangelist

Architecture
- Architects: John Notman; Cope and Stewardson
- Style: Gothic Revival
- Years built: 1848–1849

Specifications
- Capacity: Approx. 400 (nave)

Administration
- Diocese: Pennsylvania

Clergy
- Rector: Blake Sawicky
- St. Mark's Episcopal Church
- U.S. National Register of Historic Places
- U.S. National Historic Landmark
- NRHP reference No.: 82003815

Significant dates
- Added to NRHP: April 19, 1982
- Designated NHL: February 4, 1985

Saint Mark's Episcopal Church is an Episcopal church located at 1625 Locust Street in Rittenhouse Square in Center City Philadelphia. The church was founded in the mid-19th century as part of the Oxford Movement revival in the Anglican Communion. Because of its architectural quality and significance, the building was designated a National Historic Landmark in 1984. It is a parish of the Episcopal Diocese of Pennsylvania.

== Congregation ==
The parish reported 523 members in 2025. Average Sunday Attendance (ASA) reported in 2025 was 241 persons, a figure almost unchanged since 2023.

In the summer of 2008, the Standing Committee of the Episcopal Diocese of Pennsylvania allowed Saint Mark's to adopt the Church of St. James the Less as a mission. A middle school was opened on the property in September 2011.

The church maintains a daily Mass schedule, and runs a food cupboard and soup kitchen.

Notable former organists and choirmasters at St. Mark's include Wesley A. Day, Donald Nally, Scott Dettra, Diane Meredith Belcher, Matthew Glandorf, and Robert McCormick.

== Building history ==
=== 19th century ===
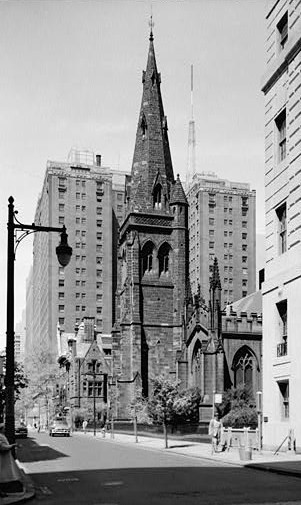
St. Mark's Episcopal Church in 1958

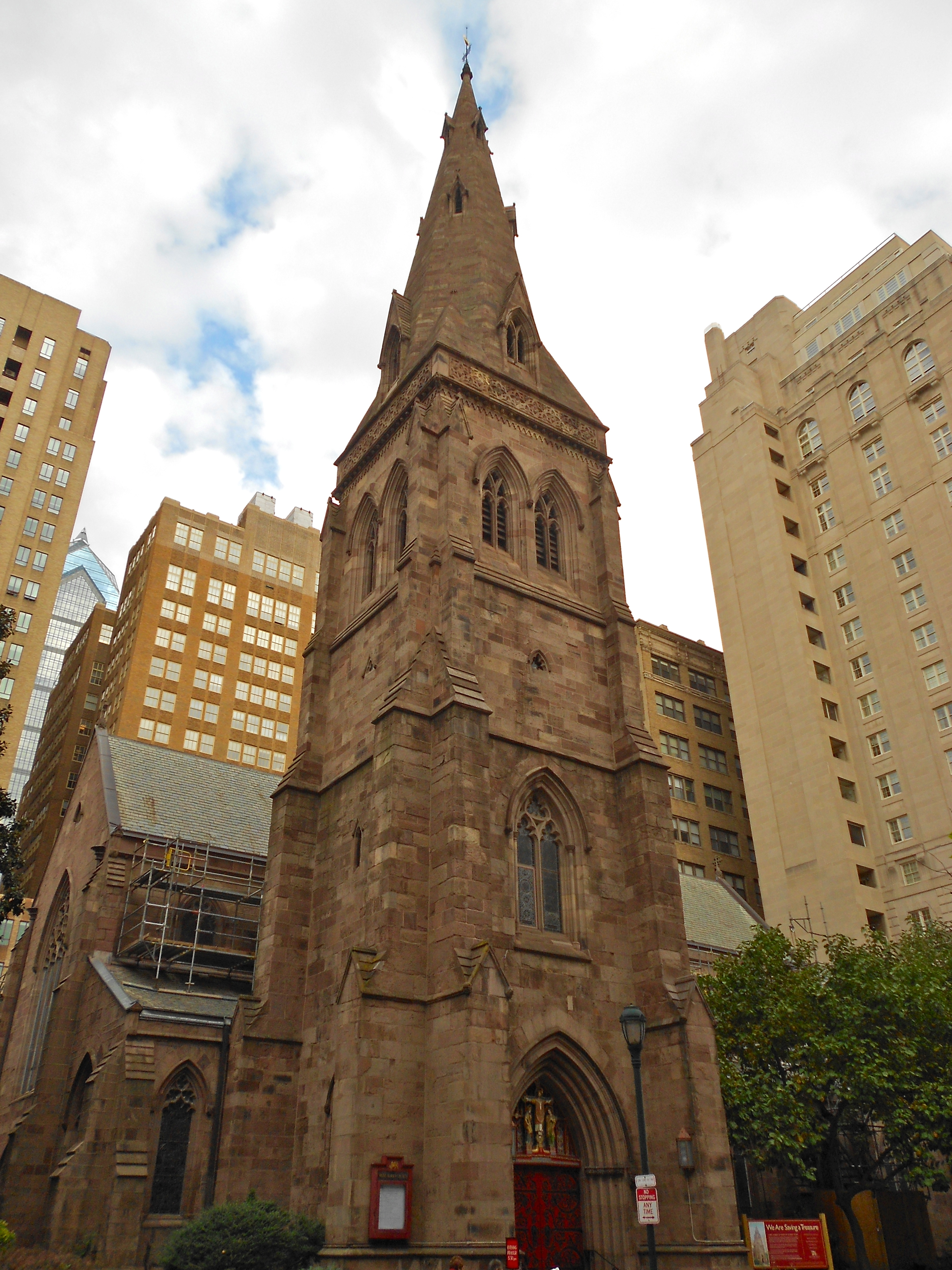
The steeple of St. Mark's in October 2014

The building was constructed by John Notman in the Gothic Revival style between 1847 and 1849, based on an original design by English architect Richard Cromwell Carpenter. The tower was designed by Notman, and completed in 1865 by George Hewitt.

=== 20th century ===
The main entrance, with polychromed figurers depicting "Christ in Majesty", are part of the portal designed by Milton Bennett Medary of the Zantzinger, Borie, and Medary firm in 1923.

The Lady Chapel was designed by Cope and Stewardson in the late decorated Gothic style. It was built in 1900; the ceiling is the first known example in the US of a stone vault. Both construction of the chapel and its furnishings were donated by Rodman Wanamaker in memory of his late wife.

The church contains several ornaments by Charles Eamer Kempe; the Lady Chapel was originally decorated entirely according to Kempe's designs. When it was later redecorated, the altar was moved to the head of the north aisle to become the St. John's Altar. The polychromed figures were moved throughout the church, while the original stained glass remains in place.

The church also has several Kempe frontals, representing a significant proportion of the surviving embroideries from that firm, some of which are still in occasional use. The Lady Chapel now contains a world-renowned silver altar with nearly 150 individually sculpted saints and scenes from the life of the Virgin Mary. It is humorously said of this altar that it is "The only place where one can worship both God and Mammon at the same time."

The tower is one of about 50 in North America hung for change ringing, with a ring of eight bells. The bells, which were cast by the Whitechapel Bell Foundry in London in 1876 and 1878, were restored for change-ringing in 1999.

The Aeolian-Skinner pipe organ, op. 948 (built 1936-1937) at the front of the church was designed and voiced by G. Donald Harrison. It is an early example of Harrison's American Classic style. The church also contains a string organ given by Rodman Wanamaker and installed by Wanamaker Organ. The screen organ, which resides in a carved case situated between the Choir and Lady Chapel, dates from the 1902 Austin organ, which was voiced by British organ builder Carleton Michell.

=== 21st century ===
In 2004, the Organ Historical Society rescinded its 1982 historical organ citation after the organ was expanded with digital voices and a new console built by Cornel Zimmer Organ Builders.

During 2017 and 2018, the digital and all of the Zimmer pipe additions (except for the Trompette-en-chamade) in the rear gallery were removed and replaced with vintage Aeolian-Skinner pipework, chiefly from the 1956 organ of St. Thomas Church, Fifth Avenue, New York.

== Clergy ==
- Joseph Pere Bell Wilmer (1849–1861)
- Edward Abiel Washburn (1862–1865)
- Walter Mitchell (1866–1868)
- Eugene Augustus Hoffman (1869–1879)
- Isaac Lea Nicholson (1879–1891)
- Alfred Garnett Mortimer (1891–1912)
- Elliot White (1913–1920)
- Frank Lawrence Vernon (1920–1944)
- William H. Dunphy (1944–1951)
- Emmett Parker Paige (1951–1971)
- Michael Becker (1971–1981)
- Charles Owen Moore (1982–1995)
- Marie Swayze (interim rector, 1996–1997)
- Richard C. Alton (1997–2005)
  - Sean E. Mullen (2002–2006)
- Sean E. Mullen (2006–2024)
  - Paul Francke (2007–2008)
  - Andrew Ashcroft (2008–2010)
  - Erika L. Takacs (2011–2018)
  - Nora Johnson (2013–present)
  - Kyle Babin (2019–2021)
  - Brittany Bjurstrom Frazier (2021–2023)
  - Meghan Mazur (2024)
- David Cobb (interim rector, 2024–2026)
  - Lucy Ann Dure (2024–2026)
- Blake Sawicky (2026–Present)

== See also ==
- List of National Historic Landmarks in Philadelphia
- National Register of Historic Places listings in Center City, Philadelphia
