= Loren N. Gavitt =

Loren Nichols Gavitt (February 13, 1900 – March 23, 1972) was a notable American Anglo-Catholic liturgist in the Episcopal Church during the twentieth century. His devotional manual St. Augustine's Prayer Book has been in print continuously since 1947.

Born in Westerly, Rhode Island, Gavitt was graduated from the General Theological Seminary and ordained to the priesthood in 1927 by the Right Reverend Thomas J. Garland of the Episcopal Diocese of Pennsylvania. He served a curacy at S. Clement's Church, Philadelphia before becoming rector of Grace Church, Albany in 1933. Grace Church merged with the Church of the Holy Innocents in 1951, and Gavitt remained rector of the new parish until 1969. He was an oblate of the Order of the Holy Cross as well as a member of the Confraternity of the Blessed Sacrament, the Guild of All Souls, and the American Church Union. He was a canon of the Cathedral of All Saints, Albany.

Gavitt died at St. Peter's Hospital in Albany and is buried at River Bend Cemetery in Westerly, Rhode Island.

== Works ==
- Saint Augustine's Prayer Book: A Book of Devotion for Members of the Episcopal Church (1947, 1949, 1950, 1952, 1953, 1954, 1956, 1957, 1959, 1961, 1962, 1963, 1964, 1967, 1978, 1991)
- Our Offering: Some Notes on the Liturgy (Holy Cross Press, 1949)
- "What Do Catholics Want in Prayer Book Revision?" The American Church Quarterly (1963), pp. 83-118.
- Short Lessons in the Apostles' Creed (1965)
- Three Catechisms (Holy Cross Press)
