= Samuel Yellin =

American blacksmith and designer (1884–1940)

- Born: 1884; Mohyliv-Podilskyi, Russian Empire (now Ukraine)
- Died: 1940 (aged 55–56)
- Education: Pennsylvania Museum School of Industrial Art
- Known for: Master blacksmith, metal designer

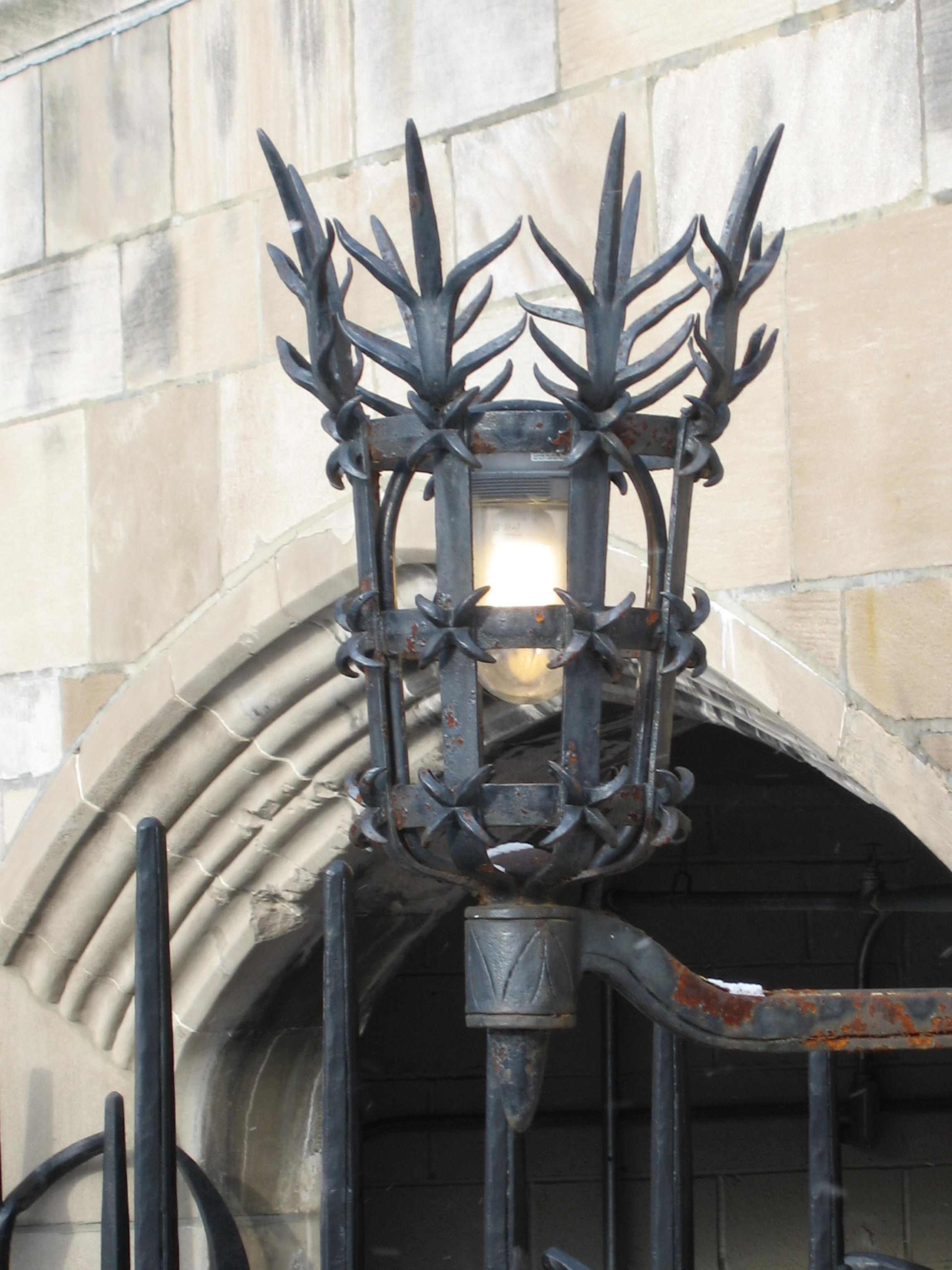
A Samuel Yellin lamp at the Cathedral of Learning in Pittsburgh, Pennsylvania

Samuel Yellin (1884–1940) was an American master blacksmith and metal designer.

== Early life and education ==
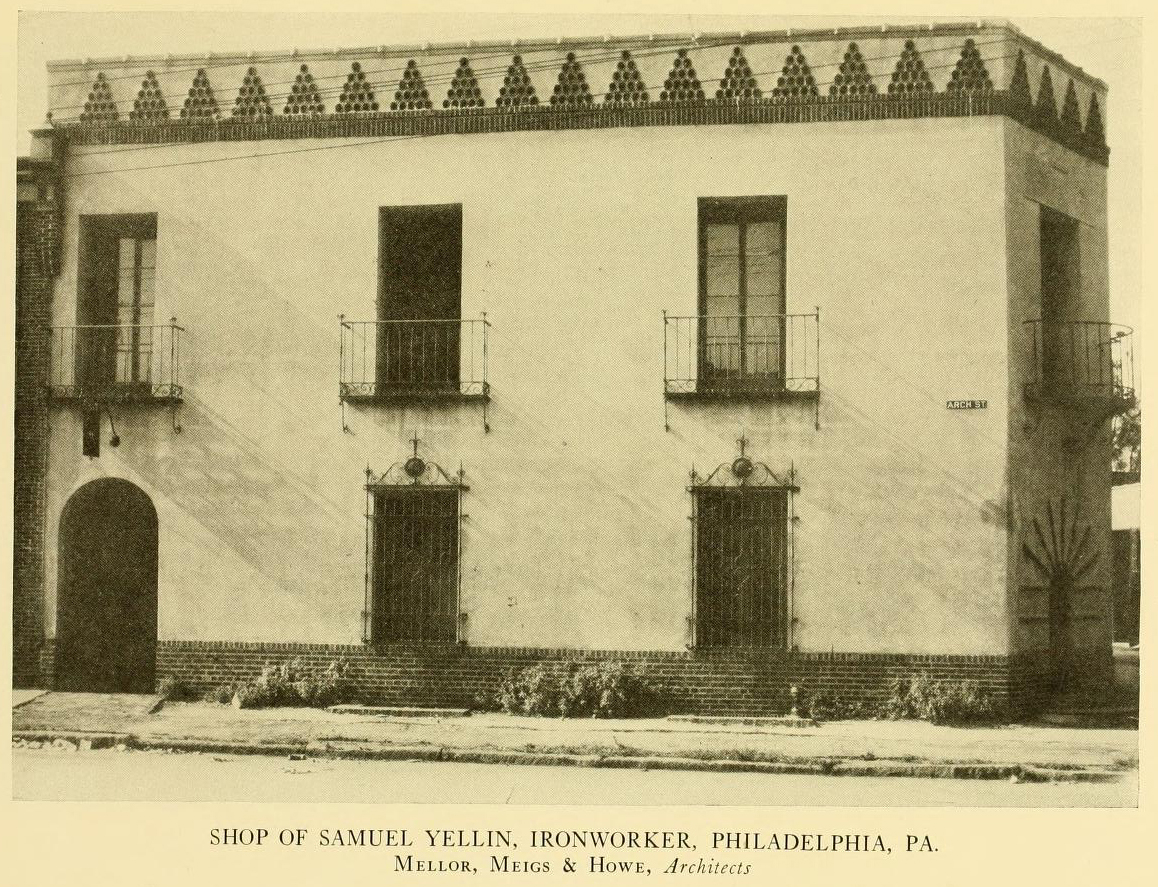
Yellin Studio in 1915

Samuel Yellin was born to a Jewish family in Mohyliv-Podilskyi (currently Ukraine) in the Russian Empire in 1884. At the age of eleven, he was apprenticed to a master ironsmith. In 1900, at the age of sixteen, he completed his apprenticeship. Shortly afterwards he left Ukraine and traveled through Europe. In about 1905, he arrived in Philadelphia, in the United States, where his mother and two sisters were already living. His brother arrived in Philadelphia at about the same time. In early 1906, Yellin took classes at the Pennsylvania Museum School of Industrial Art and within several months was teaching classes there, a position he maintained until 1919.

== Career ==
In 1909, Yellin opened his own metalsmith shop. In 1915, the firm of Mellor, Meigs & Howe, for whom he designed and created many commissions, designed a new studio for Samuel Yellin Metalworkers at 5520 Arch Street in Philadelphia. Yellin died in 1940, but the firm remained there for decades under the direction of Yellin's son, Harvey. Following Harvey's death, the business moved forward under the ownership and guidance of Samuel Yellin's granddaughter, Clare Yellin. The firm has now been in operation for over 110 years as of this writing (2022).

During the building boom of the 1920s, Samuel Yellin Metalworkers employed as many as 250 workers, many of them European artisans. Although Yellin was highly knowledgeable about traditional craftsmanship and design, he also championed creativity and the development of new designs. Samuel Yellin's works can be found in some of the finest buildings in America.

=== Honors ===
Yellin received awards from the Art Institute of Chicago (1919), the American Institute of Architects (1920), the Architectural League of New York (1922), and the Bok Civic Award from the City of Philadelphia (1925). He was a member of the Philadelphia Chapter of the American Institute of Architects and the T Square Club, the Philadelphia Sketch Club, and the Architectural League of New York.

=== Selected works ===
==== Universities, colleges and schools ====
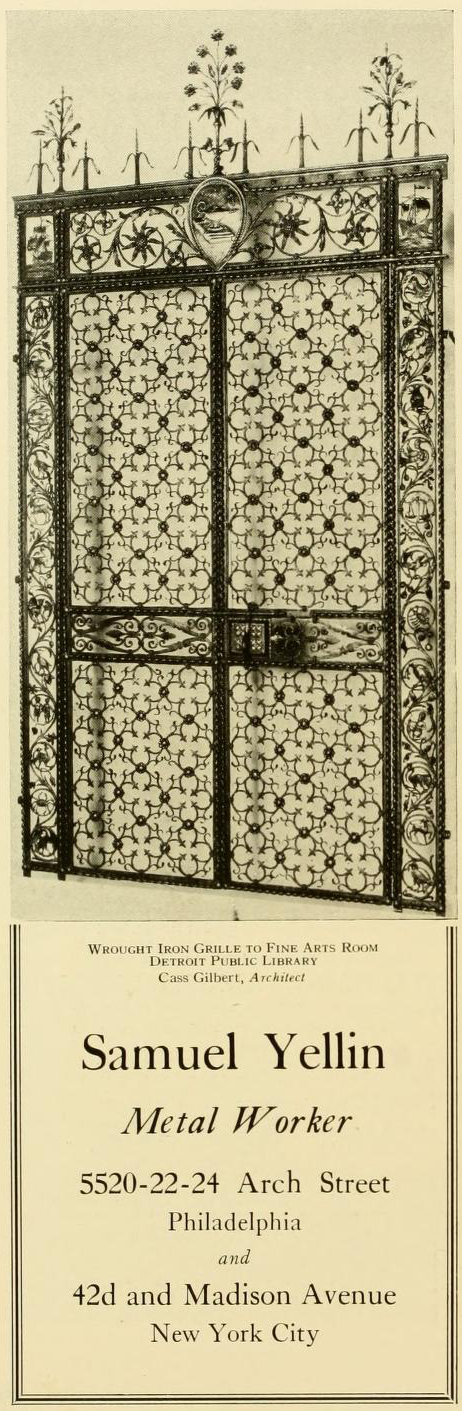
1922 advertisement.

- Annapolis Colored High School, Annapolis, Maryland
- Bowdoin College
- Bryn Mawr College
- California Institute of Technology, Pasadena, California
- Dominican Academy, New York, New York
- Drexel Institute, Philadelphia, Pennsylvania
- Eastman School of Music, Rochester, New York
- Harvard University, Cambridge, Massachusetts
- Haverford College
- Jewish Theological Seminary, New York, New York
- Oberlin College, Oberlin, Ohio
  - Allen Memorial Art Museum
  - Cox Administration Building
- Princeton University, Princeton, New Jersey
- Swarthmore College
- University of Chicago, Chicago, Illinois
- University of Michigan, Ann Arbor, Michigan
- University of Pennsylvania, Philadelphia, Pennsylvania
- University of Pittsburgh, Pittsburgh, Pennsylvania
  - Cathedral of Learning
  - Heinz Chapel
  - Stephen Foster Memorial
- University of Texas at Austin, Austin, Texas
- University of Tulsa, Tulsa, Oklahoma
- University of Virginia, Charlottesville, Virginia
- Vanderbilt University, Nashville, Tennessee
- Yale University, New Haven, Connecticut
  - Harkness Tower (gates)
  - Swartwout Building, Yale University Art Gallery
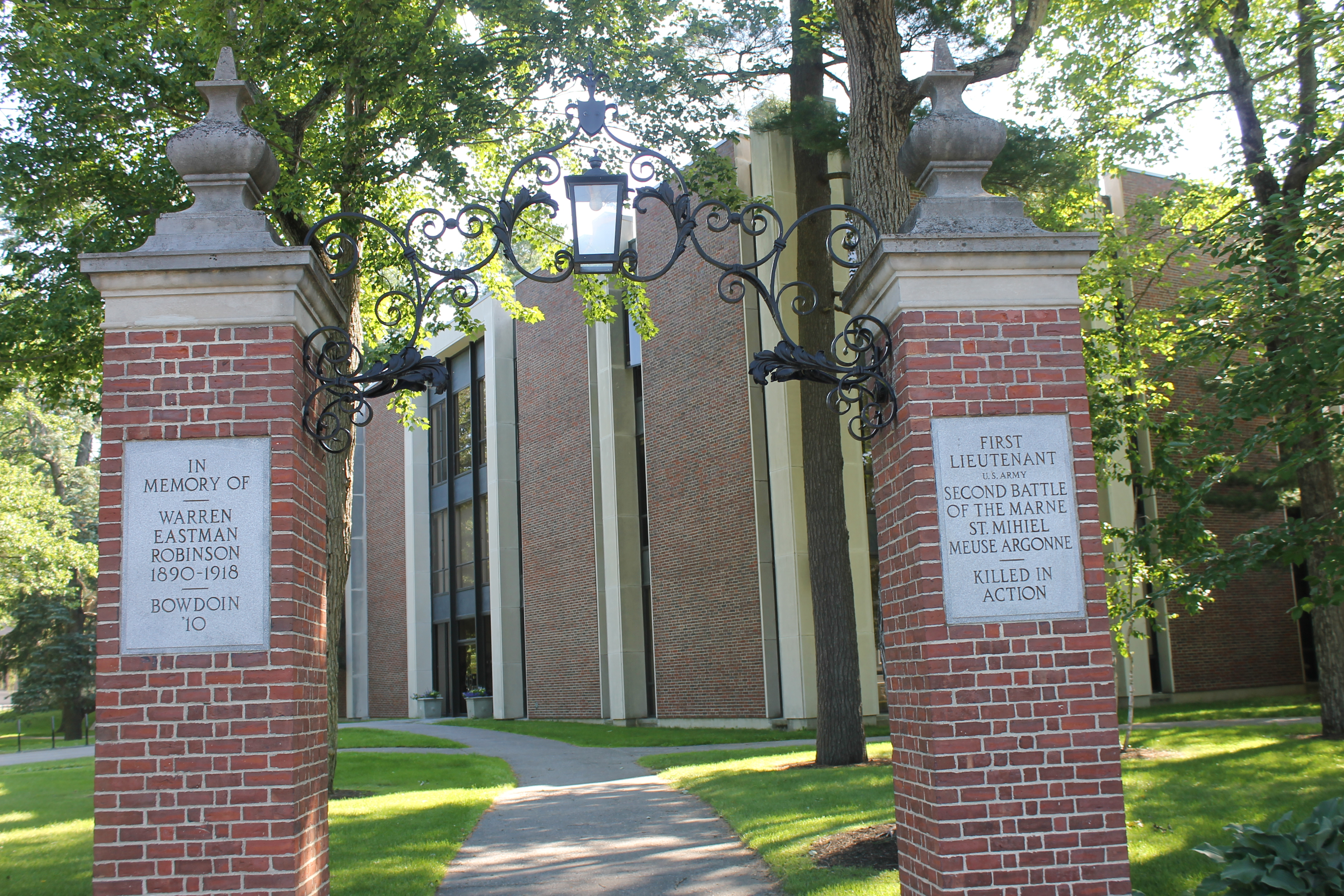
Robinson Memorial Gateway (1922–23), Bowdoin College

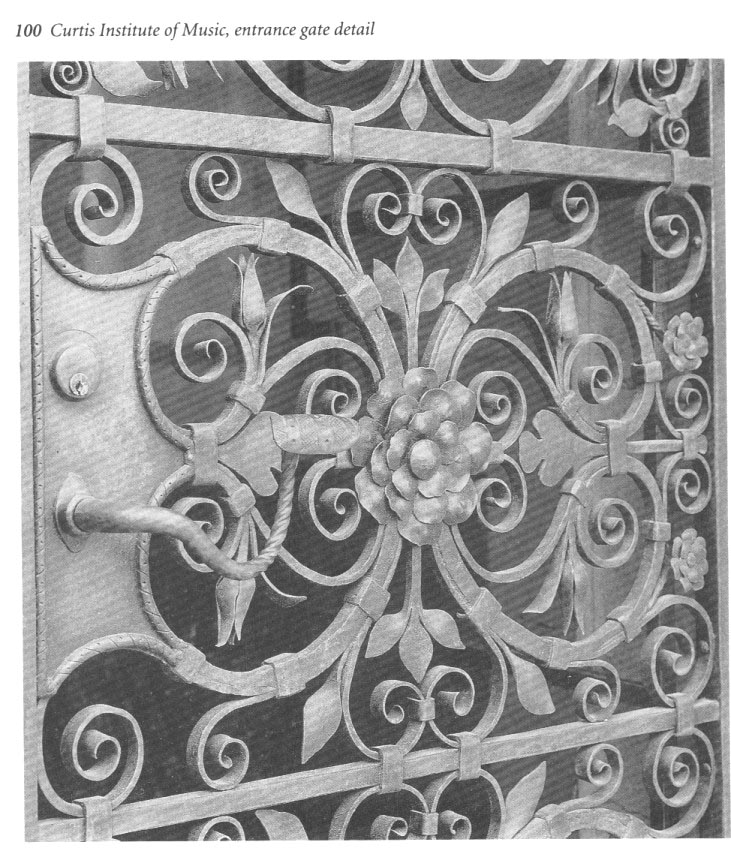
Entrance gates (1924), Curtis Institute of Music, Philadelphia

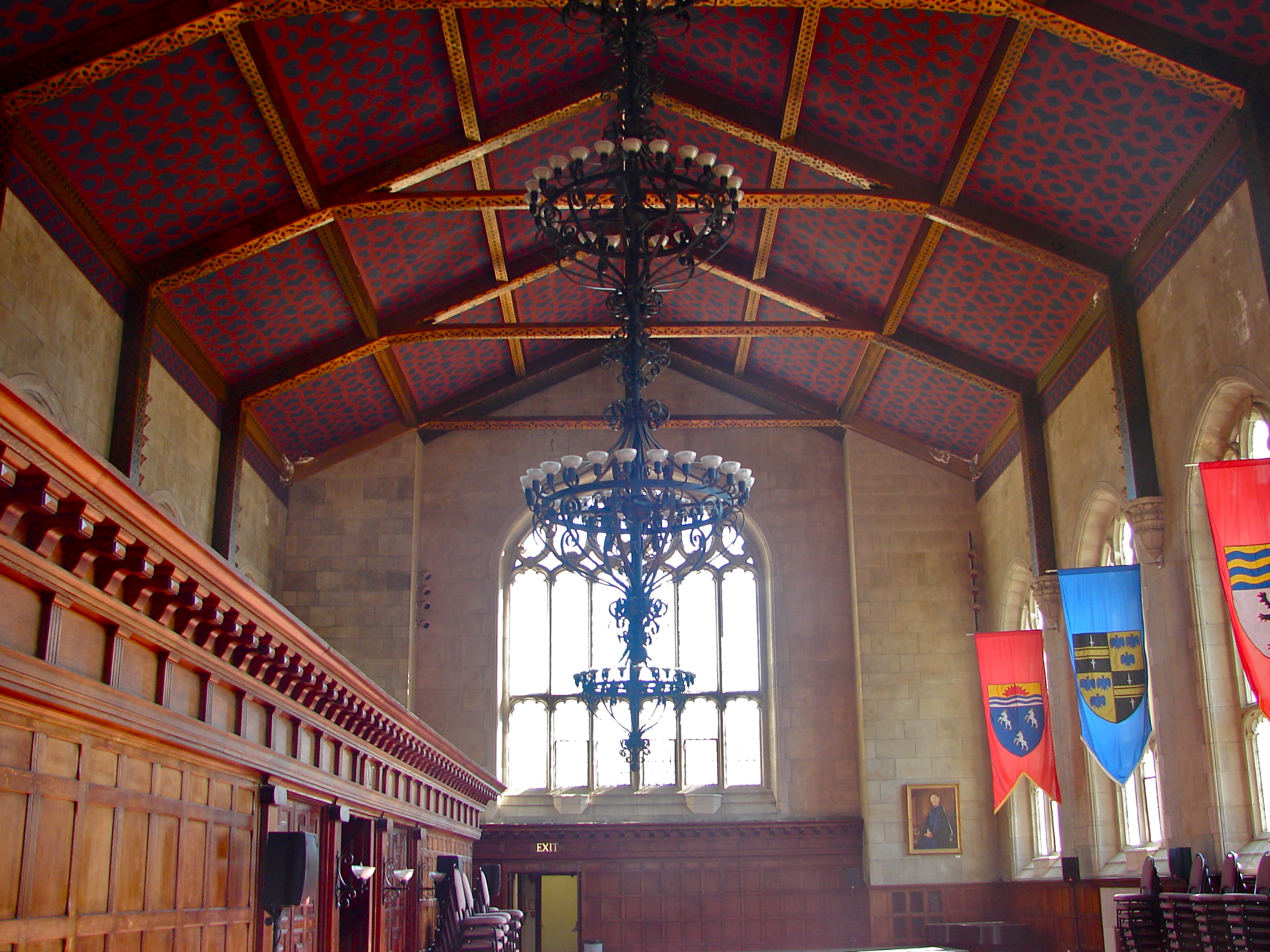
Great Hall, Bryn Mawr College

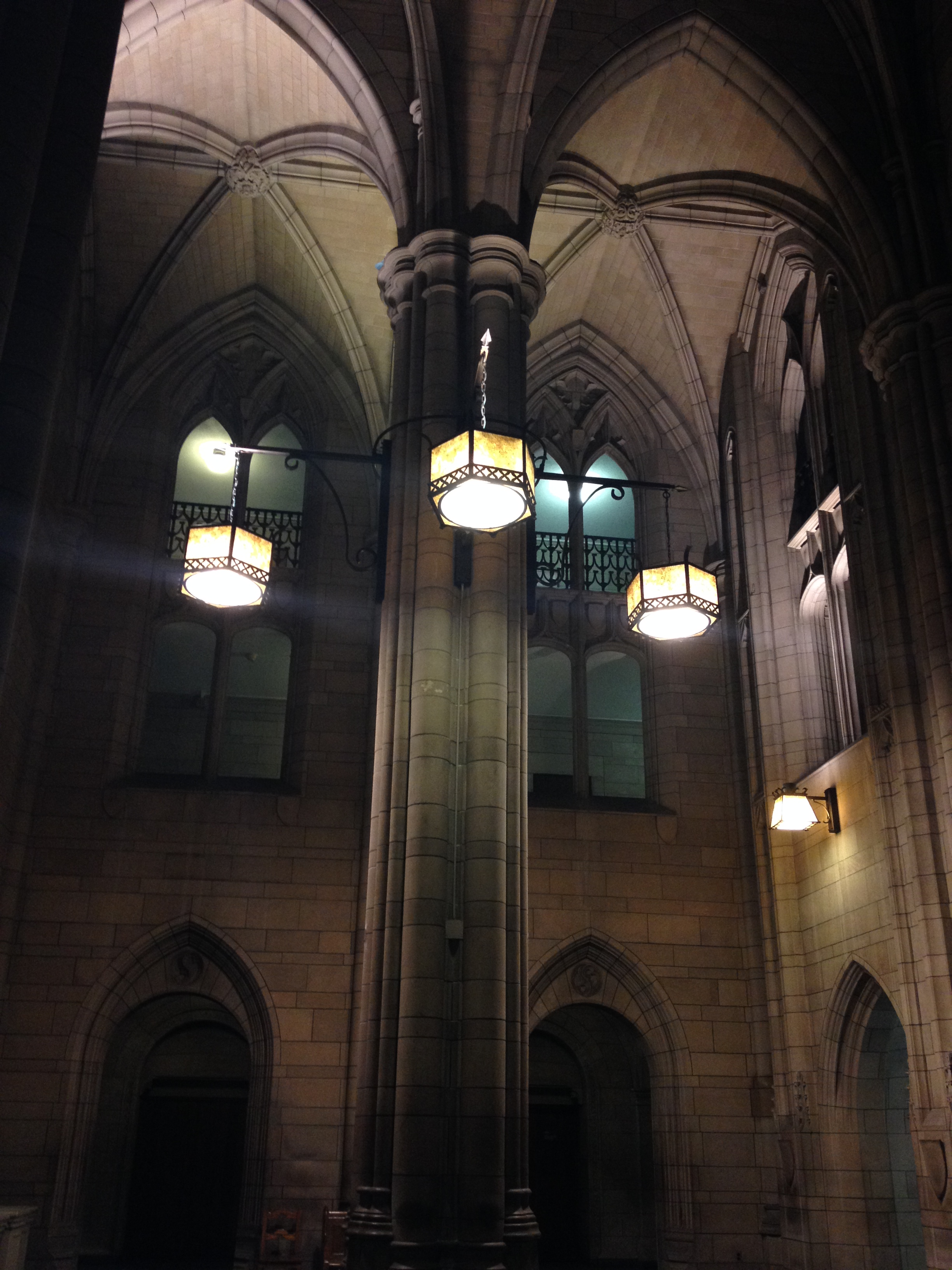
Cathedral of Learning (1926), University of Pittsburgh

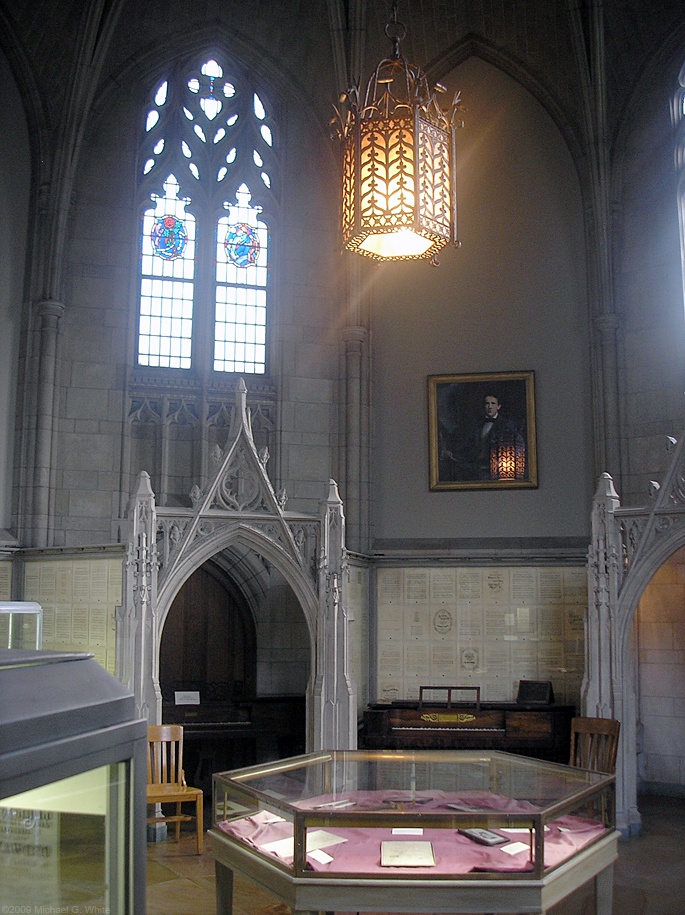
Stephen Foster Memorial (1937), University of Pittsburgh

==== Institutional and commercial ====
(Alphabetical by state)

- San Diego Air Station, San Diego, California
- Aetna Life Insurance Co, Hartford, Connecticut
- Peabody Museum, New Haven, Connecticut
- Bok Singing Tower, Lake Wales, Florida
- Sarasota Court House, Sarasota, Florida
- Union Pacific RR Station, Boise, Idaho
- Art Institute of Chicago, Chicago, Illinois
- Union Station, Indianapolis, Indiana
- Baltimore Trust Company, Baltimore, Maryland
- Detroit Institute of Art, Detroit, Michigan
- Detroit Public Library, Detroit, Michigan
- Detroit Society of Arts and Crafts, Detroit, Michigan
- Grand Rapids Art Gallery, Grand Rapids, Michigan
- University of Michigan Law Library, Ann Arbor, Michigan
- Lauren Rogers Museum of Art, Laurel, Mississippi
- Morristown Memorial, Morristown, New Jersey
- Ritz-Carlton Hotel, Atlantic City, New Jersey
- Victor Talking Machine Co, Camden, New Jersey
- American Radiator Building, New York City
- Barclay-Vesey Building, New York City
- Central Savings Bank, New York City
- The Cloisters (Metropolitan Museum of Art), New York City
- Dime Savings Bank, Brooklyn, New York City
- Federal Reserve Bank of New York, New York City
- Ford Motor Company, New York City
- General Motors Co., New York City
- International Business Machine (IBM) New York City
- Salvation Arm Headquarters, New York, New York City
- Allegheny County Courthouse, Pittsburgh, Pennsylvania
- Fidelity Mutual Life Insurance Company Building, Philadelphia, Pennsylvania
- Candoro Marble Works (showroom door), Knoxville, Tennessee
- Fidelity Bankers Trust, Knoxville, Tennessee
- Seattle Art Museum, Seattle, Washington
- Citizens Bank, Weston, West Virginia
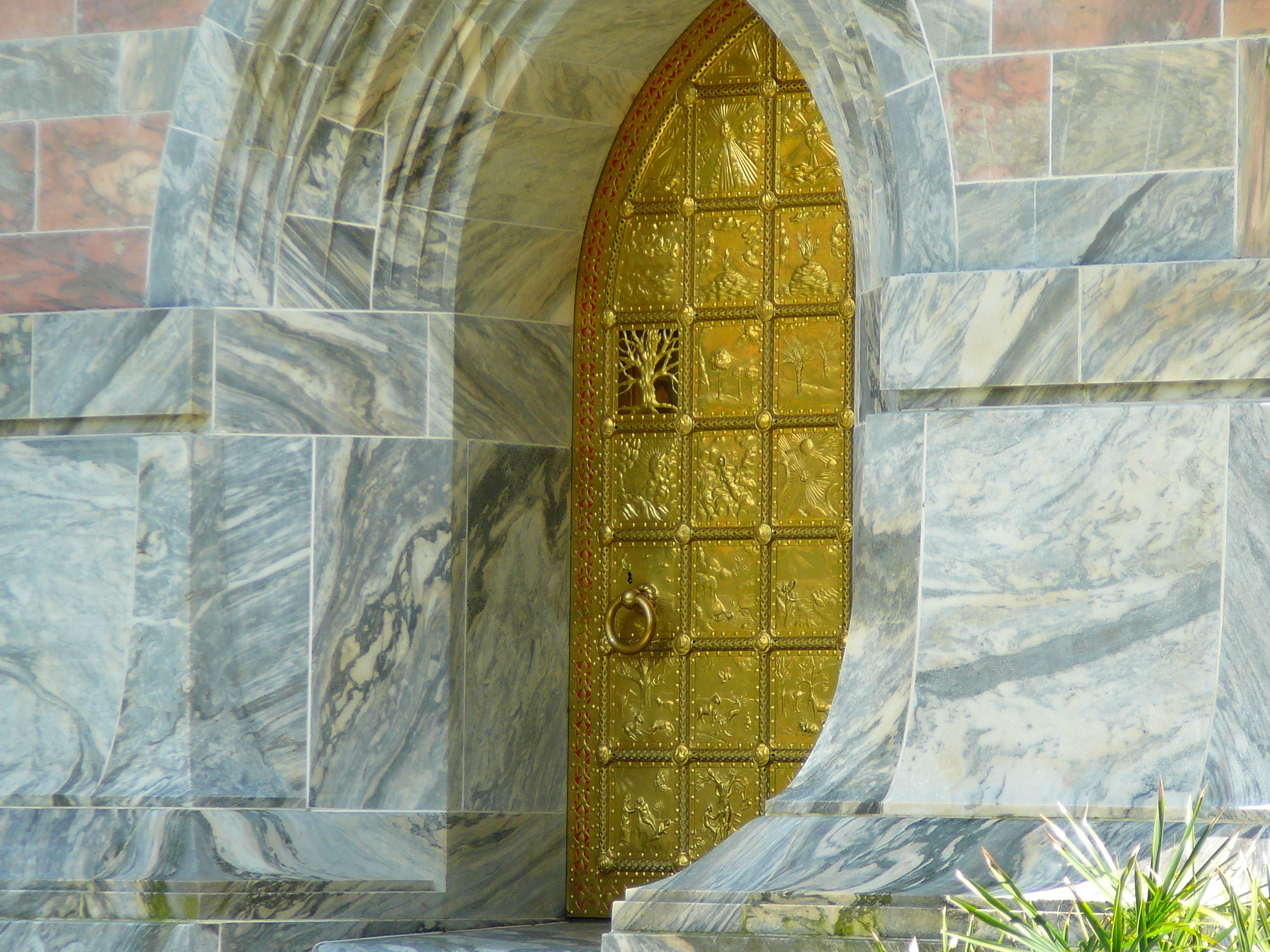
Great Brass Door, Bok Singing Tower, Lake Wales, Florida

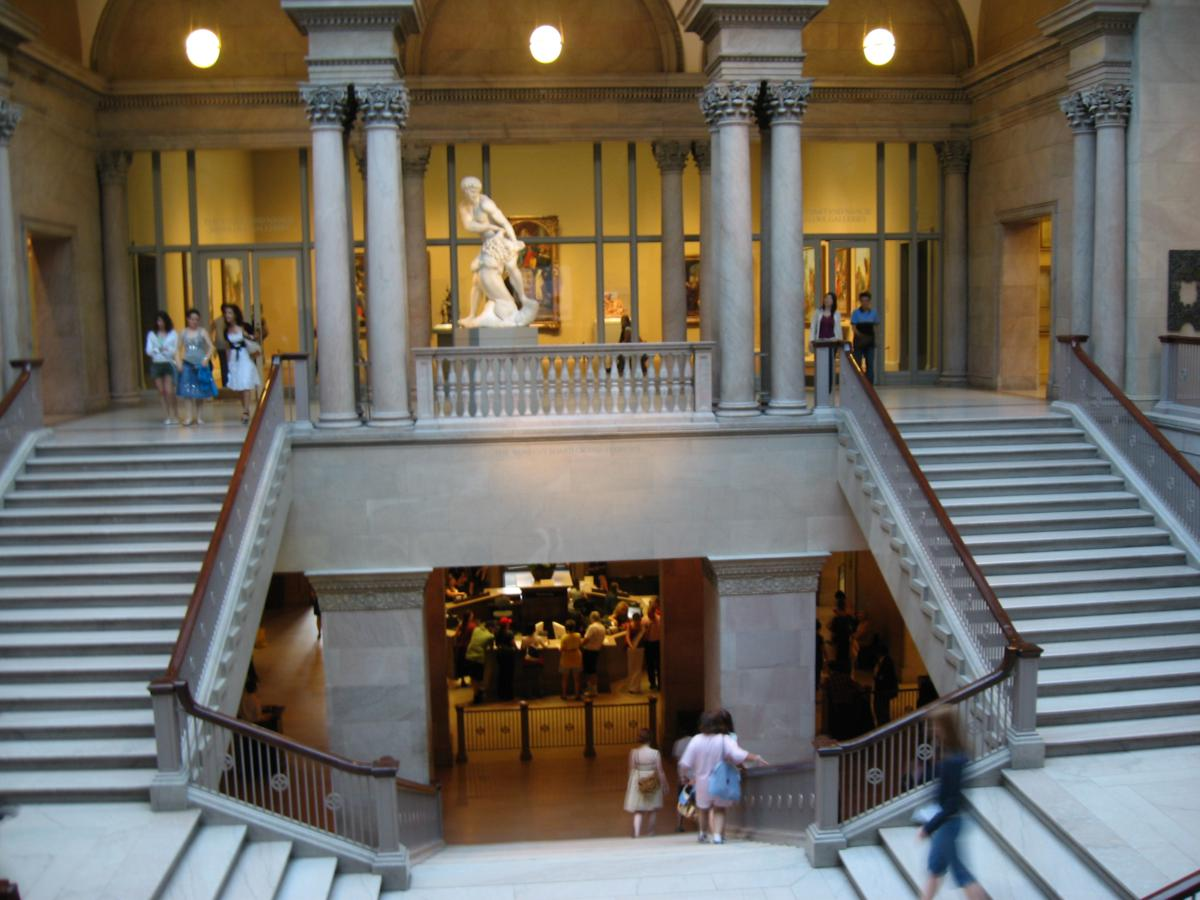
Art Institute of Chicago, Chicago, Illinois

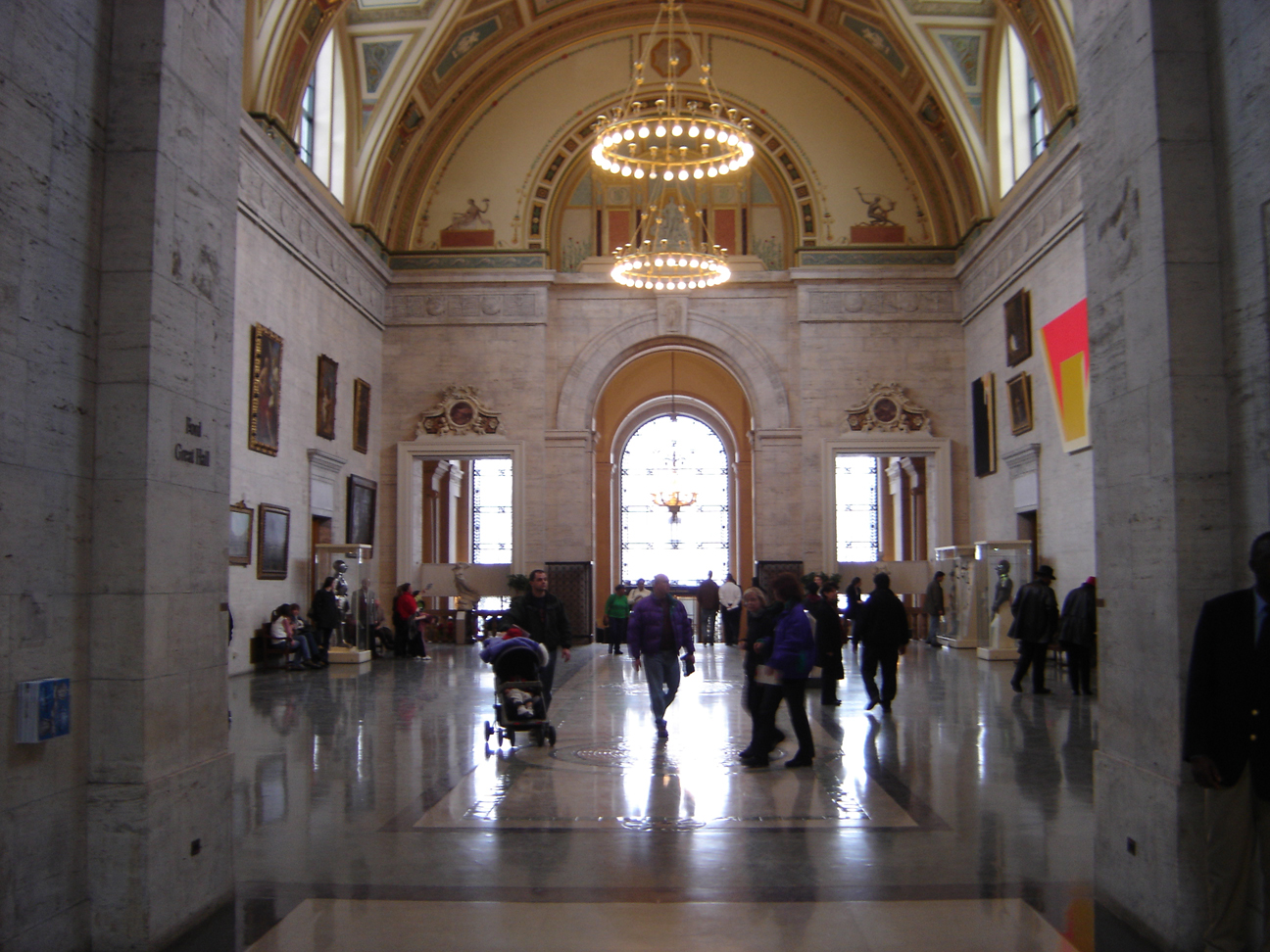
Detroit Institute of Art, Detroit, Michigan

=== Ecclesiastical ===
- Baltimore Pro-Cathedral, Baltimore, Maryland
- Blessed Sacrament Cathedral, Detroit, Michigan
- Church of the Good Shepherd (Rosemont, Pennsylvania)
- Congregation Emanu-El of the City of New York, NY
- Grace Cathedral, San Francisco, California
- Holy Trinity Lutheran Church, Akron, Ohio
- Park Avenue Christian Church, New York City
- Philadelphia Divinity School, closed 1974
- Salt Lake City Cathedral, Salt Lake City, Utah
- St. Bartholomew's Church, New York City
- Saint Clement's Church (Philadelphia), Lady Chapel gates
- Cathedral of St. John in the Wilderness, Denver, Colorado
- Cathedral of St. John the Divine, New York City
- St. Joseph's Roman Catholic Church, Canaan, Connecticut
- Episcopal Church of the Evangelists, Philadelphia, Pennsylvania. Now Fleisher Art Memorial.
- St. Mark's Episcopal Church (Philadelphia), Pennsylvania
- St. Patrick's Cathedral, New York City
- St. Patrick's Church, Philadelphia, Pennsylvania
- St. Paul's Episcopal Church, Kansas City, Missouri
- St. Thomas Church, New York City
- St. Vincent Ferrer, New York City
- Washington National Cathedral, Washington D.C.
- Washington Memorial Chapel, Valley Forge, Pennsylvania
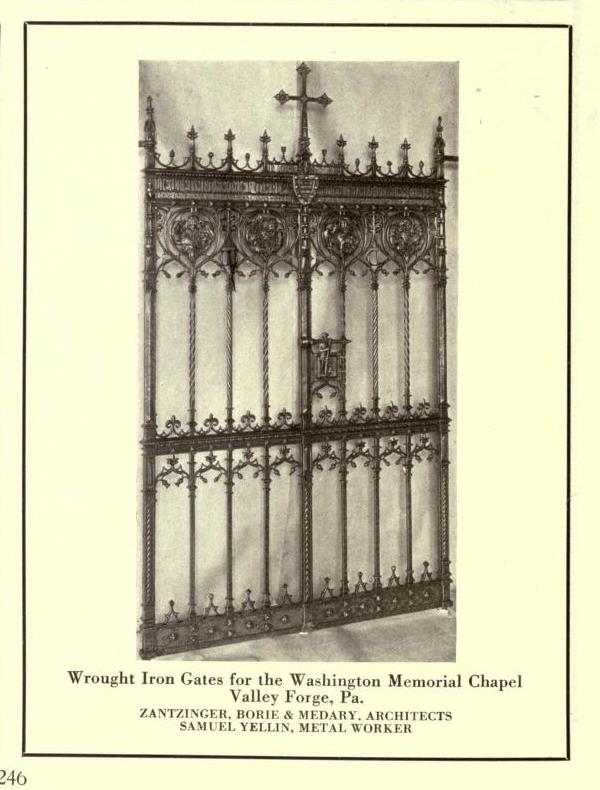
Harrison Memorial Gates (1918), Washington Memorial Chapel, Valley Forge, Pennsylvania

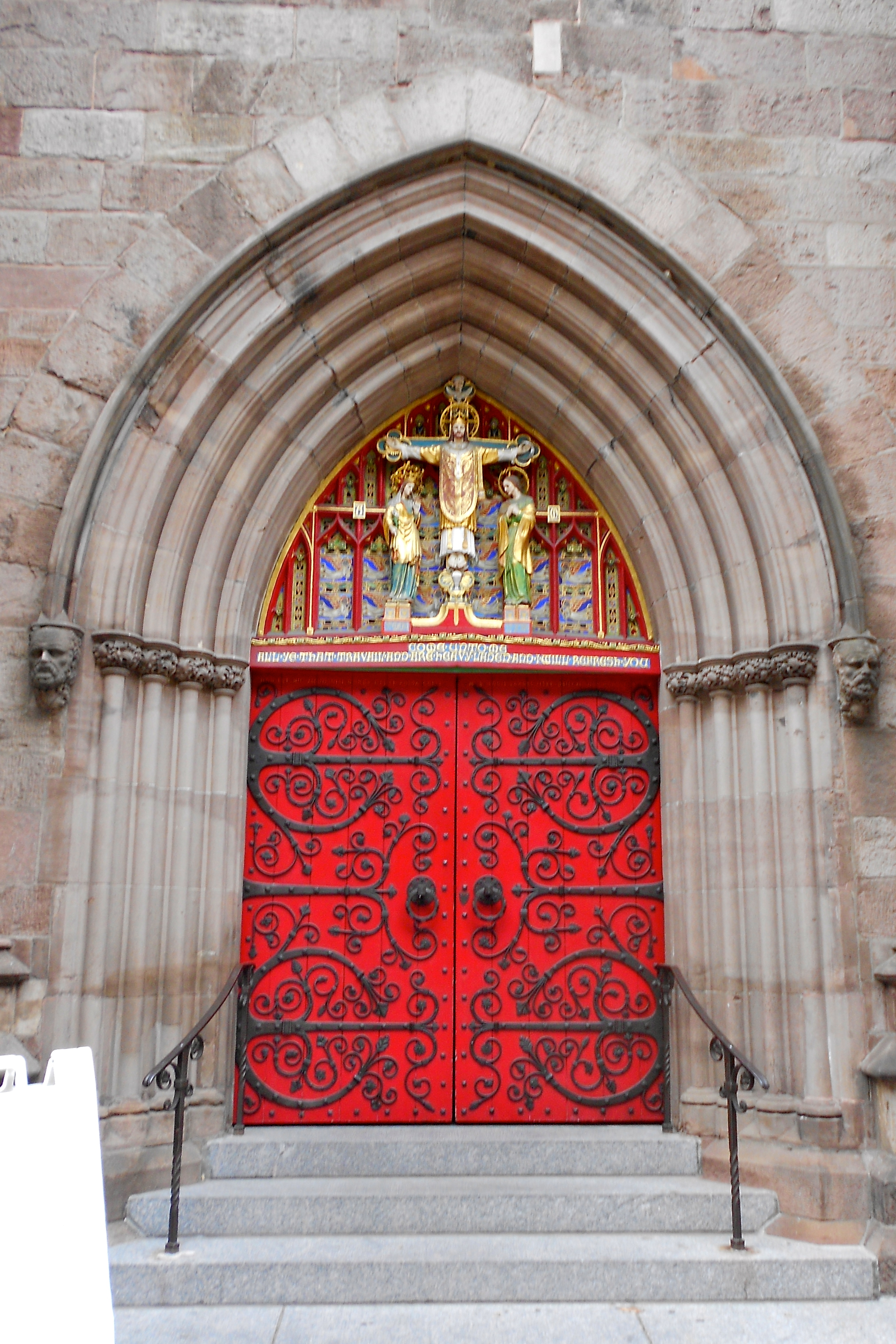
Fiske Portal (1922–23), St. Mark's Episcopal Church, Philadelphia

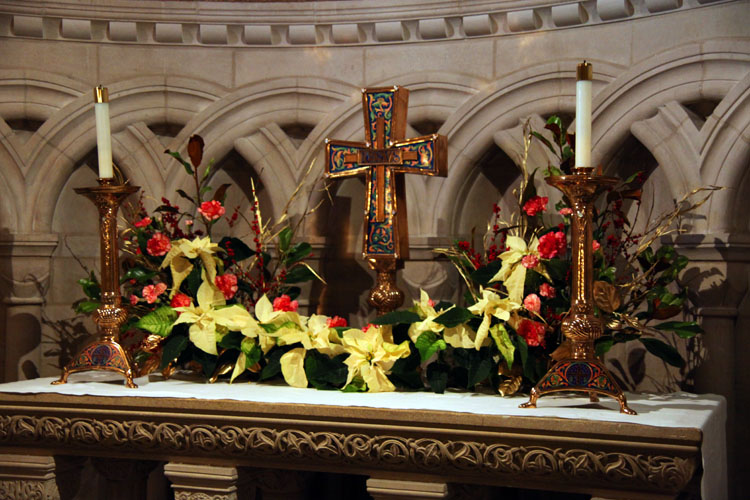
Cross & candlesticks (1925), Resurrection Chapel, Washington National Cathedral, Washington, D.C.

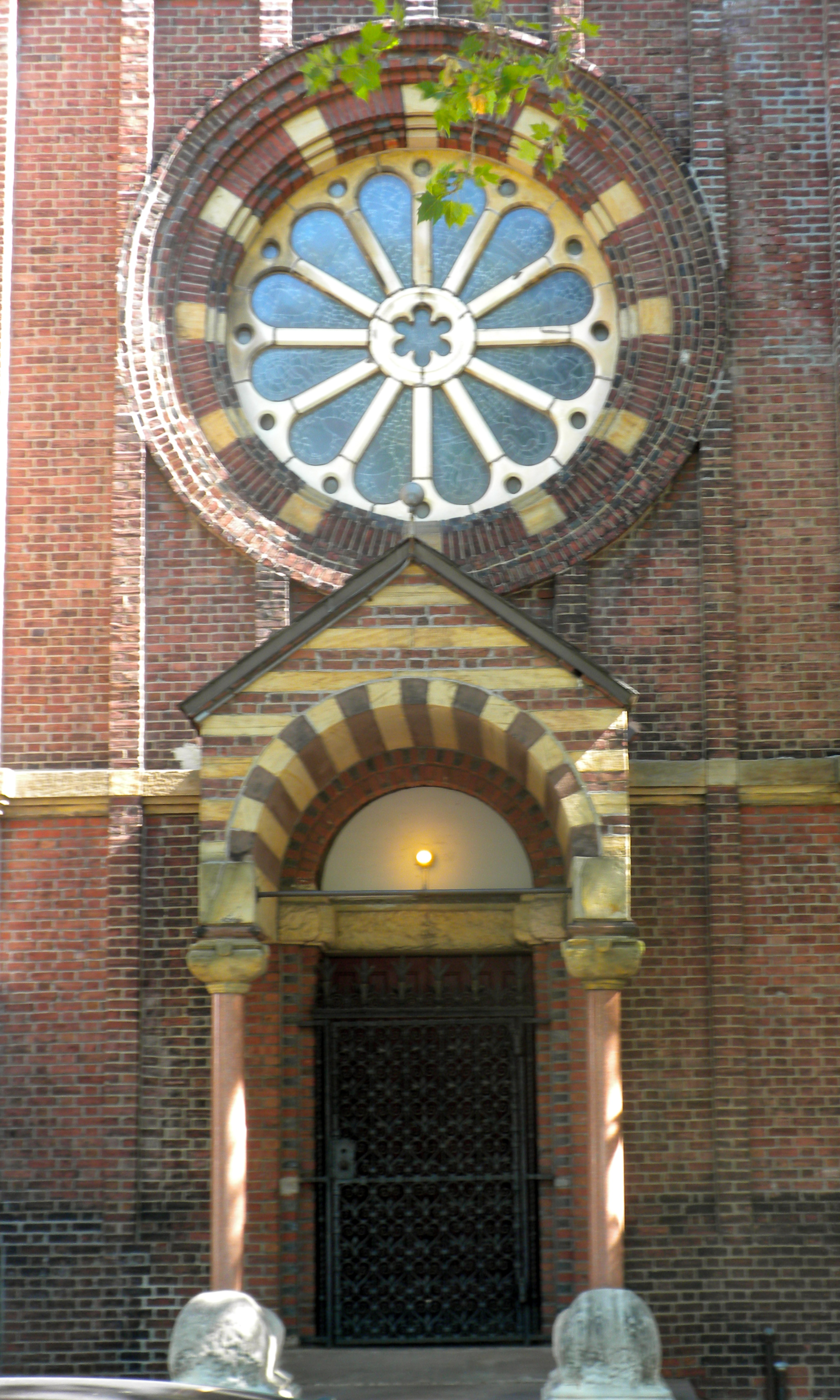
Entrance grille (1934), Fleisher Art Memorial, Philadelphia

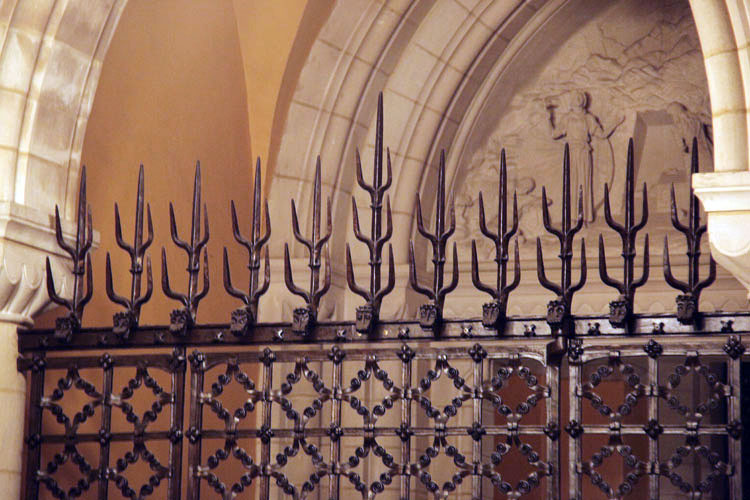
Screen (1938), St. Joseph of Arimathea Chapel, Washington National Cathedral

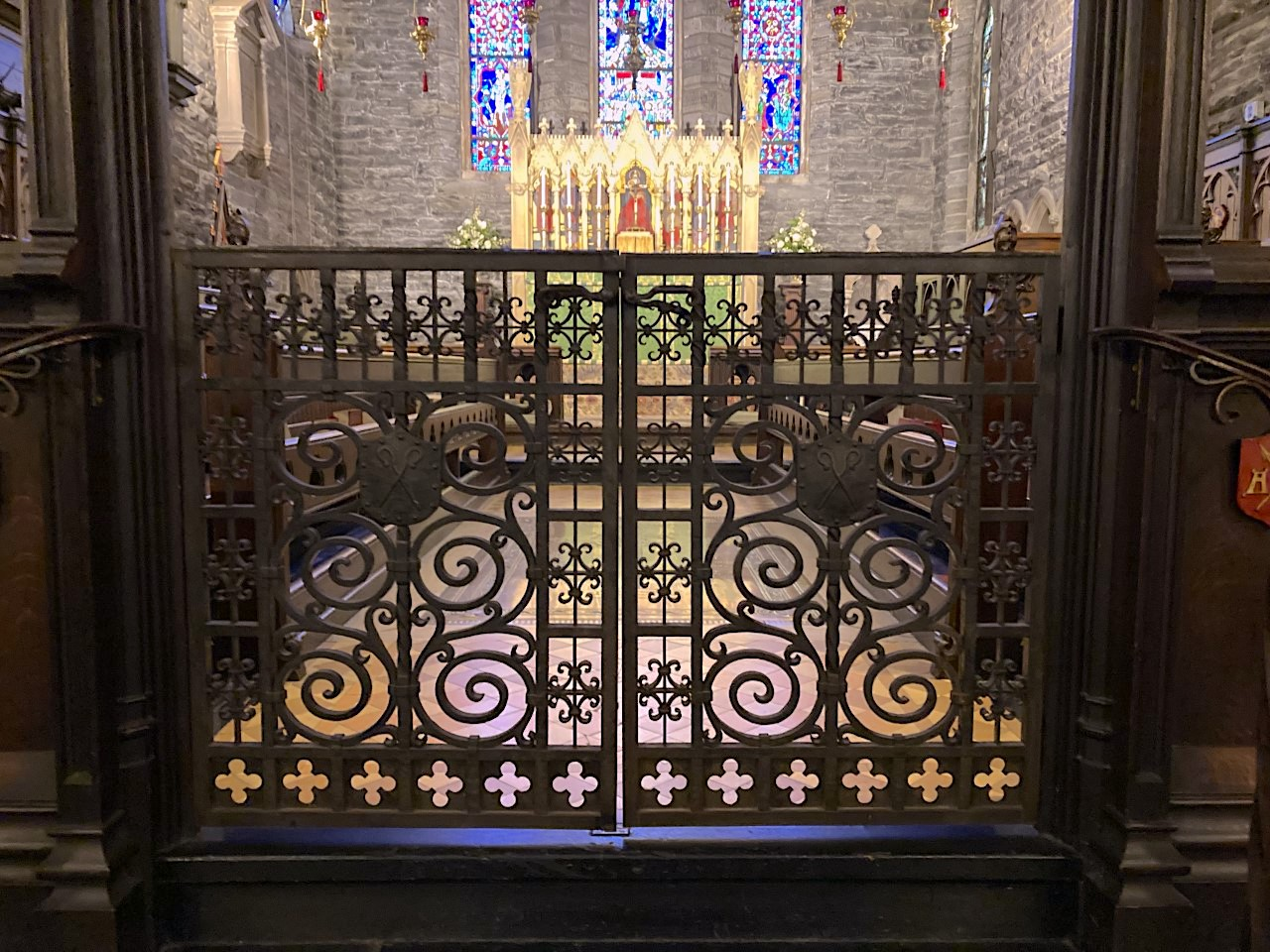
Chancel iron gates (ca. 1912) at Episcopal Church of the Good Shepherd in Rosemont, Pennsylvania

=== Residential ===
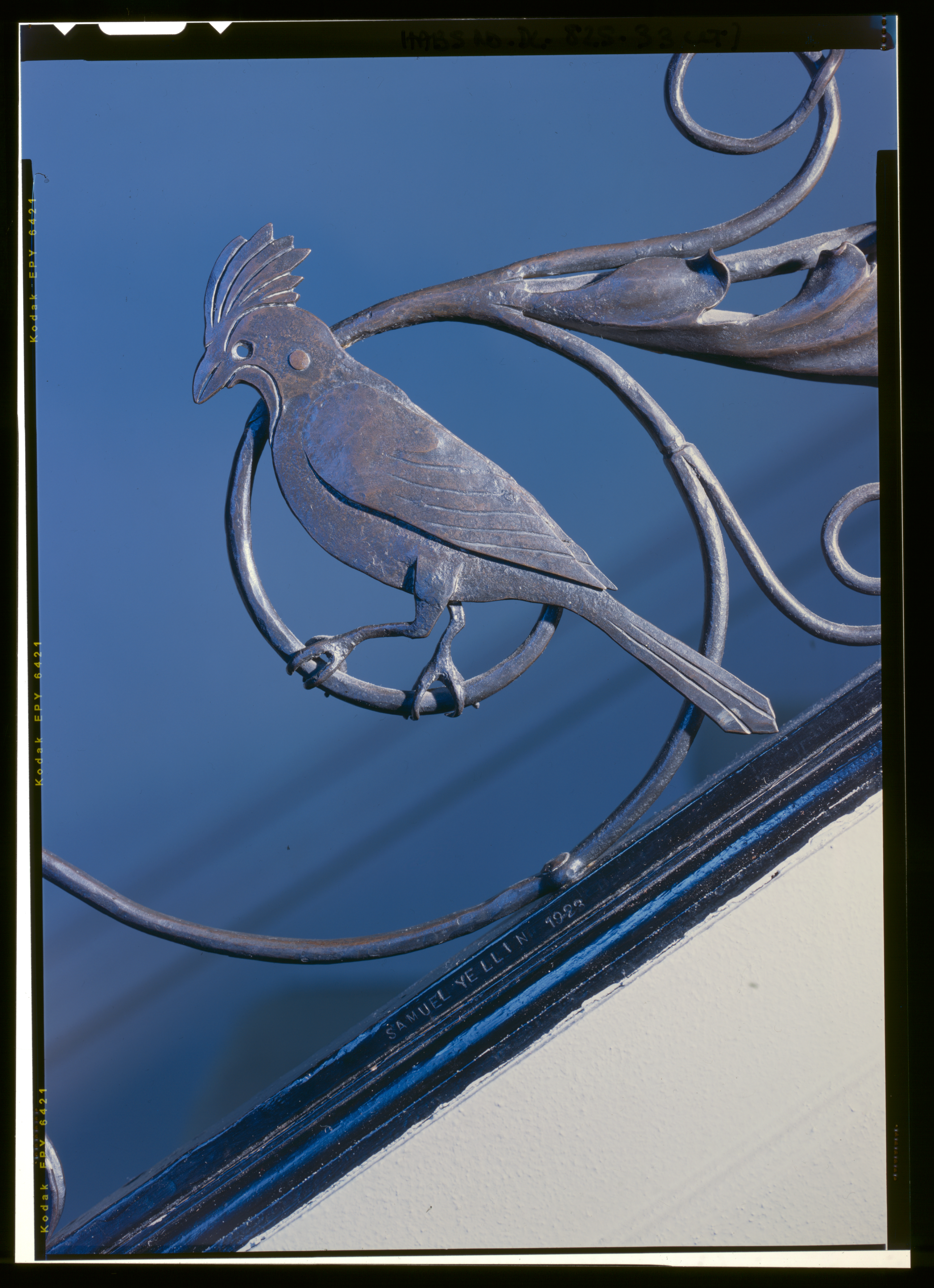
Detail of stair railing (1924), Dumbarton Oaks in Washington, D.C., including Yellin's name and year

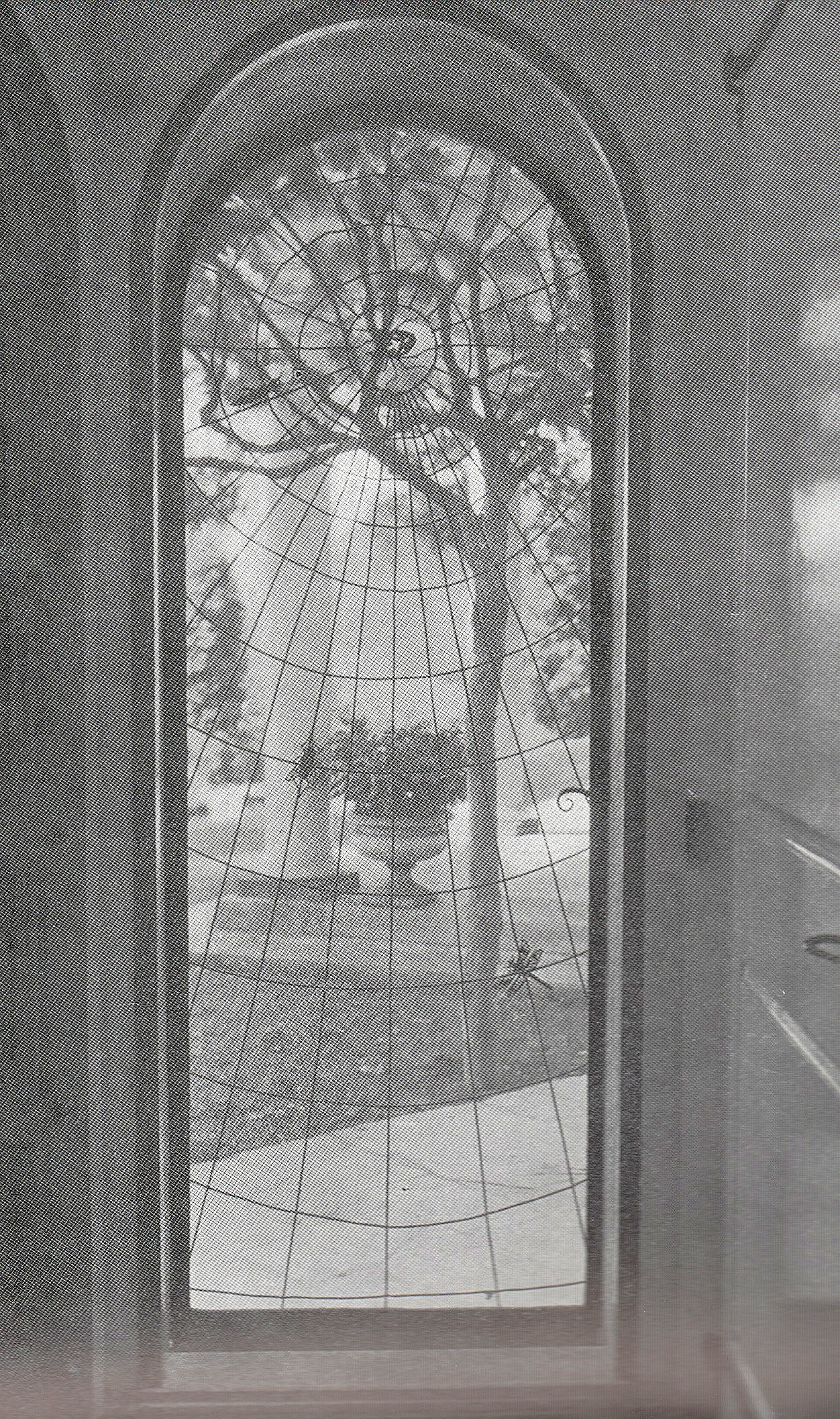
Spider screen from the Country Estate of Mrs. Arthur Meigs

(Alphabetical by state)

- Winterthur, Henry DuPont residence, Wilmington, Delaware
- Dumbarton Oaks, Robert Woods Bliss residence, Washington, D.C.
- Cyrus McCormick residence, Chicago, Illinois
- Cranbrook, George Gough Booth residence, Bloomfield Hills, Michigan
- George Eastman residence, Rochester, New York
- Fred Fisher residence, Detroit, Michigan
- William E. Scripps Estate, Lake Orion, Michigan
- George H. Christian Mansion, Minneapolis, Minnesota (current home of Hennepin History Museum)
- Frick Residence, New York City
- Dominican Academy High School, formerly the Michael Friedsam Residence, New York City
- Isaac Guggenheim residence, Port Washington, New York
- Matinecock Point, Estate of John Pierpont Morgan Jr., Glen Cove, Long Island, New York
- Rynwood, Estate of Samuel Agar Salvage, Glen Head, New York (architect, Roger Bullard)
- Eagle's Nest, Estate of William K. Vanderbilt II, Long Island, New York
- Planting Fields, Estate of William Robertson Coe, Long Island, New York
- Elie Nadelman residence, New York City
- Mrs. P.A. Rockefeller residence, Fayetteville, New York
- Walter Rosen, Caramoor, Katonah, New York
- Reynolda House, Winston-Salem, North Carolina
- Stan Hywet Hall, Frank A. Seiberling residence, Akron, Ohio
- E.W. Marland Estate, Ponca City, Oklahoma
- Edward Bok residence, Philadelphia, Pennsylvania
- Henry F. Miller residence, Philadelphia, Pennsylvania
- High Hollow, George Howe residence, Philadelphia, Pennsylvania
- Richard B. Mellon residence, Pittsburgh, Pennsylvania
- Cornelius Vanderbilt Whitney residence, Deer Run, Pennsylvania

== Architects whose names appear in Yellin's job book ==
- Ralph Adams Cram, Boston, MA
- Paul Cret, Philadelphia, PA
- Cass Gilbert, New York City, NY
- Bertram Goodhue, Boston and New York City
- George Howe, Philadelphia, PA
- Benno Janssen, Pittsburgh, PA
- Charles Klauder, Philadelphia, PA
- Milton Bennett Medary, Philadelphia, PA
- Arthur Ingersoll Meigs, Philadelphia, PA
- Walter Mellor, Philadelphia, PA
- George Washington Smith, Montecito, California
- Horace Trumbauer, Philadelphia, PA
- Walker and Gillette, New York City, NY
- Clarence C. Zantzinger, Philadelphia, PA
