= Laverock, Pennsylvania =

Unincorporated community in Pennsylvania, US

Laverock
- Unincorporated community Neighborhood of Cheltenham Township
- Location of Laverock in Pennsylvania Laverock (the United States)
- Coordinates: 40°5′42″N 75°10′52″W
- Country: United States
- State: Pennsylvania
- County: Montgomery
- Township: Cheltenham
- Commissioner: Art Haywood
- Elevation: 344 ft (105 m)
- Time zone: UTC-5 (Eastern Standard Time)
  - Summer (DST): UTC-4 (Eastern Daylight Time)
- ZIP Code: 19038
- Area codes: 215, 267 and 445

Laverock is a small unincorporated community that is located in Montgomery County, Pennsylvania, United States. Part of it is situated in Cheltenham Township and part is located in Springfield Township.

Laverock shares its Zip Code with Glenside, Pennsylvania and is a closed-in suburb of Philadelphia.

== History ==
Mansions erected on large pieces of ground were built in the area during the late-19th and early-20th centuries. Few were built after the 1929 onset of the Great Depression, and the area remained largely undeveloped until after World War II.

Today, the area is a residential-only neighborhood known for its abundance of large black oak trees.

== Laverock Farm ==
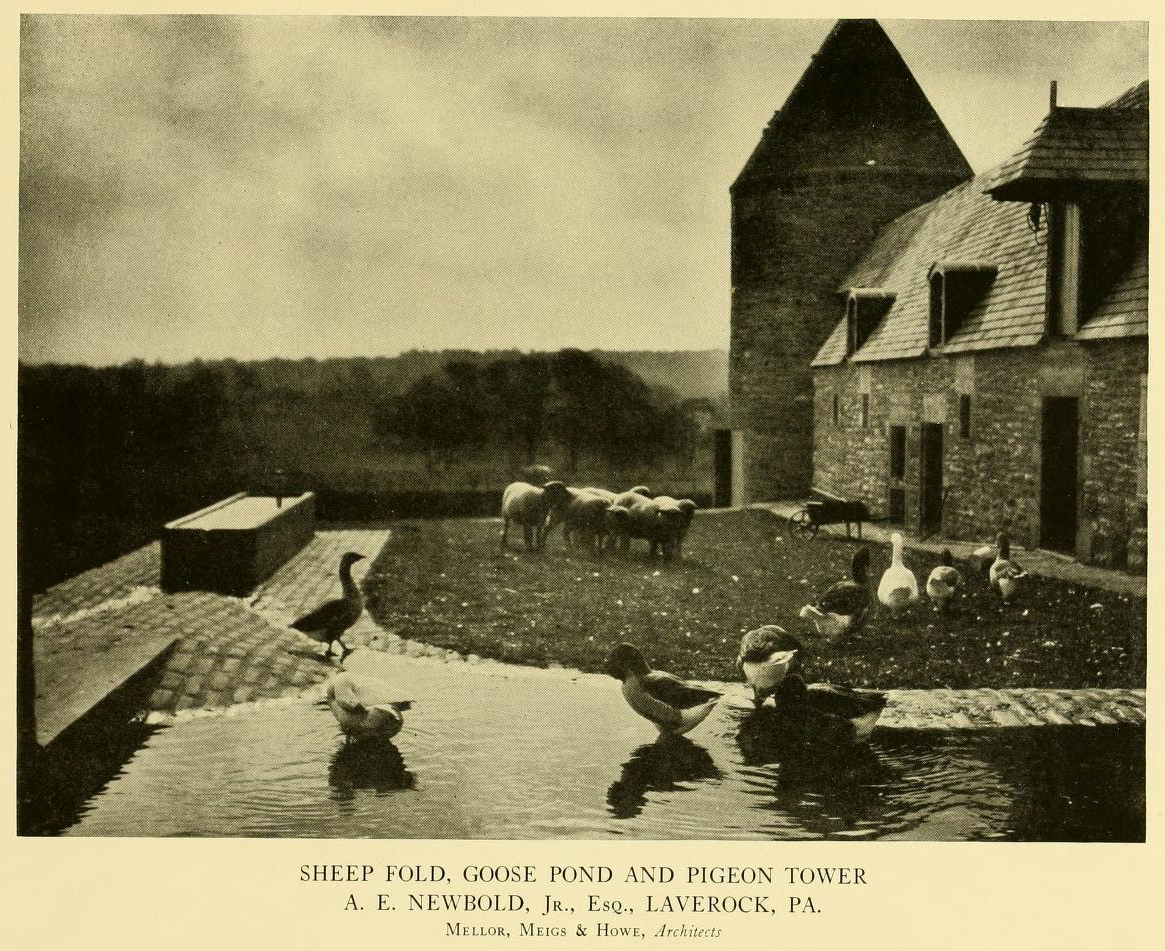
Laverock Farm in 1922

Arthur E. Newbold built a Colonial-Revival mansion and estate, "Farleigh," on the north side of Willow Grove Avenue in 1895. His son, Arthur Jr., hired architect Arthur Ingersoll Meigs of Mellor, Meigs & Howe to transform the mansion into a Norman-Revival manor house. Between 1919 and 1925, Meigs created "Laverock Farm" – a working farm housed in a group of exquisitely crafted buildings that deftly mixed the antique and the modern. It was awarded the 1925 Gold Medal for Excellence in Design by the Architectural League of New York.

In an influential review in The New Republic titled "The Architecture of Escape," critic Lewis Mumford denounced "Laverock Farm" and buildings like it as "architectural anaesthesia" and "hocus-pocus":

The critical weakness of the romantic architect is that he is employed in creating an environment into which people may escape from a sordid workaday world, whereas the real problem of architecture is to remake the workaday world so that people will not wish to escape from it.

"Laverock Farm" lasted barely 30 years, it was demolished in 1956. A development of split-level houses was built on the former estate and as infill around other existing houses.
