= Friendfield Plantation =

- U.S. National Register of Historic Places
- U.S. Historic district
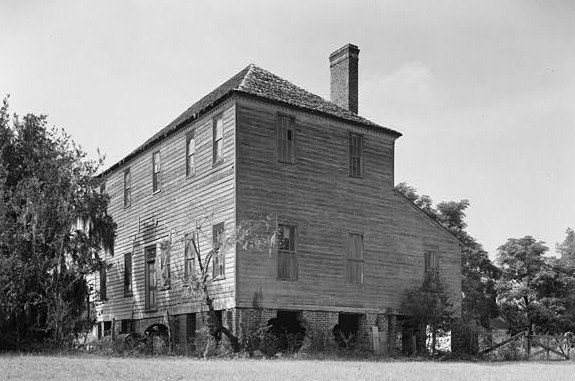
- Silver Hill Plantation, Friendfield Estate

- Location within South Carolina Location within the United States
- Nearest city: Georgetown, South Carolina
- Coordinates: 33.3682°N 79.3226°W
- Area: 3,305 acres (1,337 ha)
- Built: 1830
- Architect: Walter Mellor and Arthur I. Meigs (Friendship House, 1931-36)
- Architectural style: Colonial Revival (Friendship House)
- MPS: Georgetown County Rice Culture MPS
- NRHP reference No.: 96000409
- Added to NRHP: April 12, 1996

Friendfield Plantation is a 3,305-acre plantation near Georgetown, South Carolina composed of parts of six former historic plantations and Friendship House, built in 1931-36. It was listed on the National Register of Historic Places in 1996. Contributing elements of the listing include 23 buildings, 15 other structures, and 14 sites.

In the 1850s, some 230 African Americans were enslaved on Friendfield Plantation and they produced 900,000 pounds of rice annually. Among them was Jim Robinson, born into slavery in 1850; one of his descendants is former First Lady Michelle Obama (née Robinson.)

== Overview ==
The current owner is Oscar Johnson Small II and his second wife Robbie Kephart.

The founder and first owner was James Withers (1710-1756), a brick maker in Charleston, South Carolina who also became a planter. He developed a plantation along the Sampit River for indigo and rice from 1734 onward, based on the use of enslaved labor. He bought slaves from Barbados, where they had been transported from Africa and were sometimes seasoned for a period of time. In 1818, Francis Withers (1768-1847), a grandson of James, built a new house on the Friendfield Plantation.

In the Low Country, where slaves developed a concentrated culture on large plantations, and slaves from Africa continued to be imported, African Americans developed what became known as the Gullah or GeeChee culture. It has been recognized as distinct for its creole African roots in language, cuisine and culture, and adaptations to the region. Paternal ancestors of First Lady Michelle (Robinson) Obama, including Jim Robinson, were among the Gullah enslaved laborers on the Friendfield Plantation.

Francis Wither appointed his son-in-law, Dr. Alexius Mador Forster, III, MD (1815-1879), to manage the plantation, but it fell into disrepair after the American Civil War. An extended agricultural depression in the country brought down commodity prices. Combined with struggling with the change to free labor, planters faced a sudden lack of economic resources. After the war, Withers had the land cultivated mostly by sharecroppers, freedmen who paid a portion of their crop to use the land. Michelle Obama's ancestor Jim Robinson, who became free at age 15, is believed to have been among them.

Friendfield Plantation passed out of the Withers family in 1897 when Elizabeth Hunt Warham Forster (1820-1906) sold it to B. Walker Cannon. (It had passed from the Withers bloodline in 1847 when Francis Withers died, as Elizabeth was his step-daughter.)

The property was later purchased by Patrick C. McClary, Sr., who used it as a duck hunting club. This was a common use for plantations by wealthy owners in the early 20th century. In 1926, the Friendfield House burned down in a fire.

In 1930, the plantation was purchased by Radcliffe Cheston, Jr., an investment banker from Philadelphia, Pennsylvania. In 1932, he had a new Friendfield House built, designed by noted Philadelphia architect Arthur Ingersoll Meigs (1882-1956).

Up until the 1950s, African-American sharecroppers lived on the plantation and worked the fields. But during the early 20th century, thousands of African Americans left the South to go north in the Great Migration to industrial cities, seeking better opportunities and an escape from Jim Crow oppression. Michelle Obama's paternal grandfather Fraser Robinson, Jr. migrated to Chicago from the Georgetown area. He and his wife LaVaughn (née Johnson) returned to the Low Country from Chicago after retirement.

In 1989, the property was partly purchased by Daniel Thorne; it was co-owned by him and Frances Cheston Train, a daughter of Radcliffe Cheston. In 2015, Oscar Johnson Small II and his second wife Robbie Kephart bought the property.
