= Mellor, Meigs & Howe =

American architectural firm (1906–40)

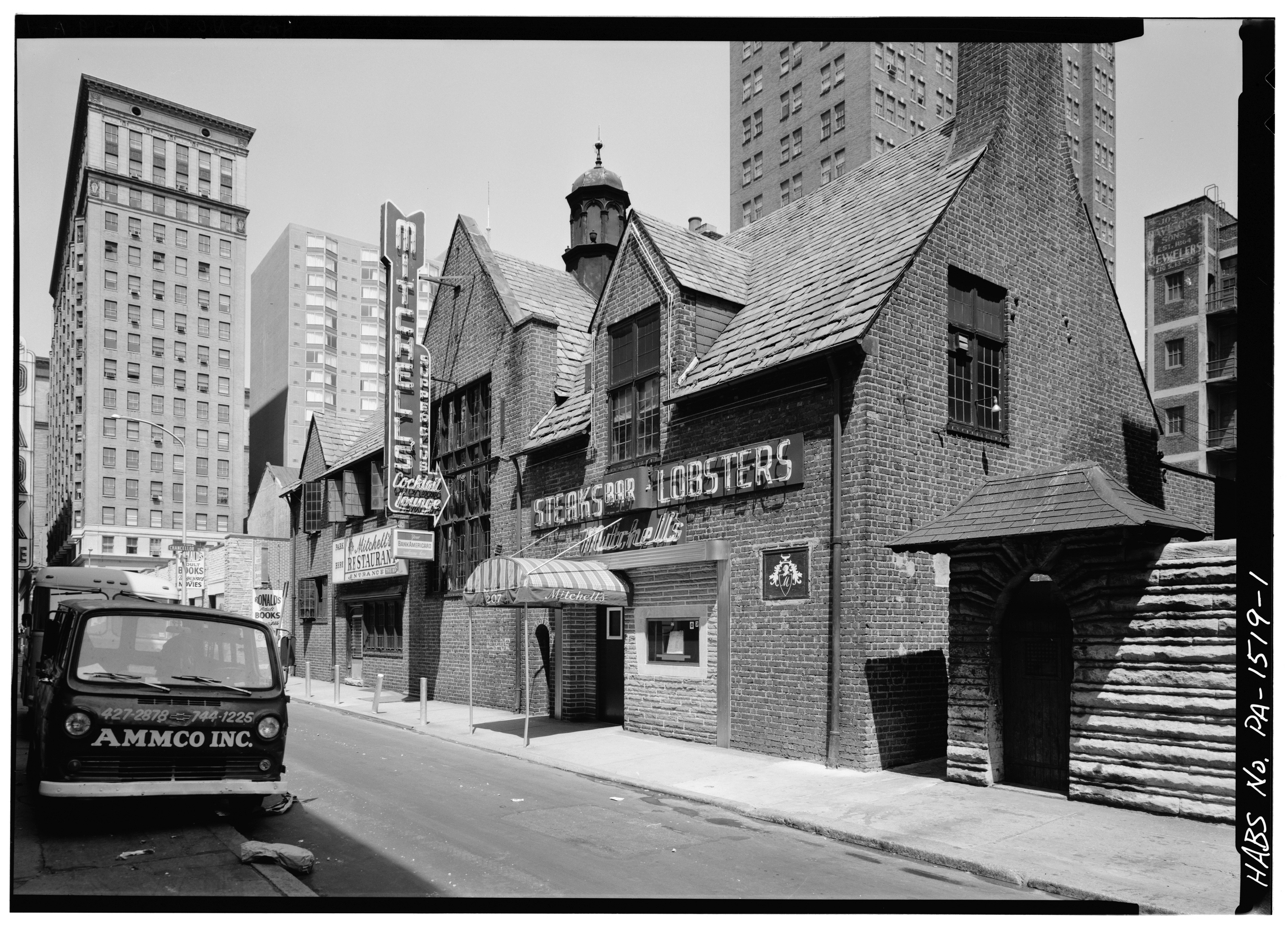
Mellor, Meigs & Howe architectural office (altered in 1912 from a stable), Philadelphia.

Mellor, Meigs & Howe was a Philadelphia architectural firm best remembered for its Neo-Norman residential designs. It was known as Mellor & Meigs from 1906 to 1917 and from 1928 to 1940, and as Mellor, Meigs & Howe from 1917 to 1928.

== Mellor & Meigs (1906–17 & 1928–40) ==
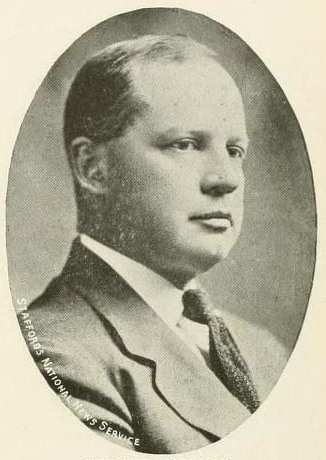
Walter Mellor, 1920.

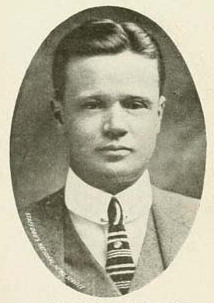
Arthur I. Meigs, 1920.

Mellor & Meigs was founded in 1906 by Walter Mellor and Arthur Ingersoll Meigs, who had worked together in the office of Theophilus P. Chandler Jr. The young architects designed clubs and suburban residences in a variety of revivalist styles.

The pair converted a former stable on Juniper Street into their architectural office, with drafting rooms on two floors and a high-ceilinged private office for entertaining clients. For the firm's early commissions, they relied on family and personal connections. Meigs was a graduate of Princeton University. He designed the Colonial Revival Princeton Charter Club (1912–14), one of the university's eating clubs. Mellor had joined the Phi Gamma Delta ("Fiji") fraternity while attending the University of Pennsylvania School of Architecture. He designed a Collegiate Gothic "Fiji" house at his alma mater (1913–14) and "Fiji" houses at Penn State University (1914–15) and at the University of Washington (1929).

Meigs designed an elaborate Tudor Revival fantasy for "Glen Brook" (1914–17), the Caspar W. Morris residence in Haverford, Pennsylvania. Mellor secured the commission for and designed the Renaissance Revival Bird House (1914–15) at the Philadelphia Zoo. Samuel Yellin fashioned custom metalwork for many of the firm's projects, and Mellor & Meigs designed a Spanish Revival workshop (1915) for him in West Philadelphia.

== Mellor, Meigs & Howe (1917–28) ==
George Howe, who had graduated from the Ecole de Beaux Arts and worked in the office of Furness, Evans & Company, joined Mellor & Meigs in February 1917. Meigs was more restrained in designing "Ropsley" (1916–18), the Francis I. McIlhenny residence in Wyndmoor, Pennsylvania, whose innovative plan is credited to Howe. "Ropsley" was more Norman than English, and Meigs designed gardens that were an integral part of the whole.

Howe and Meigs both served in the Armed Forces during World War I, and were absent from the firm, 1917–19. Following their return, they developed an "American domestic architecture based on vernacular forms."

Their buildings were erected on an intelligent organic plan and executed in local materials with unusual structural honesty. The result was a kind of international provincial style, individual and consistent, which had a tiny influence on American domestic architecture.

The firm received awards and national attention—winning the 1922 Gold Medal from the Philadelphia Chapter of the American Institute of Architects (for the Robert T. McCracken residence), and the 1925 Gold Medal for Excellence in Design from the Architectural League of New York (for Laverock Farm). Their mature Neo-Norman style, an "amalgram of Howe's formalism and sensitivity to materials with some of the more theatrically picturesque elements of Arthur Meig's work," was repeated at Oxmoor (1926) and Pheasant Run Farm (1927–29).

Meigs is credited as the primary designer of Marjorie Walter Goodhart Hall (1926–28), the auditorium and concert hall of Bryn Mawr College. The $410,000 commission was the firm's largest, and the French Gothic building featured soaring arches and extensive ironwork by Yellin. Meigs was celebrated at its December 4, 1928 formal opening, a concert by the Philadelphia Orchestra under conductor Leopold Stokowski.

Various conflicts within the firm – including a dispute over design credit for Goodhart Hall – led to Howe's departure in 1928. He said that he was leaving, "to become a priest of the Modern Faith." Howe partnered with William Lescaze on the PSFS Building (1930–32) in Philadelphia, the first International Style skyscraper constructed in the United States. He continued his career as a Modernist architect.

The firm's name reverted to Mellor & Meigs, and it continued with mostly residential work until Mellor's death in 1940. Meigs associated with younger architects on projects, before going into semi-retirement.

== Selected works ==
=== Mellor & Meigs ===
- Alterations to Pickering Hunt Club (1911, 1915), Phoenixville, Pennsylvania.
- Mellor & Meigs Architectural Office (1912), 205-07 S. Juniper Street, Philadelphia.
- Leonard T. Beale residence (1912–14), 114 Cambria Court, St. Davids, Pennsylvania.
- Princeton Charter Club (1912–14), 79 Prospect Avenue, Princeton, New Jersey.
- Phi Gamma Delta Fraternity House (1913–14), University of Pennsylvania, 3619-21 Locust Walk, Philadelphia.
- Bird House (1914–15), Philadelphia Zoo.
- "Glen Brook," Caspar W. Morris residence (1914–17), 407 Rose Lane, Haverford, Pennsylvania.
- Yellin Ornamental Iron Works Shop (1915), 5520-24 Arch Street, Philadelphia.
- Mrs. A. J. Devereux residence (1916–17), West Shore Drive, Dark Harbor, Maine.
- John F. Meigs II residence, (1916–17, 1928), Newtown Road, Radnor, Pennsylvania.
- Heatley C. Dulles residence (1917), Broughton Lane, Villanova, Pennsylvania.
- Friendfield House (1931–32, 1936–37), Friendfield Road, Georgetown, South Carolina, listed on the National Register of Historic Places. The plantation house burned in 1926. Meigs designed a Colonial Revival replacement, and later expanded it.
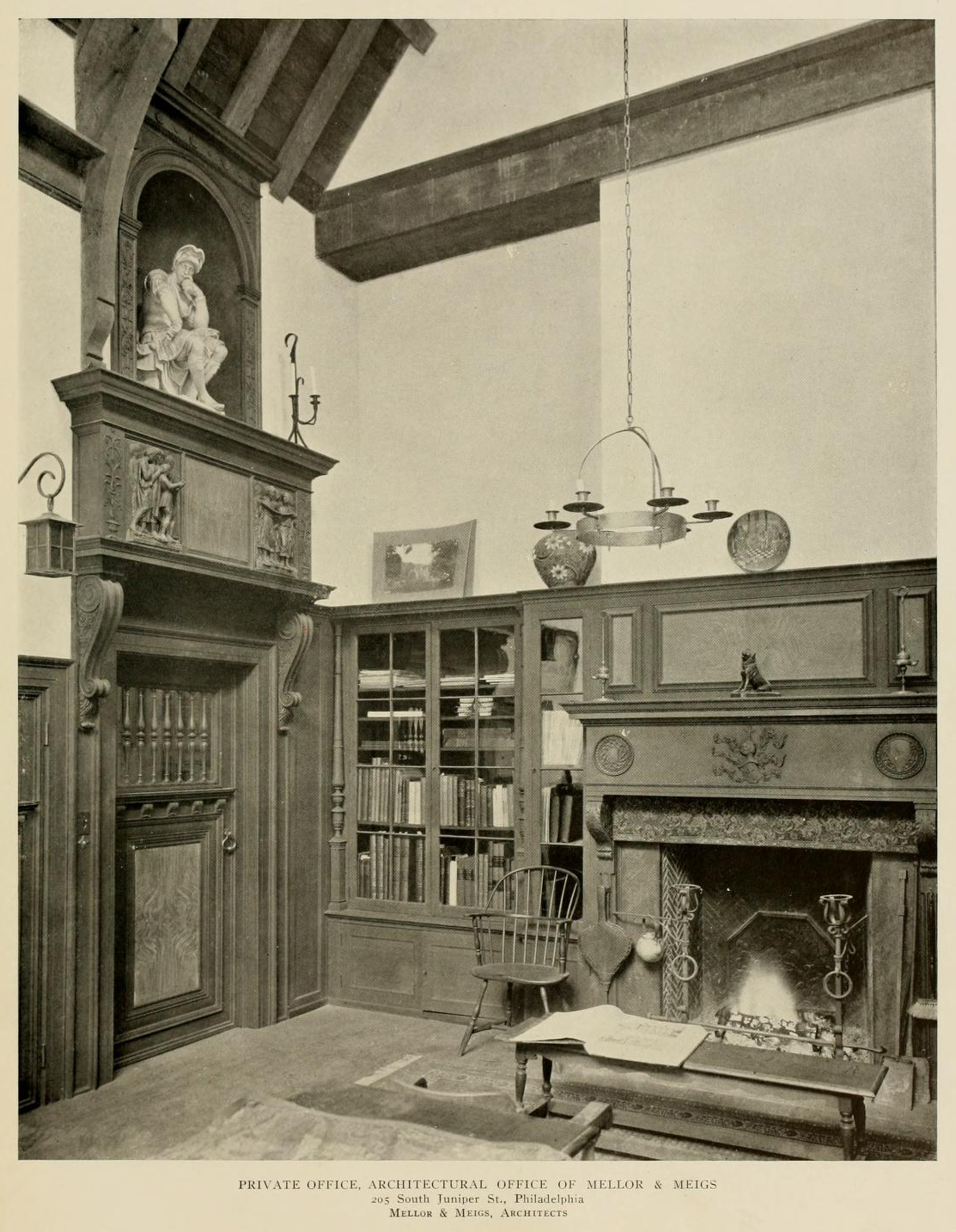
Private office of Mellor & Meigs (1912), Philadelphia

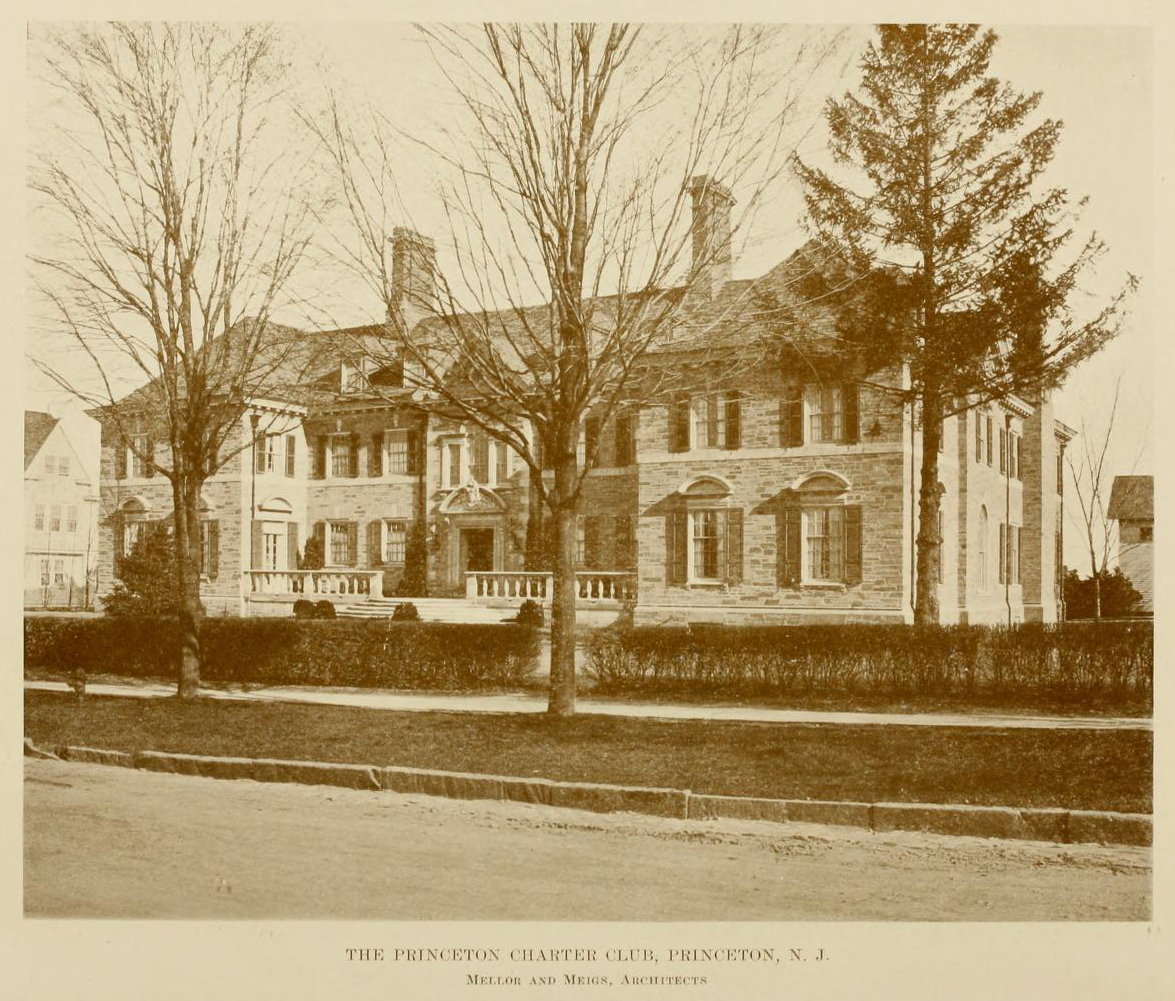
Princeton Charter Club (1912–14), Princeton University

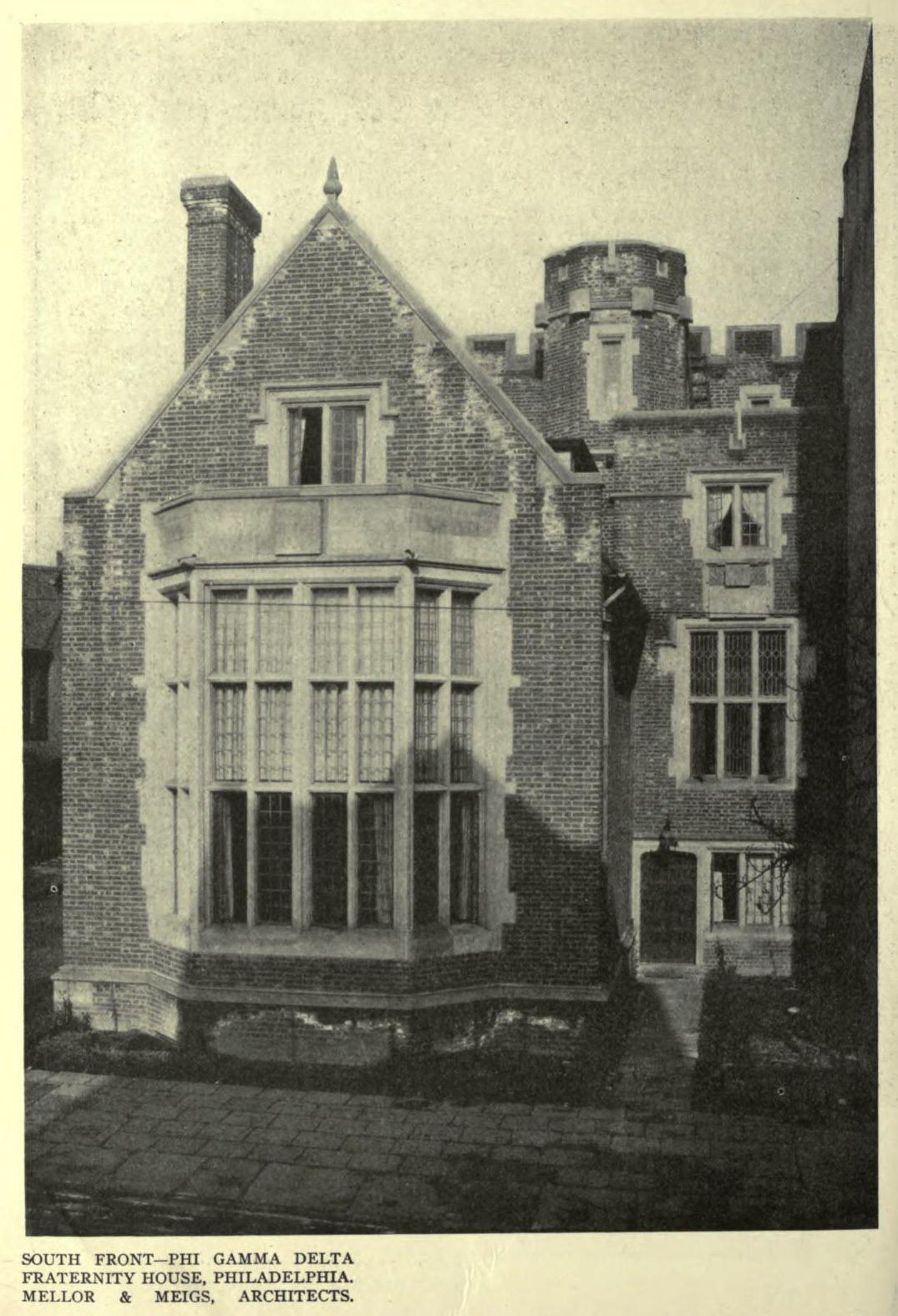
Phi Gamma Delta Fraternity House (1913–14), University of Pennsylvania, West Philadelphia

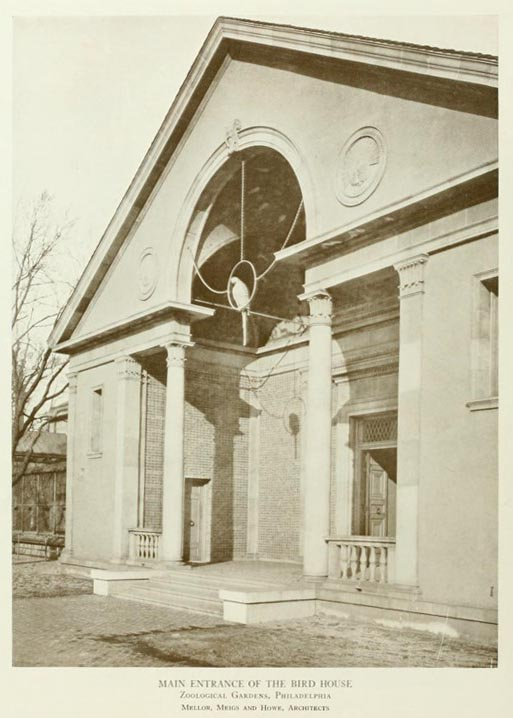
Bird House (1914–15), Philadelphia Zoo

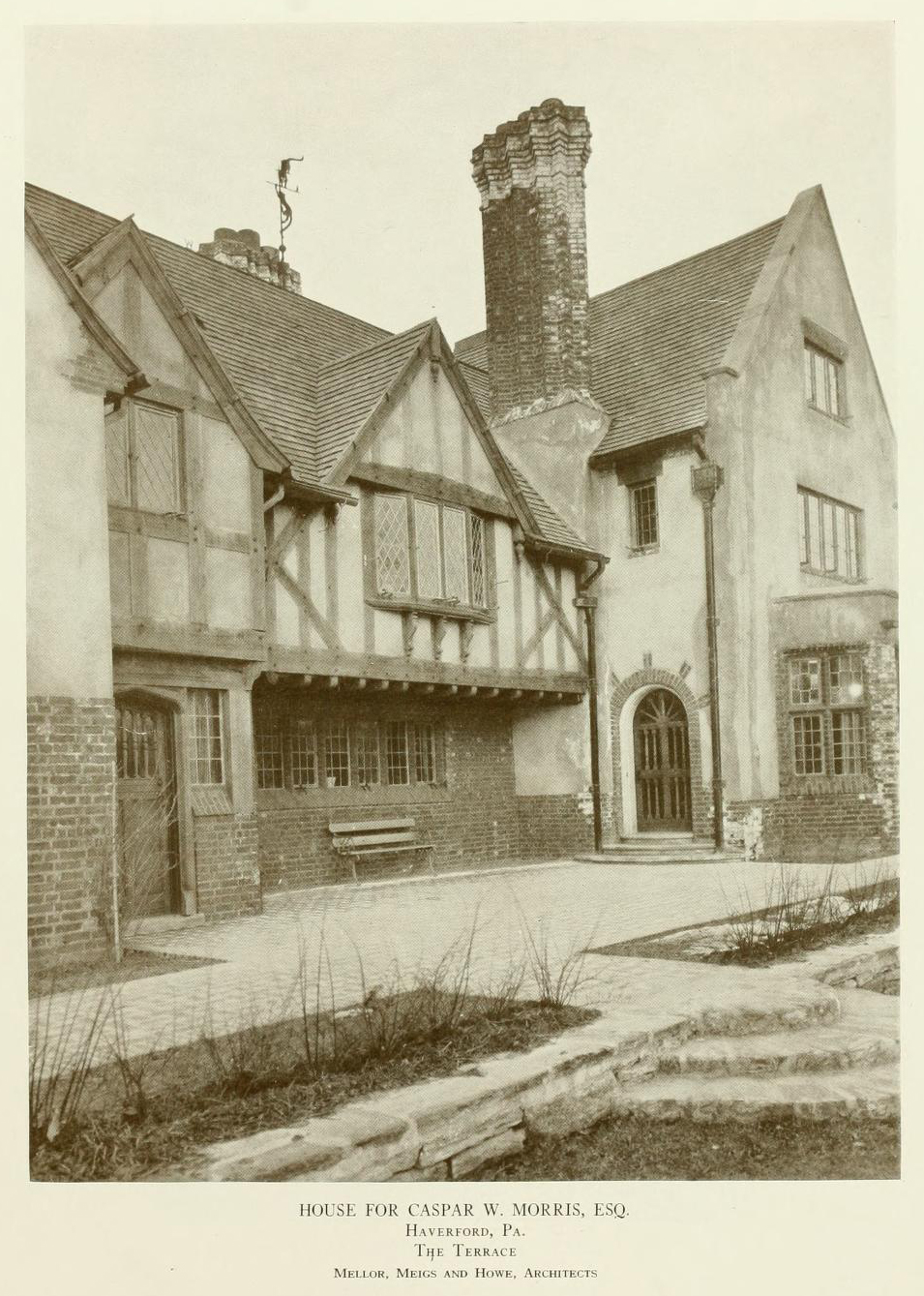
Caspar W. Morris residence (1914–17), Haverford, Pennsylvania

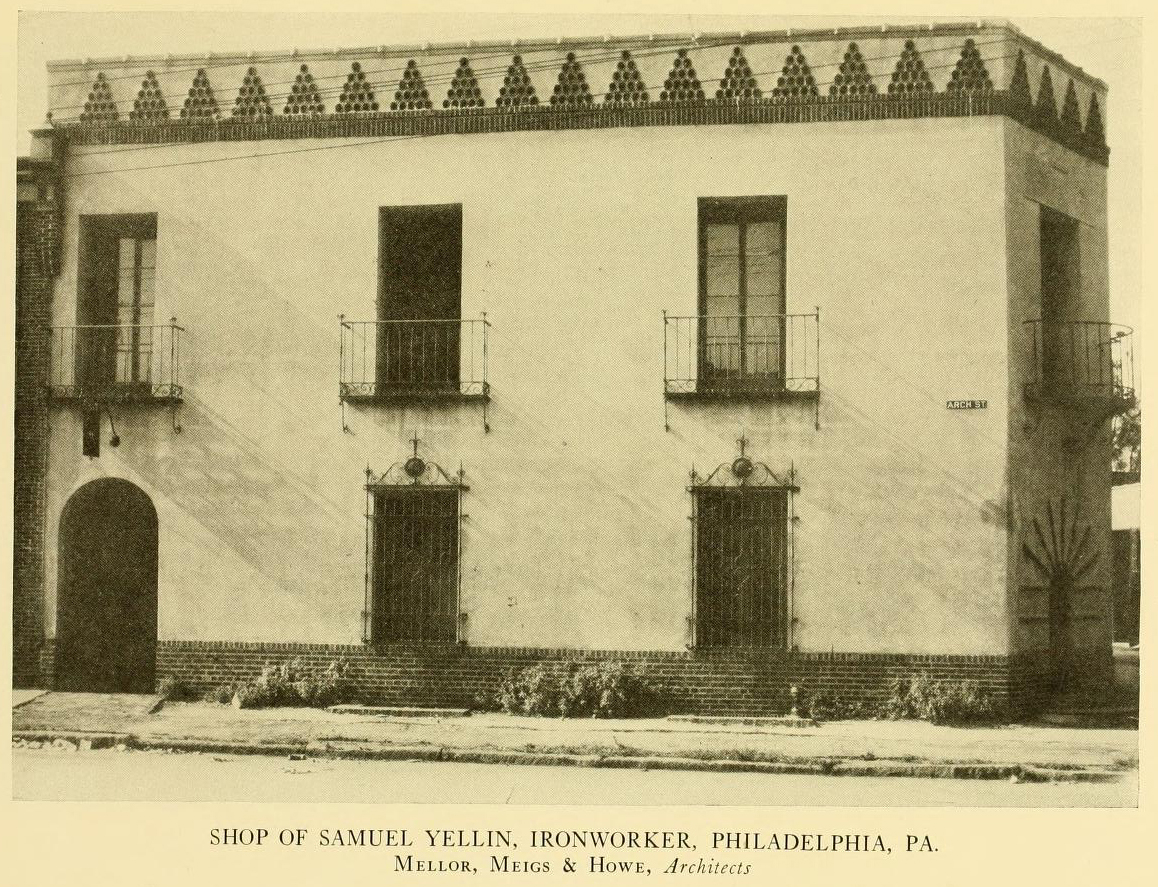
Yellin Shop (1915), West Philadelphia

=== Mellor, Meigs & Howe ===
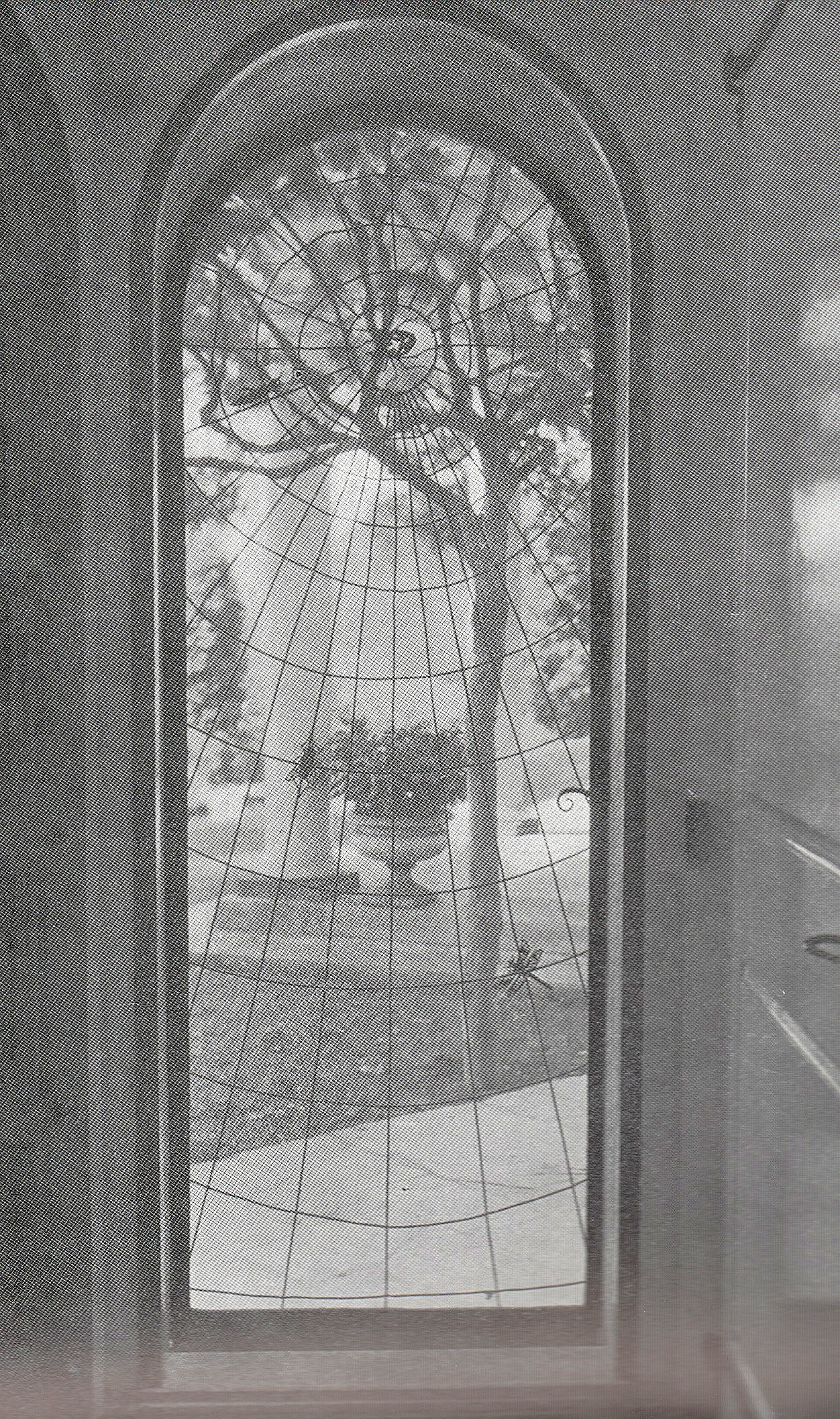
Spider screen by Samuel Yellin, Mrs. Arthur V. Meigs residence (1921), Radnor, Pennsylvania.

- "Ropsley," Francis I. McIlhenny residence (1916–18), 8765 Montgomery Avenue, Wyndmoor, Pennsylvania.
- "Garth," Robert T. McCracken residence (1919–21), 1009 Westview Avenue, Mount Airy, Philadelphia. 1922 Gold Medal, Philadelphia Chapter, American Institute of Architects.
- "Laverock Farm," Arthur E. Newbold Jr. residence (1919–25, demolished 1956), Willow Grove Avenue, Laverock, Pennsylvania. 1925 Gold Medal for Excellence in Design, Architectural League of New York.
- "The Peak," Mrs. Arthur V. Meigs residence (1921), 512 Chaumont Drive, Radnor, Pennsylvania. Includes the famous "Spider fly screen" by Samuel Yellin.
- "Oxmoor," Orville H. Bullitt residence and farm (1926), Skippack Pike, Whitemarsh, Pennsylvania.
- Marjorie Walter Goodhart Hall (1926–28), Bryn Mawr College, 150 N. Merion Avenue, Bryn Mawr, Pennsylvania.
- "Pheasant Run Farm," Robert L. McLean residence (1927–29), Sheaff Lane, Fort Washington, Pennsylvania.
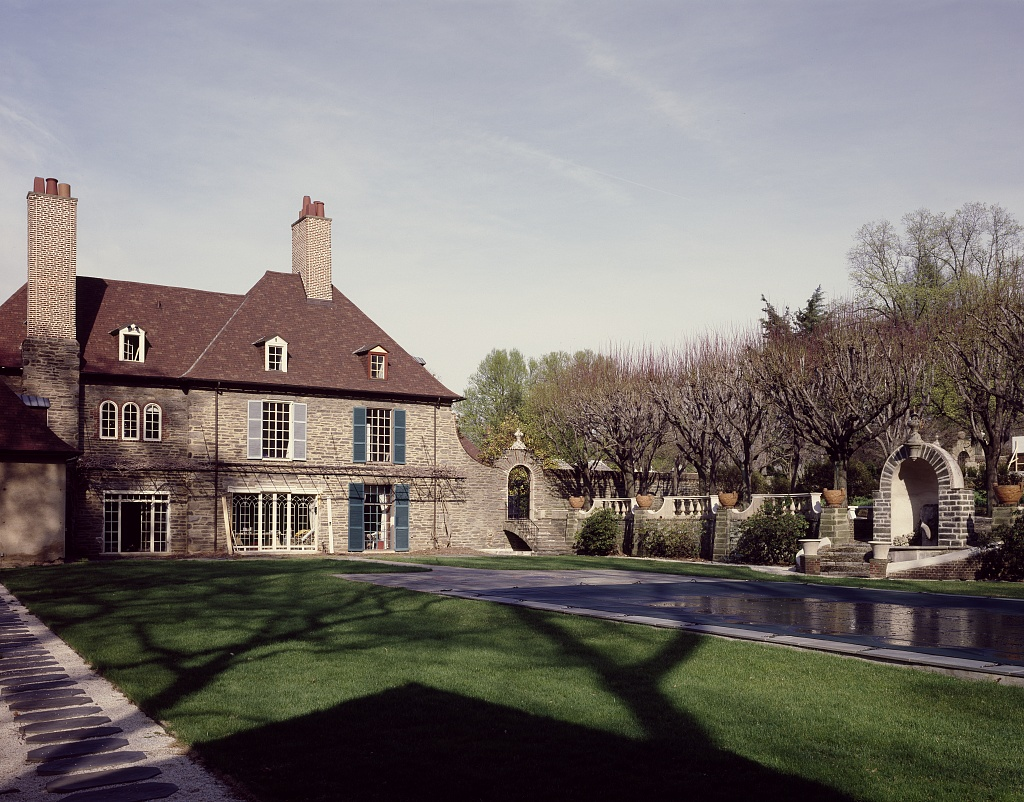
Ropsley (1916–18), Wyndmoor, Pennsylvania

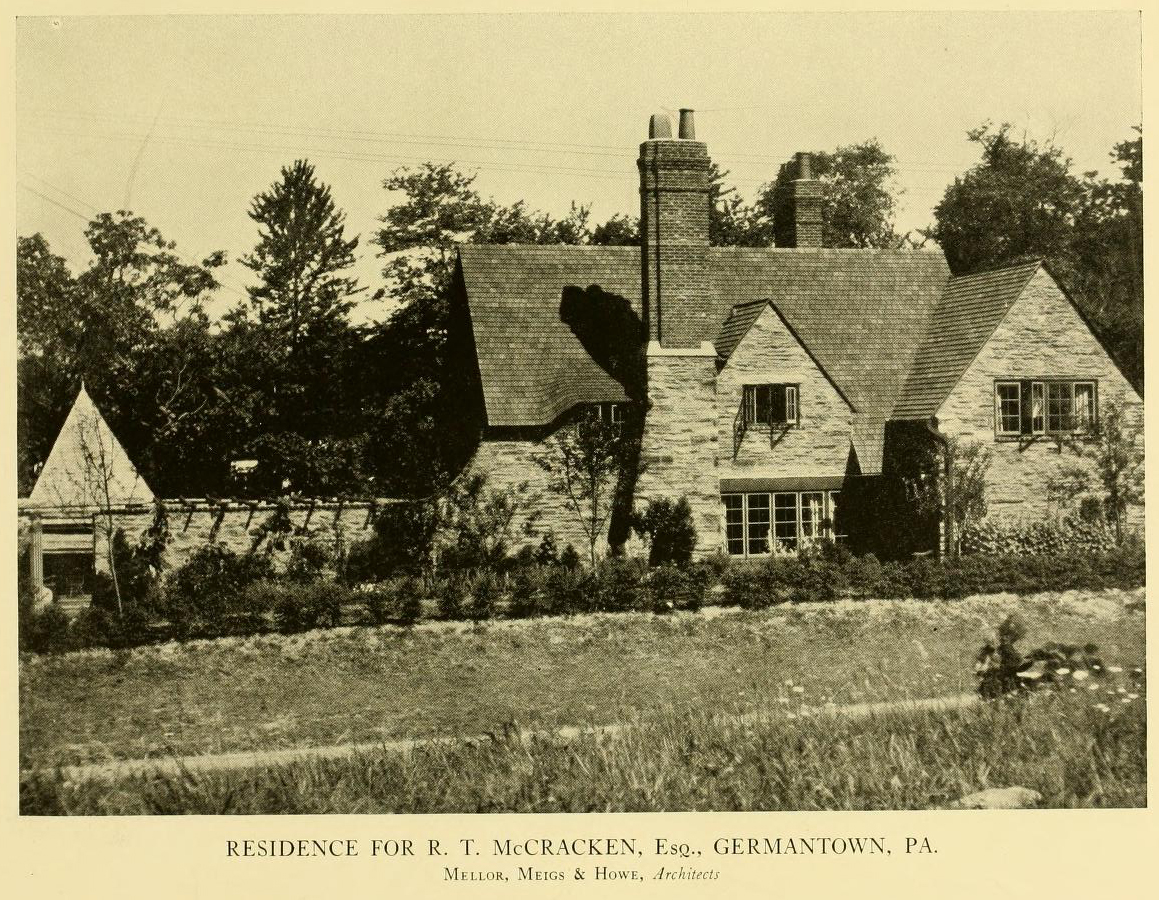
Robert T. McCracken residence (1919–21), Mount Airy, Philadelphia

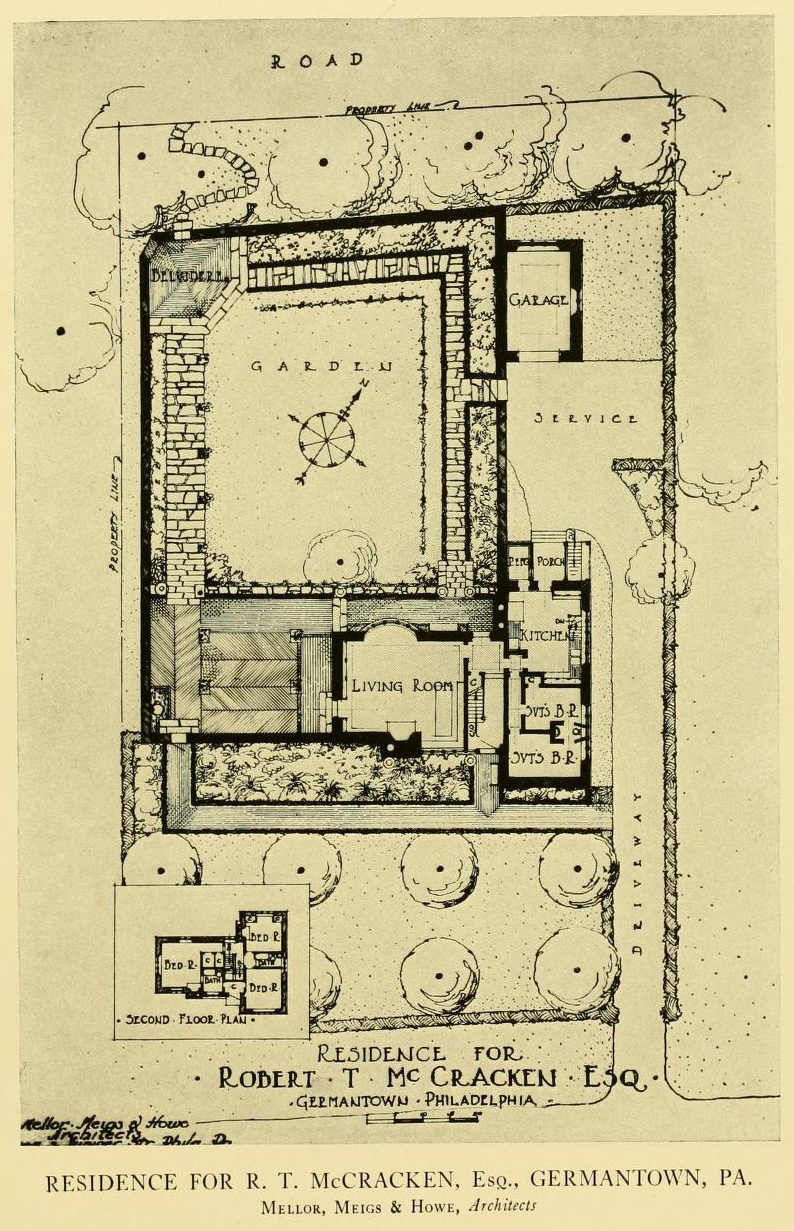
Plan for Robert T. McCracken residence (1919–21), Mount Airy, Philadelphia

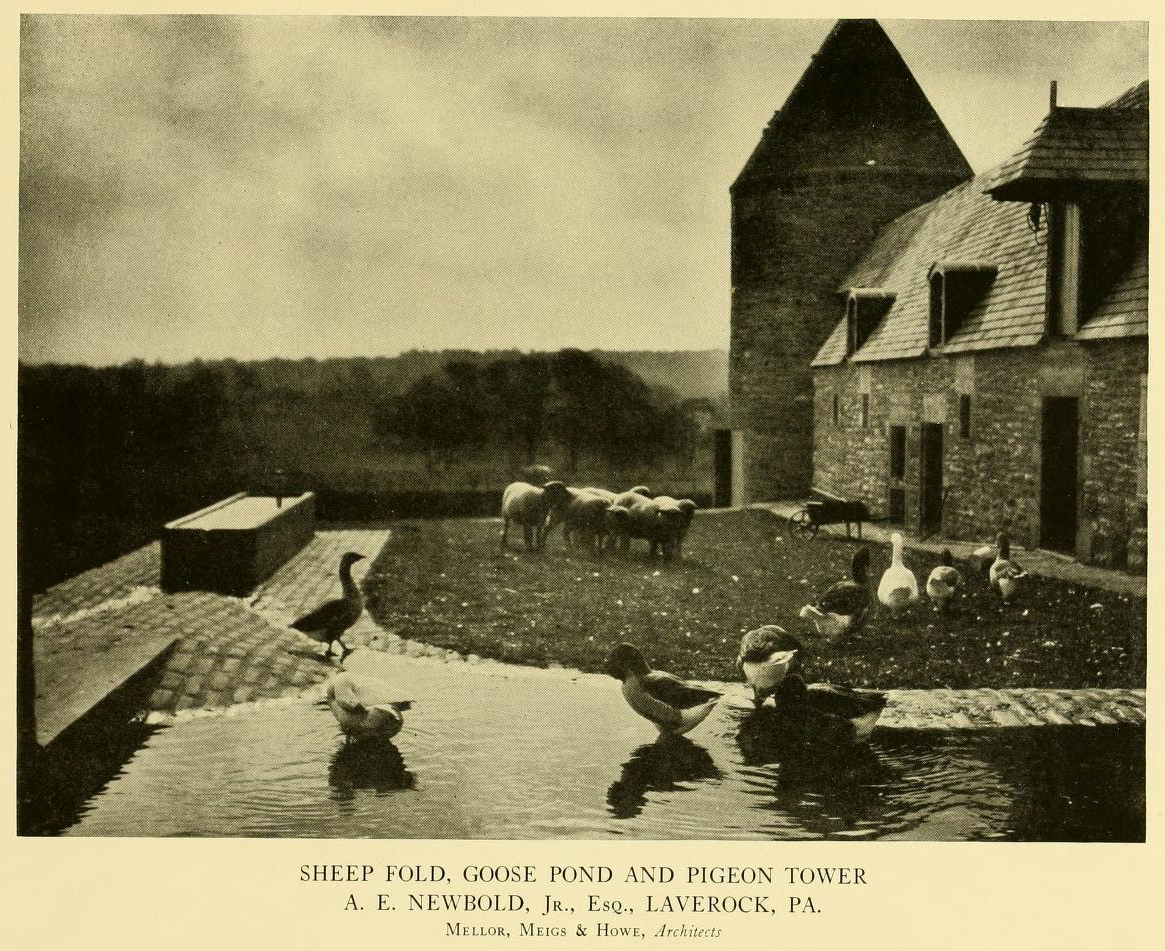
Laverock Farm (1919–25, demolished 1956), Laverock, Pennsylvania

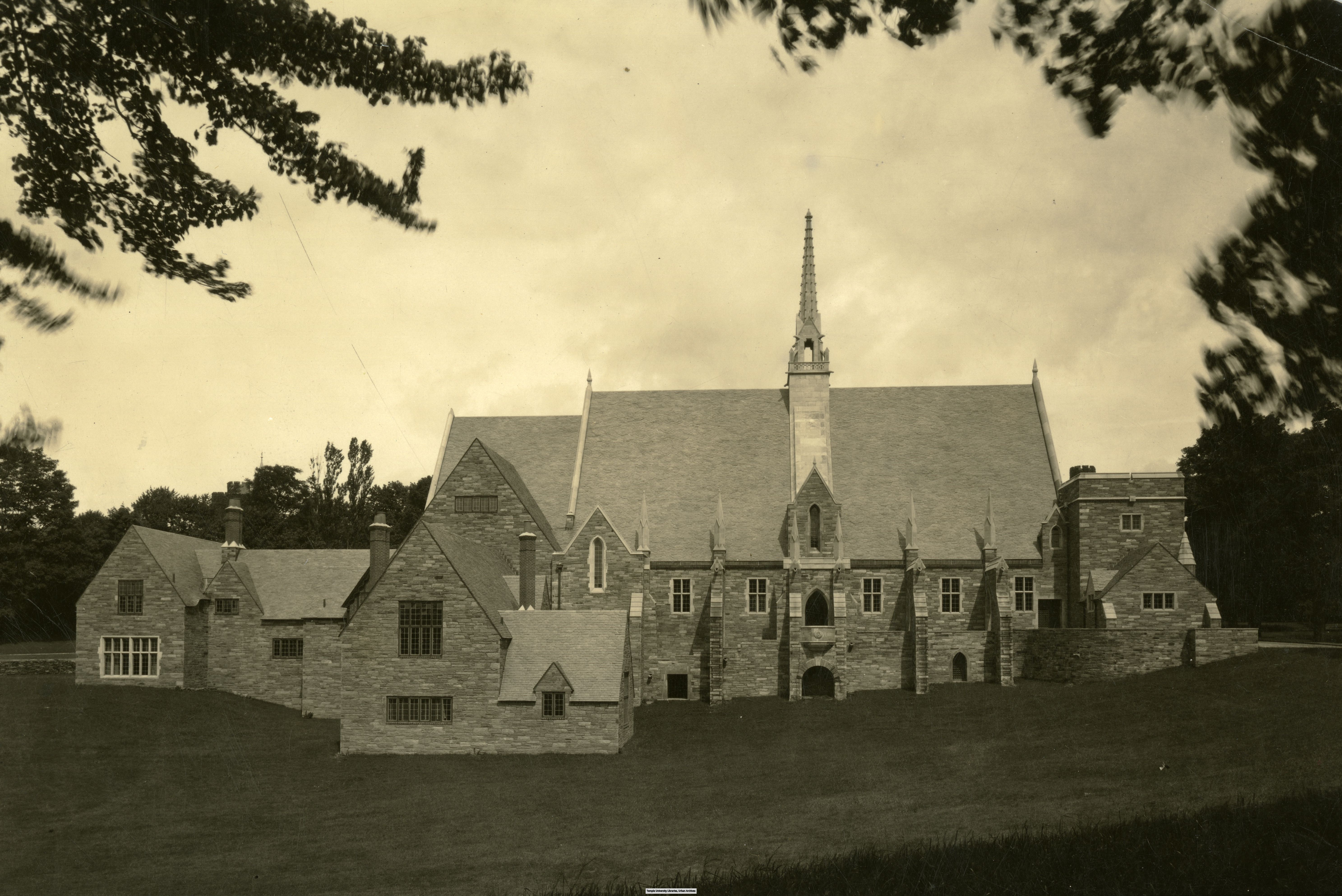
Goodhart Hall (1926–28), Bryn Mawr College, Bryn Mawr, Pennsylvania
