= Walter Mellor =

American architect (1880–1940)

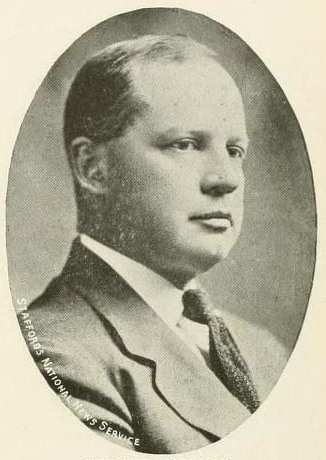
Walter Mellor, c. 1920

Walter Mellor (1880–1940) was an American architect.

== Biography ==
=== Early life ===
He was born on April 25, 1880, in Philadelphia, Pennsylvania. His father was Alfred Mellor and his mother, Isabella (Latham) Mellor. He graduated from The Haverford School in Haverford, Pennsylvania in 1897 and received a Bachelor of Science in Mechanical Engineering from Haverford College in 1901. He then earned a Bachelor of Science in architecture from the University of Pennsylvania in 1904. He was a member of the Phi Gamma Delta fraternity.

=== Career ===
Shortly after graduation, he worked for Theophilus P. Chandler Jr. (1845-1928), where he met Arthur Ingersoll Meigs (1882-1956). In 1906, they started their own architectural firm, with offices in the Lafayette Building. They worked on alterations of the Pickering Hunt Club in Phoenixville, Pennsylvania in 1911 and the Princeton Charter Club in Princeton, New Jersey in 1913. They also designed fraternity houses for Phi Gamma Delta and Haverford College.

In 1916, George Howe (1886–1955) joined their practice, which became Mellor Meigs & Howe. Together, they designed a branch office building for the Philadelphia Savings Fund Society. They also designed Phi Gamma Delta fraternity house at the University of Washington located at 5404 17th Avenue NE University District in Seattle, Washington. In 1922, the firm won an award from the Philadelphia chapter of the American Institute of Architects for the McCracken residence in Germantown, Philadelphia, and in 1925, the Gold Medal of the Architectural League of New York for the Newbold Estate development. In 1928, Howe left the practice.

He was a fellow of the American Institute of Architects and a member of the Philadelphia Art Alliance, the Union League of Philadelphia, the Philadelphia Zoological Society, the Germantown Cricket Club, the T-Square Club and the Mask and Wig Club. He served on the board of directors of the Kestner Evaporating Co. and on the board of trustees of the Cummington School in Massachusetts.

=== Personal life ===
He died on January 1, 1940.
