= Arthur Ingersoll Meigs =

American architect (1882–1956)

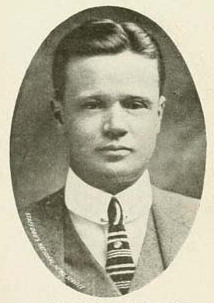
- Born: June 29, 1882; Philadelphia, Pennsylvania, US
- Died: June 9, 1956 (aged 73); Bryn Mawr, Pennsylvania, US
- Resting place: St. David's Episcopal Church, Wayne, Pennsylvania
- Education: William Penn Charter School; Princeton University
- Occupation: Architect
- Spouse: Harriet Gertrude Reed "Haddie" (Geyelin) Meigs
- Parent(s): Dr. Arthur Vincent Meigs; Mary Roberts (Browning) Meigs

Arthur Ingersoll Meigs (1882–1956) was an American architect.

He and his colleagues at Mellor, Meigs, and Howe were involved in the design and construction oversight of bank buildings, the students' hall at Bryn Mawr College, multiple personal residences of prominent individuals, and the United States Coast Guard's World War Memorial at Arlington National Cemetery, as well as a chapel at the Somme American Cemetery near Bony, France and a monument to the United States Army's Twenty-Seventh and Thirtieth Divisions between Ypres and Mount Kemmel, the latter two of which were commissioned by the American Battle Monuments Commission. The accomplishments of his firm were recognized with the Gold Medal of the Architectural League of New York and the Medal of the American Institute of Architects' Philadelphia chapter.

== Early life ==
Born in Philadelphia, Pennsylvania on June 29, 1882, Arthur I. Meigs was a son of Dr. Arthur Vincent Meigs and Mary Roberts (Browning) Meigs. He graduated from the William Penn Charter School in 1899 and from Princeton University in 1903.

== Career ==
From the summer of 1903 to September 1905, he worked for Theophilus P. Chandler Jr. (1845-1928). From October 1905 to June 1906, he worked for Edgar Viguers Seeler (1867-1929).

Meigs started an architectural practise with Walter Mellor in 1906. Later in 1916, George Howe (1886–1955) joined their practise as Mellor, Meigs & Howe, up until 1928. Together, they designed Phi Gamma Delta fraternity house at the University of Washington located at 5404 17th Avenue NE University District in Seattle, Washington. In 1913 he designed the Princeton Charter Club, one of the Eating clubs at Princeton University.

Meigs' architectural work was briefly placed on hold during World War I while he served as a captain with an artillery unit in the United States Army.

By the early 1930s, Meigs had become prominent enough nationally that he began writing articles for publications in city newspapers. In November 1930, his article, "Simplicity Is Secret Of Beautiful Home: R. T. McCracken, Germantown, Pa., Has Achieved Striking Results on Limited Ground" which was published in The Buffalo News, presented a number of insights, including the following:

"'Garth' means a piece of ground, usually small, set aside or enclosed by a wall or other barrier. It is a descriptive name, and modest, for a modest place, the house of Robert T. McCracken, Germantown, Pa.
The property is divided into three spaces—the front, which is occupied by an orchard, the garden, and the service, located on the northeast side and so small that one has to look for it. Simple materials have been used throughout—a yellowish field stone, most of which was obtained from the cellar excavation, for the walls; brick chimney and shingle roof, and the interior walls of the three principal rooms downstairs are treated with a cement plaster treated by the masons, with a troweled finish and of a putty color.
The grape room, located to the southwest of the dining room, is paved with brick, as is the path on the front of the house, while the garden paths are of flagstone.
House Has Accent.
The entrance drive, which is but 40 feet long and serves only as a place to run a car in and back out again, is paved with pink Belgian blocks, which lend color, texture and tidiness to the whole operation of entering....
If the McCracken house has an accent, it is the fusion of house and garden. Neither the one nor the other would stand by itself....
It is an age of specialization, and specialists, but disadvantages, as well as advantages accrue from everything we attempt. If we specialize we pay a price, and specialization in art is dangerous.
The results of the centralized control in Mr. McCracken's house may be good or bad, in accordance with what anybody chooses to think; but one thing is certain, and that is that everything that was done in and about it carried with it the interest of both the architect and the owner."

In 1932, Meigs designed the new Friendfield House on the Friendfield Plantation near Georgetown, South Carolina. He designed an expansion to the Federal-style Brooklawn mansion in Chester County, Pennsylvania, in 1931.

In 1940, Meigs attended the seventy-second national convention of the American Association of Architects in Louisville, Kentucky.

After Mellor's death in 1940, Meigs worked with Edward F. Hoffman Jr. (1888-1971) and semi-retired.

Meigs was a member of the Philadelphia chapter of the American Institute of Architects, the Athenaeum of Philadelphia and the Radnor Hunt Club.

== Horse racing ==
During the 1930s and 1940s, Meigs purchased and entered horses in steeplechase and hunt races, as well as horse shows. In September 1930, he road his horse, Madrigal, in jumping events at the Bryn Mawr Horse Show. In 1934, Meigs' four-year-old brown gelding, Ortheris, won the Twelfth Annual Up-Country Hunter and Pony Show.

In April 1936, his horse, El Rey Keno, won the first steeplechase race ever held on the grounds of Land Hope, his estate near Unionville, Pennsylvania. Several thousand spectators attended the private race in which fourteen horses vied for victory.

In 1939, Meigs' horse, Red Ned, won by eight lengths at Broad Axe, bringing home the Harston Cup during the Whitemarsh Valley Hunt; however, tragedy struck when another of his horses, Michaelangelo, fell and broke its back during a jump in the Skippack Plate contest that same day.

In October 1941, he entered his horse, Militiades, in the Huntingdon Valley Hunt races. The next month, his "black fencer," Coq Noir, won the Pickering Challenge Cup at Valley Forge.

== Personal life and death ==
In March 1926, Meigs' brother, John Forsythe Meigs II, died from pneumonia at the age of 45.

Meigs married Harriet Gertrude Reed "Haddie" (Geyelin) Meigs (1893-1971) on September 13, 1935. They honeymooned in Bermuda. During the 1930s and 1940s, he and his wife lived in Radnor, Pennsylvania on an estate known as "The Peak" and at "Land Hope," their estate in Unionville. In the summer of 1941, they leased Whetstone, a home in Newport, Rhode Island that was owned by Dr. and Mrs. Owen J. Toland.

During the winter of 1941, Meigs inherited roughly $200,000, following the death of his mother.

Meigs suffered a cerebral hemorrhage at his estate, The Peak, in Radnor, Pennsylvania, and was transported to the Bryn Mawr Hospital, where he died on June 9, 1956. He and his wife are buried in the cemetery of St. David's Episcopal Church in Wayne, Pennsylvania.

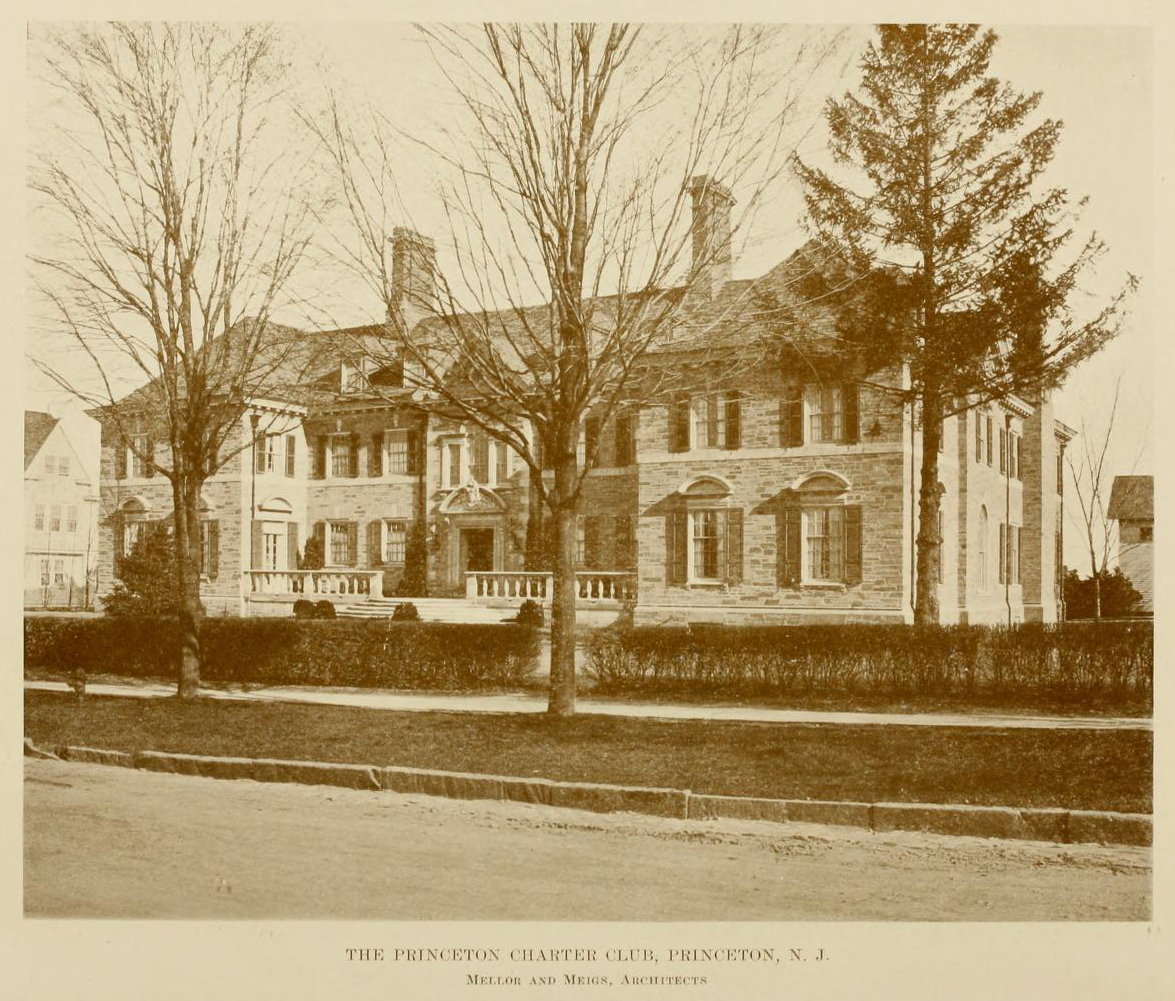
Princeton Charter Club (1913), Princeton University, Princeton, New Jersey

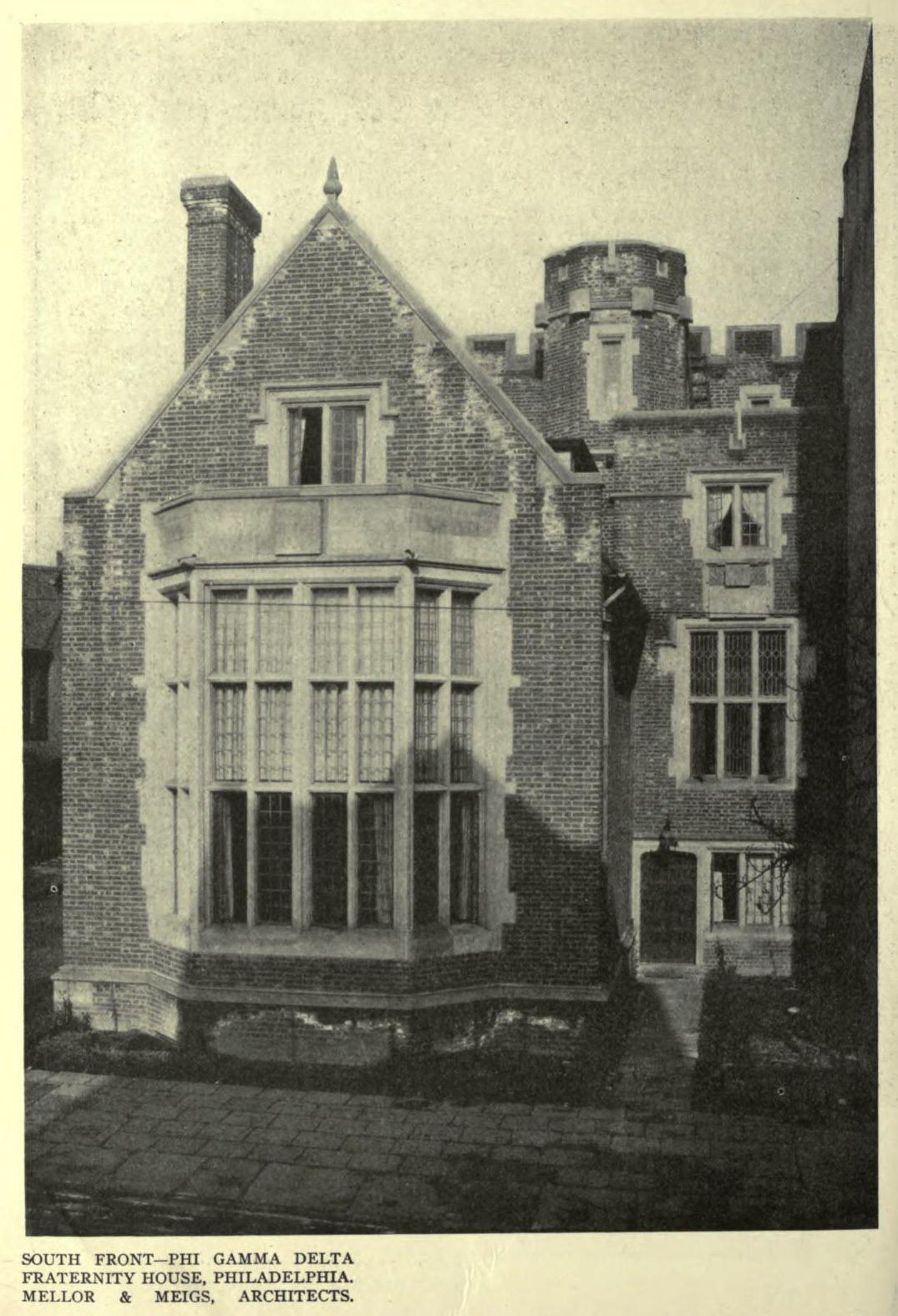
Phi Gamma Delta Fraternity House (1916), University of Pennsylvania, Philadelphia
