= The Antagonists (Gann novel) =

1971 historical novel by Ernest K. Gann

- First edition (publ Simon & Schuster)
- Author: Ernest K. Gann
- Language: English
- Genre: Historical novel
- Publication date: 1971
- Publication place: United States
- Media type: Print (hardcover and paperback)
- Followed by: The Triumph (1986)
- The novel was adapted into the television miniseries Masada in 1981.

The Antagonists is a 1971 historical novel by Ernest K. Gann telling a fictionalized account of the siege of the Masada citadel in Israel by the 10th Legion of the Roman Empire in AD 73. The novel was adapted as a television miniseries, Masada, broadcast first in 1981. The two antagonists of the title are Eleazer ben Yair, leader of the Jewish Zealots who make a final stand on Masada; and the Roman general Flavius Silva.

A sequel, entitled The Triumph, was published in 1986.

== Overview ==
The novel explores the themes of leadership and patriotism by comparing and contrasting the two protagonists/antagonists of the story. Little survives from history, so the account is heavily fictionalized.

== See also ==
- The Dovekeepers (novel)
