= Pillage of Ein Gedi =

Sicarii raid on Ein Gedi during the First Jewish–Roman War (67 CE)

- Location: Ein Gedi, Roman Judea
- Date: Passover, 67 CE
- Target: Jewish residents of Ein Gedi
- Attack type: Mass Killings
- Deaths: 700
- Perpetrators: Sicarii rebels, coming from Masada
- Motive: Pillage

The Pillage of Ein Gedi refers to the Sicarii raid of Ein Gedi during the First Jewish–Roman War. According to Josephus, on Passover, the Sicarii of Masada raided Ein Gedi, a nearby Jewish settlement, and killed 700 of its inhabitants. Josephus' account is the only known record of the pillage and its perpetrators. Pliny the Elder however described the destruction of Ein Gedi after the end of the war:

Below the settlement of the Essenes was once the village of Ein Gedi, second only to Jerusalem (Carei Jericho) in fertility of soil and groves of palm trees. But now it, like Jerusalem (Jericho), is but a heap of ashes

— Naturalis Historia 5: 73

The excavation of a miqve in Ein Gedi revealed a large concentration of pottery sherds and stone tools on the floor, which had been covered by a layer of collapsed debris showing evidence of a heavy conflagration. It is possible that this represents the destruction inflicted by the Sicarii during the Great Revolt.

== See also ==
- Siege of Masada
- Zealots (Judea)
