= A Voz dos Deuses =

1984 novel by João Aguiar

- Author: João Aguiar
- Language: Portuguese
- Subject: Pre-Roman Culture and Conquest of the Iberian Peninsula by Rome
- Genre: Historical fiction
- Published: 1984
- Publication place: Portugal
- Media type: Print (hardback and paperback)
- Pages: 291
- ISBN: 843-50-0587-9
- Followed by: Uma Deusa na Bruma (A Goddess in the Mist)

A Voz dos Deuses (The Voice of the Gods) (ISBN 843-50-0587-9) is a historic novel by João Aguiar about the Lusitanian War. It takes the form of the written memories of Tongius, a Roman-Hispanic citizen and the high priest of the temple of Endovelicus in Lusitania, who relates his life, including his birth in the tribe of the Cynetes, his encounter with Lusitanian chieftain Viriathus, and his role as Viriathus's comrade-in-arms in the battle against the Roman Republic.

The novel is considered one of the most successful Portuguese historical novels in the 20th century, and has been attributed an important role in reshaping the figure of Viriathus in Portuguese and Spanish popular culture. It was also cited by Portuguese musician Jorge Salgueiro as the inspiration of his 1ª Sinfonia.

A loose sequel, A hora de Sertorio, was published by Aguiar in 1994.

== Plot summary ==
The narrator is Tongius, the elderly high priest of Endovelicus, who is committed to write down the story of his life before dying. He tells how he was born to a Bracari father exiled from his tribe, Tongetamus, and the Cynete woman who accepted him into her tribe, Camala. After his father's death, the teenaged Tongius becomes a merchant like his uncle Camalus and travels through Turdetania and other places, until circumstances make him clash with the Roman authorities in Gadir. Taking refuge on the sanctuary of Endovelicus in Lusitanian lands, Tongius later joins a marauder army commanded by Curius and Apuleius, who plan to adhere a Lusitanian alliance of tribes bent on get revenge of Rome. The first battles are unsuccessful, but the coalition is saved from a Roman trap in Tribola by the military genius of a captain, Viriathus, who is elected their leader. Tongius joins Viriathus as a lieutenant thanks to his abilities as a healer and translator.

Tongius follows Viriathus in his adventures through the Iberian peninsula, defeating the Roman forces in many battles and visiting other tribes to get alliances with other oppressed tribes. Along the way, he befriends especially two veterans, Ardunus and Crissus, and meets many women and lovers, like Sunua and Crovia. He attends also to Viriathus' marriage with the daughter of a Lusitanian aristocrat, Astolpas, and is forced to work with three ambitious Turdetanian warriors, Audax, Ditalcus and Minurus, who seemingly support their cause. After an alliance with the Celtiberian tribes in Numantia, caused by the efficient attack of Roman general Quintus Fabius Maximus Aemilianus, the heroes are set on what appears to be the final stage of the war against his relative, Quintus Fabius Maximus Servilianus, who has arrived to Iberia to take down Viriathus. In another proof of his military skill, Viriathus corners Servilianus with his army and forces him to sign a peace accord, turning Viriathus into a true ruler of lands and an ally of Rome.

However, peace is brief, as the next Roman general, Quintus Servilius Caepio, breaks the treaty and starts waging war on the Lusitanians again. Relationships among the heroes weaken as Viriathus negotiaties with Caepio, and after the situation becomes more complicated, Viriathus is murdered by Audax and his aides, likely bribed by Caepio. Command now falls on Viriathus' second-in-command, Tautalus, who decides to surrenders to Caepio and accept his terms under the threat of waging a suicide war. After the war, Tongius lives a long life, even becoming a Roman citizen, until he settles down in the sanctuary of Endovelicus. The novel ends many years later, when a Roman lieutenant named Hirtuleius finds the memories and notes a prophecy mentioned by Tongius that seems to refer to his commander, Quintus Sertorius.

== Characters ==
- Tongius – The story's protagonist.
- Camala – Tongius' mother and a healer.
- Viriathus – Chief of the Lusitanians.
- Tautalus – Second-in-command to Viriathus.
- Ardunus – A Vetton soldier and healer under Viriathus.
- Crissus – A Turduli chieftain under Viriathus.
- Audax, Ditalcus and Minurus – Turdetanian allies to Viriathus.
- Curius and Apuleius – Lusitanian chieftains.
- Astolpas – A Lusitanian rich man.
- Crovia – Priestess of the Great Goddess in Baikor.
- Quintus Fabius Maximus Servilianus – A Roman consul.
- Quintus Servilius Caepio – A Roman consul.

== Composition ==
In a 1984 interview in the Jornal de Letras, Aguiar revealed the reasons that led him to write the novel. He sought to recover a lost conscience of his Portuguese ancestry.

"I became tired at the small dimension we give to ourselves, at how lowly we regard ourselves. We lost the empire, poor of us; we never found comfort again; we accepted to be the dustbin of Europe, an anecdote of Europe. I had a burst of anger: is it so that we are nothing? We who own a palace are convinced that we own a pigpen!

— Fernando Dacosta, Jornal de Letras, 1984

== Reception ==
The novel was an economical and critical success. It would go to receive 15 editions in the first decade after its release in 1984, with critics praising Aguiar's extensive historical research, accessible writing style and avoidance of political clichés. Although less so than in its native Portugal, the novel was also praised in Spain, where it was published in 1993 under the name Viriato. Iberia contra Roma ("Viriathus – Iberia vs. Rome").

Writer and critic António Quadros saw A Voz dos Deuses as an innovative work within Portuguese literature. He described it as, "a deep dive in the sea of our collective memory, a search of the very foundations of being Portuguese through being Lusitanian, its ancestor." Quadros saw the novel's Viriathus as a model of hero in the tradition of Thomas Carlyle and Max Scheler, standing out not only due to his bravery, but also to his spiritual intelligence. He also praised Aguiar's humanization of Viriathus in his historical context, even within his heroic exaltation.

In his review in El País, critic Jacinto Antón praised the novel as a demystification of Viriathus which, in turn, only makes his image even more powerful. According to him, the story "presents a Viriathus far away from the cliché of the rude shepherd that defeats his enemies through sheer racial fury. To Aguiar, Viriathus... was a man of the plains and not a savage highlander, a man forged in the varied and rich cultural influences that converged in the peninsula at his time."

According to Miguel Real, Aguiar deconstructs the patriotic, nationalistic image attributed to Viriathus in the 16th century, making him return to an Iberian or Hispanic state not bound to any nationality. He also saw a "mental portrait of the constellation of values of Portugal in the last 30 years, transposed, as far as history allows, to the land of Lusitania from middle 2nd century BC." Just as Portuguese people born in the 1950s saw their traditional values challenged by European and American currents, the character of Ardunus is quoted as, "I don't want to live in this world, Tongius – I only know how to live with the gods and the simple, sacred laws of my tribe."

Authors also noted the book to innovate in presenting a perspective from conquered peoples. It drew comparisons to Ernest K. Gann's The Antagonists (1971) and Guy Ratchet's Massada: Les guerriers de Dieu (1979), as well as the posterior Druids by Morgan Llywelyn (1990).

== Adaptations ==
The novel received a stage adaptation in 2003 by Diogo Freitas de Amaral.
