= João Aguiar =

João Aguiar may refer to:

- João Aguiar (writer) (1943–2010), Portuguese writer and journalist
- João Aguiar (swimmer) (born 1983), Angolan swimmer
