= The Dovekeepers (novel) =

2011 historical novel by Alice Hoffman

- US First edition (publ. Scribner)
- Author: Alice Hoffman
- Publication date: October 4, 2011
- ISBN: 978-1-4516-1747-4

The Dovekeepers is a 2011 historical novel by American writer Alice Hoffman. The novel tells a fictionalized account of the Siege of Masada (73–74 A.D.) by troops of the Roman Empire towards the end of the First Jewish–Roman War (66–73 A.D.).

== Television film ==
A two-part television adaptation of the same name from executive producers Roma Downey and Mark Burnett premiered in the United States on March 31, 2015, on CBS. It stars Cote de Pablo as Shirah.

== See also ==
- List of historical novels
- Masada – a 1981 television dramatization of the events at Masada
