= The Dovekeepers =

- Genre: Biblical; Historical Drama
- Based on: The Dovekeepers by Alice Hoffman
- Teleplay by: Ann Peacock
- Directed by: Yves Simoneau
- Starring: Cote de Pablo; Rachel Brosnahan
- Composer: Jeff Beal
- Country of origin: United States
- Original language: English

Production
- Executive producers: Roma Downey; Mark Burnett; John Weber; Frank Siracusa; Yves Simoneau
- Production locations: Malta; Jordan; Israel
- Cinematography: Guy Dufaux
- Editors: Sylvain Lebel; Isabelle Malenfant
- Running time: 180 minutes
- Production companies: Take 5 Productions; Whiz Bang Films; Lightworkers Media; CBS Television Studios

Original release
- Network: CBS
- Release: March 31 – April 1, 2015

The Dovekeepers is a two-part television adaptation of on the 2011 novel of the same name by Alice Hoffman. It features a fictionalized account of the Siege of Masada by troops of the Roman Empire towards the end of the First Jewish–Roman War. The program premiered in the United States on March 31, 2015 on CBS.

== Plot ==
According to the official trailer,

From the producers of The Bible, comes the story of a place called Masada, where three extraordinary women faced an army of thousands. A healer accused of witchcraft. An outcast haunted by her past. A woman with the heart of a warrior.

The trailer featured the tagline, "Their journey. Their passion. It all leads up to this. Take a stand."

== Main cast ==
- Cote de Pablo as Shirah
- Rachel Brosnahan as Yael
- Kathryn Prescott as Aziza
- Diego Boneta as Amram
- Sam Neill as Flavius Josephus
- Mido Hamada as Eleazar ben Ya'ir
- Sam Hazeldine as Flavius Silva
- Jonas Armstrong as Yoav
- Luke Roberts as Jachim Ben Simon
- Fiona O'Shaughnessy as Channa
- Andrei Claude as Sa' Adollos
- Kenneth Spiteri as Claudius
- Diarmaid Murtagh as Wynn
- Manuel Cauchi as Josef Bar Elhanan
- Andre Agius as Adir
- Marama Corlett as Sia

== Episodes ==
No.	Title	Original release date	Viewers (millions)
1	"Part 1"	March 31, 2015	8.99
Roman historian Flavius Josephus chronicles the lives of three Jewish women during the Romans' siege of Masada in A.D. 73, where more than 900 Jews were able to take refuge at the fortress for months. But first he pressures two of them into telling their versions of the story; Shirah, believed to be the witch of Moab, and Yael, an outcast to her father and neighbors. In order to tell the story, they must first go back to the beginning and share accounts of their pasts.
2	"Part 2"	April 1, 2015	6.40
Shirah and Yael remain in the custody of Flavius Josephus in his house in Rome. They tell of how Shirah's warrior daughter, Aziza joins them in their duty of keepers of the messenger doves in their home. Roman commanders Flavius Silva and Claudius devise a plan in how to get their soldiers into Masada. But to the Jewish sicarii, it's "freedom or death" as they hole up in the last Jewish fortress in Judea before the fateful day of the siege.

== Reception ==
The adaptation garnered negative reviews: Keith Uhlich of The Hollywood Reporter writes "True to its title, this romantic-historical miniseries is more fowl than fair. CBS' two-part adaptation of Alice Hoffman's best-selling novel is a cheap, chintzy adventure." while Brian Lowry of Variety writes "Designed to play as a moving adaptation of Alice Hoffman's bestseller, The Dovekeepers is more of a wounded duck."

== See also ==
- Masada, a 1981 television dramatization of the events at Masada
