= Siege of Masada =

Siege marking the end of the First Jewish–Roman War

- Part of the First Jewish–Roman War
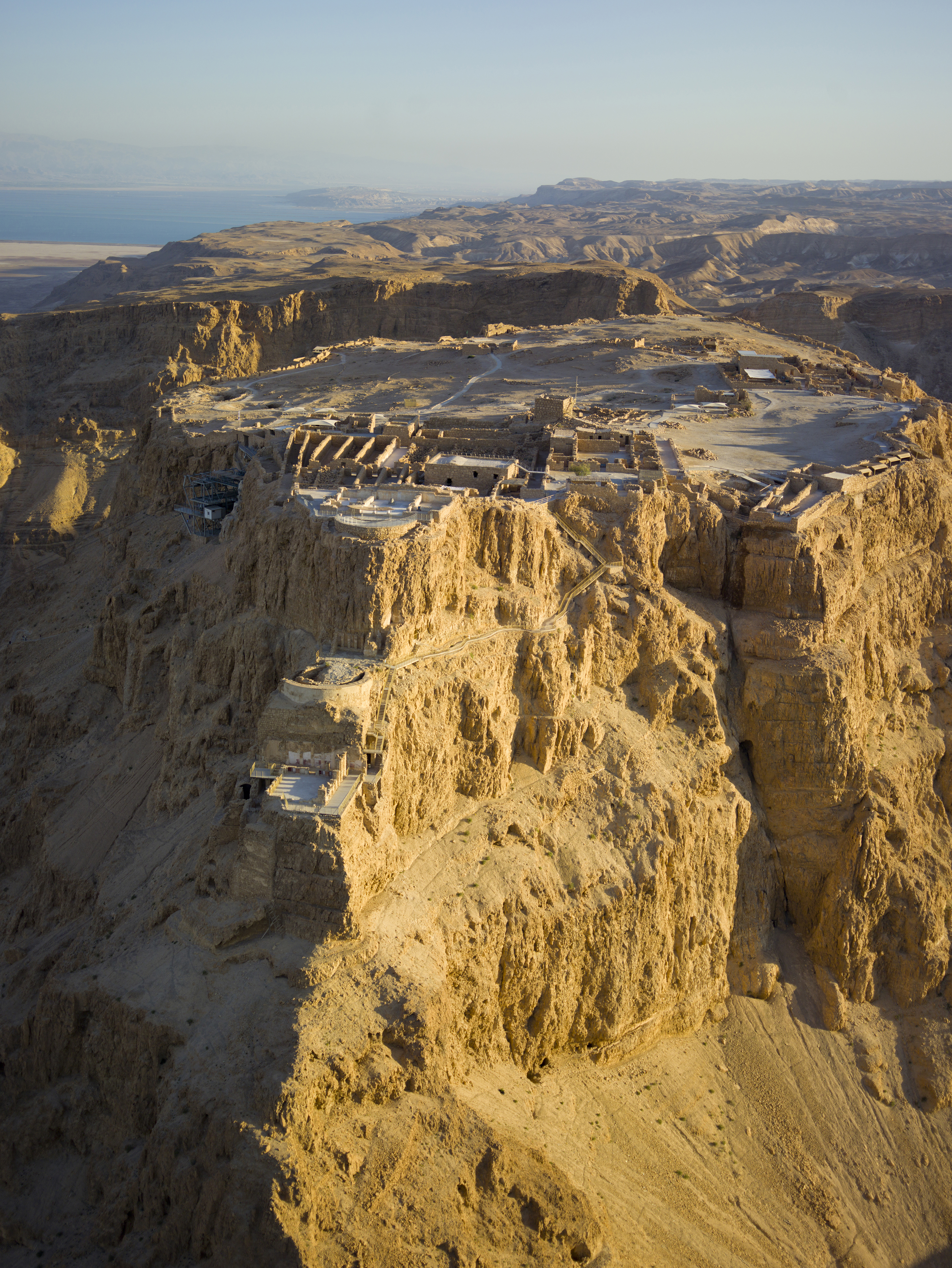
- Masada National Park
Date	Late 72 – early 73 (traditional date); Late 73 – early 74 AD (proposed date)
Location	Masada, Israel (then part of Judaea Province) 31°18′56″N 35°21′13″E
Result	Roman victory

Belligerents
Jewish Sicarii	Roman Empire

Commanders and leaders
Eleazar ben Ya'ir †	Lucius Flavius Silva

Strength
967, including non-combatants	Legio X Fretensis 4,800; Auxiliaries and slaves 4,000–10,000

Casualties and losses
960 dead, 7 captured (2 women, 5 children), according to Josephus	Unknown

The hilltop fortress of Masada, in present-day Israel, was successfully besieged and taken by Roman imperial forces between 72 and 73 AD, during the final period of the First Jewish–Roman War. At the time, the fortress was held by members of the Sicarii rebel group. The siege is recorded by a single contemporary written source, The Jewish War by Josephus. According to Josephus, the long siege ended with the mass suicide of the Sicarii and resident Jewish families.

In modern times, the story of the siege was revived as the Masada myth, a selectively constructed narrative based on Josephus's account. The mythical narrative became a national symbol in the early years of Israel's nationhood.

== Background ==
Masada has been described as "a lozenge-shaped table-mountain" that is "lofty, isolated, and to all appearance impregnable". Historically, the fortress could be reached only by a single pathway that was too narrow for men to walk abreast. This pathway was named "the Snake" for the way it twists and zig-zags to the summit. Masada was named as the place where David rested after fleeing from his father-in-law, King Saul.

Flavius Josephus, a Jew born and raised in Jerusalem, is the only historian to provide a detailed account of the First Jewish–Roman War and the only person who recorded what happened on Masada. After being captured during the Siege of Yodfat and then freed by Vespasian, Josephus chronicled the Roman campaign. Josephus presumably based his narration on the field commentaries of the Roman commanders.

According to Josephus, Masada was first constructed by the Hasmoneans. Between 37 and 31 BC Herod the Great fortified it as a refuge for himself in the event of a revolt. In 66 AD, at the beginning of the First Jewish–Roman War, a group of Jewish extremists called the Sicarii overcame the Roman garrison of Masada and settled there. The Sicarii were commanded by Eleazar ben Ya'ir, and in 70 AD they were joined by additional Sicarii and their families expelled from Jerusalem by the Jewish population with whom the Sicarii were in conflict.

Shortly thereafter, following the Roman siege of Jerusalem and subsequent destruction of the Second Temple, additional members of the Sicarii and many Jewish families fled Jerusalem and settled on the mountaintop, with the Sicarii using it as a refuge and base for raiding the surrounding countryside.

According to Josephus, on Passover, the Sicarii raided Ein Gedi, a nearby Jewish settlement, and killed 700 of its inhabitants.

Archaeology indicates that the Sicarii modified some of the structures they found at Masada. These include a building that was modified to function as a synagogue. It may in fact have been a synagogue to begin with, although it did not contain a mikvah or the benches found in other early synagogues. It is one of the oldest synagogues in Israel.

== Siege ==
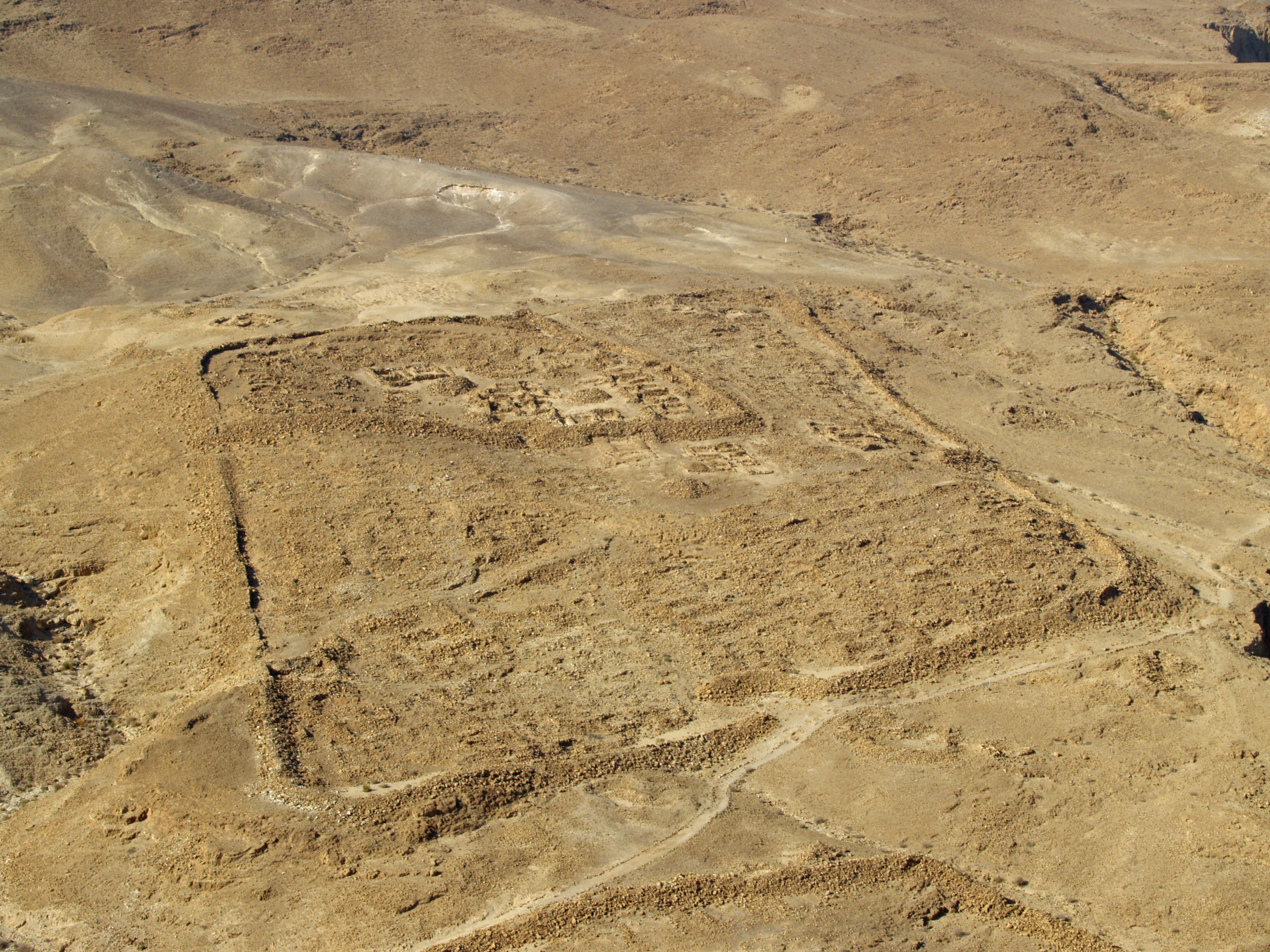
Remnants of Camp F, one of several legionary camps just outside the circumvallation wall around Masada

In 72 AD, the Roman governor of Judaea, Lucius Flavius Silva, led Roman legion X Fretensis, a number of auxiliary units and Jewish prisoners of war, totaling some 15,000 men and women, of whom an estimated 8,000 to 9,000 were fighting men, to lay siege to the 960 people in Masada.

According to military strategist Edward Luttwak, the Roman effort at Masada, deploying vast resources and engineering ingenuity to eliminate a small pocket of resistance in an isolated desert fortress of no strategic importance, may have been intended as a message to those considering rebellion: the Romans would relentlessly pursue and crush rebels, even at great cost, to eradicate any trace of resistance.

The Roman legion surrounded Masada and built a circumvallation wall, before commencing construction of a siege ramp against the western face of the plateau, moving half a million tons of earth. Josephus does not record any attempts by the Sicarii to counterattack the besiegers during this process, a significant difference from his accounts of other sieges of the war.

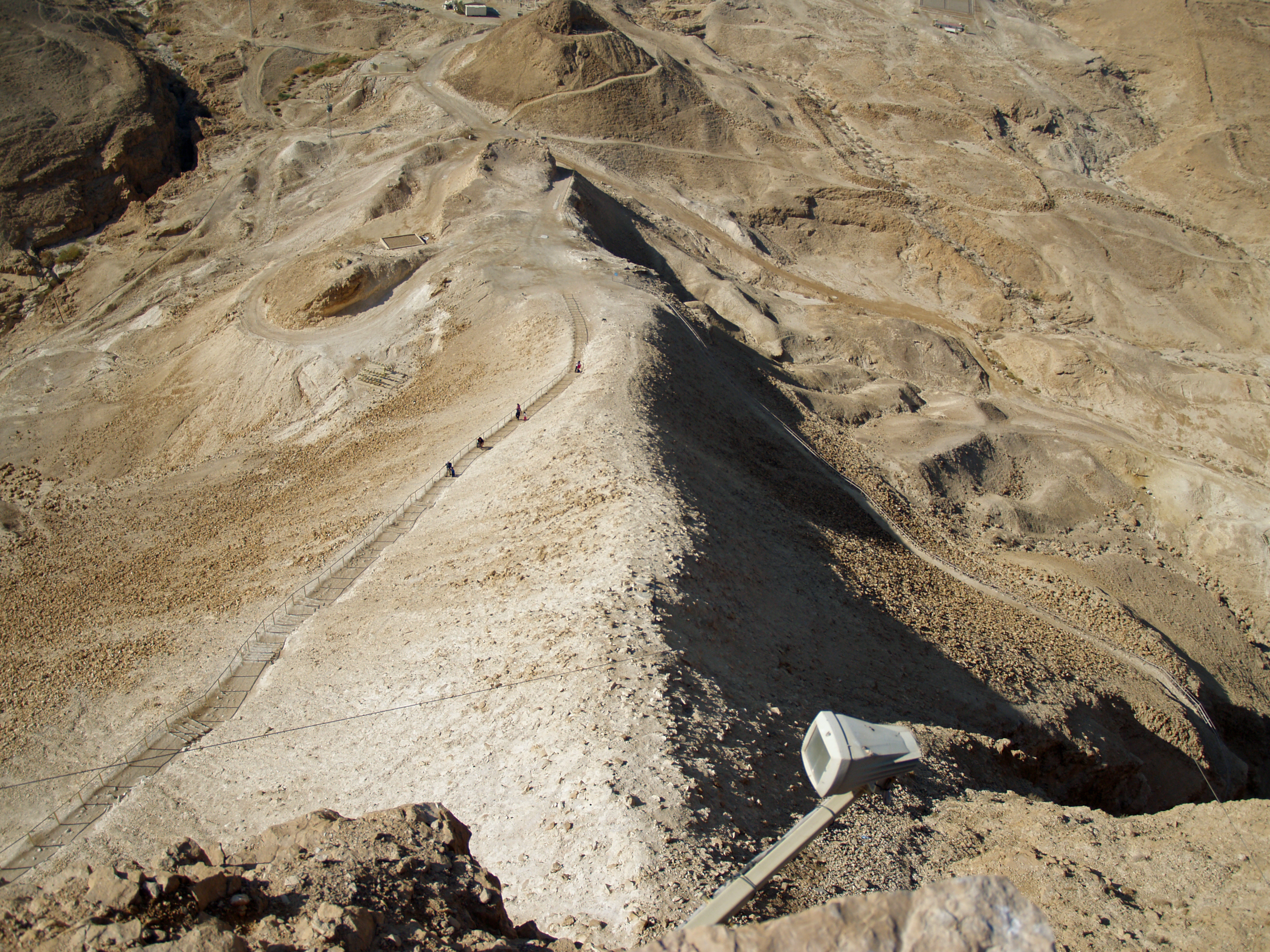
The Roman siege ramp seen from above. This was partly rebuilt for a 1981 TV miniseries, Masada.

The ramp was completed in the spring of 73, after probably two to three months of siege. A giant siege tower with a battering ram was constructed and moved laboriously up the completed ramp, while the Romans assaulted the wall, discharging "a volley of blazing torches against ... a wall of timber", allowing the Romans to breach the wall of the fortress on April 16, 73 AD.

== Mass suicide narrative and debate ==
=== Josephus's narrative ===
According to Josephus's account, when the Romans finally entered Masada, they found it to be "a citadel of death". The Jewish rebels had set all the buildings but the food storerooms ablaze and had killed each other, declaring "a glorious death ... preferable to a life of infamy".

=== Scholarly analysis ===
Historian Menahem Stern treated the mass suicide as historical and saw it as a direct expression of the Fourth Philosophy tradition founded by Judas of Galilee, the spiritual father of the Sicarii movement and ancestor of its leader at Masada, Eleazar Ben Yair. The fighters faced a choice between death and accepting Roman rule, which in their eyes amounted to chillul hashem (desecration of God's name), since they recognized God alone as lord and refused to serve any mortal. Stern noted that even those willing to submit could expect only enslavement, while women faced sexual disgrace as well. He noted that suicide during the First Jewish Revolt was also attested by Josephus in Gamla and Yodfat in 67 CE, and by both Josephus and Cassius Dio during the burning of the Jerusalem Temple in 70 CE. He compared the situation to that of Jewish communities in the Rhineland massacres of 1096 and those of the York massacre in 1190, suggesting the same impossible choice between death and dishonor. At the same time, he also observed that Eleazar's speech bears a strong imprint of Greek Stoic philosophy and literary conventions common in the Roman Empire, alongside the ideas of the Fourth Philosophy.

Siege of Masada, 1727 engraving by Matthijs Pool

According to Shaye Cohen, archaeology shows that Josephus' account is "incomplete and inaccurate" and contradicted by the "skeletons in the cave, and the numerous separate fires". Cohen speculates that "some Jews killed themselves, some fought to the death, and some attempted to hide and escape. The Romans were in no mood to take prisoners and massacred all whom they found."

According to Kenneth Atkinson, there is no "archaeological evidence that Masada's defenders committed mass suicide." According to archaeologist Eric H. Cline, Josephus' narrative is impossible because the Romans would have immediately pressed their advantage, leaving no time for Eleazar's speech or the mass suicides. Instead, Cline proposes that the defenders were massacred by Romans.

American archaeologist Jodi Magness has written that archaeology cannot prove or disprove the account of Josephus because the human remains found can be interpreted differently.

The Masada site was extensively excavated between 1963 and 1965 by an expedition led by Israeli archaeologist and former military Chief-of-Staff Yigael Yadin.

== Masada myth ==
The Masada myth is the early Zionist retelling of the Siege of Masada, a selectively constructed narrative based on Josephus's account, with the Sicarii instead depicted as national heroes, and in which the Sicarii were described as a splinter group of the Zealots.

The siege of Masada and the resulting Masada myth is often revered in modern Israel as "a symbol of Jewish heroism". In the aftermath of the Holocaust, and the reported role of a poem about Masada in inspiring the Warsaw Ghetto Uprising, the story's themes of resilience and isolation resonated with and circulated in Israeli public discourse, youth movements, and film media. According to Klara Palotai, "Masada became a symbol for a heroic 'last stand' for the State of Israel and played a major role for Israel in forging national identity."

To Israel, it symbolized the courage of the warriors of Masada, the strength they showed when they were able to keep hold of Masada for almost three years, and their choice of death over slavery in their struggle against an aggressive empire. Masada had become "the performance space of national heritage", the site of military ceremonies. Palotai states how Masada "developed a special 'love affair' with archeology" because the site had drawn people from all around the world to help locate the remnants of the fortress and the battle that occurred there.

=== In works ===
- Masada: An Historical Epic, 1927 poem by Yitzhak Lamdan
- The Antagonists (novel), 1971 novel
- Masada (miniseries), 1981 American miniseries
- The Dovekeepers, 2011 novel
- The Dovekeepers, 2015 miniseries

== See also ==
- Jewish–Roman wars
- Zealots (Judea)
- Miła 18, Jewish resistance in the Warsaw Ghetto

International:

- Siege of Numantia, Roman siege in Hispania ending in mass suicide
- Teutons: Mass suicide of the women of the Teutones
- Puputan, Balinese term for a mass ritual suicide
- Destruction of Psara, a similar heroic mass suicide in modern Greek history
