= Masada cableway =

Cable car in Israel

Coordinates: 31°18′44.43″N 35°21′41.57″E

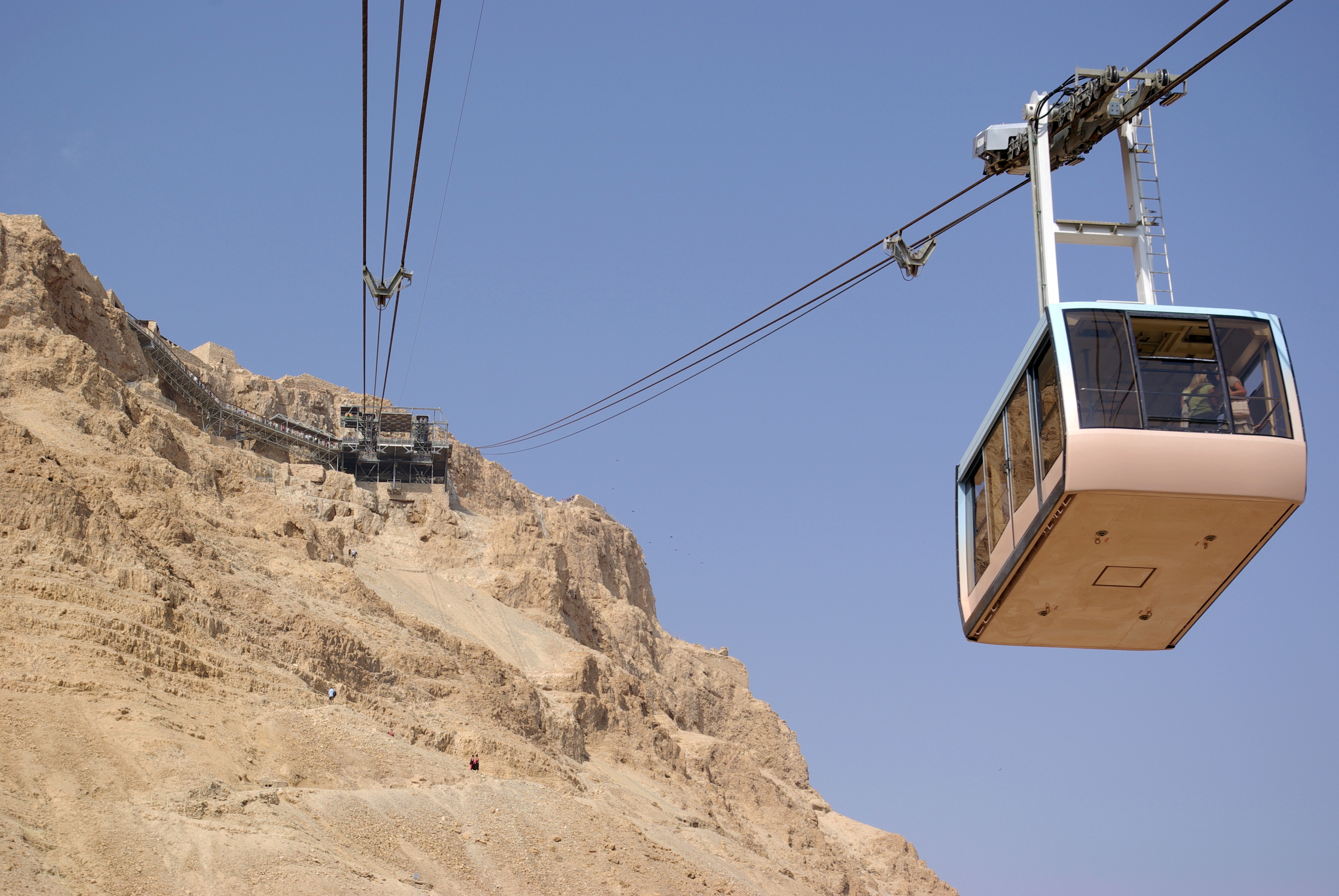
- Interactive map of Masada cableway

Overview
- Status: Operating
- Location: Masada, Israel
- No. of stations: 2
- Open: 1998

Operation
- Owner: Israel Nature and Parks Authority
- Operator: Israel Nature and Parks Authority

Technical features
- Aerial lift type: Aerial tramway
- Line length: 0.9 km
- Operating speed: 28.8 km/h
- Notes: elevation 33 m

The Masada cableway is an aerial tramway at the ancient fortress of Masada, Israel.

== History ==
The cableway was built in 1971 by the Karl Brändle company of Switzerland to carry people to the ruins at the top of the plateau. It had one aerial tramway support pillar and two cabins with a length of 900 metres and an elevation change of 290 metres. It was replaced in 1998 by an aerial tramway built by Von Roll without any support pillar, thus allowing the cabin's hanger to completely enclose the two track ropes and the haul rope. Its bottom station is 257 m below and its summit station is 33 metres above sea level, thereby making it the lowest aerial tramway in the world.

The cars run every fifteen (15) minutes during operating hours.

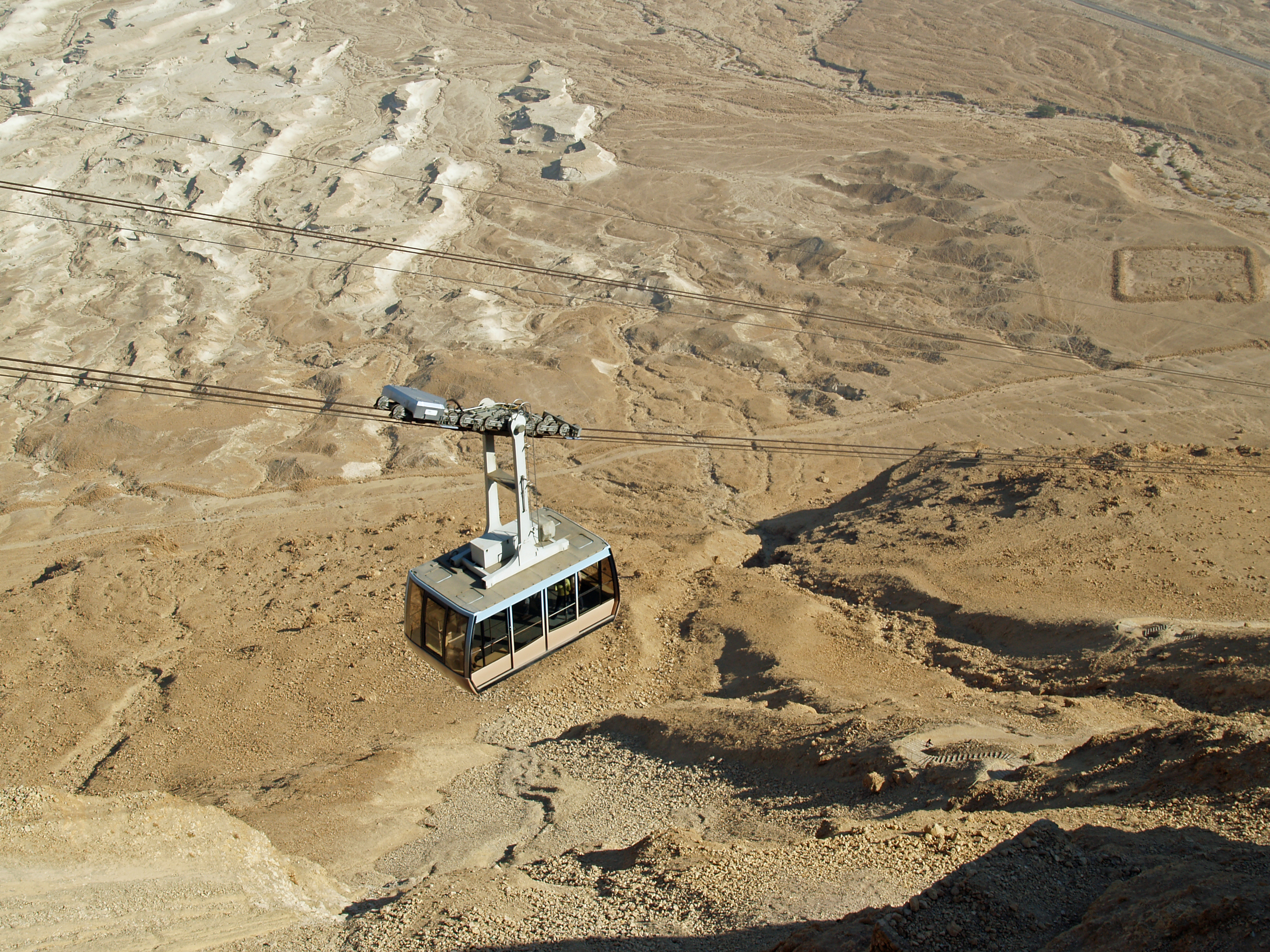

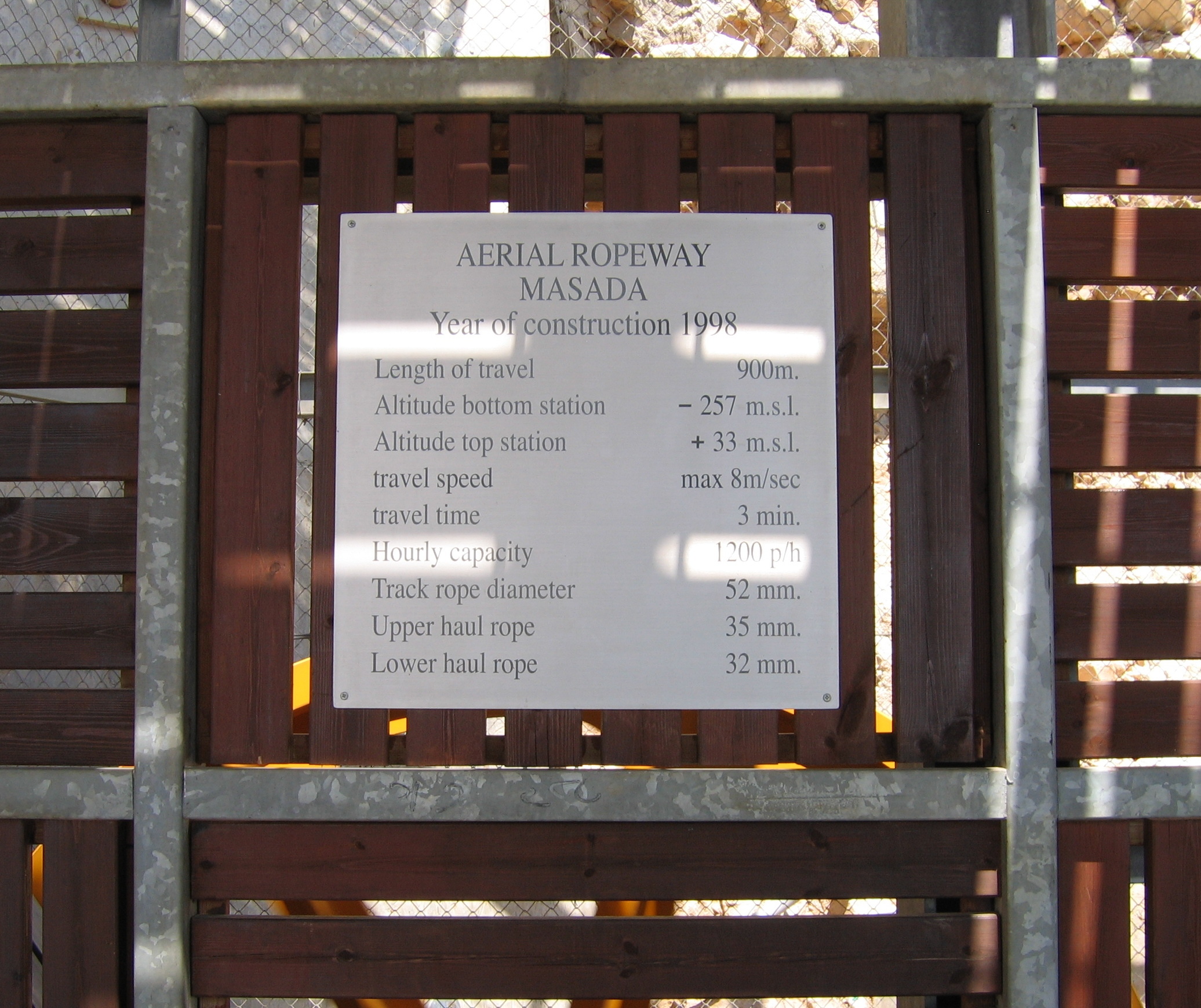

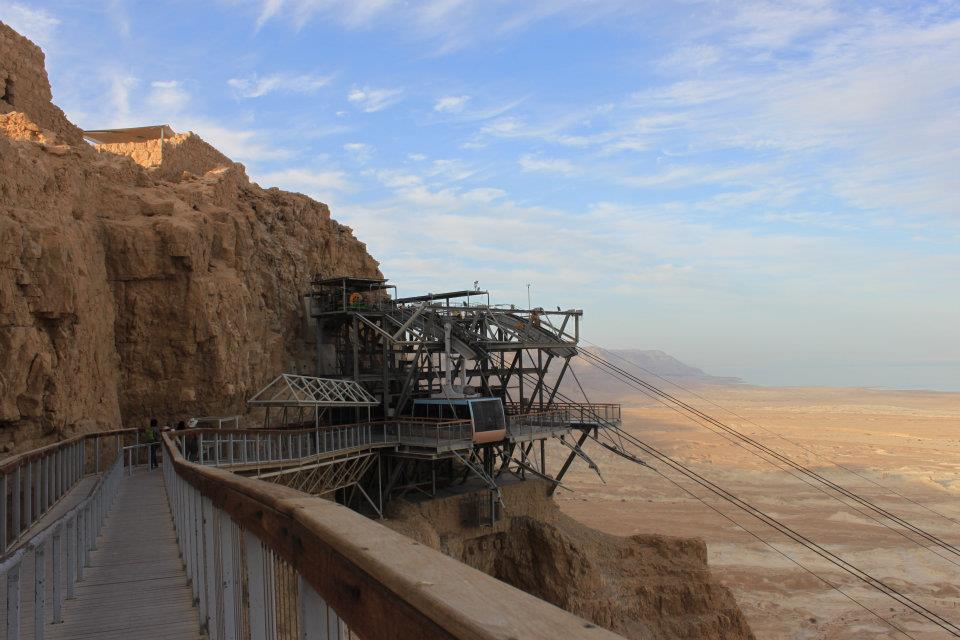

== See also ==
- Tourism in Israel
