= Masada =

Ancient hilltop fortification in Israel

- מצדה (Hebrew)
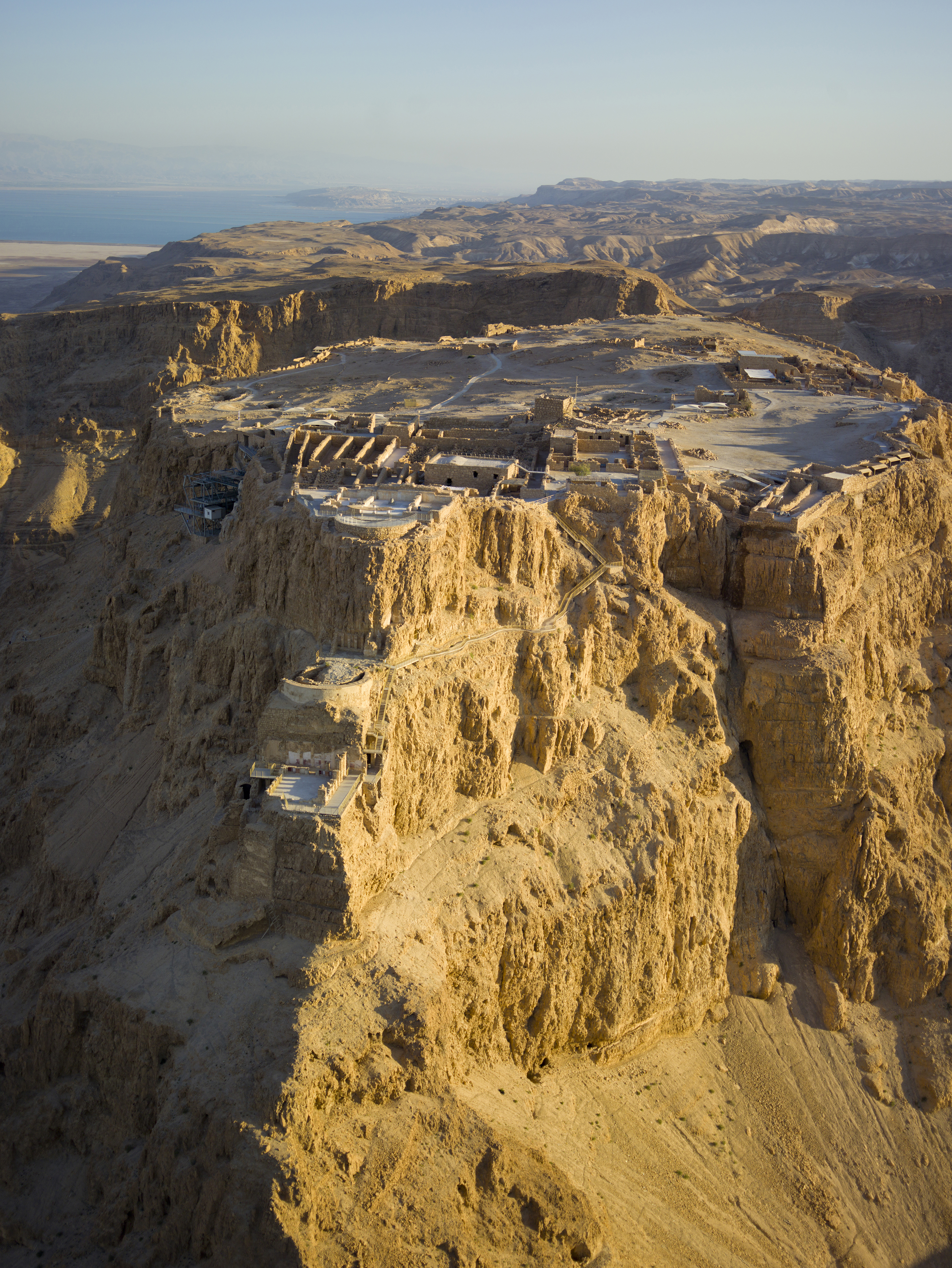
- An aerial view of Masada, from the north

- Location within Israel
- 31°18′56″N 35°21′14″E
- Type: Fortification
- Location: Southern District, Israel
- Region: Judaean Desert

History
- Built: 1st century BC
- Built by: Alexander Jannaeus (?); Herod the Great
- Event: Siege of Masada

Site notes
- Excavation dates: 1963–1965
- Archaeologists: Yigael Yadin

UNESCO World Heritage Site
- Criteria: Cultural: iii, iv, vi
- Reference: 1040
- Inscription: 2001 (25th Session)
- Area: 276 ha (680 acres)
- Buffer zone: 28,965 ha (71,570 acres)

Masada (Hebrew: מְצָדָה məṣādā, 'fortress'; Arabic: جبل مسعدة, romanized: jabal musayda, lit. 'mount museida') is a mountain-top fortress complex in the Judaean Desert, overlooking the western shore of the Dead Sea in southeastern Israel. The fort, built in the first century BC, was constructed atop a natural plateau rising over 400 m (1,300 ft) above the surrounding terrain, 20 km (12 mi) east of modern Arad.

The most significant remains at the site date to the reign of Herod the Great, King of Judaea under Roman administration c. 37–4 BC, who transformed Masada into a fortified desert refuge early in his rule. He enclosed the summit with a casemate wall and towers, and constructed storerooms, an advanced water system, and bathhouses, along with two elaborate palaces: one on the western side and another built across three terraces on the northern cliff. These palaces remain among the finest examples of Herodian architecture.

Masada is most renowned for its role during the First Jewish–Roman War (66–73 AD), when it became the final holdout of Jewish rebels following the destruction of Jerusalem. A group known as the Sicarii, a radical faction led by Eleazar ben Ya'ir, defended the site against the Roman Tenth Legion under Lucius Flavius Silva. The Romans laid siege by building a circumvallation wall and a massive ramp. According to Josephus, when the walls were breached in 73/74 AD, the Romans found nearly 1,000 inhabitants had died by mass suicide—a claim that remains debated among historians. In modern times, the story of Masada was interpreted as a symbol of heroism that became influential in early Israeli national identity.

Excavations led by archaeologist Yigael Yadin in the 1960s uncovered remarkably preserved remains, including Herod's palaces, storerooms with food remnants, ritual baths, a synagogue, Jewish scrolls, columbaria, and pottery shards bearing names, one inscribed "ben Ya'ir," possibly linked to the final days of the defenders, and a small Byzantine church. The surrounding Roman siege works and bases remain visible and are among the most intact examples of Roman military engineering. Today, Masada is a UNESCO World Heritage Site due to those siege works, and one of Israel's most popular tourist attractions, drawing around 750,000 visitors a year.

== Geography ==
The cliff of Masada is, geologically speaking, a horst. As the plateau abruptly ends in cliffs steeply falling about 400 m (1,300 ft) to the east and about 90 m (300 ft) to the west, the natural approaches to the fortress are very difficult to navigate. The top of the mesa-like plateau is flat and rhomboid-shaped, about 550 m (1,800 ft) by 270 m (890 ft). Herod built a 4 m (13 ft) high casemate wall around the plateau totaling 1,300 m (4,300 ft) in length, reinforced by many towers. The fortress contained storehouses, barracks, an armory, a palace, and a series of cisterns (capacity around 40,000 m^{3}; 1.4 million cu ft) that were refilled by rainwater – with the runoff collected from a single day's rain allegedly able to sustain over 1,000 people for 2 to 3 years. Three narrow, winding paths led from below up to fortified gates.

== History ==
Almost all historical information about Masada comes from the first-century Jewish Roman historian Josephus. Masada is also mentioned in the Judean Desert Documents.

=== Hasmonean fortress ===
Josephus writes that the site was first fortified by Hasmonean ruler Alexander Jannaeus in the first century BC. However, so far no Hasmonean-period building remains could be identified during archaeological excavations.

Josephus further writes that Herod the Great captured it in the power struggle that followed the death of his father Antipater in 43 BC. It survived the siege of the last Hasmonean king Antigonus II Mattathias, who ruled with Parthian support.

=== Herodian palace-fortress ===
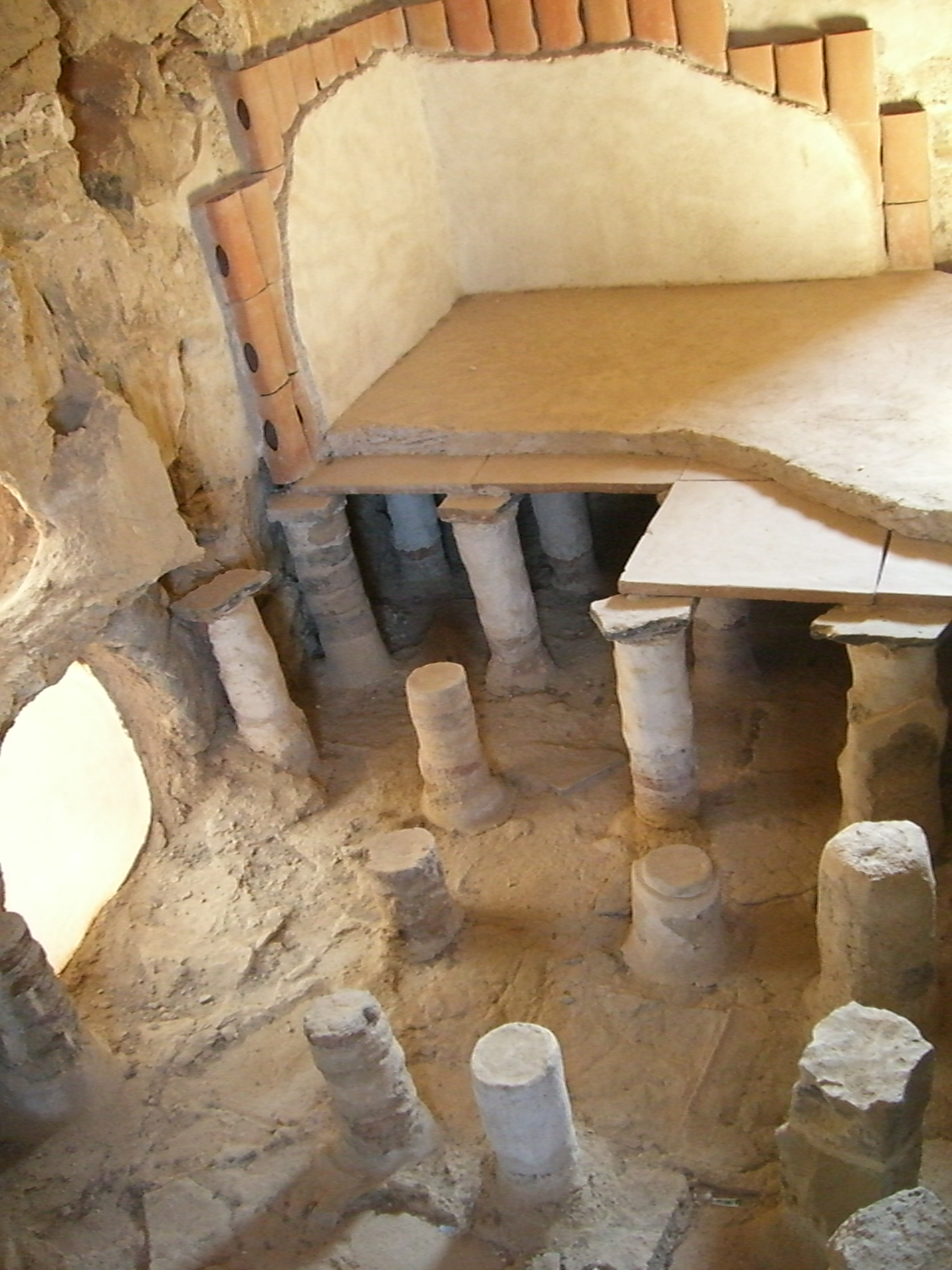
A caldarium (hot room) in northern Roman-style public bath (#35 on plan)

According to Josephus, between 37 and 31 BC, Herod the Great built a large fortress on the plateau as a refuge for himself in the event of a revolt and erected two palaces with an endless food supply.

=== First Jewish–Roman War ===
In 66 CE, a group of Jewish rebels, the Sicarii, overcame the Roman garrison of Masada with the aid of a ruse. According to Josephus, the Sicarii were an extremist Jewish splinter group antagonistic to a larger grouping of Jews referred to as the Zealots, who carried the main burden of the rebellion. Josephus said that the Sicarii raided nearby Jewish villages including Ein Gedi, where they massacred 700 women and children.

In 73 AD, the Roman governor of Judaea, Lucius Flavius Silva, headed the Roman legion X Fretensis and laid siege to Masada. Another source gives the year of the siege of Masada as 73 or 74 CE. The Roman legion surrounded Masada, building a circumvallation wall and then a siege ramp against the western face of the plateau. According to Dan Gill, geological investigations in the early 1990s confirmed earlier observations that the 114 m (375 ft) high assault ramp consisted mostly of a natural spur of bedrock.

The ramp was complete in the spring of 73, after probably two to three months of siege, allowing the Romans to breach the wall of the fortress with a battering ram on April 16. The Romans employed the X Legion and a number of auxiliary units and Jewish prisoners of war, totaling some 15,000, of whom an estimated 8,000 to 9,000 were fighting men, in crushing Jewish resistance at Masada.

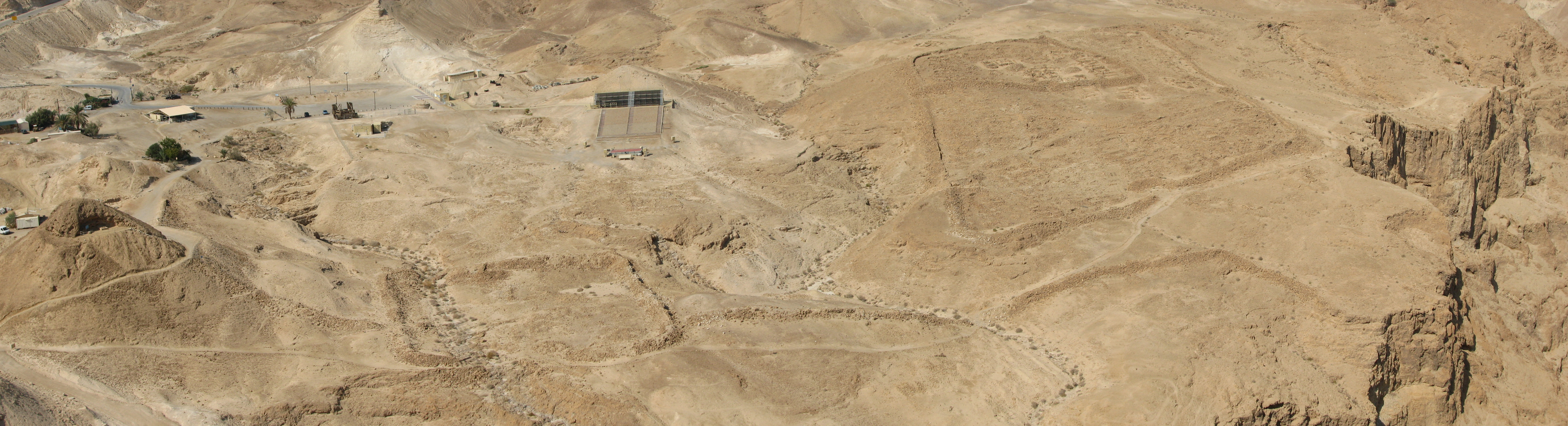
Western view from Masada of Roman military encampments and wall.

A giant siege tower with a battering ram was constructed and moved laboriously up the completed ramp. According to Josephus, when Roman troops entered the fortress, they discovered that its defenders had set all the buildings but the food storerooms ablaze and committed mass suicide or killed each other, 960 men, women, and children in total. Josephus wrote of two stirring speeches that the Sicari leader had made to convince his men to kill themselves. Only two women and five children were found alive.

Josephus presumably based his narration upon the field commentaries of the Roman commanders that were accessible to him.

There are discrepancies between archaeological findings and Josephus' writings. Josephus mentions only one of the two palaces that have been excavated, refers only to one fire, though many buildings show fire damage, and claims that 960 people were killed, though the remains of at most 28 bodies have been found. Some of the other details that Josephus gives were correct – for instance, he describes the baths that were built there, the fact that the floors in some of the buildings 'were paved with stones of several colours', and that many pits were cut into the living rock to serve as cisterns. Yadin found some partially intact mosaic floors which meet that description.

=== Byzantine monastery of Marda ===
Masada was last occupied during the Byzantine period, when a small church was established at the site. The church was part of a monastic settlement identified with the monastery of Marda known from hagiographical literature. This identification is generally accepted by researchers. The Aramaic common noun marda, "fortress", corresponds in meaning to the Greek name of another desert monastery of the time, Kastellion, and is used to describe that site in the vita (biography) of St Sabbas, but it is used as a proper name only for the monastery at Masada, as can be seen from the vita of St Euthymius.

== Archaeology ==
=== Chalcolithic period ===
An almost inaccessible cave, dubbed Yoram Cave, located on the sheer southern cliff face 100 m below the plateau, has been found to contain numerous plant remains, of which 6,000-year-old barley seeds were in such good state of preservation that their genome could be sequenced. This is the first time that this succeeded with a Chalcolithic plant genome, which is also the oldest one sequenced so far. The result helped determine that the earliest domestication of barley, dated elsewhere in the Fertile Crescent to 10,000 years ago, happened further north up the Jordan Rift Valley, namely in the Upper Jordan Valley in northern Israel.

The Yoram Cave seeds were found to be fairly different from the wild variety, proof for an already advanced process of domestication, but very similar to the types of barley still cultivated in the region—an indication for remarkable constancy. Considering the difficulty in reaching the cave, whose mouth opens some 4 m above the exposed access path, the researchers have speculated that it was a place of short-term refuge for Chalcolithic people fleeing an unknown catastrophe.

=== Identification and initial digs ===
The site of Masada was identified in 1838 by Americans Edward Robinson and Eli Smith, and in 1842, American missionary Samuel W. Wolcott and the English painter W. Tipping were the first moderns to climb it. After visiting the site several times in the 1930s and 1940s, Shmarya Guttman conducted an initial probe excavation of the site in 1959.

=== Yigael Yadin expedition ===
Masada was extensively excavated between 1963 and 1965 by an expedition led by Israeli archaeologist and former military Chief-of-Staff Yigael Yadin.

Due to the remoteness from human habitation and its arid environment, the site remained largely untouched for two millennia.

Many of the ancient buildings have been restored from their remains, as have the wall paintings of Herod's two main palaces, and the Roman-style bathhouses that he built. The synagogue, storehouses, and houses of the Jewish rebels have also been identified and restored.

Water cisterns two-thirds of the way up the cliff drain the nearby wadis by an elaborate system of channels, which explains how the rebels managed to conserve enough water for such a long time.

The Roman attack ramp still stands on the western side and can be climbed on foot. The meter-high circumvallation wall that the Romans built around Masada can be seen, together with eight Roman siege camps just outside this wall. The Roman siege installations as a whole, especially the attack ramp, are the best preserved of their kind, and the reason for declaring Masada a UNESCO World Heritage site.

Yadin published a book in 1966 for the general public, "מצדה" ("Masada").

==== Epigraphic findings ====
Inside the synagogue, an ostracon bearing the inscription ma'aser cohen (מעשר כוהן, tithe for the priest) was found, as were fragments of two scrolls: parts of Deuteronomy and of the Book of Ezekiel, found hidden in pits dug under the floor of a small room built inside the synagogue. In other loci, fragments were found of the books of Genesis, Leviticus, Psalms, and Sirach, as well as of the Songs of the Sabbath Sacrifice.

In the area in front of the Northern Palace, 11 small ostraca were recovered, each bearing a single name. One reads "ben Ya'ir" (בן יאיר) and could be short for Eleazar ben Ya'ir, the commander of the fortress. The other 10 names may be those of the men chosen by lot to kill the others and then themselves, as recounted by Josephus.

==== Human remains ====
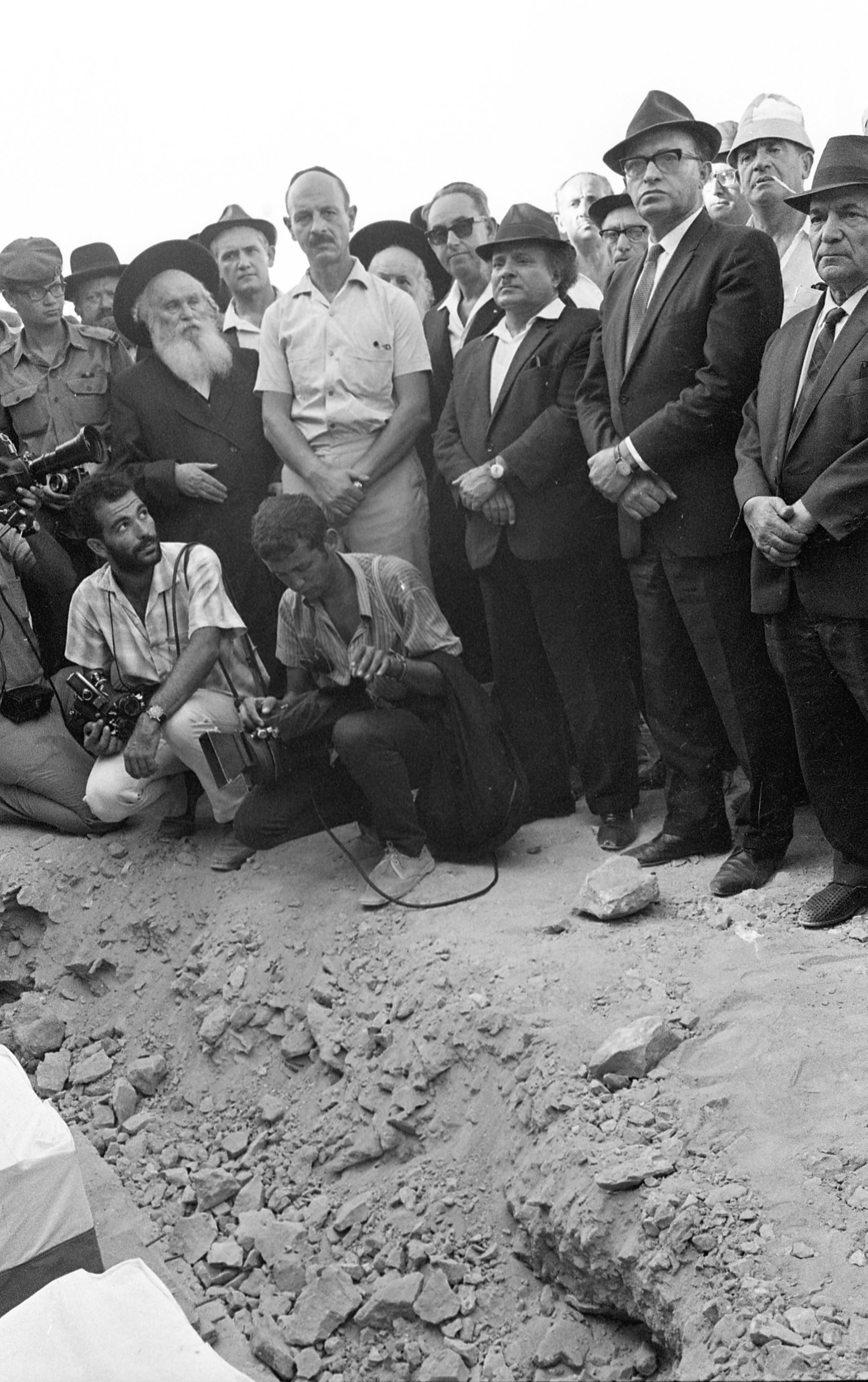
Funeral to the human remains unearthed at Masada, 1969. Menachem Begin and Yisrael Yeshayahu second and third in front from right.

The remains of a maximum of 28 people were unearthed at Masada, possibly 29 including a foetus. The skeletal remains of 25 individuals were found in a cave outside and below the southern wall. The remains of another two males and a female were found in the bathhouse of the Northern Palace.

Of the bathhouse remains, the males were variously estimated to have been of an age of either 40 and 20–22, or 22 and 11–12, or based on dental remains, between 16–18 of age. One estimate for the female's age was 17–18 years. The skeletal remains of the males were incomplete. Only the hair, a full head of hair with braids, but no bones of the female were found.

Forensic analysis showed the hair had been shaved from the woman's head with a sharp instrument while she was still alive, a practice prescribed for captured women in the Bible (Deuteronomy 21:10–12) and the 2nd-century BC Temple Scroll. The braids indicate that she was married. Based on the evidence, anthropologist Joe Zias and forensic scientist Azriel Gorski believe the remains may have been Romans whom the rebels captured when they seized the garrison.

As to the sparse remains of 24 people found in the southern cave at the base of the cliff, excavator Yigael Yadin was unsure of their ethnicity. The rabbinical establishment concluded that they were remains of the Jewish defenders, and in July 1969, they were reburied as Jews in a state ceremony. Carbon dating of textiles found with the remains in the cave indicate they are contemporaneous with the period of the revolt, and pig bones were present, occasionally occurring for Roman burials due to pig sacrifices. This indicates that the remains may belong to non-Jewish Roman soldiers or civilians who occupied the site before or after the siege. Zias questioned whether as many as 24 individuals were present, since only 4% of that number of bones was recovered.

==== Roman-period palm seed ====
A 2,000-year-old Judean date palm seed discovered during archaeological excavations in the early 1960s was successfully germinated into a date plant, popularly known as "Methuselah" after the longest-living figure in the Hebrew Bible. At the time, it was the oldest known germination, remaining so until a new record was set in 2012. As of February 2024, it remains the oldest germination from a seed.

==== Byzantine monastery ====
The remnants of a Byzantine church dating from the fifth and sixth centuries have been excavated on the plateau.

=== Archaeology vs. Josephus ===
==== No Hasmonean buildings found ====
Yadin's team could detect no architectural remains of the Hasmonean period, the only findings firmly dated to this period being the numerous coins of Alexander Jannaeus. Researchers have speculated that the southwestern block of the Western Palace and the auxiliary buildings east and south of it could be Hasmonean, relying on similarities to the Twin Palaces at Jericho. However, their excavators could make no archaeological discovery able to support this presumption.

==== Inaccurate description ====
According to Shaye Cohen, archaeology shows that Josephus' account is "incomplete and inaccurate". Josephus writes of only one palace; archaeology reveals two. His description of the northern palace contains several inaccuracies, and he gives exaggerated figures for the height of the walls and towers. Josephus' account is contradicted by the "skeletons in the cave, and the numerous separate fires".

==== Historicity of mass suicide ====
According to Josephus, the siege of Masada by Roman troops from 73 to 74 CE, at the end of the First Jewish–Roman War, ended in the mass suicide of the 960 Sicarii rebels who were hiding there. However, the archaeological evidence relevant to this event is ambiguous and rejected entirely by some scholars. Eric Cline also believes that Josephus is retelling a similar event that happened to him during the Siege of Yodfat. There he and another soldier, the last survivors, decided to surrender rather than have one kill the other.

=== Phases and layout ===
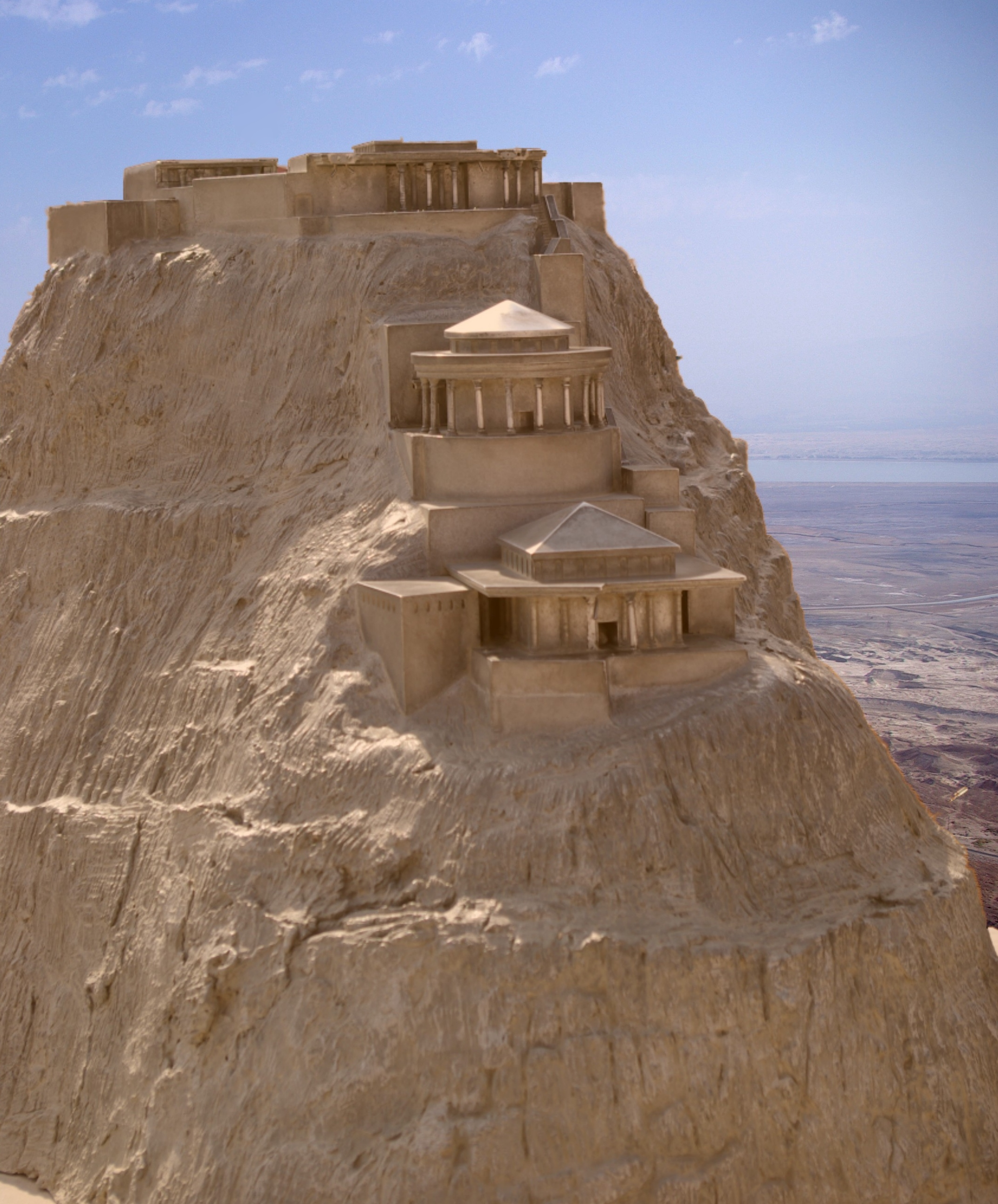
Model of the northern palace

An example of Herodian architecture, Masada was the first site Herod the Great fortified after he gained control of his kingdom.

==== Phase I: Western Palace etc. ====
The first of three building phases completed by Herod began in 35 BC. During the first phase the Western Palace was built, along with three smaller palaces, a storeroom, and army barracks. Three columbarium towers and a swimming pool at the south end of the site were also completed during this building phase.

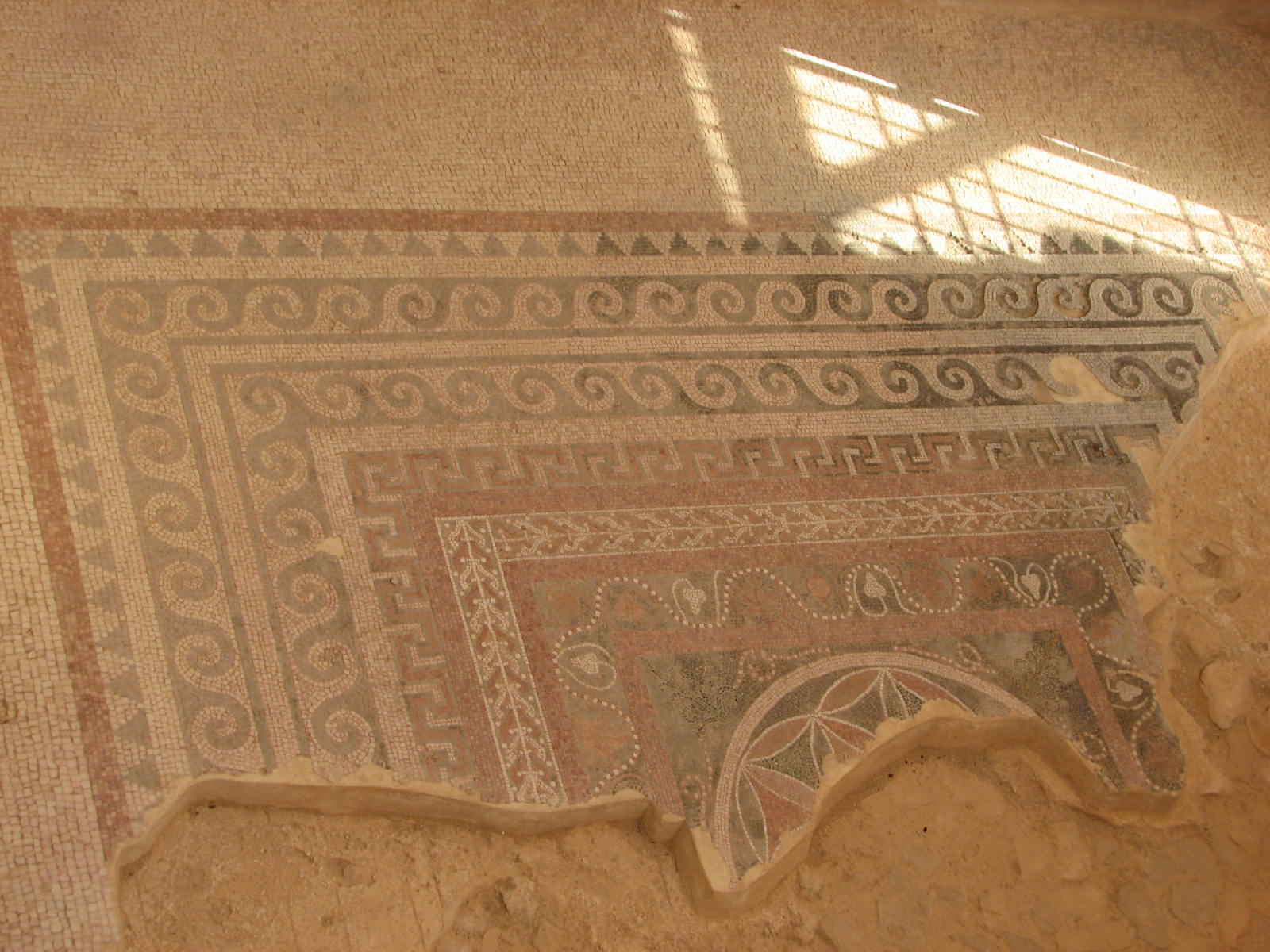
Mosaic floor in bathroom, the Western Palace at Masada.

The original center of the Western Palace was square and was accessed through an open courtyard on the northwest corner of the building. The courtyard was the central room of the Western Palace and directed visitors into a portico, used as a reception area for visitors. Visitors were then led to a throne room. Off the throne room was a corridor used by the king, with a private dressing room, which also had another entrance way that connected to the courtyard through the mosaic room. The mosaic room contained steps that led to a second floor with separate bedrooms for the king and queen.

==== Phase II: Northern Palace etc. ====
The second building phase in 25 BC included an addition to the Western Palace, a large storage complex for food, and the Northern Palace. The Northern Palace is one of Herod's more lavish palace-fortresses, and was built on the hilltop on the north side of Masada and continues two levels down, over the end of the cliffs. The upper terrace of the Northern Palace included living quarters for the king and a semicircular portico to provide a view of the area. A stairway on the west side led down to the middle terrace that was a decorative circular reception hall. The lower terrace was also for receptions and banquets. It was enclosed on all four sides with porticos and included a Roman bathhouse.

==== Phase III: casemate wall etc. ====
In 15 BC, during the third and final building phase, the entire site of Masada—except for the Northern Palace—was enclosed by a casemate wall, which consisted of a double wall with a space between that was divided into rooms by perpendicular walls; these were used as living chambers for the soldiers and as extra storage space. The Western Palace was also extended for a third time to include more rooms for the servants and their duties.

Site Plan
1. Snake Path gate 2. Rebel dwellings 3. Byzantine monastic cave 4. eastern water cistern 5. rebel dwellings 6. mikvah 7. southern gate 8. rebel dwellings 9. southern water cistern 10. southern fort 11. swimming pool 12. small palace 13. round columbarium tower 14. mosaic workshop 15. small palace 16. small palace 17. stepped pool 18. Western Palace: service area 19. Western Palace: residential area 20. Western Palace: storerooms 21. Western Palace: administrative area 22. tanners' tower 23. western Byzantine gate 24. columbarium towers 25. synagogue 26. Byzantine church 27. barracks 28. Northern complex: grand residence 29. Northern complex: quarry 30. Northern complex: commandant's headquarters 31. Northern complex: tower 32. Northern complex: administration building 33. Northern complex: gate 34. Northern complex: storerooms 35. Northern complex: bathhouse 36. Northern complex: water gate 37. Northern Palace: upper terrace 38. Northern Palace: middle terrace 39. Northern Palace: lower terrace; A. ostraca cache found in casemate B. Herod's throne room C. colorful mosaic D. Roman breaching point E. coin cache found F. ostraca cache found G. three skeletons found

== Modern tourism ==
Masada was declared a UNESCO World Heritage Site in 2001. In 2007, the Masada Museum in Memory of Yigael Yadin opened at the site, in which archeological findings are displayed in a theatrical setting. Many of the artifacts exhibited were unearthed by Yadin and his archaeological team from the Hebrew University of Jerusalem during the 1960s.

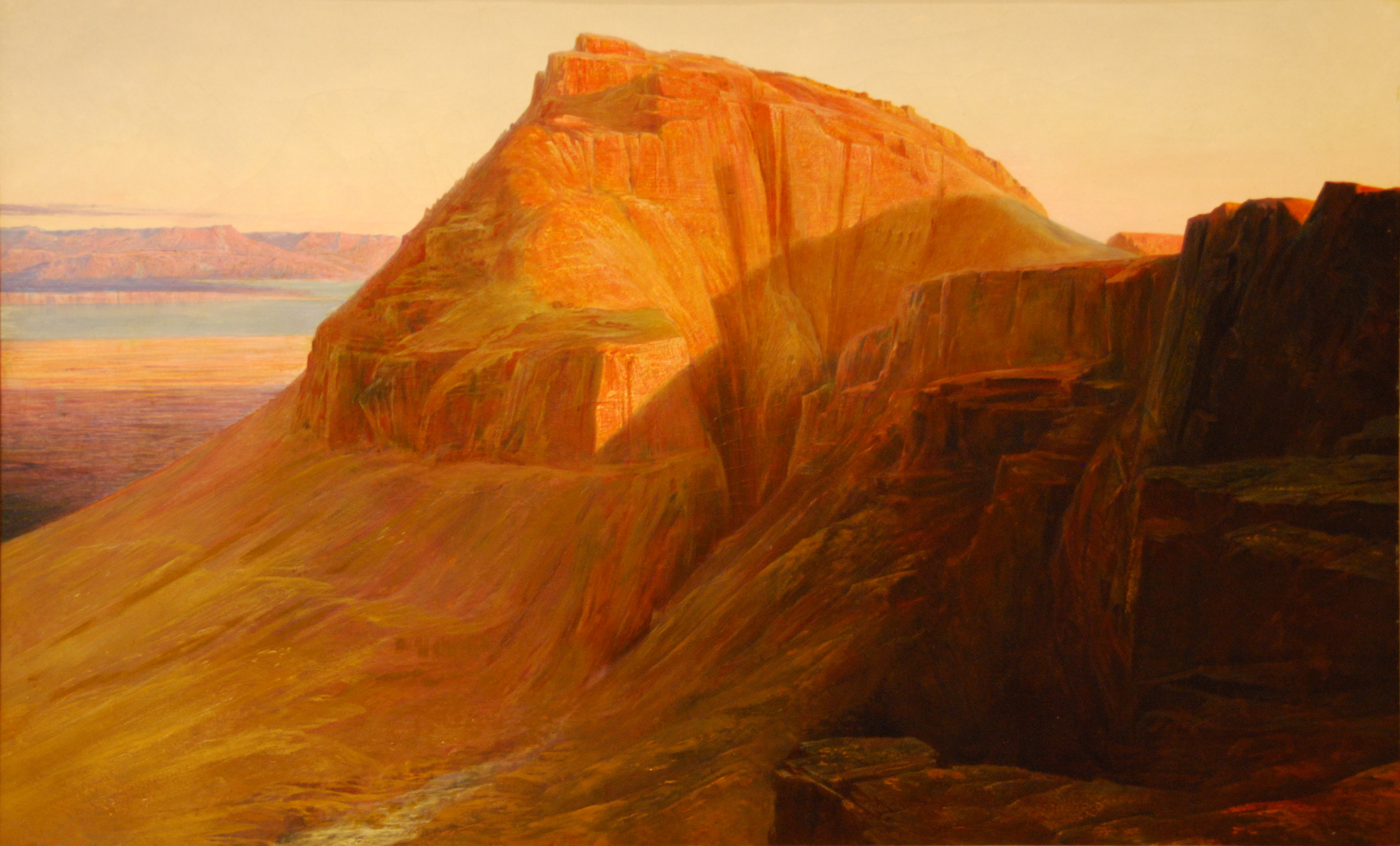
Masada as painted by Edward Lear, 1858.

The archaeological site is situated in the Masada National Park, and the park requires an entrance fee (even if by hiking). There are two hiking paths, both very steep:

- The Snake Trail leaves from the eastern side at the Masada Museum (access via the Dead Sea Highway) and gains around 301 m (988 ft) in elevation.
- The Roman Ramp trail is also very steep, but has less elevation gain, and is accessed from the western side of the mountain (with access by car from the Arad road).

Hikers frequently start an hour before sunrise, when the park opens, to avoid the mid-day heat, which can exceed 43 °C (109 °F) in the summer. In fact, the hiking paths are often closed during the day in the summer because of the heat. Visitors are encouraged to bring drinking water for the hike up, as water is available only at the top.

Alternatively, for a higher fee, visitors can take a cable car (the Masada cableway, opens at 8 am) to the top of the mesa.

A visitors' center and the museum are at the base of the cable car.

A light-and-sound show is presented on some summer nights on the western side of the mountain (access by car from the Arad road or by foot, down the mountain via the Roman Ramp path).

== Legacy and symbolism ==
In the twentieth century, the narrative of the siege at Masada was transformed from a relatively obscure historical event into a central ideological symbol of Israeli national identity. This legacy has profoundly shaped the modern Zionist narrative and inspired numerous adaptations across global popular culture and media.

=== Masada myth ===
The siege of Masada is often revered in modern Israel as "a symbol of Jewish heroism". Central to the Masada myth is a selectively constructed narrative based on the primary historical accounts of Josephus, wherein the Sicarii are a splinter group of the Zealots. According to Klara Palotai, "Masada became a symbol for a heroic 'last stand' for the State of Israel and played a major role for Israel in forging national identity."

To Israel, the story symbolized the courage of the warriors of Masada, the strength they showed when they were able to keep hold of Masada for almost three years, and their choice of death over slavery in their struggle against an aggressive empire. Masada had become "the performance space of national heritage", the site of military ceremonies. Palotai states how Masada "developed a special 'love affair' with archeology" because the site had drawn people from all around the world to help locate the remnants of the fortress and the battle that occurred there.

=== World War II ===
The Masada story was the inspiration for the "Masada plan" devised by the British during the Mandate era. The plan was to man defensive positions on Mount Carmel with Palmach fighters, to stop Erwin Rommel's expected drive through the region in 1942. The plan was abandoned following Rommel's defeat at El Alamein.

=== Israeli army ===
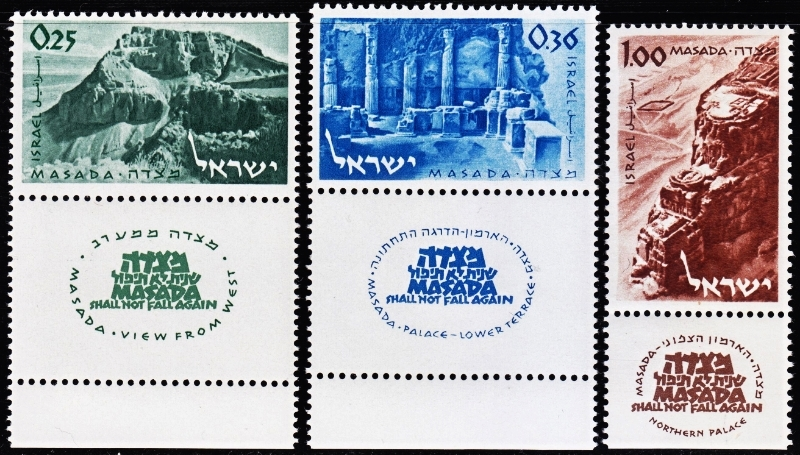
Set of three Masada commemorative stamps, issued by Israel in 1965

The chief of staff of the Israel Defense Forces (IDF), Moshe Dayan, initiated the practice of holding the swearing-in ceremony of Israeli Armoured Corps soldiers who had completed their tironut (IDF basic training) on top of Masada. The ceremony ended with the declaration: "Masada shall not fall again." The soldiers climbed the Snake Path at night and were sworn in with torches lighting the background. These ceremonies are now also held at various other memorable locations, including the Armoured Corps Memorial at Latrun, the Western Wall and Ammunition Hill in Jerusalem, Akko Prison, and training bases.

=== In popular culture ===
- A miniseries about the citadel was broadcast in 1981.
- Jewish American light welterweight champion boxer Cletus Seldin wears a jacket, on the back of which is written "Remember the Masada".
- Masada was a featured location during the ninth and tenth episodes of The Amazing Race Australia 1 (2011).
- In 2017, Jean Michel Jarre performed an electronic music concert near the fortress.
- Masada is the main plot location in the fourth season of Preacher.
- 'XK Masada' is the codename of a continuity-of-command refuge off-planet in "A Colder War".
- Masada is the main plot location for the novel The Dovekeepers as well as the two-part television drama of the same name.
- Masada is the title of a song and album dedicated to the site by Ivorian reggae singer Alpha Blondy.

== Gallery ==
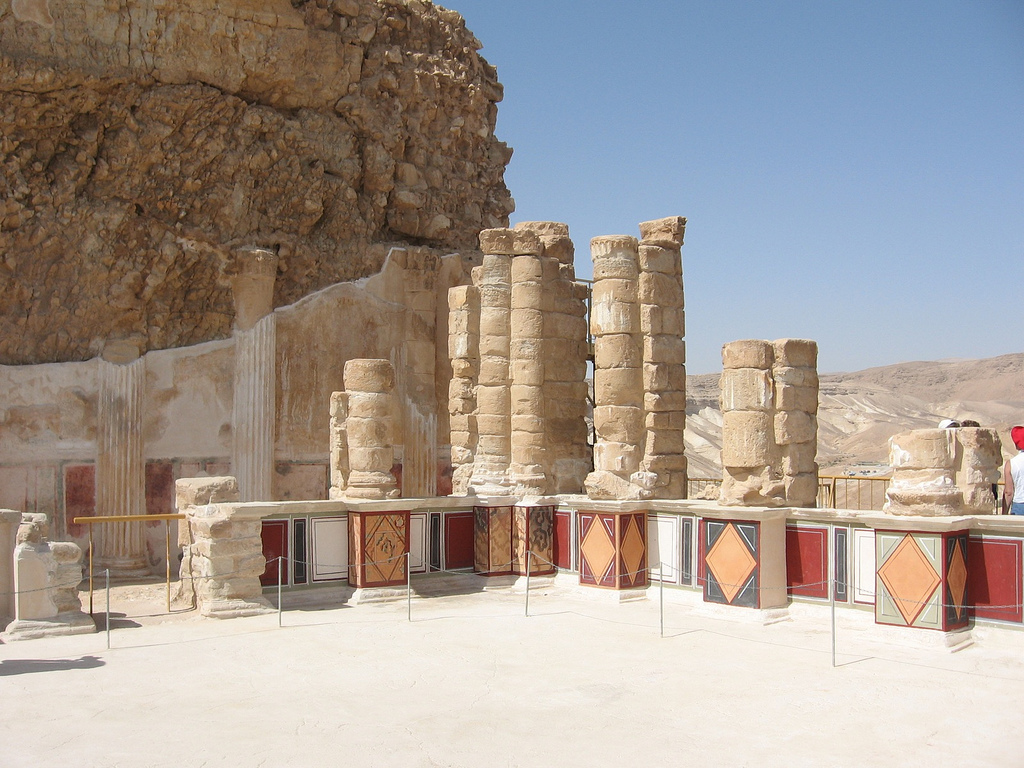
The Northern Palace's lower terrace (#39 on plan)

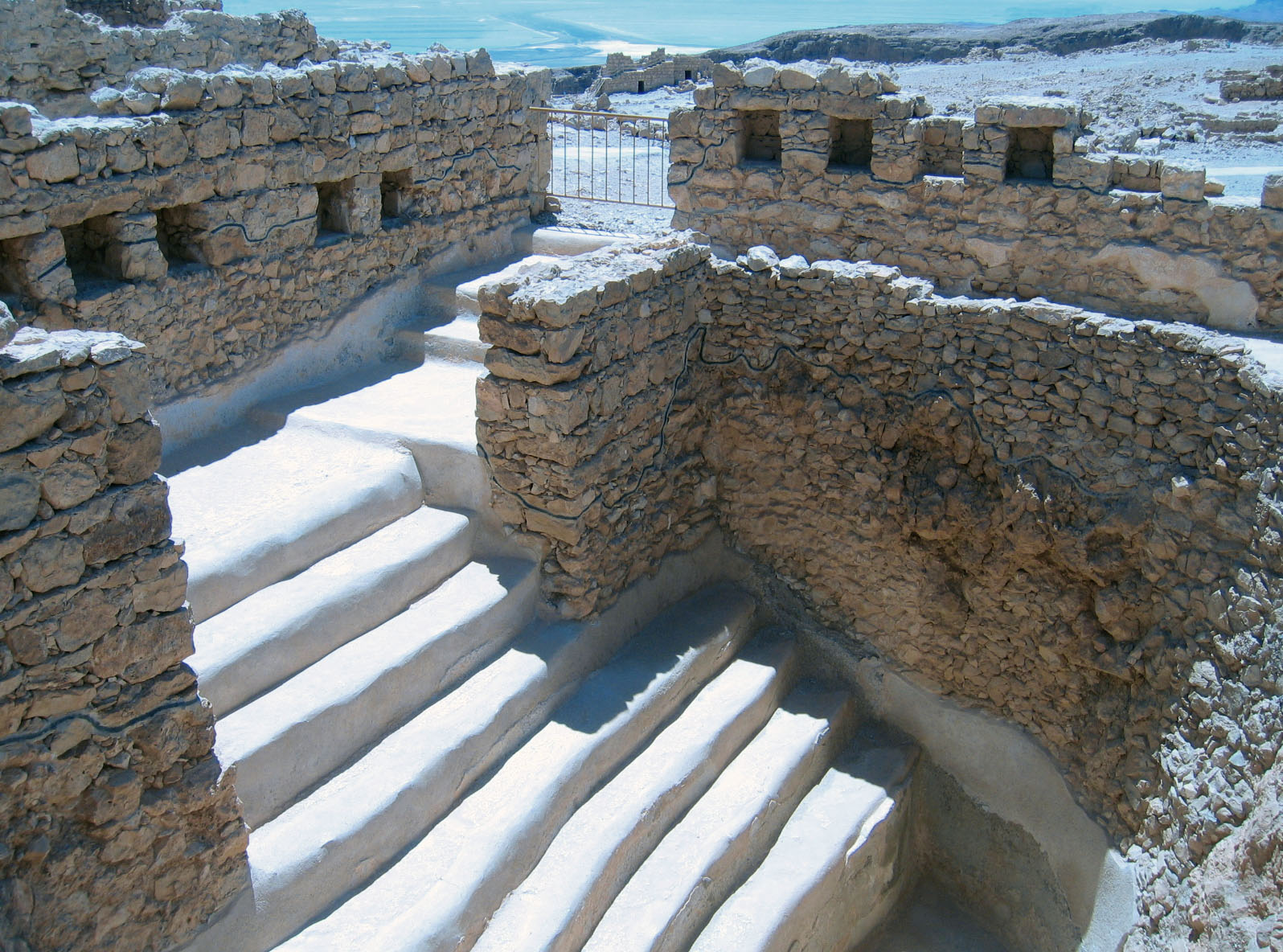
Stepped pool interpreted by Yadin as a Herodian swimming pool, possibly used as a public ritual immersion bath (mikveh) by the rebels (#17 on plan)

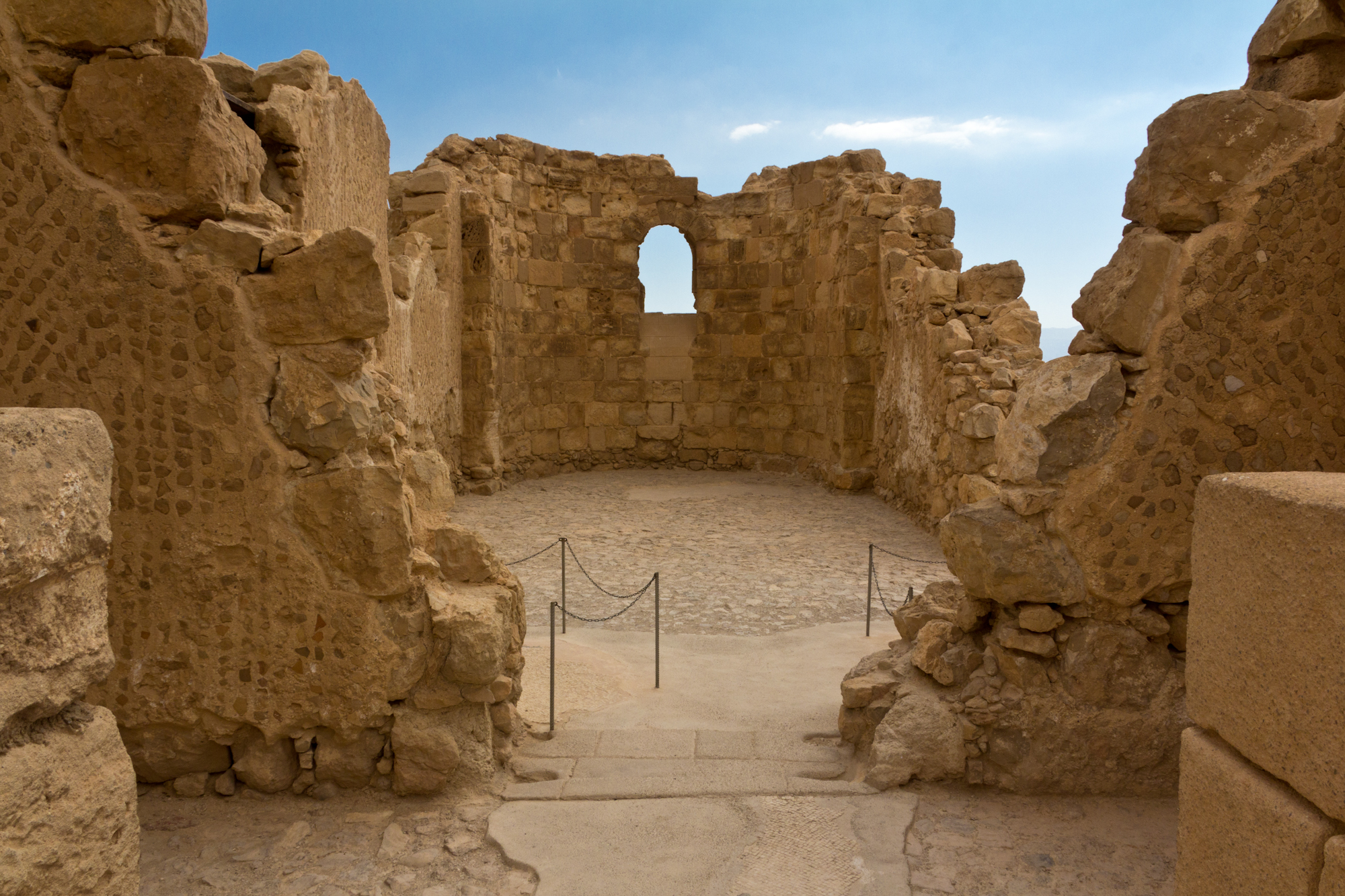
Byzantine church (#26 on plan)

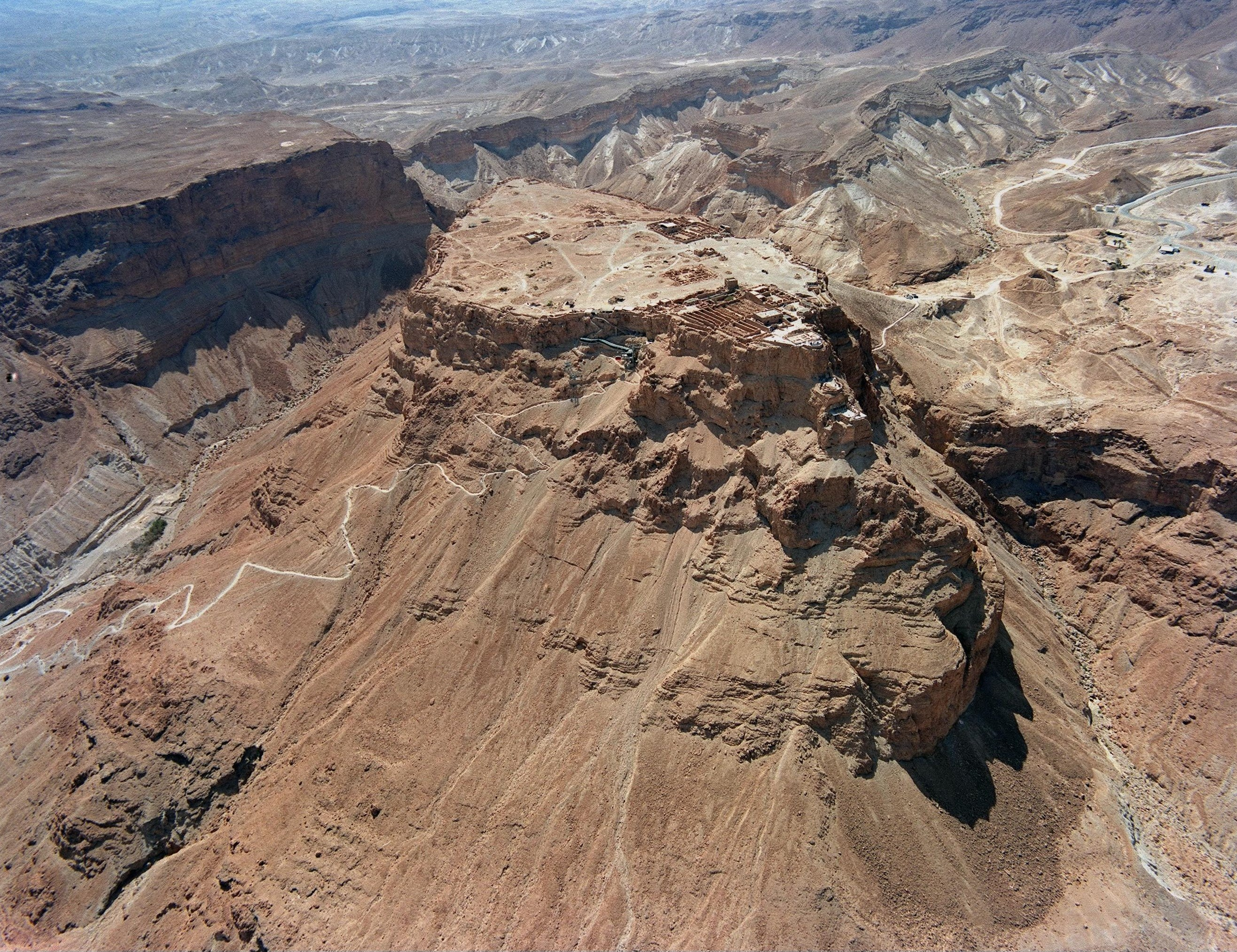
Aerial view showing Masada and the Snake Path from the northeast

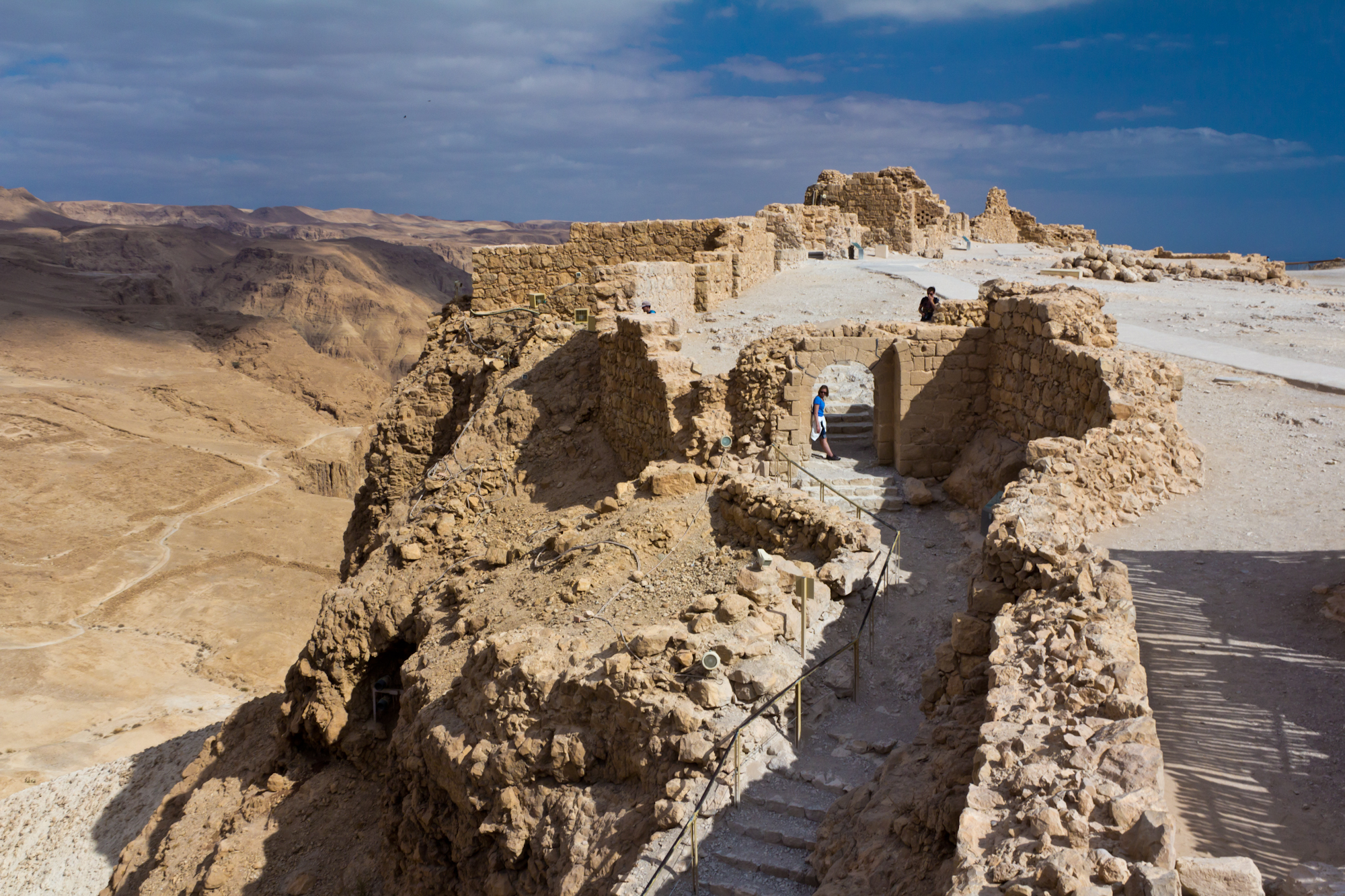
Masada's western Byzantine gate (#23 on plan)

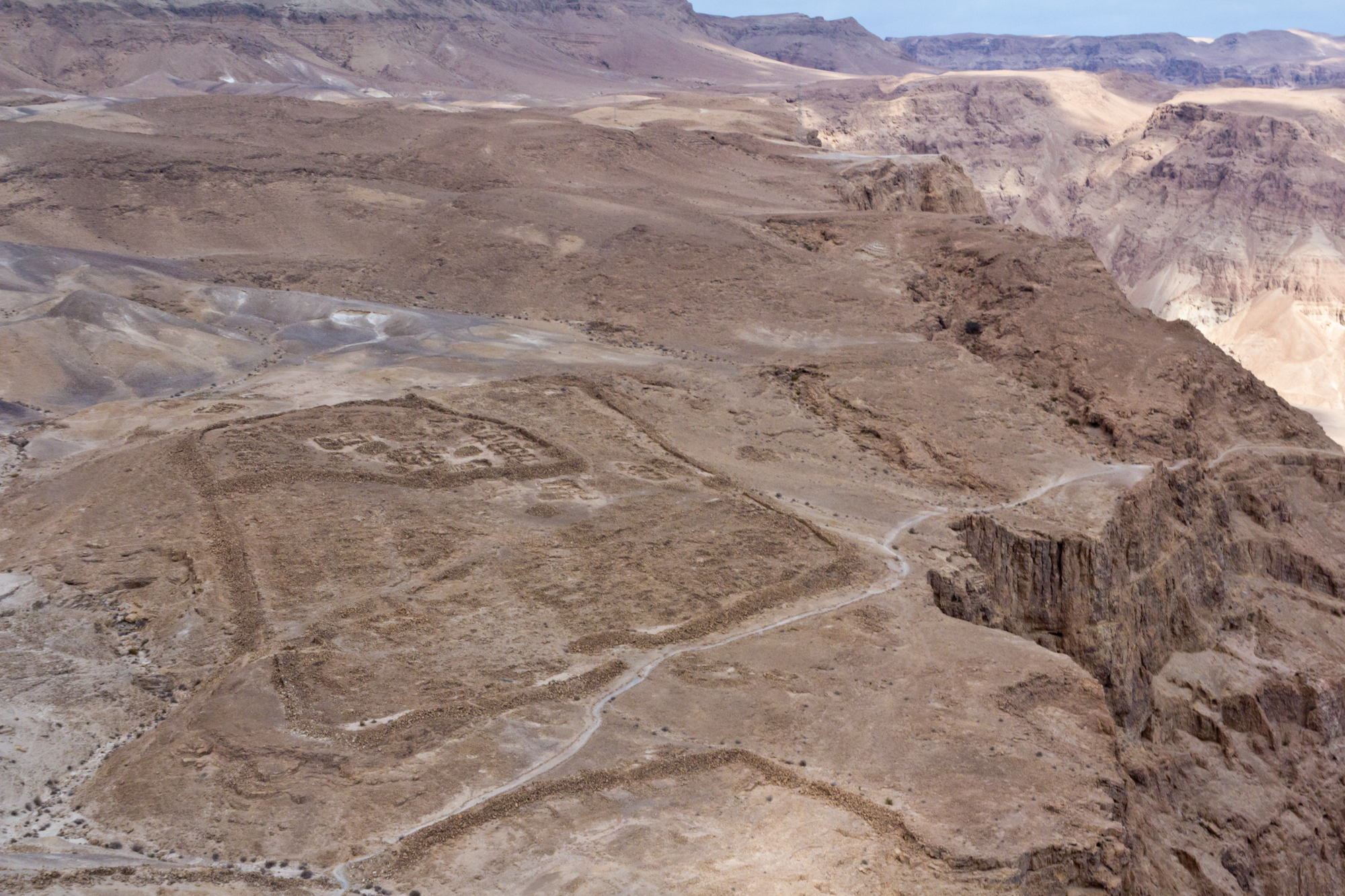
Roman siege camp F and section of the Roman circumvallation wall

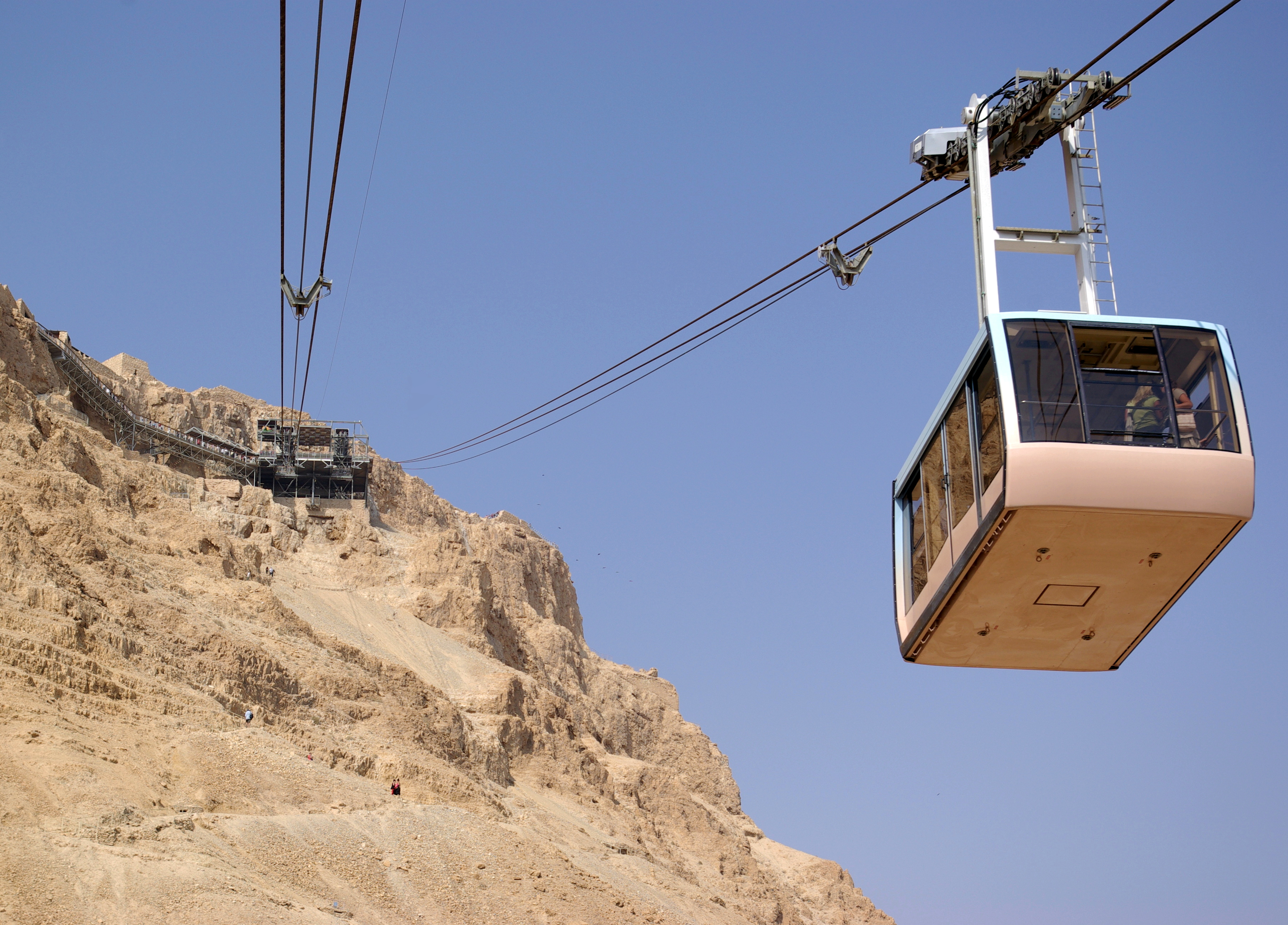
Cable car (Masada cableway) heading down from Masada

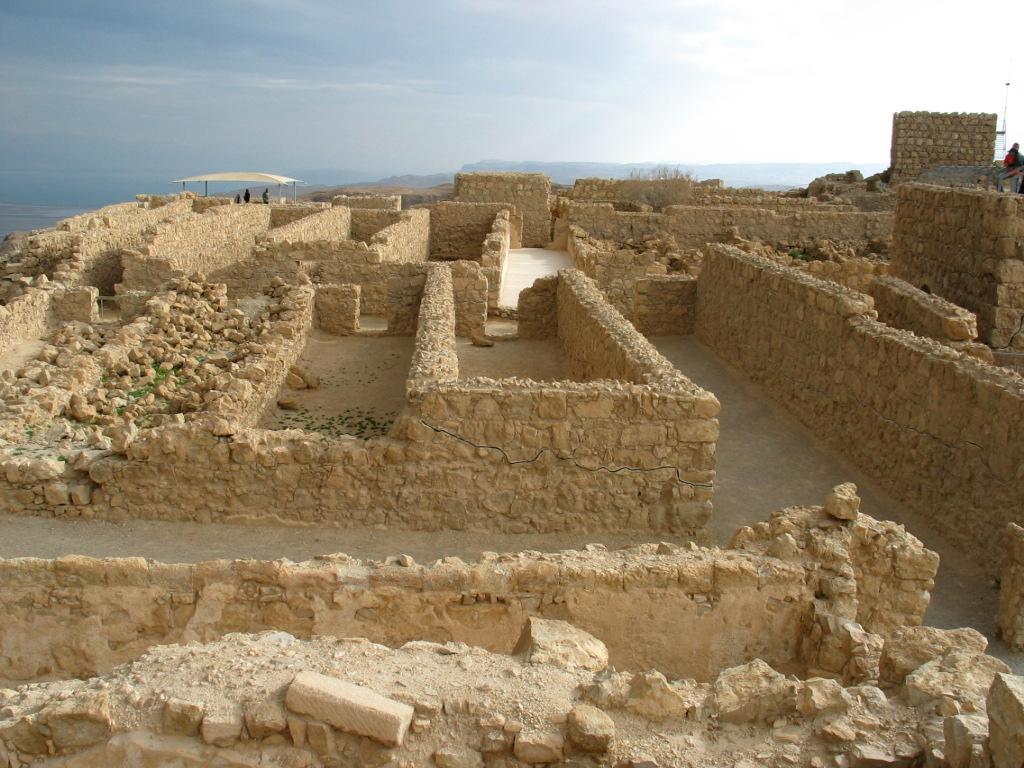
Masada structures

== See also ==
- Archaeology of Israel
- Gamla, an ancient site dubbed the "Masada of the North"
- Masada myth
- Tourism in Israel
