= João Aguiar (writer) =

Portuguese writer and journalist

- Born: João Casimiro Namorado de Aguiar; 28 October 1943; Lisbon, Portugal
- Died: 3 June 2010 (aged 66); Lisbon, Portugal
- Education: Free University of Brussels
- Occupations: Writer and journalist

João Casimiro Namorado de Aguiar (28 October 1943 – 3 June 2010) was a Portuguese writer and journalist. He spent his youth in Portuguese Mozambique. Aguiar was born and died in Lisbon. After working for a time in the Portuguese tourist industry in Brussels and Amsterdam, he studied journalism at the Free University of Brussels and in 1976 returned to Portugal to work as a journalist.

He worked for RTP (where he began his career in 1963) and a variety of daily and weekly periodicals such as the Daily News, A Luta, Diário Popular, O País, and Sábado. In 1981 he was named press secretary of the Ministry of Quality of Life, a short-lived government department concerned with sports and the environment. He was a regular contributor to the monthly magazine Superinteressante and sat on its editorial board. He died of cancer on 3 June 2010 in Lisbon.

He dedicated himself to literature, being one of the most acclaimed Portuguese novelists in the genre of the historical novel.

== Major works ==
- An Investigation of Portuguese Esotericism (Uma incursão no esoterismo português) (1983)
- The Voice of the Gods (A Voz dos Deuses) (1984)
- The Man With No Name (O homem sem nome) (1986)
- The Throne of the Most High (O trono do altíssimo) (1988)
- The Song of the Phantasms (O canto dos fantasmas) (1990)
- The Pearl-Eaters (Os comedores de pérolas) (1992)
- The Hour of Sertorius (A hora de Sertório) (1994)
- The Eulogy of the Spirits (A encomendação das almas) (1995)
- Solitary Navigator (Navegador solitário) (1996)
- Inês of Portugal (Inês de Portugal) (1997)
- The Dragon of Smoke (O dragão de fumo) (1998)
- The Green Cathedral (A catedral verde) (2000)
- A Goddess in the Fog (Uma Deusa na Bruma) (2003)
- The Seventh Hero (O sétimo herói) (2004)
- The Garden of Delights (O jardim das delícias) (2005)
- The Sitting Tiger (O tigre sentado) (2005, 2nd edition)
- Lapedo – A Child in the Valley (Lapedo – uma criança no vale) (2006)
- The Priory of the Cifrão (O priorado do cifrão) (2008)

=== Children's fiction ===
- The Group of Four (O Bando dos Quatro)
- Sebastian and the Secret Worlds (Sebastião e os Mundos Secretos)

=== Other works ===
- The White Orchid (A Orquídea Branca), libretto for an opera with music by Jorge Salgueiro (premiered 27 October 2008)
- I Saw the Third Reich Fall (Eu vi morrer o III Reich) by Manuel Homem de Mello (edited and with commentary by João Aguiar) (Ediciones Vega, Lisboa)
