= Masada (miniseries) =

1981 American television historical drama miniseries

- DVD cover
- Genre: Historical drama
- Based on: The Antagonists by Ernest Gann
- Written by: Joel Oliansky
- Directed by: Boris Sagal
- Starring: Peter O'Toole; Peter Strauss; Barbara Carrera; Anthony Quayle; Paul L. Smith; David Warner
- Narrated by: Richard Basehart
- Composers: Jerry Goldsmith (episodes 1 and 2, 1981); Morton Stevens (episodes 3 and 4, 1981)
- Country of origin: United States
- Original language: English
- No. of episodes: 4

Production
- Executive producers: George Eckstein; Jennings Lang
- Producer: Richard Irving
- Production locations: Masada, Israel
- Cinematography: Paul Lohmann
- Editors: Edwin F. England; Robert L. Kimble; Peter Kirby
- Running time: 394 minutes
- Production companies: Arnon Milchan Film Production, Ltd.; Universal Television

Original release
- Network: ABC
- Release: April 5 – April 8, 1981

Masada is an American historical drama television miniseries that aired on ABC in April 1981. Advertised by the network as an "ABC Novel for Television," the TV series' script is based on the 1971 novel The Antagonists by Ernest Gann, with a screenplay written by Joel Oliansky. It tells a fictionalized account of the historical siege of the Masada citadel in Roman Palestine by legions of the Roman Empire in AD 73. The siege ended when the Roman armies entered the fortress, only to discover the mass suicide by the Jewish defenders when defeat became imminent.

The miniseries starred: Peter O'Toole as Roman legion commander Lucius Flavius Silva, Peter Strauss as the Jewish commander Eleazar ben Ya'ir and Barbara Carrera as Silva's Jewish mistress. It was O'Toole's first appearance in an American miniseries.

Masada was one of several historical miniseries produced in the early 1980s, following the success of the miniseries Roots, that aired on the ABC Network in 1977, and Shogun, which aired on NBC in 1980.

== Plot ==
=== Part I ===
In the year 70 AD, with the fall of Jerusalem and the destruction of the Second Temple, the Jewish rebellion against Roman occupation is declared over, but Eleazar ben Ya'ir and his family flee the city, vowing that the Judean War is not ended. Eleazar and his followers make their headquarters on top of the mountain fortress of Masada. From there they conduct raids on Roman occupied villages in the south of Roman Judea. These guerrilla attacks threaten the credibility of the declared Roman victory.

The commanding general of the 10th Legion, Cornelius Flavius Silva, arranges a meeting with Eleazar to negotiate a truce. Returning to Rome, Silva's hopes to implement a truce in Judea are quashed by the Emperor Vespasian, because of political pressures in the Roman Senate. Silva is sent back to Judea, after securing the services of veteran siege commander Rubrius Gallus. Silva is informed that his second-in-command, general Marcus Quadratus, and head tribune Merovius, are spies for the emperor's political enemy. While Silva is still in Rome, through the treachery of these two men, the truce is violently broken by the Romans.

=== Part II ===
Learning of the breaking of the truce upon his return from Rome, Silva marches the 5,000 men of the 10th Legion to the foot of Masada and lays a siege to the apparently impregnable fortress. He directs Quadratus and Merovius on a suicidal assault of the fortress, in order to remove them from his forces and make them an example to any others who share their political leanings. Rubrius Gallus directs that a ramp be built to almost the summit of the mountain, intent on breaking through the Masada walls with the aid of a 50-foot (15.24 m) siege tower that is being constructed out of sight of the rebels.

When Eleazar successfully attacks the Roman soldiers building the ramp with catapulted stones, Silva quickly rounds up hundreds of Jews from the surrounding area to use as slaves to continue the work, believing correctly that Eleazar will not attack fellow Jews. This makes Eleazar change his tactics to psychological warfare, allowing the heat of the sun and revealing the surplus of water on Masada to demoralize the Roman troops.

He acts to capitalize on the Romans' belief in reading the future from the entrails of sacrificed goats, leading a party through the Roman sentries at night to feed the goats maggots, knowing that their discovery during the rituals will be seen as a bad omen. Eleazar's problems are further compounded by his own religious doubts and opposition from the more pacifist groups on Masada.

=== Part III ===
The political opportunist Pomponius Falco arrives and under the authority of the Emperor Vespasian relieves Silva as legion commander. Intent on ending the siege quickly through the use of terror, Falco orders Jewish slaves to be killed one by one, by catapulting them into the side of the mountain, until Eleazar surrenders. Eleazar, a religious skeptic, runs to the Masada synagogue and calls to God to stop the killing.

Revolted by Falco's barbaric actions, Silva forcibly takes back his command, stops the catapulting, and orders Falco placed under arrest. The cessation of Falco's terror is seen by the Zealots as a response to Eleazar's praying and affirmation of his leadership to them. Rubrius Gallus is killed by a Masadan arrow as he carries out measurements on the siege ramp, only living long enough to confirm his plans to his second in command.

=== Part IV ===
As the ramp nears completion, Eleazar faces the fact that the final confrontation with the Romans is not far off. The Zealots break into Herod's Armory and begin to prepare for what they believe will be a straightforward storming of the fortress walls by the Romans. When the ramp is complete, the Romans wheel out the armoured siege tower and battering-ram. Eleazar then realizes that he had underestimated Silva's strategy. As the tower begins moving up the ramp, Eleazar has his people build "an inner wall that will absorb the blows of the ram and not shatter."

Made from wooden beams from Herod's Palace roof and packed with dirt, they finish it just as the tower reaches the top of the ramp. The Romans quickly break through the stone walls of the fortress, but the ram does nothing against the improvised inner wall. As the wall is made partly of wood, Silva orders his men to set fire to it. Deducing that it would take all night for the wall to burn through, Silva has his men stand down. The rest of the night is tense for both sides, as the fitful wind may as easily spread the blaze to the siege tower as burn down the inner wall. The next day, the Romans break into the fortress, only to discover that Eleazar and his people had all committed suicide during the night.

The closing line is said by a dispirited and despondent Silva, who mourns all that has been hoped and planned and lost by both sides whilst fighting for "a rock, in the middle of a wasteland, on the shore of a poisoned sea...".

== Cast ==
Starring

- Peter O'Toole as Lucius Flavius Silva
- Peter Strauss as Eleazar Ben Yair
- Barbara Carrera as Sheva
- Nigel Davenport as Mucianus (ep. 1)
- Alan Feinstein as Aaron
- Giulia Pagano as Miriam
- Anthony Quayle as Rubrius Gallus
- Denis Quilley as General Marcus Quadratus (eps. 1–2)
- Paul L. Smith as Gideon
- Anthony Valentine as Merovius, Head Tribune (eps. 1–2)
- Timothy West as Emperor Vespasian (ep. 1)
- David Warner as Pomponius Falco

Also starring

- Clive Francis as Attius
- George Peter Innes as Titus (ep. 1)
- David Opatoshu as Shimon
- Richard Pierson as Ephraim
- Jack Watson as Decurion (eps. 2–3)
- Joseph Wiseman as Jerahmeel, Head Essene (ep. 1)

Co-starring

- Christopher Biggins as Claudius Albinus
- Nick Brimble as Milades
- Warren Clarke as Plinius
- Vernon Dobtcheff as Roman Chief Priest
- Michael Elphick as Vettius
- Patrick Gorman as Tribune
- Ken Hutchison as Fronto
- Kevin McNally as Norbanus
- Norman Rossington as Maro
- Joe Sagal as Seth
- W. Morgan Sheppard as Roman Sergeant
- Ray Smith as Lentius, would be assassin
- Richard Basehart as Narrator (uncredited)

== Production ==
Masada was filmed on location at the site of the ancient fortress, in the Judean Desert, Israel. Remains of a ramp, created during the filming to simulate the ramp built by the Romans to take the fortress, can be seen at the site. ABC, concerned that the audience would be unfamiliar with the historical background of the story, commissioned a 30-minute documentary, Back to Masada. Starring Peter O'Toole, it recounts the history of the Jewish revolt against Rome. The network gave the documentary to its affiliates to run in the weeks before the premiere of the miniseries.

== Soundtrack ==
The music for Parts I and II were composed by Jerry Goldsmith. Because of myriad production delays, Goldsmith was forced to move on to other previously contracted scoring commitments. Parts III and IV were composed by Morton Stevens, based on the themes and motifs Goldsmith had written.

In 1981, MCA Records released on vinyl and cassette a re-recording of selections of Goldsmith's music performed by the UK's National Philharmonic Orchestra under the composer's baton. In 2011, Intrada Records issued a 2-CD set of the original recording of the complete score. In 2021, a more expansive 4-CD set was released, with alternates, unreleased material, and the original album version.

== Awards and nominations ==
Year	Award	Category	Nominee(s)	Result	Ref.
1981	Primetime Emmy Awards	Outstanding Limited Series	George Eckstein	Nominated	
1981	Primetime Emmy Awards	Outstanding Lead Actor in a Limited Series or a Special	Peter O'Toole	Nominated	
1981	Primetime Emmy Awards	Outstanding Lead Actor in a Limited Series or a Special	Peter Strauss	Nominated	
1981	Primetime Emmy Awards	Outstanding Supporting Actor in a Limited Series or a Special	Anthony Quayle	Nominated	
1981	Primetime Emmy Awards	Outstanding Supporting Actor in a Limited Series or a Special	David Warner	Won	
1981	Primetime Emmy Awards	Outstanding Directing in a Limited Series or a Special	Boris Sagal (for "Episode IV")	Nominated	
1981	Primetime Emmy Awards	Outstanding Writing in a Limited Series or a Special	Joel Oliansky (for "Episode IV")	Nominated	
1981	Primetime Emmy Awards	Outstanding Art Direction for a Limited Series or a Special	Jack Senter, George Renne, Kuli Sander, Joseph J. Stone, and Edward M. Parker (for "Episode IV")	Nominated	
1981	Primetime Emmy Awards	Outstanding Costume Design for a Series	Vittorio Nino Novarese (for "Episode IV")	Nominated	
1981	Primetime Emmy Awards	Outstanding Film Editing for a Limited Series or a Special	Peter Kirby, Edwin F. England, and John Bloom (for "Episode IV")	Nominated	
1981	Primetime Emmy Awards	Outstanding Achievement in Makeup	Del Acevedo and Albert Jeyte (for "Episode IV")	Nominated	
1981	Primetime Emmy Awards	Outstanding Achievement in Music Composition for a Limited Series or a Special (Dramatic Underscore)	Jerry Goldsmith (for "Episode II")	Won	
1981	Primetime Emmy Awards	Outstanding Achievement in Music Composition for a Limited Series or a Special (Dramatic Underscore)	Morton Stevens (for "Episode IV")	Nominated	
1982	American Cinema Editors Awards	Best Edited Episode from a Television Mini-Series	Peter Kirby and Edwin F. England (for "Episode IV")	Won	
1982	Golden Globe Awards	Best Miniseries or Motion Picture Made for Television		Nominated	
1982	Golden Globe Awards	Best Actor in a Miniseries or Motion Picture Made for Television	Peter O'Toole	Nominated	
1982	Golden Globe Awards	Best Actor in a Miniseries or Motion Picture Made for Television	Peter Strauss	Nominated	
2011	International Film Music Critics Association Awards	Best Archival Release of an Existing Score	Jerry Goldsmith, Morton Stevens, Bruce Botnick, Douglass Fake, Roger Feigelson, Joe Sikoryak, and Jon Burlingame	Nominated	

== Home media ==
As was the case with Shogun, an edited, feature film–length version of the miniseries was made for theatrical release in other countries under the title The Antagonists. This was the version that was initially available on home video. The complete Masada miniseries first made it to the video market on four VHS tapes in 2001.

A two-disc DVD release titled Masada—The Complete Epic Mini-Series was released in September 2007. A Region 2 UK, two-disc DVD was released in January 2009.

== See also ==
- List of historical drama films
- List of films set in ancient Rome
