= Athenaeum of Philadelphia =

Member-supported library and museum

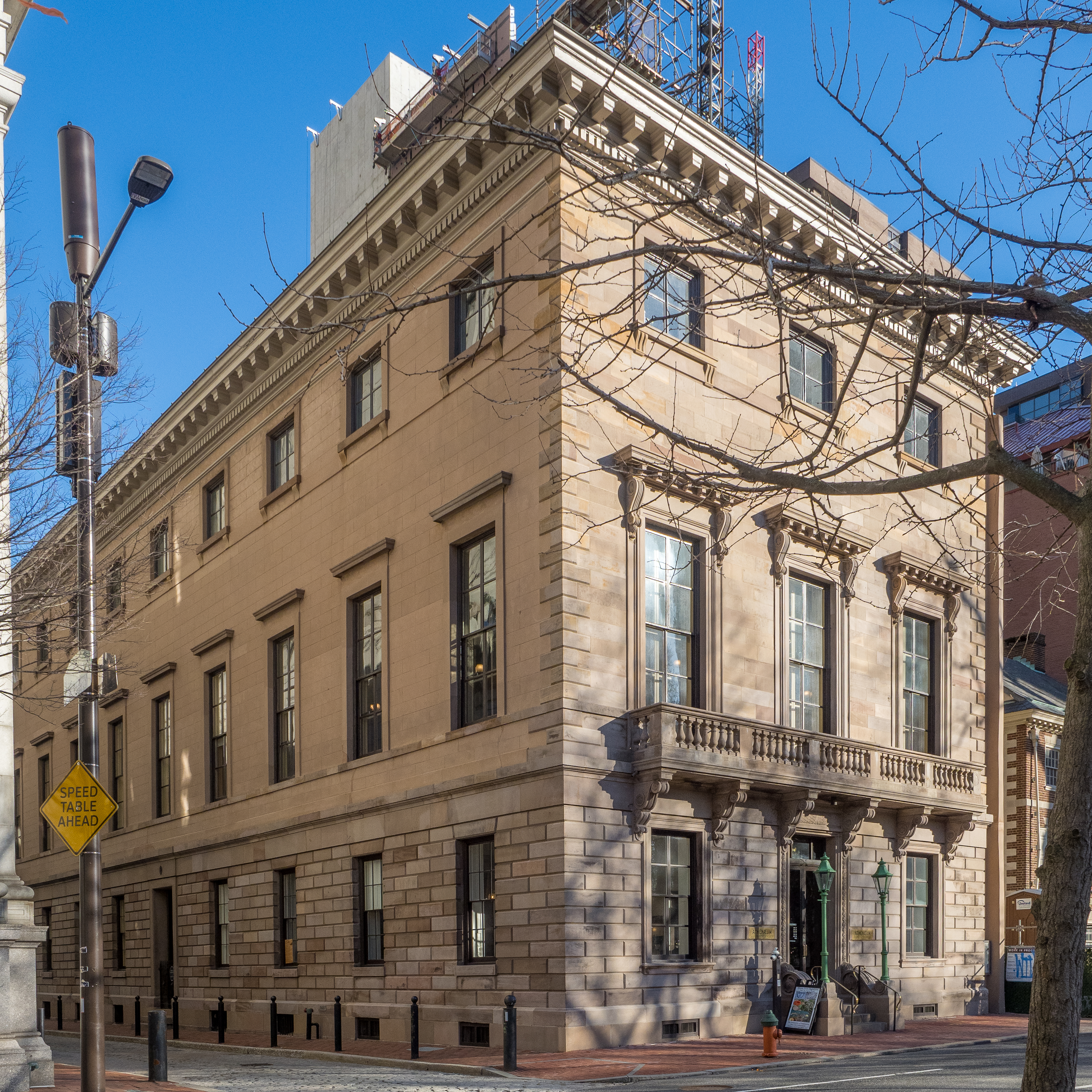
- The Athenaeum of Philadelphia in 2024
- Established: 1814
- Location: 219 S. 6th St. Philadelphia, Pennsylvania, U.S.
- Coordinates: 39.946871°N 75.150956°W
- Architect: John Notman
- Public transit access: SEPTA bus: 9, 21, 42
- Website: philaathenaeum.org
- Athenaeum of Philadelphia
- U.S. National Register of Historic Places
- U.S. National Historic Landmark
- Location within Philadelphia Location within Pennsylvania Location within the United States
- Built: 1845
- Architectural style: Italianate
- NRHP reference No.: 72001144

Significant dates
- Added to NRHP: February 1, 1972
- Designated NHL: December 8, 1976

The Athenaeum of Philadelphia, located at 219 S. 6th Street between St. James Place and Locust Street in the Society Hill section of Philadelphia, Pennsylvania, is a special collections membership library and museum founded in 1814. The Athenaeum's purpose, according to its organizational principles, is to collect materials "connected with the history and antiquities of America, and the useful arts, and generally to disseminate useful knowledge" for public benefit.

The Athenaeum's collections include architecture and interior design history, particularly for the period 1800 to 1945. The institution focuses on the history of American architecture and building technology, and houses architectural archives of 180,000 drawings, over 350,000 photographs, and manuscript holdings of about 1,000 American architects.

Since 1950, the Athenaeum has sponsored the annual Athenaeum Literary Award for works of fiction and non-fiction.

== Founding ==
The Athenaeum of Philadelphia was founded in 1814, as a non-profit subscription library “to disseminate useful knowledge.” Initially, the Athenaeum was housed in Philosophical Hall, at 104 S. 5th Street. It was next to Independence Hall and just across the street from The Library Company of Philadelphia (established in 1731). The Athenaeum was open for longer hours and provided more specialized periodicals and reference works. Many of its founders were members of both institutions.

Both the Library Company of Philadelphia and the Athenaeum were member-supported. The Athenaeum's founders included prominent Philadelphians like Nicholas Biddle, Horace Binney, George Cadwalader, Mathew Carey, Jacob Gratz, Benjamin Gratz, Chief Justice William Tilghman, and George and Roberts Vaux. The first public library in the city, the Free Library of Philadelphia, was not established until 1894, 80 years after the Athenaeum.

Members of the Athenaeum could bring guests as visitors, recording their names in the “Strangers’ Book” at the librarian’s desk. Visitors included John Quincy Adams, James Buchanan, Henry Clay, Millard Fillmore, Giuseppe Garibaldi, Andrew Jackson, Martin Van Buren, and the Marquis de LaFayette.

== Building ==
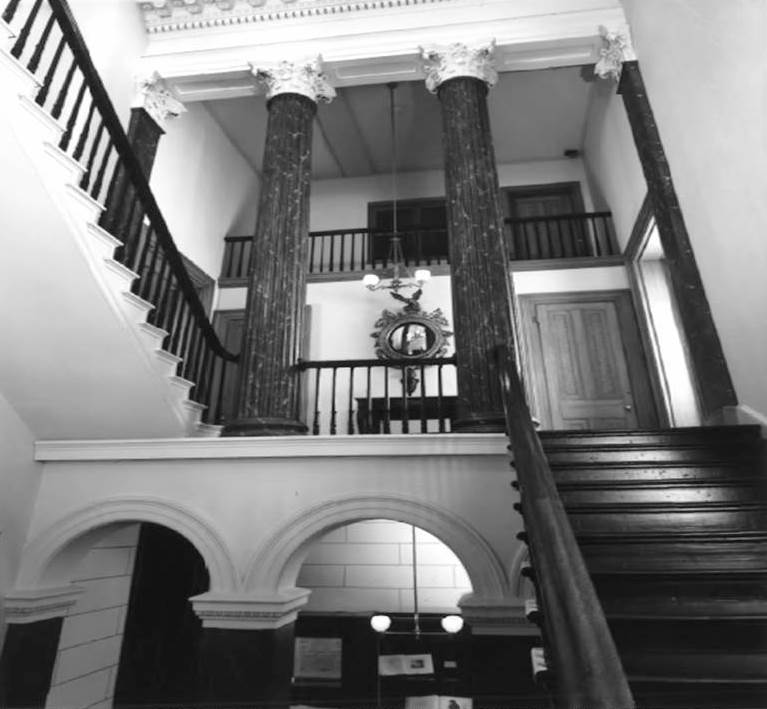
The Athenaeum's staircase in 1972

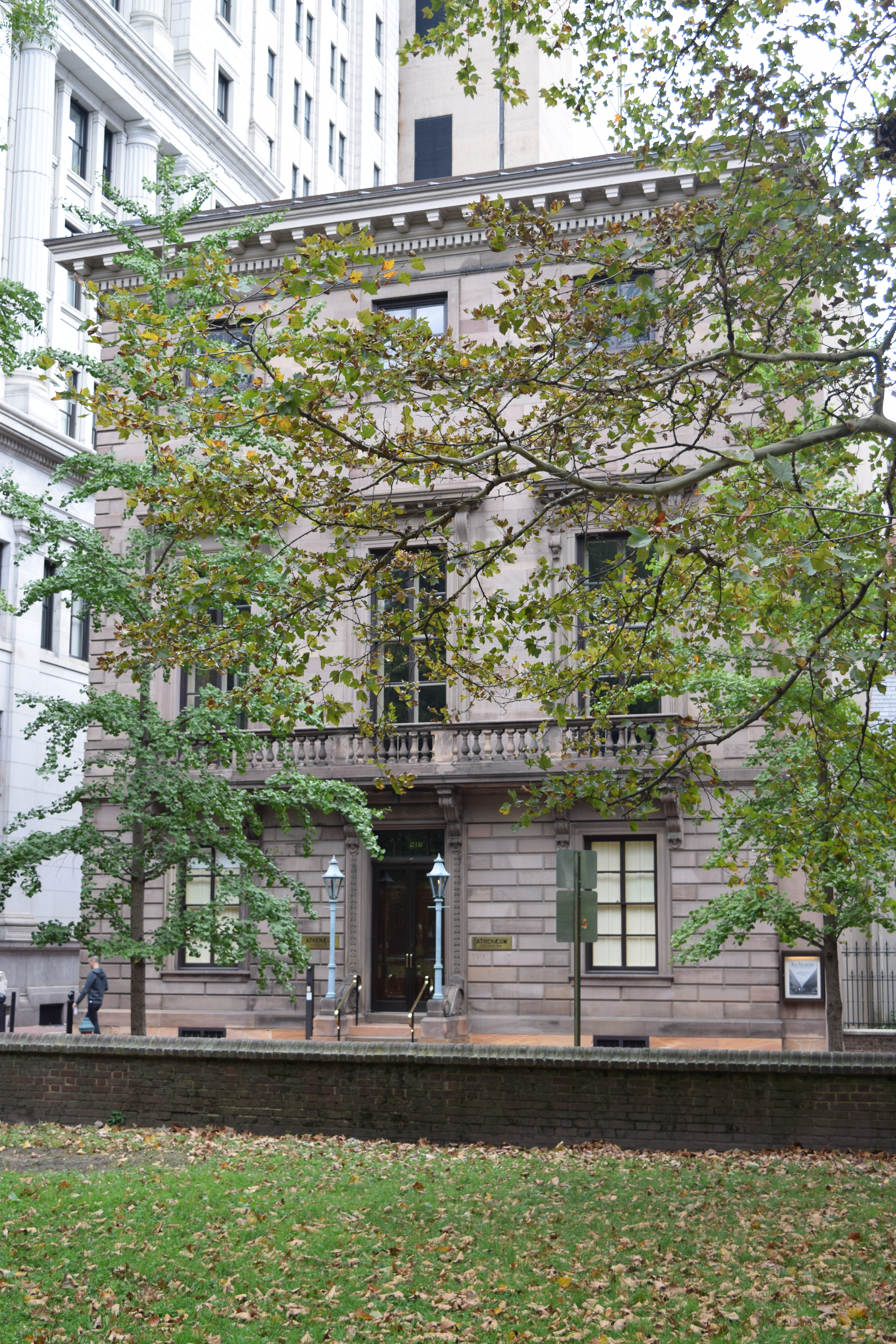
The Athenaeum's façade, September 2017

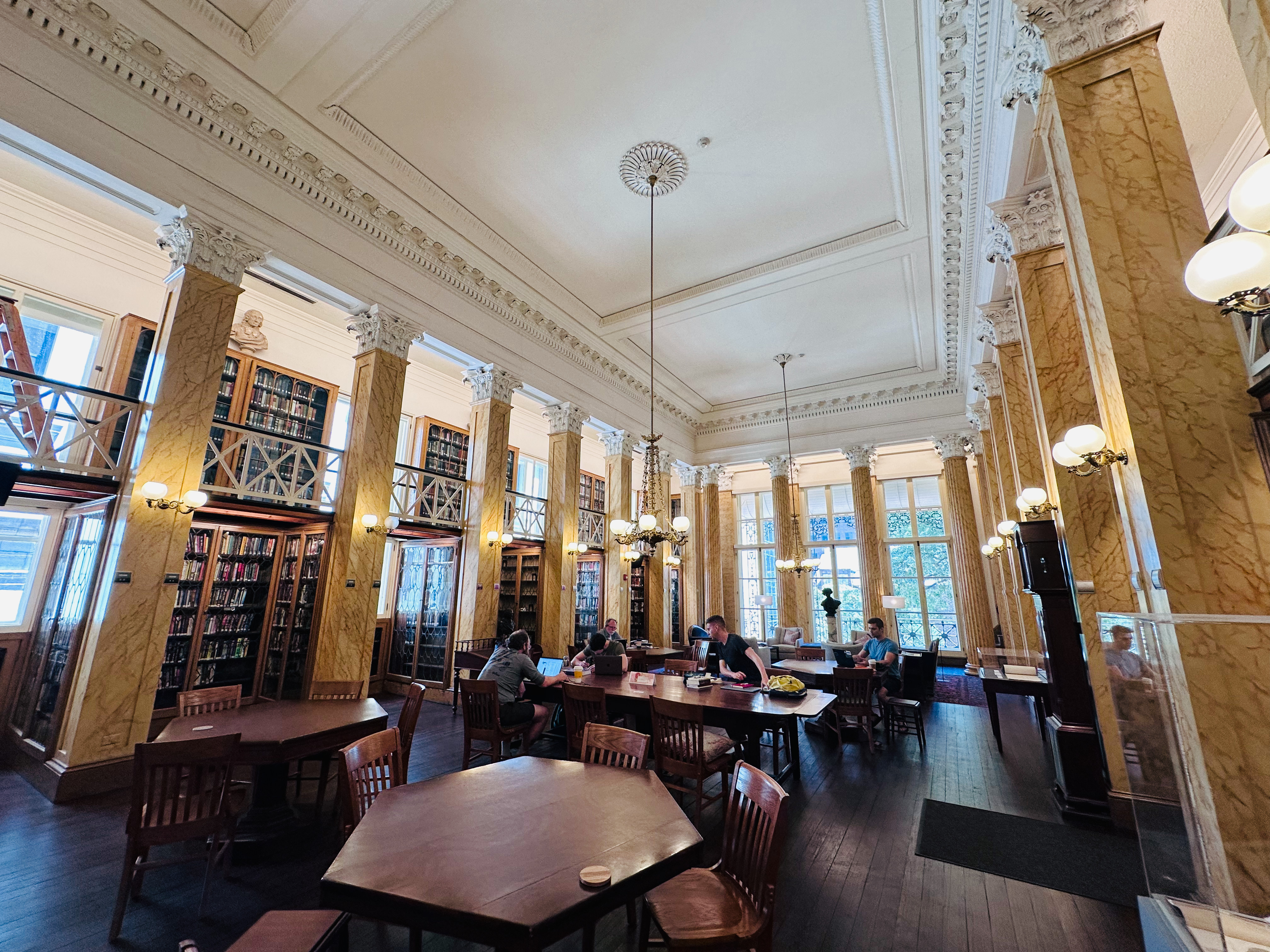
The Athenaeum Library, 2026

The will of Philadelphia druggist William Lehman (1779–1829) left $10,000 to the Athenaeum for “the acquisition of a suitable building.” In 1845, a lot was purchased on Sixth Street opposite Washington Square. John Notman, a Scottish architect who had emigrating to the United States in 1831, defeated major Philadelphia architects like William Strickland and John Haviland to win the architectural design competition for the building.

The building Notman designed was in the Italianate style, and was one of the first buildings in Philadelphia to be built of brownstone, although it was originally planned to be faced in marble. Brownstone was used because it was cheaper. Notman's design was influenced by the work of the English architect Charles Barry.

When the Athenaeum moved into the new building at 219 S. 6th St. in 1847, it only occupied the second floor. The others were rented out. The Historical Society of Pennsylvania was a tenant on the third floor. The Philadelphia chapter of the American Institute of Architects later became a tenant.

The building was declared a National Historic Landmark in 1976, as one of the nation's first examples of a building with a palazzo-style facade, and for its historic importance as an educational institution. In 2022, it underwent a major renovation, opening up the main floor and expanding the library’s reading room. The exterior was also substantially renovated and the facade cleaned.

== Collections ==
The opening of the Free Library of Philadelphia in 1894 was competition for the Athenaeum and other member-supported libraries in the Philadelphia area. Under the presidency of George Vaux (1908-1996) the Athenaeum redefined itself as a special-collections library that was still membership-based, but held public exhibitions and events. The original collection scope was expanded. Collections include Victorian material culture; America theater buildings; architecture and garden design; books and printing; and early maps and prints of Philadelphia. There are extensive holdings for stained-glass master Nicola D’Ascenzo and for decorative painter George Herzog.

Since the 1970s, the primary focus of the library’s research collections has become American architecture prior to 1930. Dealing with the work of architects, engineers, and builders, the archives include a wide range of materials such as architectural drawings, client records, photographs, and other supporting documentation. Its collections include architectural holdings for Thomas Ustick Walter, Paul Philippe Cret, Walter Mellor, Arthur I. Meigs, Louis Magaziner, and Theophilus P. Chandler, the founder of the University of Pennsylvania School of Architecture. The Athenaeum is also the official repository for the Philadelphia Chapter of the American Institute of Architects.

In 1999 the Athenaeum partnered with the William Penn Foundation and others to establish the multi-institutional Philadelphia Architects and Buildings Project. This project has created a free online digital archive of materials from over 25 Philadelphia-area repositories: the American Architects and Buildings Database.

In 2019, the Athenaeum of Philadelphia entered into an agreement with the libraries of the University of Pennsylvania to integrate their two collections, giving borrowing privilege to each other's patrons and making the Athenaeum's collection, which is focused on architecture, the built environment, and the decorative arts, searchable in Penn's online catalog.

== Athenaeum Literary Award ==
The Athenaeum Literary Award is a literary award presented by Athenaeum of Philadelphia since 1950. It is awarded to authors who are "bona fide residents of Philadelphia or Pennsylvania living within a radius of 30 miles of City Hall". Eligible works are of general fiction or non-fiction; technical, scientific, and juvenile books are not included. The award was established in 1950 by Charles Wharton Stork (1881–1971), who was a board member of the Athenaeum from 1919 until 1968.

Recipients

Source: Athenaeum Literary Award previous winners (1949–present)

=== 1940s ===
- 1949
  - John L. Lamonte, The World of the Middle Ages

=== 1950s ===
Award winners (1950-1959)
Year	Author	Title	Ref.
1950	Henry Neill Paul	The Royal Play of Macbeth	
1951	Arthur Hobson Quinn	The Literature of the American People	
1952	Nicholas Biddle Wainwright	A Philadelphia Story	
1953	Lawrence H. Gipson	The Great War for the Empire 1760-1763, vol. 8, The Culmination, 1760-17632	
1954	Davis Grubb	The Night of the Hunter	
1955	Conyers Read	Mr. Secretary and Queen Elizabeth	
1956	Livingston L. Biddle, Jr.	The Village Beyond	
1956	Samuel Noah Kramer	From the Tablets of Summer	
1957	Catherine Drinker Bowen	The Lion and the Throne	
1957	Bettina Linn	A Letter to Elizabeth	
1958	Lyon Sprague de Camp	An Elephant for Aristotle	
1958	Loren Eisley	Darwin's Century	
1959	John Edwin Canaday	Mainstreams of Modern Art: David to Picasso	

=== 1960s ===
Award winners (1960-1969)
Year	Author	Title	Ref.
1960	Edwin Wolf II, with John F. Fleming	Rosenbach: A biography	
1960	David Taylor	Storm the Last Rampart	
1961	Lauren R. Stevens	The Double Axe	
1961	Roy F. Nichols	The Stakes of Power, 1845-1877	
1962	Curtis Bok	Maria: A Tale of the Northeast Coast	
1962	Richard S. Dunn	Puritans and Yankees	
1962	Carleton S. Coon	The Origin of Races	
1963	Daniel Hoffman	The City of Satisfactions	
1963	Samuel Noah Kramer	The Sumerians	
1964	Kristin Hunter	God Bless the Child	
1964	Dorothy Shipley White	Seeds of Discord	
1964	Elizabeth Gray Vining	Take Heed of Loving Me	
1965	Laurence Davis Lafore	The Long Fuse	
1966	Edward S. Gifford, Jr.	Father Against the Devil	
1967	Edmund N. Bacon	Design of Cities	
1967	Daniel P. Mannix	The Fox and the Hound	
1968	Ernest Penney Earnest	Expatriates and Patriots	
1968	Robert Chester Smith	The Art of Portugal	
1969	Henry Clarence Pitz	The Brandywine Tradition	
1969	Chaim Potok	The Promise	

=== 1970s ===
Award winners (1970-1979)
Year	Author	Title	Ref.
1970	No award		
1971	Loren Eiseley	The Night Country	
1972	Jerre Mangione	The Dream and the Deal	
1973	John Maass	The Glorious Enterprise	
1974	John R. Coleman	Blue Collar Journal	
1975	Martin P. Snyder	City of Independence	
1976	No award		
1977	John Francis Marion	Famous and Curious Cemeteries	
1977	Barbara Rex	I Want to Be in Love Again	
1977	Seymour Adelman	The Moving Pageant	
1978	Elizabeth Gray Vining	Being Seventy	
1978	Peggy Anderson	Nurse	
1978	Anthony F. C. Wallace	Rockdale	
1978	Jan V. Westcott	A Woman of Quality	
1979	Dorothy Shipley White	Black Africa and De Gaulle	
1979	Richard J. Boyle	John Twachtman	
1979	E. Digby Baltzell	Puritan Boston and Quaker Philadelphia	

=== 1980s ===
Award winners (1980-1989)
Year	Author	Title	Ref.
1980	James C. Humes	Churchill: Speaker of the Century	
1980	Lois G. Forer	Criminals and Victims	
1980	Arthur R.G. Solmssen	A Princess in Berlin	
1981	Daniel Hoffman	Brotherly Love	
1981	Edgar P. Richardson	Charles Willson Peale and His World	
1981	Russell F. Weigley	Eisenhower's Lieutenants	
1981	John A. Lukacs	Philadelphia, Patricians & Philistines	
1981	David Bradley	The Chaneysville Incident	
1982	Desmond Ryan	Deadlines	
1982	Susan Gray Detweiler	George Washington's Chinaware	
1982	David R. Slavitt	Ringer	
1982	Jean Seder	Voices of Kensington	
1982	Seymour Shubin	The Captain	
1983	Helen H. Gemmill	E.L., the Bread Box Papers	
1983	Gerald Carson	The Dentist and the Empress	
1984	Jean Gordon Lee	Philadelphians and the China Trade, 1784-1844	
1984	Philip Chadwick Foster Smith	The Empress of China	
1984	Roland M. Frye	The Renaissance Hamlet	
1985	Ralph Keyes	Chancing It	
1985	Thomas Maeder	Crime and Madness	
1985	Carroll Smith-Rosenberg	Disorderly Conduct	
1986	David Eisenhower	Eisenhower: At War, 1943-1945	
1986	Michael Malone	Handling Sin	
1986	Julie Nixon Eisenhower	Pat Nixon	
1986	Barry Schwartz	The Battle for Human Nature	
1987	No award		
1988	Marilyn Gaull	English Romanticism	
1988	John Allen Paulos	Innumeracy	
1988	Barbara Holland	The Name of the Cat	
1989	Emily W. Sunstein	Mary Shelley	
1989	James Snyder	Medieval Art	
1989	Coral Lansbury	The Grotto	

=== 1990s ===
Award winners (1990-1999)
Year	Author	Title	Ref.
1990	Matthews Masayuki Hamabata	Crested Kimono	
1990	Camille Paglia	Sexual Personae	
1990	Paul Halpern	Time Journeys	
1990	Ora Mendels	A Taste for Treason	
1991	Elizabeth Johns	American Genre Painting	
1991	Roger Lane	William Dorsey's Philadelphia and Ours	
1991	Art Carey	The United States of Incompetence	
1992	Arthur Power Dudden	The America Pacific	
1993	Susan Q. Stranahan	Susquehanna, River of Dreams	
1993	Seymour I. Toll	A Judge Uncommon	
1994	Steve Lopez	Third and Indiana	
1994	Paul Fussell	The Anti-Egotist	
1994	Barry Schwartz	The Costs of Living	
1995	Witold Rybczynski	City Life	
1995	Thomas Childers	Wings of Morning	
1995	Susan Stewart	The Forest	
1996	Peter Conn	Pearl S. Buck: A Cultural Biography	
1996	Diane McKinney-Whetstone	Tumbling	
1997	David P. Silverman	Ancient Egypt	
1997	Kathleen A. Foster and Kenneth Finkel	Captain Watson's Travels in America	
1997	Mary Walton	Car	
1997	A. C. Elias, Jr.	Memoirs of Laetitia Pilkington	
1998	James J. O'Donnell	Avatars of the Word	
1998	Leonard Warren	Joseph Leidy: The Last Man Who Knew Everything	
1999	J. Welles Henderson and Rodney P. Carlisle	Jack Tar: A Sailor's Life, 1750–1910	
1999	Jonathan Weiner	Time, Love, Memory	
1999	Witold Rybczynski	A Clearing in the Distance	

=== 2000s ===
Award winners (2000-2009)
Year	Author	Title	Ref.
2000	Ben Yagoda	About Town; The New Yorker and the World It Made	
2000	Susan Sidlauskas	Body, Place, and Self in Nineteenth-Century Painting	
2000	George E. Thomas and William L. Price	Arts and Crafts to Modern Design	
2000	Patricia Tyson Stroud	The Emperor of Nature; Charles-Lucien Bonaparte and His World	
2001	No award		
2002	Charlene Mires	Independence Hall in American Memory	
2002	Jane Golden, Robin Rice, and Monica Yant Kinney	Philadelphia Murals and the Stories They Tell	
2003	Jack Repcheck	The Man Who Found Time	
2004	Roger W. Moss	Historic Sacred Places of Philadelphia	
2005	Kermit Roosevelt	In the Shadow of the Law	
2006	David Traxel	Crusader Nation: The United States in Peace and the Great War, 1898–1920	
2007	Jon Clinch	Finn: A Novel	
2008	Walter A. McDougall	Throes of Democracy: The American Civil War Era, 1829–1877	
2009	Richard Beeman	Plain, Honest Men: The Making of The American Constitution	

=== 2010s ===
Award winners (2010-2019)
Year	Author	Title	Ref.
2010	Stephen Fried	Appetite For America: How Visionary Businessman Fred Harvey Built a Railroad Hospitality Empire that Civilized the West	
2010	Robin Black	If I Loved You, I Would Tell You This: Stories	
2011	No award		
2012	Liz Moore	Heft: A Novel	
2012	Robert McCracken Peck	A Glorious Enterprise: The Academy of Natural Sciences of Philadelphia and the Making of American Science	
2012	Steven Ujifusa	A Man and His Ship: America’s Greatest Naval Architect and His Quest to Build the S. S. United States	
2013	Adrian Raine	The Anatomy of Violence: The Biological Roots of Crime	
2013	George H. Marcus	The Houses of Louis Kahn	
2014	Jessica Choppin Roney	Governed By A Spirit of Opposition	
2015	David Grazian	American Zoo: A Sociological Safari	
2015	Barbara Miller Lane	Houses for a New World: Builders and Buyers in American Suburbs	
2016	Judith E. Stein	Eye of the Sixties	
2016	Gino Segre	The Pope of Physics	
2017	Erica Armstrong Dunbar	Never Caught: the Washingtons' Relentless Pursuit of Their Runaway Slave Ona Judge	
2017	Carol Eaton Soltis	The Art of the Peales in the Philadelphia Museum of Art	
2018	Madeline Miller	Circe	
2018	Patrick Spero	Frontier Rebels: the Fight for Independence in the American West, 1765-1776	`
2019	Witold Rybczynski	Charleston Fancy	
2019	Edward Posnett	Strange Harvests	

=== 2020s ===
Award winners (2020-present)
Year	Author	Title	Ref.
2020	Lynn Miller and Therese Dolan	Salut! France Meets Philadelphia	
2020	Michele Harper	The Beauty in Breaking	
2021	Miles Orvell	Empire of Ruins	
2021	Quiara Alegría Hudes	My Broken Language	
2022	Will Bunch	After the Ivory Tower Falls	
2022	Laura Wolf-Powers	University City: History, Race, and Community in the Era of the Innovation District	
2022	John Lobell	The Philadelphia School and the Future of Architecture	
2023	David Amadio	Rug Man	
2023	David S. Barnes	Lazaretto	
2024	Emma Copley Eisenberg	Housemates	
2024	Elizabeth A. Athens	William Bartram's Visual Wonders: The Drawings of an American Naturalist	
2025	Ben Yagoda	Alias O. Henry: A Novel	
2025	Bench Ansfield	Born in Flames: The Business of Arson and the Remaking of the American City	

== See also ==
- List of National Historic Landmarks in Philadelphia
- National Register of Historic Places listings in Center City, Philadelphia
