= David Barnes =

David Barnes may refer to:

- Dave Barnes (born 1978), American singer-songwriter
- David Barnes (archer) (born 1986), Australian archer
- David Barnes (boxer) (born 1981), British boxer
- David Barnes (cricketer) (born 1982), English cricketer
- David Barnes (footballer) (born 1961), English footballer
- David Barnes (politician) (1895–1970), New Zealand politician
- David Barnes (rugby union) (born 1976), English rugby union player
- David Barnes (sailor) (1958–2020), New Zealand America's Cup sailor
- David L. Barnes (1760–1812), U.S. District Court of Rhode Island judge and party in 1791 case, West v. Barnes
- David S. Barnes, American historian of science
- David Wilson Barnes (born 1972), American actor
