= Karla F. C. Holloway =

American academic, writer and activist

Karla Francesca Holloway
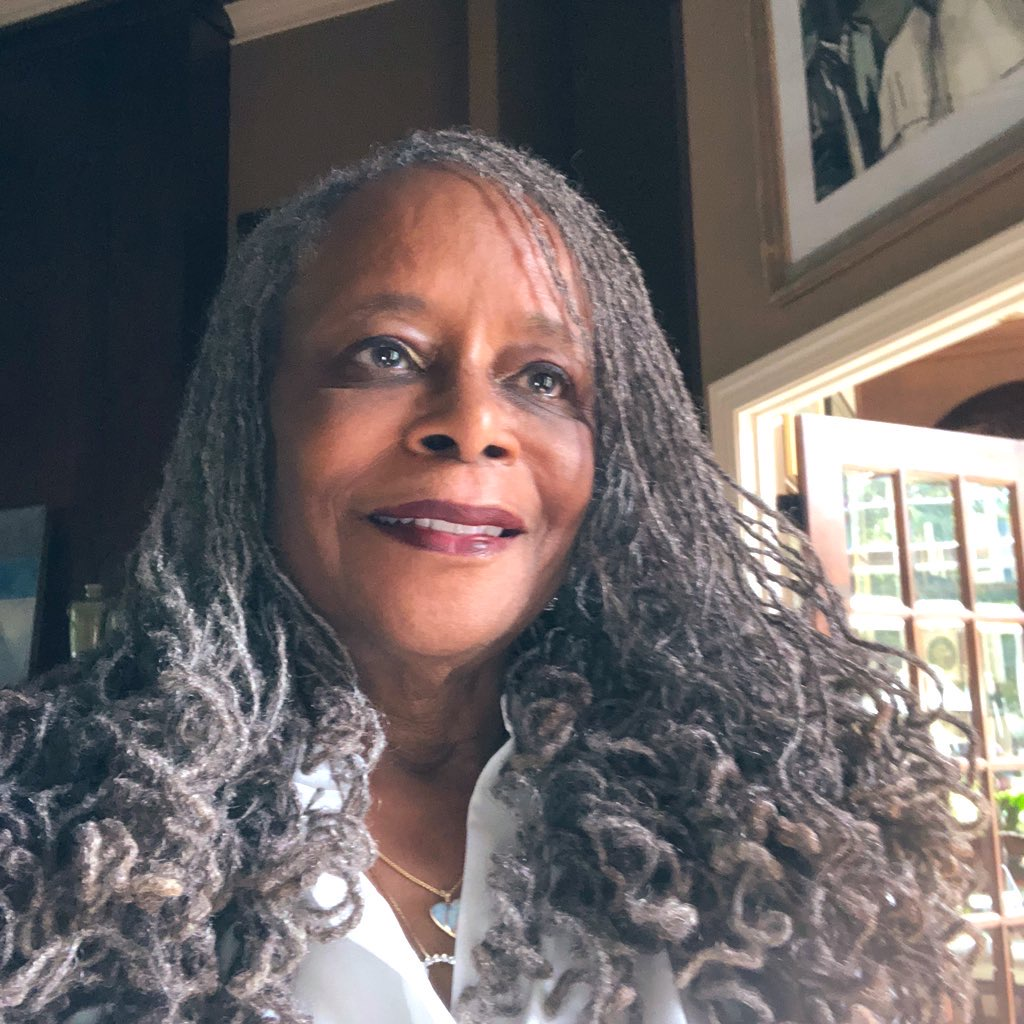
- Karla Holloway at home in Wake Forest, NC 2023
- Born: September 29, 1949
- Education: Talladega College (A.B., 1971); Michigan State University (M.A.,1973; Ph.D., 1978)
- Occupations: Scholar, author, professor

Karla Francesca Holloway (née Clapp; September 29, 1949) is an American academic. She is James B. Duke Professor of English & Professor of Law at Duke University, and holds appointments in the Duke University School of Law as well as the university's Department of English, Department of African & African American Studies, and Program in Women's Studies. Holloway is a member of The Wintergreen Women Writers Collective

== Early life and education ==
Holloway's early life was spent in Buffalo, New York, the middle daughter of prominent educators Claude D. and Ouida H. Clapp. She received an A.B. From Talladega College. Part of her undergraduate credits were earned at Wroxton College (Wroxton Abbey), where she studied British literature, politics and economics, and part were earned at Harvard University where she studied Linguistics.

Holloway received an M.A. from Michigan State University, an M.L.S. from Duke University School of Law, and a Ph.D. in American Literature and Linguistics from Michigan State University. Her dissertation, about the anthropologist Zora Neale Hurston, was titled "A Critical Investigation of Literary and Linguistic Structures in the Fiction of Zora Neale Hurston".

== Professional activities ==
Holloway has been a member of the Duke faculty since 1994. Previously she taught at North Carolina State. She was hired, she later recalled, because Henry Louis Gates Jr. "had just left for Harvard and Duke suddenly needed someone to teach a night course that had already been scheduled for Gates."

She has served on the boards of Duke University's Center for Documentary Studies, and Princeton University's Council on the Study of Women and Gender. She has been affiliated with Duke University's Institute on Care at the End of Life, and with the Trent Center for Bioethics and Medical Humanities. She was the first African American woman to serve as a department chair (African & African-American Studies). While chair, she led the program to full departmental status with the authority to hire and tenure its own faculty.

Her teaching and research focusses on African American cultural studies, gender, biocultural studies, law, and ethics. Professor Holloway's books primarily analyze race, gender, literature, and especially the writings of African-American women. Referring to twentieth-century African-American women authors, Holloway wrote the following, which has been favorably quoted by others in her field:

Recursive structures accomplish a blend between figurative processes that are reflective (like a mirror) and symbolic processes whose depth and resonance make them reflexive. This combination results in texts that are at once emblematic of the culture they describe as well as interpretive of this culture.

In 1999, she became the first African American woman to serve as a dean of faculty at Duke. She was Dean of the Faculty of Humanities and Social Sciences until 2004, when she took a leave of absence to attend Duke Law School, earning her Master of Legal Studies (2005). She is a current member of its faculty.

Holloway was a founding co-director of the John Hope Franklin Center and the Franklin Humanities Institute. She is a member of the Hastings Center, an elected association of leading bioethics researchers and also serves on the Faculty Scholars in Bioethics Board of the Greenwall Foundation.

In 2013, she was named to the Institute of Medicine's Committee on Transforming Care at the End of Life, within the National Academies of the United States. She served on this committee with 20 other members from around the country.

She retired from Duke University as James B. Duke Professor Emerita in June 2017.

In May, 2023, Professor Holloway was resident writer in Arrow Rock, MO at the Persimmon Creek Artists and Writers Residency.

== Books ==
Professor Holloway has written ten books to date, which can be summarized as follows, in chronological order.

- New Dimensions of Spirituality: A BiRacial and BiCultural Reading of the Novels of Toni Morrison. Westport (1987; with S. Demetrakopoulos). This book is a series of essays about Toni Morrison's first four novels: The Bluest Eye, Sula, Song of Solomon, and Tar Baby. The coauthors, both professors of English, each write one chapter on each novel, as well as a chapter of introduction, "personal reveries", and a conclusion. The writing is relatively free of academic jargon. However, Demetrakopoulos brings to bear an interest in women's studies and Jungian psychology, whereas Holloway's interest is more in black studies and linguistics.

- The Character of the Word: The Texts of Zora Neale Hurston (1987)

This 1987 book follows up on Holloway's 1978 doctoral dissertation about the anthropologist Zora Neale Hurston. According to Cynthia Davis and Verner Mitchell, this book by Holloway is a "rather dense study of linguistic codes in Hurston's novels." Davis and Mitchell acknowledge that the book does "usefully explore Hurston's battle against pejorative conceptions of dialect".

- Moorings & Metaphors: Figures of Culture and Gender in Black Women's Literature (1992)

This 1992 study considers the ways that cultural tradition is reflected in the language and figures of black women's writing, covering works of Gloria Naylor, Alice Walker, Ama Ata Aidoo, Ntozake Shange, Buchi Emecheta, Octavia Butler, Efua Sutherland, Gayl Jones, and particularly focusing on Toni Morrison's Beloved and Flora Nwapa's Efuru. Analyzing the work of contemporary African-American and West African writers, Holloway draws connections across two continents.

- Codes of Conduct: Race, Ethics, and the Color of Our Character (1995)

In Codes of Conduct, Holloway departs from the formality of scholarly prose to meditate about her experiences as a black person in the larger society, the experiences of her son, and the experiences of African-American women who faced public trials and tribulations; in the latter category, she places Tawana Brawley, Anita Hill, Phillis Wheatley, Zora Neale Hurston, and Whoopi Goldberg. This book also discusses the visual power of the black female body, the resonance and drama of language, and African-American community life.

- Passed On: African American Mourning Stories (2002)

Holloway argues that the susceptibility of African-Americans to early death has had unique cultural effects, and this 2002 book examines the "life of death" in that culture. The book is a memorial for Bem Kayin Holloway, her adopted son who died in an attempted prison break, while serving up to 95 years in prison after pleading guilty to breaking and entering, robbery, rape, and attempted murder. At the time of his death, Bem was also facing first degree murder charges for the deaths of two other women. Karla Holloway studied mourning rituals and visited funeral homes throughout the United States as well as absorbing evidence from Richard Wright's death in Paris, black cult members' deaths in Jonestown, and other episodes. This is a survivor's tale, and a mordant humor surfaces occasionally.

- BookMarks: Reading in Black and White — A Memoir (2006)

This 2006 book by Holloway profiles 25 black authors who tended in their memoirs to cite the white giants of English-language literature, while citing markedly fewer black authors, or merely listing the latter as afterthoughts. Holloway interprets this tendency of black authors to "bookmark" primarily white authors as a signal from the memoirists of their supremely literate mastery of Anglo-American literature.

- Private Bodies/Public Texts: Race, Gender, and a Cultural Bioethics (2011)

In Private Bodies/Public Texts, Holloway examines instances where personal medical information has been forced into the public sphere, and says that women and African Americans are often the victims. In view of history from Henrietta Lacks to Terri Schiavo, Holloway argues that some populations are more vulnerable to this phenomenon than others.

- Legal Fictions: Constituting Law, Composing Literature (2014)

In Legal Fictions, Professor Holloway explores the relationship between U.S. literature and U.S. jurisprudence, especially the effect that race concepts in law have had upon literary fiction. Holloway sees such relationships in Toni Morrison's Beloved, in Charles R. Johnson's Middle Passage, in David Bradley's The Chaneysville Incident and in Ralph Ellison's Invisible Man.

- A Death in Harlem: A Novel (2019)

In 2019, Northwestern University Press published Holloway's debut novel, a mystery set in Jazz Age Harlem. The book's point of departure is the climactic ending of Passing (novel), the 1929 novel by Nella Larsen. In it, Holloway introduces Weldon Haynie Thomas, "Harlem’s first colored policeman." Kirkus Reviews wrote that "Holloway brings her period, place, and people alive and provides as a bonus a most unexpected culprit."

- Gone Missing in Harlem: A Novel (2021)

In her highly anticipated second novel, Karla Holloway evokes the resilience of a family whose journey traces the river of America’s early twentieth century. The Mosby family migrates north to the Harlem of their aspirations and arrive as Harlem staggers under the flu pandemic that follows the First World War. DeLilah Mosby and her daughter, Selma, meet difficulties with backbone and resolve to make a home for themselves in the city, and Selma has a baby, Chloe. The panic of the early thirties is embodied in the kidnapping and murder of the infant son of the nation’s dashing young aviator, Charles Lindbergh. A transfixed public follows the manhunt in the press and on the radio. Then Chloe goes missing—but her disappearance does not draw the same attention. Wry and perceptive Weldon Haynie Thomas, the city’s first “colored” policeman, takes the case. The urgent investigation tests Thomas’s abilities to draw out the secrets Harlem harbors, untangling the color-coded connections and relationships that keep company with greed, ghosts, and grief. With nuanced characters, lush historical detail, and a lyrical voice, Gone Missing in Harlem Northwestern University Press affirms the restoring powers of home and family. Buzz Feed News called it "unputdownable...a spellbinding story about family, grief, and perseverance, full of rich and resilient characters you’ll fall in love with." Publishers Weekly starred review.

- The Thursday Lady: A Novel (2027)

“Part political thriller, part spiritual reckoning.” —Bernice L. McFadden, author of Sugar.

The Thursday Lady is a morally ambiguous mystery where a good book can be the perfect weapon. Published by Rootstock Publishing.

== Group of 88 ==
During the Duke lacrosse case of 2006-07, in which the men's lacrosse team were falsely accused of raping a black woman at a party, Holloway coordinated the so-called "Group of 88" statement. This was an advertisement that she and Professor Wahneema Lubiano crafted for the Duke student newspaper, describing concerns about racism and sexism that the incident allegedly raised, and discussing "what happened to this woman". Historian KC Johnson and journalist Stuart Taylor Jr. note that Holloway and Lubiano made it a point to publish the statement before the release of DNA results, which prosecutor Mike Nifong had said would be determinative, and before any indictments. The ad proved polarizing.

As the facts of the case became clearer, Duke president Richard H. Brodhead, who had barred the indicted players from campus, invited them back. In response, Holloway resigned from a campus committee, stating that she "could no longer work in good faith with this breach of common trust", and she charged the university with failing to wait for a critical judicial decision. According to Johnson and Taylor, Holloway had previously shown little deference to judicial decisions when she said that, "the seriousness of the matter cannot be finally or fully adjudicated in the courts" because "justice inevitably has an attendant social construction."

Holloway also announced that she had overheard that there was a witness to racial slurs by lacrosse players. No such witness was ever produced, say Johnson and Taylor, but the Wilmington Journal printed the story. In 2006, Holloway said that she would sign the Group of 88's ad again "in a heartbeat."

== Personal life ==
Holloway's husband, Russell Holloway, is an Associate Dean for Corporate and Industry Relations at the Pratt School of Engineering at Duke. Her daughter, Ayana Holloway Arce, is an Associate Professor of Physics, also at Duke University. She also adopted a 4-year-old boy, Bem Kayin Holloway.

In 1998, at age 21, Bem Holloway was charged with breaking and entering, rape, robbery, and attempted murder and pleaded guilty, receiving a sentence of up to 95 years in prison. In 1999, Bem was shot dead by prison guards during a prison escape attempt.

At the time of his death Bem was facing first degree murder charges for the deaths of two women, including Peggy Carr. Karla Holloway dedicated the prologue (pgs 9-14) of her book, Passed On, to the memory of her son. She wrote of him "We knew North Carolina judicial history, we knew the national tendency to impose the ultimate punishment for crimes committed against white victims by black men." She specifically requested a black funeral home to care for her son's remains, stating, "We expected them to treat him as a child who was loved, I don't think I could have had that conversation with a white funeral director."
