= Ujifusa =

Ujifusa is a surname. Notable people with the surname include:

- Allannah Ujifusa, American high school teacher and Intel Science Talent Search finalist, namesake of asteroid 27372 Ujifusa
- Linda Ujifusa, American attorney and politician
- Steven Ujifusa, American naval historian
