= Masada myth =

Early Zionist retelling of the siege of Masada

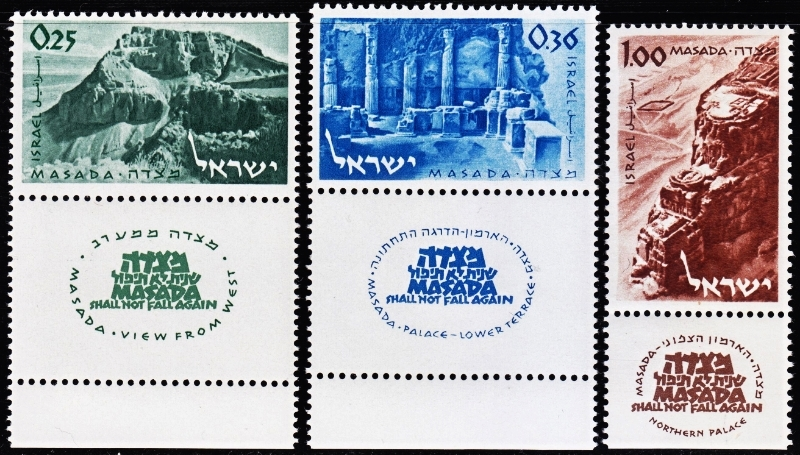
1965 Israeli postage stamps, with the phrase "Masada shall not fall again"

The Masada myth is the early Zionist retelling of the siege of Masada, and an Israeli national myth. The Masada myth depicts the Zealot defenders of Masada as national heroes in the First Jewish–Roman War, who killed themselves rather than surrendering to the Roman army. Josephus, the only written source for the event, had the Sicarii as the defenders of Masada using words to describe them that have been translated as "bandits", "terrorists" and "murderers", and recorded them killing their fellow Jews rather than fighting Romans. Josephus does describe a mass suicide, though many modern scholars doubt this account. Skeletons at the site were not all found in a single location as he described it. American Archaeologist Jodi Magness has written that archaeology cannot prove or disprove the account of Josephus because the human remains found can be interpreted differently.

The modern myth version first emerged and was promoted in Mandatory Palestine and later Israel. Despite the modern academic consensus, popular accounts by figures like Yigal Yadin and Moshe Pearlman have perpetuated the myth, influencing public perception. In the myth narrative, the defenders of Masada were depicted as national symbols of heroism, freedom, and national dignity. This narrative emphasized Josephus's account, highlighting the defenders' courage and resistance while omitting the details of their violence against Jews, as well as certain elements of their final mass suicide. The early Zionist settlers wished to reconnect with ancient Jewish history, and thus used the Masada myth narrative to establish a sense of national heroism and to promote patriotism. In the aftermath of the Holocaust, and the reported role of a poem about Masada in inspiring the Warsaw Ghetto Uprising, the story's themes of resilience and isolation resonated with and circulated in Israeli public discourse, youth movements, and film media.

The widespread embrace of the Masada myth in Israel started waning in the late twentieth century. Israelis advocating for compromise in the Israeli–Palestinian peace process associated Masada's symbolism as an uncompromising last stand with right-wing nationalism, and the story became less prominent as a broad national symbol. The Masada myth's central role in Israeli collective memory has puzzled scholars due to its structural differences from other national myths: Josephus's account was not an origin myth, did not provide formative context, and was not heroic in nature. It has been described as "an extreme example of the construction of national memory", as it had no prior basis in Jewish collective memory.

== Historic event ==
The only original source on the siege of Masada is the Jewish-Roman historian Josephus Flavius, who, though not a witness to this event, had participated in the broader Jewish Revolt before joining the Roman side. Josephus describes the defenders of Masada as Sicarii, an extreme Jewish group known for assassination. He further described the Sicarii using words that have been translated as "bandits", "terrorists" and "murderers". The Sicarii's activities had been suppressed by 65 C.E. The following year, under Menahem ben Judah, they seized Herod’s fortress at Masada, slaughtering its Roman garrison and then conducted a raid on Jerusalem, burning the upper city and its archives and assassinating the High Priest in Jerusalem, Eleazar ben Hanania. They then withdrew to Masada, and plundered local villages, such as Ein Gedi, where, during the observation of Passover, they massacred over 700 women and children. Josephus also states that the Sicarii did not participate in the war with Rome between 66 and 73 CE. In his account, the denizens of Masada were persuaded to die en masse by Eleazar ben Ya'ir. Most were purportedly killed by ten rebels, and only seven survived by hiding, two old women and five children. Most recent archaeology show that events at Masada follow neither the account of Josephus nor that of the myth.

In a 1986 article investigating the national myth by Barry Schwartz, Yael Zerubavel and Bernice M. Barnett, it was described as "one of the least significant and least successful events in ancient Jewish history".

By contrast, the mythical narrative depicts the Sicarii as morally upright anti-Roman freedom fighters, (Note: 'During the years when Vespasian besieged the Judaeans the Sicarii did not furnish aid to the Judaeans nor did they venture to harass the Romans. Though the terrain in the environs of Masada was favorable for ambuscades, the Sicarii did not take advantage of this and did not ambush the Romans, nor did they organize any guerilla warfare against the Romans. Even when finally besieged by the Romans they did not move to assail them. At other fortresses that were besieged by the Romans, such as Jotapata, the Judaeans counter attacked and assailed the Romans with missiles, rocks and even poured boiling water on the enemy.' Many Judaeans distinguished themselves by great heroism in defending their cities and fortresses. There were no counter-attacks against the Romans when the Sicarii were besieged in Masada.') who only escaped to Masada after the fall of Jerusalem, and who unanimously chose death over slavery.

== Evolution ==
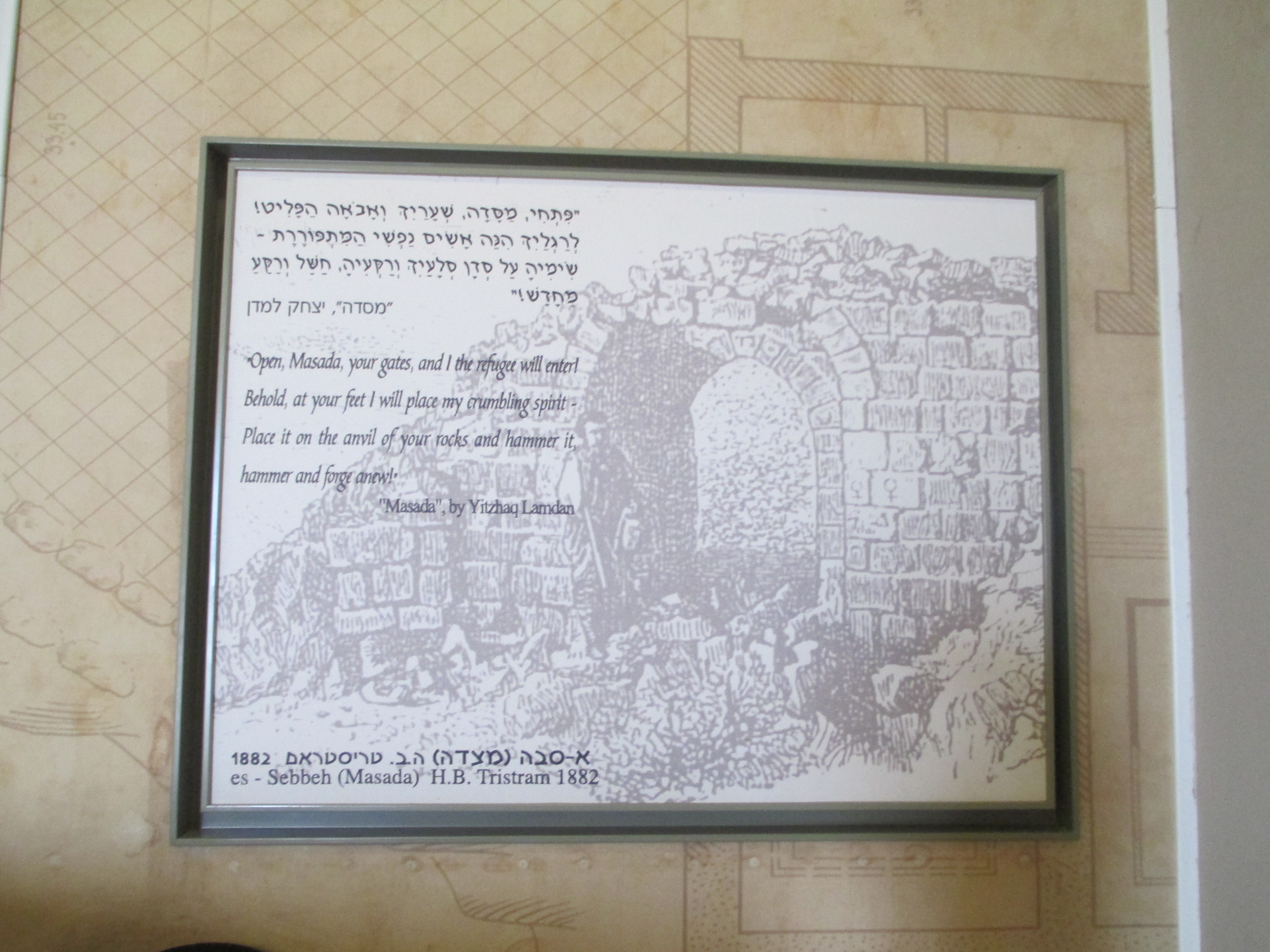
Lamdan's 1927 Masada poem in Masada visitors center

In 1927, shortly after the first Hebrew translation of Josephus was published, 27-year-old Yitzhak Lamdan published the Hebrew epic poem, Masada: A Historical Epic, about the Jewish struggle for survival in a world full of enemies. The poem described Masada as a symbol for the Land of Israel and the Zionist enterprise, and as both a refuge and a potential trap. The poem was highly influential, but the "potential trap" aspect was left out in its mainstream Zionist reception and interpretation. According to literary scholar and cultural historian David G. Roskies, Lamdan's poem later inspired the uprising in the Warsaw Ghetto.

The transformation of Masada into a symbol of modern Israeli heroism has been attributed to Shmarya Guttman. In 1942, through organized treks and advocacy, Guttman established Masada as a Zionist emblem. The Masada myth often whitewashed Josephus's account, overlooking the Sicarii's violent actions and presenting them instead as heroic defenders. This transformation was facilitated by a constellation of events in the twentieth century, including knowledge of the Holocaust. Between February and July 1942, the Masada ethos became deeply rooted in youth movements and public discourse. The myth narrative resonated strongly, symbolizing Jewish resilience and loneliness during the Holocaust. Youth movements and Palmach squads integrated this ethos into their activities, reinforcing its significance.

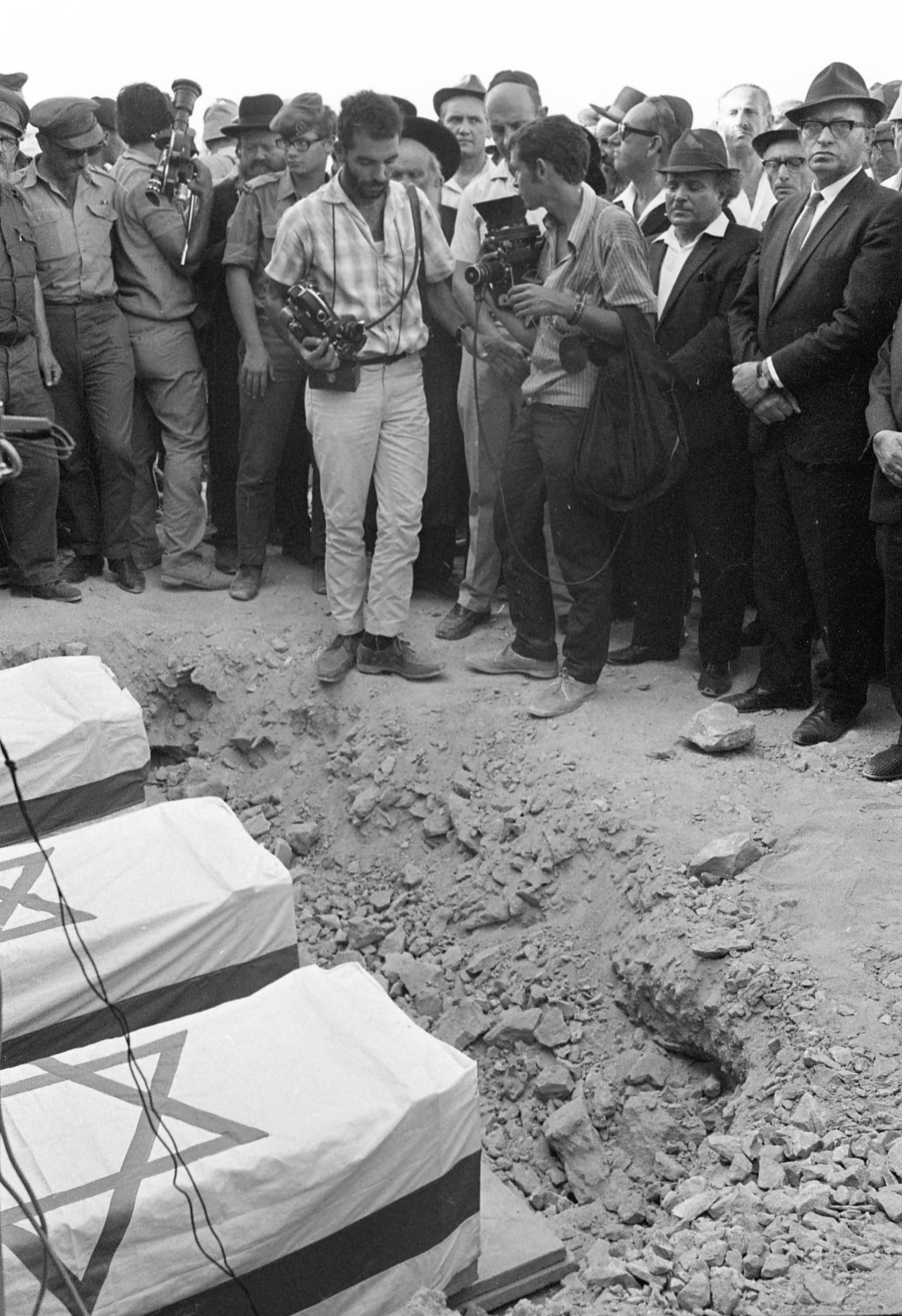
1969 Israeli state funeral for 27 skeletons found in the excavation of Masada. This photo includes Yigael Yadin, Menachem Begin and Yisrael Yeshayahu Sharabi.

Archeologist Yigal Yadin, who carried out research at Masada from 1963 to 1965, sought to portray the defenders as committed supporters of a national resistance led by the Zealots. For example, Yadin interpreted scrolls found at Masada as evidence of diverse sectarian support. However, these scrolls might have been looted from nearby villages, and Josephus's identification of the defenders as Sicarii suggests a more complex picture. In 1969 the Israeli government held a state funeral for 27 skeletons found during Yadin's excavations. Since the skeletons were later admitted by Yadin to have been found together with pig bones, later archaeologists suggested the bones may well have been those of local Christians or Roman soldiers.

A 1981 miniseries and, later, full-length movie, Masada, was broadcast, which further popularized the myth narrative.

According to historian Tessa Rajak, the Masada myth's prominence in the collective memory of Israel has surprised scholars because the original Josephus narrative it draws from structurally differs from common national myths, which usually are origin myths, provide formative context, or narrate heroics. Citing the narrative's absence from Jewish collective memory prior to its popularization in the twentieth century, historian Shlomo Sand called the Masada myth "an extreme example of the construction of national memory".

== Decline ==
The Masada myth began to decline in the latter half of the 20th century; this has been attributed to the changing political and social dynamics within Israel. During the 1970s and 1980s, Israeli society faced complex challenges, including debates over the occupied territories and the peace process. The rigid and uncompromising stance symbolized by Masada became associated with right-wing nationalism and was increasingly viewed negatively by those advocating for peace and compromise. As a result, Masada’s significance as a national symbol waned, with fewer youth and military groups visiting the site, and official ceremonies shifting to other locations.

In parallel with these changing political dynamics, scholars and intellectuals began to critically analyze the historical sources, particularly the writings of Josephus, to reveal discrepancies and fabrications within the popular myth. Although most scholars have focused on the differences between the modern myth and Josephus's version, others have focused on the question of the accuracy of Josephus's narrative.

Notable scholars who have studied the phenomenon include Bernard Lewis (1975), Baila R. Shargel (1979), Yael Zerubavel (1980), Edward M. Bruner and Phyllis Gorfain (1984), Barry Schwartz, Yael Zerubavel, and Bernice M. Barnett (1986), Robert Paine (1991, 1994), Pierre Vidal-Naquet (1983, 1991), Anita Shapira (1992) and Nachman Ben-Yehuda (1996). Rhetorical usage of the myth continues in modern Israeli political discourse, particularly in discussions of the Israeli–Palestinian conflict.

== See also ==
- Politics of archaeology in Israel and Palestine

== Bibliography ==
- Amossy, Ruth (2012). "From National Consensus to Political Dissent: The Rhetorical Uses of the Masada Myth in Israel". Rivista Italiana di Filosofia del Linguaggio. 6 (3): 1–15.
- Ben-Yehuda, Nachman (2002). Sacrificing Truth: Archaeology and the Myth of Masada. Humanities Press. ISBN 9781573929530.
- —————————— (1996). Masada Myth: Collective Memory and Mythmaking in Israel. University of Wisconsin Press. ISBN 978-0-299-14833-1.
- Brighton, Mark Andrew (2009). The Sicarii in Josephus's Judean War: Rhetorical Analysis and Historical Observations. Early Judaism and Its Literature, 27. Atlanta: Society of Biblical Literature. ISBN 9781589834064. OCLC 758719597.
- Cockburn, Patrick (1997-03-30). "Ancient battle divides Israel as Masada 'myth' unravels". The Independent.
- Green, Arnold H. (1997). "Review: History and Fable, Heroism and Fanaticism: Nachman Ben-Yehuda's "The Masada Myth"". Brigham Young University Studies. 36 (3): 403–424. ISSN 0007-0106. JSTOR 43044142.
- Horsley, Richard A. (1979). "The Sicarii: Ancient Jewish "Terrorists"". The Journal of Religion. 59 (4). University of Chicago Press: 435–458. doi:10.1086/486729. ISSN 0022-4189. JSTOR 1202887.
- Lewis, Bernard (1975). "Chapter One: Masada and Cyrus". History: Remembered, Recovered, Invented. Benjamin Gottesman lectures. Princeton University Press. ISBN 978-0-691-03547-5.
- Magness, Jodi (2019). Masada: From Jewish Revolt to Modern Myth. Princeton University Press. ISBN 978-0-691-21677-5.
- Olick, Jeffrey K. (September 2003). "Review:Sacrificing Truth: Archaeology and the Myth of Masada by Nachman Ben-Yehuda". American Journal of Sociology. 109 (2): 536–538. doi:10.1086/381625. JSTOR 10.1086/381625.
- Rajak, Tessa (2016). "14 Josephus, Jewish Resistance and the Masada Myth". In Collins, John J.; Manning, J.G. (eds.). Revolt and Resistance in the Ancient Classical World and the Near East. BRILL. pp. 219–233. doi:10.1163/9789004330184_015. ISBN 978-90-04-33018-4.
- Rapoport, David C. (1983). "Fear and Trembling: Terrorism in Three Religious Traditions". American Political Science Review. 78 (3): 658–677. doi:10.2307/1961835. ISSN 0003-0554. JSTOR 1961835.
- Sand, Shlomo (2012). The Invention of the Land of Israel: From Holy Land to Homeland. Translated by Forman, Geremy. Verso Books. ISBN 978-1-84467-946-1.
- Schwartz, Barry; Zerubavel, Yael; Barnett, Bernice M. (1986). "The Recovery of Masada: A Study in Collective Memory". The Sociological Quarterly. 27 (2). Wiley: 147–164. doi:10.1111/j.1533-8525.1986.tb00254.x. ISSN 0038-0253. JSTOR 4106206.
- Shapira, Anita (1992). "Massada as a Myth of Heroism". Land and Power: The Zionist Resort to Force, 1881-1948. Stanford studies in Jewish history and culture. Oxford University Press. pp. 310–319. ISBN 978-0-8047-3776-0.
- Shavit, Ari (2013). My Promised Land: the triumph and tragedy of Israel. Scribe Publications Pty Limited. ISBN 978-1-922072-51-1.
- Sheldon, Rose Mary (1998). "Review: The Masada Myth: Collective Memory and Mythmaking in Israel". The Journal of Military History. 62 (2): 448–450. doi:10.2307/120774. JSTOR 120774.
- Shepkaru, Shmuel (2020). "Review: Masada: From Jewish Revolt to Modern Myth by Jodi Magness". Journal of Religion and Violence. 8 (3): 322–325. doi:10.5840/jrv20208382. JSTOR 27212331.
- Silberman, Neil Asher (1989). Between Past and Present: Archaeology, Ideology, and Nationalism in the Modern Middle East. Doubleday.
- Zeitlin, Solomon (April 1967). "The Sicarii and Masada". The Jewish Quarterly Review. 57 (4): 251–270. doi:10.2307/1453654. JSTOR 1453654.
- Zerubavel, Yael (1995a). "The multivocality of a national myth: Memory and counter-memories of Masada". Israel Affairs. 1 (3): 110–128. doi:10.1080/13517129508719340. ISSN 1353-7121.
- ——————— (1995b). Recovered Roots: Collective Memory and the Making of Israeli National Tradition. University of Chicago Press. ISBN 978-0-226-98157-4.
