= Ayana Holloway Arce =

American physicist

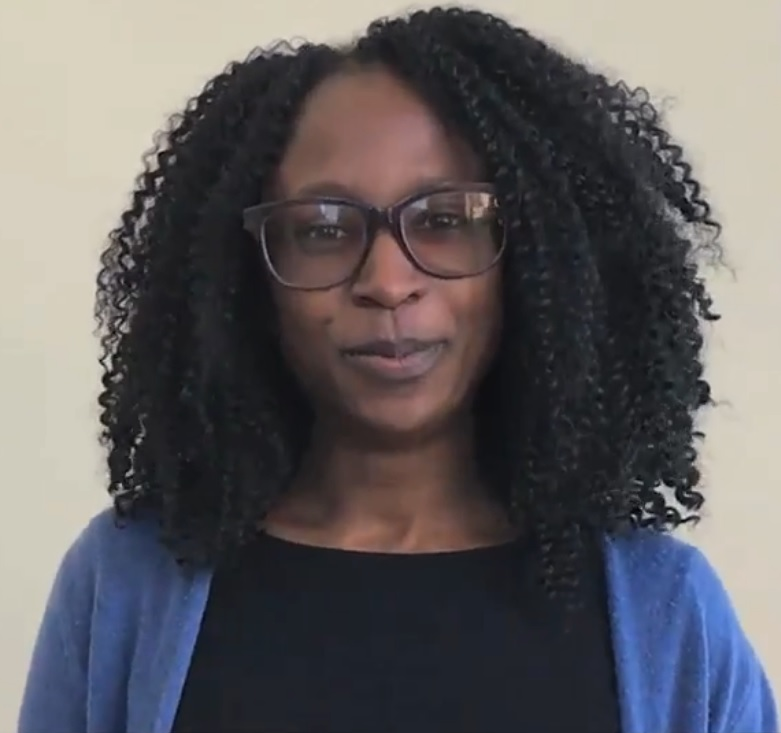
- Arce in 2017
- Education: Harvard University; Princeton University
- Scientific career
- Workplaces: Duke University; Lawrence Berkeley National Laboratory

Ayana Tamu Arce (née Holloway) is an American physicist and professor of physics at Duke University. She works on particle physics, using data from the Large Hadron Collider to understand phenomena beyond the Standard Model.

== Early life and education ==
Arce was born in Lansing, Michigan and studied physics at Princeton University, graduating with honors and a bachelor's degree in 1998.

She moved on to Harvard University for her PhD, working as the Collider Detector at the Fermilab (CDF) detector at the Fermi National Accelerator Laboratory. She completed her PhD in 2006.

== Family ==
Her mother, Karla, is James B. Duke Professor of English and Law at Duke University, with special interest in African American culture. Her father, Russell Holloway, is a computer scientist and Pratt School of Engineering's Associate Dean for Corporate and Industrial Relations.

== Research ==
After her Ph.D., Arce completed a Chamberlain post-doctoral fellowship at Lawrence Berkeley National Laboratory, where she worked on experimental techniques to measure the properties of heavy unstable particles. Arce joined Duke University in 2010 and was made a Woodrow Wilson Foundation Fellow in 2012. Arce is working on the calorimeter detector at the ATLAS experiment. She is working on jet substructure reconstruction, and the use of jet tagging in diboson resonances. Additionally, she worked on the trigger system for the LHC, improving it for the 2022-5 period.

In 2017 Arce and her mother, Karla, were involved in Duke University's commemorations of 50 years of Black faculty scholarship. She was excited by the film Hidden Figures and has taken part in national discussions looking at how to engage more people of colour in scientific careers. She is part of the Triangle Universities Nuclear Laboratory research consortium, which supports undergraduate students to complete summer research projects in nuclear and particle physics.
