= Robert Chester Smith =

American art historian (1912–1975)

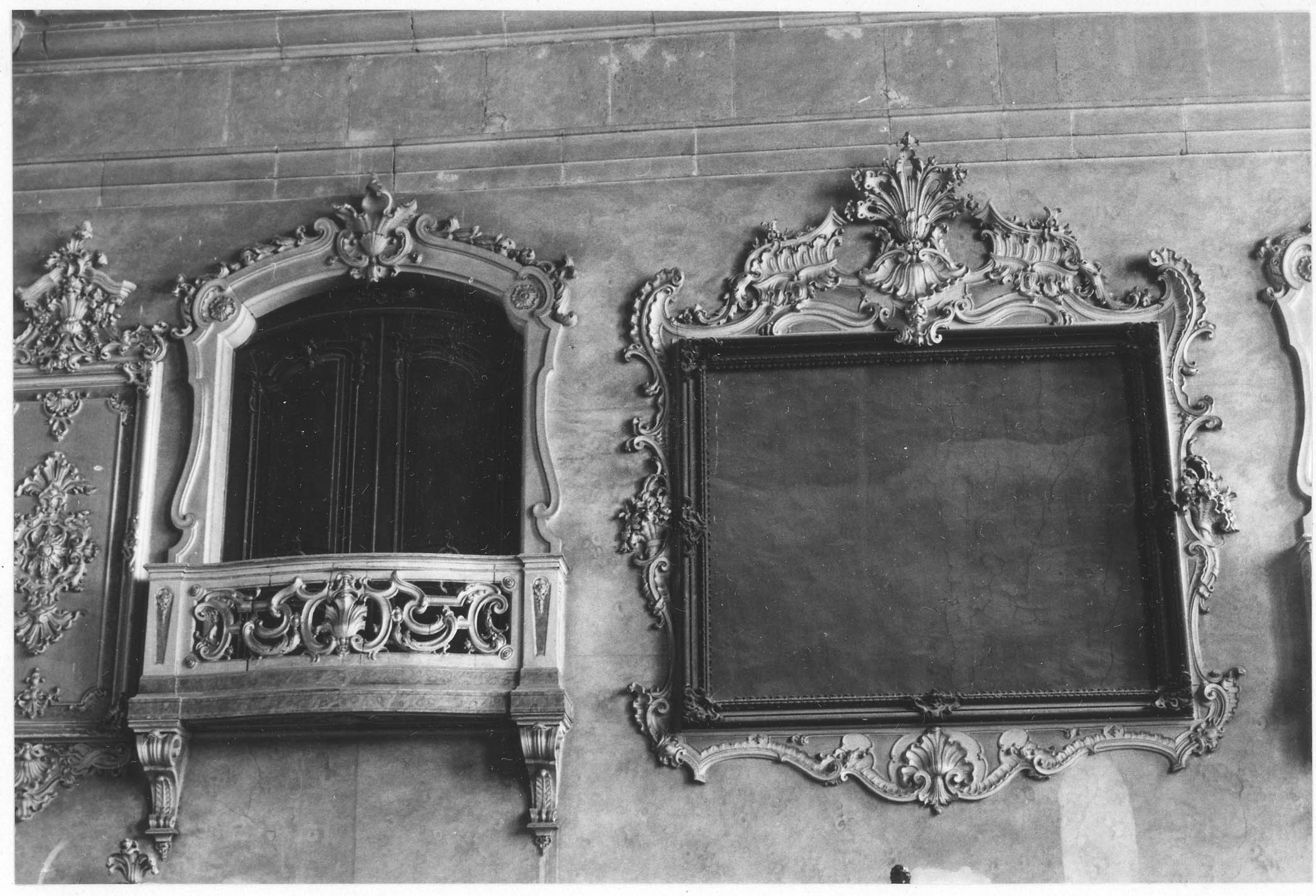
- Photo of the interior of the Igreja de Nossa Senhora de Jesus by Robert Chester Smith, early 1960s.
- Born: February 26, 1912; Cranford, New Jersey, USA
- Died: 1975
- Occupation: Art historian
- Notable work: The Art of Portugal (1968), A Talha em Portugal (1963)
- Awards: Athenaeum Literary Award (1968)

Robert Chester Smith (Cranford, 26 February 1912 – 1975) was an American art historian specialized in Portuguese art and Colonial Brazil art.

== Life and work ==
Robert Smith was born on February 26, 1912, in Cranford, New Jersey.

Smith received his doctorate from Harvard University, where he presented a dissertation on the German architect living in Portugal João Frederico Ludovice in 1939. He joined the University of Pennsylvania in 1947 and taught at the institution's School of Fine Arts from 1956 until his death in 1975.

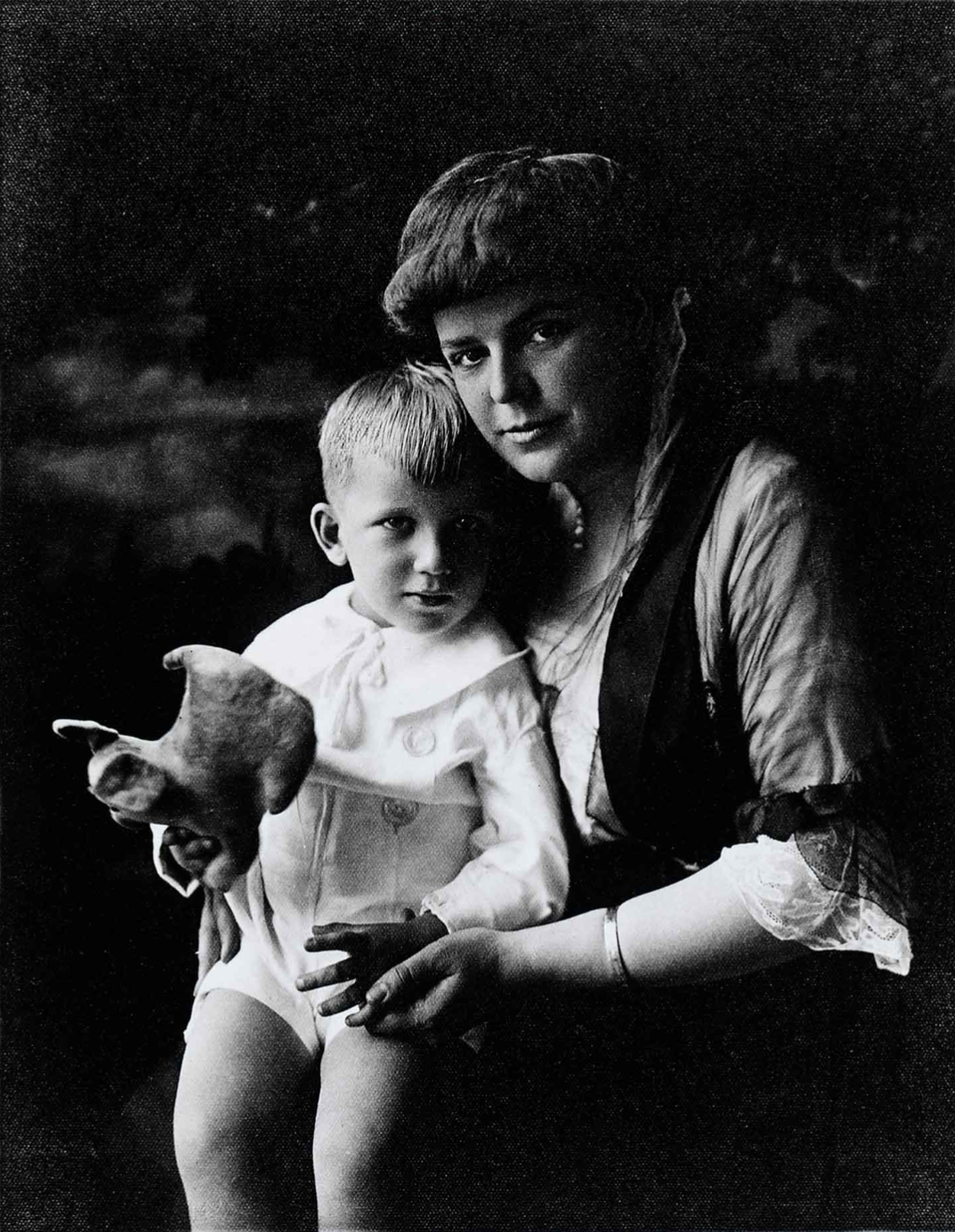
Robert Chester Smith in 1915 at 3 or 4 years of age.

His notable works include "The Art of Portugal" (London, Weidenfeld & Nicolson, 1968), for which he won the Athenaeum Literary Award from the Athenaeum of Philadelphia. In the 1960s he carried out an inventory of Talha Dourada in Portugal with a grant from the Calouste Gulbenkian Foundation. From this work, A Talha em Portugal was published in 1963.

In 1969 he was awarded the title of Professor Honoris Causa by the Federal University of Rio de Janeiro, on the recommendation of the Faculdade de Arquitetura e Urbanismo da Universidade Federal do Rio de Janeiro.

In his will, he bequeathed his collection of documents and photographs to the Calouste Gulbenkian Foundation. The Robert C. Smith Award for researchers in the decorative arts was established in his honour by the Decorative Arts Society of the United States.

Robert Smith died in 1975.

== Articles ==
- Robert C. Smith. João Frederico Ludovice an Eighteenth Century Architect in Portugal. The Art Bulletin. Vol. 18, No. 3 (Sep., 1936), pp. 273–370
- Robert C. Smith. The colonial architecture of Minas Gerais in Brazil. The Art Bulletin. Vol. 21, No. 2 (Jun., 1939), pp. 110–159.
- Robert C. Smith. Jesuit buildings in Brazil. The Art Bulletin. Vol. 30, No. 3 (Sep., 1948), pp. 187–213.
- Robert C. Smith. Arquitetura civil do período colonial. Revista do Patrimônio Histórico e Artístico Nacional, n. 17, p. 27-125, 1969
