= Bettina Linn =

American writer (1905–1962)

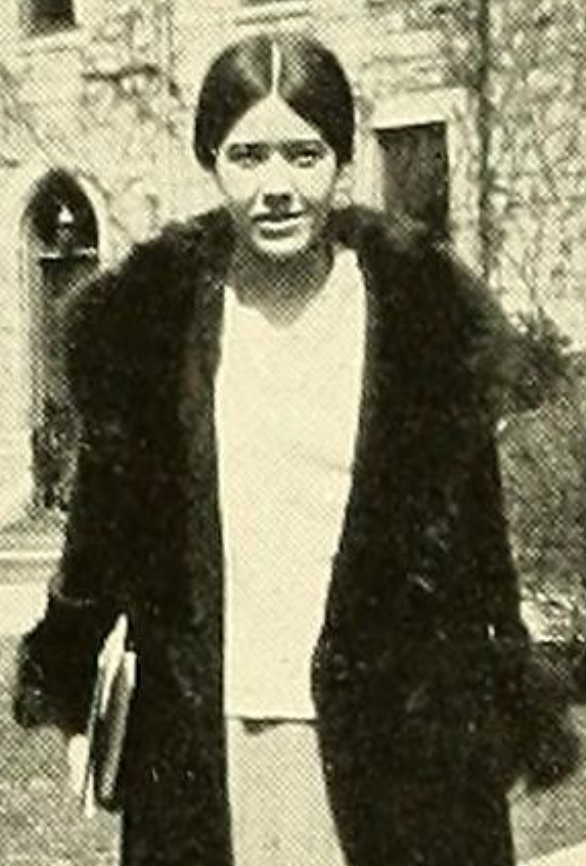
- Bettina Linn, from the 1926 yearbook of Bryn Mawr College
- Born: Mary Bettina Linn; 1905; Philadelphia, Pennsylvania
- Died: April 7, 1962 (aged 56–57); Bryn Mawr, Pennsylvania
- Occupations: Writer, college professor

Mary Bettina Linn (1905 – April 7, 1962) was an American writer and college professor. She wrote three published novels, and was on the faculty at Bryn Mawr College. She worked with the Office of Strategic Services (OSS) during World War II.

== Early life ==
Linn was from Overbrook, Pennsylvania, the daughter of William Bomberger Linn and Josephine Stewart Wood Linn. Her father was a judge on Pennsylvania's State Supreme Court. She graduated from Bryn Mawr College in 1926, and earned a master's degree there in 1929.

== Career ==
Linn was a professor at Bryn Mawr College beginning in 1934, and held the Margaret Kingsland Haskell Chair as a professor of English from 1957 until her death in 1962. In the 1950s, she was active with the Three-College Russia Committee, and invited speakers to campus, including British theorist Isaiah Berlin and Southern writer Eudora Welty. One of her students was Joanna Semel Rose.

During World War II, Linn worked with the Office of Strategic Services in Washington, as a researcher and analyst in the Russia division.

== Publications ==
Linn published two short stories with patriotic themes in St. Nicholas Magazine when she was a teenager. She also wrote articles and at least one book review for the Yale Review. She published two novels in her lifetime. The second, A Letter to Elizabeth (1957), won the Philadelphia Athenaeum Fiction Award in 1958. A British reviewer said, "Miss Linn has created two beautifully three-dimensional characters who nearly steal the limelight." A third novel by Linn was published posthumously in 1965.

- "For Freedom's Sake" (1918, short story)
- "The Price of Liberty" (1918, short story)
- Flea Circus (1936, novel)
- "The Fortunate Generation" (1942, article)
- "The Fiction of the Future" (1945, article)
- A Letter to Elizabeth (1957, novel)
- After the Wedding Anniversary (1965, novel)

== Personal life ==
Linn died in 1962, at the age of 56, in Bryn Mawr.
