= Arthur H. Quinn =

American academic

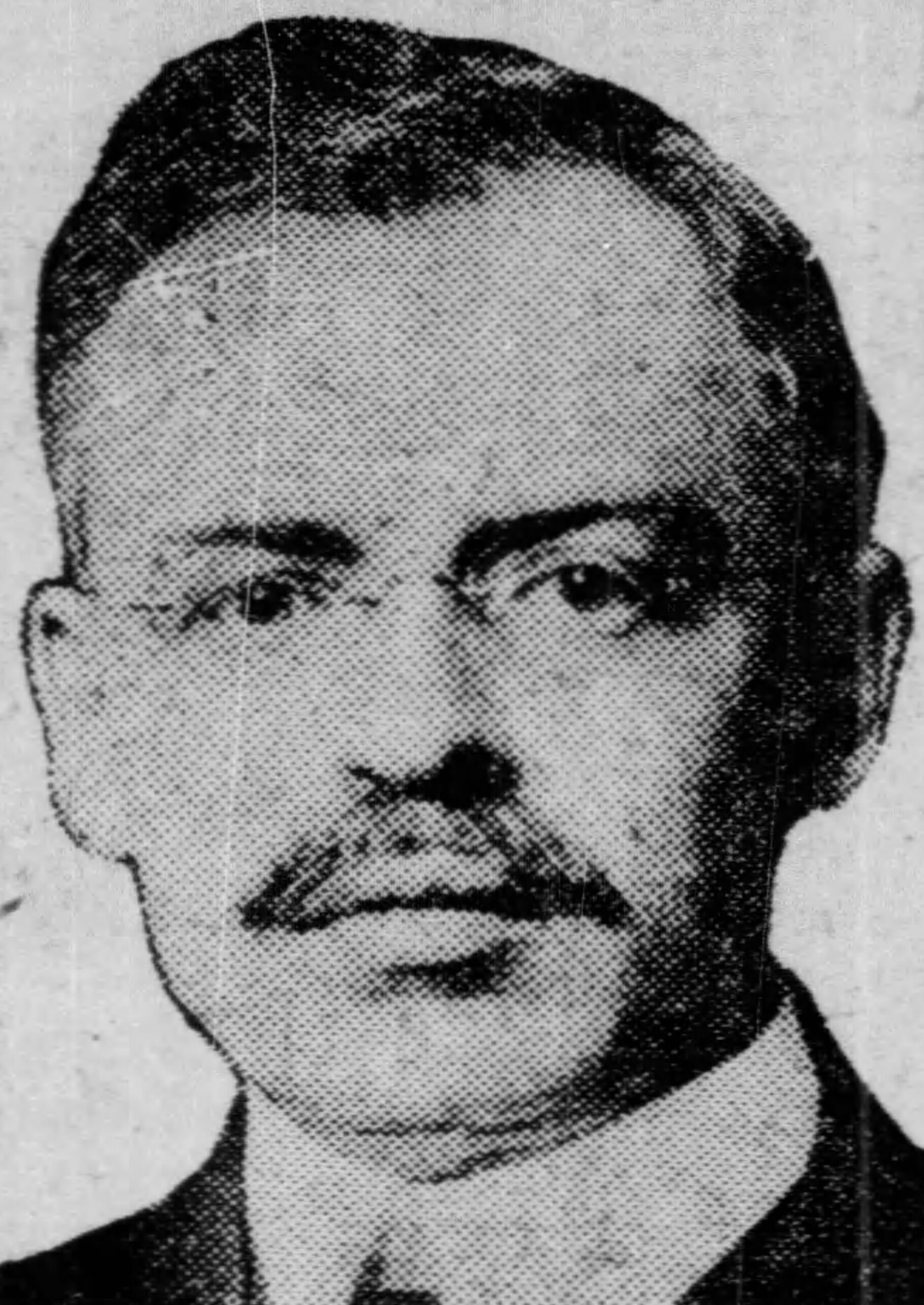
Arthur H. Quinn, c. 1922

Arthur Hobson Quinn (February 9, 1875 – October 16, 1960) was an American academic who specialized in American literature.

Born in Philadelphia, he studied at the University of Pennsylvania and worked there for sixty years until his retirement in 1954. He published several academic works on American literature and theatre.

== Early life and education ==
Arthur Hobson Quinn was born in Philadelphia on February 9, 1875. He had at least one brother.

During the 1890s, Quinn began studying at the University of Pennsylvania (also known as Penn). In January 1893, he was elected to join the editorial board of the Red and Blue school journal. Quinn graduated the following year and was awarded membership of the Phi Beta Kappa honor society. In 1897, Quinn began a year of study at the Ludwig-Maximilians-Universität München in Germany.

He received a doctorate from Penn in 1899.

== Academic career ==
After graduating in 1894, Quinn began teaching at Penn as an instructor in mathematics. The following year he became an instructor in English.

In 1904, he was appointed assistant professor of English at Penn. From 1904 to 1907, he was the founding director of the Penn Summer School. He became a full professor in 1908.

In September 1912, Quinn succeeded George H. Fisher as Dean of the college at Penn. He stayed in the position until 1922.

In 1939, he was appointed Welsh Professor of History and English. He was named professor emeritus in 1945 and retired nine years later in 1954.

== Group memberships ==
Quinn was a member of the Franklin Inn Club, the Lenni-Lenape Club at Penn, the American Philosophical Society and Beta Theta Pi.

== Writing career ==
As early as June 1894, Quinn was writing and performing poetry in front of groups: he recited a poem at his graduation ceremony that month and at a reunion the following February. In 1899, Quinn published a book of short stories called Pennsylvania Stories through the Penn Publishing Company. The work was illustrated by Frederick Foster Lincoln, a student at the University of Pennsylvania.

In 1927, he wrote a two volume work titled History of the American Dramas.

In 1941, Quinn published the work Edgar Allan Poe: A Critical Biography with Appleton-Century Company. In his American Literature review, James Southall Wilson described it as "the best of the lives of Poe". Similar views were offered by Hardin Craig, who wrote that "he has brought into the field of Poe biography excellent talent and sound scholarship and has devoted them to the purification of the record".

In 1951, he edited a collection called The Literature of the American People. He was honored the following year by the Athenaeum of Philadelphia for the work.

== Personal life ==
Quinn was married to Helen McKee. Their son James H. Quinn was principal of Episcopal Academy in Newtown Square, Pennsylvania. Their daughter Kathleen C. Quinn was director of drama at the University of Pennsylvania. Their other children include a son named Arthur H. Quinn Jr. and two more daughters.

In 1960, Quinn lived in Bala Cynwyd, Pennsylvania. He died at Lankenau Hospital in Wynnewood on October 16, 1960.

== Awards and honors ==
- Honorary Doctor of Letters from Saint Joseph's University (1918)
