= David Barnes (cricketer) =

English cricketer

David Barnes (born 27 September 1982) is an English cricketer. He is a right-handed batsman and a right-arm medium-pace bowler who played List A cricket for Cumberland. He was born in Whitehaven and has a twin sister, Jennifer Barnes.

Having made his debut for the team in the Minor Counties Championship at the age of 17, Barnes made a single one-day appearance, in the Cheltenham & Gloucester Trophy, in August 2003.

Barnes played for Durham Academy for a number of years before moving to the South to pursue a change of career.

As of 2008, Barnes still plays in the Minor Counties Championship for Berkshire. He received his Berkshire cap in 2008, having finished on the losing side in the final of the MCCA Trophy competition.
