= Gerald Carson (writer) =

American advertising executive

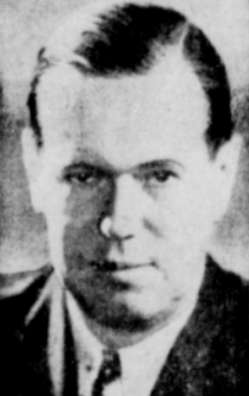
- Born: July 6, 1899; Carrollton, Illinois
- Died: December 4, 1989 (aged 90); Langhorne, Pennsylvania
- Occupations: Social historian, writer

Gerald Hewes Carson (July 6, 1899 – December 4, 1989) was an American advertising executive, social historian and writer.

== Biography ==
Carson was born in Carrollton, Illinois. He obtained his bachelor's and master's degrees from the University of Illinois. He started advertising in 1923. He was vice president at William Esty & Company, at Benton & Bowles and at Kenyon & Eckhardt. He became a full time writer in 1951 and was on the advisory board of the American Heritage magazine during 1964–1976 and in 1989.

Many of Carson's books were positively reviewed for their detailed research. Historian Milton W. Hamilton wrote that Carson's The Old Country Store "is highly entertaining and belongs in the library of all who enjoy Americana and folklore. It is well written and is based on much devoted research."

Carson died in Langhorne, Pennsylvania.

== Animal welfare ==
Carson authored a historical volume on animal welfare, Men, Beasts, and Gods: A History of Cruelty and Kindness to Animals in 1972. It contains information about historical figures from the animal welfare movement such as Henry Bergh and George T. Angell.

Unlike Carson's other works it was negatively reviewed in academic journals. For example, historian Miriam Z. Langsam commented that it is "frequently difficult to distinguish this book from a polemic put out by the ASPCA".

== Selected publications ==
- The Old Country Store (1954)
- Cornflake Crusade (1957)
- The Roguish World of Doctor Brinkley (1960)
- One for a Man, Two for a Horse: A Pictorial History, Grave and Comic, of Patent Medicines (1961)
- The Social History of Bourbon (1963)
- Rum and Reform in Old New England (1966)
- The Polite Americans (1966)
- Men, Beasts, and Gods: A History of Cruelty and Kindness to Animals (1972)
- The Golden Egg (1977)
- Dentist and the Empress: Adventures of Dr. Tom Evans in Gas-lit Paris (1984)
