= Steven Ujifusa =

American author

Steven Brooks Ujifusa is an American historian and the author of three books on maritime history.

Ujifusa's father Grant was a founding editor of The Almanac of American Politics and prominent participant in the Japanese American redress movement of the 1980s. His mother Amy was a graduate of Sarah Lawrence College and the Juilliard School of Music.

Ujifusa majored in history as an undergraduate at Harvard University and earned a master's degree in historic preservation and real estate development from the University of Pennsylvania. His first book, A Man and His Ship, won the Literary Prize for Non-Fiction from the Athenaeum of Philadelphia and was named one of the top ten non-fiction books of 2012 by The Wall Street Journal. In 2019, he received the Washington Irving Literary Medal from the Saint Nicholas Society of the City of New York.

== Books ==
- A Man and His Ship: America's Greatest Naval Architect and His Quest to Build the SS United States. New York: Simon & Schuster. 2012. ISBN 978-1-4516-4507-1.
- Barons of the Sea: And Their Race to Build the World's Fastest Clipper Ship. New York: Simon & Schuster. 2018. ISBN 978-1-4767-4597-8.
- The Last Ships from Hamburg: Business, Rivalry, and the Race to Save Russia's Jews on the Eve of World War I. New York: HarperCollins. 2023. ISBN 978-0-06-297189-0.
