= David P. Silverman =

American historian

- Education: University of Chicago
- Occupations: Eckley Brinton Coxe, Jr. Professor of Egyptology at the University of Pennsylvania

David P. Silverman is an American archaeologist and Egyptologist.

== Education ==
He received an undergraduate degree from Rutgers University where he majored in art history. He later studied Egyptology as a graduate student at the University of Chicago where he received his PhD. Shortly after, he took a position at the international Treasures of Tutankhamun exhibit which originally ran from 1977 to 1982, and continued to work as curator on subsequent exhibits. Following this, he continued working at a variety of institutions including the Field Museum in Chicago.

== Career ==
Since 1996, he has been Eckley Brinton Coxe, Jr. Professor of Egyptology at the University of Pennsylvania and head curator of the University of Pennsylvania Museum of Archaeology and Anthropology's Egyptian section. Alongside this, he currently teaches an online course through Coursera called Introduction to Ancient Egypt and Its Civilization. Some of his archaeological work has included excavations at Bersheh and Saqqara.

== Major publications ==
- 50 Wonders of Tutankhamun (New York, NY: Crown Publishing Group, 1978)
- Masterpieces of Tutankhamun (New York, NY: Abbeville Press, 1978)
- Interrogative Constructions With Jn And Jn Jw In Old And Middle Egyptian (Malibu, CA: Undena Publications, 1980)
- The Tomb Chamber of Ḫsw the Elder: The Inscribed Material at Kom El-Hisn, Part 1: Illustrations (Egypt: American Research Center in Egypt, 1988)
- Language and Writing in Ancient Egypt (Philadelphia, PA: University of Pennsylvania Press, 1990)
- Religion in Ancient Egypt: Gods, Myths, and Personal Practice (New York, NY: Cornell University Press, 1991)
- For His Ka: Essays Offered In Memory Of Klaus Baer (Chicago, IL: Oriental Institute Press, 1994)
- Searching For Ancient Egypt (Dallas Museum of Art/University of Pennsylvania Museum of Archaeology and Anthropology/Cornell University, 1997)
- Ancient Egypt (Oxford, Oxford University Press, 1997)
- Akhenaten and Tutankhamun: Revolution and Restoration (Philadelphia, PA: University of Pennsylvania Museum of Archaeology and Anthropology, 2006)
- Archaism and Innovation: Studies in the Culture of Middle Kingdom Egypt (Philadelphia, PA: University of Pennsylvania Museum of Archaeology and Anthropology, 2009)
