= Judith E. Stein =

American art historian (born 1943)

- Born: 1943 (age 82–83)
- Education: B.A., Art History, Barnard College, 1965; M.A., Art History, University of Pennsylvania, 1967; Ph.D., Art History, University of Pennsylvania, 1981

Judith E. Stein (born 1943) is a Philadelphia-based art historian and curator, whose academic career has focused on the postwar New York art world. She has written a biography of the art dealer Richard Bellamy, as well as feature articles regarding artists including Jo Baer, Red Grooms, Lester Johnson, Alfred Leslie and Jay Milder.

== Career ==
Stein earned a B.A. in Art History from Barnard College, New York City in 1965, and an M.A. and Ph.D. in Art History from the University of Pennsylvania, Philadelphia in 1967 and 1981, respectively. She studied at the Courtauld Institute of Art in London from 1967 to 1968.

Between 1983 and 1995, Stein served as Contemporary Curator for the Pennsylvania Academy of Fine Art, where she organized traveling mid-career surveys for Red Grooms and Horace Pippin, a site-specific installation by Bettye Saar; as well as exhibitions for Tom Butter, Louise Fishman, Mike Glier, Lois Lane, Ray Metzker, Pepon Osorio, Judy Pfaff, Jody Pinto, Raymond Saunders, Joyce Scott, Judith Shea and Toshiko Takaezu. In 1994, she received a Pew Foundation Fellowship in the Arts in literary non-fiction for her art writing and was a scholar in residence at the Rockefeller Foundation Bellagio Center. In 2008, the Warhol Foundation/Creative Capital awarded Stein an Arts Writers Book Grant. The International Art Critics Association awarded her book I Tell My Heart: The Art of Horace Pippin Best Exhibition Catalog for 1995.

Stein has curated exhibitions for the New Museum of Contemporary Art, New York City, NY; Slought Foundation, Philadelphia, PA; Brattleboro Museum, Brattleboro, VT and DC Moore Gallery, New York, NY. As the Consulting Curator for the Pennsylvania Convention Center since 1995, she has supervised commissioned works by Jones and Ginzel, Mei-ling Hom, Judy Pfaff, John Scott, among others.

== Work ==
With Paul Schimmel, Stein co-curated Figurative Fifties: New York Figurative Expressionism (1988) for the Pennsylvania Academy of Fine Arts, Philadelphia, PA, which traveled to Newport Harbor Art Museum, Newport Beach, CA and the McNay Museum, San Antonio, TX. The accompanying monograph featured her essay Figuring Out the Fifties: Aspects of Figuration and Abstraction in New York 1950-1962.

Her exhibition Jules Olitski, An Inside View: A Survey of Prints, 1954-2007 (2008), which Stein curated for the Brattleboro Museum of Art, Brattleboro, VT, traveled to the Weatherspoon Art Museum, Greensboro, NC; Luther W. Brady Art Gallery, Washington, D.C.; Butler Institute of American Art, Youngtown, OH; and Everson Art Museum, Syracuse, NY. I Tell My Heart: The Art of Horace Pippin (1993), which she curated for the Pennsylvania Academy of Fine Arts, traveled to the Baltimore Museum of Art, Baltimore, MD; Chicago Art Institute, Chicago, IL; Cincinnati Art Museum, Cincinnati, OH; and The Metropolitan Museum of Art, New York City, NY. "Red Grooms: A Retrospective 1956-1984" (1985), which she curated for PAFA, traveled to Denver Art Museum, Denver, CO; Museum of Contemporary Art, Los Angeles, CA; Tennessee State Museum, Nashville, TN and the Whitney Museum of American Art, New York City, NY.

Stein has contributed essays to Grandma Moses in the Twenty-First Century (2001), Self-Taught Artists of the 20th Century (1998), The Power of Feminist Art (1995), Encyclopedia of African American Culture and History (1993) and Making Their Mark: Women Artists Move into the Mainstream 1970-1985 (1989).

Stein's articles have appeared in Art in America, The Sienese Shredder, Daidalos, Art News, Drawing, Fiberarts, as well as exhibition catalogs for Saint Louis Art Museum, Philadelphia's Institute of Contemporary Art, Locks Gallery and Arcadia University Art Gallery; New York City's Francis M. Naumann Fine Arts, DC Moore Gallery, Steinbaum Krauss Gallery, June Kelly Gallery and Gallery Moos; New England Center for Contemporary Art; Pittsburgh Center for the Arts and Knoxville Museum of Art.

She has taught at the Maryland Institute College of Art, Baltimore, MD; the University of Pennsylvania, Philadelphia, PA; and Tyler School of Art, Temple University, Philadelphia, PA.

From 1979 to 1983, she reported on contemporary art exhibitions for WHYY-FM’s Fresh Air as well as NPR’s Morning Edition.

== Books ==
Stein contributed essays to exhibition monographs that she edited, including

- Jules Olitski, An Inside View: A Survey of Prints, 1954-2007,
- Picturing the Modern Amazon: The Hypermuscular Woman,
- Jacob Landau: Old Man Mad About Drawing,
- I Tell My Heart: The Art of Horace Pippin,
- Figurative Fifties: New York Figurative Expressionism
- Red Grooms: A Retrospective 1956-1984.
- Eye of the Sixties : Richard Bellamy and the transformation of modern art. New York : Farrar, Straus and Giroux, 2016.
