= Robert McCracken Peck =

- Born: Robert McCracken Peck about 1952; Philadelphia, Pennsylvania, U.S.
- Education: Princeton University (AB); University of Delaware (MA)
- Occupation: Curator at the Academy of Natural Sciences of Drexel University

Robert McCracken Peck is an American naturalist, historian, writer, and photographer. He was a senior fellow and the artifacts curator at the Academy of Natural Sciences of Drexel University.

== Books ==
- Travels on the Edge A Naturalist’s Notes from the Back of Beyond (2026)
- Specimens of Hair: The Curious Collection of Peter A. Browne (2018)
- The Natural History of Edward Lear (2016)
- with Patricia Tyson Stroud A Glorious Enterprise: The Academy of Natural Sciences of Philadelphia and the Making of American Science (2012)
- Land of the Eagle (1990)
- Headhunters and Hummingbirds (1987)
