= Barry Schwartz (sociologist) =

American sociologist (1938–2021)

Barry Schwartz (January 19, 1938 – January 6, 2021) was an American sociologist.

== Career ==
Born in Philadelphia, Pennsylvania, Schwartz received his B.S., M.A., and Ph.D. from Temple University (1962), University of Maryland (1964), and University of Pennsylvania (1970), respectively. He has taught at the University of Chicago and University of Georgia and been a fellow at the University of Georgia Institute for Behavioral Research (1977–1983), the Center for Advanced Study in the Behavioral and Social Sciences (1987–1988) in Stanford, CA, the National Humanities Center (1992–1993) in Research Triangle, NC, the Smithsonian Museum of National History in Washington, DC (1993), and the University of Georgia Humanities Center (1994). He has also been a Davis Fellow, Faculty of Social Sciences, Hebrew University (2002) in Jerusalem. In 2000, he received the William A. Owens Award for Outstanding Research and Creativity (University of Georgia); in 2009 he was awarded an Honorary Doctorate by Hebrew University.

== Academic focus ==
Since the early 1980s, Schwartz has dedicated almost all his research to the problem of collective memory. His work affirms the perspectives of both realism and constructionism. However, Schwartz's realism is self-evident, for it denies any assertion that individual and collective memories are “constructed,” i.e., selectively reported, muted, or otherwise distorted, unless one possesses a plausible estimate of the past “as it essentially (not ‘actually’) was.” On the other hand, estimates of the past become even more plausible when the sources of their exaggerations, omissions, and other distortions are identified. For Schwartz, therefore, realism’s premise is modest: the meaning of events vary ceaselessly, and often significantly, but in the average situation that meaning is more often forced upon the observer by an event’s properties than imposed by observer’s categories of thought, sensitivity, worldview, or interests. Because the properties of past events are always inferred from incomplete information, reality cannot uniquely determine perception, but this does not mean that observers’ perceptual frames count more than reality in the remembering of most events most of the time. If the case were otherwise, memory and history would have no survival value. Accordingly, the following issues are encompassed within Schwartz's academic focus: the extent of collective memory's variation between and within generations; memory as an antidote to distorted history; reality as a limit to constructed memories; memory as a source of unity and conflict; the continuity of memory in the face of social change, and the enduring need of individuals to find orientation and meaning for their lives by invoking, embracing, rejecting, revising, and judging the past.

== Special areas ==
=== Collective Memory ===
Schwartz's effort to reconcile realism and constructionism is most evident in his collective memory studies, which include books and articles that trace Abraham Lincoln's scholarly and popular images from his death in 1865 to present and George Washington's emergence and transformation as a national idol. His work on the distinctiveness of “The American Heroic Vision” includes beliefs and moral sentiments about Dwight Eisenhower and Richard Nixon. Schwartz's comparative work includes the fate of Confucius before and after the Cultural Revolution and studies of Korean and Japanese memory with special emphasis on the “history problem” in Northeast Asia. Memory as a source of honor and disgrace is addressed not only in Asian studies but also comparisons of Americans and Germans and of Jewish and Arab Israelis. His later work included an extension of his research on the Gettysburg Address into a book-length treatment of its original and drastically changing meanings. Schwartz's research on the historical Jesus, on which no contemporaneous written documentation exists, shows how the words and actions of this apocalyptic prophet can be assessed through the emergent memory of his followers and authenticated by sources external to the Gospels. Schwartz has recently brought the Jesus narratives to bear on Georg Simmel's philosophy of history and its implications for the understanding of collective memory.

=== Sociology of knowledge ===
Collective memory scholarship is a branch of the broader field of the sociology of knowledge. Schwartz's contribution to the latter arises from the French tradition, notably, Emile Durkheim and Marcel Mauss’s Primitive Classification, and it expands Robert Hertz’s discoveries on the preeminence of the right hand and lateral symbolism, Claude Lévi-Strauss on binary classification, and Rodney Needham’s writings on symbolic classification systems. In his analysis of acquisition dates and content of the U.S. Capitol Building’s paintings, statues, busts, and friezes, for example, Schwartz finds art manifesting a binary structure of historically “hot” and “cold” periods. Elsewhere, he dissects the universal tendency to map social inequality into vertical oppositions, and he explains why vertical metaphors, without which inequalities could not be conceived, are a priori categories based on certain universals of social experience.

=== Social psychology ===
Barry Schwartz's sociology of knowledge is informed by Emile Durkheim's cognitive sociology, but his earliest research reflects a different body of influence: interactional social psychology, as conceived especially by Georg Simmel, Erving Goffman, and George Homans. His interest in Simmel shows up in a decade of work on gift exchange, privacy, vengeance and forgiveness, mental life of suburbia, queuing phenomena, priority and social process, waiting and social power. His research inside a juvenile penal institution qualifies Goffman's observations on “total institutions” by demonstrating that behavior within the setting reflects characteristics that youngsters bring into it at least as much as the structure of the setting itself. Analysis of the dynamics of the home advantage in four different sports applies George Homans’ account of reinforcement to explain another aspect of interaction, namely, how spectator behavior affects player performance.

== Summary ==
The path of Barry Schwartz's work runs from interactional social psychology to cognitive sociology, the sociology of knowledge, and collective memory. The last, major phase cannot be inferred from the first but is inextricably connected to it.

== Selected bibliography ==
- Queuing and Waiting: Studies in the Social Organization of Access and Delay. Chicago: University of Chicago Press, 1975.
- The Changing Face of the Suburbs. Chicago: University of Chicago Press, 1976. (Editor. See final chapter: "Images of Suburbia: Some Revisionist Commentary and Conclusions.")
- Vertical Classification: A Study in Structuralism and the Sociology of Knowledge. Chicago: University of Chicago Press. 1981
- George Washington, The Making of an American Symbol. New York: Free Press, 1987. Richard E. Neustadt Award, 1988; Finalist, American Sociological Association Distinguished Scholarly Publication Award, 1990. Paperback edition: Cornell University Press, 1990.
- Abraham Lincoln and the Forge of National Memory. Chicago: University of Chicago Press, 2000. Lincoln Group of New York Award, February, 2001; Lincoln/Barondess Award, New York Civil War Roundtable, February, 2001.
- Abraham Lincoln in the Post-Heroic Era: History and Memory in the Late Twentieth Century (Chicago, IL: University of Chicago Press, 2008).
- “Collective Forgetting and the Symbolic Power of Oneness: The Strange Apotheosis of Rosa Parks,” Social Psychology Quarterly 72 (June 2009): 123–142.
- The Memory Problem: Northeast Asia’s Difficult Past. Co-editor: Mikyoung Kim. (U.K.Palgrave-Macmillan, 2010).
