= David Bradley (novelist) =

American author

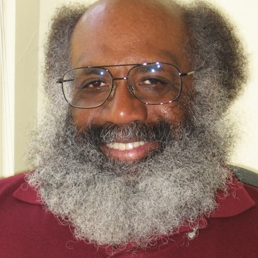
- Born: David Henry Bradley, Jr. 1950 (age 75–76); Bedford, Pennsylvania, USA
- Occupations: novelist, essayist, academic
- Writing career
- Genre: African American literature
- Notable work: The Chaneysville Incident
- Notable awards: PEN/Faulkner Award; 1982 Academy Award of the American Academy of Arts and Letters; 1982 O. Henry Award; 2014

David Henry Bradley, Jr. (born 1950, in Bedford, Pennsylvania) is the author of South Street and The Chaneysville Incident, which won the PEN/Faulkner Award in 1982. Both novels have been recently released in electronic editions by Open Road Media.

== Biography ==
Bradley's The Chaneysville Incident was inspired in part by the real-life discovery of the graves of a group of runaway slaves on a farm near Chaneysville in Bedford County, Pennsylvania, where Bradley was born. This book also earned Bradley a 1982 Academy Award from the American Academy and Institute of Arts and Letters. His short story, "You Remember the Pinmill" (winner of a 2014 O. Henry Award), was published in 2013 in Narrative Magazine.

Since 1985, Bradley has worked primarily in creative nonfiction, with pieces in Esquire, Redbook, The New York Times, Philadelphia Magazine, The Pennsylvania Gazette, The Nation and Dissent. His work has also appeared online in Obit, Narrative, and Brevity.

Bradley holds a bachelor of arts degree in creative writing from the University of Pennsylvania and a master of arts in United States Studies from the University of London. He was also a faculty member in the Creative Writing Program at the University of Oregon.

He appeared on the June 12, 2011 episode of 60 Minutes in a segment regarding the censored version of Adventures of Huckleberry Finn.

== Selected works ==
Fiction

- South Street (1975)
- The Chaneysville Incident (1981)
- "You Remember the Pin Mill" (2012) Narrative Magazine Winner of a 2014 O. Henry Award.

Essays and creative non-fiction

- “The Faith”. In Praise of What Persists. Ed. Stephen Berg. New York: Harper, 1983. 9–18.
- “Christmas Eve”. While Someone Else is Eating. Ed. Earl Shorris. New York: Doubleday, 1984. 175–98.
- "On Re-Reading Native Son" (1986), New York Times Magazine
- “Black and American”. Essays for ‘80s. Ed. William Vesterman. New York: Random House, 1987. 397–402.
- “Bringing Down the Fire”. Spiritual Quests: The Art and Craft of Religious Writing. Ed. William Zinser. Boston: Houghton Mifflin, 1988.
- “Harvest Home”. Family Portraits. Ed. Carolyn Anthony. Garden City, NY: Doubleday, 1989. 49–66.
- “Jim and the Dead Man”. The New Yorker. 26 June-3 July 1995: 126–33.
- "Layers of Paradox" Dissent
- “Psalms and Gospels”. Communion. Ed. David Rosenberg. New York: Doubleday, 1996.
- "Black Scholars, White Scholars: Awkward Moments" (1997), Chronicle of Higher Education.
- “To Make Them Stand in Fear”. When Race Becomes Real: Black and White Writers Confront Their Personal Histories. Ed. Bernestine Singley. Chicago: Lawrence Hill, 2002. 111–37.
- "...By Any Other Name" Obit; Best Creative Nonfiction Vol. 2 (2008)
- "That Ain't Jazz" (2009) Narrative Magazine
- "Beyond Chagrin" (2009) Brevity: 29
- "The Ever-Evolving Malcolm X" (2009) Obit
- "Misreading Obama" (2010) Dissent
- "Eulogy for Nigger" (2014) "TriQuarterly"
