= David S. Barnes =

American historian

David S. Barnes is an associate professor of history and sociology of science and director of the Health and Societies Program at the University of Pennsylvania. He is a historian specializing in public health issues of Third Republic France. He argues that the development of public health in nineteenth-century France is best understood in terms of the integration of scientific hypotheses into the generally accepted cultural, social and economic frameworks.

== Works ==
=== Books (with selected reviews) ===
- Barnes, David S., The Making of a Social Disease: Tuberculosis in Nineteenth-Century France; University of California Press, 1995. ISBN 978-0-520-08772-9 in 606 WorldCat libraries
  - Review: by Ann F La Berge The American historical review. 101, no. 3, (1996): 854
  - Review: by Robert A. Nye Bulletin of the History of Medicine - Volume 70, Number 3, Fall 1996, pp. 528–529
  - Review: by Anne HardyMedical history. 40, no. 2, (1996): 255
  - Review: by Allan Mitchell: Isis. 86, no. 3, (1995): 507
  - Review by Olivier Faure The Journal of Modern History. 69, no. 1, (1997): 158
  - Review: by Patricia E Prestwick Journal of Social History. 29, no. 4, (1996): 974
- Barnes, David S., The Great Stink of Paris and the Nineteenth-Century Struggle against Filth and Germs; The Johns Hopkins University Press; Oxford University Press, 2006 ISBN 978-0-8018-8349-1 held in 339 WorldCat libraries
  - Review by B. Gastel - 9 Nov, 2006 New England Journal of Medicine 355 (19): 2051 november 9, 2006.
  - Review: by Ann F La Berge JAMA : the journal of the American Medical Association 297, no. 19, (2007): 2144
  - Review: by H Pennington Science (magazine) 313, no. 5794, (September 22, 2006): 1740
  - Review: by Margaret K. Hostetter .Journal of Clinical Investigation. 116(11): 2835-2835 (2006).
  - Review by Elizabeth A Williams Journal of the History of Medicine and Allied Sciences, 63, no. 1 (2008): 117-119
  - Review: by R Lethbridge Journal of European Studies. 2007; 37: 200-202 (subscription required)
  - Review: by O Amsterdamska Isis (journal) 98, no. 3, (2007): 638
  - Review: by Hope Christiansen The French review. 81, no. 4, (2008): 801
  - Review by S Sauget. Revue d'histoire moderne et contemporaine, 55, no. 1, (2008): 215-216

=== Articles ===
- "Wald, Contagious: Cultures, Carriers, and the Outbreak Narrative". The Journal of American History. 96, no. 2: 589-.
- Contagion: Disease, Government, and the Social Question in Nineteenth-Century France (Review)". Journal of the History of Medicine and Allied Sciences. 55, no. 3: 316-318.
- Barnes, David S (2002). "Scents and Sensibilities: Disgust and the Meanings of Odors in Late Nineteenth-Century Paris". Historical Reflections. Réflexions Historiques. 28 (1): 21–49. PMID 15773053.
