= The Chaneysville Incident =

1981 novel by David Bradley

- First edition
- Author: David Bradley
- Language: English
- Publisher: Harper & Row
- Publication date: 1981
- Publication place: USA
- ISBN: 0-06-010491-0
- OCLC: 7177101
- Dewey Decimal: 813/.54 19
- LC Class: PS3552.R226 C5 1981

The Chaneysville Incident is a 1981 novel by David Bradley. The novel won the 1982 PEN/Faulkner Award for Fiction. It concerns a black historian who investigates an incident involving the death of his father and a prior incident involving the death of some 12 slaves. John, the historian, struggles to solve the mystery of his father, Moses Washington, a moonshiner with a troubled past. Imagination, hunting, death, and racial tensions all make thematic appearances in the novel. Chaneysville is in Bedford County, Pennsylvania.
